= November 2024 Indonesian local elections =

2024 Indonesian local elections
- 27 November 2024

37 governors, 415 regents, and 93 mayors
- Lead parties candidate of results by city/regency
Leadership before election
See #Races
Elected Leadership
See #Races

Local executive elections (Indonesian: Pemilihan Kepala Daerah or Pilkada) to elect governors, mayors, and regents in Indonesia were held on 27 November 2024 across 545 regions: 37 provinces, 415 regencies, and 93 cities, which covered all provinces except the Yogyakarta Special Region and all cities/regencies except the constituents of Jakarta. The previous local executive elections were held in 2020. The elections were the first time regional leaders were all elected simultaneously nationwide in Indonesia.

The elections saw major gains for President Prabowo Subianto's Gerindra party, while the Indonesian Democratic Party of Struggle suffered losses in key races, especially in Central and East Java. Golkar and PKS also suffered setbacks. Most elected leaders were sworn in on 20 February 2025, but 26 races had to be repeated in 2025.

== Background ==
Indonesia began electing regional leaders through direct elections in 2005, and between 2015 and 2020, all regional elections held in the year were held at the same date. In 2016, a law was passed that made all regional elections starting in 2024 to be held on the same date. As a consequence, regional leaders elected in 2017 and 2018 would be replaced by appointed officials after the end of their term until the 2024 elections are held. On the other hand, regional leaders elected in 2020 would only serve for less than a full five-year term, ranging from three to four years. On 24 January 2022, the House of Representatives agreed to set the date of the 2024 local elections at 27 November 2024.

The elections are regulated by Law No. 10 of 2016 on local elections.

== Timeline ==
Timeline of the 2024 local elections
8 – 12 May	Independent candidate verification
27 – 29 August (Note: Subject to a three-day extension should only one candidate register, and there are political parties eligible to nominate another candidate. This corresponded to 48 elections, including one gubernatorial election, five mayoral elections, and 42 regency elections. The regions received an extension to 4 September.)	Candidate registration
22 September	Official candidate confirmation
25 September – 23 November	Campaigning period
27 November	Election date
27 November – 16 December	Vote counting

== Candidates ==
All candidates are required to be, at a minimum, graduates of senior high school or equivalent. Any approved candidates are required to resign from certain government positions, including legislative offices, Armed Forces/Police positions, civil servants, and employees of state-owned companies. The minimum age is 30 for gubernatorial candidates and 25 for mayor/regent candidates. Furthermore, a two-term limit applies, including for different regions, and former governors/regents/mayors are not allowed to run for vice-leader of their previous position. On 30 May 2024, the Supreme Court of Indonesia ruled that the age limit applied to the age of the candidates on the date of swearing, in should they win the election (which are expected to take place in 2025), instead of the registration date of the election. In particular, this change allowed Kaesang Pangarep, son of the 7th Indonesian President Joko Widodo, to contest gubernatorial elections. A ruling by the Constitutional Court of Indonesia reverted the criteria, setting the age benchmark to be the date of the official confirmation of candidates.

The General Elections Commission (KPU) initially noted that legislators newly elected in the 2024 Indonesian legislative election did not need to resign; however, this was later rescinded and elected legislators will also be required to resign. Candidates can either run as an independent or a party-backed candidate. To run with party backing, the candidate is required to secure the formal support of a party or a coalition of parties that collectively hold at least 20 percent of seats in the relevant Regional House of Representatives (DPRD) or between 6.5 and 10 percent (Note: Prior to a Constitutional Court ruling in August 2024, the popular vote requirement was set to 25 percent. Furthermore, the decision also overturned a previous rule where only political parties with representation within DPRD are allowed to nominate candidates – hence allowing parties which participated in the legislative election while not winning any seats to nominate a candidate.) of votes in the 2024 legislative election in the area, depending on the population.

Independent candidates are required to submit photocopies of identity cards as proof of support, numbering between 6.5 and 10 percent of the registered electorate in a given region. According to KPU, 168 independent candidates nationwide registered, down from 203 who registered for the 2020 elections. For all gubernatorial elections, eleven pairs of independent candidates registered, of which two pairs are confirmed to have submitted sufficient proof. One of the two resigned, leaving just one pair of independent candidates running for governor (Dharma Pongrekun in Jakarta).

In total, KPU approved 1,553 pairs of candidates, including 103 gubernatorial tickets, 284 mayoral tickets, and 1,166 regency tickets. After they had been approved, but prior to the election date, at least five candidates had died, including North Maluku gubernatorial candidate Benny Laos, who died in a speedboat explosion. The other deaths include three vice-gubernatorial candidates (in Aceh, South Papua, and Central Papua) and a vice-regent candidate (in Ciamis, West Java). A further four tickets were disqualified: one gubernatorial ticket (Southwest Papua), two mayoral tickets (Metro and Banjarbaru), and one regency (Fakfak).

== Electoral system ==
2024 Indonesian local election logo

All local elections in 2024, except for the Jakarta gubernatorial election, follow the first-past-the-post system, where the candidate with the most votes wins the election, even if they do not win a majority. The gubernatorial election for Jakarta requires a runoff if no candidates achieve a simple majority. It is possible for a candidate to run uncontested, in which case the candidate is still required to win a majority of votes "against" an "empty box" option. Should the candidate fail to do so, the election will be repeated on a later date. There were 37 single-candidate races against "empty box" options in 2024, and in the Banjarbaru mayoral election, a single-candidate race, as the disqualified alternate candidate's votes were considered invalid.

To facilitate voter turnout, the date of the election (27 November 2024) was set as a national holiday, with workers receiving overtime pay should they continue to work.

== Controversies ==
The Central government's appointment of officials as acting executives due to the election synchronization has been criticized for the lack of transparency, with almost half of Indonesia's regions being governed by the appointees at the time of the election. KPU's decision to set just five days (8 to 12 May) to allow registration of independent candidates was also criticized for being too short, with a prospective gubernatorial candidate in Jakarta filing a suit with the General Election Supervisory Agency (Bawaslu) over the decision.

The ruling by the Supreme Court regarding the eligibility of candidates by age was also criticized for benefiting Kaesang and was compared to a similar decision by the Constitutional Court of Indonesia in the lead-up to the 2024 Indonesian presidential election, which enabled Gibran Rakabuming Raka, Kaesang's older brother, to run as Vice President of Indonesia.

== Races ==
=== Gubernatorial ===
Gubernatorial elections are held in all of Indonesia's provinces, except for the Special Region of Yogyakarta where the Sultan of Yogyakarta and the Duke of Pakualam are automatically the governor and vice-governor, respectively.

Province	Previous governor (Note: Prior to replacement with appointed acting governors/mayors/regents, including elected deputies which replaced leaders who died in office, resigned, or arrested. Party affiliation are given as of election date.)	Elected governor	Notes
Aceh (details)	Nova Iriansyah (Demokrat)	Muzakir Manaf (PA)	
North Sumatra (details)	Edy Rahmayadi (PDI-P)	Bobby Nasution (Gerindra)	
West Sumatra (details)	Mahyeldi Ansharullah (PKS)	Mahyeldi Ansharullah (PKS)	
Riau (details)	Edy Nasution (Nasdem)	Abdul Wahid (PKB)	
Jambi (details)	Al Haris (PAN)	Al Haris (PAN)	
South Sumatra (details)	Herman Deru (Nasdem)	Herman Deru (Nasdem)	
Bengkulu (details)	Rohidin Mersyah (Golkar)	Helmi Hasan (PAN)	
Lampung (details)	Arinal Djunaidi (Golkar)	Rahmat Mirzani Djausal (Gerindra)	
Bangka Belitung Islands (details)	Erzaldi Rosman Djohan (Demokrat)	Hidayat Arsani (Golkar)	
Riau Islands (details)	Ansar Ahmad (Golkar)	Ansar Ahmad (Golkar)	
Banten (details)	Wahidin Halim (Nasdem)	Andra Soni (Gerindra)	
Jakarta (details)	Anies Baswedan	Pramono Anung (PDI-P)	
West Java (details)	Ridwan Kamil (Golkar)	Dedi Mulyadi (Gerindra)	
Central Java (details)	Ganjar Pranowo (PDI-P) (Note: Not allowed to run due to term limits.)	Ahmad Luthfi (Gerindra)	
East Java (details)	Khofifah Indar Parawansa (PKB)	Khofifah Indar Parawansa (PKB)	(Note: Khofifah claims to still be a member of PKB as of the election. However, the party did not endorse her candidacy and backed another ticket.)
West Kalimantan (details)	Sutarmidji (PPP)	Ria Norsan (Gerindra)	(Note: Ria Norsan is member of Golkar. However, the party did not endorse his candidacy and backed another ticket. He ran under PDI-P ticket.)
Central Kalimantan (details)	Sugianto Sabran (PDI-P)	Agustiar Sabran (Gerindra)	
South Kalimantan (details)	Sahbirin Noor (Golkar)	Muhidin (PAN)	
East Kalimantan (details)	Isran Noor (Nasdem)	Rudy Mas'ud (Golkar)	
North Kalimantan (details)	Zainal Arifin Paliwang (Gerindra)	Zainal Arifin Paliwang (Gerindra)	
Bali (details)	I Wayan Koster (PDI-P)	I Wayan Koster (PDI-P)	
West Nusa Tenggara (details)	Zulkieflimansyah (PKS)	Lalu Muhamad Iqbal (Gerindra)	
East Nusa Tenggara (details)	Viktor Laiskodat (Nasdem)	Emanuel Melkiades Laka Lena (Golkar)	
North Sulawesi (details)	Olly Dondokambey (PDI-P)	Yulius Selvanus (Gerindra)	
Gorontalo (details)	Rusli Habibie (Golkar)	Gusnar Ismail (Demokrat)	
Central Sulawesi (details)	Rusdy Mastura (Gerindra)	Anwar Hafid (Demokrat)	
Southeast Sulawesi (details)	Ali Mazi (Nasdem)	Andi Sumangerukka (Gerindra)	
West Sulawesi (details)	Ali Baal Masdar (Golkar)	Suhardi Duka (Demokrat)	
South Sulawesi (details)	Andi Sudirman Sulaiman (Gerindra)	Andi Sudirman Sulaiman (Gerindra)	
Maluku (details)	Murad Ismail	Hendrik Lewerissa (Gerindra)	
North Maluku (details)	Abdul Ghani Kasuba	Sherly Tjoanda (Demokrat)	
Papua (details)	Lukas Enembe (Demokrat)	Mathius Fakhiri (Golkar)	
West Papua (details)	Dominggus Mandacan (Nasdem)	Dominggus Mandacan (Nasdem)	
Southwest Papua (details)	First election	Elisa Kambu (Gerindra)	(Note: Elisa Kambu was a member of PDI-P during the election, but did not receive the party's backing to run. He was fired from the party on 17 December 2024.)
Central Papua (details)	First election	Meki Fritz Nawipa (PDI-P)	
Highland Papua (details)	First election	John Tabo (Golkar)	
South Papua (details)	First election	Apolo Safanpo (Golkar)	

=== Mayoral ===
Elections for mayors are held in all cities, except for the five cities which are constituents of Jakarta with their mayors being appointed by the Governor of Jakarta. The table below contains all mayoral races, sorted by population in descending order.

City	Previous mayor	Elected mayor	Notes
Surabaya (details)	Eri Cahyadi (PDI-P)	Eri Cahyadi (PDI-P)	
Bekasi (details)	Tri Adhianto Tjahyono (PDI-P)	Tri Adhianto Tjahyono (PDI-P)	
Bandung (details)	Yana Mulyana (Gerindra)	Muhammad Farhan (Nasdem)	
Medan (details)	Bobby Nasution (Gerindra)	Rico Waas (Nasdem)	
Depok (details)	Mohammad Idris (PKS)	Supian Suri (Gerindra)	
Tangerang (details)	Arief Rachadiono Wismansyah (Demokrat)	Sachrudin (Golkar)	
Palembang (details)	Harnojoyo (Demokrat)	Ratu Dewa	
Semarang (details)	Hevearita Gunaryanti Rahayu (PDI-P)	Agustina Wilujeng Pramestuti (PDI-P)	
Makassar (details)	Danny Pomanto (PDI-P)	Munafri Arifuddin (Golkar)	
South Tangerang (details)	Benyamin Davnie (Golkar)	Benyamin Davnie (Golkar)	
Batam (details)	Muhammad Rudi (Nasdem)	Amsakar Achmad (Nasdem)	
Bandar Lampung (details)	Eva Dwiana (PDI-P)	Eva Dwiana (PDI-P)	(Note: Eva Dwiana is a registered member of PDI-P as of the election date. However, she did not receive the party's backing to run.)
Bogor (details)	Bima Arya (PAN)	Dedie Rachim (PAN)	
Cirebon (details)	Eti Herawati (Nasdem)	Effendi Edo (Golkar)	
Pekanbaru (details)	Firdaus (Demokrat)	Agung Nugroho (Demokrat)	
Padang (details)	Hendri Septa (PAN)	Fadly Amran (Nasdem)	
Malang (details)	Sutiaji (Demokrat)	Wahyu Hidayat (Gerindra)	
Samarinda (details)	Andi Harun (Gerindra)	Andi Harun (Gerindra)	
Denpasar (details)	I Gusti Ngurah Jaya Negara (PDI-P)	I Gusti Ngurah Jaya Negara (PDI-P)	
Tasikmalaya (details)	Muhammad Yusuf (Golkar)	Viman Alfarizi Ramadhan (Gerindra)	
Serang (details)	Syafrudin Syafe'i (PAN)	Budi Rustandi (Gerindra)	
Balikpapan (details)	Rahmad Mas'ud (Golkar)	Rahmad Mas'ud (Golkar)	
Pontianak (details)	Edi Rusdi Kamtono (Gerindra)	Edi Rusdi Kamtono (Gerindra)	
Banjarmasin	Ibnu Sina (Demokrat)	Muhammad Yamin HR (Gerindra)	
Jambi	Syarif Fasha (Nasdem)	Maulana (PAN)	
Cimahi (details)	Ngatiyana	Ngatiyana	
Surakarta (details)	Teguh Prakosa (PDI-P)	Respati Ardi (Gerindra)	
Manado (details)	Andrei Angouw (PDI-P)	Andrei Angouw (PDI-P)	
Kupang (details)	Jefri Riwu Kore (Demokrat)	Christian Widodo (PSI)	
Cilegon	Helldy Agustian (Gerindra)	Robinsar (Golkar)	
Mataram (details)	Mohan Roliskana (Golkar)	Mohan Roliskana (Golkar)	
Jayapura	Benhur Tomi Mano (PDI-P)	Abisai Rollo (Golkar)	
Bengkulu	Helmi Hasan (PAN)	Dedy Wahyudi (PAN)	
Yogyakarta	Haryadi Suyuti (Golkar)	Hasto Wardoyo (PDI-P)	
Palu	Hadianto Rasyid (Hanura)	Hadianto Rasyid (Hanura)	
Ambon	Richard Louhenapessy (Golkar)	Bodewin Wattimena	
Sukabumi	Achmad Fahmi (PKS)	Ayep Zaki (Nasdem)	
Kendari	Sulkarnain Kadir (PKS)	Siska Karina Imran (Nasdem)	
Dumai	Paisal (Nasdem)	Paisal (Nasdem)	
Pekalongan	Achmad Afzan Arslan Djunaid (PDI-P)	Achmad Afzan Arslan Djunaid (PDI-P)	
Palangka Raya	Farid Naparin (Golkar)	Farid Naparin (Golkar)	
Binjai	Amir Hamzah (Demokrat)	Amir Hamzah (Demokrat)	
Kediri (details)	Abdullah Abu Bakar (PAN)	Vinanda Prameswati (Golkar)	
Sorong	Lamberthus Jitmau (Golkar)	Septinus Lobat	
Tegal	Dedy Yon Supriyono (Demokrat)	Dedy Yon Supriyono (Demokrat)	
Pematangsiantar	Susanti Dewayani (PAN)	Wesly Silalahi	
Banjarbaru	Aditya Mufti Ariffin (PPP) (Note: Disqualified by General Election Commission (KPU).)	Total 2025 repeat ordered by MK	
Banda Aceh (details)	Aminullah Usman (PAN)	Illiza Sa'aduddin Djamal (PPP)	
Tarakan	Khairul	Khairul	
Probolinggo	Hadi Zainal Abidin (PKB)	Aminuddin (Gerindra)	
Singkawang (details)	Chui Mie (PDI-P)	Chui Mie (PDI-P)	
Lubuklinggau	SN Sana Putra Sohe (PKB)	Rachmat Hidayat (Nasdem)	
Tanjungpinang	Rahma (Nasdem)	Lis Darmansyah (PDI-P)	
Bitung	Maurits Mantiri (PDI-P)	Hengky Honandar (Nasdem)	
Padangsidempuan	Isran Efendi Nasution (Golkar)	Letnan Dalimunthe	
Pangkalpinang	Maulan Aklil (PDI-P)	Repeat election in 2025	
Batu (details)	Dewanti Rumpoko (PDI-P)	Nurochman (PKB)	
Pasuruan	Saifullah Yusuf (PKB)	Adi Wibowo (Golkar)	
Ternate	Tauhid Soleman (Nasdem)	Tauhid Soleman (Nasdem)	
Banjar	Ade Uu Sukaesih (Golkar)	Sudarsono (Golkar)	
Gorontalo	Marten Taha (Golkar)	Adhan Dambea (PAN)	
Madiun	Maidi	Maidi	
Prabumulih	Ridho Yahya (Golkar)	Arlan (Gerindra)	
Salatiga	Yuliyanto (Gerindra)	Robby Hernawan	
Lhokseumawe	Tengku Suaidi Yahya (PA)	Sayuti Abubakar (PNA)	
Langsa	Usman Abdullah (PA)	Jeffry Sentana (PAN)	
Palopo	Muhammad Judas Amir (Nasdem)	Total 2025 repeat ordered by MK	
Bontang	Basri Rase (PKB)	Neni Moerniaeni (Golkar)	
Tanjungbalai	Waris Thalib (PDI-P)	Mahyaruddin Salim (Golkar)	
Tebing Tinggi	Umar Zunaidi Hasibuan	Iman Irdian Saragih (PDI-P)	
Metro	Wahdi (PDI-P)	Bambang Iman Santoso (Demokrat)	
Baubau	La Ode Ahmad Monianse (PDI-P)	Yusran Fahim (PPP)	
Bima	Muhammad Lutfi (Golkar)	Abdul Rahman (Demokrat)	
Parepare	Taufan Pawe (Golkar)	Tasming Hamid (Nasdem)	
Blitar	Santoso (PDI-P)	Syauqul Muhibbin (PKB)	
Pagar Alam	Alpian Maskoni (Nasdem)	Ludi Oliansyah	
Payakumbuh	Riza Falepi (PKS)	Zulmaeta	
Gunungsitoli	Sowa'a Laoli (PDI-P)	Sowa'a Laoli (PDI-P)	
Mojokerto	Ika Puspitasari (PDI-P)	Ika Puspitasari (PDI-P)	
Kotamobagu	Tatong Bara (Nasdem)	Weny Gaib (PKB)	
Magelang	Muchamad Nur Aziz (Demokrat)	Damar Prasetyono (PDI-P)	
Bukittinggi	Erman Safar (Gerindra)	Ramlan Nurmatias (Demokrat)	
Tidore	Ali Ibrahim (PDI-P)	Muhammad Sinen (PDI-P)	
Tomohon	Caroll Senduk (PDI-P)	Caroll Senduk (PDI-P)	
Sungai Penuh	Ahmadi Zubir (PDI-P)	Alfin	
Pariaman	Genius Umar	Yota Balad	
Subulussalam	Affan Alfian Bintang (Hanura)	Rasyid Bancin (Gerindra)	
Sibolga	Jamaluddin Pohan (Nasdem)	Akhmad Syukri Nazri Penarik (Nasdem)	
Tual	Adam Rahayaan (PKS)	Akhmad Yani Renuat	
Solok	Zul Efian Umar (Nasdem)	Ramadhani Kirana Putra (Nasdem)	
Sawahlunto	Deri Asta (PAN)	Riyanda Putra (Gerindra)	
Padang Panjang	Fadly Amran (Nasdem)	Hendri Arnis	
Sabang	Nazaruddin (PA)	Partial 2025 repeat ordered by MK	

=== Regency ===
Elections for regents are held in all regencies, except for Thousand Islands Regency which is a constituent of Jakarta and has its regent appointed by the Governor of Jakarta.

==== Sumatra ====
Regency	Previous regent	Elected regent	Notes
Aceh
West Aceh	Ramli MS (PA)	Tarmizi (PA)	
Southwest Aceh	Akmal Ibrahim	Safaruddin (Gerindra)	
Aceh Besar	Mawardi Ali (PAN)	Muharram Idris	
Aceh Jaya	Teuku Irfan TB (Gerindra)	Safwandi (PA)	
South Aceh	Amran (PNA)	Mirwan MS (Gerindra)	
Aceh Singkil	Dulmusrid (Golkar)	Safriadi Manik (PNA)	
Aceh Tamiang	Mursil	Armia Fahmi (PA)	
Central Aceh	Shabela Abubakar	Haili Yoga	
Southeast Aceh	Raidin Pinim	Muhammad Salim Fakhry (Golkar)	
East Aceh	Hasballah M Thaib (PA)	Iskandar Al Farlaky (PA)	
North Aceh	Muhammad Thaib (PA)	Ismail A Jalil (PA)	
Bener Meriah	Sarkawi	Tagore Abu Bakar (Gerindra)	
Bireuen	Muzakkar A Gani (Demokrat)	Mukhlis (Golkar)	
Gayo Lues	Muhammad Amru (PA)	Suhaidi	
Nagan Raya	M Jamin Idham (Demokrat)	TR Keumangan (Golkar)	
Pidie	Roni Ahmad	Sarjani Abdullah (PA)	
Pidie Jaya	Aiyub Abbas (PA)	Sibral Malasyi (PAS Aceh)	
Simeulue	Erli Hasim (PBB)	Mohammad Nasrun	
North Sumatra
Asahan	Surya (Golkar)	Taufik Zainal Abidin	
Batubara	Zahir (PDI-P)	Baharuddin Siagian	
Dairi	Eddy Keleng Ate Berutu (Golkar)	Vickner Sinaga (Golkar)	
Deli Serdang	Ali Yusuf Siregar (Nasdem)	Asri Ludin Tambunan (Golkar)	
Humbang Hasundutan	Dosmar Banjarnahor (Golkar)	Oloan P Nababan (PDI-P)	
Karo	Cory Sriwaty Sebayang (Gerindra)	Antonius Ginting	
Labuhanbatu	Erik Adtrada Ritonga (Golkar)	Maya Hasmita	
South Labuhanbatu	Edimin (PDI-P)	Fery Sahputra Simatupang	
North Labuhanbatu	Hendri Yanto Sitorus (Golkar)	Hendri Yanto Sitorus (Golkar)	
Langkat	Terbit Rencana Perangin Angin (Golkar)	Syah Afandin (PAN)	
Mandailing Natal	Jafar Sukhairi Nasution (PKB)	Saipullah Nasution (Golkar)	
Nias	Ya'atulo Gulo (PDI-P)	Ya'atulo Gulo (PDI-P)	
West Nias	Khenoki Waruwu (Hanura)	Eliyunus Waruwu (PDI-P)	
South Nias	Hilarius Duha (PDI-P)	Sokhiatulo Laia	
North Nias	Amizaro Waruwu (PAN)	Amizaro Waruwu (PAN)	
Padang Lawas	Ali Sutan Harahap (Golkar)	Putra Mahkota Alam	
North Padang Lawas	Andar Amin Harahap (Golkar)	Reski Basyah Harahap	
Pakpak Bharat	Franc Bernhard Tumanggor (Golkar)	Franc Bernhard Tumanggor (Golkar)	
Samosir	Vandiko Timotius Gultom (Nasdem)	Vandiko Timotius Gultom (Nasdem)	
Serdang Bedagai	Darma Wijaya (PDI-P)	Darma Wijaya (PDI-P)	
Simalungun	Radiapoh Hasiholan Sinaga	Anton Achmad Saragih	
South Tapanuli	Dolly Pasaribu (Gerindra)	Gus Irawan Pasaribu (Gerindra)	
Central Tapanuli	Bakhtiar Ahmad Sibarani (Nasdem)	Masinton Pasaribu (PDI-P)	
North Tapanuli (details)	Nikson Nababan (PDI-P)	Jonius Taripar Parsaoran Hutabarat (Perindo)	
Toba	Poltak Sitorus	Effendi Napitupulu (Nasdem)	
West Sumatra
Agam	Andri Warman (PAN)	Benni Warlis (PKS)	
Dharmasraya	Sutan Riska Tuanku Kerajaan (PDI-P)	Annisa Suci Ramadhani	
Mentawai Islands	Yudas Sabaggalet (PDI-P)	Rinto Wardana	
Lima Puluh Kota	Safaruddin Dt Bandaro Rajo (Golkar)	Safni (PDI-P)	
Padang Pariaman	Suhatri Bur (PAN)	John Kenedy Azis (Golkar)	
Pasaman	Sabar AS (Demokrat)	Total 2025 repeat ordered by MK	
West Pasaman	Hamsuardi (PAN)	Yulianto (Demokrat)	
South Pesisir	Rusma Yul Anwar (PDI-P)	Hendrajoni (Nasdem)	
Sijunjung	Benny Dwifa Yuswir (Golkar)	Benny Dwifa Yuswir (Golkar)	
Solok	Epyardi Asda (PAN)	Jon Firman Pandu (Gerindra)	
South Solok	Khairunas (Golkar)	Khairunas (Golkar)	
Tanah Datar	Eka Putra (Demokrat)	Eka Putra (Demokrat)	
Jambi
Batanghari	Muhammad Fadhil Arief (PPP)	Muhammad Fadhil Arief (PPP)	
Bungo	Mashuri (Demokrat)	Partial 2025 repeat ordered by MK	
Kerinci	Adirozal (PAN)	Monadi (PAN)	
Merangin	Mashuri (PPP)	M Syukur	
Muaro Jambi	Masnah Busro (PAN)	Zuwanda	
Sarolangun	Cek Endra (Golkar)	Hurmin (PPP)	
West Tanjung Jabung	Anwar Sadat (PAN)	Anwar Sadat (PAN)	
East Tanjung Jabung	Romi Hariyanto (PAN)	Dillah Hikmah Sari (PAN)	
Tebo	Sukandar (Golkar)	Agus Rubiyanto (Golkar)	
Riau
Bengkalis	Kasmarni	Kasmarni	
Indragiri Hilir	Muhammad Wardan (Gerindra)	Ade Agus Hartanto (PKB)	
Indragiri Hulu	Rezita Meylani Topi	Herman (Nasdem)	
Kampar	Catur Sugeng Susanto (Gerindra)	Ahmad Yuzar	
Meranti Islands	Muhammad Adil (PDI-P)	Asmar (PKB)	
Kuantan Singingi	Suhardiman Amby (Gerindra)	Suhardiman Amby (Gerindra)	
Pelalawan	Zukri (PDI-P)	Zukri (PDI-P)	
Rokan Hilir	Afrizal Sintong (Golkar)	Bistamam (Golkar)	
Rokan Hulu	Sukiman (Gerindra)	Anton (Gerindra)	
Siak	Alfedri (PAN)	Partial 2025 repeat ordered by MK	
Riau Islands
Bintan	Roby Kurniawan (Golkar)	Roby Kurniawan (Golkar)	
Karimun	Aunur Rafiq (Golkar)	Iskandarsyah (PKS)	
Anambas Islands	Abdul Haris (PPP)	Aneng (Demokrat)	
Lingga	Muhammad Nizar (Nasdem)	Muhammad Nizar (Nasdem)	
Natuna	Wan Siswandi	Cen Sui Lan (Golkar)	
Bengkulu
South Bengkulu	Gusnan Mulyadi (Nasdem)	Partial 2025 repeat ordered by MK	
Central Bengkulu	Ferry Ramli (Nasdem)	Rachmat Riyanto	
North Bengkulu	Mian (PDI-P)	Arie Septia Adinata (PDI-P)	
Kaur	Lismidianto (PDI-P)	Gusril Pausi (Golkar)	
Kepahiang	Hidayattullah Sjahid (Perindo)	Zurdi Nata (Golkar)	
Lebong	Kopli Ansori (PAN)	Azhari	
Mukomuko	Sapuan	Choirul Huda (Golkar)	
Rejang Lebong	Syamsul Effendi (Golkar)	Muhammad Fikri (PAN)	
Seluma	Erwin Octavian (PPP)	Teddy Rahman (PDI-P)	
South Sumatra
Banyuasin	Askolani (PDI-P)	Askolani (PDI-P)	
Empat Lawang	Joncik Muhammad (PAN)	Total 2025 repeat ordered by MK	
Lahat	Cik Ujang (Demokrat)	Bursah Zarnubi	
Muara Enim	Juarsah (PKB)	Edison (Nasdem)	
Musi Banyuasin	Beni Hernedi (PDI-P)	M Toha	
Musi Rawas	Ratna Machmud (Golkar)	Ratna Machmud (Golkar)	
North Musi Rawas	Devi Suhartoni (PDI-P)	Devi Suhartoni (PDI-P)	
Ogan Ilir	Panca Wijaya Akbar	Panca Wijaya Akbar	
Ogan Komering Ilir	Iskandar (PAN)	Muchendi Mahzareki (Demokrat)	
Ogan Komering Ulu	Kuryana Azis (Nasdem)	Teddy Meilwansyah	
South Ogan Komering Ulu	Popo Ali Martopo (PPP)	Abusama	
East Ogan Komering Ulu	Lanosin (Nasdem)	Lanosin (Nasdem)	
Penukal Abab Lematang Ilir	Heri Amalindo (PDI-P)	Asgianto (Gerindra)	
Bangka Belitung Islands
Bangka	Mulkan (PDI-P)	Repeat election in 2025	
West Bangka	Markus (PDI-P)	Partial 2025 repeat ordered by MK	
South Bangka (details)	Riza Herdavid (PDI-P)	Riza Herdavid (PDI-P)	
Central Bangka	Algafry Rahman (Golkar)	Algafry Rahman (Golkar)	
Belitung	Sahani Saleh (Gerindra)	Djoni Alamsyah Hidayat	
East Belitung	Burhanudin (Golkar)	Kamarudin Muten (PDI-P)	
Lampung
West Lampung	Parosil Mabsus (PDI-P)	Parosil Mabsus (PDI-P)	
South Lampung	Nanang Ermanto (PDI-P)	Radityo Egi Pratama (PAN)	
Central Lampung	Musa Ahmad (Golkar)	Ardito Wijaya (PKB)	
East Lampung	Dawam Rahardjo (PKB)	Ela Siti Nuryamah (PKB)	
North Lampung	Budi Utomo	Hamartoni Ahadis	
Mesuji	Saply TH	Elfianah (Nasdem)	
Pesawaran	Dendi Ramadhona (Demokrat)	Total 2025 repeat ordered by MK	
West Pesisir	Agus Istiqlal (Nasdem)	Dedi Irawan (PPP)	
Pringsewu	Sujadi Saddat (PKB)	Riyanto Pamungkas (PKS)	
Tanggamus	Dewi Handajani (PDI-P)	Moh Saleh Asnawi (Nasdem)	
Tulang Bawang	Winarti (PDI-P)	Qudrotul Ikhwan By	
West Tulang Bawang	Umar Ahmad (PDI-P)	Novriwan Jaya	
Way Kanan	Raden Adipati Surya (Demokrat)	Ali Rahman	

==== Java ====
Regency	Previous regent	Elected regent	Notes
Banten
Lebak	Iti Octavia Jayabaya (Demokrat)	Mochamad Hasbi Jayabaya (PDI-P)	
Pandeglang	Irna Narulita (PDI-P)	Dewi Setiani (Gerindra)	
Serang	Ratu Tatu Chasanah (Golkar)	Total 2025 repeat ordered by MK	
Tangerang (details)	Ahmed Zaki Iskandar (Golkar)	Maesyal Rasyid (Gerindra)	
West Java
Bandung (details)	Dadang Supriatna (PKB)	Dadang Supriatna (PKB)	
West Bandung	Hengky Kurniawan (PDI-P)	Jeje Ritchie Ismail (PAN)	
Bekasi (details)	Eka Supria Atmaja (Golkar)	Ade Kuswara Kunang (PDI-P)	
Bogor (details)	Iwan Setiawan (Gerindra)	Rudy Susmanto (Gerindra)	
Ciamis	Herdiat Sunarya	Herdiat Sunarya	
Cianjur (details)	Herman Suherman (PDI-P)	Wahyu Ferdian (Gerindra)	
Cirebon (details)	Imron Rosyadi (PDI-P)	Imron Rosyadi (PDI-P)	
Garut (details)	Rudy Gunawan (Gerindra)	Abdusy Syakur Amin	
Indramayu	Nina Agustina (PDI-P)	Lucky Hakim (Nasdem)	
Karawang (details)	Aep Syaepuloh (PKS)	Aep Syaepuloh (PKS)	
Kuningan (details)	Acep Purnama (PDI-P)	Dian Rachmat Yanuar	
Majalengka	Karna Sobahi (PDI-P)	Eman Suherman (Gerindra)	
Pangandaran	Jeje Wiradinata (PDI-P)	Citra Pitriyami (PDI-P)	
Purwakarta	Anne Ratna Mustika (Golkar)	Saepul Bahri Binzein (Gerindra)	
Subang	Ruhimat (PDI-P)	Reynaldy Putra Andita (Golkar)	
Sukabumi (details)	Marwan Hamami (Golkar)	Asep Japar (Golkar)	
Sumedang	Dony Ahmad Munir (PPP)	Dony Ahmad Munir (PPP)	
Tasikmalaya	Ade Sugianto (PDI-P)	Total 2025 repeat ordered by MK	
Central Java
Banjarnegara	Budhi Sarwono	Amalia Desiana (PDI-P)	
Banyumas	Achmad Husein (PDI-P)	Sadewo Tri Lastiono (PDI-P)	
Batang	Wihaji (Golkar)	Faiz Kurniawan	
Blora	Arief Rohman (PKB)	Arief Rohman (PKB)	
Boyolali	Said Hidayat (PDI-P)	Agus Irawan	
Brebes	Idza Priyanti (PDI-P)	Paramitha Widya Kusuma (PDI-P)	
Cilacap	Tatto Suwarto Pamuji (Golkar)	Syamsul Aulya Rachman (PKB)	
Demak	Eisti'anah (PDI-P)	Eisti'anah (PDI-P)	
Grobogan	Sri Sumarni (PDI-P)	Setyo Hadi (PDI-P)	
Jepara	Dian Kristiandi (PDI-P)	Witiarso Utomo (PDI-P)	
Karanganyar	Juliyatmono (Golkar)	Rober Christanto (PDI-P)	
Kebumen	Arif Sugiyanto	Lilis Nuryani (Nasdem)	
Kendal	Dico Ganinduto (Golkar)	Dyah Kartika Permanasari (PDI-P)	
Klaten	Sri Mulyani (PDI-P)	Hamenang Wajar Ismoyo (PDI-P)	
Kudus	Hartopo (PDI-P)	Samani Intakoris (PKB)	
Magelang	Zaenal Arifin (PDI-P)	Grengseng Pamuji (PDI-P)	
Pati (details)	Haryanto (PDI-P)	Sudewo (Gerindra)	
Pekalongan	Fadia Arafiq (Golkar)	Fadia Arafiq (Golkar)	
Pemalang	Mansur Hidayat	Anom Widiyantoro	
Purbalingga	Dyah Hayuning Pratiwi (PDI-P)	Fahmi Muhammad Hanif (PKS)	
Purworejo	Yuli Hastuti (Golkar)	Yuli Hastuti (Golkar)	
Rembang	Abdul Hafidz (PPP)	Harno (Demokrat)	
Semarang	Ngesti Nugraha (PDI-P)	Ngesti Nugraha (PDI-P)	
Sragen	Kusdinar Untung Yuni Sukowati (PDI-P)	Sigit Pamungkas (Golkar)	
Sukoharjo	Etik Suryani (PDI-P)	Etik Suryani (PDI-P)	
Tegal (details)	Umi Azizah (PKB)	Ischak Maulana Rohman (PKB)	
Temanggung	Muhammad Al Khadziq (Golkar)	Agus Setyawan (PDI-P)	
Wonogiri	Joko Sutopo (PDI-P)	Setyo Sukarno (PDI-P)	
Wonosobo	Afif Nurhidayat (PDI-P)	Afif Nurhidayat (PDI-P)	
Yogyakarta Special Region
Bantul	Abdul Halim Muslih (PKB)	Abdul Halim Muslih (PKB)	
Gunungkidul	Sunaryanta	Endah Subekti Kuntariningsih (PDI-P)	
Kulon Progo	Sutedjo (PAN)	R Agung Setyawan	
Sleman	Kustini Sri Purnomo (PAN)	Harda Kiswaya	
East Java
Bangkalan (details)	Abdul Latif Amin Imron (PPP)	Lukman Hakim (PKB)	
Banyuwangi (details)	Ipuk Fiestiandani (PDI-P)	Ipuk Fiestiandani (PDI-P)	
Blitar	Rini Syarifah (PKB)	Rijanto (PDI-P)	
Bojonegoro (details)	Anna Mu'awanah (PKB)	Setyo Wahono (Gerindra)	
Bondowoso	Salwa Arifin (PPP)	Abdul Hamid Wahid (PKB)	
Gresik	Fandi Akhmad Yani (PDI-P)	Fandi Akhmad Yani (PDI-P)	
Jember (details)	Hendy Siswanto (Nasdem)	Muhammad Fawait (Gerindra)	
Jombang	Mundjidah Wahab (PPP)	Warsubi (Gerindra)	
Kediri	Hanindhito Himawan Pramana (PDI-P)	Hanindhito Himawan Pramana (PDI-P)	
Lamongan	Yuhronur Efendi	Yuhronur Efendi	
Lumajang	Thoriqul Haq (PKB)	Indah Amperawati (Gerindra)	
Madiun	Ahmad Dawami (Demokrat)	Hari Wuryanto	
Magetan	Suprawoto (Demokrat)	Partial 2025 repeat ordered by MK	
Malang (details)	Sanusi (PDI-P)	Sanusi (PDI-P)	
Mojokerto	Ikfina Fahmawati	Muhammad Al Barra (PAN)	
Nganjuk	Marhaen Djumadi (PDI-P)	Marhaen Djumadi (PDI-P)	
Ngawi	Ony Anwar Harsono (PDI-P)	Ony Anwar Harsono (PDI-P)	
Pacitan	Indrata Nur Bayuaji (Demokrat)	Indrata Nur Bayuaji (Demokrat)	
Pamekasan (details)	Baddrut Tamam (PKB)	Kholilurrahman	
Pasuruan	Irsyad Yusuf (PKB)	Mochamad Rusdi Sutejo (Gerindra)	
Ponorogo	Sugiri Sancoko (PDI-P)	Sugiri Sancoko (PDI-P)	
Probolinggo	Timbul Prihanjoko (PDI-P)	Muhammad Haris (Gerindra)	
Sampang (details)	Slamet Junaidi (Nasdem)	Slamet Junaidi (Nasdem)	
Sidoarjo	Ahmad Muhdlor Ali (PKB)	Subandi	
Situbondo	Karna Suswandi	Yusuf Rio Wahyu	
Sumenep (details)	Achmad Fauzi Wongsojudo (PDI-P)	Achmad Fauzi Wongsojudo (PDI-P)	
Trenggalek	Mochamad Nur Arifin (PDI-P)	Mochamad Nur Arifin (PDI-P)	
Tuban	Aditya Halindra Faridzky (Golkar)	Aditya Halindra Faridzky (Golkar)	
Tulungagung	Maryoto Birowo (PDI-P)	Gatut Sunu Wibowo	

==== Kalimantan ====
Regency	Previous regent	Elected regent	Notes
West Kalimantan
Bengkayang (details)	Sebastianus Darwis (Gerindra)	Sebastianus Darwis (Gerindra)	
Kapuas Hulu	Fransiskus Diaan (PDI-P)	Fransiskus Diaan (PDI-P)	
North Kayong	Citra Duani (Hanura)	Romi Wijaya	
Ketapang	Martin Rantan (Golkar)	Alexander Wilyo	
Kubu Raya	Muda Mahendrawan	Sujiwo (PDI-P)	
Landak	Karolin Margret Natasa (PDI-P)	Karolin Margret Natasa (PDI-P)	
Melawi	Dadi Sunarya Usfa Yursa (PAN)	Dadi Sunarya Usfa Yursa (PAN)	
Mempawah	Erlina (Golkar)	Erlina (Golkar)	
Sambas	Satono (Gerindra)	Satono (Gerindra)	
Sanggau	Yohanes Ontot (PDI-P)	Yohanes Ontot (PDI-P)	
Sekadau	Aron (Demokrat)	Aron (Demokrat)	
Sintang	Jarot Winarno (Nasdem)	Gregorius Herkulanus Bala (Gerindra)	
Central Kalimantan
South Barito	Eddy Raya Samsuri (Golkar)	Eddy Raya Samsuri (Golkar)	
East Barito	Ampera AY Mebas	M Yamin (PDI-P)	
North Barito	Nadalsyah (Demokrat)	Partial 2025 repeat ordered by MK	
Gunung Mas	Jaya Samaya Monong (Golkar)	Jaya Samaya Monong (Golkar)	
Kapuas	Ben Brahim S Bahat (Golkar)	Muhammad Wiyatno (PDI-P)	
Katingan	Sakariyas (PDI-P)	Saiful	
West Kotawaringin	Nurhidayah (Golkar)	Nurhidayah (Golkar)	
East Kotawaringin	Halikinnor (PDI-P)	Halikinnor (PDI-P)	
Lamandau	Hendra Lesmana (Golkar)	Rizky Aditya Putra (Gerindra)	
Murung Raya	Perdie M Yoseph (PDI-P)	Heriyus	
Pulang Pisau	Pudjirustaty Narang (PDI-P)	Ahmad Rifa'i (Golkar)	
Seruyan	Yulhaidir (PDI-P)	Ahmad Selanorwanda (Golkar)	
Sukamara	Windu Subagio	Masduki (PDI-P)	
South Kalimantan
Balangan	Abdul Hadi (PPP)	Abdul Hadi (PPP)	
Banjar	Saidi Mansyur (Nasdem)	Saidi Mansyur (Nasdem)	
Barito Kuala	Noormiliyani (Golkar)	Bahrul Ilmi (PPP)	
South Hulu Sungai	Achmad Fikry	Syafrudin Noor (Golkar)	
Central Hulu Sungai	Aulia Oktafiandi (Demokrat)	Samsul Rizal (Golkar)	
North Hulu Sungai	Abdul Wahid (Golkar)	Sahrujani (Golkar)	
Kotabaru	Sayed Jafar Al Idrus (Golkar)	Muh Rusli	
Tabalong	Anang Syakhfiani	Muhammad Noor Rifani	
Tanah Bumbu	Zairullah Azhar (PKB)	Andi Rudi Latif (Golkar)	
Tanah Laut	Sukamta (PPP)	Rahmat Trianto (Nasdem)	
Tapin	Arifin Arpan (Golkar)	Yamani (Golkar)	
East Kalimantan
Berau	Sri Juniarsih Mas (PKS)	Sri Juniarsih Mas (PKS)	
West Kutai (details)	Fransiskus Xaverius Yapan (PDI-P)	Frederick Edwin (PDI-P)	
Kutai Kartanegara	Edi Damansyah (PDI-P)	Total 2025 repeat ordered by MK	
East Kutai	Ardiansyah Sulaiman (PKS)	Ardiansyah Sulaiman (PKS)	
Mahakam Ulu	Bonifasius Belawan Geh (Gerindra)	Total 2025 repeat ordered by MK	
Paser	Fahmi Fadli (PKB)	Fahmi Fadli (PKB)	
Penajam North Paser	Hamdam Pongrewa (PAN)	Mudyat Noor (Nasdem)	
North Kalimantan
Bulungan	Syarwani (Golkar)	Syarwani (Golkar)	
Malinau	Wempi W Mawa (Demokrat)	Wempi W Mawa (Demokrat)	
Nunukan	Asmin Laura Hafid (Hanura)	Irwan Sabri	
Tana Tidung	Ibrahim Ali (PAN)	Ibrahim Ali (PAN)	

==== Lesser Sunda ====
Regency	Previous regent	Elected regent	Notes
Bali
Badung	I Nyoman Giri Prasta (PDI-P)	I Wayan Adi Arnawa (PDI-P)	
Bangli	Sang Nyoman Sedana Arta (PDI-P)	Sang Nyoman Sedana Arta (PDI-P)	
Buleleng	Putu Agus Suradyana (PDI-P)	Nyoman Sutjidra (PDI-P)	
Gianyar	I Made Agus Mahayastra (PDI-P)	I Made Agus Mahayastra (PDI-P)	
Jembrana	I Nengah Tamba (Demokrat)	I Made Kembang Hartawan (PDI-P)	
Karangasem	I Gede Dana (PDI-P)	I Gusti Putu Parwata	
Klungkung	I Nyoman Suwirta (PDI-P)	I Made Satria (PDI-P)	
Tabanan	I Komang Gede Sanjaya (PDI-P)	I Komang Gede Sanjaya (PDI-P)	
West Nusa Tenggara
Bima	Indah Dhamayanti Putri (Golkar)	Ady Mahyudi (PAN)	
Dompu	Kader Jaelani (Nasdem)	Bambang Firdaus (Gerindra)	
West Lombok	Sumiatun (Golkar)	Lalu Ahmad Zaini	
Central Lombok	Lalu Pathul Bahri (Gerindra)	Lalu Pathul Bahri (Gerindra)	
East Lombok	Sukiman Azmy	Haerul Warisin (Gerindra)	
North Lombok (details)	Djohan Sjamsu (PKB)	Najmul Akhyar (Perindo)	
Sumbawa	Mahmud Abdullah (Golkar)	Syarafuddin Jarot (Nasdem)	
West Sumbawa	Musyarifin (PDI-P)	Amar Nurmansyah	
East Nusa Tenggara
Alor	Amon Djobo (PAN)	Iskandar Lakamau (Gerindra)	
Belu	Agustinus Taolin	Willybrodus Lay (Demokrat)	
Ende	Djafar Achmad (PDI-P)	Yosef B. Badeoda (Demokrat)	
East Flores	Antonius Gege Hadjon (PDI-P)	Antonius Doni Dihem (Nasdem)	
Kupang	Korinus Masneno (Nasdem)	Yosef Lede (Gerindra)	
Lembata	Thomas Ola Langoday (Demokrat)	Petrus Kanisius Tuaq (PAN)	
Malaka	Simon Nahak (PDI-P)	Stefanus Bria Seran (Golkar)	
Manggarai	Herybertus G.L. Nabit (PDI-P)	Herybertus G.L. Nabit (PDI-P)	
West Manggarai	Edistasius Endi (Nasdem)	Edistasius Endi (Nasdem)	
East Manggarai	Agas Andreas (PAN)	Agas Andreas (PAN)	
Nagekeo	Johanes Don Bosco Do (Nasdem)	Simpllisius Donatus (PDI-P)	
Ngada	Andreas Paru (Golkar)	Raymundus Bena (Gerindra)	
Rote Ndao	Paulina Haning Bullu (Nasdem)	Paulus Henuk (Perindo)	
Sabu Raijua	Nikodemus Rihi Heke (Golkar)	Krisman Riwu Kore (PDI-P)	
Sikka (details)	Fransiskus Roberto Diogo (PDI-P)	Juventus Prima Yoris Kago (PSI)	
West Sumba	Yohanis Dade (Hanura)	Yohanis Dade (Hanura)	
Southwest Sumba	Kornelius Kodi Mete (PDI-P)	Ratu Ngadu Bonnu Wulla (Nasdem)	
Central Sumba	Paulus S.K. Limu (Nasdem)	Paulus S.K. Limu (Nasdem)	
East Sumba (details)	Khristofel Praing (Hanura)	Umbu Lili Pekuwali (Golkar)	
South Central Timor	Egusem Pieter Tahun (Golkar)	Eduard Markus Lioe	
North Central Timor	Juandi David (Golkar)	Yosep Falentinus (Demokrat)	

==== Sulawesi ====
Regency	Previous regent	Elected regent	Notes
South Sulawesi
Bantaeng	Ilham Syah Azikin (Gerindra)	Fathul Fauzy Nurdin (Golkar)	
Barru	Suardi Saleh (Nasdem)	Ina Kartika Sari (Golkar)	
Bone	Andi Fahsar M Padjalangi (Golkar)	Andi Asman Sulaiman	
Bulukumba	Muchtar Ali Yusuf (Gerindra)	Muchtar Ali Yusuf (Gerindra)	
Enrekang	Muslimin Bando (PAN)	Muh Yusuf R (Nasdem)	
Gowa	Adnan Purichta Ichsan (Golkar)	Sitti Husniah Talenrang (PAN)	
Jeneponto	Iksan Iskandar (Golkar)	Paris Yasir (Nasdem)	
Selayar Islands	Muhammad Basli Ali (Golkar)	Muhammad Natsir Ali (Golkar)	
Luwu	Basmin Mattayang (Nasdem)	Patahudding (Golkar)	
East Luwu	Budiman Hakim (PDIP)	Irwan Bachri Syam (Nasdem)	
North Luwu	Indah Putri Iriani (Golkar)	Andi Abdullah Rahim (Gerindra)	
Maros	Andi Syafril Chaidir Syam (PAN)	Andi Syafril Chaidir Syam (PAN)	
Pangkajene and Islands	Muhammad Yusran Lalogau (Nasdem)	Muhammad Yusran Lalogau (Nasdem)	
Pinrang	Irwan Hamid (Nasdem)	Irwan Hamid (Nasdem)	
Sidenreng Rappang	Dollah Mando (Gerindra)	Syaharuddin Alrif (Nasdem)	
Sinjai	Andi Seto Gadhista Asapa (Gerindra)	Ratnawati Arif	
Soppeng	Andi Kaswadi Razak (Golkar)	Suwardi Haseng (Golkar)	
Takalar	Syamsari Kitta (Gelora)	Firdaus Daeng Manye	
Tana Toraja	Theofilus Allorerung (Golkar)	Zadrak Tombeg (Gerindra)	
North Toraja	Yohanis Bassang (Golkar)	Frederik V Palimbong (Gerindra)	
Wajo	Amran Mahmud (PAN)	Andi Rosman	
West Sulawesi
Majene	Andi Achmad Syukri (Demokrat)	Andi Achmad Syukri (Demokrat)	
Mamasa	Ramlan Badawi (PAN)	Welem Sambolangi (Golkar)	
Mamuju	Sitti Sutinah (Demokrat)	Sitti Sutinah (Demokrat)	
Central Mamuju	Aras Tammauni (Golkar)	Arsal Aras (Demokrat)	
Pasangkayu	Yaumil Ambo Djiwa (Golkar)	Yaumil Ambo Djiwa (Golkar)	
Polewali Mandar	Andi Ibrahim Masdar (PDIP)	Samsul Mahmud (Golkar)	
Central Sulawesi
Banggai	Amirudin Tamoreka (Golkar)	Partial 2025 repeat ordered by MK	
Banggai Islands	Rais Adam	Rusli Moidady	
Banggai Laut	Sofyan Kaepa (Nasdem)	Sofyan Kaepa (Nasdem)	
Buol	Amirudin Rauf (Demokrat)	Risharyudi Triwibowo (PKB)	
Donggala	Mohammad Yasin (Gerindra)	Vera Elena Laruni (Perindo)	
Morowali	Taslim (Nasdem)	Iksan	
North Morowali	Delis Julkarson Hehi (Hanura)	Delis Julkarson Hehi (Hanura)	
Parigi Moutong	Samsurizal Tombolotutu (Gerindra)	Total 2025 repeat ordered by MK	
Poso	Verna Inkiriwang (Demokrat)	Verna Inkiriwang (Demokrat)	
Sigi	Mohamad Irwan Lapatta (Golkar)	Mohamad Rizal Intjenae (Golkar)	
Tojo Una-Una	Mohammad Lahay (Nasdem)	Ilham Lawidu (Golkar)	
Tolitoli	Amran Hi Yahya (PBB)	Amran Hi Yahya (PBB)	
Southeast Sulawesi
Bombana	Tafdil (PAN)	Burhanuddin (PKB)	
Buton	La Bakry (Golkar)	Alvin Akawijaya Putra (Nasdem)	
South Buton	La Ode Arusani (PDIP)	Muhammad Adios (Gerindra)	
Central Buton	Samahuddin (PDIP)	Azhari	
North Buton	Ridwan Zakariah (PAN)	Afirudin Mathara (Gerindra)	
Kolaka	Ahmad Safei (PDIP)	Amri Jamaluddin	
East Kolaka	Abdul Azis (Nasdem)	Abdul Azis (Nasdem)	
North Kolaka	Nur Rahman Umar (Nasdem)	Nur Rahman Umar (Nasdem)	
Konawe (details)	Kery Saiful Konggoasa (Nasdem)	Yusran Akbar (Golkar)	
Konawe Islands	Amrullah (Demokrat)	Rifqi Saifullah Razak (Demokrat)	
South Konawe	Surunuddin Dangga (Golkar)	Irham Kalenggo (Golkar)	
North Konawe	Ruksamin (PBB)	Ikbar (PBB)	
Muna	LM Rusman Emba (PDIP)	Bachrun (PDIP)	
West Muna	Achmad Lamani (PDIP)	La Ode Darwin (Nasdem)	
Wakatobi	Haliana (PDIP)	Haliana (PDIP)	
Gorontalo
Boalemo	Anas Jusuf (PAN)	Rum Pagau (Nasdem)	
Bone Bolango	Merlan Uloli (Nasdem)	Ismet Mile (Golkar)	
Gorontalo	Nelson Pomalingo (PPP)	Sofyan Puhi (Nasdem)	
North Gorontalo	Thariq Modanggu (Golkar)	Total 2025 repeat ordered by MK	
Pohuwato	Saipul A Mbuinga (Gerindra)	Saipul A Mbuinga (Gerindra)	
North Sulawesi
Bolaang Mongondow	Yasti Soepredjo Mokoagow (PDIP)	Yusra Alhabsyi (PKB)	
South Bolaang Mongondow	Iskandar Kamaru (PDIP)	Iskandar Kamaru (PDIP)	
East Bolaang Mongondow	Sam Sachrul Mamonto (Nasdem)	Oskar Manoppo (Demokrat)	
North Bolaang Mongondow	Depri Pontoh (PPP)	Sirajudin Lasena	
Sangihe Islands (details)	Jabes Gaghana (Golkar)	Michael Thungari (Nasdem)	
Sitaro Islands	Evangelian Sasingen (PDIP)	Chyntia Ingrid Kalangit (Golkar)	
Talaud Islands	Elly Engelbert Lasut (Demokrat)	Partial 2025 repeat ordered by MK	
Minahasa	Royke Octavian Roring (PDIP)	Robby Dondokambey (PDIP)	
South Minahasa	Franky Donny Wongkar (PDIP)	Franky Donny Wongkar (PDIP)	
Southeast Minahasa	James Sumendap (PDIP)	Ronald Kandoli (PDIP)	
North Minahasa	Joune James Esau Ganda (PDIP)	Joune James Esau Ganda (PDIP)	

==== Maluku ====
Regency	Previous regent	Elected regent	Notes
North Maluku
West Halmahera	James Uang (Demokrat)	James Uang (Demokrat)	
South Halmahera	Hasan Ali (PKS)	Hasan Ali (PKS)	
Central Halmahera	Edi Langkara	Ikram Malan (Golkar)	
East Halmahera	Ubaid Yakub (Gerindra)	Ubaid Yakub (Gerindra)	
North Halmahera	Frans Manery (Golkar)	Piet Hein Babua (Golkar)	
Sula Islands	Fifian Adeningsi Mus (PDIP)	Fifian Adeningsi Mus (PDIP)	
Morotai Island	Benny Laos (Demokrat)	Rusli Sibua	
Taliabu Island	Aliong Mus (Golkar)	Partial 2025 repeat ordered by MK	
Maluku
Buru	Ramly Ibrahim Umasugi (Golkar)	Partial 2025 repeat ordered by MK	
South Buru	Safitri Malik Soulisa (PDI-P)	Hamidi (PAN)	
Aru Islands	Johan Gonga (Nasdem)	Timotius Kaidel	
Tanimbar Islands	Petrus Fatlolon (Nasdem)	Ricky Jauwerissa (PSI)	
Central Maluku	Tuasikal Abua	Zulkarnain Awat Amir (Golkar)	
West Seram	Timotius Akerina (Nasdem)	Asri Arman (Demokrat)	
East Seram	Abdul Mukti Keliobas (Golkar)	Fachri Husni (PKS)	
South West Maluku	Benyamin Thomas Noach (PDI-P)	Benyamin Thomas Noach (PDI-P)	
South East Maluku	Muhammad Thaher Hanubun (Nasdem)	Muhammad Thaher Hanubun (Nasdem)	

==== Papua ====
Regency	Previous regent	Elected regent	Notes
Papua
Jayapura	Mathius Awoitauw (Nasdem)	Yunus Wonda (Demokrat)	
Yapen Islands	Tonny Tesar (Nasdem)	Benyamin Arisoy (Demokrat)	
Biak Numfor	Herry Ario Naap	Markus Mansnembra	
Sarmi	Eduard Fonataba	Dominggus Catue	
Keerom	Piter Gusbager (Golkar)	Piter Gusbager (Golkar)	
Waropen	Yermias Bisai (Demokrat)	Fransiscus Xaverius Mote (PDI-P)	
Supiori	Yan Imbab	Heronimus Mansoben	
Mamberamo Raya	John Tabo (Golkar)	Robby Wilson Rumansara (Golkar)	
West Papua
Fakfak	Untung Tamsil (Gerindra)	Samaun Dahlan	
Kaimana	Freddy Thie (Demokrat)	Hasan Achmad	
Teluk Wondama	Hendrik Syake Mambor	Elysa Auri	
Teluk Bintuni	Petrus Kasihiw (Nasdem)	Yohanis Manibuy	
Manokwari	Hermus Indou (PDI-P)	Hermus Indou (PDI-P)	
South Manokwari	Markus Waran	Bernard Mandacan	
Arfak Mountains	Yosias Saroy (PAN)	Dominggus Saiba	
Southwest Papua
Sorong	Johny Kamuru (Golkar)	Johny Kamuru (Golkar)	
South Sorong	Samsudin Anggiluli (PDI-P)	Petronela Krenak (PDI-P)	
Raja Ampat	Abdul Faris Umlati (Demokrat)	Orideko Iriano Burdam	
Tambrauw	Gabriel Asem (Golkar)	Yeskiel Yesnath (Demokrat)	
Maybrat	Bernard Sagrim (Golkar)	Karel Murafer (Demokrat)	
Central Papua
Nabire	Mesak Magai (PDI-P)	Mesak Magai (PDI-P)	
Puncak Jaya	Yuni Wonda (PDI-P)	Miren Kogoya	
Paniai	Meki Fritz Nawipa (PDI-P)	Yampit Nawipa	
Mimika	Eltinus Omaleng (Golkar)	Johannes Rettob (PDI-P)	
Puncak	Willem Wandik (PDI-P)	Elvis Tabuni	
Dogiyai	Yakobus Dumupa (PKB)	Yudas Tebai	
Intan Jaya	Natalis Tabuni (Nasdem)	Aner Maisini	
Deiyai	Ateng Edowai	Melkianus Mote	
Highland Papua
Jayawijaya	John Richard Banua Rouw (Demokrat)	Atenius Murip	
Bintang Mountains	Spei Yan Bidana	Spei Yan Bidana	
Yahukimo	Didimus Yahuli	Didimus Yahuli	
Tolikara	Usman Wanimbo (PAN)	Willem Wandik (Demokrat)	
Central Mamberamo	Ricky Ham Pagawak (Demokrat)	Yonas Kelenak	
Yalimo	Nahor Nekwek (Gerindra)	Nahor Nekwek (Gerindra)	
Lanny Jaya	Befa Yigibalom (Nasdem)	Aletinus Yigibalom	
Nduga	Wentius Nemiangge (Hanura)	Dinard Kelnea	
South Papua
Merauke	Romanus Mbaraka (Nasdem)	Yoseph Gebze	
Boven Digoel	Hengky Yaluwo (Demokrat)	Total 2025 repeat ordered by MK	
Mappi	Kristosimus Yohanes Agawemu (PKB)	Kristosimus Yohanes Agawemu (PKB)	
Asmat	Elisa Kambu (PDI-P)	Thomas Eppe Safanpo (PDI-P)	

== Results ==
=== Summary ===
This table lists elected candidates based on their political party affiliation at the time of the election. Candidates which are not a member of any political party are listed as independent regardless of endorsements from political parties.

Party	Governors	Mayors	Regents
Indonesian Democratic Party of Struggle	5 / 37	16 / 93	82 / 415
Golkar	5 / 37	14 / 93	63 / 415
Gerindra Party	14 / 37	13 / 93	41 / 415
NasDem Party	2 / 37	13 / 93	39 / 415
National Awakening Party	2 / 37	3 / 93	20 / 415
Prosperous Justice Party	1 / 37	0 / 93	9 / 415
Democratic Party	4 / 37	6 / 93	25 / 415
National Mandate Party	3 / 37	5 / 93	18 / 415
United Development Party	0 / 37	2 / 93	6 / 415
Perindo Party	0 / 37	0 / 93	4 / 415
Indonesian Solidarity Party	0 / 37	1 / 93	2 / 415
People's Conscience Party	0 / 37	1 / 93	2 / 415
Crescent Star Party	0 / 37	0 / 93	2 / 415
Aceh Party	1 / 37	1 / 93	6 / 415
Aceh Just and Prosperous Party	0 / 37	0 / 93	1 / 415
Nanggroe Aceh Party	0 / 37	1 / 93	1 / 415
Non-party members	0 / 37	16 / 93	77 / 415
Blank box	0 / 37	1 / 93	1 / 415
Total	37/37	93/93	399/415

=== Analysis ===
Map of voter turnout in each city and regency

Prabowo's party Gerindra made significant gains in gubernatorial races, placing party members in the governorships of North Sumatra, Banten, West Java, and Central Java among others. Despite being in a national coalition with Gerindra, second-largest party Golkar lost the governorships of Banten and West Java, and failed to regain Riau. The Indonesian Democratic Party of Struggle (PDI-P) suffered major defeats in the gubernatorial races for Central Java and East Java – provinces which had previously been considered as their strongholds. This was attributed to the direct participation of Joko Widodo and Prabowo Subianto in campaigning for Ahmad Luthfi and Khofifah Indar Parawansa in the two respective provinces. However, PDI-P retained the governorship of Bali and regained Jakarta.

The Prosperous Justice Party (PKS) also suffered defeats in its erstwhile strongholds in West Java and the Greater Jakarta area, losing the mayoralty of Depok which had been held by PKS since the first election in 2006. The National Awakening Party and the NasDem Party, which had endorsed Anies Baswedan in the presidential election before joining the government coalition, also suffered key losses and lost significant voter loyalty.

Ten incumbent governors running for re-election were defeated. In the mayoral and regency elections for Pangkalpinang and Bangka Regency, the incumbent candidates running uncontested failed to win 50 percent of votes against blank boxes, with repeat elections being scheduled for September 2025.

Voter turnout was recorded at about 71 percent, a significant decline from 76 percent in the 2020 local elections and 81 percent in the February 2024 general election.

== Aftermath ==
After voting at his registered polling station in Bojong Koneng, West Java, President Prabowo Subianto viewed that the election process was conducted smoothly. He asked all Indonesians to vote for their preferred candidates and for all candidates to work together no matter whoever won the election in their respective regions. Prabowo also expressed his hopes that any criticisms on the electoral process may be used to improve the next election cycle. Former President Joko Widodo congratulated to winning candidates, advising them to "not be arrogant if they win," while advising the losing candidates to accept the results with grace. He also praised the electoral process, saying that it was smooth and calm overall.

Former President and current PDI-P chairwoman Megawati Sukarnoputri expressed her thoughts after watching results trickling from various regions such as Banten, North Sumatra, East Java, Central Java and North Sulawesi. She criticised the result of some elections as unfair and worried that the sovereignty of the people were being manipulated. She expressed her disappointment at the results, particularly in the Central Java gubernatorial election, as she believed that her party nominee, Andika Perkasa and Hendrar Prihadi would have won if the election was conducted fairly. In response to PDI-P's claims of elections being stolen, PSI satirically advices PDI-P to accept the results with grace and reflect instead of throwing tantrums.

=== Lawsuits ===
By 11 December 2024, the Constitutional Court of Indonesia reported that 240 lawsuits related to the election results had been filed with the court. By February 2025, 310 had been filed in total, with 270 being dismissed before trial. Of the 40 remaining cases, three were gubernatorial elections (Bangka Belitung, Papua and Highland Papua), three mayoral elections (Palopo, Sabang, and Banjarbaru), and the remaining 34 regency elections. The elected governors, mayor and regents were be sworn in simultaneously on 20 February 2025 in Jakarta, except for Acehnese regional leaders who were sworn in on 17 February 2025 in Banda Aceh.

Following constitutional court rulings, 24 repeat votes would be held: one gubernatorial (Papua), three mayoral, and 20 regency. Out of the 26 elections, fourteen involved a complete repeat election covering all polling stations, while the others are limited to either certain districts or precincts.
