= 2024 Sukabumi regency election =

Local election in Indonesia

- 27 November 2024
Regent before election
Marwan Hamami
Golkar
Elected Regent
TBD

The 2024 Sukabumi regency election will be held on 27 November 2024 as part of nationwide local elections to elect the regent of Sukabumi Regency for a five-year term. The previous election was held in 2020.

== Electoral system ==
The election, like other local elections in 2024, follow the first-past-the-post system where the candidate with the most votes wins the election, even if they do not win a majority. It is possible for a candidate to run uncontested, in which case the candidate is still required to win a majority of votes "against" an "empty box" option. Should the candidate fail to do so, the election will be repeated on a later date.

== Candidates ==
According to electoral regulations, in order to qualify for the election, candidates are required to secure support from a political party or a coalition of parties controlling 10 seats in the Sukabumi Regency Regional House of Representatives (DPRD). Golkar, with 10 seats, is the only party eligible to nominate a candidate without forming a coalition with other parties. Candidates may alternatively demonstrate support in form of photocopies of identity cards, which in Sukabumi's case corresponds to 129,859 copies. According to the General Elections Commission (KPU), two such candidates communicated their intent to run, but ended up not registering.

The previous regent, Marwan Hamami, has served two terms and was ineligible to run in the election.

=== Potential ===
The following are individuals who have either been publicly mentioned as a potential candidate by a political party in the DPRD, publicly declared their candidacy with press coverage, or considered as a potential candidate by media outlets:

- Iyos Somantri (Demokrat), incumbent vice regent.
- Asep Japar, former head of the regency's public works department.

== Political map ==
Following the 2024 Indonesian legislative election, eight political parties are represented in the Sukabumi DPRD:

Political parties	Seat count
Party of Functional Groups (Golkar)	10 / 50
Great Indonesia Movement Party (Gerindra)	7 / 50
National Awakening Party (PKB)	7 / 50
Prosperous Justice Party (PKS)	7 / 50
Indonesian Democratic Party of Struggle (PDI-P)	6 / 50
Democratic Party (Demokrat)	5 / 50
United Development Party (PPP)	5 / 50
National Mandate Party (PAN)	3 / 50
