= 2024 Garut regency election =

Local election in Indonesia

- 27 November 2024
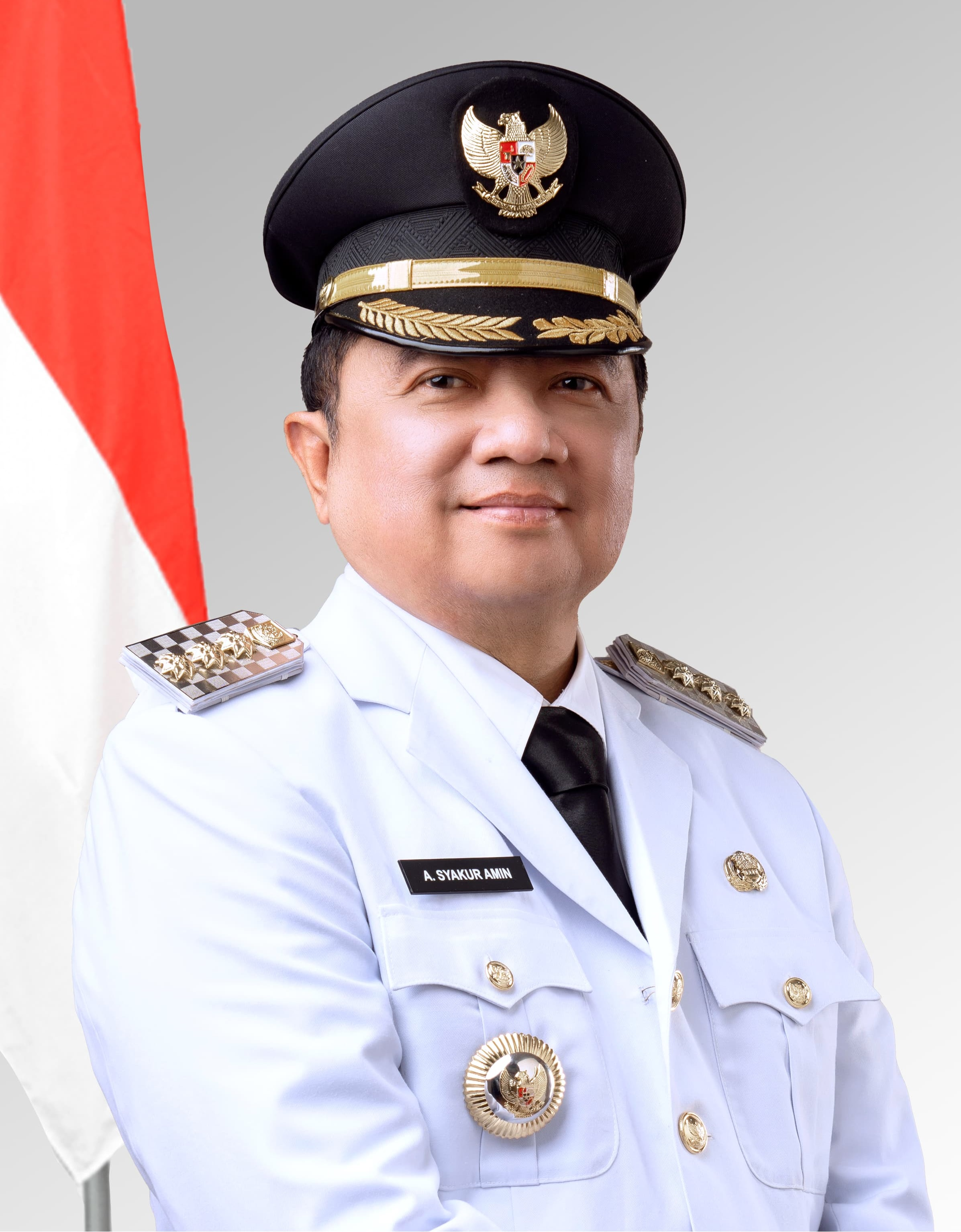

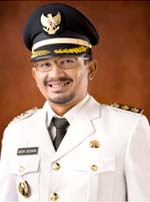
Candidate	Abdusy Syakur Amin	Helmi Budiman
Party	Golkar	PKS
Running mate	Luthfianisa Putri Karlina	Yudi Lasminingrat
Popular vote	915,780	465,365
Percentage	66.31%	33.69%
Regent before election
Rudy Gunawan
Gerindra
Elected Regent
Abdusy Syakur Amin
Golkar

The 2024 Garut regency election was held on 27 November 2024 as part of nationwide local elections to elect the regent of Garut Regency for a five-year term. The previous election was held in 2018.

== Electoral system ==
The election, like other local elections in 2024, follow the first-past-the-post system where the candidate with the most votes wins the election, even if they do not win a majority. It is possible for a candidate to run uncontested, in which case the candidate is still required to win a majority of votes "against" an "empty box" option. Should the candidate fail to do so, the election will be repeated on a later date.

== Candidates ==
According to electoral regulations, in order to qualify for the election, candidates are required to secure support from a political party or a coalition of parties controlling 10 seats in the Garut Regional House of Representatives (DPRD). As no political parties won 10 or more seats in the 2024 Indonesian legislative election, parties are required to form coalitions in order to nominate a candidate. Candidates may alternatively demonstrate support in form of photocopies of identity cards, which in Garut's case corresponds to 129,939 copies. Three candidates registered for the election in this manner, including former regent Aceng Fikri, but none submitted sufficient proofs of support to run in the election.

The previous regent, Rudy Gunawan, had served two full terms and was therefore ineligible to run in the election.

=== Declared ===
These are candidates who have been allegedly delegated by political parties endorsing for regency election:

1
Candidate from PKS and PPP
Helmi Budiman	Yudi Nugraha Lasminingrat
for Regent	for Vice Regent
Vice Regent of Garut (2014–2024)	Chairman of the Garut Regency Chamber of Commerce and Industry
Parties
14 / 50 (28%) PKS (7 seats); PPP (7 seats)

2
Candidate from Golkar and Gerindra
Abdusy Syakur Amin	Luthfianisa Putri Karlina
for Regent	for Vice Regent
Rector of Garut University	Dentist and businesswoman, Daughter of Jakarta Metropolitan Police chief Karyoto
Parties
36 / 50 (72%) Golkar (8 seats); PKB (8 seats); Gerindra (7 seats); PDI-P (4 seats); Demokrat (4 seats); Nasdem (3 seats); PAN (2 seats)

=== Potential ===
The following are individuals who have either been publicly mentioned as a potential candidate by a political party in the DPRD, publicly declared their candidacy with press coverage, or considered as a potential candidate by media outlets:

- Helmi Budiman (PKS), previous two-term vice regent (2014–2024) and chairman of PKS' Garut branch.
- Aceng Fikri, former regent (2009–2014).
- Diah Kurniasari (Nasdem), chairman of Nasdem's Garut branch, wife of Rudy Gunawan.
- Luthfianisa Putri Karlina, dentist and businesswoman, daughter of Jakarta Metropolitan Police chief Karyoto.

== Political map ==
Following the 2024 Indonesian legislative election, nine political parties are represented in the Garut DPRD:

Political parties	Seat count
Party of Functional Groups (Golkar)	8 / 50
National Awakening Party (PKB)	8 / 50
Great Indonesia Movement Party (Gerindra)	7 / 50
United Development Party (PPP)	7 / 50
Prosperous Justice Party (PKS)	7 / 50
Indonesian Democratic Party of Struggle (PDI-P)	4 / 50
Democratic Party (Demokrat)	4 / 50
NasDem Party	3 / 50
National Mandate Party (PAN)	2 / 50

== Results ==
Candidate	Running mate	Party	Votes	%
Abdusy Syakur Amin	Luthfianisa Putri Karlina	Golkar	915,780	66.31
Helmi Budiman	Yudi Nugraha Lasminingrat	Prosperous Justice Party	465,365	33.69
Total			1,381,145	100.00
Valid votes			1,381,145	97.27
Invalid/blank votes			38,809	2.73
Total votes			1,419,954	100.00
Registered voters/turnout			2,005,168	70.81
Source: KPU
