= 2024 West Sulawesi gubernatorial election =

- 27 November 2024
- Turnout: 76.12% (▲1.28pp)
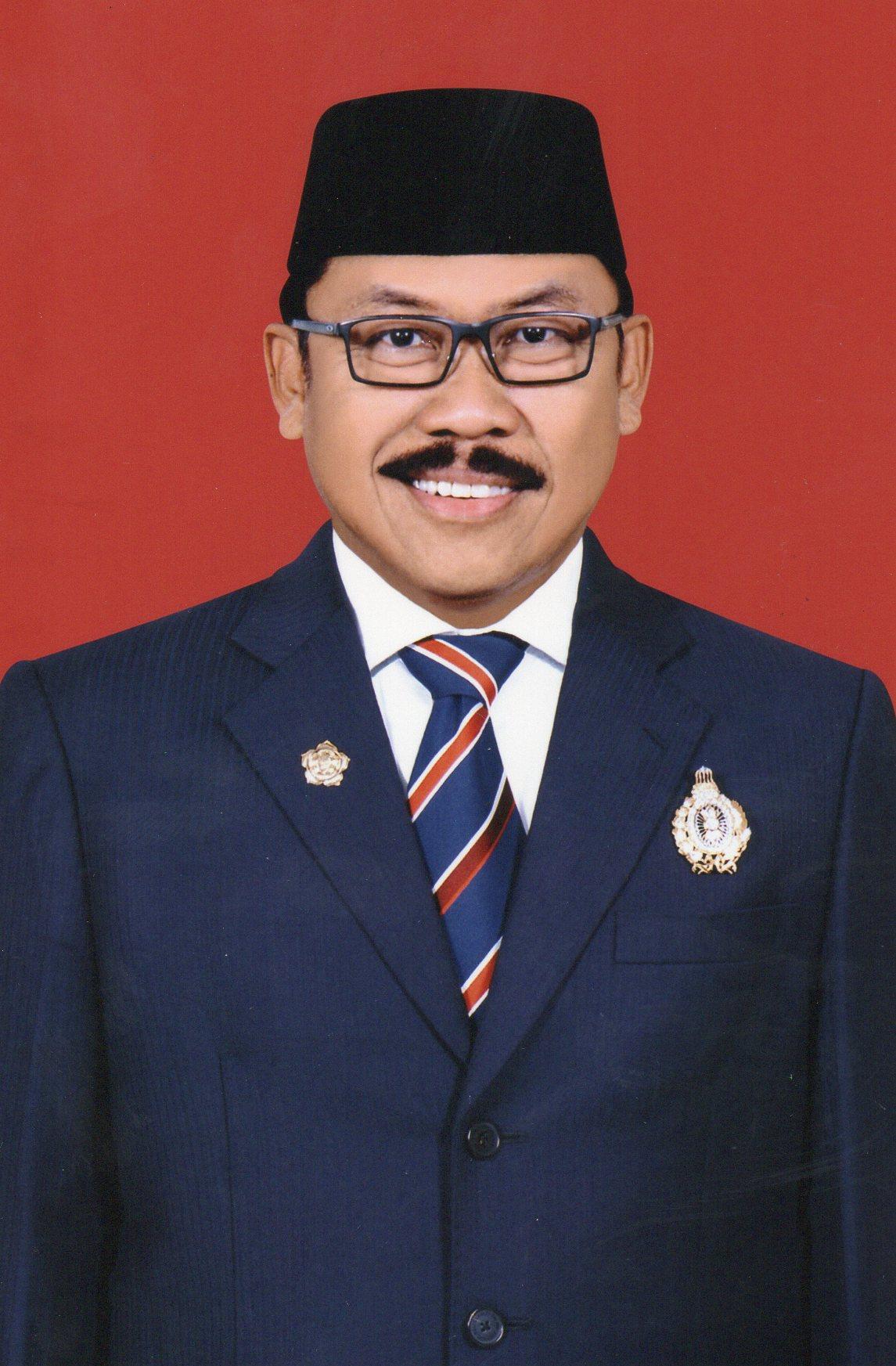

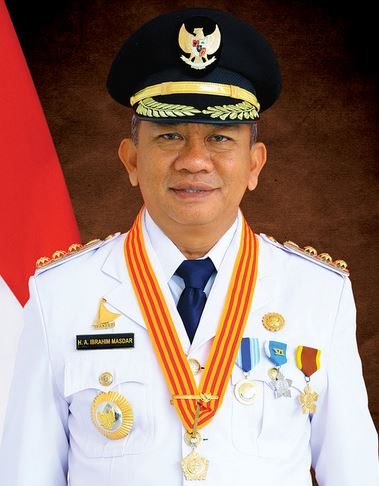

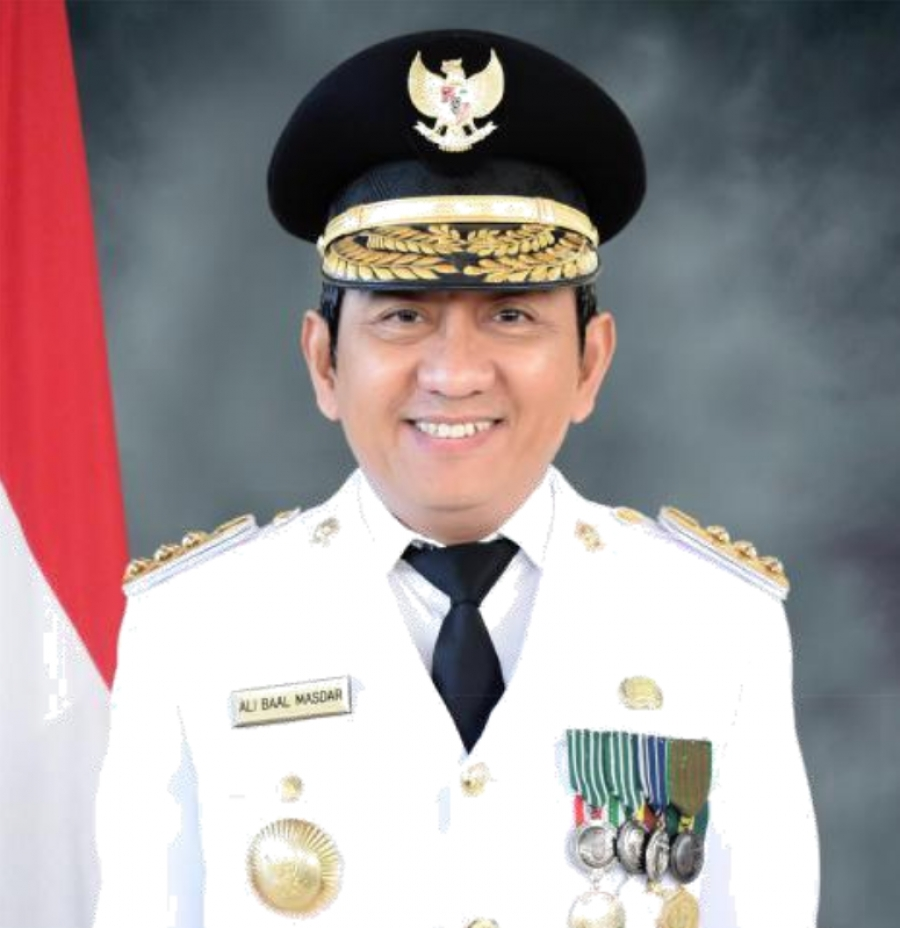
Candidate	Suhardi Duka	Andi Ibrahim Masdar
Party	Demokrat	PKB
Running mate	Salim S. Mengga	Asnuddin Sokong
Popular vote	337,512	144,154
Percentage	46.18%	19.72%
Candidate	Ali Baal Masdar	Husain Syam
Party	Gerindra	PDI-P
Alliance	KIM Plus	–
Running mate	Arwan Aras	Enny Anggraeny Anwar
Popular vote	137,181	111,980
Percentage	18.77%	15.32%
- Results by district
Governor before election
Bahtiar Baharuddin (acting)
Independent
Elected Governor
Suhardi Duka
Demokrat

The 2024 West Sulawesi gubernatorial election was held on 27 November 2024 as part of nationwide local elections to elect the governor and vice governor of West Sulawesi for a five-year term. The previous election was held in 2017. The election was won by Suhardi Duka of the Democratic Party with 46% of the vote. He defeated three other candidates, the runner up, former Polewali Mandar Regent Andi Ibrahim Masdar, received 19%. Former Governor Ali Baal Masdar placed third with 18%.

== Electoral system ==
The election, like other local elections in 2024, follow the first-past-the-post system where the candidate with the most votes wins the election, even if they do not win a majority. It is possible for a candidate to run uncontested, in which case the candidate is still required to win a majority of votes "against" an "empty box" option. Should the candidate fail to do so, the election will be repeated on a later date.

== Candidates ==
According to electoral regulations, in order to qualify for the election, candidates were required to secure support from a political party or a coalition of parties controlling 9 seats (20 percent of all seats) in the West Sulawesi Regional House of Representatives (DPRD). Golkar, with 10 of 45 seats, is the only party eligible to nominate a candidate without forming a coalition with other parties. Candidates may alternatively demonstrate support to run as an independent in form of photocopies of identity cards, which in West Sulawesi's case corresponds to 98,576 copies. No independent candidates registered prior to the deadline set by the General Elections Commission (KPU) on 12 May 2024.

=== Potential ===
The following are individuals who have either been publicly mentioned as a potential candidate by a political party in the DPRD, publicly declared their candidacy with press coverage, or considered as a potential candidate by media outlets:

- Ali Baal Masdar (Golkar), previous governor.
- Andi Ibrahim Masdar (PDI-P), former regent of Polewali Mandar.
- Husain Syam, academic and rector at Makassar State University.

== Political map ==
Following the 2024 Indonesian legislative election, ten political parties are represented in the West Sulawesi DPRD:

Political parties	Seat count
Party of Functional Groups (Golkar)	10 / 45
Democratic Party (Demokrat)	8 / 45
Indonesian Democratic Party of Struggle (PDI-P)	5 / 45
National Mandate Party (PAN)	5 / 45
Great Indonesia Movement Party (Gerindra)	5 / 45
NasDem Party	5 / 45
National Awakening Party (PKB)	3 / 45
People's Conscience Party (Hanura)	2 / 45
Prosperous Justice Party (PKS)	1 / 45
United Development Party (PPP)	1 / 45

== Results ==
Candidate	Running mate	Party	Votes	%
Suhardi Duka	Salim S. Mengga	Democratic Party	337,512	46.18
Andi Ibrahim Masdar	Asnuddin Sokong	National Awakening Party	144,154	19.72
Ali Baal Masdar	Arwan Aras	Gerindra Party	137,181	18.77
Husain Syam	Enny Anggraeny Anwar	Indonesian Democratic Party of Struggle	111,980	15.32
Total			730,827	100.00
Valid votes			730,827	96.35
Invalid/blank votes			27,699	3.65
Total votes			758,526	100.00
Registered voters/turnout			996,542	76.12
Source: KPU

Candidate vote share by district
Andi–Asnuddin

Ali–Arwan

Suhardi–Salim

Husain–Enny
