= 2025 Indonesian local elections =

- 2025

1 governor, 21 regents, and 4 mayors
Leadership before election
See #Races
Elected Leadership
See #Races

Twenty six local executive elections were held in Indonesia throughout 2025 as repeat elections following the 2024 local elections. The elections included one gubernatorial election for Papua, four mayoral elections, and 21 regency elections. Some of the repeat elections are only to be held in a limited number of polling stations (TPS) or districts.

== Background ==
The Constitutional Court of Indonesia received over 300 lawsuits in the aftermath of the 2024 Indonesian local elections, and in 24 cases, the court ordered a repeat election. Candidates of the elections remained the same as with 2024 in partial repeat elections. However, 9 candidates were disqualified for various reasons by the Constitutional Court, and will not be on the ballot in 2025.

Additionally, the Indonesian electoral law mandated the holding of repeat elections in the event a candidate running as a single candidate failed to secure more than half the valid votes against a "blank box" option. In 2024, two such elections occurred: in Pangkalpinang and in Bangka Regency, leading to repeat elections for the two regions scheduled for 27 August 2025.

== Elections ==
Region	Type	Election date	Registered voters	Turnout	Note
Magetan	Regency	22 March	2,118	1,878	4 TPS
North Barito	Regency	22 March	1,166	1,022	2 TPS
Siak	Regency	22 March	1,007	865	2 TPS
West Bangka	Regency	22 March	2,081	1,588	4 TPS
Sabang	Mayoral	5 April	541	TBD	1 TPS
Banggai	Regency	5 April	37,830	TBD	2 districts
Bungo	Regency	5 April	8,412	TBD	21 TPS
Buru	Regency	5 April	608	TBD	1 TPS
Taliabu Island	Regency	5 April	4,005	TBD	9 TPS
Talaud Islands	Regency	9 April	3,033	TBD	1 district
South Bengkulu	Regency	19 April	Full repeat election		
Banjarbaru	Mayoral	25 April (latest)	Full repeat election		
Empat Lawang	Regency	25 April (latest)	Full repeat election		
Kutai Kartanegara	Regency	25 April (latest)	Full repeat election		
North Gorontalo	Regency	25 April (latest)	Full repeat election		
Parigi Moutong	Regency	25 April (latest)	Full repeat election		
Pasaman	Regency	25 April (latest)	Full repeat election		
Serang	Regency	25 April (latest)	Full repeat election		
Tasikmalaya	Regency	25 April (latest)	Full repeat election		
Palopo	Mayoral	25 May (latest)	Full repeat election		
Mahakam Ulu	Regency	25 May (latest)	Full repeat election		
Pesawaran	Regency	25 May (latest)	Full repeat election		
Papua (details)	Gubernatorial	23 August (latest)	Full repeat election		
Boven Digoel	Regency	23 August (latest)	Full repeat election		
Pangkalpinang	Mayoral	27 August	Repeat due to blank box win		
Bangka	Regency	27 August	Repeat due to blank box win		
