= 2024 West Papua gubernatorial election =

- 27 November 2024
- Turnout: 79.37% (▼10.13pp)
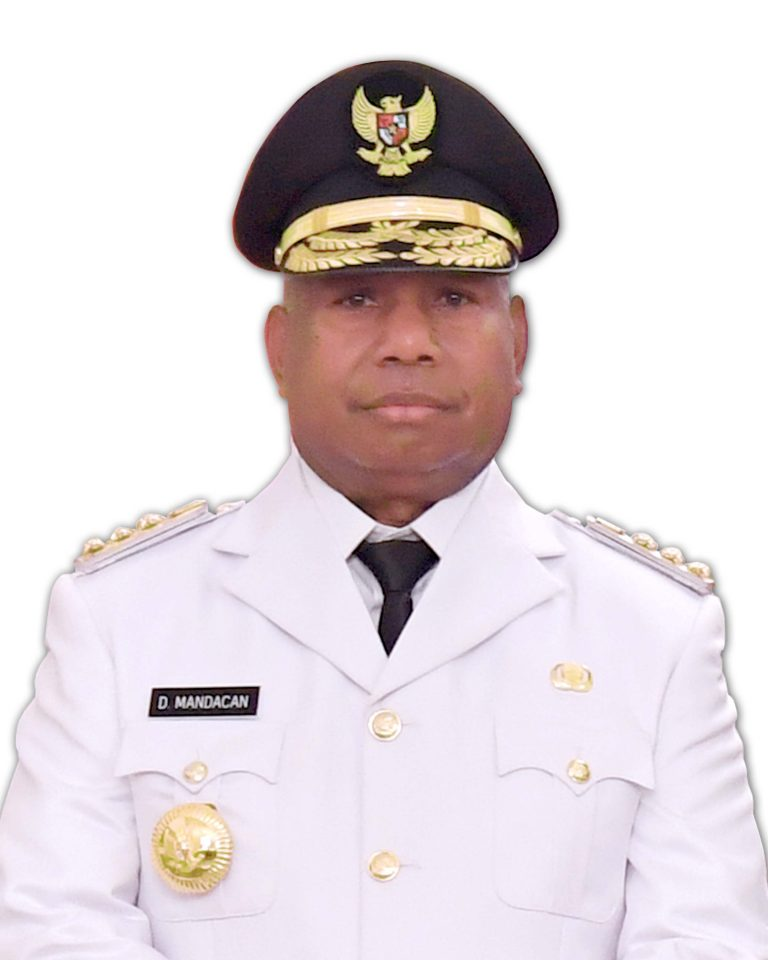

Candidate	Dominggus Mandacan	Blank box
Party	NasDem
Alliance	KIM Plus
Running mate	Mohamad Lakotani
Popular vote	269,245	20,643
Percentage	92.88%	7.12%
Governor before election
Ali Baham Temongmere (acting)
Independent
Elected Governor
Dominggus Mandacan
NasDem

The 2024 West Papua gubernatorial election was held on 27 November 2024 as part of nationwide local elections to elect the governor of West Papua province for a five-year term. The previous election was held in 2017. Former Governor Dominggus Mandacan was elected unopposed.

== Electoral system ==
The election, like other local elections in 2024, follow the first-past-the-post system where the candidate with the most votes wins the election, even if they do not win a majority. It is possible for a candidate to run uncontested, in which case the candidate is still required to win a majority of votes "against" an "empty box" option. Should the candidate fail to do so, the election will be repeated on a later date.

== Candidates ==
According to electoral regulations, in order to qualify for the election, candidates are required to secure support from a political party or a coalition of parties controlling 7 seats (20 percent of all seats) in the West Papua House of Representatives (DPRPB). Both Golkar and the Indonesian Democratic Party of Struggle (PDI-P) won 7 seats in the 2024 legislative election, and therefore the two parties are eligible to nominate a candidate without forming coalitions with other parties. Candidates may alternatively demonstrate support to run as an independent in form of photocopies of identity cards, but no independent candidates to run as governor prior to the deadline set by the General Elections Commission (KPU). Furthermore, due to Papuan special autonomy, both the gubernatorial and vice gubernatorial candidates are required to be Native Papuans.

=== Declared ===
Former Governor Dominggus Mandacan of NasDem was the only candidate to contest the West Papua governorship in this election. His running mate was former Vice Governor Mohamad Lakotani of Gerindra. Mandacan and Lakotani were nominated by a coalition of 17 parties. Although the KPU extended the registration deadline from 29 August to 4 September, no other individuals entered the gubernatorial race. Wahidin Puarada, a former regent of Fakfak, announced his intention to contest the election but ultimately did not run.

Candidate from NasDem and Gerindra
Dominggus Mandacan	Mohamad Lakotani
for Governor	for Vice Governor
Governor of West Papua (2017–2022)	Vice Governor of West Papua (2017–2022)

== Political map ==
Following the 2024 Indonesian legislative election, ten political parties are represented in the DPRPB:

Political parties	Seat count
Party of Functional Groups (Golkar)	7 / 35
Indonesian Democratic Party of Struggle (PDI-P)	7 / 35
NasDem Party	5 / 35
Great Indonesia Movement Party (Gerindra)	3 / 35
National Awakening Party (PKB)	3 / 35
National Mandate Party (PAN)	3 / 35
Democratic Party (Demokrat)	3 / 35
Perindo Party	2 / 35
Prosperous Justice Party (PKS)	1 / 35
United Development Party (PPP)	1 / 35

== Results ==
Candidate	Running mate	Party	Votes	%
Dominggus Mandacan	Mohamad Lakotani	NasDem Party	269,245	92.88
Blank box			20,643	7.12
Total			289,888	100.00
Valid votes			289,888	97.00
Invalid/blank votes			8,970	3.00
Total votes			298,858	100.00
Registered voters/turnout			376,548	79.37
Source: KPU
