= 2024 Bengkayang regency election =

2024 Bengkayang regental election
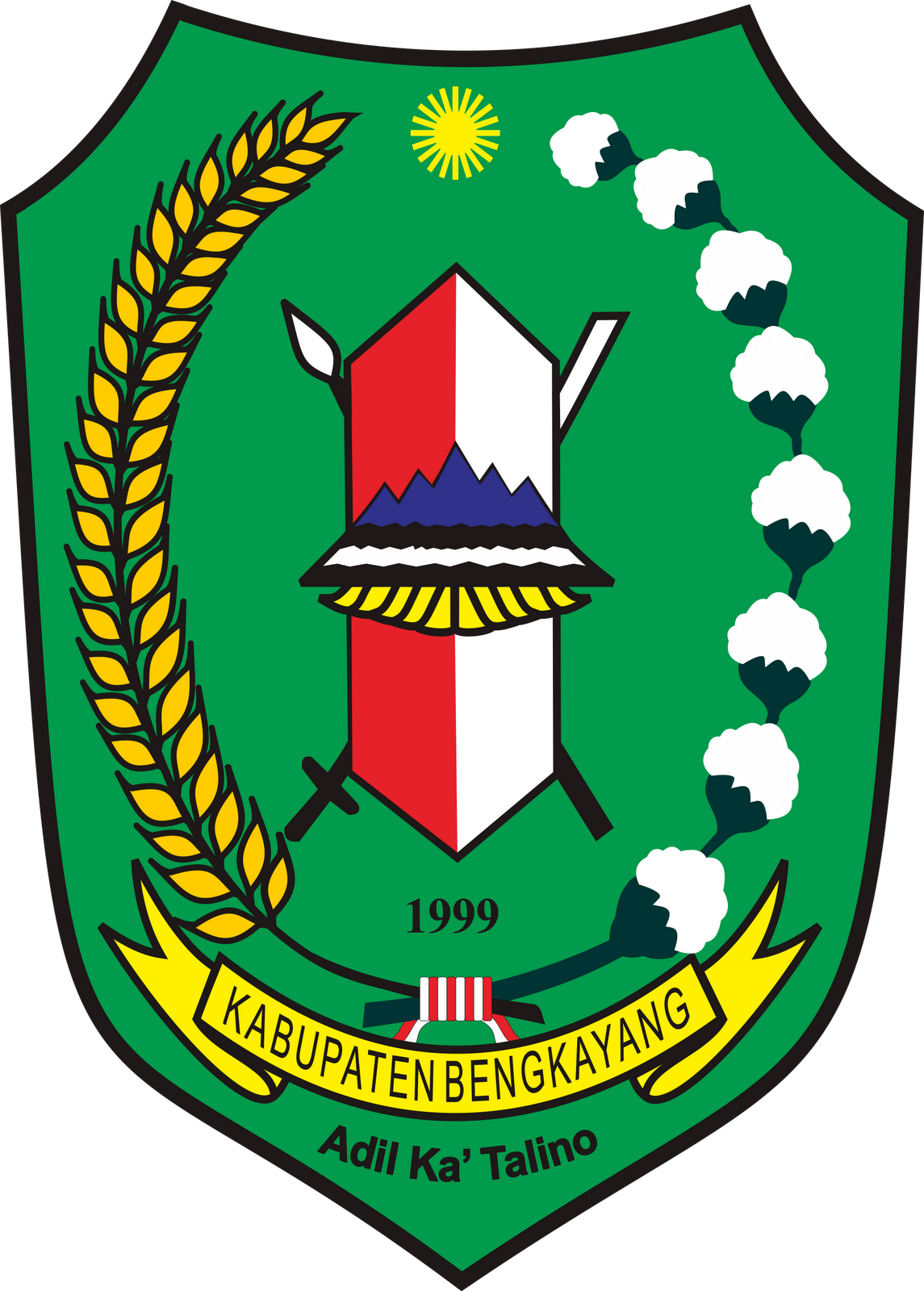
- 27 November 2024
- Registered: 206,308
- Turnout: 113,759 (55.14%)
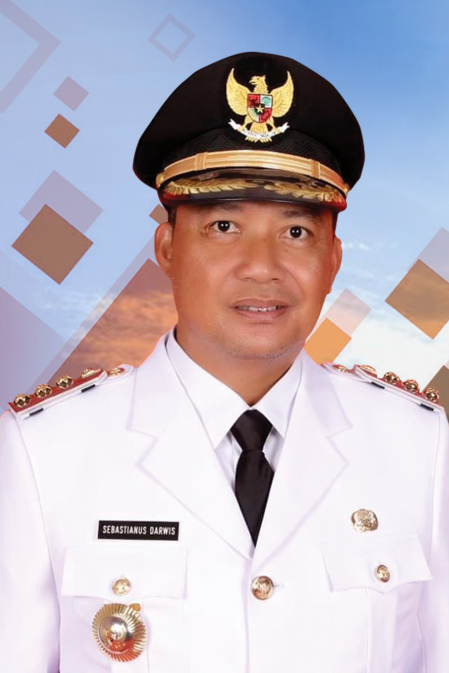

Candidate	Sebastianus Darwis	Blank box
Party	Gerindra
Running mate	Syamsul Rizal
Popular vote	77,766	31,611
Percentage	71.10%	28.90%
Regent before election
Sebastianus Darwis
Gerindra
Elected Regent
Sebastianus Darwis
Gerindra

The 2024 Bengkayang regental election was held on 27 November 2024 as part of nationwide local elections to elect the regent of Bengkayang Regency in West Kalimantan for a five-year term. The previous election was held in 2020. Incumbent regent Sebastianus Darwis ran in an uncontested election and won 71.10 percent of the votes against the blank box option.

== Electoral system ==
The election, like other local elections in 2024, follow the first-past-the-post system where the candidate with the most votes wins the election, even if they do not win a majority. It is possible for a candidate to run uncontested, in which case the candidate is still required to win a majority of votes "against" an "empty box" option. Should the candidate fail to do so, the election will be repeated on a later date.

== Candidates ==
According to electoral regulations, candidates were required to secure support from a political party or a coalition which had gained at least 10% of valid votes in the 2024 Bengkayang Regency Regional House of Representatives election. Therefore Gerindra (17.89%), Golkar (16.86%), PDI-P (16.56%), Demokrat (12.01%), and NasDem (11.78%) were eligible to nominate a candidate without forming coalitions with other political parties. Candidates may alternatively demonstrate support to run as an independent in form of photocopies of identity cards, which in Bengkayang's case corresponds to 20,653 copies. No independent candidates registered with the General Elections Commission (KPU) prior to the deadline on 12 May 2024.

== Results ==
Candidate	Running mate	Party	Votes	%
Sebastianus Darwis	Syamsul Rizal	Gerindra	77,766	71.10
Blank	box		31,611	28.90
Total			109,377	100.00
Valid votes			109,377	96.15
Invalid votes			4,382	3.85
Total votes			113,759	100.00
Registered voters/turnout			206,308	55.14
Source: Bengkayang Regency General Elections Commission
