= 2024 Kuningan regency election =

Local election in Indonesia

- 27 November 2024
- Registered: 891,960
- Turnout: 65.61%
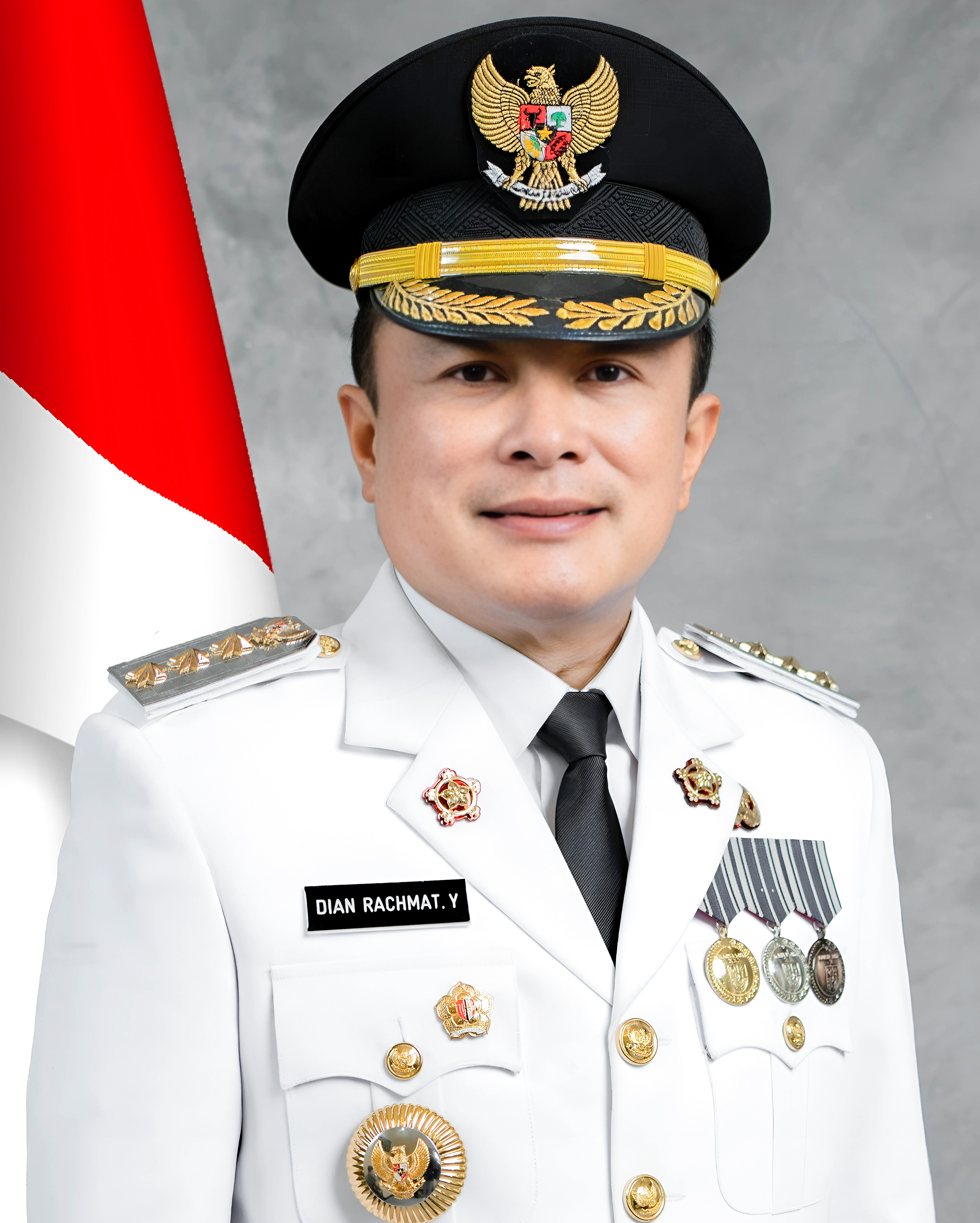

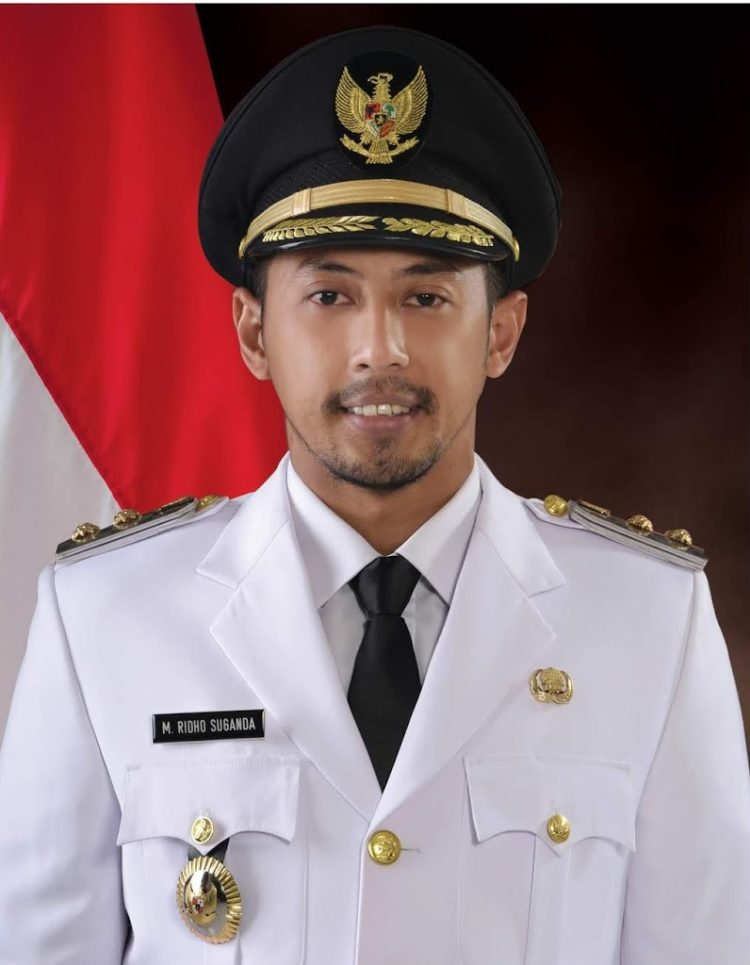

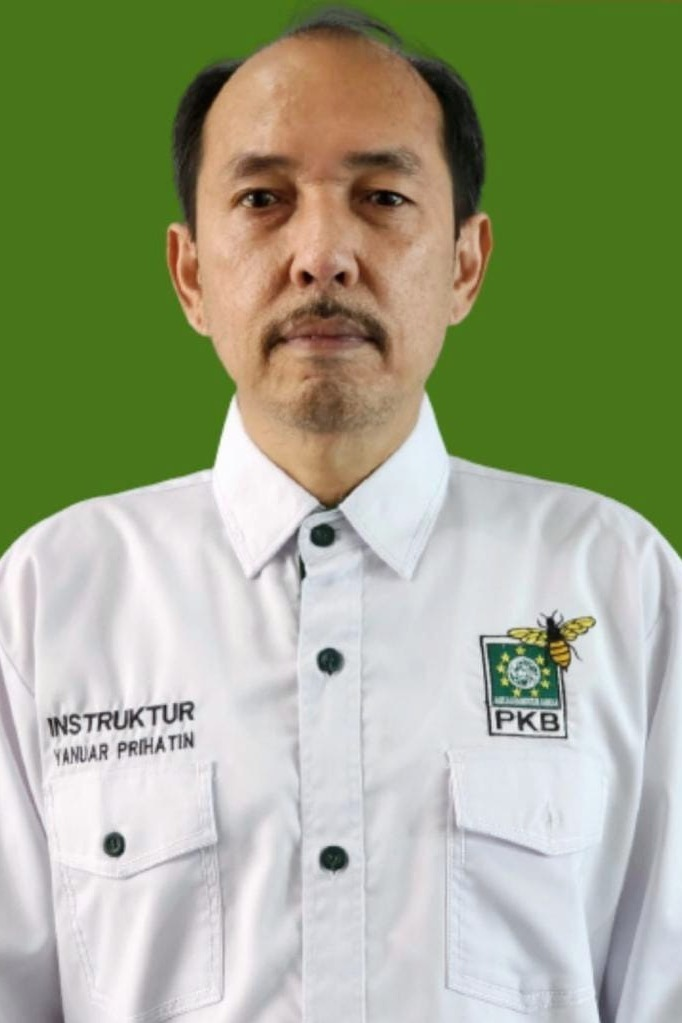
Candidate	Dian Rachmat Yanuar	Ridho Suganda	Yanuar Prihatin
Party	Golkar	PDI-P	PKB
Running mate	Tuti Andriani	Kamdan	Udin Kusnaedi
Popular vote	211,961	196,853	145,474
Percentage	38.24%	35.51%	26.25%
- Results map by district and subdistrict (Interactive version)
Regent before election
Acep Purnama
PDI-P
Elected Regent
Dian Rachmat Yanuar
Golkar

The 2024 Kuningan regency election was held on 27 November 2024 as part of nationwide local elections to elect the regent of Kuningan Regency for a five-year term. The previous election was held in 2020.

== Electoral system ==
The election, like other local elections in 2024, follow the first-past-the-post system where the candidate with the most votes wins the election, even if they do not win a majority. It is possible for a candidate to run uncontested, in which case the candidate is still required to win a majority of votes "against" an "empty box" option. Should the candidate fail to do so, the election will be repeated on a later date.

== Candidates ==
According to electoral regulations, in order to qualify for the election, candidates are required to secure support from a political party or a coalition of parties controlling 10 seats in the Kuningan Regional House of Representatives (DPRD). As no parties won 10 or more seats in the 2024 legislative election, all parties must form coalitions in order to nominate a candidate in the election. Candidates may alternatively demonstrate support in form of photocopies of identity cards, which in Kuningan's case corresponds to 67,129 copies. No such candidates registered or expressed interest prior to the deadline set by the General Elections Commission (KPU).

=== Potential ===
The following are individuals who have either been publicly mentioned as a potential candidate by a political party in the DPRD, publicly declared their candidacy with press coverage, or considered as a potential candidate by media outlets:

- Ridho Suganda (PDI-P), previous vice regent.
- Dian Rachmat Yanuar, secretary of Kuningan Regency.
- Yanuar Prihatin, Member of DPR-RI.

== Political map ==
Following the 2024 Indonesian legislative election, eight political parties are represented in the Kuningan DPRD:

Political parties	Seat count
Indonesian Democratic Party of Struggle (PDI-P)	9 / 50
National Awakening Party (PKB)	8 / 50
Prosperous Justice Party (PKS)	7 / 50
Party of Functional Groups (Golkar)	7 / 50
Great Indonesia Movement Party (Gerindra)	6 / 50
United Development Party (PPP)	4 / 50
NasDem Party	3 / 50
Democratic Party (Demokrat)	3 / 50
National Mandate Party (PAN)	3 / 50
