= 2024 Cirebon mayoral election =

- 27 November 2024
- Registered: 255,779
- Turnout: 66.18%
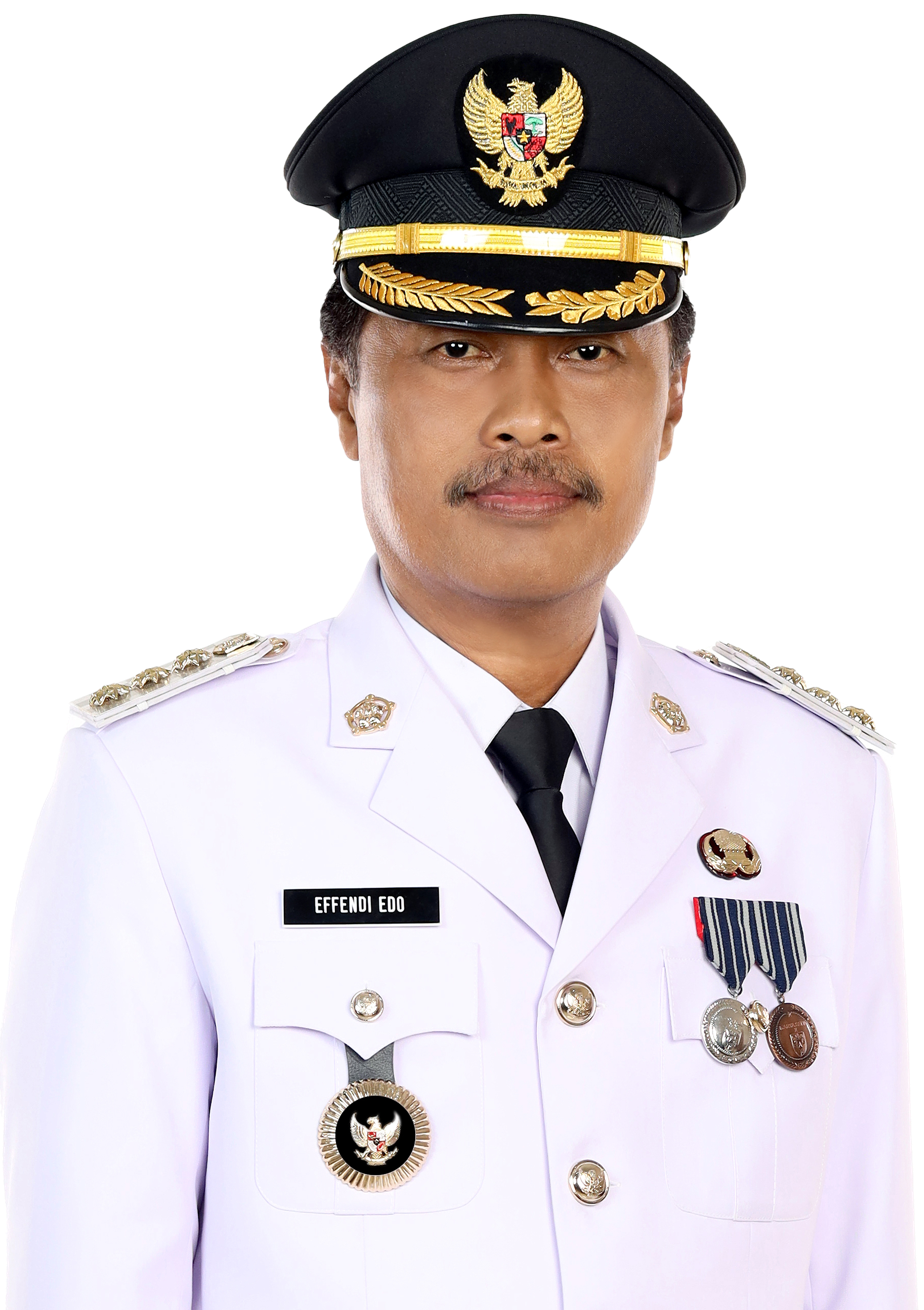

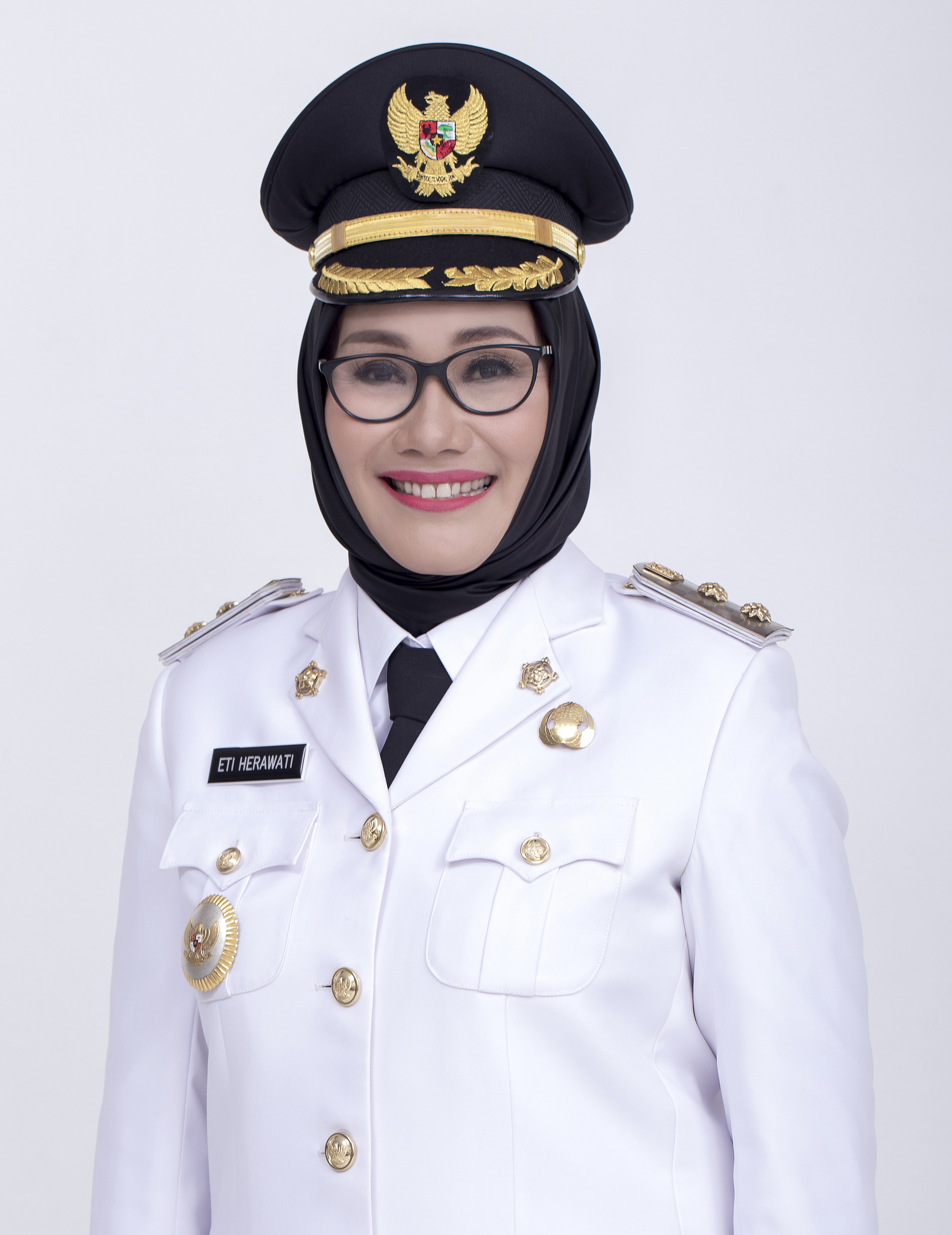

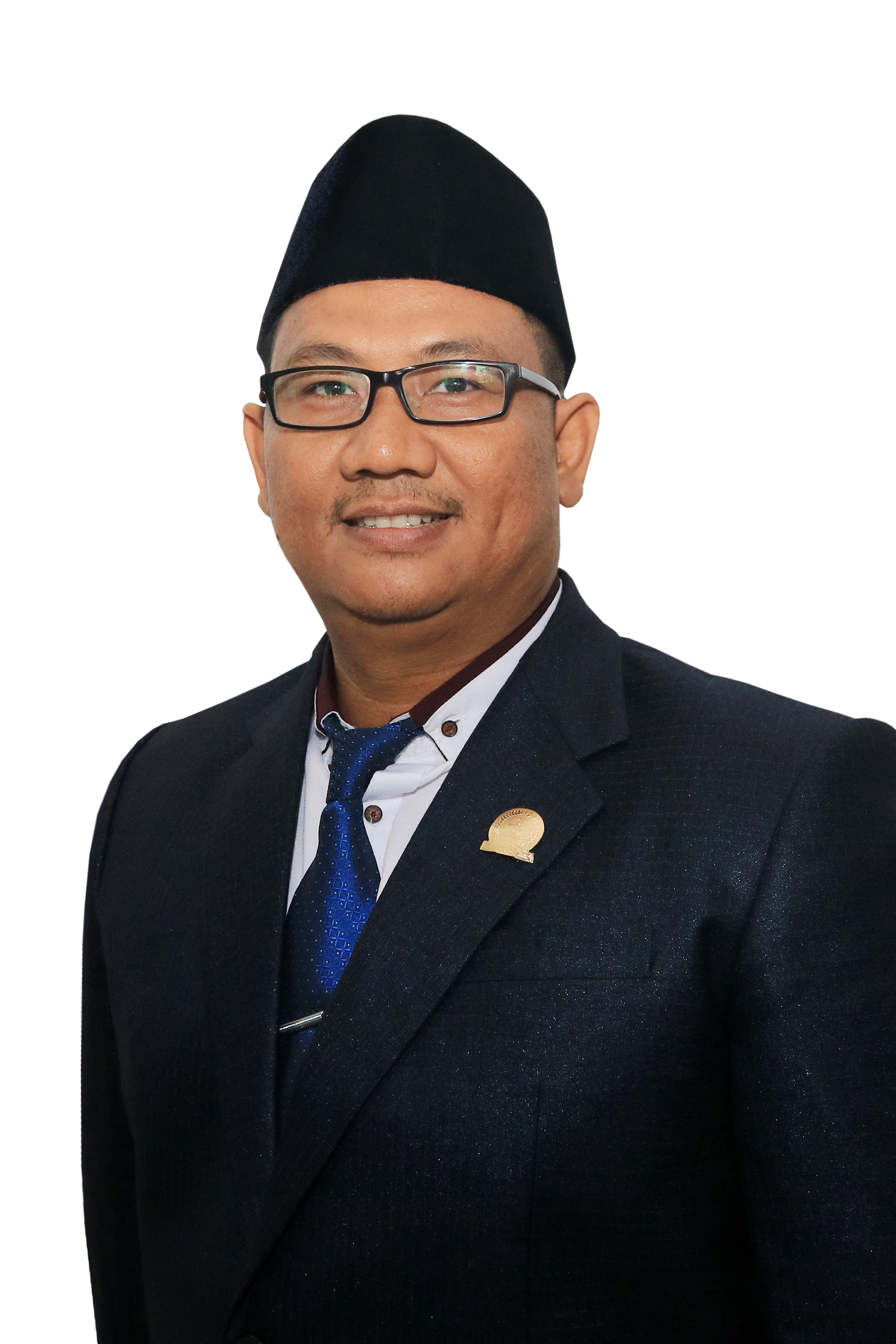
Candidate	Effendi Edo	Eti Herawati	Dani Mardani
Party	Golkar	NasDem	PAN
Running mate	Siti Farida	Suhendrik	Fitria Pamungkaswati
Popular vote	77,755	47,462	29,303
Percentage	50.32%	30.72%	18.96%
- Results map by district and subdistrict (Interactive version)
Mayor before election
Agus Mulyadi (acting)
Independent
Elected mayor
Effendi Edo
Golkar

The 2024 Cirebon mayoral election was held on 27 November 2024 as part of nationwide local elections to elect the mayor and vice mayor of Cirebon, West Java for a five-year term. The previous election was held in 2017. Golkar's Effendi Edo won the election, receiving 50% of the vote. Former Mayor Eti Herawati of the NasDem Party placed second with 30%, followed by Dani Mardani of the National Mandate Party (PAN), who received 18%.

== Electoral system ==
The election, like other local elections in 2024, follow the first-past-the-post system where the candidate with the most votes wins the election, even if they do not win a majority. It is possible for a candidate to run uncontested, in which case the candidate is still required to win a majority of votes "against" an "empty box" option. Should the candidate fail to do so, the election will be repeated on a later date.

== Candidates ==
According to electoral regulations, in order to qualify for the election, candidates were required to secure support from a political party or a coalition of parties controlling 7 seats (20 percent of all seats) in the Cirebon Regional House of Representatives (DPRD). As no parties won 10 or more seats in the 2024 legislative election, all parties must form coalitions in order to nominate a candidate in the election. Candidates may alternatively demonstrate support to run as an independent in form of photocopies of identity cards, which in Cirebon's case corresponds to 21,534 copies. No one independent candidate registered with the General Elections Commission (KPU).

=== Potential ===
The following are individuals who have either been publicly mentioned as a potential candidate by a political party in the DPRD, publicly declared their candidacy with press coverage, or considered as a potential candidate by media outlets:

- Eti Herawati, previous mayor and vice mayor.
- Effendi Edo (Golkar), candidate for vice mayor in 2018
- Fitria Pamungkaswati, deputy speaker of Cirebon Regional People's Representative Council.

== Political map ==
Following the 2024 Indonesian legislative election, nine political parties are represented in the Cirebon DPRD:

Political parties	Seat count
NasDem Party	6 / 35
Party of Functional Groups (Golkar)	6 / 35
Great Indonesia Movement Party (Gerindra)	5 / 35
Prosperous Justice Party (PKS)	4 / 35
Indonesian Democratic Party of Struggle (PDI-P)	4 / 35
National Mandate Party (PAN)	3 / 35
National Awakening Party (PKB)	3 / 35
Democratic Party (Demokrat)	2 / 35
United Development Party (PPP)	1 / 35
People's Conscience Party (Hanura)	1 / 35

== Results ==
Candidate	Running mate	Party	Votes	%
Effendi Edo	Siti Farida Rosmawati	Golkar	77,755	50.32
Eti Herawati	Suhendrik	NasDem Party	47,462	30.72
Dani Mardani	Fitria Pamungkaswati	National Mandate Party	29,303	18.96
Total			154,520	100.00
Valid votes			154,520	91.28
Invalid/blank votes			14,756	8.72
Total votes			169,276	100.00
Registered voters/turnout			255,779	66.18
Source: KPU
