= 2024 Singkawang mayoral election =

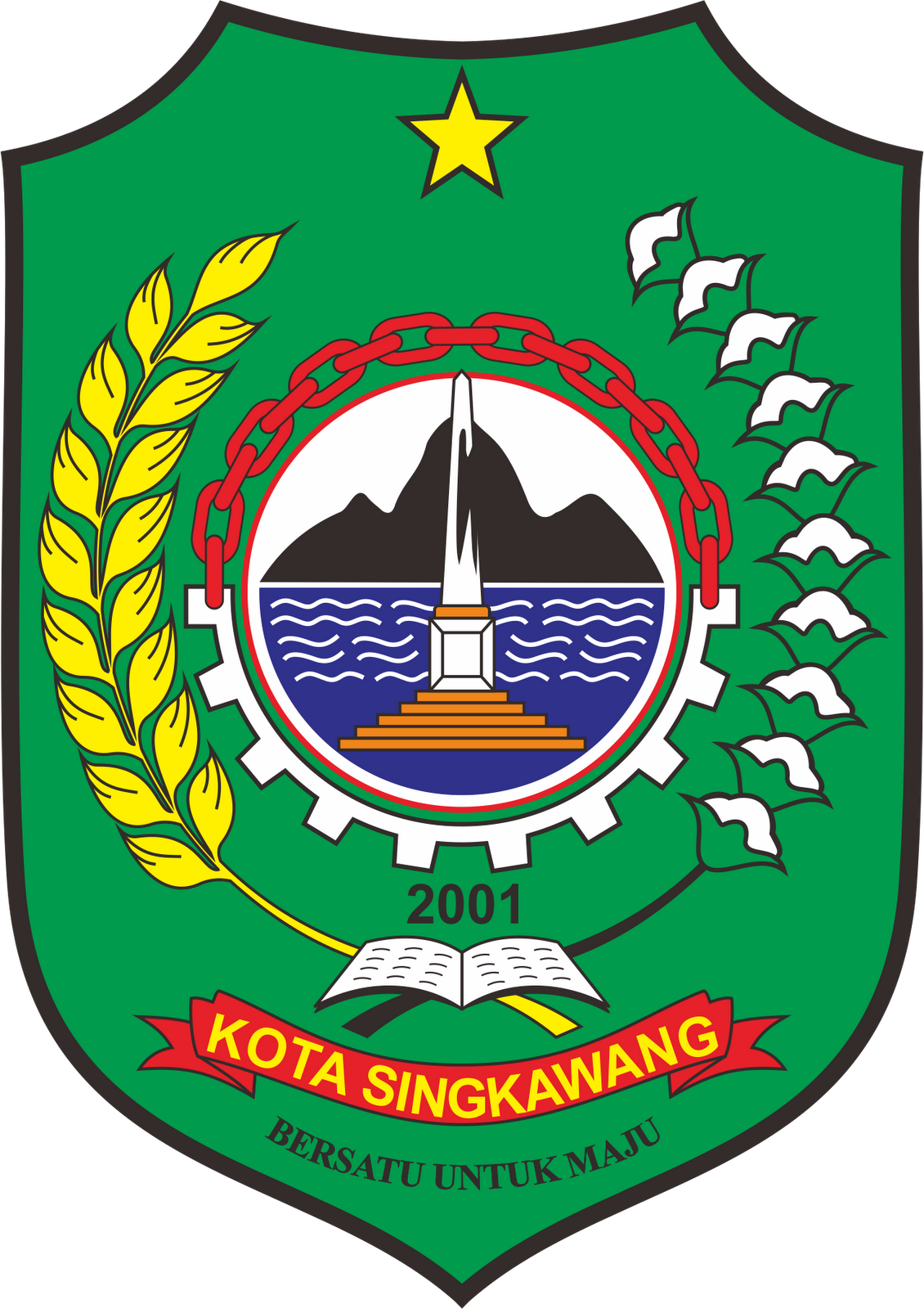
- 27 November 2024
- Registered: 172,118
- Turnout: 98,746 (57.37%)
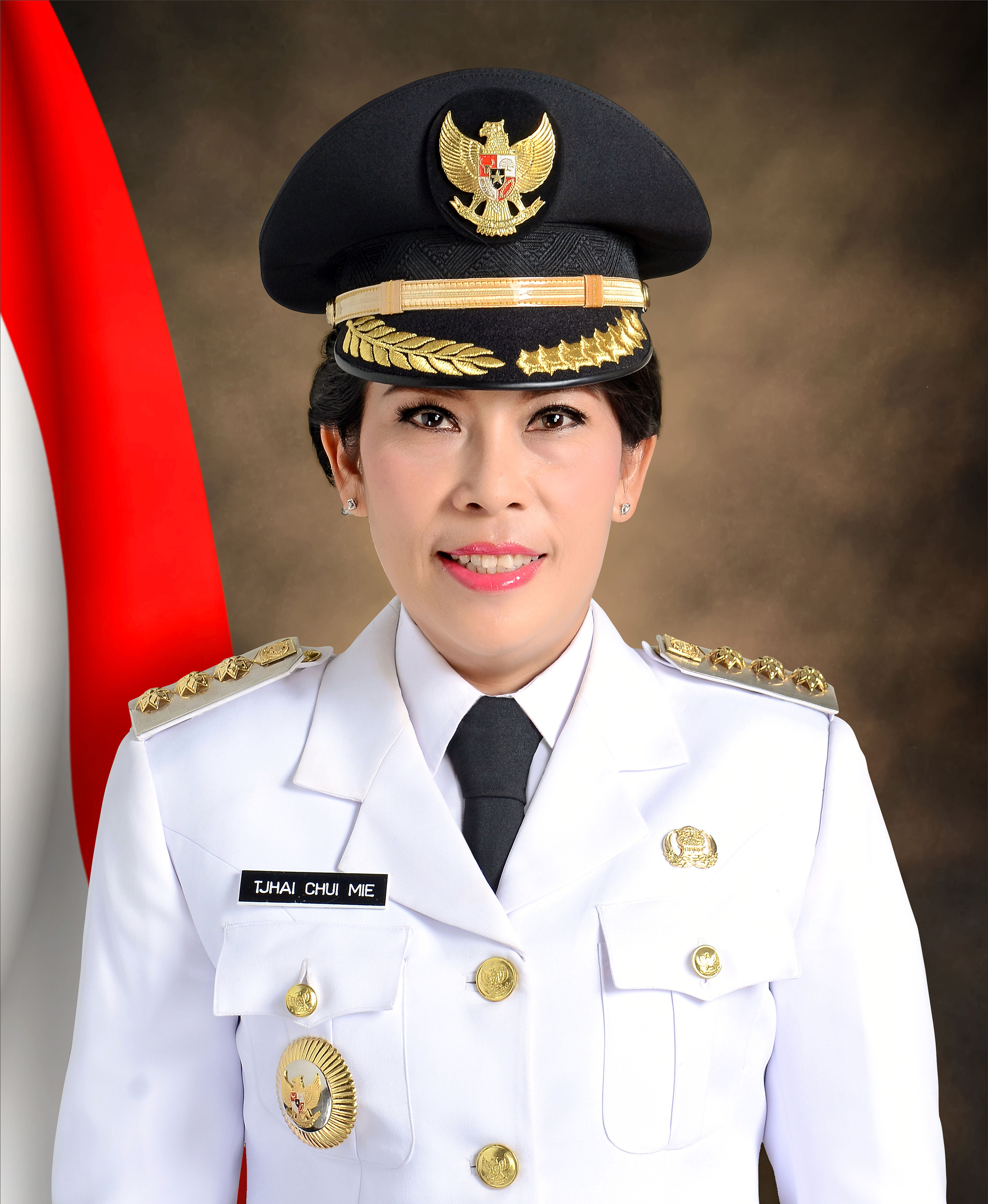

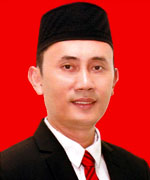

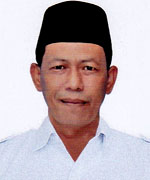
Nominee	Tjhai Chui Mie	Andi Syarif	Abdul Mutalib
Party	PDI-P	Golkar	PKB
Running mate	Muhammadin	Yusnita Fitriadi	Irwan
Popular vote	52,253	23,484	20,101
Percentage	54.52%	24.50%	20.97%
Mayor before election
Sumastro (acting)
Independent
Elected mayor
Tjhai Chui Mie
PDI-P

The 2024 Singkawang mayoral election was held on 27 November 2024 as part of nationwide local elections to elect the mayor of Singkawang for a five-year term. Previous mayor Tjhai Chui Mie managed to secure a second term in a three-way race.

== Electoral system ==
The election, like other local elections in 2024, follow the first-past-the-post system where the candidate with the most votes wins the election, even if they do not win a majority. It is possible for a candidate to run uncontested, in which case the candidate is still required to win a majority of votes "against" an "empty box" option. Should the candidate fail to do so, the election will be repeated on a later date.

== Candidates ==
According to electoral regulations, candidates were required to secure support from a political party or a coalition which had gained at least 10% of valid votes in the 2024 Singkawang City Regional House of Representatives election. Therefore PDI-P (15.73%), PKB (14.12%), PAN (11.89%), and NasDem (11.14%) were eligible to nominate a candidate without forming coalitions with other political parties. Independent candidates were required to demonstrate support in form of photocopies of identity cards, which in Singkawang's case corresponds to 16,996. No independent candidate registered with the General Elections Commission by the deadline on 12 May 2024.

== Results ==
Party
Total

Source: General Elections Commission
