= Verna Inkiriwang =

Indonesian politician (born 1983)

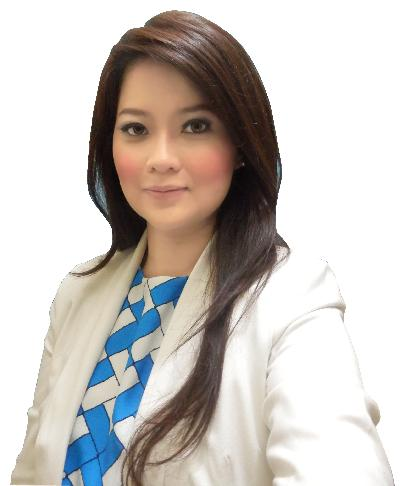
- Inkiriwang in 2014

Regent of Poso
- Incumbent
- Assumed office 26 February 2021
- Preceded by: Iskandar Usman Al-Farlaky

Personal details
- Born: 27 November 1983 (age 42)
- Party: Democratic Party
- Parents: Piet Inkiriwang (father); Ellen Esther Pelealu (mother)

Verna Gladies Merry Inkiriwang (born 27 November 1983) is an Indonesian politician serving as regent of Poso since 2021. From 2009 to 2019, she was a member of the House of Representatives.
