= Ahmad Muhdlor Ali =

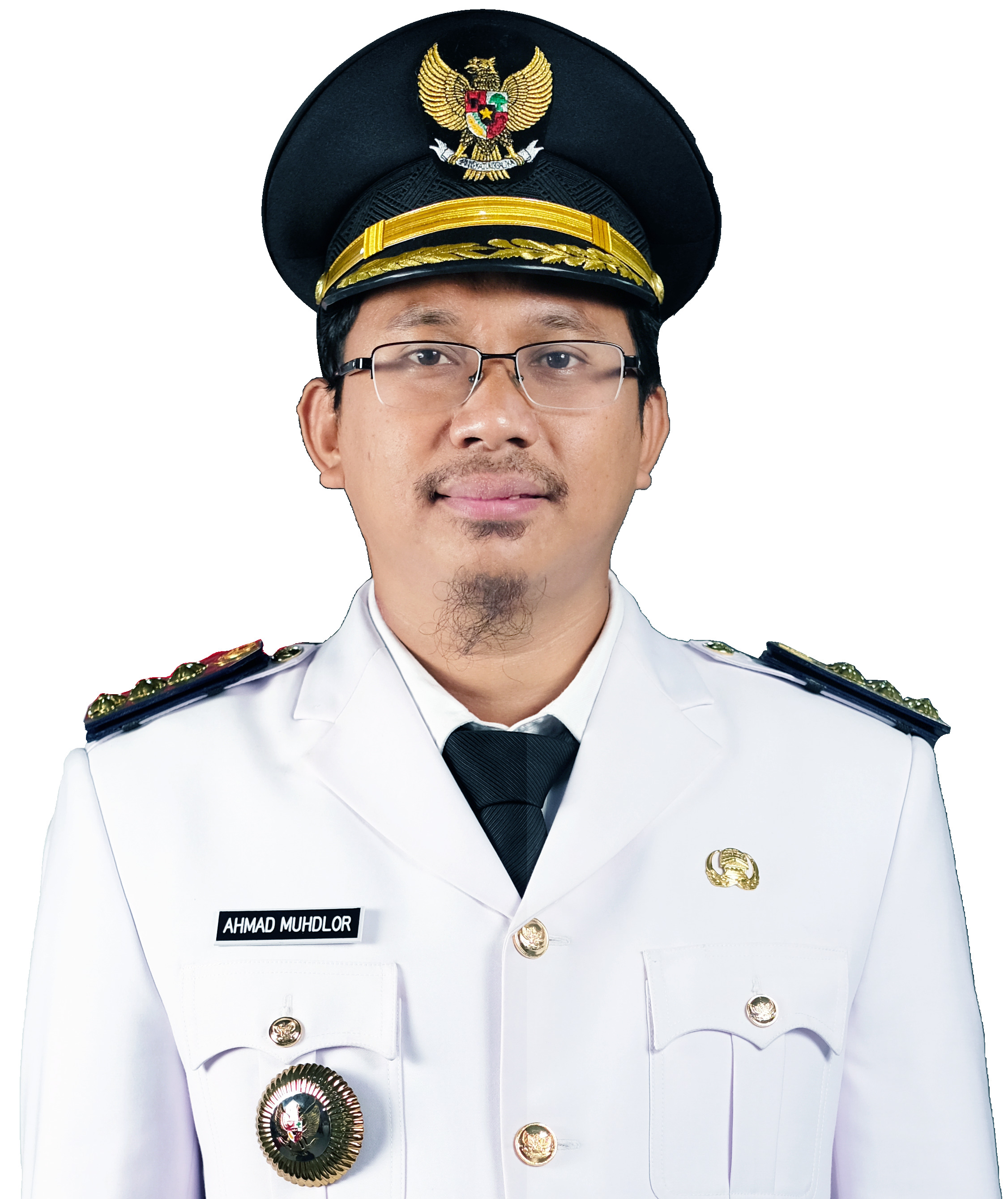

Regent of Sidoarjo
- In office 26 February 2021 – 7 May 2024
- Preceded by: Saiful Ilah
- Succeeded by: Subandi (act.)

Personal details
- Born: 11 February 1991 (age 34); Sidoarjo, East Java, Indonesia
- Political party: PKB (until 2024)

Ahmad Muhdlor Ali (born 11 February 1991), popularly known as Gus Muhdlor, is an Indonesian politician formerly of the National Awakening Party who served as the regent of Sidoarjo Regency, East Java from 2021 to 2024. He was arrested by the Corruption Eradication Commission in May 2024 under suspicion of corruption.

== Early life ==
Ahmad Muhdlor Ali was born on 11 February 1991 in Sidoarjo Regency as the sixth child of Nahdlatul Ulama figure Agoes Ali Masyhuri. He completed elementary school in Sidoarjo, completed middle school in Kediri, and then returned to Sidoarjo where he graduated from high school. Muhdlor then enrolled at Airlangga University in nearby Surabaya. He graduated with a bachelor's in 2013.

== Career ==
Muhdlor became a member of the Nahdlatul Ulama-affiliated GP Ansor organization, by 2020 becoming vice chairman of the organization in East Java. He ran as the National Awakening Party (PKB)'s regent candidate of Sidoarjo in the 2020 regency election, and narrowly won the three-candidate race with 387,766 votes (38.8%) to the second place's 373,516 votes (37.8%). Ali was sworn in as regent on 26 February 2021.

As regent, Muhdlor announced a 17-point program for Sidoarjo, which included a job creation program as part of recovery from the COVID-19 pandemic and grants to female owned businesses. The program also included incentives for religious teachers. In 2024, Muhdlor was expelled from the National Awakening Party due to his support of Prabowo Subianto in the 2024 Indonesian presidential election.

=== Corruption case ===
On 7 May 2024, he was officially arrested by the Corruption Eradication Commission under suspicion of siphoning regency taxes. He was the third consecutive regent of Sidoarjo to be arrested by KPK on corruption charges.
