= Marwan Hamami =

Indonesian politician (born 1963)

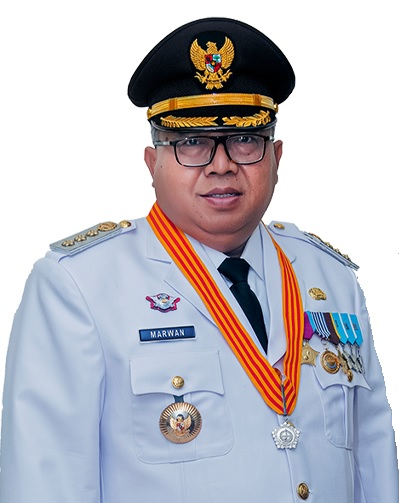
- Official portrait

Regent of Sukabumi
- In office 17 February 2016 – 20 February 2025
- Preceded by: Sukmawijaya
- Succeeded by: Asep Japar

Vice Regent of Sukabumi
- In office 29 August 2005 – 29 August 2010
- Regent: Sukmawijaya

Personal details
- Born: 22 May 1963 (age 62); Sukabumi, West Java, Indonesia
- Political party: Golkar

Marwan Hamami (born 22 May 1963) is an Indonesian politician of the Golkar party who served as the regent of Sukabumi Regency, West Java from 2016 to 2025. He was previously vice regent of Sukabumi between 2005 and 2010.

== Early life and education ==
Marwan Hamami was born on 22 May 1963 in Sukabumi Regency, and studied within Sukabumi until he graduated from high school. In 1986, he graduated from Parahyangan Catholic University in Bandung, and he would later receive a master's degree from an economic institute in Bandung.

== Career ==
After completing his studies, he began to work as operational manager at PT Kujang Mas, a Sukabumi-based distribution company, eventually becoming its president director.

In 2005, he ran in Sukabumi's first regency election as the running mate to Sukmawijaya, and the pair was elected after winning 412,961 votes (42.5%). They served between 29 August 2005 and 29 August 2010. In 2010, Hamami ran as a regent candidate against Sukmawijaya, but placed second in the election after winning 195,450 votes (19.9%) to Sukmawijaya's 379,344 (38.7%).

Hamami ran again as regent in the 2015 regency election, with 500,889 votes (50.5%) in a three-way race. They were sworn in on 17 February 2016. In the 2020 regency election, he was reelected with 479,621 votes (45.6%). As regent, Hamami's programs included the expansion of the puskesmas free healthcare service in the regency and the provision of scholarships to Islamic school students.

He is a Golkar party member, and served as chair of the party's Sukabumi Regency branch.

== Family ==
Hamami has a brother and a sister. His brother Andri Setiawan Hamami was elected as the mayor of Sukabumi City in the 2018 mayoral election. Their mother, Ais Suaedah, died in 2023.
