= Ali Baal Masdar =

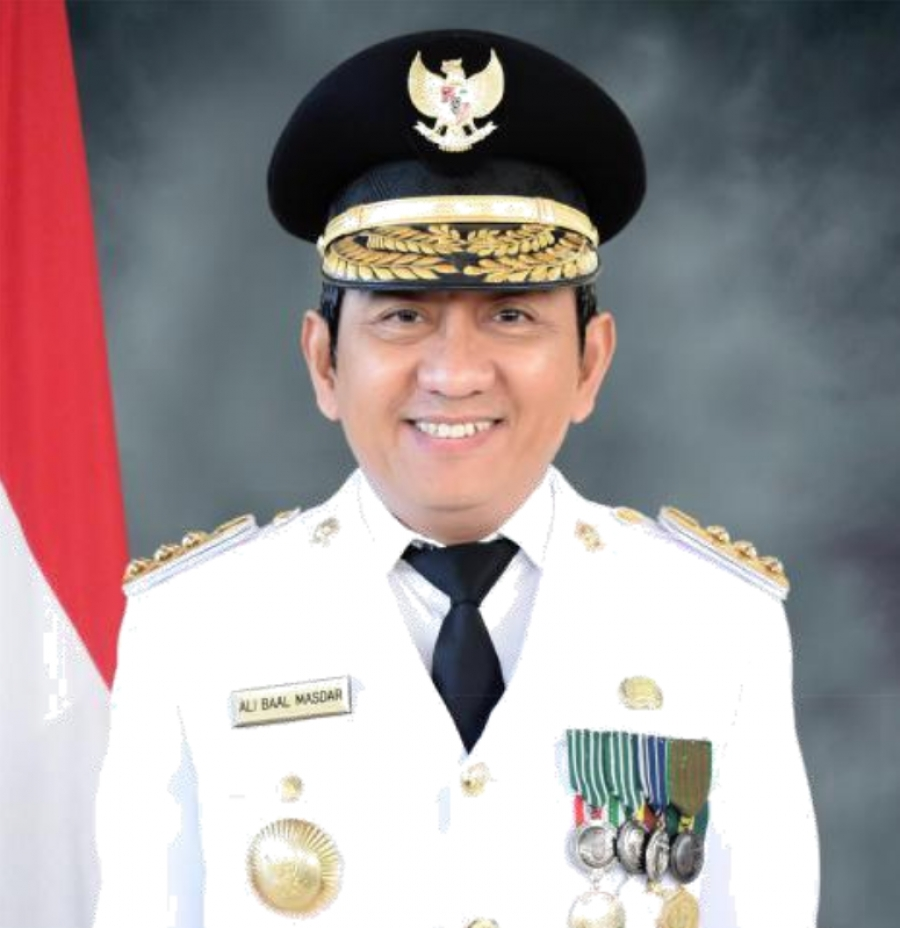

Governor of West Sulawesi
- In office 12 May 2017 – 12 May 2022
- President: Joko Widodo
- Deputy: Enny Anggraeni Anwar
- Preceded by: Carlo Brix Tewu (acting)
- Succeeded by: Akmal Malik (act.); Zudan Arif Fakrulloh (act.); Bahtiar Baharuddin (act.); Suhardi Duka

7th regent of Polewali Mandar
- In office 2004–2014
- Governor: Oentarto Sindung Mawardi (act.); Syamsul Arief Rivai (act.); Anwar Adnan Saleh
- Deputy: M. Yusuf Tuali (2004–2008); Nadjamuddin Ibrahim (2009–2014)
- Preceded by: Hasyim Manggabarani
- Succeeded by: Andi Ibrahim Masdar

Personal details
- Born: Ali Baal; 29 May 1960 (age 66) Makassar, South and Southeast Sulawesi, Indonesia
- Citizenship: Indonesian
- Party: Golkar (since 2019)
- Other political affiliations: Gerindra (until 2019)
- Spouse: Andi Ruskati Radjab
- Relations: Andi Ibrahim Masdar (brother)
- Children: 2
- Parents: Andi Masdar Pasmar (father); Andi Suryani Pasilong (mother)
- Education: STIA LAN-RI Ujung Pandang; Hasanuddin University
- Occupation: Politician

Ali Baal Masdar is an Indonesian politician. He is the former governor of West Sulawesi province from 2017 to 2022, and the regent of Polewali Mandar Regency.

Masdar's election experienced several problems. Thousands of ballots were damaged in the weeks leading up to the election, necessitating their reprinting. Weather conditions raised concerns about the polls being inaccessible, and constituencies in mountainous areas presented transportation challenges for ballot delivery. Due to fears of civil unrest during the public counting of ballots, the province dispatched several hundred police officers to the polls, though quick counts had already demonstrated Masdar's victory by then.
