= Rudy Gunawan (politician) =

Indonesian politician and lawyer (born 1964)

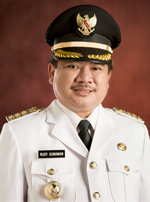

Regent of Garut
- In office 23 January 2014 – 23 January 2024
- Governor: Ahmad Heryawan; Ridwan Kamil
- Deputy: Helmi Budiman
- Preceded by: Agus Hamdani
- Succeeded by: Barnas Adjidin (acting)

Personal details
- Born: 4 August 1964 (age 60); Garut, West Java, Indonesia
- Political party: Gerindra

Rudy Gunawan (born 4 August 1964) is an Indonesian politician and lawyer who served as the regent of Garut Regency, West Java from 2014 to 2024.

== Early life and education ==
Rudy Gunawan was born on 4 August 1964 in Garut, West Java, and grew up there before moving to Bandung for his high school studies. He then studied law at Padjadjaran University.

== Career ==
After graduating, Gunawan became a lawyer. He established his own practice, Gunawan & Associates Law Firm, in 1985. The firm consulted the West Java Regional People's Representative Council and the province's government between 1999 and 2009. He also was appointed commissioner in several companies, and had run in Garut's 2008 regency election although he lost.

Joining Gerindra, Gunawan ran for a second time in the 2013 regency election with Prosperous Justice Party cadre Helmi Budiman as running mate, winning with 524,164 votes (50.31%). He was sworn in on 23 January 2014. Gunawan and Budiman were reelected in the 2018 election, winning 428,113 votes (35.8%).

In 2018, he established a special team to track the creator of a homosexual group on social media (which had 2,500 members), and asked for support from the local military district. During a teacher's strike that same year, he threatened to remove principals who paused teaching activities. He also prohibited festivities on the New Year's Eve of that year, citing the mourning due the natural disasters occurring across the country and requested that money meant for festivities be donated to the victims.
