= Lukas Mbadi Kaborang =

Indonesian politician (1938–2026)

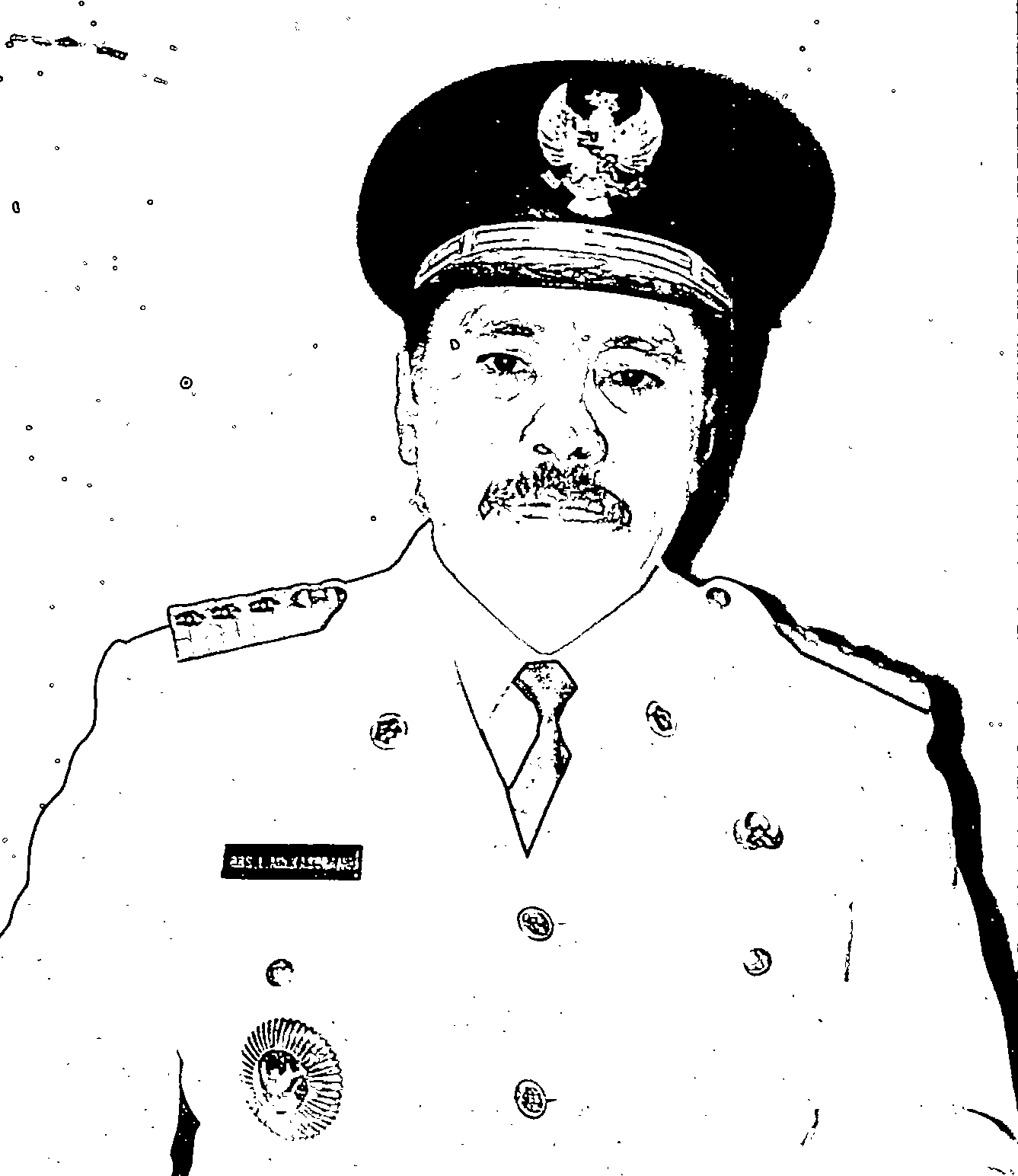
- Kaborang as regent

Regent of East Sumba
- In office 20 June 1994 – 5 August 1999
- Preceded by: T. P. Munthe
- Succeeded by: Umbu Mehang Kunda

Personal details
- Born: 21 May 1943 East Sumba, Japan-occupied Dutch East Indies
- Died: 20 April 2026 (aged 82) Kupang, East Nusa Tenggara, Indonesia

Lukas Mbadi Kaborang (21 May 1943 – 20 April 2026) was an Indonesian politician and civil servant. He was the regent of East Sumba, East Nusa Tenggara for one term between 1994 and 1999, and also served in East Sumba's Regional House of Representatives. He unsuccessfully contested elections in 2000 and 2005 for a second term. Prior to entering politics, he worked as a civil servant in East Nusa Tenggara's provincial government for over 30 years.

== Early life ==
Lukas Mbadi Kaborang was born on 21 May 1943 in Karera, in East Sumba. His father died in Kaborang's youth and he grew up in poverty. He moved to Sumbawa to enroll at an elementary school, before returning to Sumba's Waingapu to study at a middle school. He would later continue his studies in Surabaya and in the provincial capital of Kupang where he obtained a degree from the Nusa Cendana University in 1983.

== Career ==
After he completed middle school in 1960, he secured a civil service job at the provincial governor's office in Kupang. As he worked his way through the ranks, he took part in politics, joining the Indonesian Christian Party (Parkindo) before leaving it in 1971. Instead, he joined Golkar (like other civil servants during the New Order).

In 1993, he began making his bid to become regent of East Sumba. His primary competitor was Umbu Mehang Kunda, a member of the national House of Representatives. Despite Kunda securing the endorsements of the provincial governor and military commander, Kaborang unexpectedly defeated him in the Regional House of Representatives (DPRD) vote with Kaborang winning 11 votes to Kunda's 9. Kaborang was sworn in as regent on 20 June 1994.

During his term, Kaborang focused on agricultural development, and obtained a reputation for clean governance. He especially promoted the cultivation of bananas and cashew trees. Following the expiry of his first term on 5 August 1999, Kaborang ran for a second term, again with Kunda as his competitor. In the 2000 DPRD vote, Kaborang was initially the favorite candidate as the Indonesian Democratic Party of Struggle had backed him, but their legislators defected and voted for Kunda instead. As a result, Kaborang lost after obtaining 9 votes to Kunda's 11.

Kaborang briefly retired from politics after his 2000 defeat, before returning as a member of the Democratic Nationhood Party (PPDK) where he was appointed chairman of its East Sumba branch. Under Kaborang, PPDK gained local success in East Sumba, winning six seats in the DPRD in the 2004 Indonesian legislative election and becoming East Sumba's second-largest party after Golkar. Kaborang became a DPRD member in the election, and was appointed deputy speaker for the 2004–2009 term. In campaigning in 2004, Kaborang extensively used Christianity in his rhetoric, referring to PPDK as "Partai Dengan Kristus" (The Party with Christ). He made another bid for the regency of East Sumba in 2005, with Kunda's 2000–2005 deputy Emanual Babu Eha as his running mate. In the four-way race, Kaborang was again defeated by Kunda in the election, obtaining 36,452 votes (33.7%) to Kunda's 42,991 (39.7%).

Kaborang made yet another run for regent in 2010, losing to Gidion Mbilijora. After his 2010 defeat, he left PPDK and joined the Nasdem Party, winning a seat at East Sumba DPRD in the 2014 election. As late as 2022, he remained active as a local figure in East Sumba.

== Death ==
Kaborang died on 20 April 2026 at the Siloam Hospital in the provincial capital of Kupang. He was buried in Waingapu on 21 May.
