= Umbu Mehang Kunda =

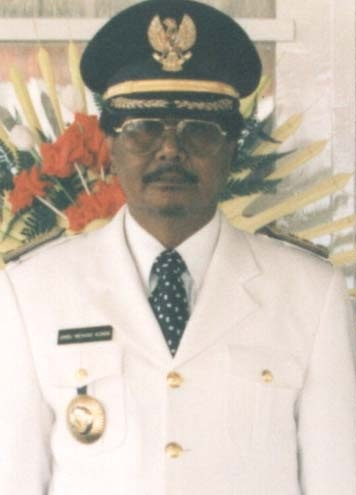
- Kunda as regent of East Sumba

Member of the House of Representatives
- In office 1 October 1987 – 2000

Regent of East Sumba
- In office 31 August 2005 – 2 August 2008
- In office 19 April 2000 – 19 April 2005
- Preceded by: Lukas Mbadi Kaborang
- Succeeded by: Gidion Mbilijora

Personal details
- Born: 14 February 1951 East Sumba, Lesser Sunda, Indonesia
- Died: 2 August 2008 (aged 57) Waingapu, East Nusa Tenggara, Indonesia
- Party: Golkar

Umbu Mehang Kunda (14 February 1951 – 2 August 2008) was an Indonesian civil servant and politician of the Golkar party. Originating from Sumba, he was a member of the House of Representatives (DPR) from 1987 to 2000, and was regent of East Sumba Regency from 2000 until his death in 2008. He was one of the most prominent Sumbanese politicians during his career, and East Sumba's airport would be renamed in his honor.

== Early life ==
Umbu Mehang Kunda was born on 14 February 1951 at the village of Praiyawang in Rindi district, East Sumba Regency, then part of Lesser Sunda province. Kunda's family is part of the traditional aristocracy of Rindi, Umbu being a nobility title, and he had close family ties with the raja of Rindi. After graduating from Anda Luri Catholic High School in Waingapu, Kunda obtained his bachelor's degree in agricultural science from the Satya Wacana Christian University in Salatiga in 1976.

== Career ==
After the completion of his studies, Kunda began to work as a civil servant. Following the 1987 Indonesian legislative election, Kunda became a member of the House of Representatives (DPR) from the Golkar party, where he joined its agricultural commission. During his career in DPR, he would eventually serve as chairman of the Third Commission covering law, security, and human rights.

In March 1997, as political rifts were emerging in Indonesia, Kunda was part of a special committee within DPR tasked with revising parliamentary rules. He spoke out against the United Development Party's attempts to allow a single party to submit a bill without the endorsement of other parliamentary factions, claiming that such a rule would lead to "dictatorship of the majority, or autarchy by the minority". Ultimately, the house rule was revised by reducing the number of signatories required, but the multi-party requirement was retained. His actions as a DPR member during this period gained him much political capital with Golkar's leadership.

=== East Sumba ===
Kunda contested the regency of East Sumba in 1994. He had secured the endorsements of the governor of East Nusa Tenggara and military commander of Kodam IX/Udayana, and was considered the favorite candidate. During the vote by the Regional House of Representatives (DPRD) of East Sumba elected Lukas Mbadi Kaborang as regent instead, with Kunda winning 9 votes to Kaborang's 11. In 2000, Kunda ran again, and defeated Kaborang after Indonesian Democratic Party of Struggle legislators initially expected to vote Kaborang defected and voted for him. The result was 11 votes for Kunda and 9 for Kaborang. He resigned as a DPR member to take office as East Sumba's regent and was sworn in on 19 April 2000.

As regent, Kunda prioritized development around urban areas and industry over agriculture. Using his business connections built up over his time in Jakarta's political scene, Kunda invited investors to set up shop in Sumba, including a drinking water plant. His first term saw East Sumba's municipal government budget balloon due to increased transfers from the central government. Leading up to the elections of 2004 and 2005, Kunda frequented funeral ceremonies throughout East Sumba, giving gifts to the families of the deceased. Under Sumbanese culture, these gifts were normally expected to be repaid, but in most of these cases political support was instead given to Kunda and Golkar. Kunda would be reelected for a second term following a four-way direct election in 2005, again defeating Kaborang after securing 42,991 votes (39.7%). Civil servant Gidion Mbilijora became his deputy. He was sworn in for his second term on 31 August 2005.

During Kunda's second term as regent, political pressure began to build up to split East Sumba into multiple new regencies, with neighboring West Sumba getting split into three (West, Southwest, and Central Sumba) in 2007. East Sumba under Kunda resisted the split, backed by Kunda's political connections in the central government. Prior to his death, Kunda also initiated a project to develop East Sumba as a center for the beef industry.

== Death and legacy ==
Having opened a fair event during the afternoon, Kunda had heart problems on the night of 1 August 2008 and was rushed to Waingapu's Immanuel Clinic where he died around 1:30 AM on 2 August. By afternoon that day, thousands of mourners from East and Central Sumba had arrived at his house. After a funeral lasting over three months, Kunda was buried at his home village of Praiyawang at his family cemetery, next to his grandfather's grave, on 10 November. His gravestone weighed 32 tonnes, and was shaped into a boat. He was married to Silvia Anggreni and had two daughters and a son.

In November 2008, the East Sumba DPRD approved a motion to rename Waingapu's airport to the Umbu Mehang Kunda Airport. The name change was made official in May 2009. He was credited for his ability to represent the Sumbanese in the national political scene.
