= Konservasi Indonesia =

Indonesian environmental foundation and partner of Conservation International

- Yayasan Konservasi Cakrawala Indonesia
- Abbreviation: KI
- Formation: September 2021
- Type: Non-governmental foundation (yayasan)
- Headquarters: South Jakarta, Jakarta, Indonesia
- Region served: Indonesia
- Fields: Environmental conservation; sustainable development
- Affiliations: Main partner of Conservation International in Indonesia since January 2022
- Website: www.konservasi-id.org

Konservasi Indonesia (KI; Yayasan Konservasi Cakrawala Indonesia) is an Indonesian environmental foundation. Since January 2022, it has served as Conservation International's main partner in Indonesia.

Established in September 2021, KI works with government and other stakeholders on environmental conservation and sustainable development in Indonesia. Its programmes include marine conservation and conservation finance in Papua's Bird's Head Seascape, coastal and fisheries initiatives in eastern Indonesia, and peat and mangrove ecosystem work in Sumatra and Papua.

== Overview ==
Konservasi Indonesia was established in September 2021 as a national foundation to continue the track record of Conservation International Indonesia, whose program operations in Indonesia closed in April 2022. Since January 2022, KI has served as Conservation International's main partner in Indonesia, while Conservation International continues as a global partner.

Konservasi Indonesia is based in South Jakarta.

KI organizes its work across three geographic areas, Sundaland, Sunda Banda, and Sahul Papua, alongside national initiatives intended to support Indonesian government targets. Its annual reporting describes Sundaland as covering work in Sumatra, Java and Kalimantan; Sunda Banda as covering Bali, Nusa Tenggara and Maluku; and Sahul Papua as covering Papua and its surrounding islands.

== History ==
Before Konservasi Indonesia was established, Conservation International supported marine conservation work in Indonesia, including in the Bird's Head Seascape. In 2001, it partnered with the Indonesian Institute of Sciences to carry out a marine rapid biodiversity assessment in Raja Ampat, and the results elevated the region to an institutional priority.

In 2004, the Bird's Head Seascape initiative was launched as a multi-partner conservation initiative in the Bird's Head Peninsula region.

During the 2010s, predecessor Conservation International Indonesia also supported marine protected area planning in Bali, with planning beginning in 2010 and the network initiated in 2013 through a memorandum of understanding signed by Bali's provincial and regency marine affairs and fisheries agencies.

Konservasi Indonesia was established in September 2021 as an independent Indonesian foundation, or yayasan, linked to the transition of Conservation International's Indonesia country programme. Conservation International Indonesia closed its program operations in Indonesia in April 2022, and since January 2022 Konservasi Indonesia has served as Conservation International's main partner in Indonesia. It also developed a strategy and business plan intended to maintain programmatic alignment with Conservation International.

Early KI-era milestones included development of the Global Fund for Coral Reefs programme Terumbu Karang Sehat Indonesia, which identified the Bird's Head Seascape and East Sumba in East Nusa Tenggara as priority sites through a preparatory grant phase and subsequent programme design work. In 2024, a U.S.-Indonesia debt-for-nature swap targeted funding for conservation work in the Bird's Head Seascape and the Lesser Sunda-Banda seascape, including a contribution from Conservation International.

== Programmes and operations ==
Selected programme locations mentioned in the article (1 Jakarta, 2 Denpasar, 3 Waingapu, 4 Sorong, 5 Waisai, 6 Kaimana, 7 Manokwari, 8 WPPNRI 572 (west of Sumatra), 9 South Tapanuli Regency, and 10 Muara Batang Toru)

=== Sahul Papua ===
KI's Sahul Papua region covers terrestrial and marine ecosystem work in West Papua and Southwest Papua with local communities, and includes the Bird's Head Seascape as a major programme area.

==== Bird's Head Seascape and marine conservation ====
Konservasi Indonesia is the lead implementing partner for the Global Fund for Coral Reefs programme Terumbu Karang Sehat Indonesia, with priority sites in the Bird's Head Seascape in West Papua and Southwest Papua provinces. The programme includes work intended to strengthen marine protected area management and associated financing arrangements, including revenue sources such as user fees and tourism-related mechanisms. The Bird's Head Seascape includes 266,924 hectares (2,669 km^{2}) of coral reefs; the Bomberai marine protected area authority manages six marine protected areas covering 25,821 hectares (258 km^{2}) of reefs, and Teluk Cenderawasih National Park covers about 80,000 hectares (800 km^{2}) of reefs.

This work builds on earlier Bird's Head Seascape operations supported through offices in Kaimana, Sorong, and Waisai, together with marine protected area field stations and a secretariat office in Manokwari. Activities reported for 2022 included convening a Papuan Advisory Council and developing a mooring-buoy system for Raja Ampat.

==== Peat and mangrove ecosystems ====
From April 2019 to August 2023, Konservasi Indonesia led the International Climate Initiative project Peat and Mangrove Ecosystems in pilot provinces including North Sumatra, West Papua, and part of Southwest Papua. Work in West Papua and Southwest Papua included policy-strengthening work in the West Papua Provincial Forest Management Plan and patrol activities using the Spatial Monitoring and Reporting Tool (SMART).

KI's Sahul Papua work page also describes terrestrial activities under the Mahkota Permata Tanah Papua initiative, community-based forest management in Sorong Selatan and Fakfak, and agroforestry support in Tambrauw.

=== Sunda Banda ===
Konservasi Indonesia's Sunda Banda region covers Bali, the Lesser Sunda Islands, Maluku, and North Maluku.

In Bali, predecessor Conservation International Indonesia supported the development of a provincial marine protected area network. Planning began with a multi-stakeholder workshop in 2010 that identified 25 candidate sites, and the network was initiated in 2013 through a memorandum of understanding signed by Bali's provincial and regency marine affairs and fisheries agencies. Current work in the Sunda Banda region has included support for recovery of 450 hectares (4.5 km^{2}) of forest in Desa Dukuh in Karangasem Regency and coral reef restoration and monitoring in the Tulamben conservation area.

The programme's priority site on Sumba is in East Sumba in East Nusa Tenggara, within marine managed areas zoned under Savu Sea Marine National Park that total 517,092 hectares (5,171 km^{2}) and include an estimated 15,448 hectares (154 km^{2}) of coral reef. Activities there have included baseline socioeconomic and ecological assessments and research on seaweed disease and climate resilience. KI's Sunda Banda work page states that since August 2022 it has also supported sustainable seaweed-farming work in East Sumba involving Universitas Mataram, Universitas Nusa Cendana, and Universitas Kristen Artha Wacana.

In West Nusa Tenggara, activities have included support for marine conservation area management around Moyo Island, Liang-Ngali, and Lipan-Rakit, totaling 65,000 hectares (650 km^{2}), and work related to whale shark conservation in Teluk Saleh.

=== Sundaland ===
Konservasi Indonesia's Sundaland region covers Sumatra, Java, and Kalimantan, with its work-location materials describing current activities especially in North Sumatra and West Java.

From April 2019 to August 2023, Konservasi Indonesia led the International Climate Initiative project Peat and Mangrove Ecosystems, which supported retention and management of peat and mangrove ecosystems across 742,234 hectares (7,422 km^{2}) in pilot provinces including North Sumatra, West Papua, and part of Southwest Papua. Work in North Sumatra included peat restoration in South Tapanuli Regency and a spatial plan analysis for Muara Batang Toru intended to support protection and management of 23,823 hectares (238 km^{2}) of peat ecosystems.

KI's Sundaland work page also describes work in North Sumatra and West Java to conserve forests, wetlands, and marine ecosystems important for climate stability, including support for conservation in Gunung Gede Pangrango National Park.

=== National initiatives ===
A Wetland Strategic Coordination Team was formed through collaboration with Indonesia's National Development Planning Agency (Bappenas) under the Peat and Mangrove Ecosystems project, and the team produced a National Strategy for Peat and Mangrove Wetland Ecosystems document.

In November 2022, the Government of Indonesia announced a model for ocean conservation and fisheries management that was introduced during meetings in Bali, with support from the Green Climate Fund, Conservation International, and Konservasi Indonesia. In September 2024, Konservasi Indonesia participated in a workshop in Jakarta intended to formalize the establishment of a national Marine Protected Areas Co-Management Committee, alongside government agencies and other non-governmental organizations.

Selected programme landscapes and marine ecosystems of Konservasi Indonesia
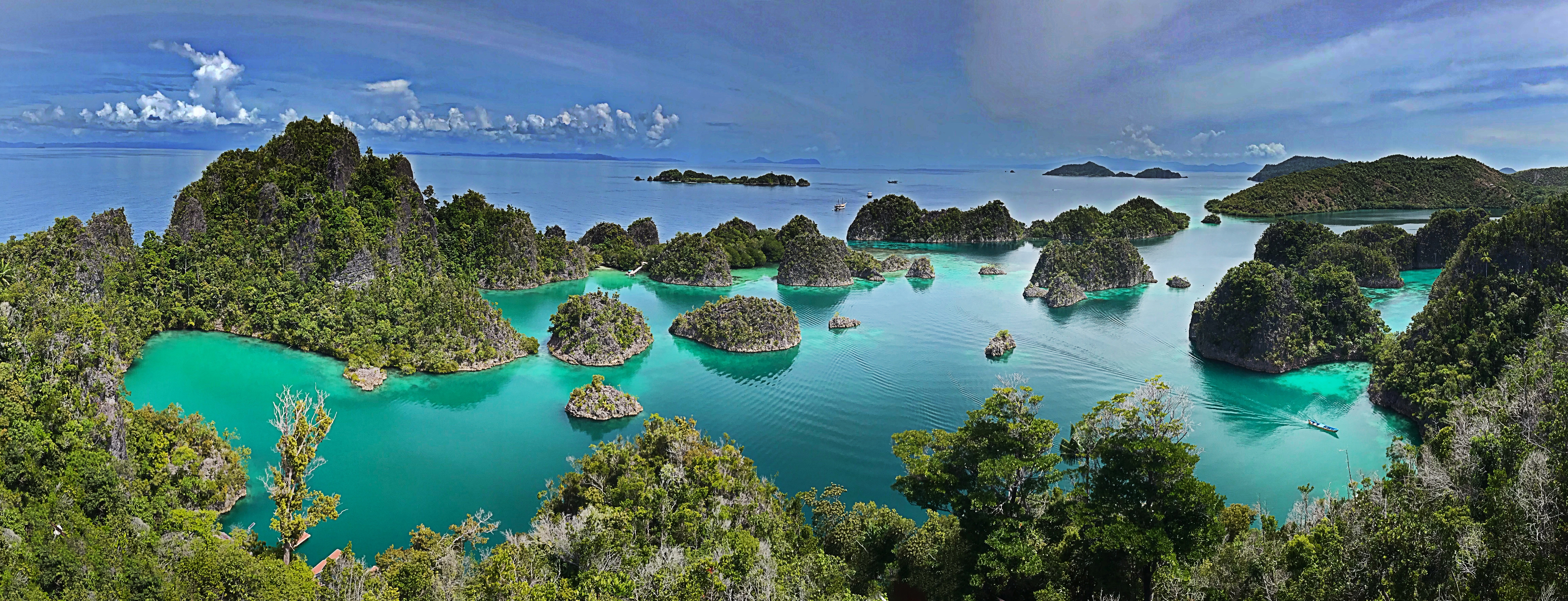
Piaynemo in Raja Ampat, within the Bird's Head Seascape region

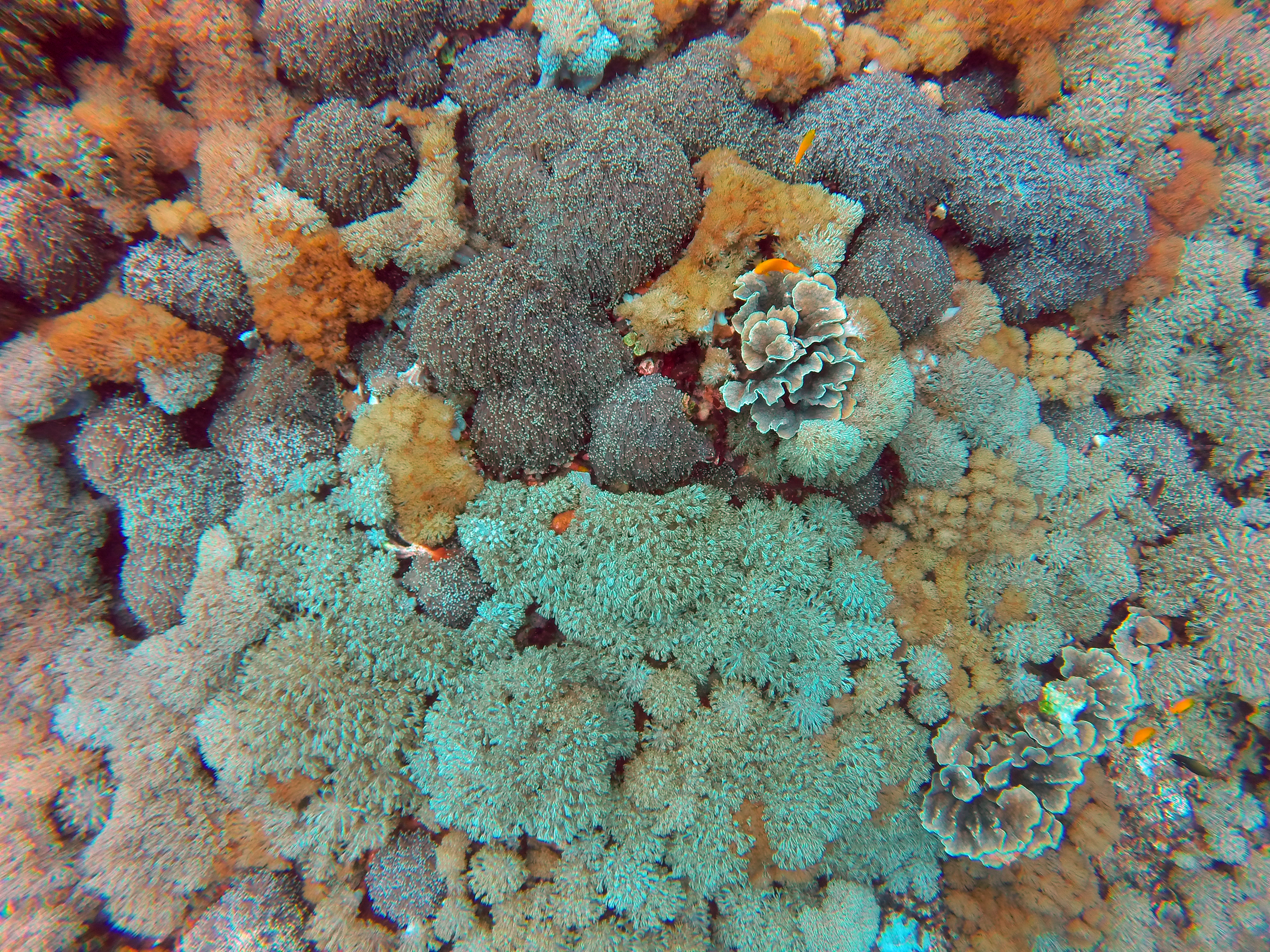
Soft coral garden near Tulamben, Bali

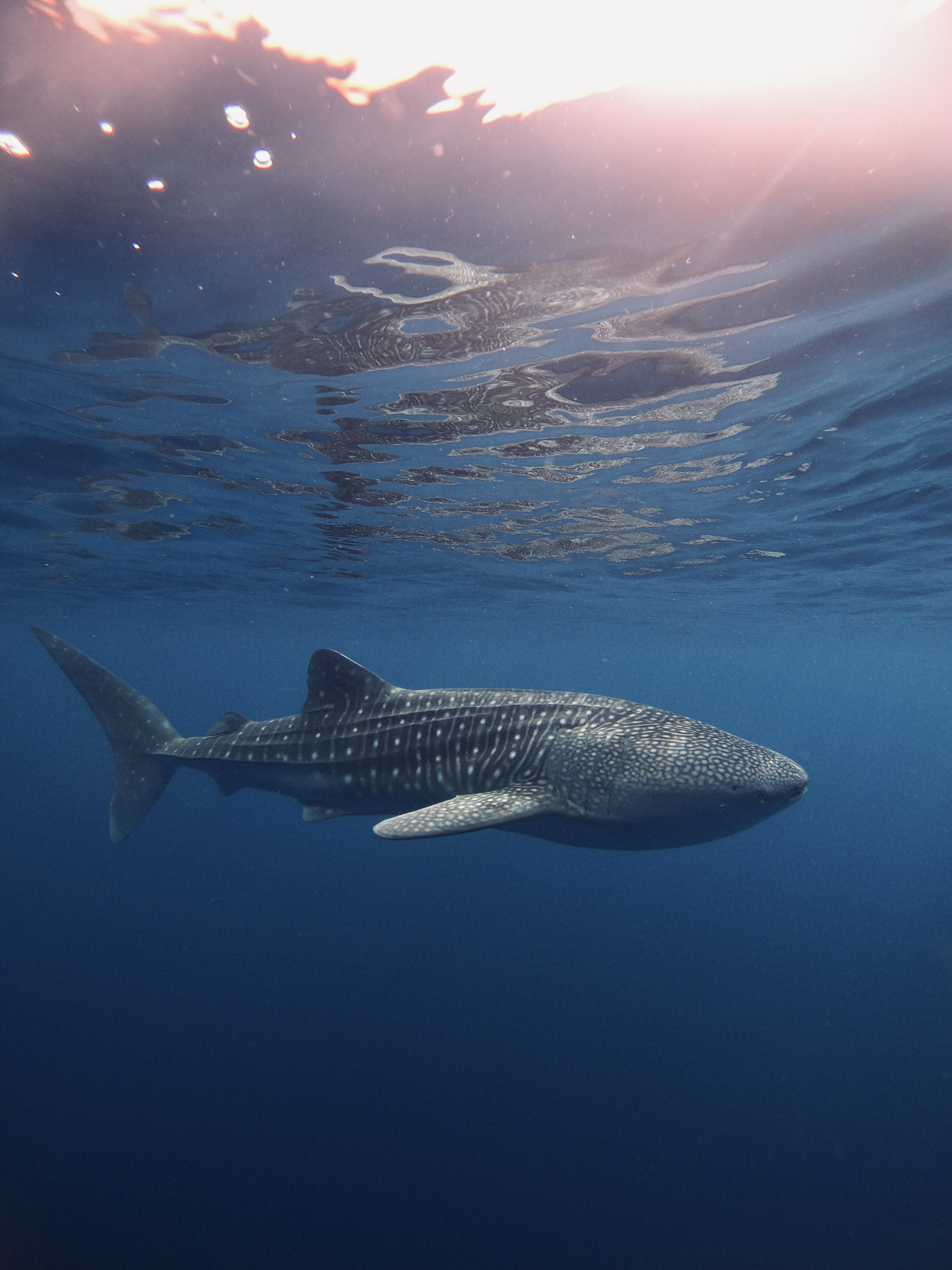
Whale shark in Teluk Saleh, Sumbawa

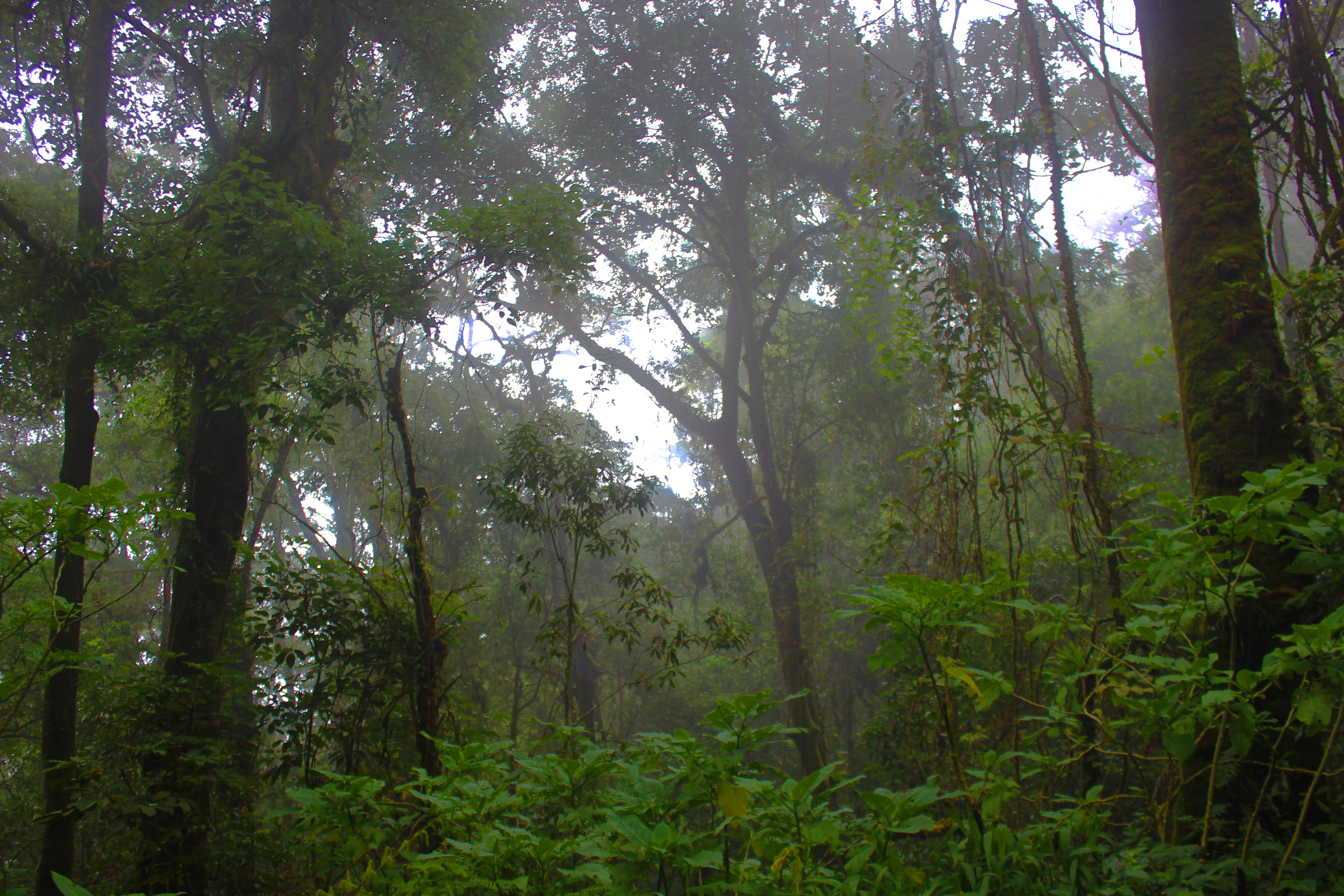
Forest in Mount Gede Pangrango National Park, West Java

== Funding and conservation finance ==
Financing for KI's marine conservation work in Papua developed from earlier Bird's Head Seascape arrangements. In Raja Ampat, key finance-linked mechanisms included the tourism entrance fee system, the marine protected area patrol system, and the Blue Abadi Fund. Blue Abadi, administered by the Indonesian Biodiversity Foundation (KEHATI), was launched in 2017 to address remaining funding gaps in the Bird's Head Seascape. It was Indonesia's first dedicated marine conservation trust fund and had funding commitments of US$23.45 million as of October 2021, with a five-year strategy centred on co-management of at least 3.6 million hectares of the seascape's marine protected area network and support for local civil society organisations.

A major later vehicle for KI's conservation-finance work was the Global Fund for Coral Reefs programme Terumbu Karang Sehat Indonesia (TeKSI), which combined revenue measures such as user fees, ecotourism, and mariculture with grant and investment tools for reef-positive businesses. The initial 18-month phase combined US$3.0 million from GFCR with US$2.325 million in co-financing and set out an eight-year investment ambition of about US$73.1 million. By the end of 2024, the related CI Ventures portfolio had disbursed US$1.7 million to four companies.

The programme also supported user-pay and other public-service financing mechanisms in marine protected areas. In the Bomberai marine protected areas, service-tariff regulations were being implemented through a regional public-service agency (BLUD), and five cruise ships carrying 682 tourists generated about US$46,000 in Kaimana between October and November 2024. In Raja Ampat, pilot mooring buoys were deployed in 2024 under a user-fee mechanism intended to fund procurement, placement, and maintenance. In West Sumatra, protected-area planning in Fishery Management Area WPPNRI 572 was linked to BLUD development and a proposed surf-fee regulation.

In western Indonesia, KI also developed the Blue Halo S initiative, in Indonesian-language materials called Konservasi Alam dan Perikanan Lestari (KAIL). A Green Climate Fund project-preparation facility approved in November 2022 centred the pilot on Fishery Management Area WPPNRI 572 west of Sumatra and paired a proposed blue bond or similar instrument with a grant-based Blue Ecosystem Adaptation Mechanism (BEAM). KI and Indonesia's Environment Fund Management Agency (BPDLH) were identified as indicative executing entities for proposal development.

A 2024 U.S.–Indonesia debt-for-nature swap added another financing channel for KI-linked coral reef work. The agreements reduced Indonesia's debt payments by US$35 million over nine years and redirected the proceeds into grants for coral reef protection and restoration through a conservation fund, with KI as the fund administrator. The arrangement focused on the Bird's Head, Lesser Sunda, and Banda seascapes.

== Partnerships ==
Konservasi Indonesia's partnerships include international conservation organisations, Indonesian public agencies, research institutions, finance entities, and community bodies. Since January 2022, it has served as Conservation International's main partner in Indonesia. In the Bird's Head Seascape, documented partners have included the Indonesian Biodiversity Foundation (KEHATI) through the Blue Abadi Fund, together with the Ministry of Marine Affairs and Fisheries, The Nature Conservancy, and WWF in long-term marine conservation and financing arrangements.

Programme reporting for Terumbu Karang Sehat Indonesia listed additional named partners in Papua and eastern Indonesia. These included Papua State University, University of Nusa Cendana, Artha Wacana Christian University, University of Mataram, and Hatch Innovation Services as research partners; Blue Abadi Fund/KEHATI and EON Engineering as community partners; and the Raja Ampat and Bomberai marine protected area authorities, the national marine protected areas management authority under the Ministry of Marine Affairs and Fisheries, and the East Nusa Tenggara Provincial Conservation Board among implementation partners and authorities.

Other clearly evidenced partnerships in KI's regional and national work have included technical guidance from Cargill in East Sumba, Indonesia's Environment Fund Management Agency (BPDLH) in Blue Halo S project preparation, and Indonesia's National Development Planning Agency (Bappenas) in peat and mangrove wetland coordination.

== Impact and evaluation ==
In the Bird's Head Seascape, shifts in the traditional funding structure created pressure to transfer more management responsibility to local bodies and establish a sustainable funding model. Seascape-scale governance has also been linked to clear baselines, strong monitoring and evaluation, adequate institutional capacity, broad political support, and durable finance.

Among the seascapes examined, Bird's Head was identified as having one of the strongest monitoring and evaluation systems and one of the strongest records of reported impact. Between 2017 and 2021, Blue Abadi raised more than US$23.45 million and distributed US$4.1 million in grants to 27 Indonesian conservation partners, while destructive fishing declined, fish biomass increased, and coral reef health was maintained in monitored areas.

Limitations remained. Blue Abadi was undercapitalized relative to updated annual financing needs, four marine protected areas in Kaimana had not received direct funding because local institutions lacked grant-receiving capacity, and the initiative still faced challenges in becoming embedded as a locally rooted institution in West Papua.

For KI's post-2021 implementation, TeKSI's framework was integrated into KI's broader monitoring system and included review cycles intended to support adaptive management. Its 2024 outputs included baseline assessments in East Sumba, and an investment pipeline of 62 companies. Major risks included funding gaps, delays linked to government leadership changes, and limited access to finance for reef-positive enterprises.
