= Khristofel Praing =

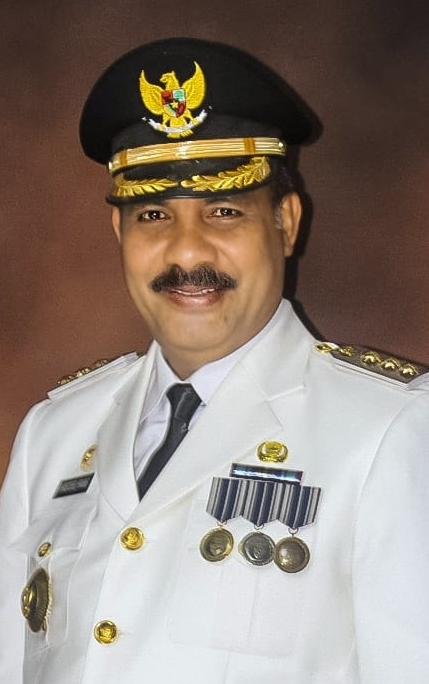

Regent of East Sumba
- In office 26 February 2021 – 20 February 2025
- Preceded by: Gidion Mbilijora
- Succeeded by: Umbu Lili Pekuwali

Personal details
- Born: 16 November 1965 (age 60) Waingapu, East Nusa Tenggara, Indonesia

Khristofel Praing (born 16 November 1965) is an Indonesian politician and former civil servant who served as the regent of East Sumba, East Nusa Tenggara from 2021 to 2025. Prior to becoming regent, he worked for the regency government for around 20 years.

== Early life ==
Khristofel Praing was born in Waingapu, East Sumba on 16 November 1965. He was the fourth of eight children of Umbu Jabu Anggung Praing and Rambu Hoy Mila Meha. Anggung Praing died when Khristofel was fourteen. He completed basic education in Waingapu, graduating from high school in 1985 before he continued to Kupang's Home Affairs Governance Academy (Akademi Pemerintahan Dalam Negeri/APDN) where he graduated in 1989 with a diploma. Praing later obtained a bachelor's degree from the Home Affairs Governance Institute in Jakarta in 1995, and a master's degree from Padjadjaran University in 1999.

== Career ==
After receiving his diploma, Praing worked in the municipal government of East Sumba. By 1991, he was lurah (urban village head) of Prailiu, and in 2001 he was appointed as district head of Pandawai. He occupied several more posts afterwards, including head of East Sumba's environmental agency (2009–2011) and head of its civil registration agency (2013–2020). During his tenure in the civil registration agency, Praing campaigned for the recognition of the Marapu religion for Indonesian identity cards and was a witness at the Constitutional Court of Indonesia trial on the issue (which ruled in favor of recognition in 2016). Praing stated in 2018 that there were over 18 thousand Marapu adherents in East Sumba.

In the 2020 regency election, Praing ran for the regent position with David Melo Wadu as his running mate. Praing and Wadu were supported by PDI-P, Nasdem, PAN, Hanura, Demokrat, Gerindra, and PKPI. They defeated Umbu Lili Pekuwali (2015–2020 vice regent) after securing 80,152 votes (57.2%). Praing and Wadu were sworn in on 26 February 2021.

During Praing's tenure, the regency government launched an agricultural information app intended to inform farmers on weather forecasts, flooding risks, and pest outbreaks. He also promoted the restoration of sandalwood trees in Sumba.

Praing ran for reelection in the 2024 regency election, but was defeated by Umbu Lili Pekuwali. Priang secured 56,668 votes (39.1%) in the three-way race, while Pekuwali won 66,293 votes (45.75%). Praing's 2021–2025 deputy David Melo Wadu was the third candidate with 21,938 votes (15.1%). Pekuwali was sworn in to replace Praing on 20 February 2025 and the two held a handover ceremony on 1 March.

== Personal life ==
Praing is married to Merliaty Simanjuntak, who he appointed in 2023 as a senior advisor in the municipal government. The couple has four children. One of their daughters, Rambu Konda Anggung Priang, was elected in 2019 to serve in the provincial legislature of East Nusa Tenggara.
