= Umbu Lili Pekuwali =

Indonesian politician (born 1973)

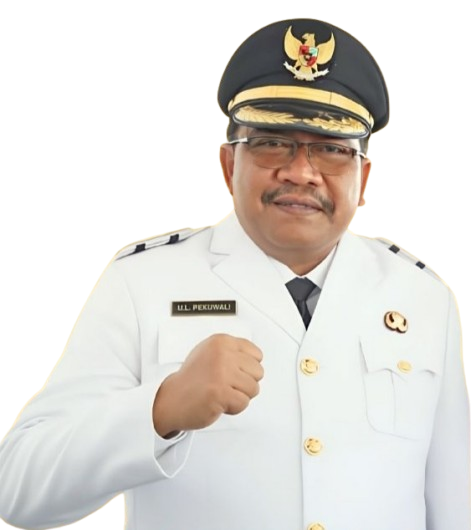
- Pekuwali in 2025

Regent of East Sumba
- Incumbent
- Assumed office 20 February 2025
- Preceded by: Khristofel Praing

Vice Regent of East Sumba
- In office 17 February 2016 – 17 February 2021
- Regent: Gidion Mbilijora
- Preceded by: Matius Kitu
- Succeeded by: David Melo Wadu

Personal details
- Born: 1 April 1973 (age 52) Waingapu, East Nusa Tenggara, Indonesia
- Political party: Golkar

Umbu Lili Pekuwali (born 1 April 1973) is an Indonesian former civil servant and politician of the Golkar party who has served as the regent of East Sumba, East Nusa Tenggara since February 2025. He had previously been East Sumba's vice regent under regent Gidion Mbilijora between 2016 and 2021, and worked in its municipal government before that.

== Early life ==
Umbu Lili Pekuwali was born on 1 April 1973 in Waingapu, East Sumba. He completed his basic education at state-funded schools in Waingapu, graduating from Waingapu State High School No. 1 (SMAN 1 Waingapu) in 1991. He then moved to Yogyakarta where he studied at the Atma Jaya University and received a bachelor's degree in 1998. He later also received a master's degree from Sepuluh Nopember Institute of Technology in Surabaya in 2005.

== Career ==
After completing his studies at Atma Jaya, Pekuwali worked for the regency government of East Sumba. In 2015, Gidion Mbilijora selected Pekuwali as his running mate in the 2015 regency election, and the pair was elected with 54.85% of the votes. Pekuwali was sworn in as vice regent on 17 February 2016. In 2020, Pekuwali ran in the regency election to succeed Mbilijora, but he was defeated by Khristofel Praing. When registering for the 2020 election, Pekuwali's campaign team organized a public march, which resulted in Pekuwali receiving a reprimand from the Ministry of Home Affairs for violating pandemic safety protocols.

In the 2024 East Sumba regency election, Pekuwali made another bid for regent, this time defeating Praing after winning 66,293 votes (47.5%) in the three-way race. Pekuwali was sworn in as regent on 20 February 2025. Under Pekuwali, the municipal government launched a subsidy program for seeds and fertilizer aimed at boosting agricultural production.

Politically, he is a member of Golkar, and has been chairman of the party's East Sumba branch since his election by acclamation in 2019.

== Personal life ==
Pekuwali is a Protestant Christian. He is married to Diana Novita Rambu Bangi Ata. They both contracted COVID-19 shortly after Pekuwali's loss in the 2020 election, as East Sumba's 35th and 36th detected cases respectively.
