= WRRW =

WRRW may refer to:

- Waingapu Airport (ICAO code WRRW)
- WRRW-LP, a defunct low-power radio station (100.9 FM) formerly licensed to serve Williamsburg, Virginia, United States
