= 2024 East Sumba regency election =

Local election in Indonesia

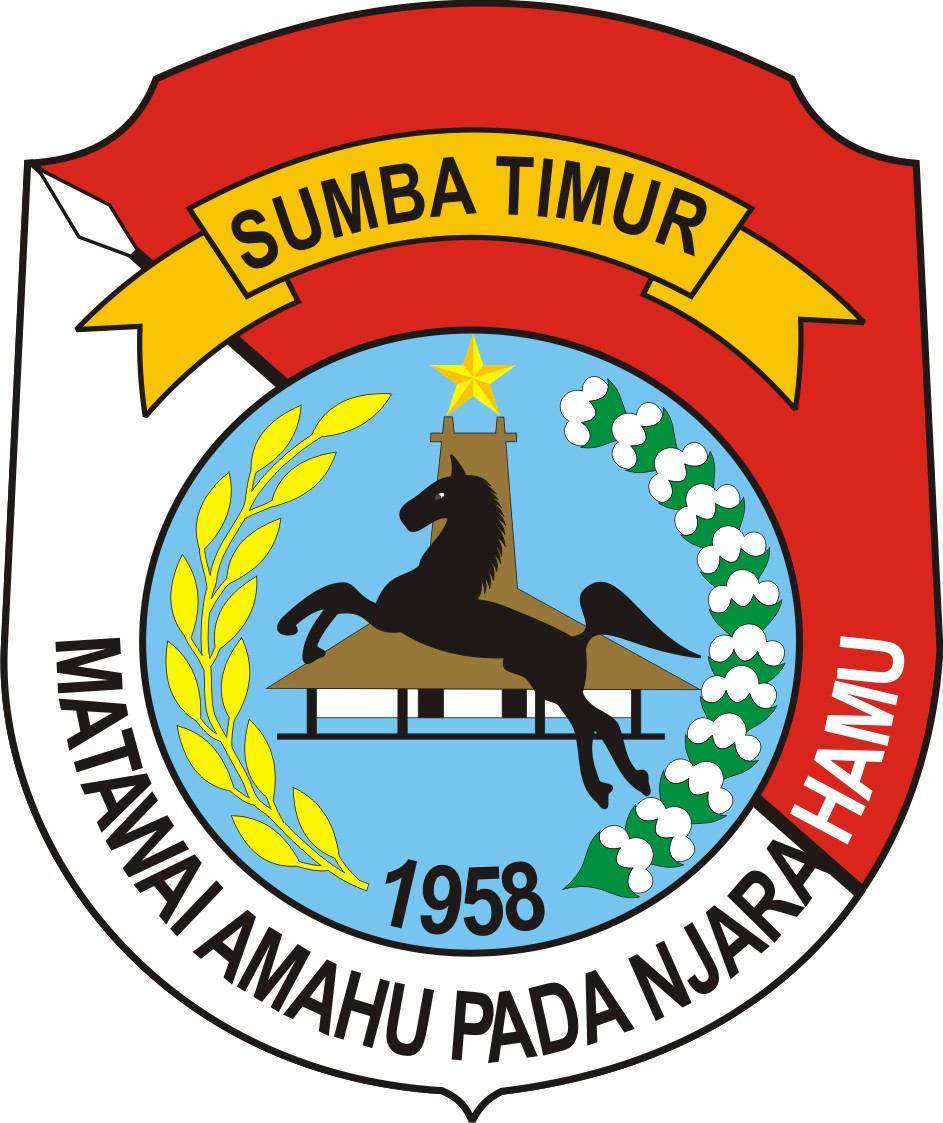
- 27 November 2024
- Turnout: 77.38%
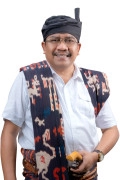

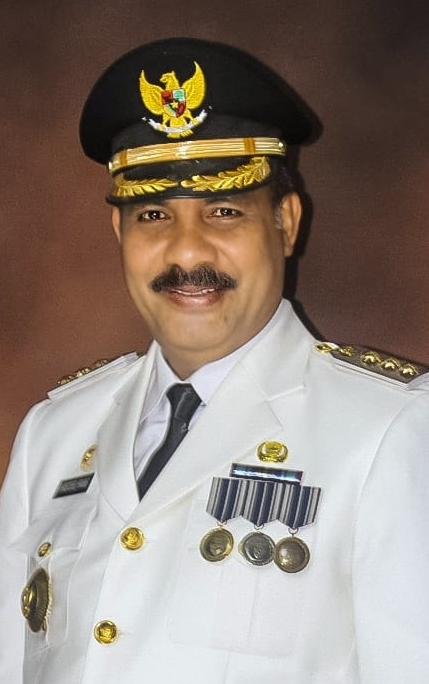

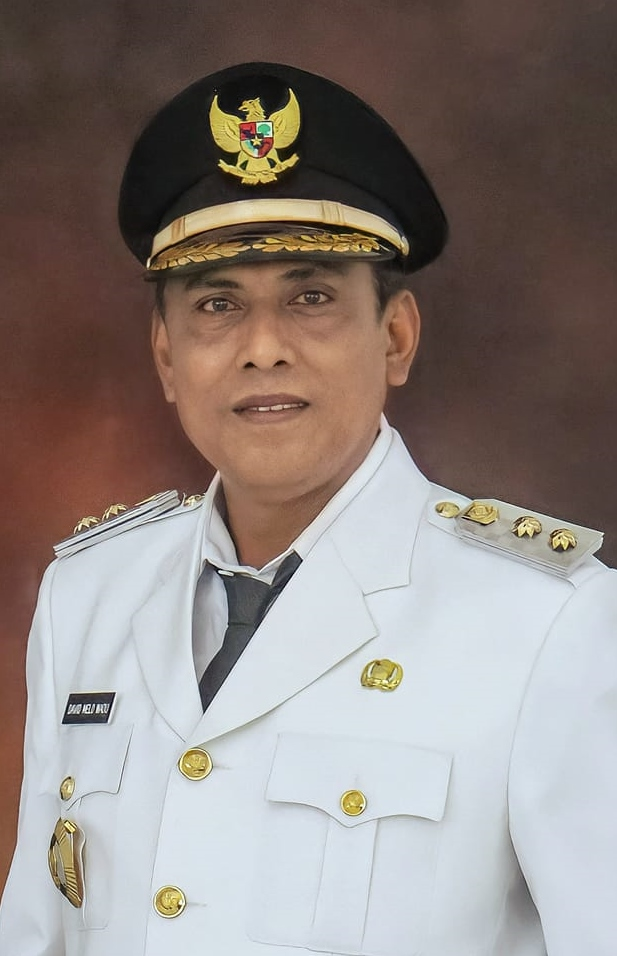
Candidate	Umbu Lili Pekuwali	Khristofel Praing	David Melo Wadu
Party	Golkar	PAN	PDI-P
Running mate	Yonathan Hani	Franky Ranggambani	Umbu Ndata Jawa Kori
Popular vote	66,293	56,668	21,938
Percentage	45.75%	39.11%	15.14%
Regent before election
Khristofel Praing
PAN
Elected Regent
Umbu Lili Pekuwali
Golkar

The 2024 East Sumba regency election was held on 27 November 2024 as part of nationwide local elections to elect the regent of East Sumba Regency, East Nusa Tenggara for a five-year term. The previous election was held in 2020. Golkar candidate and former vice regent Umbu Lili Pekuwali defeated incumbent regent Khristofel Praing and incumbent vice regent David Melo Wadu, who ran on separate tickets.

== Electoral system ==
The election, like other local elections in 2024, follow the first-past-the-post system where the candidate with the most votes wins the election, even if they do not win a majority. It is possible for a candidate to run uncontested, in which case the candidate is still required to win a majority of votes "against" an "empty box" option. Should the candidate fail to do so, the election will be repeated on a later date.

== Candidates ==
According to electoral regulations, for regencies with an electorate of less than 250 thousand (such as East Sumba, which had an electorate of around 186 thousand in the 2024 election), candidates were required to secure the support of a political party or a coalition of parties which collectively won at least 10 percent of votes in the 2024 legislative election for the municipal legislature.

The incumbent regent of East Sumba, Khristofel Praing, ran for a second term in the election. As running mate, Praing ran with Franky Ranggambani, a municipal bureaucrat. The pair received the endorsements of the National Mandate Party (PAN), Demokrat, and Hanura, along with the Ummat Party. Praing's deputy in the 2021–2025 term David Melo Wadu of the Indonesian Democratic Party of Struggle (PDI-P) ran on a separate ticket, with law office owner Umbu Ndata Jawa Kori as his running mate. The ticket received the endorsements of PDI-P and Gelora. Another candidate, Umbu Lili Pekuwali, had served as vice regent of East Sumba from 2016 to 2021, and had lost the 2020 election to Praing. His running mate Yonathan Hani served as a member of the municipal legislature, and was a deputy speaker in the 2019–2024 term. Pekuwali and Hani were backed by a coalition of six parties (Golkar, Gerindra, Nasdem, PKB, PSI, and Perindo).

== Campaign ==
Two rounds of public debates between the candidates were held on 26 October and 16 November 2024 in Waingapu.

=== Polling ===
Pollster	Date	Sample size	Pekuwali	Praing	Wadu	Others
Charta Politika	29 April – 4 May 2024	400	41.3%	36.3%	9%	13.5%

== Results ==
Candidate	Running mate	Candidate party	Votes	%
Umbu Lili Pekuwali	Yonathan Hani	Golkar	66,293	45.75
Khristofel Praing	Franky Ranggambani	PAN	56,668	39.11
David Melo Wadu	Umbu Ndata Jawa Kori	PDI-P	21,938	15.14
Total			144,899	100.00
Source: East Sumba KPU

The electoral turnout was 77.38 percent (compared to a national average of 68.48%), the highest turnout among local elections in East Nusa Tenggara. Pekuwali was sworn in to replace Praing on 20 February 2025 and the two held a handover ceremony on 1 March.
