= Gidion Mbilijora =

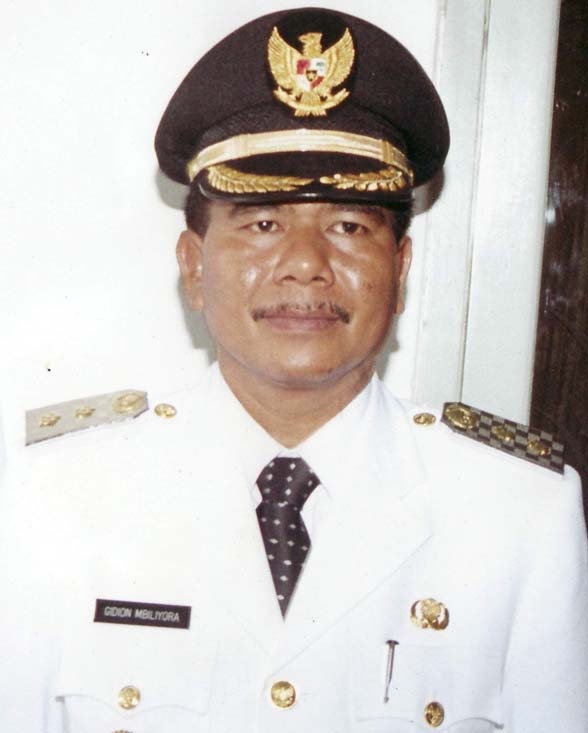

Regent of East Sumba
- In office 17 February 2016 – 17 February 2021
- In office 22 September 2008 – 31 August 2015
- Preceded by: Umbu Mehang Kunda
- Succeeded by: Khristofel Praing

Personal details
- Born: 27 May 1960 (age 66) East Sumba, East Nusa Tenggara, Indonesia
- Party: Nasdem; Golkar (formerly)

Gidion Mbilijora (born 27 May 1960) is an Indonesian former civil servant and politician of the Nasdem Party. He served as the regent of East Sumba, East Nusa Tenggara from 2008 to 2015 and from 2016 to 2021, after previously serving as vice regent under Umbu Mehang Kunda from 2005 to 2008. His tenure saw the development of a new sugarcane estate and the promotion of luxury tourism in East Sumba. Formerly a Golkar member, he joined Nasdem after his term as regent.

== Early life ==
Gidion Mbilijora was born in East Sumba Regency on 27 May 1960. Since he was 9 months old, he lived with his grandparents, with his grandfather being a priest. Mbilijora completed elementary school at a Catholic school in 1972, a Protestant middle school in 1975, and graduated high school in Waingapu in 1980. He later obtained his bachelor's in public administration from Nusa Cendana University in 1987, and a master's degree also in public administration from Gadjah Mada University in 1998.

== Career ==
Mbilijora worked as a civil servant in East Sumba's regency government. He worked within its Regional Secretariat, until 1998 when he was transferred to its development planning agency. He was transferred back to the Secretariat and appointed assistant for economics and development in 2002. That year, he was also appointed head of East Sumba's food resilience agency. In 2005, he became the running mate to incumbent regent Umbu Mehang Kunda's reelection campaign, and the pair was elected. Following Kunda's death on 2 August 2008, Mbilijora was appointed to replace him as regent on 22 September 2008. Mbilijora was elected chairman of Golkar's East Sumba branch that year.

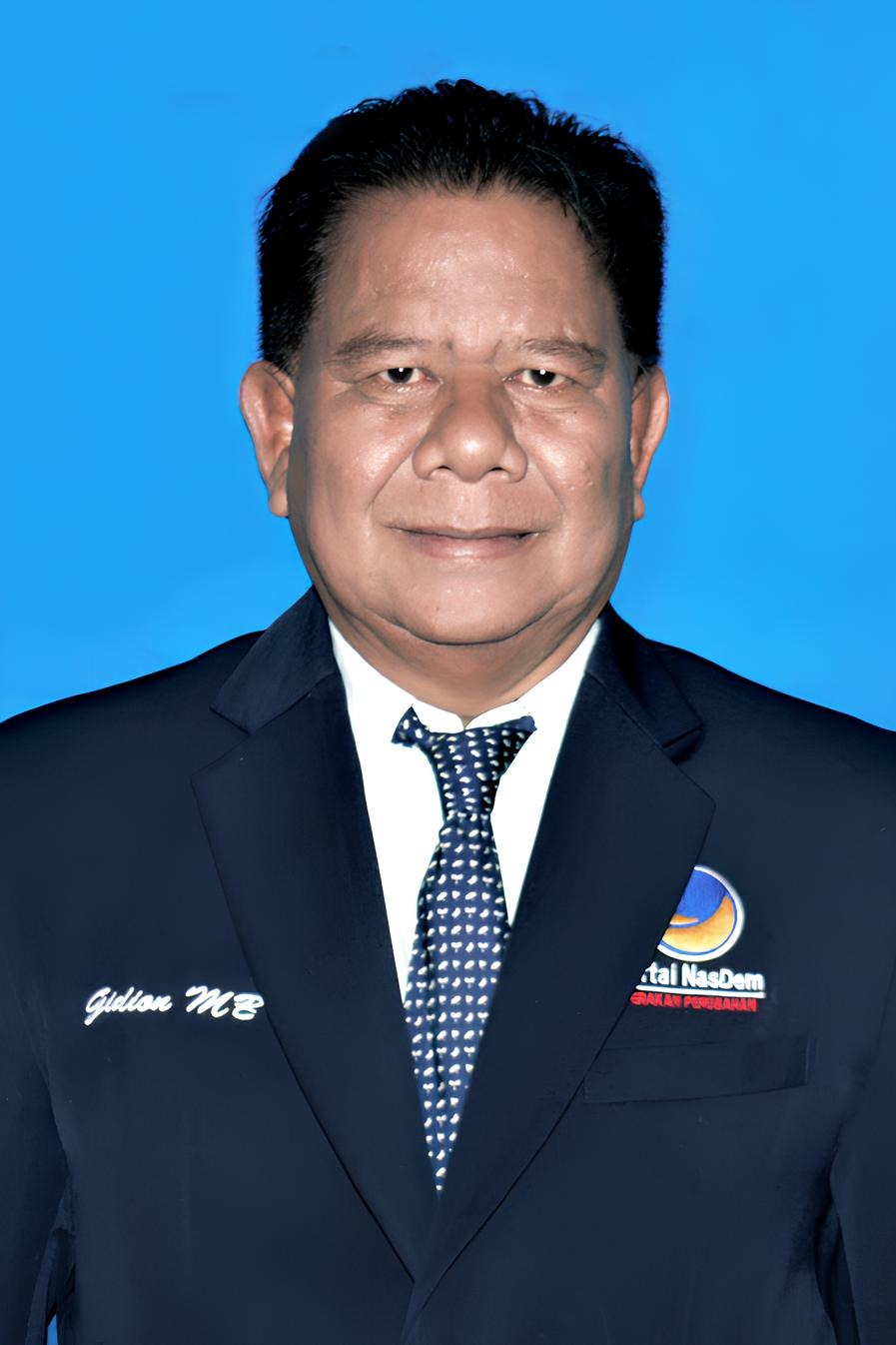
Mbilijora as a Nasdem candidate, 2024.

He would be elected for a full term in the 2010 regency election, winning 57,647 votes (49.5%) in a five-way race. Matius Kitu became his vice regent. Mbilijora was reelected for his second full term in 2015, defeating Matius Kitu after securing 65,120 votes (54.85%). When running for his second full term in 2015, he reported his assets at Rp 4.24 billion, mostly in form of cash/savings and land in East Sumba. His first full term expired on 31 August 2015, and he was sworn in for his second on 17 February 2016.

President Susilo Bambang Yudhoyono (SBY) visited Sumba in July 2012, and Mbilijora briefly vacated his official residence in Waingapu for SBY to use and stay in. During his 2015–2020 term, East Sumba's government granted a 30-year concession for 18,000 hectares of land to be used as a sugarcane plantation and sugar factory by a Djarum subsidiary. The first stone for the factory was placed in 2018. This concession resulted in a land conflict with Marapu adherents in Sumba which inhabited the land, and Mbilijora defended the sugarcane plantation against accusations of human rights violations.

Mbilijora also promoted tourism in East Sumba, specifically luxury resorts, capitalizing on relatively less known beaches and destinations in the regency. He cited limited access to East Sumba as a bottleneck in tourism development, and called for the central government to push for increased flights to East Sumba. The municipal government under Mbilijora allocated land for the development of a new airport which would allow larger aircraft. During the COVID-19 pandemic, Mbilijora ordered for ships carrying tourists to be denied docking at Waingapu's port, including one tourist boat carrying 10 foreign travellers which had already arrived.

After the end of his tenure as regent, Mbilijora joined the Nasdem Party. In the 2024 election, he ran as a Nasdem candidate for a seat in the House of Representatives from East Nusa Tenggara's 2nd district, and won 11,170 votes, but failed to secure a seat. He is a supporter of the redistricting of East Sumba, which would see the formation of new regencies split out of it. He remarked that East Sumba had been ripe for redistricting "since 1960".

== Personal life ==
Mbilijora is a Protestant Christian. He is married to Rambu Kahi Yani, and the couple has one daughter, Putri Permatasari Mbilijora. He describes himself as a chess enthusiast. In 2024, it became known that part of his private house in Waingapu was constructed on government land, and he offered to exchange the ~200 square meters of government land with a ~500 square meter plot he owned.
