= Banana production in Indonesia =

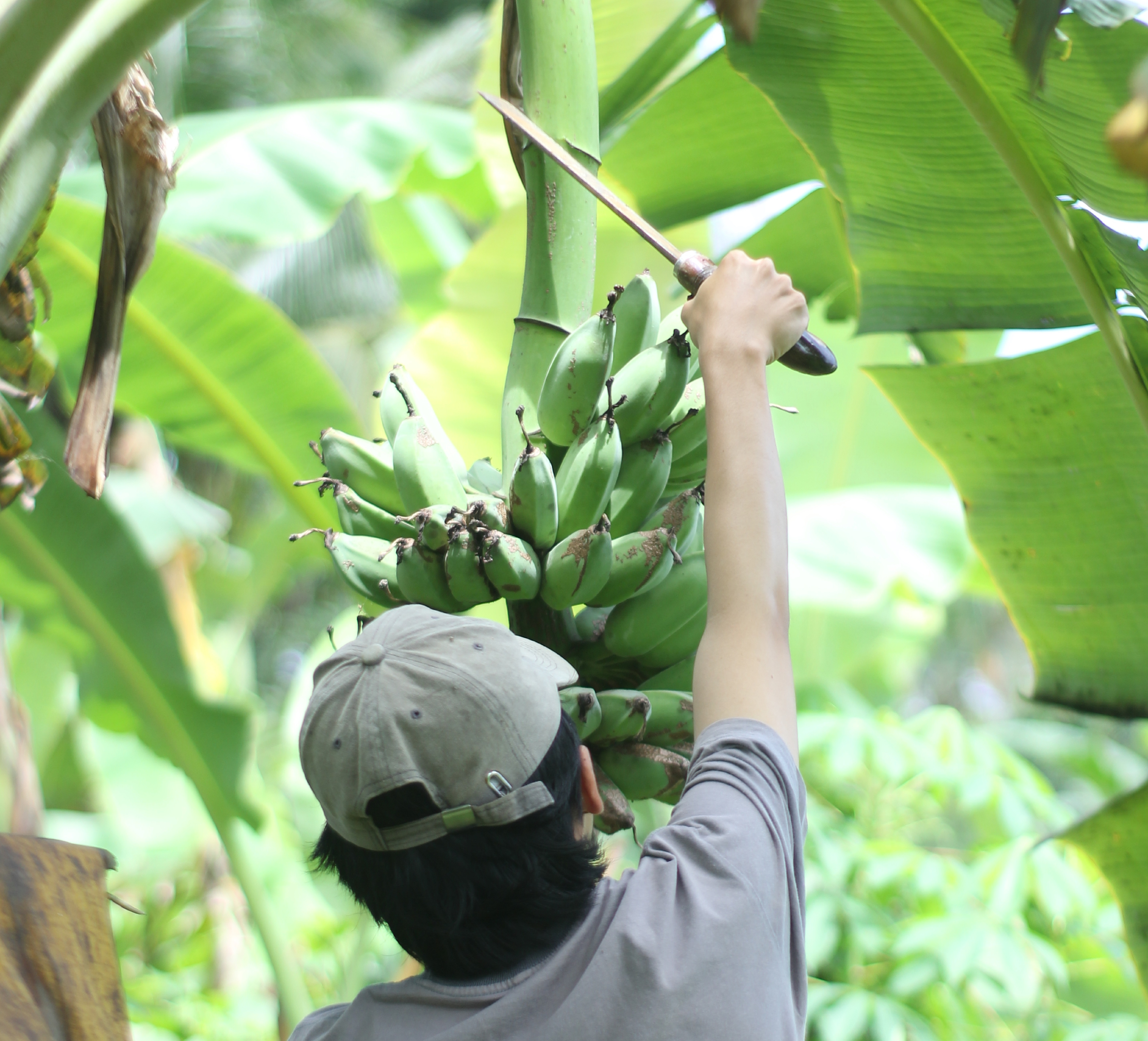
A man harvesting bananas in West Java.

Banana production in Indonesia is a major agricultural sector, with Indonesia being one of the largest producers in the world. The crop was introduced to the region during prehistoric times, and remains a staple in some parts of the country. It is by a wide margin the most-produced fruit in the country, with nearly 10 million tonnes harvested in 2024. Banana cultivation is widespread in the country, with presence in every province, although the largest producers are East Java, Lampung, and West Java. Nearly all of national production is consumed domestically, with exports taking up only a tiny proportion of production.

== History ==
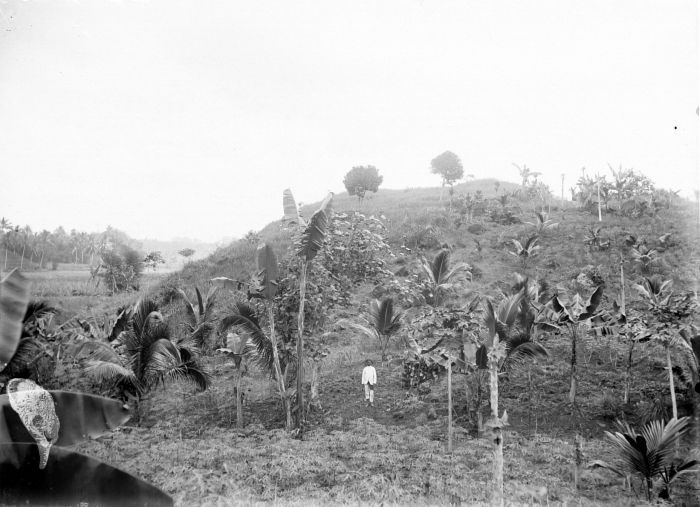
Banana plants at a hillside during the colonial period.

Bananas were likely first domesticated in the Kuk Swamp area of present-day Papua New Guinea some 7,000 years before present, and spread soon after that to the rest of the island, then across the Indonesian archipelago and mainland Southeast Asia over the following 2,000 years. Austronesian sailors from present-day Indonesia would also introduce bananas and other crops to Madagascar. Early European accounts from the sixteenth and seventeenth centuries of agriculture in many parts of Sulawesi noted that bananas were widely cultivated as a staple food along with taro, yam, and sago.

During the Dutch colonial period, bananas from Java were exported to Australia, and after the interruption caused by the Japanese occupation of Indonesia the trade resumed for some time. Parts of the country such as Nias and Mentawai saw bananas remained a staple crop into the twentieth century, with both the Dutch East Indies and Indonesian governments promoting rice cultivation in lieu of bananas. Some areas retained bananas as a staple crop and rejected rice cultivation, or retained banana production for local consumption while exporting produced rice. In areas where rice became the dominant crop, bananas are both planted as part of a crop rotation with rice along with a variety of other foodcrops and as part of an intercropping system. The cavendish banana was introduced to plantations around the 1980s. Bananas have been cited as a contributor to Indonesian food security in face of potential crop failures due to climate change.

== Cultivation ==
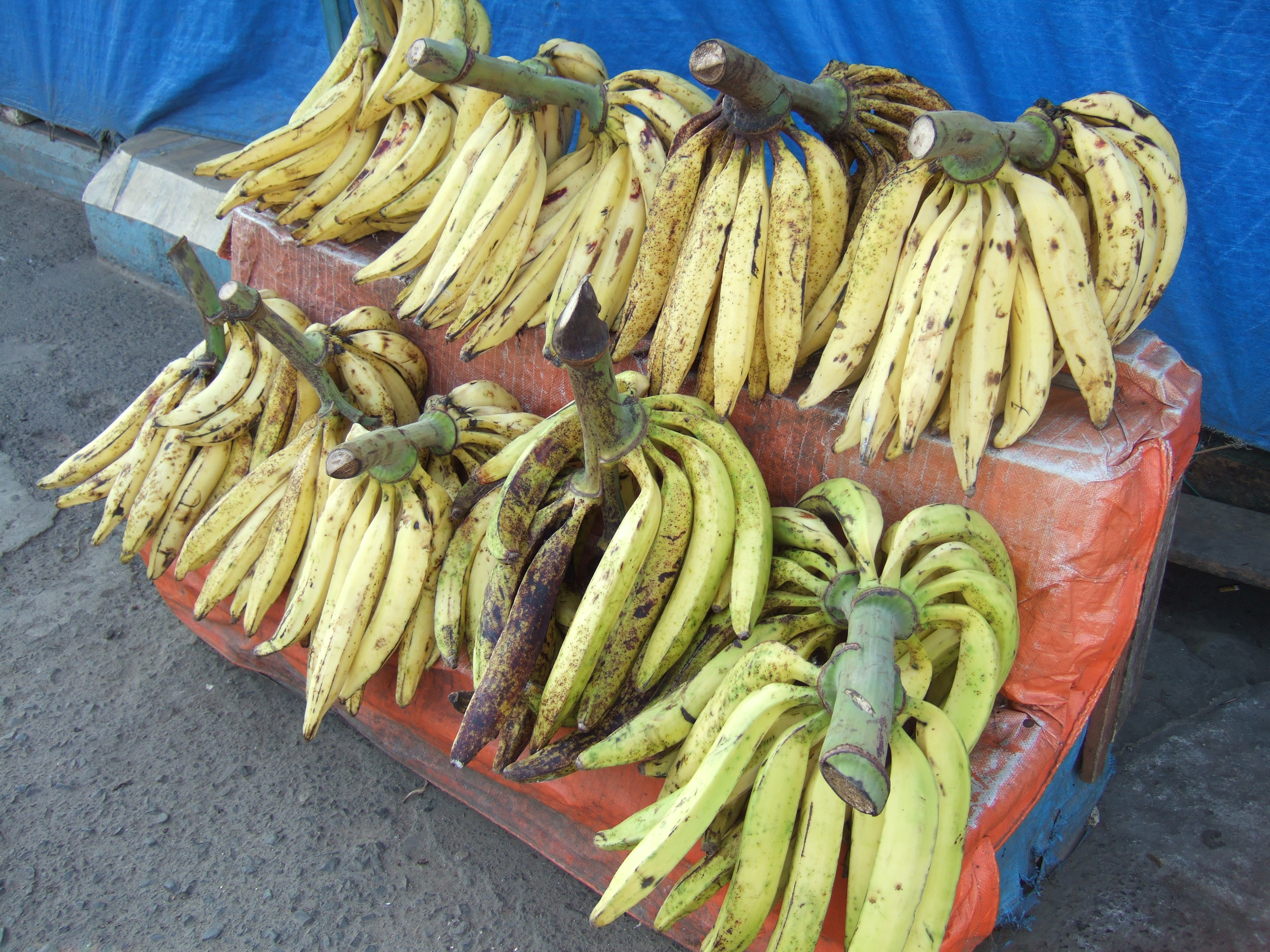
Tanduk bananas (true plantains) for sale in Lampung.

The National Research and Innovation Agency estimated that over 300 varieties of bananas are cultivated throughout the country, with many regions having their own flagship varieties. Some of the varieties are not actively cultivated and grow wild. Aside from cavendish bananas, other nationally popular varieties include Barangan, Pisang mas, Raja, Tanduk, and Kepok.

Most banana producers are small-scale, with 63 percent of banana farmers cultivating bananas on plots of land smaller than 1 hectare (2.5 acres). Among the largest producers nationwide is Great Giant Foods, which produces bananas (along with other fruit products) for Indonesian retail stores under the Sunpride brand, and its 3,700-hectare plantation in East Lampung Regency is the largest banana plantation in the country.

Bananas are cultivated in every province in the country. East Java is the largest producer of bananas nationwide, making up over a quarter of national production in 2022. It is followed by Lampung, West Java, Central Java, and South Sumatra. Malang Regency is East Java's biggest banana producer. Lumajang, also a major producer in East Java, has branded itself as the "banana city" to promote its production. In parts of Eastern Indonesia, e.g. in Timor and Papua, bananas are still considered a staple food.

Aside from the fruit, banana leaves are widely used in Indonesia, mostly as a food wrapper. Banana flowers, known in Indonesia as jantung pisang (lit. "banana heart"), are also widely used in Indonesian cuisine.

== Statistics ==
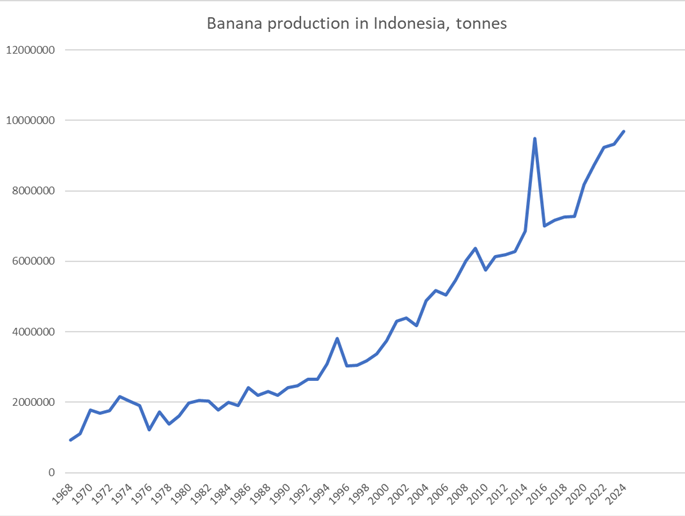
Banana production in Indonesia, 1968–2024.

According to Statistics Indonesia, 9.69 million tonnes of bananas were produced nationwide in 2024, comprising 32 percent of total fruit production and making it the most-produced fruit in the country, with a higher production than the next three most-produced fruits (mangoes, snakefruit, and pineapples) combined. The 2024 harvest is an increase from the 2020s 8.18 million tonnes, and 5.76 million tonnes in 2010. This made Indonesia the world's third-largest producer of bananas, behind China and India.

The Indonesian Ministry of Agriculture reported that there were around 110 million productive banana plants in 2023.

=== Trade ===
Indonesia exported around 20 thousand tonnes of bananas in 2022, worth under US$10 million, primarily to Malaysia, China, and Singapore. The presence of pests in Indonesian bananas – namely fruit flies – was cited as causing difficulties for Indonesian bananas to enter most markets. Poor post-harvest infrastructure also meant that most Indonesian harvested bananas had short shelf lives. Indonesia's 2023 banana exports were valued at just US$7.5 million, compared to tropical fruit exports of US$167 million.
