= Umbu Mehang Kunda Airport =

Umbu Mehang Kunda Airport Bandar Udara Umbu Mehang Kunda
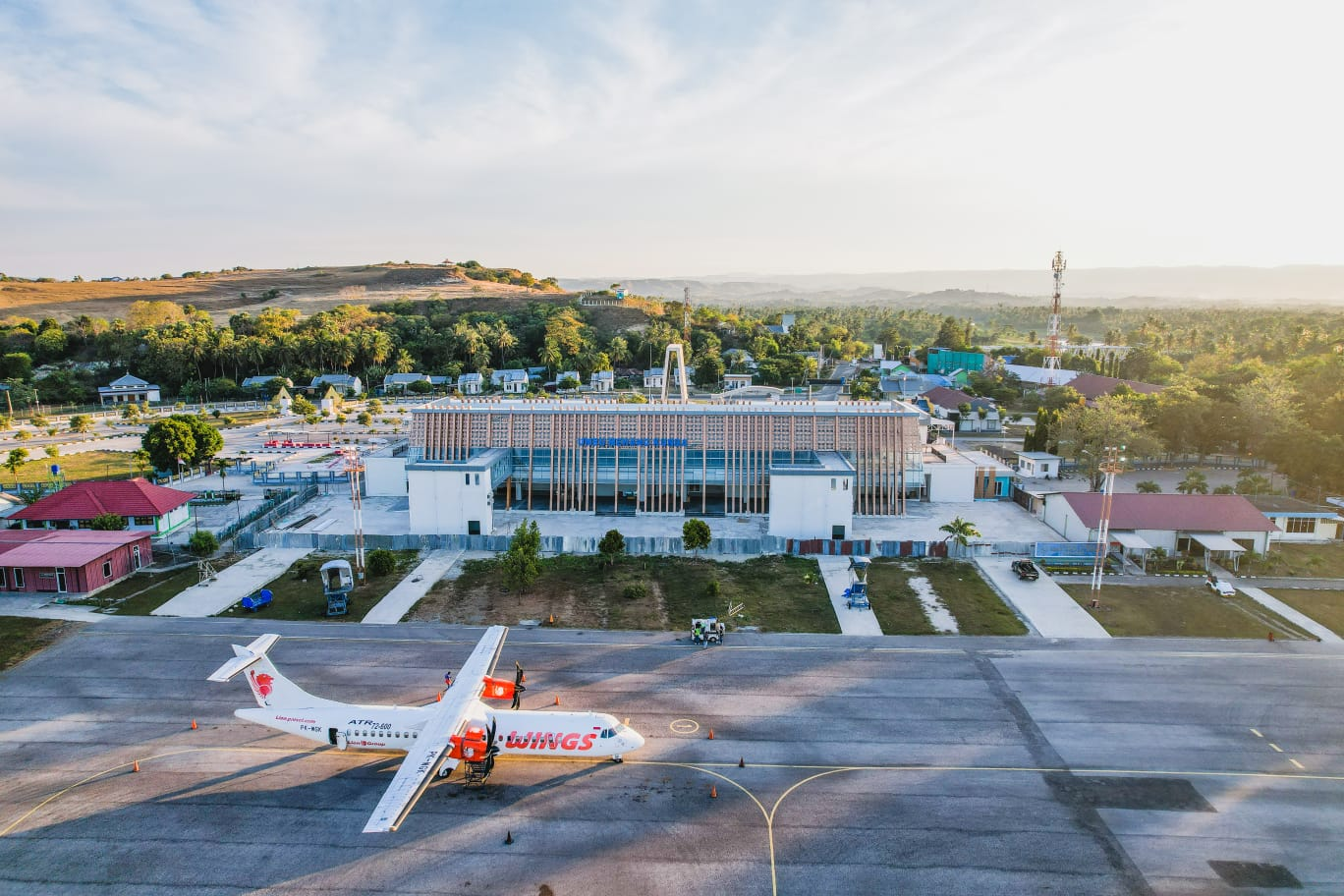
- IATA: WGP; ICAO: WATU

Summary
- Airport type: Public
- Owner: Government of Indonesia
- Operator: Directorate General of Civil Aviation
- Serves: Waingapu
- Location: Waingapu, East Sumba Regency, East Nusa Tenggara, Indonesia
- Time zone: WITA (UTC+08:00)
- Elevation AMSL: 33 ft (10 m)
- Coordinates: 09°40′09″S 120°18′07″E

Map
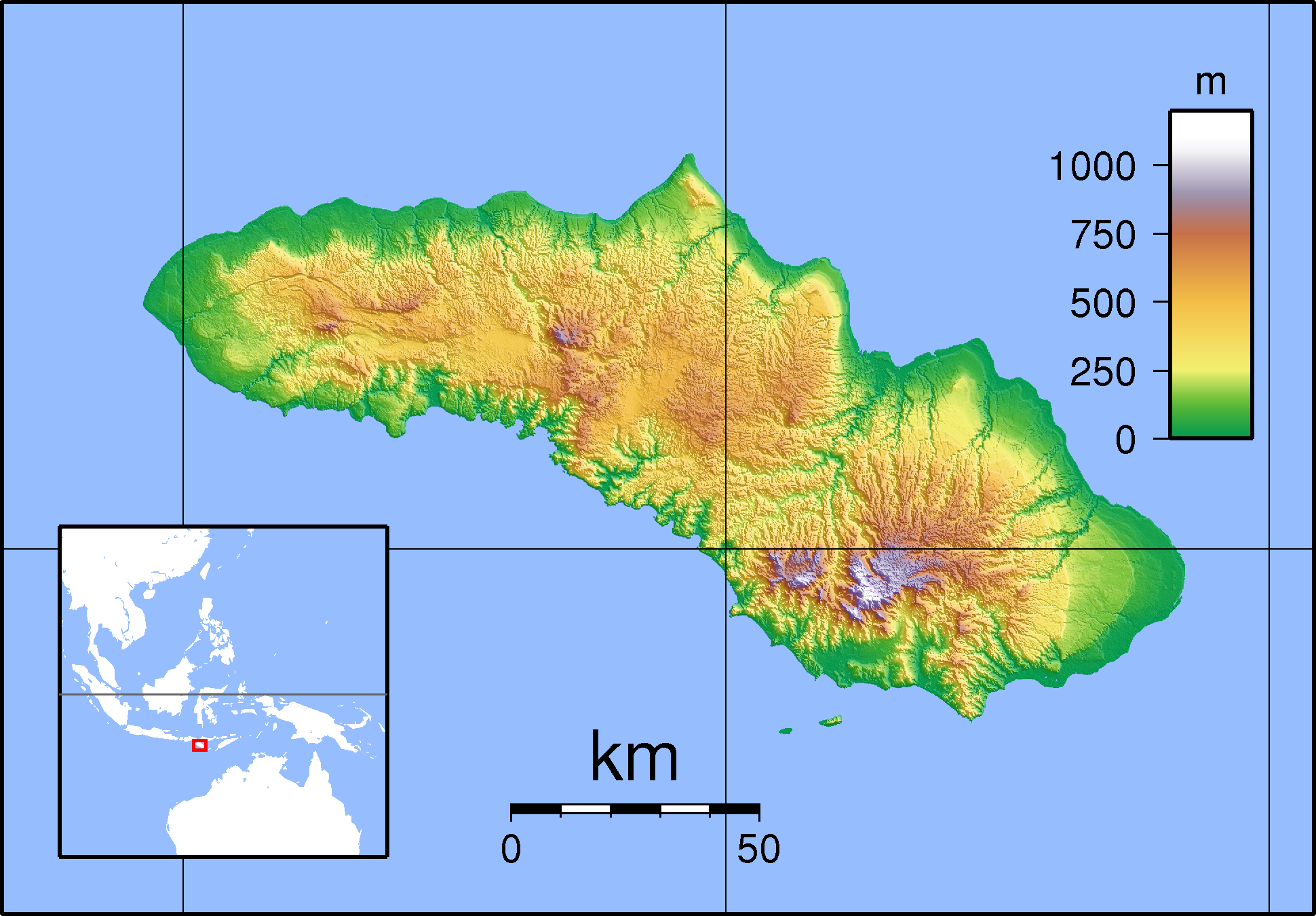
- Location of airport in Sumba

Runways
Direction	Length		Surface
Direction	m	ft	Surface
15/33	1,950	6,398	Asphalt

Statistics (2024)
- Passengers: 58,819 (▼29.27%)
- Cargo (tonnes): 351.40 (▼17.33%)
- Aircraft movements: 1,271 (▼32.72%)
- Source: DGCA

Umbu Mehang Kunda Airport (IATA: WGP, ICAO: WATU), formerly known as Mau Hau Airport, is a domestic airport serving Waingapu, the largest town and administrative seat of East Sumba Regency on the island of Sumba, in East Nusa Tenggara, Indonesia. The airport is named after Umbu Mehang Kunda (1951–2008), a former regent of East Sumba who was known for representing the Sumbanese at the national political level. It is one of only two airports on Sumba, the other being the larger and busier Lede Kalumbang Airport in Tambolaka, Southwest Sumba. Located approximately 4 km (2.5 miles) from Waingapu town center, the airport serves as the main gateway to eastern Sumba. At present, it handles a limited number of domestic flights to nearby destinations within the Lesser Sunda Islands, such as Lombok, Kupang, Labuan Bajo and Savu, as well as to Denpasar, Bali.

== History ==
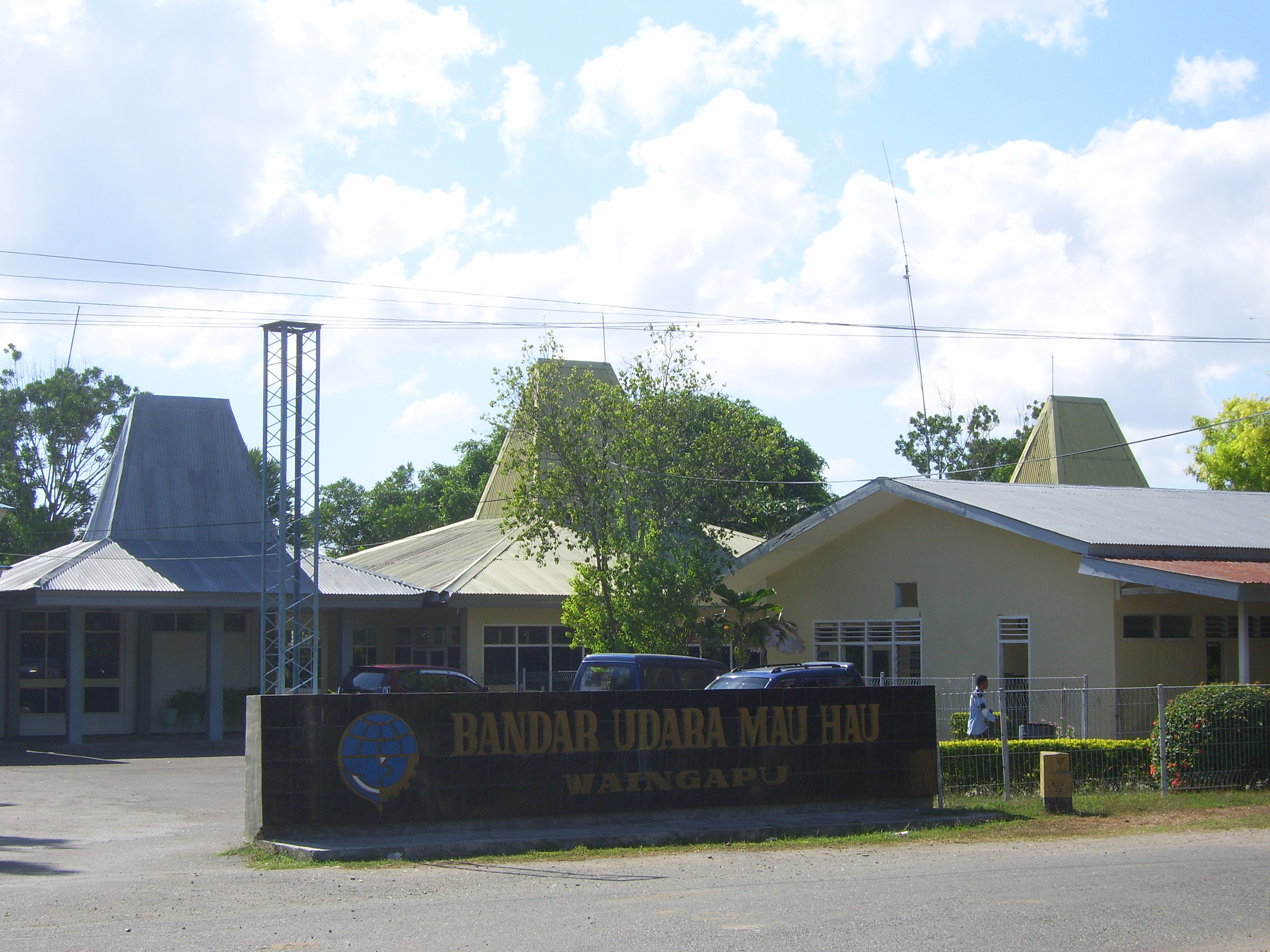
Former terminal of Umbu Mehang Kunda Airport, used until 2016 and since demolished.

The site of present-day Umbu Mehang Kunda Airport was originally a village inhabited by migrants from Savu known as Mau Hawu, from which the airport derived its former name. In 1935, the Dutch East Indies authorities constructed a military airfield at the site for the Royal Netherlands East Indies Air Force. The facility was further upgraded in 1941 for administrative purposes. Following the Japanese invasion of the Dutch East Indies as part of the broader Pacific Theatre of World War II, the airfield was seized in 1942 and repurposed for defense. During the war, it was subsequently used by Japanese forces to support their military operations. The Japanese also established several other airfields across Sumba, including sites at Tulikadu, near Kererebo, and near Weetabula. At the time, a significant Japanese military presence was stationed on Sumba as part of preparations for a planned invasion of mainland Australia. Owing to its relative proximity, the island was considered a strategic staging point. However, these plans were never realized, as Japan capitulated to the Allied forces in August 1945, bringing the war to an end.

Following the war, the airfield was taken over by the Netherlands Indies Civil Administration (NICA) and was subsequently transferred to the Indonesian government in 1949 after the Dutch recognition of Indonesia’s sovereignty. In 1978, the airport began accommodating scheduled pioneer flights following infrastructure upgrades carried out by the Ministry of Transportation. Until the early 2000s, the airport was served by airlines such as Bouraq Indonesia Airlines and Merpati Nusantara Airlines, both of which specialized in pioneer routes, operating flights to and from Kupang and Denpasar using aircraft such as the Hawker Siddeley HS 748 and the Fokker F27, respectively. In 2010, Batavia Air launched flights from Jakarta to Waingapu using a Boeing 737, with stopovers in Surabaya, Denpasar, and Kupang. However, the service was short-lived, as the airline ceased operations in 2013.

Between 2002 and 2005, Mau Hau Airport was placed under the administration of the local government, resulting in the suspension of central government support for air transport development programs. This situation slowed the airport's overall development. In 2006, responsibility for the development of air transportation was transferred back to the Directorate General of Civil Aviation, allowing infrastructure development and rehabilitation at the airport to gradually resume and continue to the present day.

In 2009, the airport was renamed to its current name in honor of Umbu Mehang Kunda, the former Regent of East Sumba who had passed away the previous year, in recognition of his contributions to the development of Sumba.

== Facilities and development ==
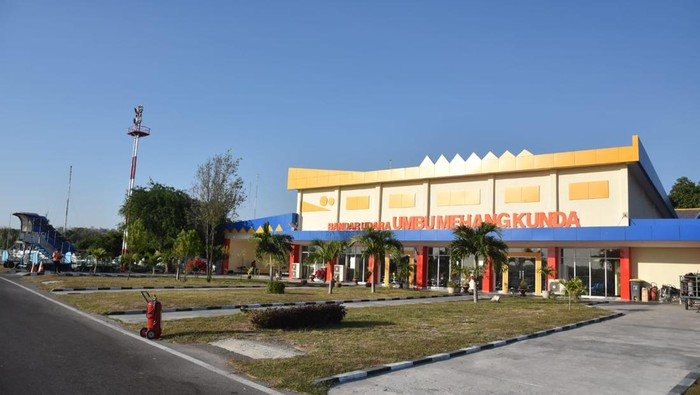
Former terminal of Umbu Mehang Kunda Airport, in operation from 2016 to 2020

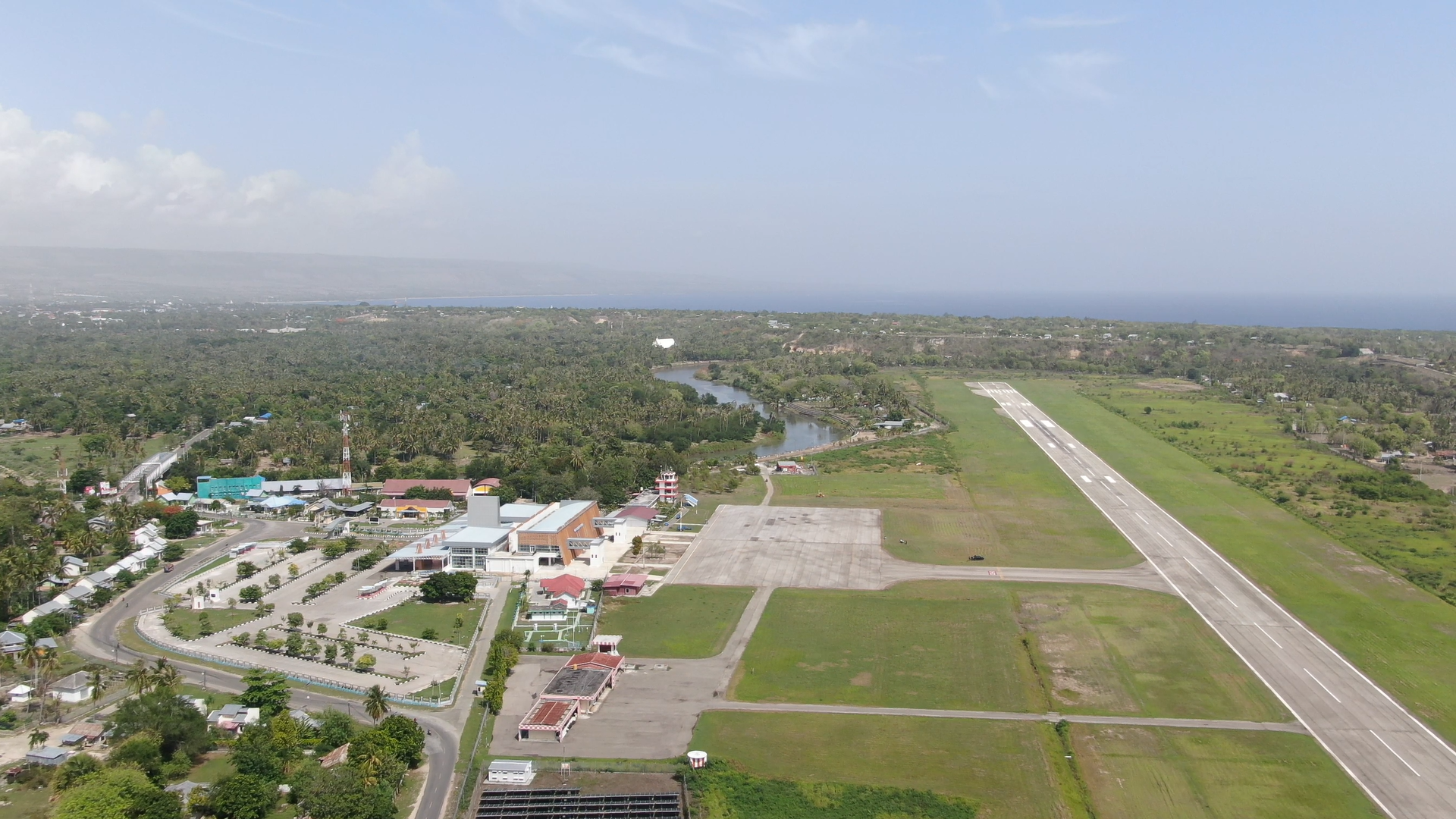
Aerial view of the airport

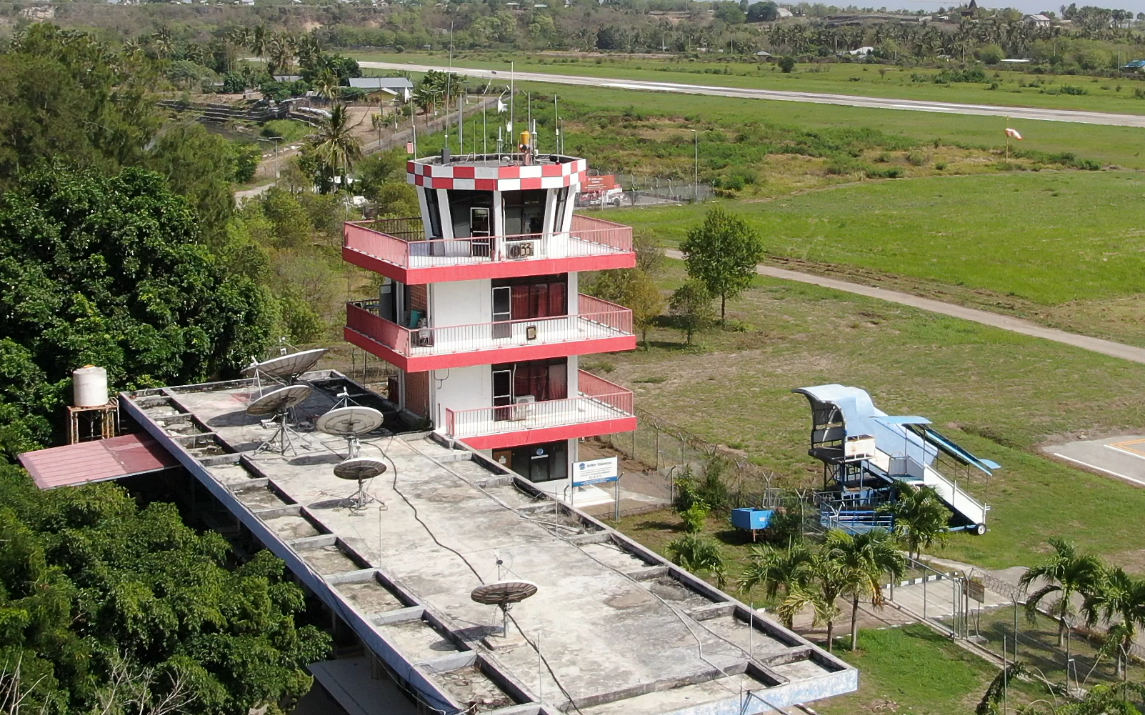
ATC tower

The airport is situated at an elevation of 33 feet (10 m) above mean sea level. It features a single asphalt runway, designated 15/33, measuring 1,950 by 30 metres (6,398 ft × 98 ft). The facility also includes one taxiway, measuring 105 by 30 metres, and a single apron with dimensions of 166 by 88 metres. Due to runway limitations, the airport can only accommodate aircraft up to the size of a Boeing 737-500, and even then, such aircraft cannot operate at full payload capacity.

In 2016, Umbu Mehang Kunda Airport opened a new terminal to enhance passenger services. This terminal was later demolished in 2020 to make way for the construction of a larger, more modern facility. The new terminal was completed and inaugurated in 2023. The project, undertaken by PT Ardi Tekindo Perkasa and funded by the 2022 state budget with IDR 68.3 billion, is poised to serve as the main gateway to East Sumba—and the island of Sumba as a whole—via air travel. The terminal covers an area of 5,600 m² and can accommodate up to 509,600 passengers annually. Combining modern and artistic design with traditional Sumbanese architectural elements, the terminal features a distinctive tower, while the airport entrance is adorned with a ceremonial gate showcasing mamuli, a traditional Sumbanese artifact.

In addition, the airport is equipped with aircraft rescue and firefighting (ARFF) facilities, a VIP terminal covering 202 m^{2}, and an administrative building measuring 450 m^{2}.

== Airlines and destinations ==
Airlines	Destinations
Susi Air	Labuan Bajo, Ruteng, Savu
TransNusa	Denpasar
Wings Air	Kupang, Lombok

== Statistics ==
Annual passenger numbers and aircraft statistics
Year	Passengers handled	Passenger % change	Cargo (tonnes)	Cargo % change	Aircraft movements	Aircraft % change
2006	47,309	Steady	304.35	Steady	1,498	Steady
2007	64,607	▲36.56	202.38	▼33.50	1,460	▼2.54
2008	46,074	▼28.69	209.67	▲3.60	1,250	▼4.38
2009	65,441	▲42.03	300.02	▲43.09	1,110	▼11.20
2010	142,338	▲117.51	975.14	▲225.02	1,318	▲18.74
2011	79,823	▼43.92	269.59	▼72.35	1,415	▲7.36
2012	65,272	▼18.23	204.20	▼24.26	1,152	▼18.59
2013	86,683	▲32.80	353.40	▲73.07	1,940	▲68.40
2014	98,097	▲13.17	467.18	▲32.20	2,236	▲15.26
2015	119,310	▲21.62	454.57	▼2.70	2,334	▲4.38
2016	153,110	▲28.33	451.10	▼0.76	2,956	▲26.65
2017	156,853	▲2.44	537.04	▲19.05	2,952	▼0.14
2018	176,167	▲12.31	496.04	▼7.63	3,378	▲14.43
2019	155,291	▼11.85	469.79	▼5.29	2,912	▼13.80
2020	99,213	▼36.11	339.98	▼27.63	2,383	▼18.17
2021	107,868	▲8.72	374.20	▲10.07	2,740	▲14.98
2022	96,787	▼10.27	375.72	▲0.41	2,175	▼20.62
2023	83,157	▼14.08	425.07	▲13.13	1,889	▼13.15
2024	58,819	▼29.27	351.40	▼17.33	1,271	▼32.72
^{Source: DGCA, BPS}
