= Saleh Bay =

- Teluk Saleh (Indonesian)
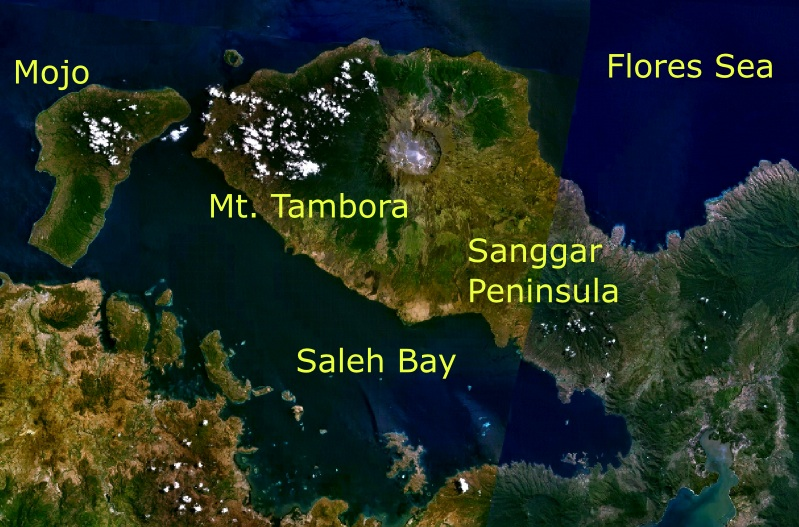
- Saleh Bay in the center of the island of Sumbawa

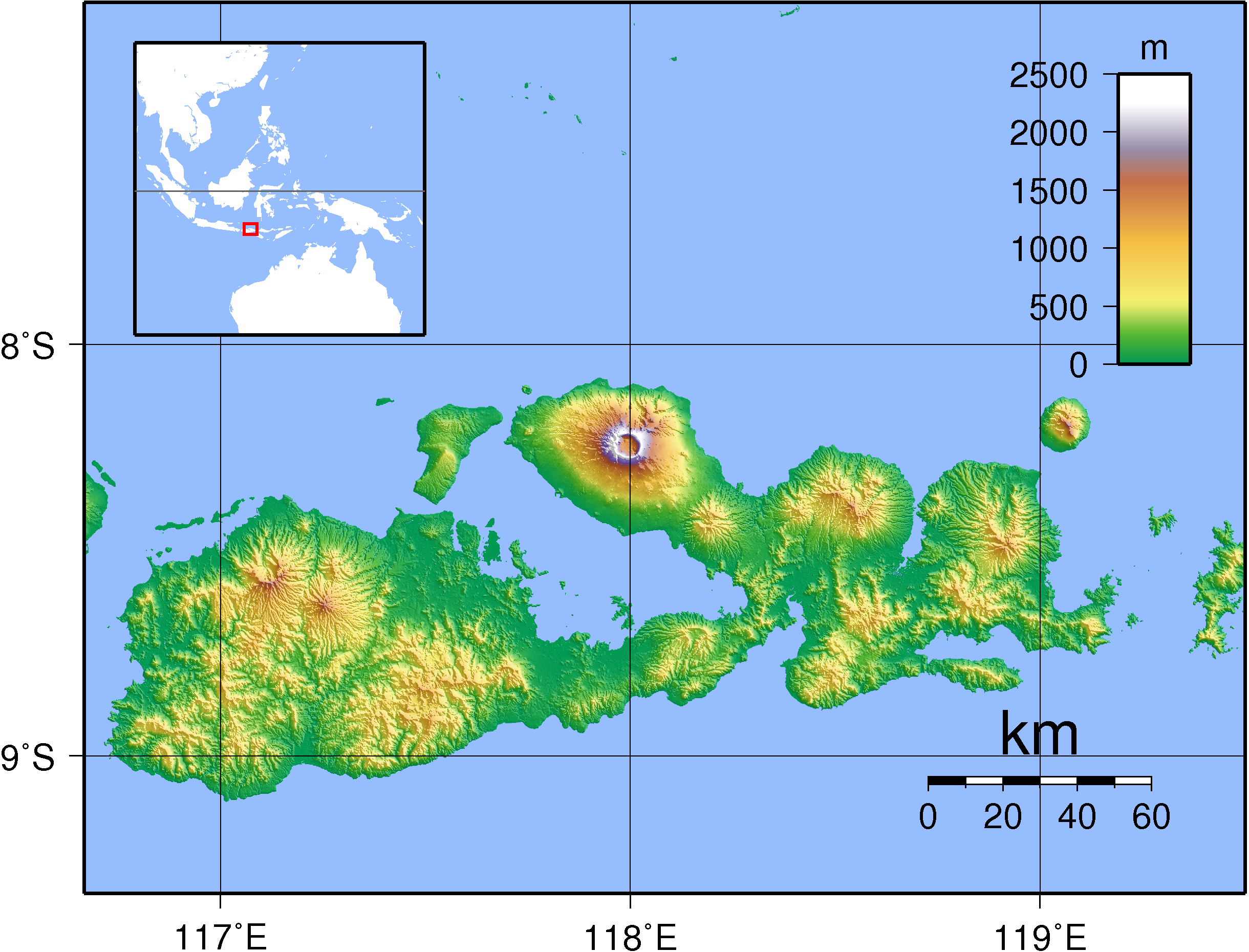
- Location within Sumbawa
- Location: South Asia
- Coordinates: 8°34′00″S 117°57′00″E
- Type: Bay
- Basin countries: Indonesia
- References: Teluk Saleh: Indonesia National Geospatial-Intelligence Agency, Bethesda, MD, USA

Saleh Bay (Indonesian: Teluk Saleh) is the largest bay in the island of Sumbawa, Indonesia, roughly on the north central part. It is semi-enclosed by Moyo Island and the peninsula of Tambora, Sanggar Peninsula. Three larger islands in the bay are Liang Island, Ngali Island, and Rakit Island. Three of the four regencies of Sumbawa border the bay.
