= Nusa Cendana University =

University in Kupang, Indonesia

University of Nusa Cendana
- Universitas Nusa Cendana
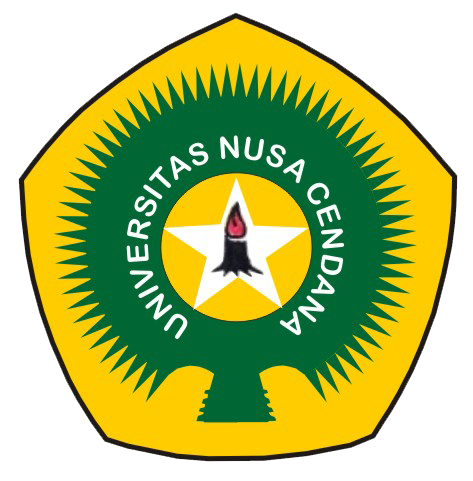
- Type: Public
- Established: 1 September 1962
- Affiliations: ASAIHL
- Rector: Prof. Ir. Fredrik L. Benu, M.Si., Ph.D.
- Students: over 20,000
- Location: Kupang, East Nusa Tenggara, Indonesia; 10.1545227°S 123.6590252°E
- Website: www.undana.ac.id

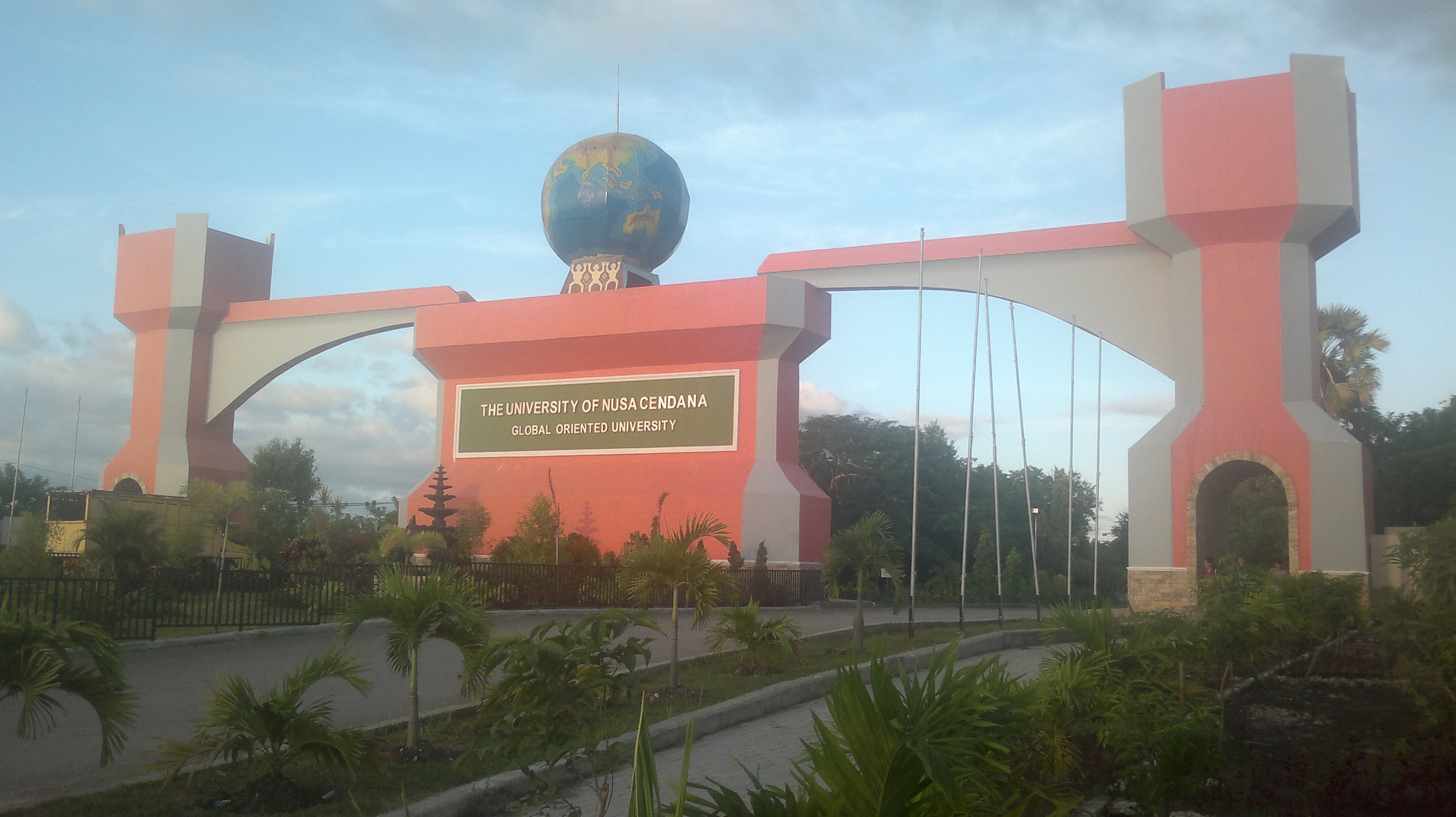
Entrance of Nusa Cendana University

The Nusa Cendana University (Indonesian: Universitas Nusa Cendana, abbreviated Undana) is a public university in Kupang, East Nusa Tenggara, Indonesia. It was established on September 1, 1962. Its rector is Maxs Sanam.

In 2021, the United States Agency for International Development (USAID) and the Ministry of Education, Culture, Research, and Technology (META) launched an initiative to improve digital literacy among Indonesian university students. The five-year initiative focused on five universities in Indonesia, including the Nusa Cendana University. Lecturers were provided with training and resources to teach digital literacy skills to students.

== Schools ==
The university has eight faculties:

- School of Education and Teacher Training
- School of Social and Political Sciences
- School of Animal Science
- School of Law
- School of Agriculture
- School of Community Health
- School of Science and Engineering
- School of Medicine

== Undana Rectors ==
Rectors of Undana NTT:

1. Mohamad Salim (1962-1967),
2. Letkol Elias Tari, better known as El Tari (1967-1968)
3. Soetan Mohamad Sjah (1968-1976),
4. Urias Bait (1976-1977),
5. Frans E. Likadja (1978-1987),
6. Mozes R.Toelihere (1988-1996),
7. August Benu (1996-2005),
8. Frans Umbu Datta (2005-2013)
9. Fredrik Lukas Benu (2013-2021)
10. Maxs U. E. Sanam. (2021-2025)
