= East Sumba Regency =

Regency in East Nusa Tenggara, Indonesia

East Sumba Regency Kabupaten Sumba Timur
- Regency
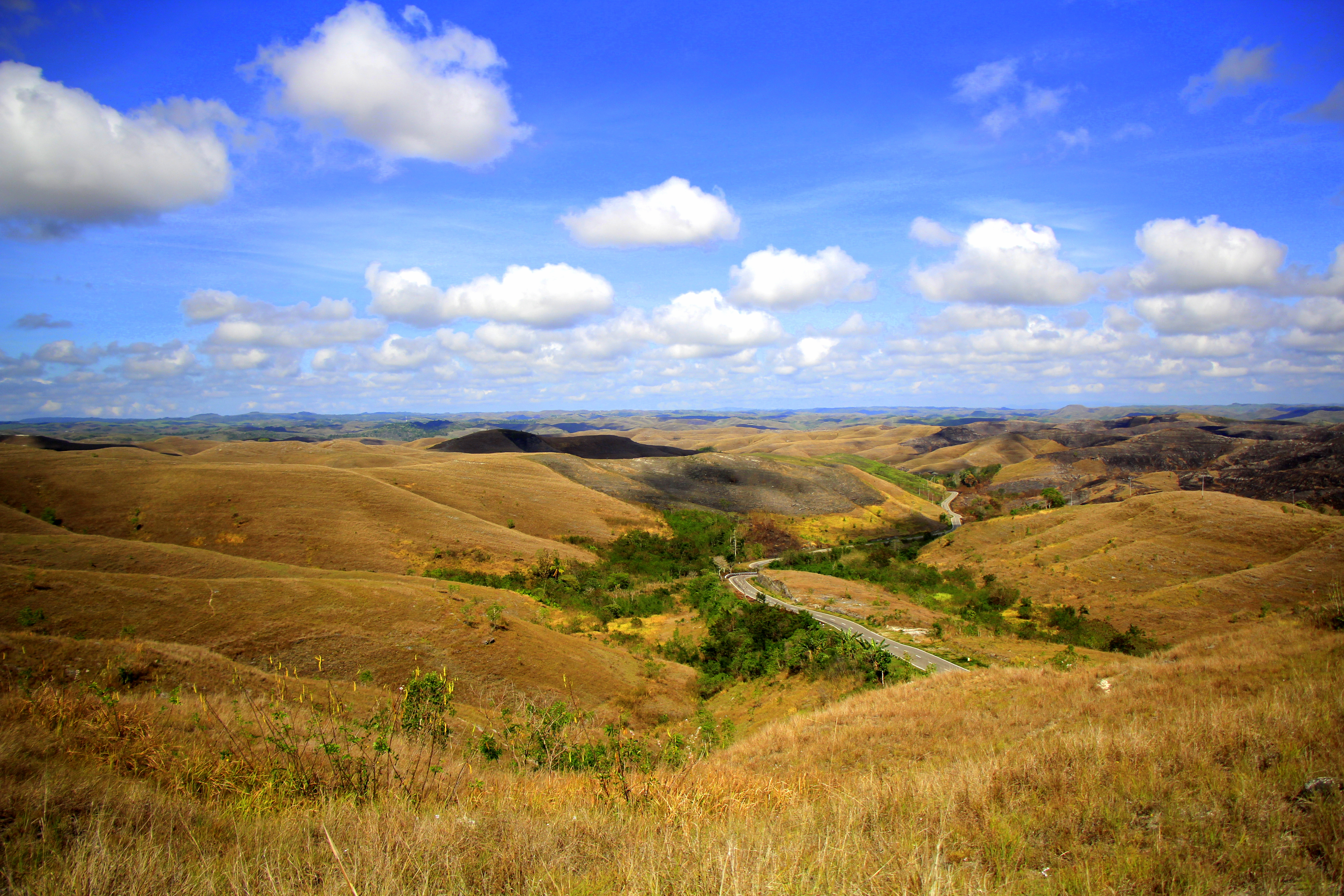
- Warinding Hill

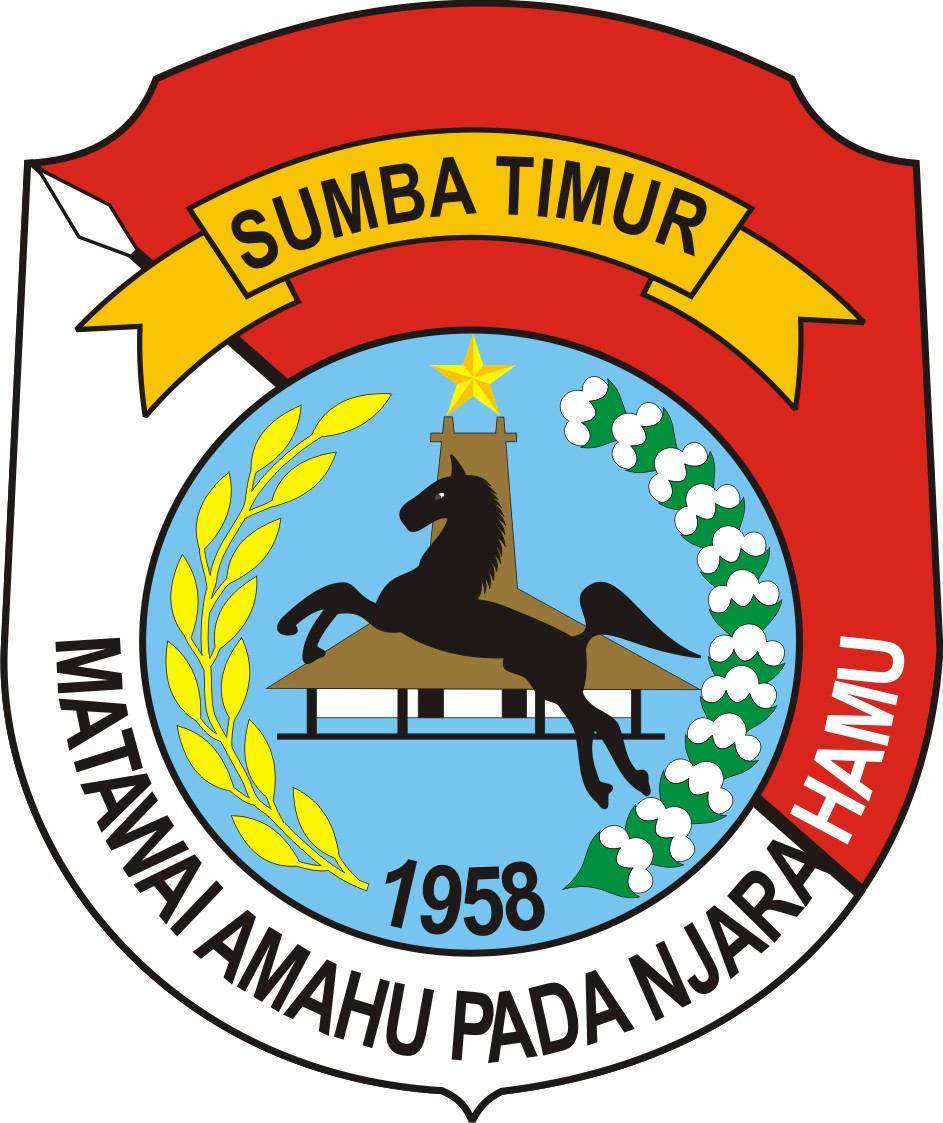
- Coat of arms

- Location within East Nusa Tenggara

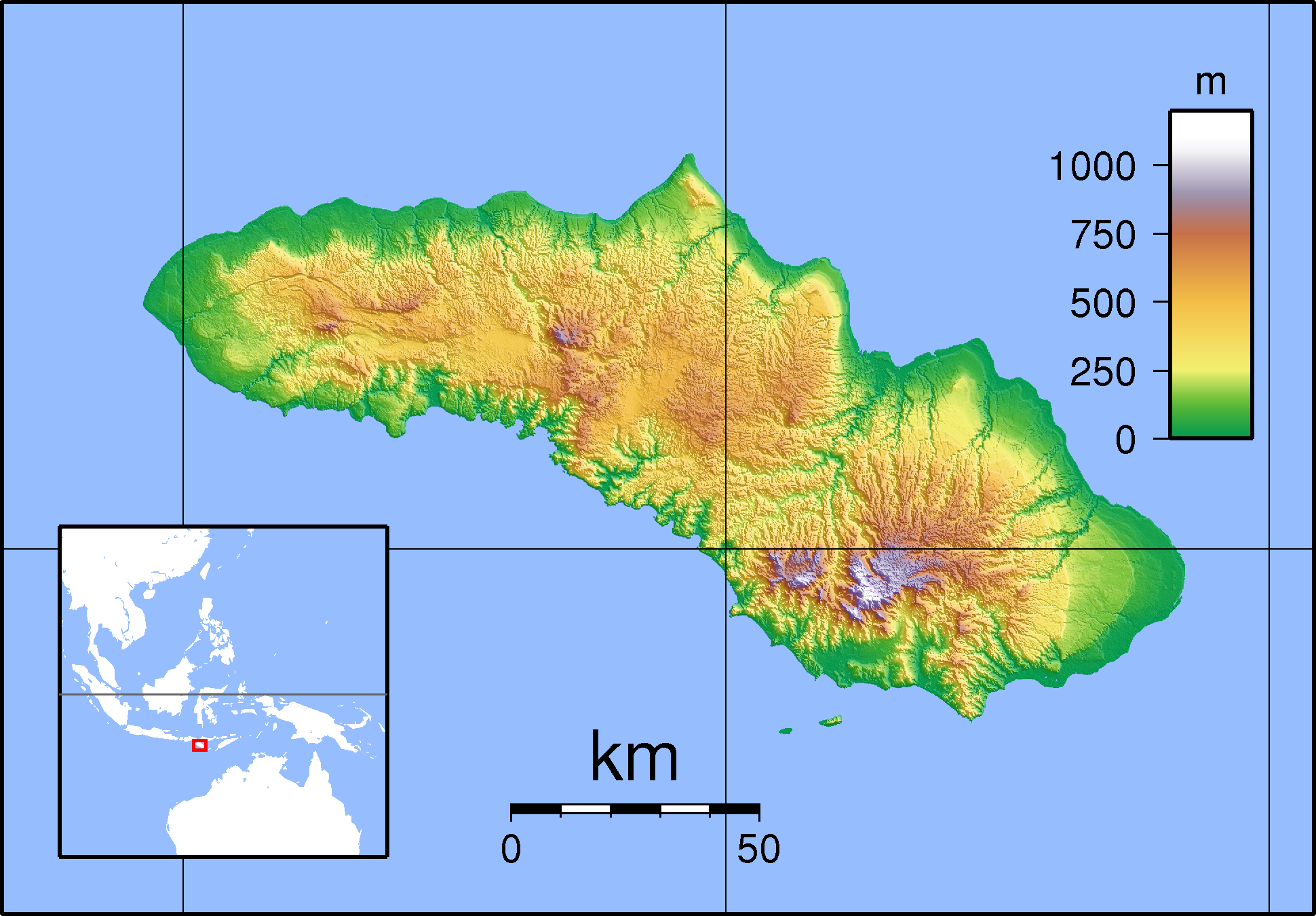
- Location in Sumba, Lesser Sunda Islands and Indonesia East Sumba Regency (Lesser Sunda Islands) East Sumba Regency (Indonesia)
- Coordinates: 9.8833°S 120.2500°E
- Country: Indonesia
- Region: Lesser Sunda Islands
- Province: East Nusa Tenggara
- Capital: Waingapu

Government
  - Regent: Umbu Lili Pekuwali
  - Vice Regent: Yonathan Hani

Area
  - Total: 7,000.5 km^{2} (2,702.9 sq mi)

Population (mid 2025 estimate)
  - Total: 262,975
  - Density: 37.565/km^{2} (97.293/sq mi)
- Time zone: UTC+8 (ICST)
- Area code: (+62) 387
- Website: sumbatimurkab.go.id

East Sumba Regency (Indonesian: Kabupaten Sumba Timur) is, geographically, the largest of the four regencies which divide the island of Sumba, within East Nusa Tenggara Province of Indonesia. It occupies 62% (nearly two-thirds) of the entire island, being much less densely populated than the western third. The town of Waingapu is the capital of East Sumba Regency (its urban area comprises the kecamatan of Kota Waingapu and Kambera). The population of East Sumba Regency was 227,732 at the 2010 Census and 244,820 at the 2020 Census; the official estimate as of mid-2025 was 262,975 (comprising 134,682 males and 128,293 females).

== Administrative districts ==
The East Sumba Regency is composed of twenty-two districts (kecamatan), whose areas (in km^{2}) and populations at the 2010 Census and 2020 Census are listed below, together with the official estimates as of mid-2025. The table also includes the locations of the district headquarters, the number of administrative villages in each district (totaling 140 rural desa and 16 urban kelurahan), and its postal code.

Kode Wilayah	Name of District (kecamatan)	Area in km^{2}	Pop'n Census 2010	Pop'n Census 2020	Pop'n Estimate mid 2025	Admin centre	No. of villages	Post code
53.11.03	Lewa	281.1	15,423	15,404	15,944	Pamati Karata	8 ^{(a)}	87150
53.11.04	Nggaha Oriangu	286.4	8,614	9,611	10,830	Karipidita	8	87155
53.11.18	Lewa Tidahu	322.1	6,129	6,826	7,454	Laikeri	6	87151
53.11.19	Katala Hamu Lingu	453.1	3,699	4,043	4,375	Kombapari	5	87152
53.11.05	Tabundung	514.4	8,301	9,051	9,782	Malahar	10	87160
53.11.06	Pinupahar	246.6	6,410	6,855	7,340	Tawui	6	87161
53.11.12	Paberiwai	199.7	5,619	6,221	6,773	Kananggar	7	87175
53.11.13	Karera ^{(b)}	334.6	7,365	7,668	8,104	Nggongi	7	87172
53.11.15	Matawai La Pawu	405.4	5,786	6,092	6,474	Tanarara	6	87174
53.11.14	Kahaungu Eti	475.1	8,214	8,725	9,311	Kamanggih	9	87171
53.11.22	Mahu	196.6	3,922	4,119	4,372	Wairara	6	87170
53.11.21	Ngadu Ngala	207.9	4,787	5,047	5,367	Praiwitu	5	87172
53.11.10	Pahunga Lodu	349.8	12,247	13,066	13,974	Ngala	8	87182
53.11.11	Wula Waijelu	221.3	6,902	7,636	8,311	Wula	7	87183
53.11.09	Rindi	366.5	9,070	9,628	10,273	Tanaraing	8	87181
53.11.08	Umalulu	307.9	16,251	17,667	19,067	Melolo	10 ^{(c)}	87180
53.11.07	Pandawai	412.6	14,776	17,298	19,350	Kawangu	7 ^{(d)}	87176
53.11.17	Kambata Mapambuhang	412.7	3,434	3,822	4,172	Lukuwingir	8	87171^{(e)}
53.11.01	Kota Waingapu	73.8	35,142	35,856	37,526	Waingapu	7 ^{(f)}	87111 - 87116
53.11.16	Kambera	52.0	31,137	33,466	35,919	Pakukinjara	8 ^{(g)}	87113 - 87116
53.11.02	Haharu	601.5	5,586	6,248	6,837	Rambangaru	10	87153
53.11.20	Kanatang	279.4	8,918	10,271	11,399	Temu	7 ^{(h)}	87154
	Totals	7,000.5	227,732	244,820	262,975	Waingapu	156	

Note: (a) includes the kelurahan of Lewa Paku. (b) includes islands off the south of Sumba Island, the largest being Pulau Halura, Pulau Manggudu and Pulau Koatak. (c) includes the kelurahan of Lumbukore.
(d) includes the 2 kelurahan of Kawangu and Watumbaka. (e) except the desa of Lukuwingir (which has a postcode of 87116).
(f) comprises 4 kelurahan (Hambala, Kamalaputi, Kambajawa and Matawai) and 3 desa (Lukukamaru, Mbatakapidu and Pambotandjara).
(g) comprises 7 kelurahan (Kambaniru, Lai Mbonga, Lambanapu, Malumbi, Mau Hau, Prailiu and Wangga) plus the desa of Kiritana.
(h) includes the kelurahan of Temu.

== Transport ==
=== Airport ===
Umbu Mehang Kunda Airport, formerly known as Mau Hau Airport, is situated east of Waingapu near the mouth of the Kambaniru River. It has a 6,070-ft (1,850 metres) long runway with 98-ft (30 metres) width, which can accommodate Boeing 737-300 aircraft. The airport inaugurated a new terminal in 2016 which has been able to improve the passenger services compared with the previous old terminal.

=== Ferry services ===
Waingapu is connected by ferry services with Bajawa and Ende, both on Flores Island and about 40 km to the north.

== Ecology ==
East Sumba is among the focus areas of the Terumbu Karang Sehat Indonesia coral-reef programme implemented by Konservasi Indonesia.
