= Waingapu =

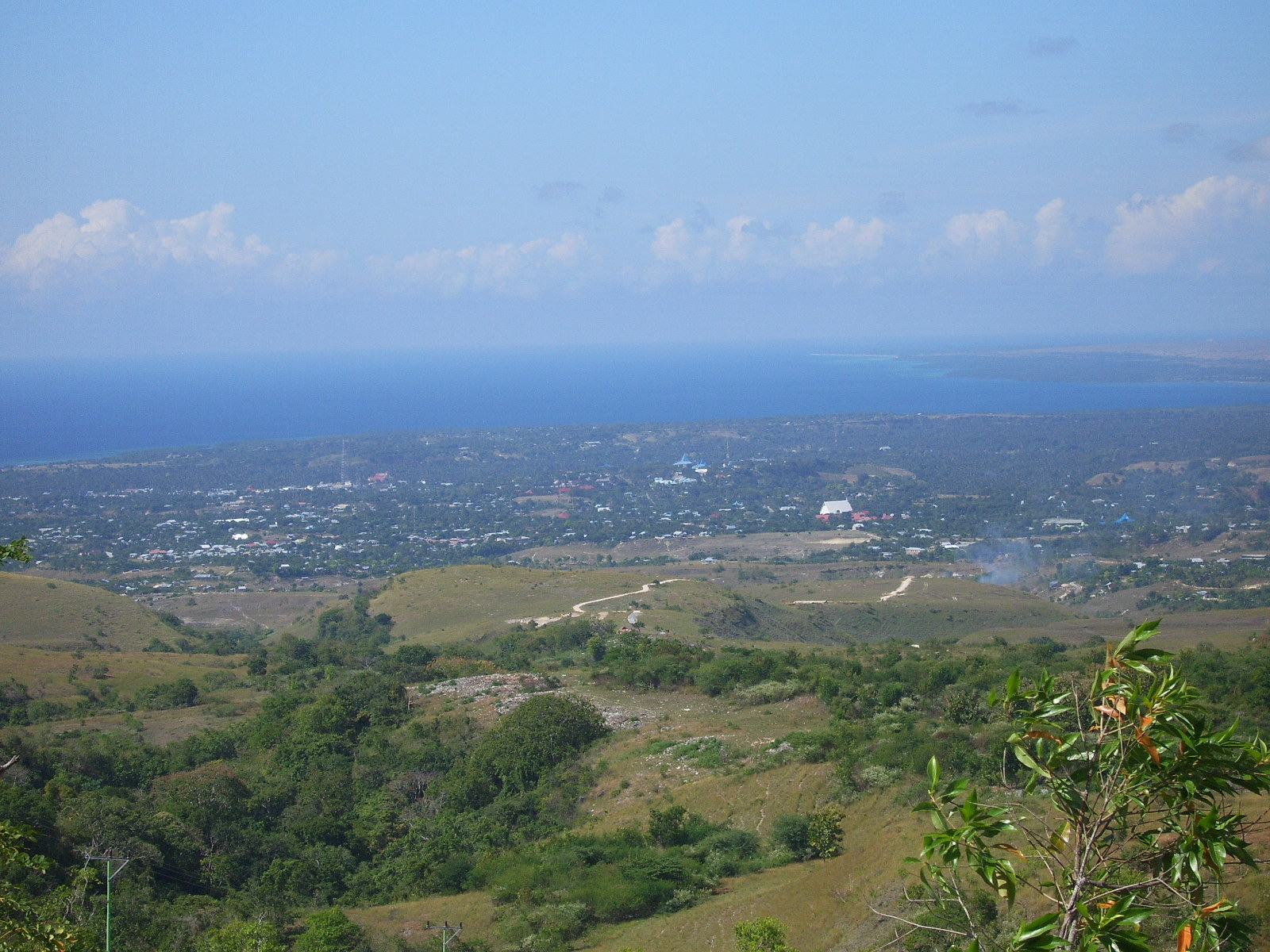
- View of Waingapu, Sumba

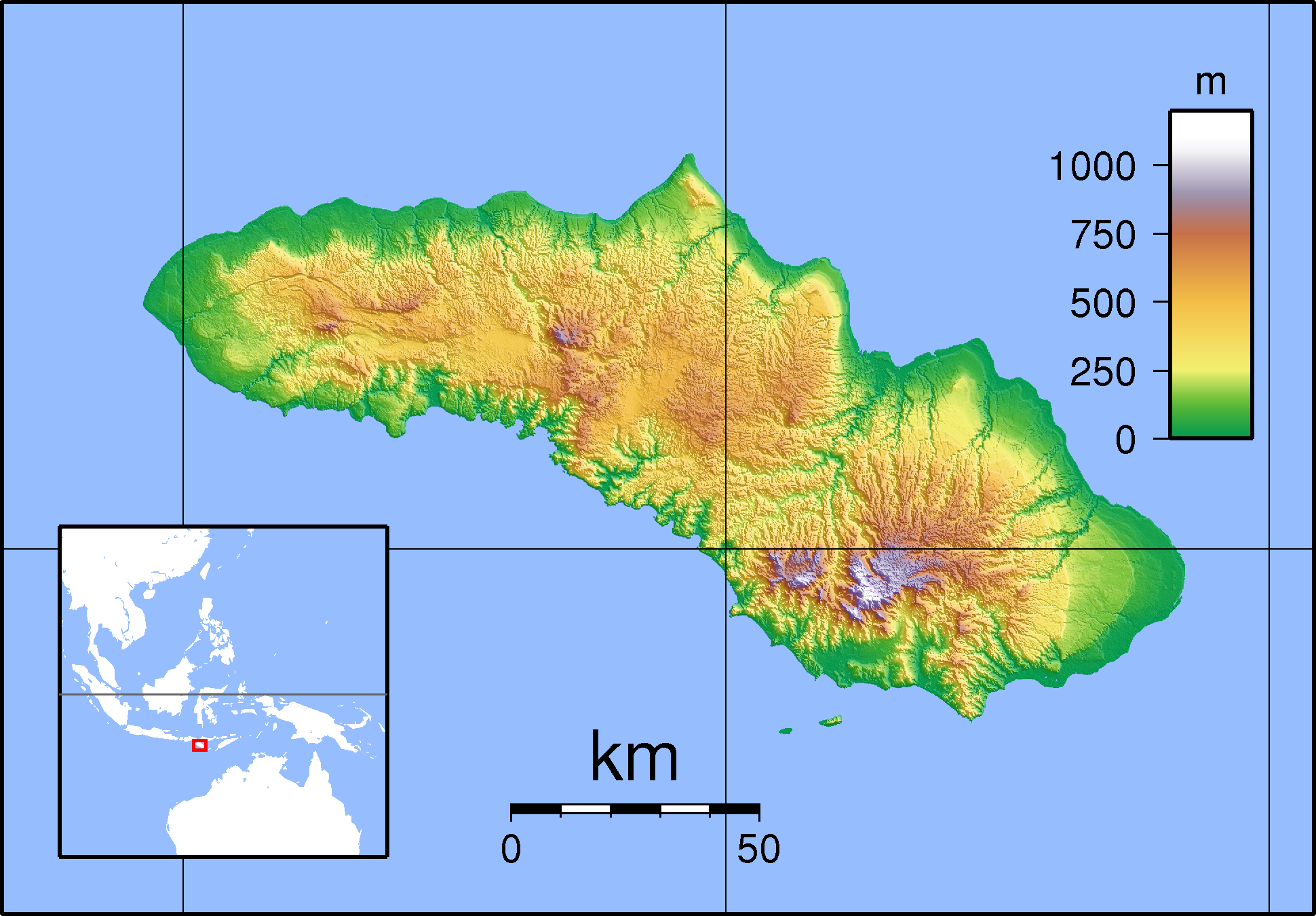
- Location in Indonesia Waingapu (Indonesia)
- Country: Indonesia
- Region: Lesser Sunda Islands
- Province: East Nusa Tenggara
- Regency: East Sumba

Area
  - Total: 125.8 km^{2} (48.6 sq mi)

Population (mid 2025 estimate)
  - Total: 74,637
  - Density: 593.3/km^{2} (1,537/sq mi)
- Time zone: UTC+8 (WITA / UTC)

Waingapu is the largest town in the eastern half of Sumba island, East Nusa Tenggara, Indonesia. It is the capital town of the East Sumba Regency (Sumba Timur).

== History ==
About 5 km south of Waingapu, the prehistorical site of Lambanapu has been dated at around 2,800 BC.

== Transportation ==
=== Aviation ===
East Sumba's Waingapu Airport (IATA: WGP - ICAO: WRRW), officially known as Umbu Mehang Kunda, is located in Waingapu.

=== Maritime ===
The town is served by ferries from nearby islands. The Pelni Company runs two ferries through Waingapu. The KM Awu runs every two weeks on the two-way itinerary Benoa (Bali) – Bima (Sumbawa) – Waingapu – Ende (Flores) – Savu – Rote Island – Kupang (West Timor) – Larantuka (Flores) – Kalabahi (Alor Island). The smaller KM Wilis runs more or less every week on the two-way itinenary Batulicin (Borneo) – Makassar (South Sulawesi) – Labuan Bajo (Flores) – Waikelo (Waitabula, Kota Tambolaka district, Sumba Barat Daya regency) – Waingapu – Ende – Kupang – Kalabahi. Both use the new port (in front of the old port but 7 km by land between the two ports).

The Sabuk Nusantara Company runs various freight and passenger boats linking Waingapu and Waikelo with Sumbawa, Flores and Timor about once a week (n° 79 generally for Waingapu and n° 49 for Waikelo). There is no fixed departure time.

ASDP Indonesia Ferry has small ferries that do not run when the sea gets somewhat rough. It uses the port located 2 km beyond the new port and 9 km from town. Leaving from Waingapu, it does return trips twice a week to Aimere (the port for Ngada Regency, Flores), once a week to Ende, once a week to Savu and three times a week to Kupang.

Waingapu is the only port in the island that can accommodate oil tankers - which often run late.

=== Bus ===
Waingapu is the only town that has two bus stations on its periphery, one in the south and one in the west, each about 5 km out of town. But almost all buses depart from the old “Terminal Kota” in the town center, near the market or on Jalan El Tari; they probably stop by in the bus stations.

== Administrative divisions ==
The town comprises two administrative districts of the regency, sub-divided into 11 urban (kelurahan) and 4 rural (desa) villages. The western part is the administrative Waingapu (town) District, while the eastern part is the separate Kambera District. Their areas and their populations at the 2010 and 2020 Censuses are tabled below, together with the official estimates as at mid 2023.

| Name of District (kecamatan) | Area in km^{2} | Pop'n Census 2010 | Pop'n Census 2020 | Pop'n Estimate mid 2025 |
|---|---|---|---|---|
| Kambera (a) | 52.0 | 31,137 | 33,466 | 37,649 |
| Kota Waingapu (b) | 73.8 | 35,142 | 35,856 | 36,988 |
| Totals | 125.8 | 66,279 | 69,333 | 74,637 |

Notes:

(a) Kambera comprises 7 urban villages (kelurahan) - Kambaniru, Lai Mbonga (Mauliru), Lambanapu, Malumbi, Mau Hau, Prailiu and Wangga - together with one rural village (desa) - Kiritana, in the far south of the district, which is not part of the urban area.
(b) Kota Waingapu comprises 4 urban villages (kelurahan) - Kamalaputi, Hambala, Kambajawa and Matawai - occupying just 10.4% of the area of the district in its northeast corner, plus 3 rural villages (desa) to the south, which are not part of the urban area.

| Kode Wilayah | Name of kelurahan or desa | Area in km^{2} | Pop'n Estimate mid 2023 | Post code |
|---|---|---|---|---|
| 53.11.01.1001 | Kambajawa | 2.7 | 11,288 | 87116 |
| 53.11.01.1002 | Hambala | 2.4 | 8,555 | 87112 |
| 53.11.01.1003 | Matawai | 1.4 | 3,727 | 87116 |
| 53.11.01.1004 | Kamalaputi | 1.2 | 8,565 | 87111 |
| 53.11.01.2012 | Lukukamaru | 21.0 | 853 | 87116 |
| 53.11.01.2013 | Mbatakapidu | 27.2 | 2,232 | 87116 |
| 53.11.01.2014 | Pambolanjara | 17.9 | 2,429 | 87116 |
| 53.11.01 | Totals; Kota Waingapu; District | 73.8 | 37.649 | |

| Kode Wilayah | Name of kelurahan or desa | Area in km^{2} | Pop'n Estimate mid 2025 | Post code |
|---|---|---|---|---|
| 53.11.16.1001 | Wangga | 4.1 | 7,303 | 87116 |
| 53.11.16.1002 | Prailiu | 5.3 | 7,731 | 87113 |
| 53.11.16.1003 | Kambaniru | 1.9 | 7,584 | 87114 |
| 53.11.16.1004 | Mauliru | 5.8 | 5,100 | 87116 |
| 53.11.16.1005 | Mauhau | 1.4 | 2,167 | 87116 |
| 53.11.16.1006 | Malumbi | 11.2 | 2,375 | 87116 |
| 53.11.16.1007 | Lambanapu | 6.9 | 3,647 | 87115 |
| 53.11.16.2008 | Kiritana | 15.4 | 1,081 | 87114 |
| 53.11.16 | Totals; Kambera; District | 52.0 | 36,988 | |

Without the rural desa to the south, the urban area alone (i.e. the 11 kelurahan) covers an area of 44.3 km^{2} and had a combined population of 68,042 in 2025.

== Climate ==
Waingapu has a tropical savanna climate (Köppen: Aw), bordering a hot semi-arid climate (BSh). with relatively cooler dry season and hotter wet season. It has high humidity year round. It is amongst the driest places in Indonesia with only 900 millimetres (35 in) of rain yearly.

Climate data for Waingapu (1991–2020 normals)
| Month | Jan | Feb | Mar | Apr | May | Jun | Jul | Aug | Sep | Oct | Nov | Dec | Year |
|---|---|---|---|---|---|---|---|---|---|---|---|---|---|
| Mean daily maximum °C (°F) | 32.1 (89.8) | 31.9 (89.4) | 32.2 (90.0) | 32.4 (90.3) | 31.9 (89.4) | 31.1 (88.0) | 30.8 (87.4) | 31.0 (87.8) | 32.1 (89.8) | 33.1 (91.6) | 33.4 (92.1) | 32.9 (91.2) | 32.1 (89.7) |
| Daily mean °C (°F) | 27.5 (81.5) | 27.3 (81.1) | 27.4 (81.3) | 27.4 (81.3) | 26.8 (80.2) | 25.9 (78.6) | 25.5 (77.9) | 25.5 (77.9) | 26.5 (79.7) | 28.0 (82.4) | 28.6 (83.5) | 27.9 (82.2) | 27.0 (80.6) |
| Mean daily minimum °C (°F) | 24.4 (75.9) | 23.9 (75.0) | 23.8 (74.8) | 23.4 (74.1) | 23.0 (73.4) | 21.6 (70.9) | 20.9 (69.6) | 20.6 (69.1) | 21.6 (70.9) | 23.4 (74.1) | 24.4 (75.9) | 24.5 (76.1) | 23.0 (73.3) |
| Average rainfall mm (inches) | 173.3 (6.82) | 192.2 (7.57) | 162.1 (6.38) | 97.8 (3.85) | 35.3 (1.39) | 10.3 (0.41) | 5.4 (0.21) | 1.2 (0.05) | 4.9 (0.19) | 13.5 (0.53) | 60.4 (2.38) | 149.8 (5.90) | 906.2 (35.68) |
| Average rainy days (≥ 1.0 mm) | 14.4 | 15.0 | 12.5 | 7.3 | 2.7 | 1.2 | 0.7 | 0.3 | 0.5 | 1.3 | 4.6 | 10.9 | 71.4 |
Source: Starlings Roost Weather
