= Mayor of Kupang =

- Wali Kota Kupang
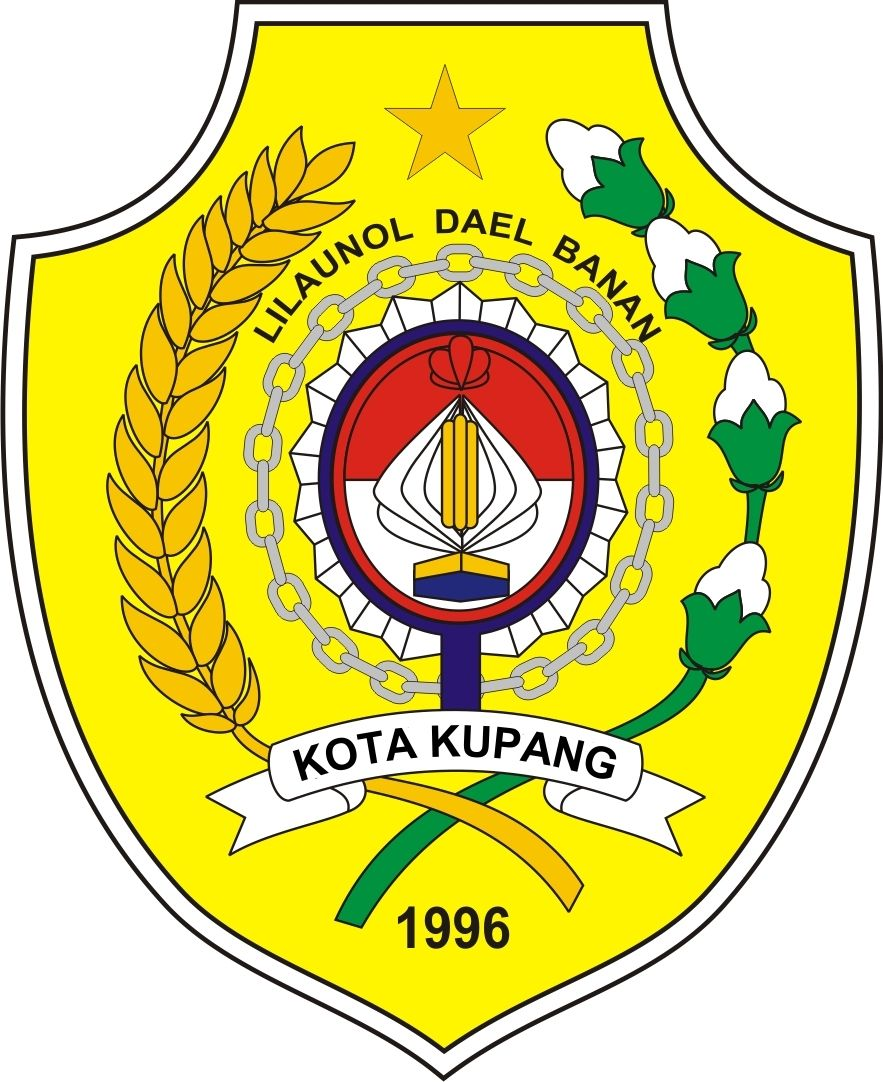
- Coat of arms of Kupang

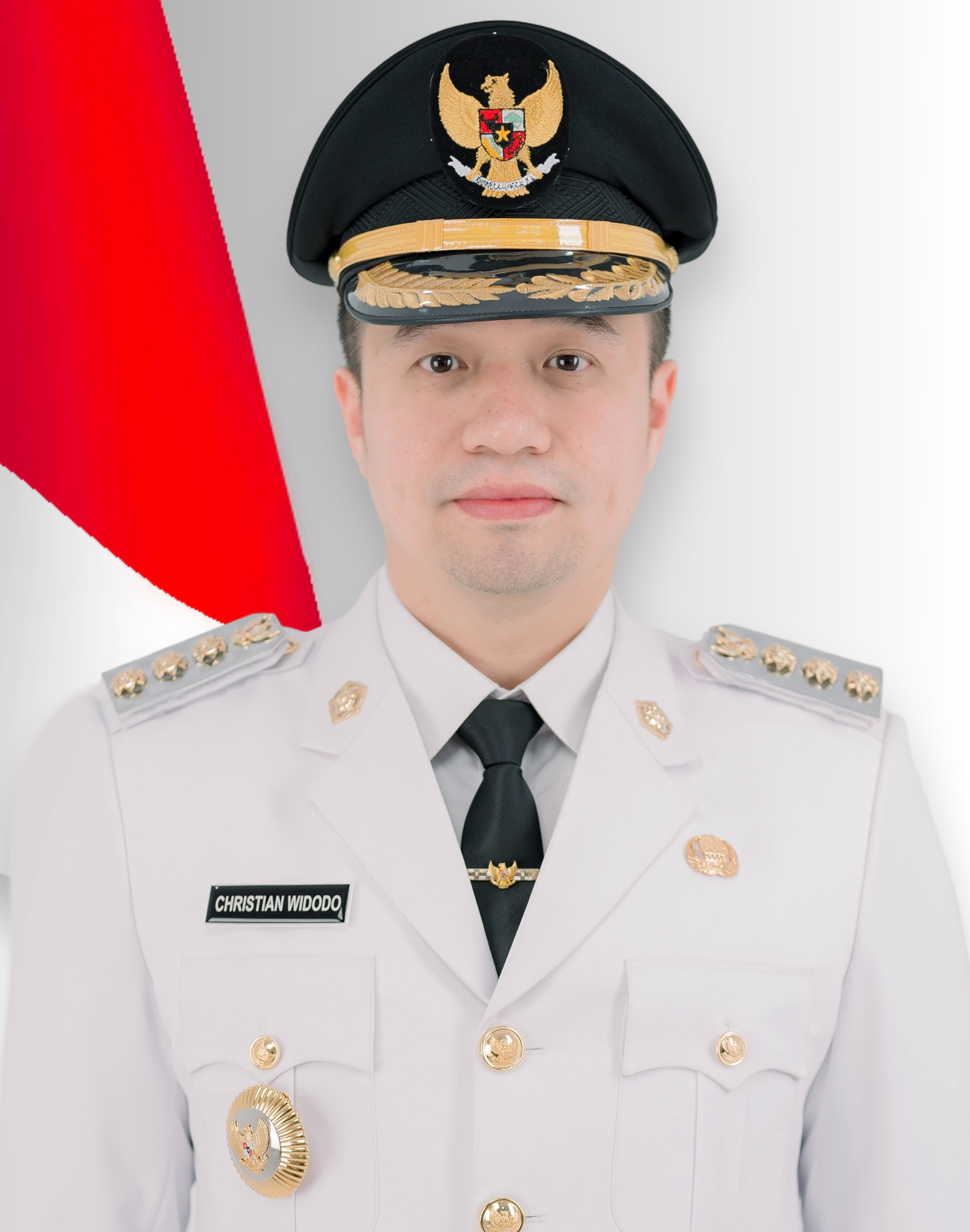
- Incumbent; Christian Widodo since 20 February 2025
- Term length: 5 years
- Inaugural holder: Mesakh Amalo
- Formation: September 18, 1978; 47 years ago
- Website: Official website

Mayor of Kupang is the head of the second-level region who holds the government in Kupang together with the Vice Mayor and 40 members of the Kupang City Regional House of Representatives. The mayor and vice mayor of Kupang are elected through general elections held every 5 years. The first mayor of Kupang was Mesakh Amalo, who governed the city period from 1978 to 1986.

Before becoming an autonomous city, Kupang was an administrative city and was part of Kupang Regency.

== List ==
The following is a list of the names of the Mayors of Kupang from time to time.

Administrative Mayor of Kupang
Num.	Portrait	Mayor	Beginning of office	End of Term	Political Party / Faction	Period	Note.	Vice mayor
1		Mesakh "Adibu" Amalo	18 September 1978	25 May 1986	Independent	1		N/A
2		Samuel Kristian Lerik	26 May 1986	24 April 1996	Independent	2		N/A
Mayor of Kupang
(2)		Samuel Kristian Lerik	23 April 1997	22 April 2002	Golkar	3		N/A
(2)		Samuel Kristian Lerik	6 July 2002	5 July 2007	Golkar	4		Daniel Adoe
3		Daniel "Dan" Adoe	1 August 2007	31 July 2012	Golkar	5 (2007)	(Note: The first Mayor of Kupang to be directly elected by the people of Kupang City.)	Daniel D. Hurek
4		Jonas Salean	1 August 2012	31 July 2017	Golkar	6 (2012)	(Note: From 26 October 2016 to 11 February 2017, Mayor Jonas Salean and Vice Mayor Hermanus Man were on campaign leave, so the wheels of government were run by Acting Officer Mayor Johanna Lisapaly.)	Hermanus Man
5		Jefirstson Richset Riwu Kore	22 August 2017	21 August 2022	Demokrat	7 (2017)		Hermanus Man
6		Christian Widodo	20 February 2025	Incumbent	PSI	8 (2024)		Serena Cosgrova Franscies

== Temporary replacement ==
In the government stack, a regional head who submits himself to leave or temporarily resigns from his position to the central government, then the Minister of Home Affairs prepares a replacement who is a bureaucrat in the regional government or even a vice mayor, including when the mayor's position is in a transition period.

Portrait	Mayor	Party	Beginning	End	Duration	Period	Definitive	Ref.
	Samuel Kristian Lerik (Acting)	Independent	25 April 1996	22 April 1997	362 days	–	Transition (1996–1997)	(Note: Previously served as the Administrative Mayor of Kupang.)
	Samuel Kristian Lerik (Acting)	Independent	23 April 2002	5 July 2002	73 days	–	Transition (2002)	(Note: He was elected mayor for a second term. However, his inauguration was postponed due to alleged bribery in the election process. He was temporarily appointed acting mayor.)
	Pieter Alexander Tallo (Acting)	Independent	6 July 2007	31 July 2007	25 days	–	Transition (2007)	(Note: Governor of East Nusa Tenggara)
nirbing	Yoseph Aman Mamulak (Daily executive)	Independent	6 July 2007	31 July 2007	25 days	–	Transition (2007)	(Note: Assistant for Governance at the Regional Secretariat of East Nusa Tenggara Province. Immediately after assuming the position of Acting Mayor, Piet Tallo appointed Yos Mamulak as Acting Mayor.)
nirbing	Johanna Engeline Lisapaly (Acting Officer)	Independent	26 October 2016	11 February 2017	108 days	6 (2012)	Jonas Salean	(Note: First assistant of the East Nusa Tenggara Regional Secretariat was appointed as acting head in connection with the permanent obstacles experienced by the Mayor and Vice Mayor due to being on campaign leave.)
nirbing	Bernadus Benu (Daily executive)	Independent	1 August 2017	21 August 2017	20 days	–	Transition (2017)	
nirbing	George Melkianus Hadjoh (Acting)	Independent	22 August 2022	22 August 2023	1 year, 0 days	–	Transition (2022–2025)	
nirbing	Fahrensy Priestly Funay (Acting)	Independent	22 August 2023	23 August 2024	1 year, 1 day	–	Transition (2022–2025)	
nirbing	Linus Lusi (Acting)	Independent	24 August 2024	20 February 2025	180 days	–	Transition (2022–2025)	

== See also ==
- Kupang
- List of incumbent regional heads and deputy regional heads in East Nusa Tenggara
