= 2018 East Nusa Tenggara gubernatorial election =

Local election in Indonesia

- 27 June 2018
- Turnout: 73.9%
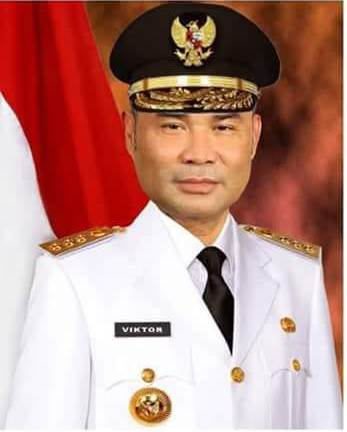

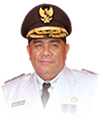

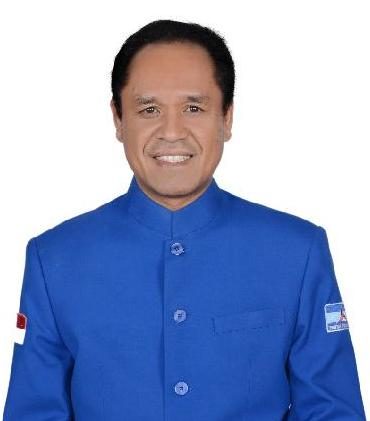
Nominee	Viktor Laiskodat	Marianus Sae
Party	NasDem	PDI-P
Running mate	Josef Nae Soi	Emelia J. Nomleni
Popular vote	838,213	603,822
Percentage	35.60%	25.64%
Nominee	Esthon Foenay	Benny Harman
Party	Gerindra	Demokrat
Running mate	Christian Rotok	Benny A. Litelnoni
Popular vote	469,025	443,796
Percentage	19.92%	18.85%
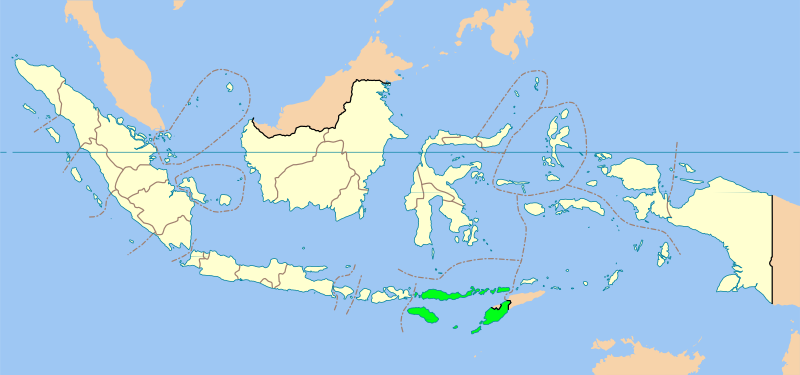
- Location of East Nusa Tenggara within Indonesia
Governor before election
Frans Lebu Raya
PDI-P
Elected Governor
Viktor Laiskodat
Nasdem

The 2018 East Nusa Tenggara gubernatorial election took place on 27 June 2018 as part of the simultaneous local elections. It was held to elect the governor of East Nusa Tenggara along with their deputy, whilst members of the provincial council (Dewan Perwakilan Rakyat Daerah) will be re-elected in 2019.

With incumbent Frans Lebu Raya meeting his term limits, People's Representative Council member Viktor Laiskodat came ahead in the four-candidate race, defeating former deputy governor Esthon Foenay alongside Ngada Regency leader Marianus Sae and fellow legislator Benediktus Kabur Harman.

== Timeline ==
On 29 April 2018, the province's electoral commission declared that there would be 3,177,562 eligible voters in the province, who were to vote in 9,671 polling stations.

Registration for party-backed candidates were opened between 8 and 10 January 2018, while independent candidates were required to register between 22 and 26 November 2017. The numerical order of the candidates were determined on 13 February through a lottery. The campaigning period happened between 15 February and 24 June, with a three-day election silence before voting on 27 June.

== Candidates ==
#	Candidate	Position	Running mate	Parties
1	Esthon Foenay	Vice-governor of East Nusa Tenggara (2008-2013)	Christian Rotok	Gerindra; PAN; Total: 13 seats
2	Marianus Sae	Regent of Ngada	Emmilia Nomleni	PDI-P; PKB; Total: 15 seats
3	Benediktus Kabur Harman	Member of People's Representative Council	Benny A Litelnoni	Demokrat; PKPI; PKS; Total: 13 seats
4	Viktor Laiskodat	Member of People's Representative Council	Joseph Sae Noi	Nasdem; Golkar; Hanura; Total: 24 seats

An independent candidate pair attempted to run for the election, but failed to collect the needed 272,300 identity cards.

Eshton Foenay had run in the 2003 gubernatorial election, but lost. Later, he became Frans Lebu Raya's deputy between 2008 and 2013. His running mate Christian Rotok is a two-term regent of Manggarai.

Marianus Sae, the regent of Ngada, had been arrested as a suspect for a corruption case by the Corruption Eradication Commission, resulting in him not attending the candidate lottery on 13 February. His running mate Emmilia Nomleni is a provincial councilor from PDI-P between 2009 and 2014.

Benediktus Kabur Harman, or Benny Harman, is a member of the People's Representative Council, while his running mate Benny Alexander Litelnoni was the incumbent vice-governor.

Viktor Laiskodat, also a member of the national parliament, headed the Nasdem faction in the People's Representative Council, with his running mate Josef Adreanus Nae Soi being a former national legislator serving from 2004 to 2014.

== Results ==
No	Candidate	Votes	%
1	Esthon/Christian	469,025	19.92
2	Marianus/Emmilia	603,822	25.64
3	Benny/Benny	443,796	18.85
4	Viktor/Joseph	838,213	35.60
Total votes		2,354,856	
Invalid votes		47,550	
Turnout		2,402,406	73.80
Source: KPU

The Viktor/Joseph pair was victorious in 15 territories (regencies or cities), with Marianus/Emmilia winning in 4, Esthon/Christian winning in 2, and Benny/Benny in just one.
