= 2024 East Nusa Tenggara gubernatorial election =

- 27 November 2024
- Turnout: 68.85% (▼4.66pp)
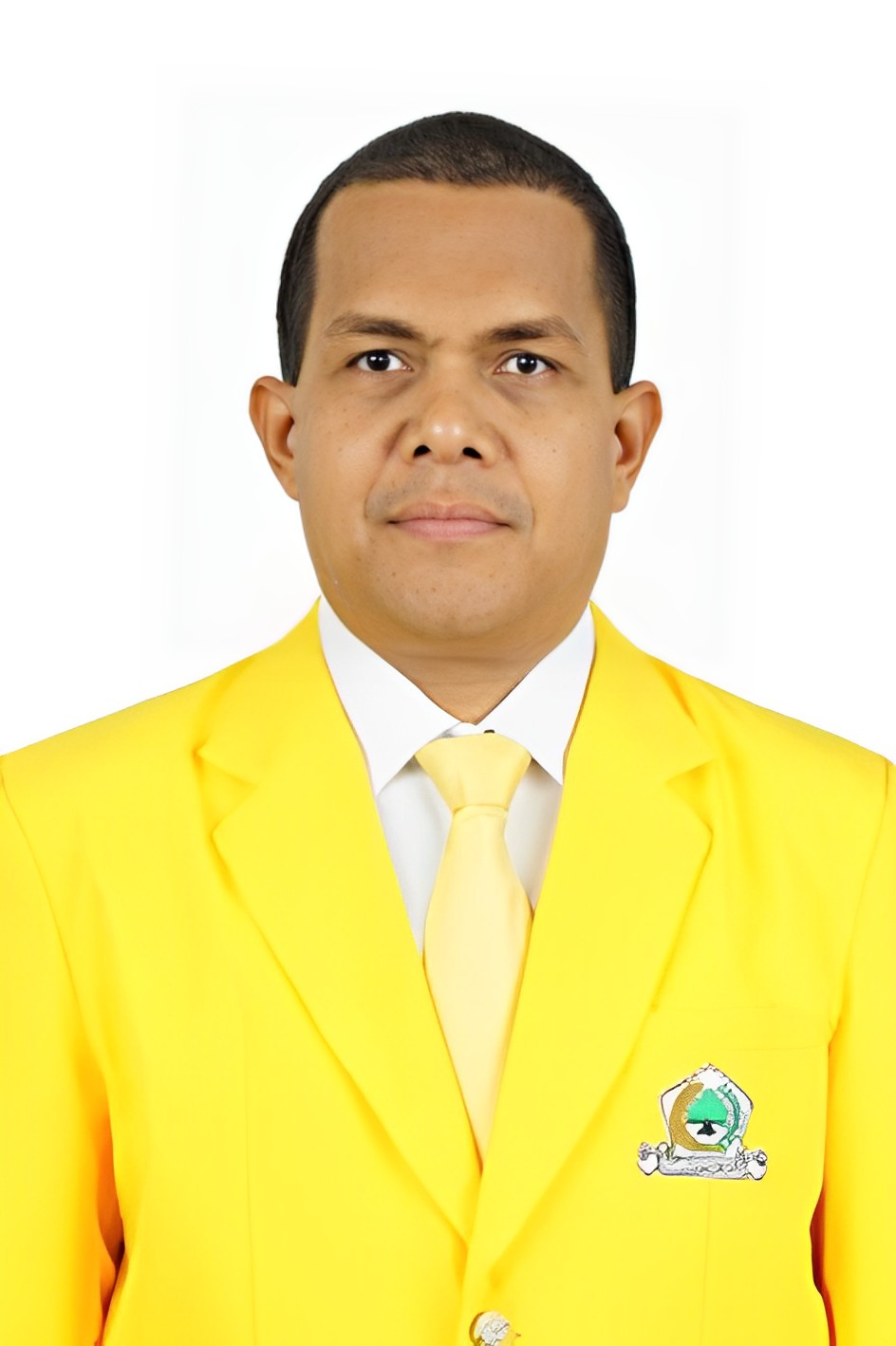

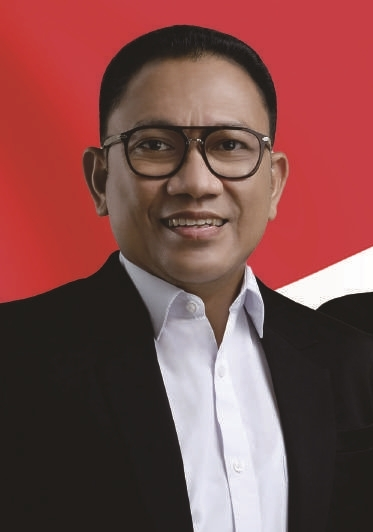

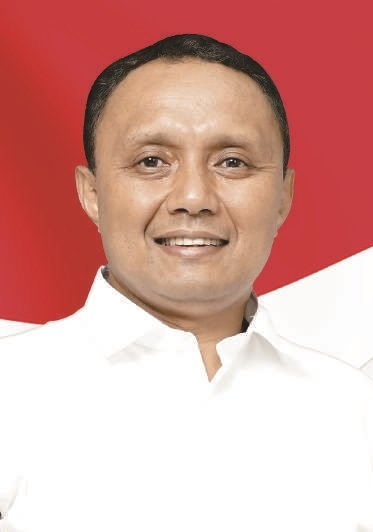
| Candidate | Emanuel Melkiades Laka Lena | Yohanis Fransiskus Lema | Simon Petrus Kamlasi |
| Party | Golkar | PDI-P | NasDem |
| Alliance | KIM Plus | – | – |
| Running mate | Johanis Asadoma | Jane Natalia Suryanto | Adrianus Garu |
| Popular vote | 1,004,055 | 873,524 | 812,353 |
| Percentage | 37.33% | 32.47% | 30.20% |
- Results map by district
Governor before election
Andriko Noto Susanto (acting)
Independent
Elected Governor
Emanuel Melkiades Laka Lena
Golkar

The 2024 East Nusa Tenggara gubernatorial election was held on 27 November 2024 as part of nationwide local elections to elect the governor of East Nusa Tenggara for a five-year term. The previous election was held in 2018. The election was won by Emanuel Melkiades Laka Lena of Golkar with 37% of the vote. Yohanis Fransiskus Lema of the Indonesian Democratic Party Struggle (PDI-P) received 32%. The NasDem Party's Simon Petrus Kamlasi placed third with 30%.

== Electoral system ==
The election, like other local elections in 2024, follow the first-past-the-post system where the candidate with the most votes wins the election, even if they do not win a majority. It is possible for a candidate to run uncontested, in which case the candidate is still required to win a majority of votes "against" an "empty box" option. Should the candidate fail to do so, the election will be repeated on a later date.

== Candidates ==
According to electoral regulations, in order to qualify for the election, candidates are required to secure support from a political party or a coalition of parties controlling 13 seats (20 percent of all seats) in the East Nusa Tenggara Regional House of Representatives (DPRD). As no parties won 13 or more seats in the 2024 legislative election, coalitions must be formed in order to nominate a candidate. However, following a Constitutional Court of Indonesia decision in August 2024, the political support required to nominate a candidate was lowered to between 6.5 and 10 percent of the popular vote. Candidates may alternatively demonstrate support to run as an independent in form of photocopies of identity cards, which in East Nusa Tenggara's case corresponds to 340,721 copies. No independent candidates registered with the General Elections Commission (KPU) by the set deadline.

The previous governor, Viktor Laiskodat, is eligible to contest the election, but had publicly stated that he will not be seeking reelection.

=== Potential ===
The following are individuals who have either been publicly mentioned as a potential candidate by a political party in the DPRD, publicly declared their candidacy with press coverage, or considered as a potential candidate by media outlets:

- Emilia Julia Nomleni (PDI-P), speaker of the East Nusa Tenggara DPRD and chairman of PDI-P's East Nusa Tenggara branch.
- Johny Asadoma (Gerindra), former chief of the East Nusa Tenggara provincial police department.
- Fransiskus Roberto Diogo, former regent of Sikka (2018–2023).
- Emanuel Melkiades Laka Lena (Golkar), member of the House of Representatives, chairman of Golkar's East Nusa Tenggara branch.
- Simon Petrus Kamlasi, Indonesian army general, former chief of staff of the East Nusa Tenggara military area.

=== Declined ===
The following are individuals who have either been publicly mentioned as a candidate or considered so by media outlets, but publicly announced to not run for this election:

- Viktor Laiskodat (NasDem), incumbent governor of East Nusa Tenggara.

== Political map ==
Following the 2024 Indonesian legislative election, eleven political parties are represented in the East Nusa Tenggara DPRD:

| Political parties | Seat count |
|---|---|
| Indonesian Democratic Party of Struggle (PDI-P) | 9 / 65 |
| Party of Functional Groups (Golkar) | 9 / 65 |
| Great Indonesia Movement Party (Gerindra) | 9 / 65 |
| NasDem Party | 8 / 65 |
| National Awakening Party (PKB) | 7 / 65 |
| Democratic Party (Demokrat) | 7 / 65 |
| Indonesian Solidarity Party (PSI) | 6 / 65 |
| National Mandate Party (PAN) | 4 / 65 |
| People's Conscience Party (Hanura) | 4 / 65 |
| Prosperous Justice Party (PKS) | 1 / 65 |
| Perindo Party | 1 / 65 |

== Results ==
| Candidate | Running mate | Party | Votes | % |
|---|---|---|---|---|
| Emanuel Melkiades Laka Lena | Johanis Asadoma | Golkar | 1,004,055 | 37.33 |
| Yohanis Fransiskus Lema | Jane Natalia Suryanto | Indonesian Democratic Party of Struggle | 873,524 | 32.47 |
| Simon Petrus Kamlasi | Adrianus Garu | NasDem Party | 812,353 | 30.20 |
| Total | | | 2,689,932 | 100.00 |
| Valid votes | | | 2,689,932 | 97.96 |
| Invalid votes | | | 56,018 | 2.04 |
| Total votes | | | 2,745,950 | 100.00 |
| Registered voters/turnout | | | 3,988,372 | 68.85 |
Source: KPU Nusa Tenggara Timur

Candidate vote share by district
Ansy–Jane

Melkiades–Johni

Simon–Adrianus
