= List of incumbent regional heads and deputy regional heads in East Nusa Tenggara =

The following is an article about the list of Regional Heads and Deputy Regional Heads in 22 regencies/cities in East Nusa Tenggara who are currently still serving.

== List ==
Regency/ City	Photo of the Regent/ Mayor	Regent/ Mayor	Photo of Deputy Regent/ Mayor	Deputy Regent/ Mayor	Taking Office	End of Office (Planned)	Ref.
Alor; Regency List of Regents/Deputy Regents		Iskandar Lakamau		Rocky Winaryo	20 February 2025	20 February 2030	
Belu; Regency List of Regents/Deputy Regents		Willybrodus Lay		Vicente Hornai Gonsalves	24 March 2025	24 March 2030	
Ende; Regency List of Regents/Deputy Regents		Yosef Benediktus Badeoda		Dominikus Minggu Mere	20 February 2025	20 February 2030	
East Flores; Regency List of Regents/Deputy Regents		Antonius Doni Dihen		Ignasius Boli	20 February 2025	20 February 2030	
Kupang; Regency List of Regents/Deputy Regents		Yosef Lede		Aurum Obe Titu Eki	20 February 2025	20 February 2030	
Lembata; Regency List of Regents/Deputy Regents		Petrus Kanisius Tuaq		Muhamad Nasir	20 February 2025	20 February 2030	
Malaka; Regency List of Regents/Deputy Regents		Stefanus Bria Seran		Henri Melki Simu	20 February 2025	20 February 2030	
Manggarai; Regency List of Regents/Deputy Regents		Herybertus G.L. Nabit		Fabianus Abu	20 February 2025	20 February 2030	
West Manggarai; Regency List of Regents/Deputy Regents		Edistasius Endi		Yulianus Weng	20 February 2025	20 February 2030	
East Manggarai; Regency List of Regents/Deputy Regents		Agas Andreas		Tarsisius Sjukur	20 February 2025	20 February 2030	
Nagekeo; Regency List of Regents/Deputy Regents		Simplisius Donatus		Gonzalo Gratianus Muga Sada	20 February 2025	20 February 2030	
Ngada; Regency List of Regents/Deputy Regents		Raymundus Bena		Bernadinus Dhey Ngebu	20 February 2025	20 February 2030	
Rote Ndao; Regency List of Regents/Deputy Regents		Paulus Henuk		Apremoi Dudelusy Dethan	20 February 2025	20 February 2030	
Sabu Raijua; Regency List of Regents/Deputy Regents		Krisman Bernard Riwu Kore		Thobias Uly	20 February 2025	20 February 2030	
Sikka; Regency List of Regents/Deputy Regents		Juventus Prima Yoris Kago		Simon Subandi Supriadi	20 February 2025	20 February 2030	
West Sumba; Regency List of Regents/Deputy Regents		Yohanis Dade		Thimotius Tede Ragga	20 February 2025	20 February 2030	
Southwest Sumba; Regency List of Regents/Deputy Regents		Ratu Ngadu Bonu Wulla		Dominikus Alphawan Rangga Kaka	20 February 2025	20 February 2030	
Central Sumba; Regency List of Regents/Deputy Regents		Paulus Sekayu Karugu Limu		Marthinus Umbu Djoka	20 February 2025	20 February 2030	
East Sumba; Regency List of Regents/Deputy Regents		Umbu Lili Pekuwali		Yonathan Hani	20 February 2025	20 February 2030	
South Central Timor; Regency List of Regents/Deputy Regents		Eduard Markus Lioe		Johny Army Konay	20 February 2025	20 February 2030	
North Central Timor; Regency List of Regents/Deputy Regents		Yosep Falentinus Delasalle Kebo		Kamillus Elu	20 February 2025	20 February 2030	
Kupang; City List of Mayors/Deputy mayors		Christian Widodo		Serena Cosgrova Franscies	20 February 2025	20 February 2030	

Notes

- "Commencement of office" is the inauguration date at the beginning or during the current term of office. For acting regents/mayors, it is the date of appointment or extension as acting regent/mayor.
- Based on the Constitutional Court decision Number 27/PUU-XXII/2024, the Governor and Deputy Governor, Regent and Deputy Regent, and Mayor and Deputy Mayor elected in 2020 shall serve until the inauguration of the Governor and Deputy Governor, Regent and Deputy Regent, and Mayor and Deputy Mayor elected in the 2024 national simultaneous elections as long as the term of office does not exceed 5 (five) years.

== See also ==
- East Nusa Tenggara
