= 2024 Kupang mayoral election =

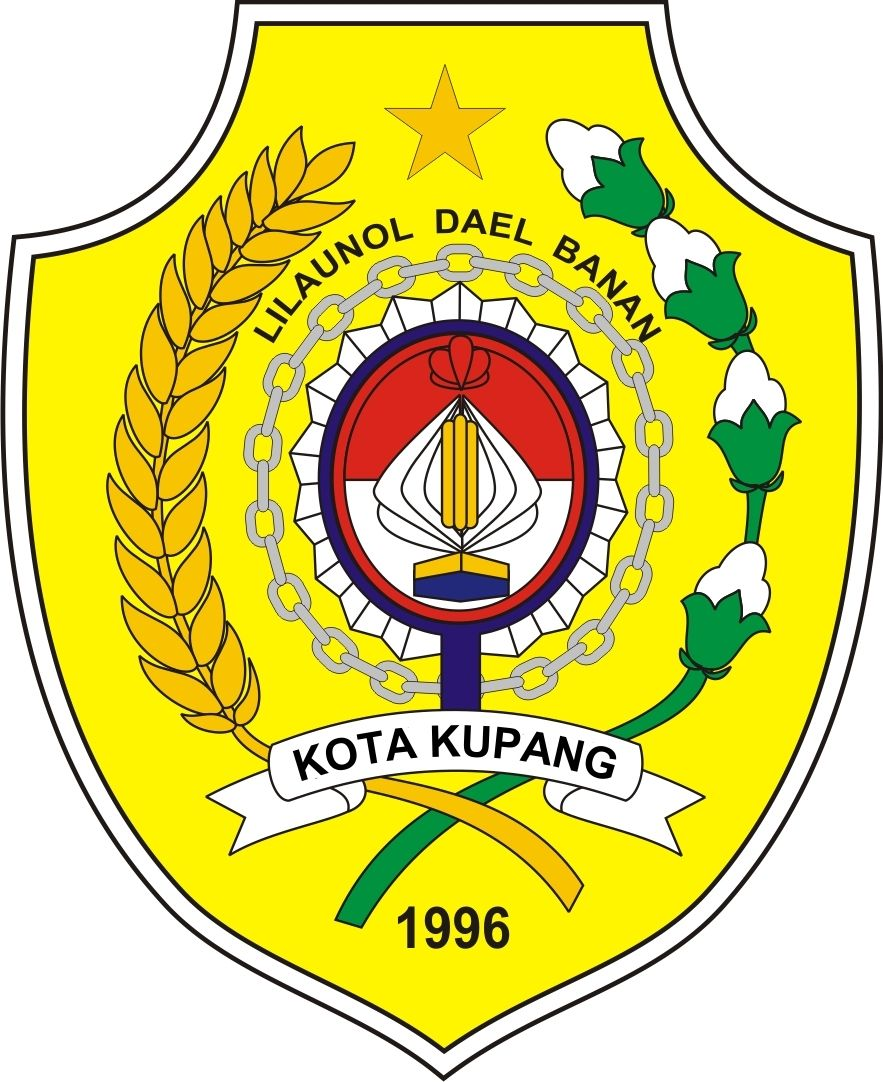
- 27 November 2024
- Turnout: 70.07%
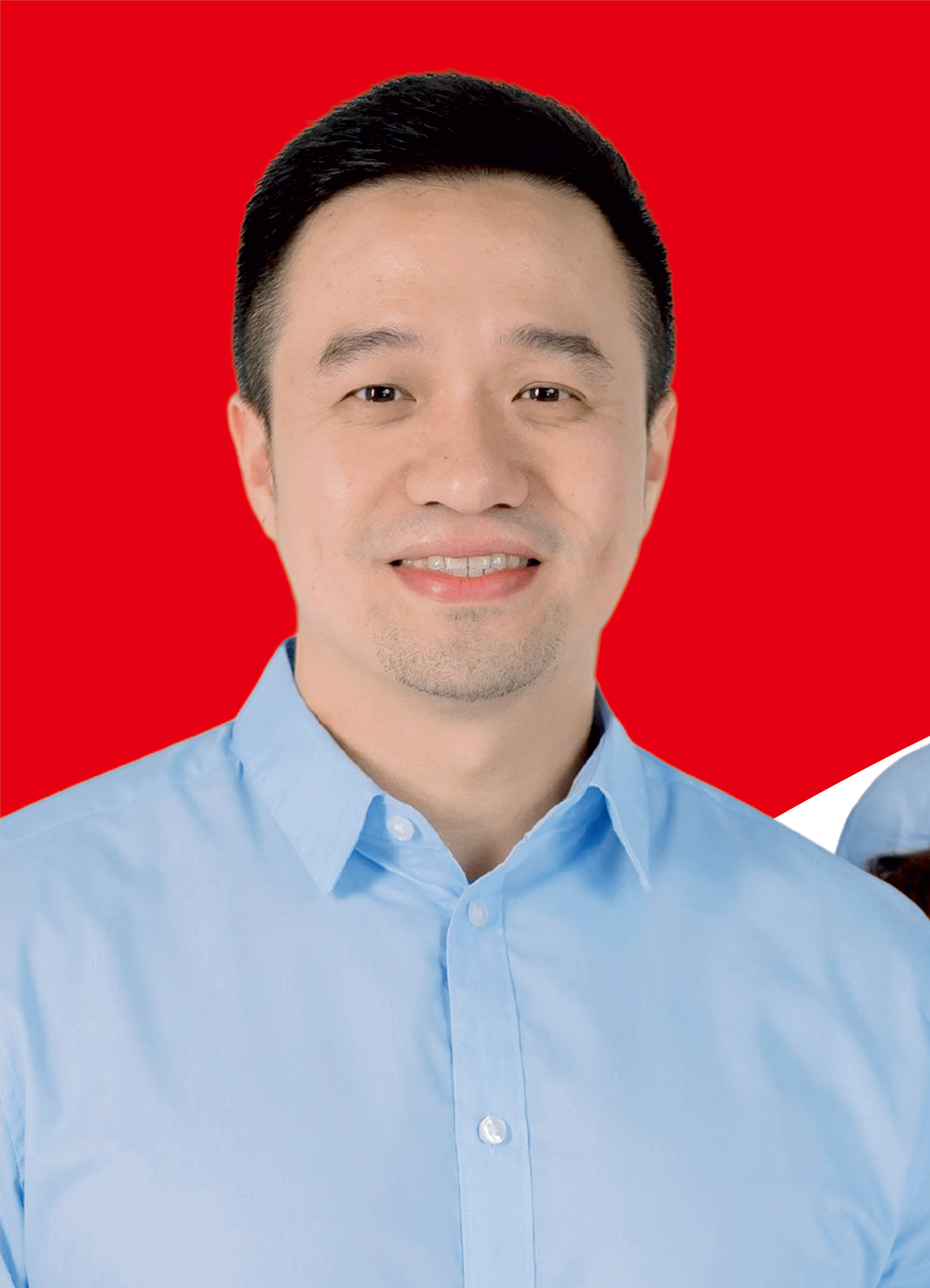

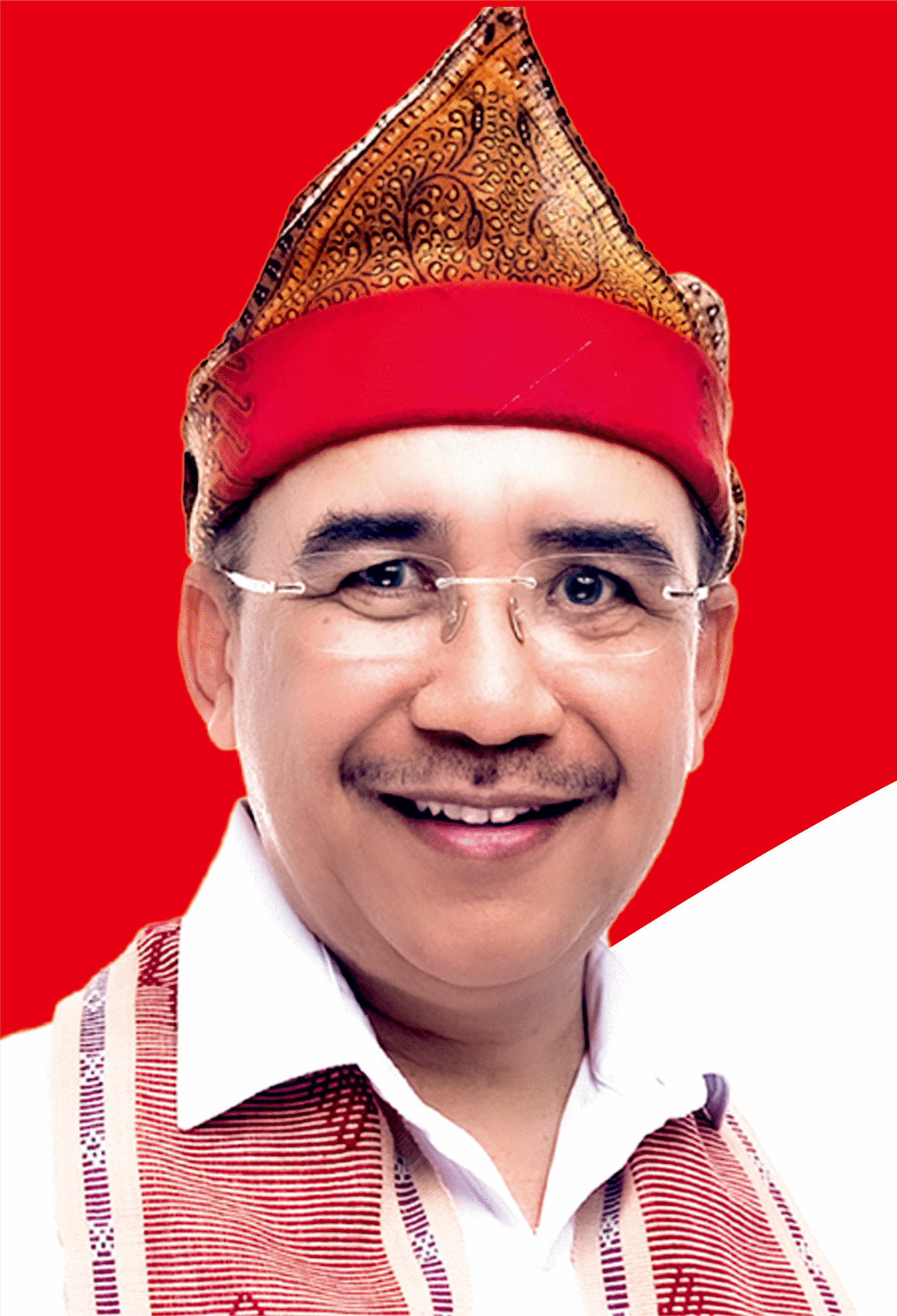

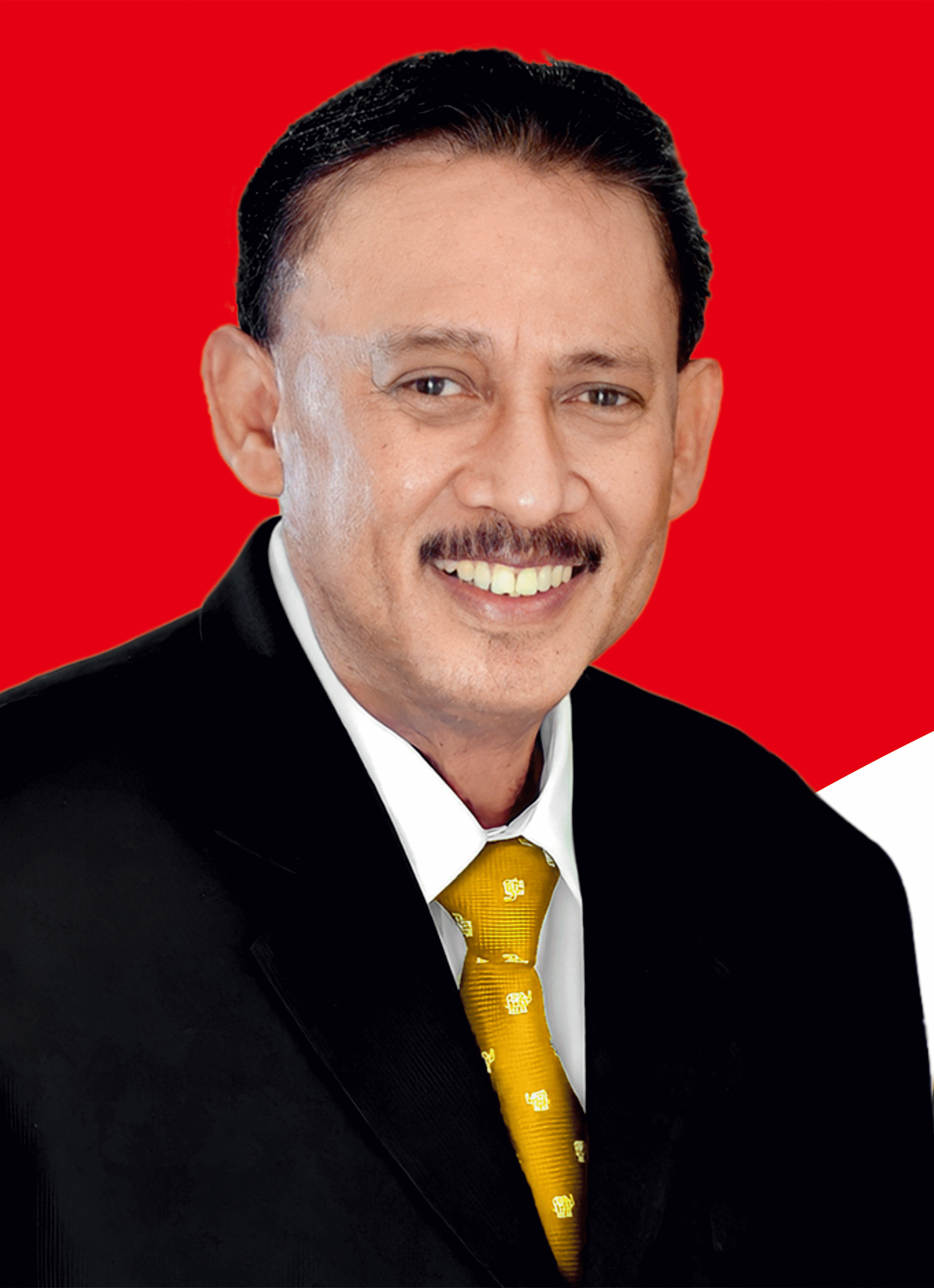
Candidate	Christian Widodo	Jefri Riwu Kore	Jonas Salean
Party	PSI	PDI-P	Golkar
Running mate	Serena Cosgrova Franscies	Lusia Adinda Dua Nurak	Sukardan Aloysius
Popular vote	68,830	50,093	41,300
Percentage	36.39%	26.48%	21.83%
- Results by subdistrict
Mayor before election
Linus Lusi (acting)
Independent
Elected mayor
Christian Widodo
PSI

The 2024 Kupang mayoral election was held on 27 November 2024 as part of nationwide local elections to elect the mayor of Kupang, East Nusa Tenggara for the 2025–2030 term. The previous election was held in 2017. Five pairs of candidates contested the election, including three former mayors: Jefri Riwu Kore (2017–2022), Jonas Salean (2012–2017), and George Melkianus Hadjoh (2022). Indonesian Solidarity Party politician Christian Widodo won the election with 36% of the vote.

== Electoral system ==
The election, like other local elections in 2024, follow the first-past-the-post system where the candidate with the most votes wins the election, even if they do not win a majority. It is possible for a candidate to run uncontested, in which case the candidate is still required to win a majority of votes "against" an "empty box" option. Should the candidate fail to do so, the election will be repeated on a later date.

There were 275,085 registered voters for the election, down from around 320 thousand in the February general election due to a revision in residency data. They voted in 552 polling stations, ran by 3,864 electoral officials.

== Candidates ==
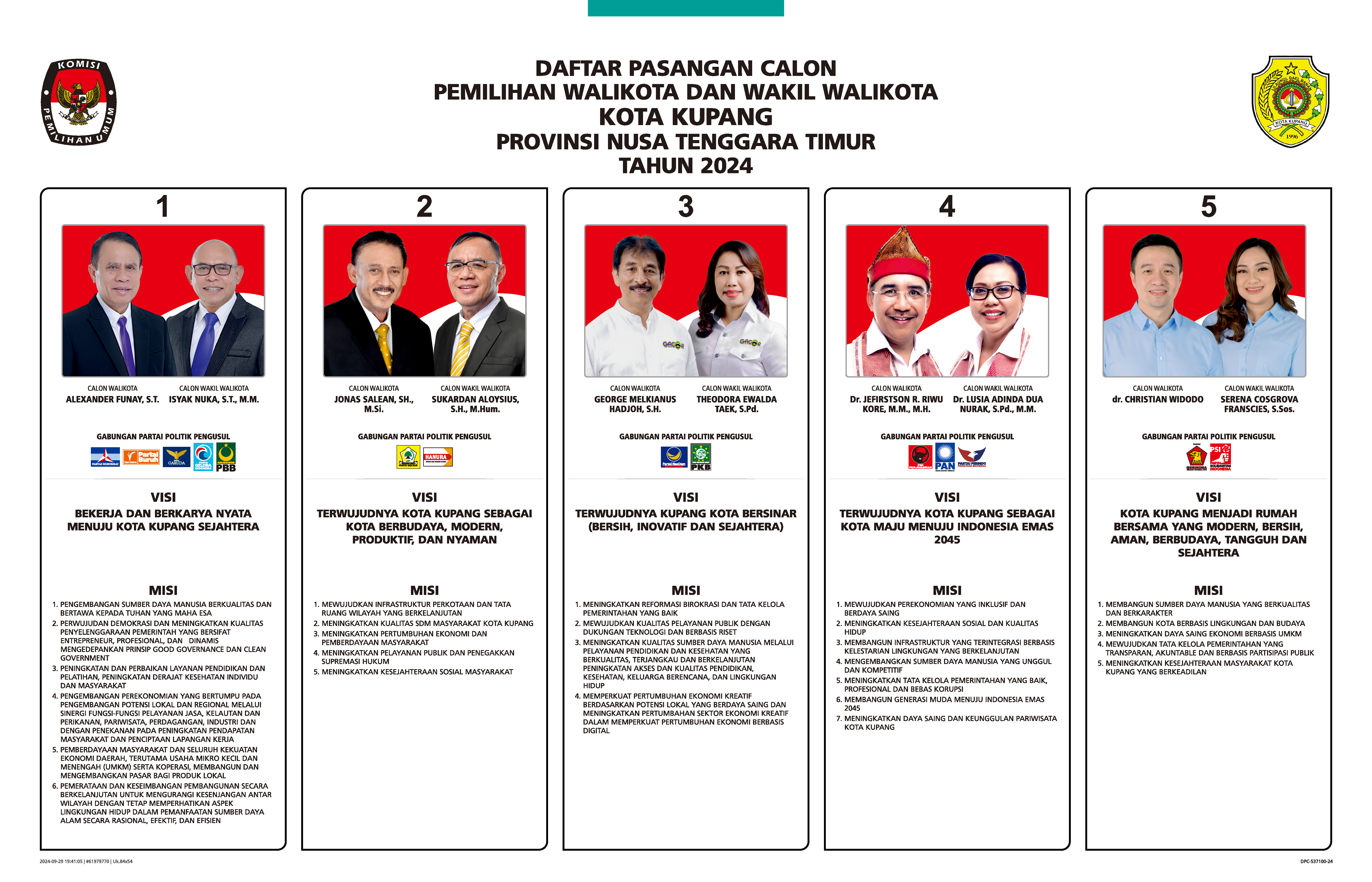
The list of candidates along with their statements as published by KPU.

According to electoral regulations, candidates in Kupang were required to secure the support of a political party or a coalition of parties which collectively won at least 8.5 percent of votes in the 2024 legislative election for the municipal legislature, i.e. at least 17,938 votes total. Candidates may alternatively register without party endorsement by submitting photocopies of identity cards, but Kupang had no independent mayoral candidates register for the election.

Three former mayors contested the election. Jefri Riwu Kore, who had served as mayor in the 2017–2022 term, ran for his second term with Lusia Adinda Lebu Raya, wife of former provincial governor Frans Lebu Raya, as running mate. The ticket received the endorsements of the Indonesian Democratic Party of Struggle, Perindo Party, and the National Mandate Party. Kore's predecessor and Kupang's mayor from 2012 to 2017, Jonas Salean, also contested the election, with the endorsement of Golkar and Hanura. Salean's running mate Aloysius Sukardan is an academic at Nusa Cendana University in Kupang.

The third former mayor in the election, George Melkianus Tadjoh, served as the acting mayor of Kupang in 2022–2023. His running mate is National Awakening Party (PKB) city legislator Theodora Ewalde Taek. The pair received the endorsement of PKB and the Nasdem Party. Provincial legislature member from the Indonesian Solidarity Party (PSI) and pharmacy owner in Kupang Christian Widodo also contested the election, with 25-year old Serena Cosgrove Franscies as his running mate. Franscies was the youngest candidate running in the 2024 local elections nationwide. Widodo and Francscies were endorsed by PSI and Gerindra. The fifth candidate, Alexander Funay, served in the provincial legislature as a Perindo member in the 2019–2024 term, with his running mate Isyak Nuka being a former bureaucrat in the provincial government. They were endorsed by Demokrat, Labour, Gelora, Garuda, and PBB.

== Campaign ==
Three rounds of public debates were held by the General Elections Commission between the mayoral candidates. Total campaign spending for the candidates were officially capped at Rp 26.7 billion (~USD 1.7 million).

== Results ==
Candidate	Running mate	Candidate party	Votes	%
Christian Widodo	Serena Cosgrova Franscies	Indonesian Solidarity Party	68,830	36.39
Jefri Riwu Kore	Lusia Adinda Dua Nurak	Indonesian Democratic Party of Struggle	50,093	26.48
Jonas Salean	Sukardan Aloysius	Golkar	41,300	21.83
George Melkianus Hadjoh	Theodora Ewalda Task	NasDem Party	15,084	7.97
Alexander Funay	Isyak Nuka	Democratic Party	13,863	7.33
Total			189,170	100.00
Valid votes			189,170	98.14
Invalid/blank votes			3,581	1.86
Total votes			192,751	100.00
Registered voters/turnout			275,085	70.07
Source: Kupang City KPU

Widodo and Franscies were sworn in on 20 February 2025.
