= Christian Widodo =

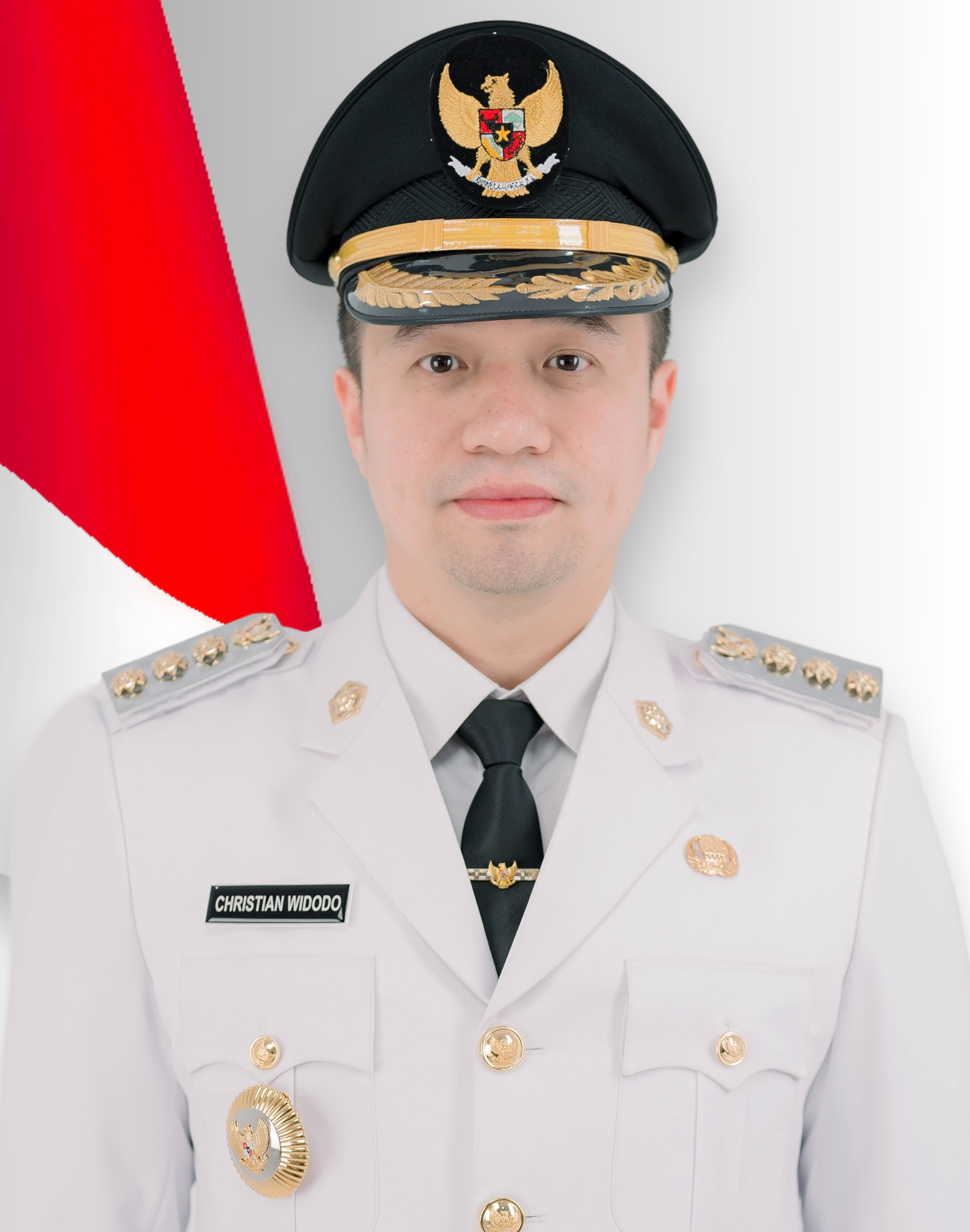

6th Mayor of Kupang
- Incumbent
- Assumed office 20 February 2025
- President: Prabowo Subianto
- Governor: Emanuel Melkiades Laka Lena
- Deputy: Serena Cosgrova Franscies
- Preceded by: Jefri Riwu Kore; Linus Lusi (Pj.)

Personal details
- Born: November 16, 1986 (age 39) Surabaya, East Java
- Party: Indonesian Solidarity Party
- Spouse: dr. Widya Cahya
- Children: 3
- Education: Tarumanagara University (dr.)
- Profession: Doctor, Politician

Christian Widodo (born 16 November 1986) is a politician from the Indonesian Solidarity Party who served as Mayor of Kupang for the 2025–2030 term. He took office on 20 February 2025 after being inaugurated by President Prabowo Subianto at the Istana Negara, Jakarta.

== Personal life ==
=== Education ===
Christian attended Don Bosco III Catholic Elementary School in Kupang (1992–1998). He then continued his education at St. Theresia Junior High School in Kupang (1998–2001) and Saint Joseph Catholic High School in Malang (2001–2004). After graduating from high school, he continued his medical studies at Tarumanagara University and earned his medical degree in 2012.

=== Organization ===
Christian has an active history in organizations, including serving as Chairman of the PSI East Nusa Tenggara, Chairman of HIPMI Kupang City (2016–2019), Deputy Chairman of the East Nusa Tenggara Chamber of Commerce and Industry (2023–2028).

During his leadership of the PSI in East Nusa Tenggara, he successfully won numerous seats in both the legislative and executive branches. This was evident in the 2024 legislative elections, where the PSI successfully formed its own faction, securing six seats in the East Nusa Tenggara Regional People's Representative Council. In the 2024 Kupang mayoral election, he was elected as mayor of Kupang, and three other PSI members were elected in concurrent elections as regional heads and deputy heads. For his achievements, he was appointed as a member of the advisory board of the Indonesian Solidarity Party at the 1st PSI Congress in Surakarta.

=== Career ===
Before being appointed as Mayor, Christian was a general practitioner and a member of the Regional Representative Council of East Nusa Tenggara Province for the 2019–2024 term.

As a physician, Christian has extensive experience in the medical field. He was appointed as the doctor for boxing at the 2018 Asian Games.

In addition, he also founded and manages several businesses in the healthcare and trade sectors. Among Christian's businesses are the Kupang Graha Media Clinic and the Anakici Store, a rapidly growing baby and children's supply store in Kupang City .

In the 2024 Kupang mayoral election, he ran for mayor of Kupang for the 2025–2030 term, paired with Serena Cosgrova Franscies, a politician from the Great Indonesia Movement Party. This pair of candidates won, winning 68.830 votes, or 36,39% of the total valid votes.

Political offices
Preceded by Jefri Riwu Kore; Linus Lusi (Pj.)	Mayor of Kupang; 2025–now	Succeeded by Incumbent
