= Samuel Kristian Lerik =

Indonesian military officer, bureaucrat and politician (1945-2010)

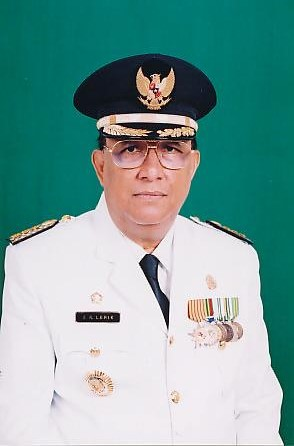

Mayor of Kupang (Note: As Administrative Mayor of Kupang (26 May 1986 – 25 April 1996), Acting Mayor of Kupang (25 April 1996 – 23 April 1997), Mayor of Kupang (23 April 1997 – 6 July 2007))
- In office 26 May 1986 – 6 July 2007
- Governor: Ben Mboi; Hendrikus Fernandez; Herman Musakabe; Piet Alexander Tallo
- Deputy: Daniel Adoe (since 2002)
- Preceded by: Mesakh Amalo
- Succeeded by: Daniel Adoe

Speaker of the Kupang Regency Regional People's Representative Council
- In office 12 August 1984 – 26 May 1986
- Governor: Ben Mboi
- Parliamentary group: Armed Forces

Personal details
- Born: 25 December 1945 Surabaya, East Java, Indonesia
- Died: 17 August 2010 (aged 64) Malang, East Java, Indonesia
- Party: Golkar
- Spouse: Maria Louisa Lerik-Adu (m. 1969)
- Children: M. Dinah Charlota; Viktor; Endang Susilowati; Gustaf Eliezer
- Parents: L. Ch. P. Lerik (father); Maryana Lerik-Laisina (mother)

Military service
- Allegiance: Indonesia
- Branch/service: Army
- Years of service: 1965-1999
- Rank: Colonel
- Unit: Infantry
- Battles/wars: Operation Lotus

Samuel Kristian Lerik (25 December 1945 – 17 August 2010) was an Indonesian military officer, bureaucrat, and politician who served as the mayor of Kupang from 1986 until 2007. Prior to becoming mayor, he had served in various military posts in East Nusa Tenggara and later in Kodam IX/Udayana

== Early life and education ==
Lerik was born in Surabaya, the capital of East Java, on 25 December 1945. He was the youngest child of L. Ch. P. Lerik and M. Lerik Laisina. He graduated from elementary school in 1957, junior high school in 1960, and senior high school in 1964. Lerik then attended the Animal Husbandry Faculty of the Udayana University, but dropped out several months later due to his interest in joining the Indonesian Army. He entered the Officer Candidate School in Cimahi after he dropped out and became a non-commissioned officer in 1965.

== Military career ==
Lerik's first deployment in the military was in Kupang, where he became a section officer at the Wirasakti (East Nusa Tenggara) Military Resort Command. Lerik was rotated from his post two years later in 1967 and held the same position at the Belu Military District. Lerik returned to Kupang after three years and was put in command of a platoon in the city. As with other members of the armed forces at that time, Lerik joined the Golkar political organization after attending an indoctrination course held by Golkar in 1971.

After holding command of a platoon in Kupang, Lerik underwent several other assignments in Kupang until 1980. He moved to Bali that year and became an officer at the Udayana Military Regional Command. He was reassigned in 1981 and became an assistant officer for American and European affairs in the army headquarters for three years.

== Speaker of the Kupang Regional People's Representative Council ==
Following his service in the army for two decades, Lerik became an appointee from the Armed Forces to the Kupang Regional People's Representative Council. He was elected as the council's speaker and installed on 12 August 1984. Several years before the end of his speakership, Lerik was promoted from the rank of major to lieutenant colonel on 1 April 1986. He resigned from the speaker's office following his appointment as a mayor.

== Administrative Mayor of Kupang ==
Lerik became the administrative mayor of Kupang on 26 May 1986, replacing Messakh Amalo who had served as mayor since the city's formation in 1978. Lerik undertook several courses during this period, such as a course on national alert held by the Ministry of Home Affairs in 1988 and a course on city management in 1996.

=== Works ===
Lerik's early years as administrative mayor saw him focusing on resolving the city's hygiene problem. He also took steps to improve the city's layout by constructing various monuments and statues. He also set up additional street lamps around Kupang, with emphasis around the Solor and Lahi Lai Bessi Kopam subdistrict. He instructed a mass plantation of various trees all over Kupang in order to freshen up the city's arid and dry climate.

Lerik conducted a review of the city's spatial planning legislation. He stated that most of the land which was initially intended as an open space in the city had hundreds of houses, markets, and public facilities build over it. Lerik then put forward a proposal to demolish the buildings but stated that he would observe the situation before starting the demolition process. The provincial government formed a team led by the Chairman of the Provincial Development Planning Agency S. Therik to research solutions for the problem. The team approved Lerik's plan to demolish the buildings and the process began on 4 March 1992. However, the demolition was reduced in scope to just 58 buildings that had no permits. The demolition process of a particular building, the partially finished Timor Beach Hotel, was personally led by Lerik and the regent of Kupang, Paul Lawarihi.

Despite the development during his term as administrative mayor, Lerik still failed to resolve water shortage, a problem that has plagued the city since its formation. Although the city has an abundant supply of water during rainfall, water supply often declined sharply during the dry season. As a result of this, the city often experienced clean water crises, with one of the worst occurring during Lerik's term from September to November 1990.

=== City status ===
Kupang was an administrative city during this period, meaning that the city has no legislative body and the mayor is responsible to its parent region's government instead of the provincial government. Lerik pushed to elevate the city's status into an autonomous city during his term and his efforts finally bore fruit after the Regional Autonomy Advisory Council listed the city as one of the cities that would be made autonomous. Preparations for the status upgrade began in February 1996, and a group of parliamentarians from the armed forces and Golkar conducted an inspection into the preparation process that month. The city officially became autonomous with the enactment of law regarding Kupang's status on 11 April 1996. Lerik became the city's first mayor in an acting capacity and he was sworn into office on 25 April 1996.

== Mayor of Kupang ==
=== Election ===
After having an acting mayor for about a year, the city council decided to hold an internal election to choose a definitive mayor who would serve for a five-year term. The election was held at the end of March 1997 and saw Lerik winning with 15 out of 19 city council members voting in favor of him. Lerik was installed on 23 April 1997 by Minister of Home Affairs Yogie Suardi Memet.

As Lerik's first mayoral term was about to end, the city council began preparations to elect a new mayor. Lerik was nominated by the Golkar and the armed forces to serve for a second term as mayor, with bureaucrat Daniel Adoe as his running mate. The election, which was conducted on 23 March 2002, was held in three separate rounds. In the final round, Lerik and Adoe became the winner with 16 out of 30 city council members voting in favor of him.

Lerik's second-term victory became the subject of dispute when a city council member named Ferdinand "Ferry" A. T. Nonna resigned several hours after the election commenced. Ferry admitted that he had been bribed ten million rupiahs by an associate of Lerik and Adoe and that he resigned as part of his moral responsibility. Edwin Fanggidae, the chairman of Indonesian Democratic Party of Struggle — the nominator of Lerik's opponent — branch in Kupang, stated that he had formed a team to investigate fraud allegations in the elections. Due to this dispute, Lerik's inauguration was delayed, and he kept serving as mayor in an acting capacity. The results were confirmed several months later and Lerik was sworn in for a second term on 6 July 2002. Lerik's 21-year rule over the city finally ended on 6 July 2007 and Governor Piet Alexander Tallo became the acting mayor for about a month.

=== 1998 riots ===
A few months after he was sworn into office, a religious riot occurred in Kupang. The riot was sparked after a group of people provoked masses standing in front of Kupang's main mosque, the At-Taqwa mosque. The provocateurs urged the masses to take revenge against church arsons by Muslims in Jakarta and Ketapang. The mob then set fire and ransack Bugis — a Muslim-majority ethnic — neighborhoods, markets, and kiosks. Eventually, several other larger buildings such as Muhammadiyah University, the Religious Bureau office, and several mosques, were also arsoned. As a result, transportation in Kupang went into a halt, with Kupang's main airport El Tari Airport being closed to prevent rioters from coming in and several ferry routes from Kupang being cancelled by port authorities. Access to main roads in Kupang were closed, food supply in the city began to decrease due to the closing of markets and neighborhoods in Kupang began organizing community patrol to prevent further riots. Lerik condemned the riots, stating that the riots was the worst incident the city had ever seen, and urged the responsible authorities to prosecuted the rioters.

=== Corruption and nepotism ===
Lerik's longevity in office was credited for his strong control of Kupang's civil service. Sylvia Tidey, an anthropologist from the University of Virginia, argued that Lerik was the manifestation of Bapakisme ("Fatherism") governance system that combined "strict authoritarianism with the clientelist dispersion of formal and informal favors to loyal subordinates". Most of Lerik's civilian appointment was based on relations and favoritism instead of merits and achievement.

An example of this could be seen in Lerik's choice for the city secretary post — the third highest office in the city, Jonas Salean. Although Salean placed lowest in a competency test for the office, and lacking in skill, authority and seniority, Lerik appointed him for the office nonetheless. Lerik made Salean as one of his cronies, and eventually his "corruption friend" and "collusion friend". According to longtime civil servants in the city, Lerik was often seen to have bypassed Adoe — who was not part of Lerik's inner circle — in favor of Salean in decision making processes.

== Family ==
Lerik was married to Maria Louisa Lerik Adu during his service in Belu on 3 August 1969. The couple has four children, namely M. Dinah Charlota, Viktor, Endang Susilowati, and Gustaf Eliezer. His son Viktor became the Speaker of the Kupang city council from 2009 until 2011 and a member of the East Nusa Tenggara provincial council from 2014 until 2018. Viktor attempted to follow his father's footsteps and run as the Mayor of Kupang in 2012 and 2017, but his candidacy was rejected by the local electoral commission.

== Death ==
Lerik died at the Syaiful Anwar Hospital in Malang on 17 August 2010. Previously, Lerik had been treated for kidney failure in the hospital since December 2009, and an implant was installed in his bone six days before his death. His body was laid at the Kupang mayor's office a day after his death and was buried at the Dharmaloka Public Cemetery in Kupang on 19 August 2010.

== Legacy ==
A street in Kupang was named after Lerik. The central hospital of Kupang was renamed to S. K. Lerik Regional Public Hospital in 2015.

== Awards ==
- Timor Military Campaign Medal (Indonesian: Satyalancana Seroja) (1976)
- Star of Service, 2nd Category (Indonesian: Bintang Jasa Pratama) (1988)
- Military Long Service Medals, 2nd Category (Indonesian: Satyalancana Kesetiaan 24 Tahun) (1989)
- Social Welfare Medal (Indonesian: Satyalancana Kebhaktian Sosial) (1995)
- Star of Kartika Eka Paksi, 3rd Class (Indonesian: Bintang Kartika Eka Paksi Nararya) (1996)
- Health Medal, 2nd Class (Indonesian: Satyalancana Ksatria Bhakti Husada Arutala) (1996)
