= Jefri Riwu Kore =

Indonesian politician

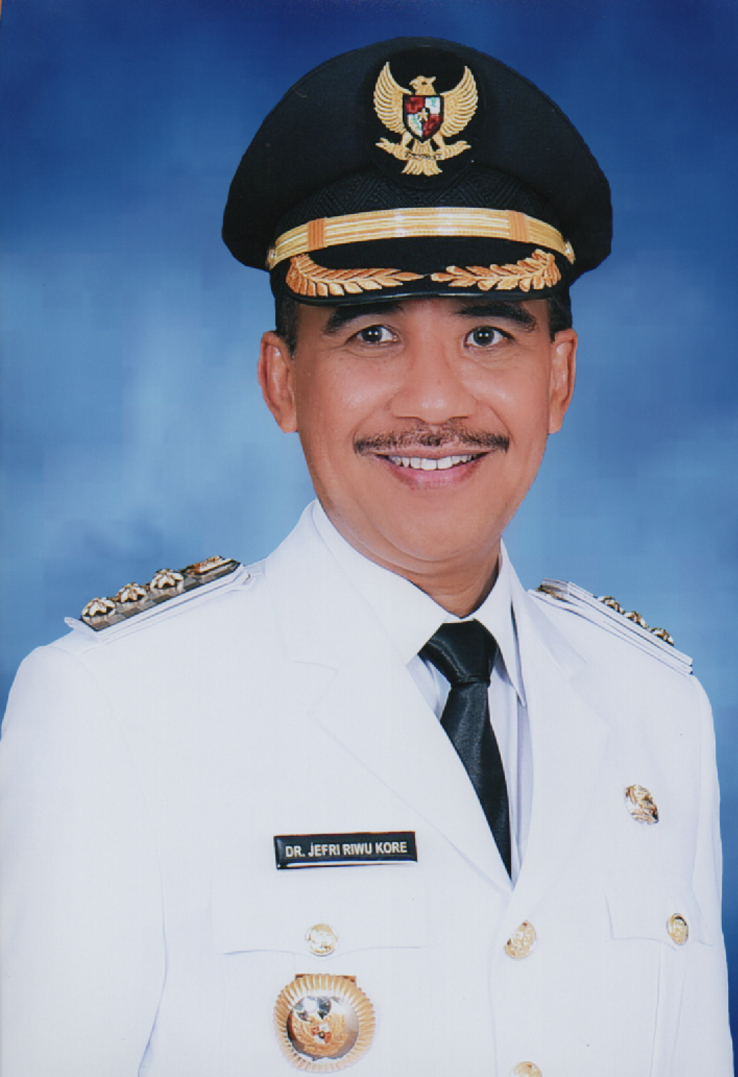

4th Mayor of Kupang
- In office 22 August 2017 – 22 August 2022
- President: Joko Widodo
- Governor: Frans Lebu Raya; Robert Simbolon (Pj.); Viktor Laiskodat

Member of People's Representative Council
- In office 2009–2016
- President: Susilo Bambang Yudhoyono; Joko Widodo

Personal details
- Born: Jefirstson R. Riwu Kore; January 13, 1960 (age 66) Kupang, East Nusa Tenggara, Indonesia
- Party: Democratic Party
- Education: Indonesia University of Education; Pelita Harapan University; Gajah Mada University; 17 August University

Jefirstson R. Riwu Kore (born January 13, 1960) is an Indonesian politician and mayor of Kupang between 2017 and 2022. He was previously member of People's Representative Council from East Nusa Tenggara. In February 2021, he contracted COVID-19. He ran for reelection in the 2024 mayoral election, but was defeated by Christian Widodo.
