= Piet Alexander Tallo =

Indonesian politician (1942–2009)

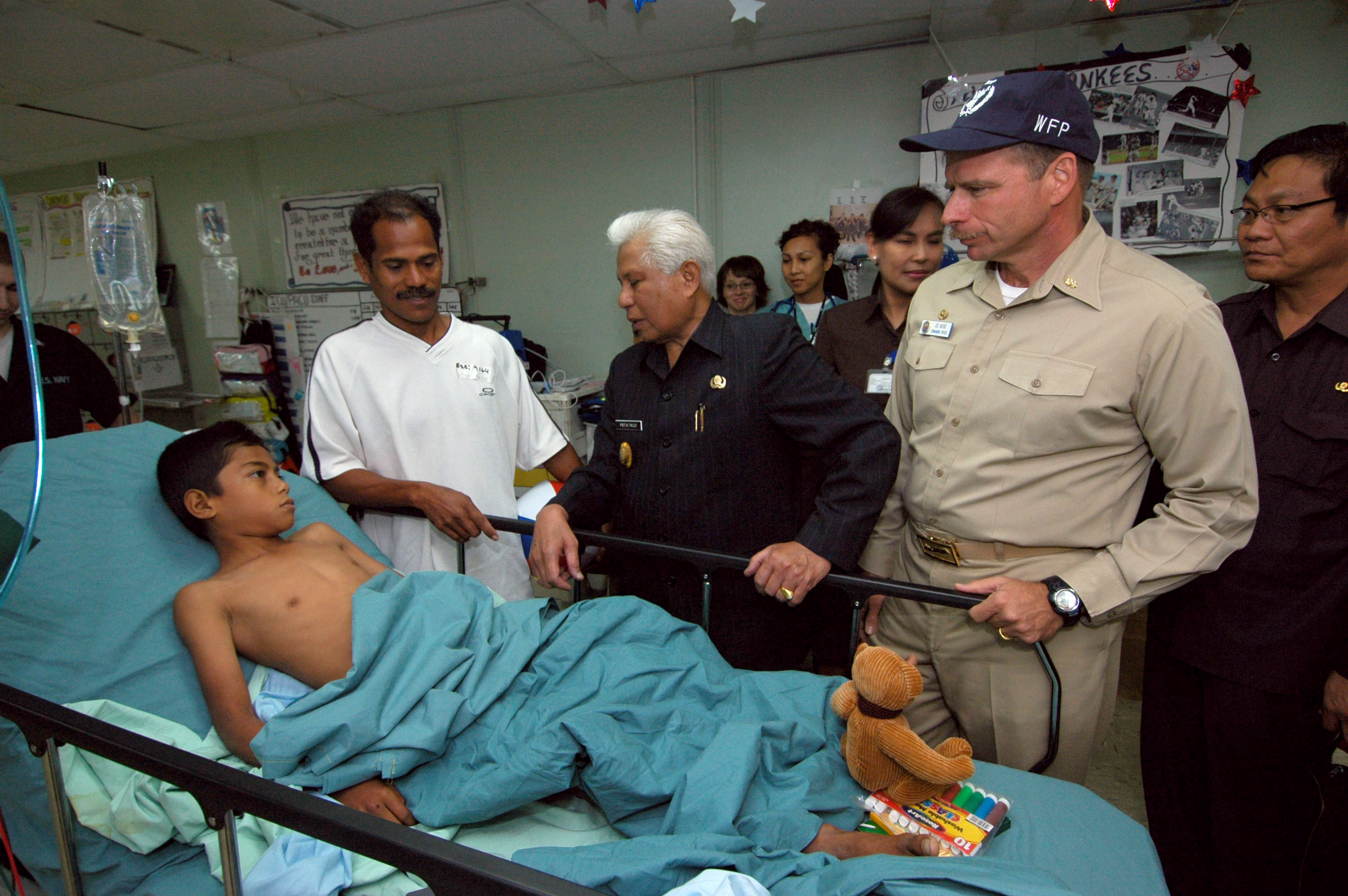
- Piet Alexander Tallo during a tour of the USNS Mercy (T-AH-19)

Governor of East Nusa Tenggara
- In office 1998–2008
- President: Suharto; B.J. Habibie; Abdurrahman Wahid; Megawati Sukarnoputri; Susilo Bambang Yudhoyono
- Preceded by: Herman Musakabe
- Succeeded by: Frans Lebu Raya

Personal details
- Born: 27 May 1942 Tepas, South Central Timor, East Nusa Tenggara, Japanese-occupied East Indies
- Died: 25 April 2009 (aged 66) Jakarta, Indonesia
- Resting place: Dharmaloka Heroes Cemetery, Kupang
- Education: Gadjah Mada University

Piet Alexander Tallo (27 May 1942 – 25 April 2009) was an Indonesian politician. He was governor of East Nusa Tenggara in 1998–2008. Because he was seriously ill since 2007, the governor often handed tasks over to his vice governor, Frans Lebu Raya, who was elected as governor through the election in 2008. He received a law degree from the Gadjah Mada University in 1970. Tallo also served as regent of South Central Timor Regency in 1983–1993. Tallo died from an acute asthma attack on 25 April 2009.

Political offices
Preceded by Herman Musakabe	Governor of East Nusa Tenggara; 1998–2008	Succeeded by Frans Lebu Raya
