= Benny Kabur Harman =

Indonesian politician (born 1962)

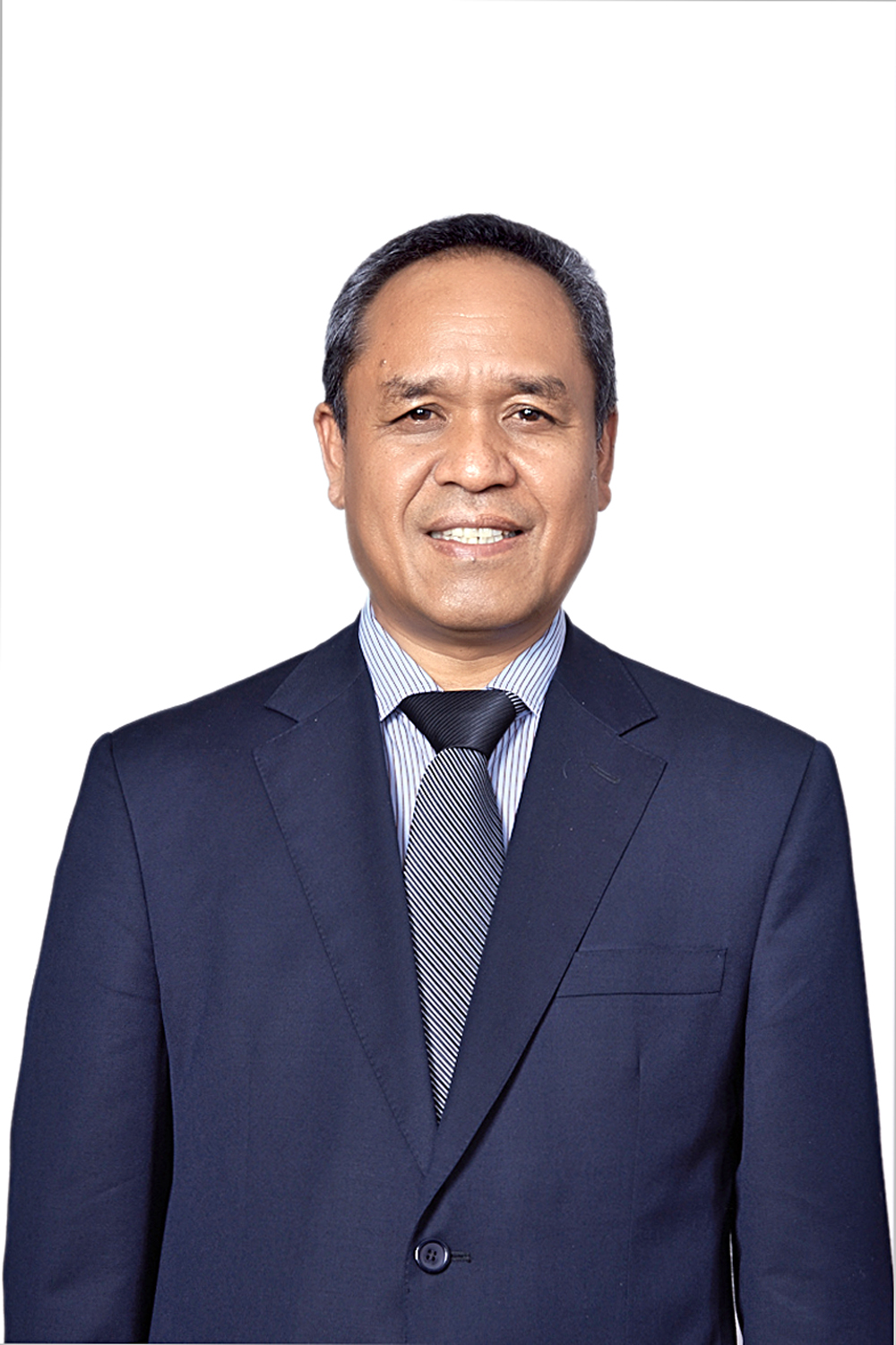
- Official portrait, 2017

Member of the House of Representatives
- Incumbent
- Assumed office 1 October 2019
- Preceded by: Yosef Benediktus Badeoda
- Constituency: East Nusa Tenggara III
- In office 1 October 2009 – 5 Februari 2018
- Preceded by: Multi-member district
- Succeeded by: Yosef B. Badeoda
- Constituency: East Nusa Tenggara III
- In office 1 October 2004 – 2008
- Preceded by: Constituency established
- Succeeded by: Bruno Kaka Wawo
- Constituency: East Nusa Tenggara III

Personal details
- Born: Harman Benediktus Kabur; 19 September 1962 (age 64) Manggarai, East Nusa Tenggara, Indonesia
- Party: Democratic (since 2008)
- Other political affiliations: IJUP (2004–2008)
- Spouse: Maria Goreti Ernawati
- Children: 3
- Education: Universitas Brawijaya; Universitas Indonesia

Benny Kabur Harman (born in Manggarai on 19 September 1962) is an Indonesian politician and a member of the House of Representatives of the Republic of Indonesia and member of the Democratic Party. Harman made news after rejecting the Omnibus Law on Job Creation and being denied to express his opinion by the Deputy Speaker of the DPR, Azis Syamsuddin.

While studying law at the University of Brawijaya, he was active at the Union of Catholic University Students of the Republic of Indonesia and served as the head of the Malang Branch from 1985 to 1990. He is also a founder and director of the Indonesian Legal Aid Association (PBHI) from 1995 to 1998.

Harman is part of Commission II of the DPR.
