= Viktor Laiskodat =

Indonesian politician (born 1965)

Viktor Bungtilu Laiskodat
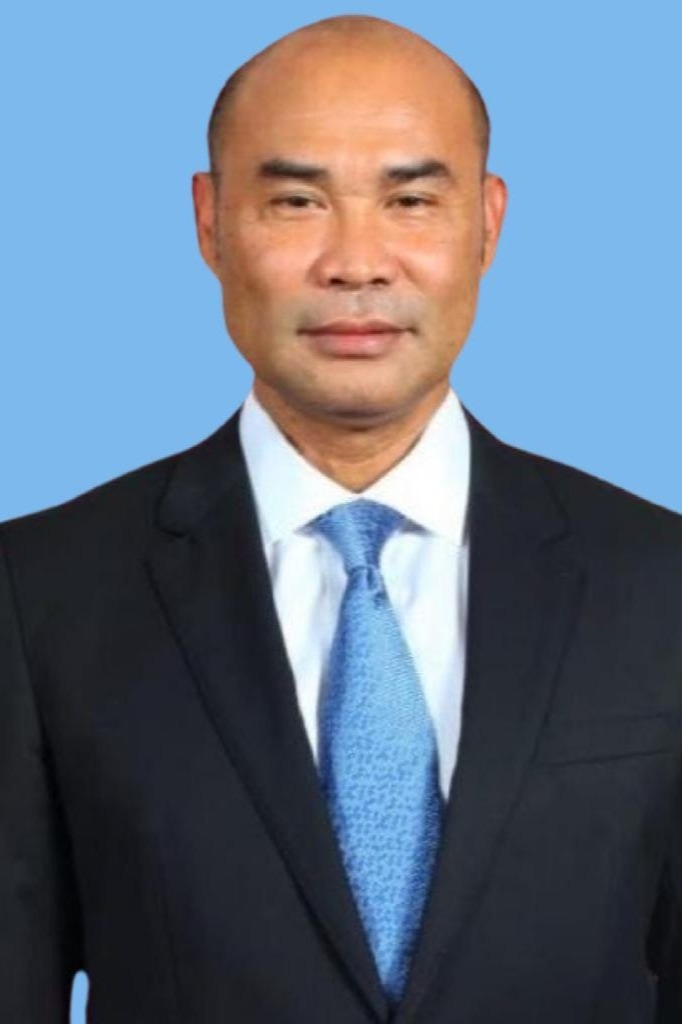

8th Governor of East Nusa Tenggara
- In office 5 September 2018 – 5 September 2023
- President: Joko Widodo
- Deputy: Josef Nae Soi
- Preceded by: Frans Lebu Raya
- Succeeded by: Ayodhia Kalake (acting); Andriko Noto Susanto (acting); Emanuel Melkiades Laka Lena

Member of People's Representative Council
- Incumbent
- Assumed office 1 October 2024
- In office 1 October 2014 – 19 December 2017
- In office 1 October 2004 – 1 October 2009
- Constituency: East Nusa Tenggara II

Personal details
- Born: 17 February 1965 (age 61) Kupang Regency, East Nusa Tenggara, Indonesia
- Party: Nasdem
- Spouse: Julie Sutrisno
- Children: 3
- Parents: Lazarus Laiskodat (father); Orpha Kase (mother)

Viktor Bungtilu Laiskodat (born 17 February 1965) is an Indonesian politician who served the 8th governor of East Nusa Tenggara between 2018 and 2023, and previously as a member of the House of Representatives between 2004–2009 and 2014–2017. He was elected into the House of Representatives from his home district twice in 2004 and 2014, although he did not serve his entire second term because he resigned to run for governor.

== Background ==
Born as the youngest child of Lazarus Laiskodat and Orpha Laiskodat Kase in Oenesu, in the western part of Kupang Regency. He is a Protestant Christian (despite the province's Roman Catholic-majority demographic) and ethnically belongs to the Helong people. After completing his first 12 years of education at Kupang in 1985, he studied law in Jakarta's Indonesian Law Institute (Sekolah Tinggi Ilmu Hukum Indonesia), completing his bachelor's degree in 2000. In 2017, he graduated from Satya Wacana Christian University in Salatiga, earning a master's degree in development studies.

== Career ==
After graduating, Laiskodat worked as a lawyer and law consultant, owning his own law firm (Viktor B. Laiskodat Law Firm). He also became commissioner at several companies.

=== Parliament ===
He was first elected to the People's Representative Council as a member of Golkar in 2004 from the NTT II electoral district, which included Sumba, Timor, and surrounding islands. In 2009, he did not gain a seat. However, in 2014, he ran as a member of NasDem Party and won a seat after securing 77,555 votes - third place out of a quota of seven. In his second term at the council, he was part of Commission I and also was the speaker of Nasdem's faction in the parliament. During the 2014 presidential election, he was part of Joko Widodo's campaign team.

In 2017, President of Indonesia Joko Widodo released an executive order (Peraturan Pemerintah Pengganti Undang-Undang) allowing the government to disband mass organizations deemed opposing the state's ideology, with opposition parties and several rights organizations condemning the move. Laiskodat defended the law and accused four then-opposition parties; Great Indonesia Movement Party, Democratic Party, National Mandate Party, and Prosperous Justice Party of supporting establishment of caliphate in Indonesia and undermining national ideology, Pancasila, changing it to Islamism. All four parties denied his accusations and sued him for defamation. Due to both immunity of legislators and his gubernatorial bid in the 2018 gubernatorial election, the case was delayed. Islamic groups affiliated with the 212 movement later held protests demanding his arrest and trial for blasphemy.

He resigned from the council to run as governor and was replaced on 20 March 2018 by Jacki Uli.

=== Governor ===
He ran for governorship of East Nusa Tenggara in the 2018 election. Paired with Josef Nae Soi as running mate, he won the four-candidate race with 838,213 votes (35.6%). Laiskodat was sworn in on 5 September 2018. Immediately after being sworn in, Laiskodat announced to media that he would put a moratorium on mining in the province. The moratorium was issued on 14 November 2018, but environmental activists criticized the regulation for only suspending mining activities in the province to evaluate existing regulations, instead of halting mining entirely.

Shortly after he became governor, Laiskodat stated his intent to legalize the brewing of local alcoholic beverages in the province - namely, Moke in Flores and Sopi in Timor. The beverage, which was to be called "Sophia", was planned to begin production in June 2019.

In early 2019, his administration announced plans to close Komodo Island to visitors for a year to allow the government to manage the park better and increase the population of both deer and the lizards. In July 2019, it was confirmed that Komodo Island would be closed for a period to tourism beginning in 2020 to allow a conservation program to be implemented.

Laiskodat has also publicly spoke out in opposition to halal tourism in the area, stating that "tourism has nothing to do with religion." In 2019, the provincial government announced its plans to open a provincial trade office in neighboring East Timor. In October 2019, Laiskodat publicly called for the Ministry of Communication and Information Technology to block access to Facebook in Indonesia, calling for the development of a local social media platform similar to the Chinese internet.

During the COVID-19 pandemic, Laiskodat agreed to provide quarantine to 17 East Timor nationals returning from China in East Nusa Tenggara, as East Timor had no quarantine facilities and initial requests to quarantine them in Bali had been rejected by Bali's administration. As the virus spread in Indonesia, he instructed schools to close by 20 March, at which point the province had 38 people under monitoring for the disease.

In February 2023, Laiskodat ordered high schools in the province to begin activities at 5 AM. This was later pared down to two public high schools in the provincial capital of Kupang which was to begin teaching at 5:30 AM, and the policy was reversed in September 2023 immediately following the end of Laiskodat's term.

After the end of his first term as governor, he ran for a seat in the House of Representatives representing East Nusa Tenggara's 2nd district, but as he placed second out of Nasdem candidates in the district with 63,359 votes, he failed to qualify for the sole Nasdem seat there. However, as the first place candidate Ratu Ngadu Bonu Wulla resigned shortly after the election to run in the 2024 Indonesian local elections, Laiskodat took her place in the legislature.

== Family ==
He is married to Julie Sutrisno Laiskodat, a graduate of UT Arlington. The couple has three sons.

Political offices
Preceded by Frans Lebu Raya	Governor of East Nusa Tenggara; 2018–2023	Succeeded by Ayodhia Kalake
