= Emanuel Melkiades Laka Lena =

Indonesian politician (born 1976)

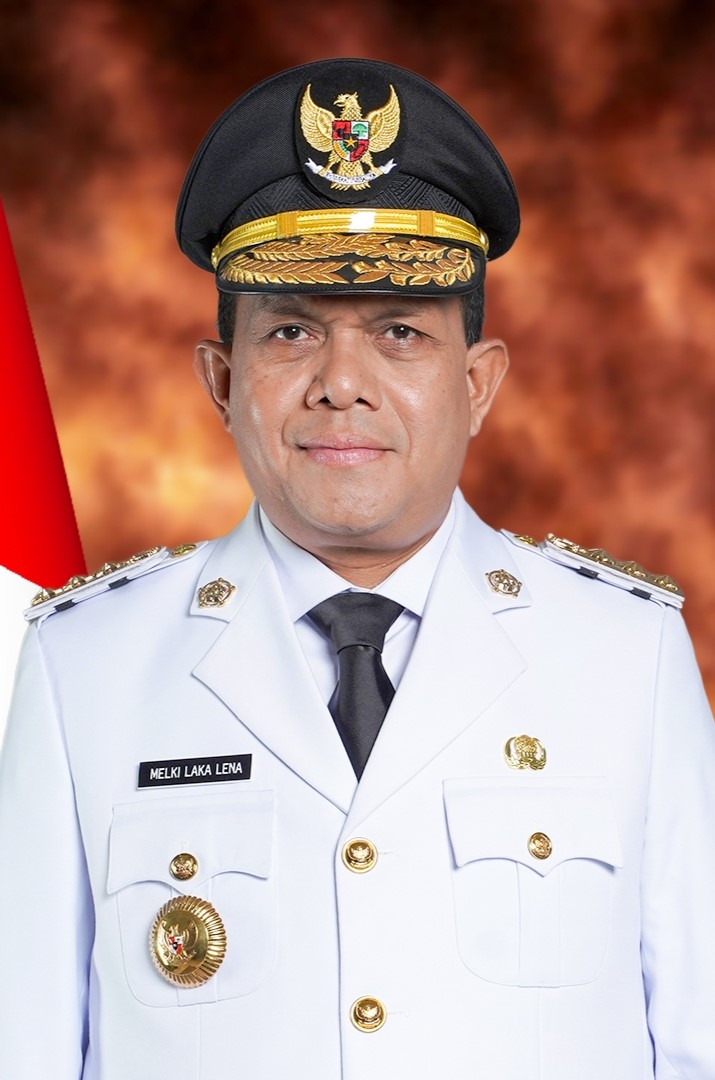
- Laka Lena in 2025

Governor of East Nusa Tenggara
- Incumbent
- Assumed office 20 February 2025
- Vice Governor: Johanis Asadoma
- Preceded by: Viktor Laiskodat; Ayodhia Kalake (act.); Andriko Noto Susanto (act.)

Member of the House of Representatives
- In office 1 October 2019 – 30 September 2024
- Parliamentary group: Golkar
- Constituency: NTT III

Personal details
- Born: 10 December 1976 (age 49) Kupang, East Nusa Tenggara, Indonesia
- Party: Golkar

Emanuel Melkiades Laka Lena (born 10 December 1976) is an Indonesian politician serving as governor of East Nusa Tenggara since 2025. From 2019 to 2024, he was a member of the House of Representatives.
