= Frans Lebu Raya =

Indonesian politician (1960–2021)

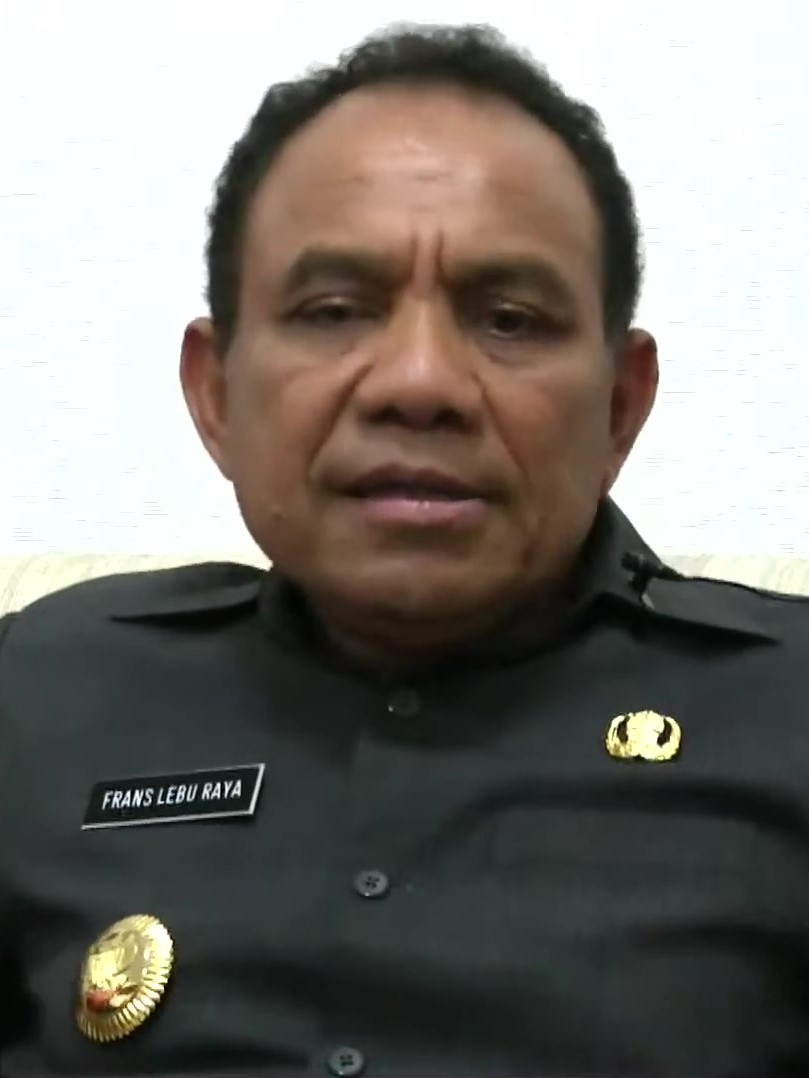

Governor of East Nusa Tenggara
- In office 16 July 2008 – 17 July 2018
- President: Susilo Bambang Yudhoyono; Joko Widodo
- Deputy: Esthon Foenay (2008–2013); Benny Alexander Litelnoni (2013–2018)
- Preceded by: Piet Alexander Tallo
- Succeeded by: Robert Simbolon (acting); Viktor Laiskodat

Personal details
- Born: 18 May 1960 Adonara, East Nusa Tenggara, Indonesia
- Died: 19 December 2021 (aged 61) Denpasar, Bali, Indonesia
- Party: Indonesian Democratic Party – Struggle
- Spouse: Lusia Adinda Dua Nurak Lebu Raya
- Education: Nusa Cendana University

Frans Lebu Raya (18 May 1960 – 19 December 2021) was an Indonesian politician who was the 8th Governor of East Nusa Tenggara between 2008 and 2018.

== Early life ==
Raya was born on 18 May 1960 in Watoone village, a small village located on the island of Adonara in East Flores Regency, East Nusa Tenggara. He was the second son of a local peasant couple, Paulus Ola Samon and Ina Maria Wae Peka. Raya entered a local elementary school at his village at the age of four years old and completed his education at the elementary school in 1971 at the age of eleven.

Raya continued to pursue his education at the Palugodam Junior High School, a high school owned by Indonesian Democratic Party-linked political activist, Thomas Sili Mado Lamabelawa. The school was located ten kilometres away from his home village and Raya had to travel by foot alongside his friends. Raya ended his studies there three years later in 1974 and went to Kupang to study at the Kupang Higher Gymnasium until 1977.

== Career as educator ==
From Kupang, Raya returned to his home village and became a teacher at a local junior high school until 1980. After that, Raya established a junior high school—Lamaholot Catholic Junior High School—and became its headmaster. A few years later, Raya left his position of headmaster and returned to Kupang to pursue further education at Nusa Cendana University, the only university at that time in East Nusa Tenggara.

During his studies in the university, Raya became active in organizational and political activities. He was elected as the chairman of the university's senate in 1988 for a two-year term and led the Indonesian National University Student Movement's branch in Kupang. He graduated from the university with a doctorandus and started to teach at Widya Mandala Catholic University and Kupang Technical Academy. He also founded the Prosperous Community Foundation, which aimed at assisting the community in implementing projects in the health sector, especially nutrition improvement, community disease control, and HIV/AIDS.

== Political career ==
Raya left his job as an educator to pursue a full-time career in politics. Raya became the chairman of the Indonesian Democratic Party's (PDIP) branch in Kupang in 1996. When the 27 July 1996 incident occurred in the same year, Raya sided with Megawati Sukarnoputri, as opposed to the government-backed Suryadi. After the political reformation that overthrew Suharto in 1998, Megawati formed the Indonesian Democratic Party of Struggle and Raya became the secretary of East Nusa Tenggara's branch of the party. During the first party congress that was held in early October 1998, Raya and the party branch's leader, Anton Haba, strongly supported Megawati's leadership as well as her nomination for presidency.

He was nominated as a candidate for the East Nusa Tenggara's Regional People's Representative Council (local parliament) in the 1999 Indonesian legislative election. Raya was elected to the council and became the council's deputy speaker. A year later, in 2000, Raya replaced Anton Haba as the party's leader in East Nusa Tenggara. He did not finish his term as deputy speaker, as in 2003 Raya became the running mate of Piet Alexander Tallo for his second term as governor against Viktor Laiskodat and Simon Hayon. Tallo and Raya narrowly defeated the pair with a margin of one vote in a parliamentary election on 19 June 2003. Tallo and Raya were installed as governor and deputy governor on 16 July 2003.

Although serving as deputy governor, in reality Raya handled much of the governor's duties, since Tallo's health condition had become worse towards the end of his term. Aside from his tasks as deputy governor, Raya was also active in the political party, being chosen to lead the 2005 PDI-P congress in Bali.

== Governor of Nusa Tenggara ==
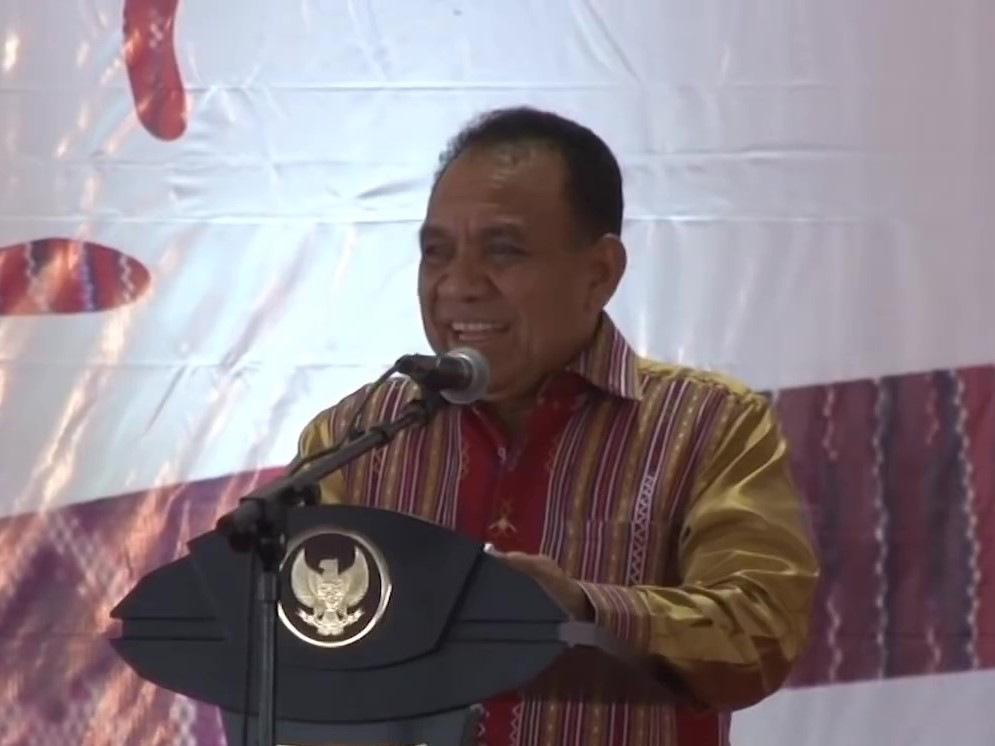
Frans Lebu Raya delivering a speech at the 2015 National Christmas celebration

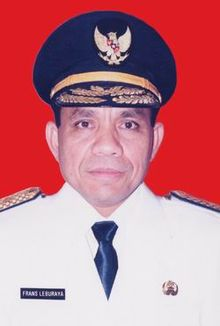
Frans Lebu Raya in his governor's uniform

=== Election ===
In early 2008, while still serving as deputy governor, Raya was nominated as the governor by his party, PDI-P. Raya picked Esthon Foenay as his running mate. Raya won the election with 37,35% of the votes. After he was announced as the winner of the election, Raya immediately visited his opponents' residences as a sign of reconciliation, stating that his opponents were "assets that must be invited to work together to develop this area". Raya was installed as governor on 16 June 2008.

Towards the end of his second term, Raya decided to seek re-election. Although expecting that his deputy would become his running mate for a second term, Foenay decided to nominate himself as a governor amidst political pressures from his party. Feeling disheartened, Raya then chose Deputy Regent of Central Southern Timor Regency, Benny Alexander Litelnoni. Despite being political opponents in the upcoming election, Raya and Foenay continued to work together. Raya eventually won his re-election bid with 51.25% of the vote. Raya would serve for a total of ten years and one day until he was replaced by Robert Simbolon, who served in an acting capacity, on 17 July 2018.

=== Anggur Merah program ===
Raya's most popular program as governor was the Anggur Merah (translation: Red Wine) program. The program, whose acronymic title stands for Anggaran Untuk Rakyat Menuju Sejahtera (Budget for Underdeveloped Communities; literally Budget for People Towards Prosperity), was introduced on the occasion of the province's 52nd anniversary on 20 December 2010. The program, which was started in 2011, draws funds from local revenue, which amounted to 81.7 billion rupiahs. The funds were distributed to the 287 poorest villages in 287 districts. Each village that was designated for this program received 250 million. In order to ensure that the distributed funds were used correctly, Raya recruited 287 assistants to supervise the usage of the funds.

Raya's program continued to grow in size following his second term as governor. A year after his re-election, the number of villages that were designated as recipients under this program grew to 589 villages. Raya stated that he has planned so that every village received the funds this program a year before the end of his second term. The program eventually ended as expected in 2017 and the management of the Anggur Merah funds was handed over to local cooperatives in every village. His successor's administration continued to supervise the management of funds by involving provincial bureaucracy and local NGOs.

== Death ==
Raya died at the Sanglah Hospital in Bali on 19 December 2021, at the age of 61. His body was brought to Kupang the day after and was laid at the governor's office for about an hour. His body was buried at the Adonara Cemetery in a military ceremony on 22 December.

== Family ==
Raya was married to Lusia Adinda Du'a Nurak. The couple had two children, Maria Yubiliani Laetare Nurak and Karmelia Eleonoraputri Bengan Tokan.

Political offices
Preceded by Piet Alexander Tallo	Governor of East Nusa Tenggara; 2008–2018	Succeeded by Viktor Laiskodat
