= Mayor of Pematangsiantar =

- Wali Kota Pematangsiantar
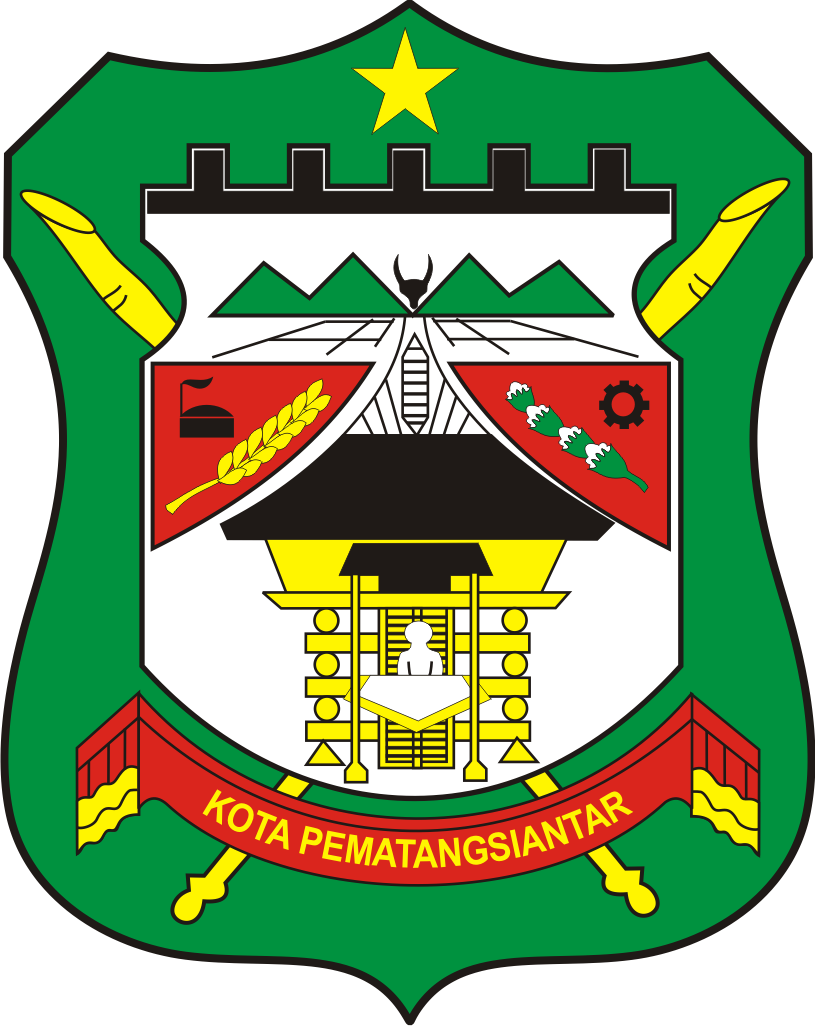
- Coat of arms of Pematangsiantar

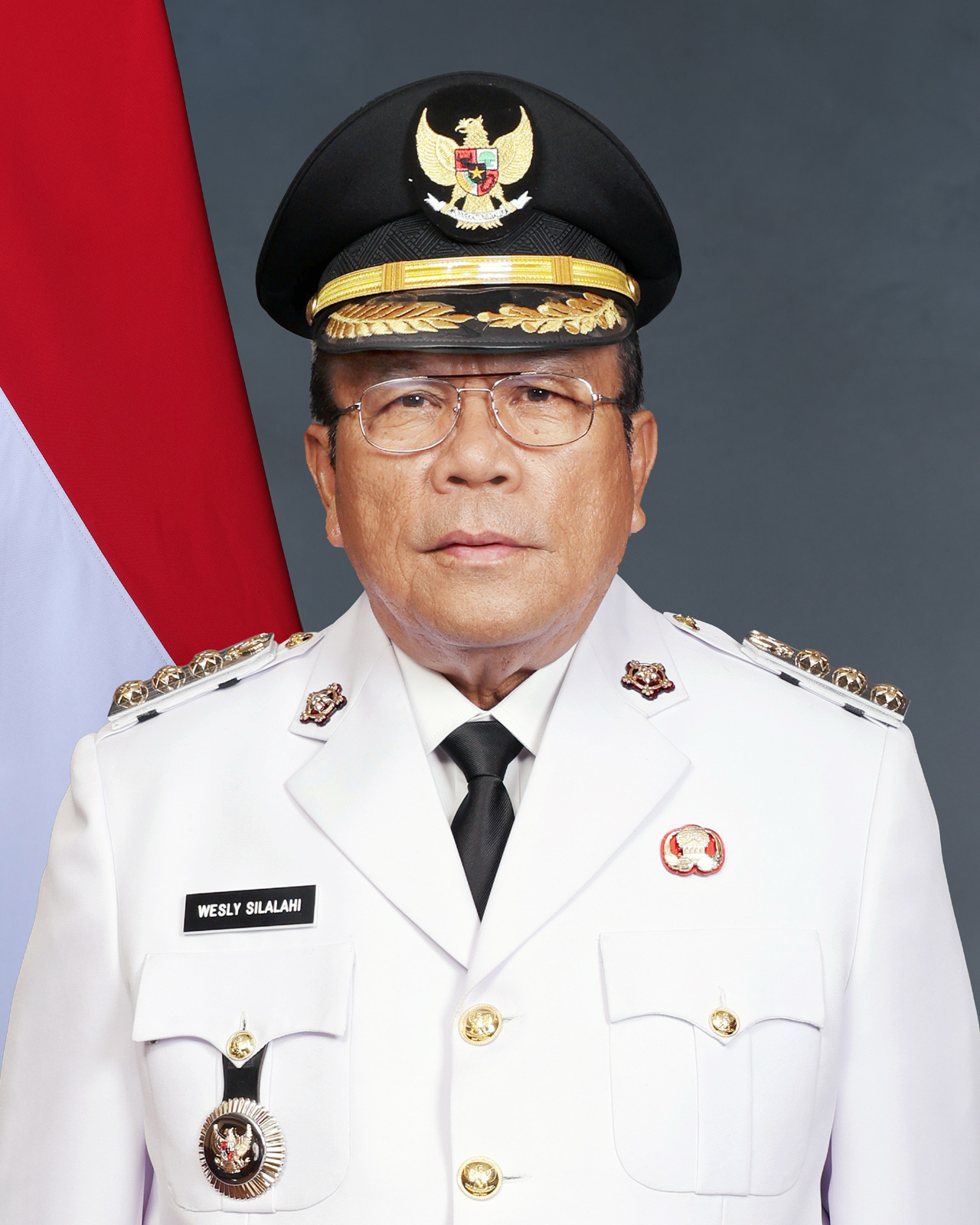
- Incumbent; Wesly Silalahi since 20 February 2025
- Term length: 5 years
- Inaugural holder: O. K. H. Salamuddin
- Formation: 1956
- Website: Official website

Mayor of Pematangsiantar is the head of the second-level region who holds the government in Pematangsiantar together with the Vice Mayor and 30 members of the Pematangsiantar City Regional House of Representatives. The mayor and vice mayor of Pematangsiantar are elected through general elections held every 5 years. The first mayor of Pematangsiantar was O. K. H. Salamuddin, who governed the city period from 1956 to 1957.

== List ==
The following is a list of the names of the Mayors of Pematangsiantar from time to time.

Mayor of Pematangsiantar
Num.	Portrait	Mayor	Beginning of office	End of Term	Political Party / Faction	Period	Note.	Vice mayor
1		O. K. H. Salamuddin	1956	1957	Independent	1		N/A
2		Djamaluddin Tambunan	1957	1959	Independent	2		N/A
3		Rakutta Sembiring Brahmana	1960	1964	Independent	3		N/A
4		Abner Situmorang	June 1964	August 1964	Independent	4		N/A
5		Pandak Tarigan	10 August 1964	31 August 1965	Independent	5		N/A
6		Zainuddin Hasan	31 August 1965	20 October 1966	Independent	6		N/A
7		Tarip Siregar	1 November 1966	27 December 1966	Independent	7		N/A
8		Mulatua Pardede	28 December 1966	24 April 1967	Independent	8		N/A
9		Laurimba Saragih	25 April 1967	28 June 1974	Independent	8		N/A
10		Sanggup Ketaren	29 June 1974	29 June 1979	Independent	10		N/A
11		M. J. T. Sihotang	29 June 1979	29 June 1984	Independent	11		N/A
12		Djabanten Damanik	29 June 1984	29 June 1989	Independent	12		N/A
13		Zulkifli Harahap	29 June 1989	29 June 1994	Independent	13		N/A
14		Abu Hanifah	29 June 1994	25 May 2000	Independent	14		N/A
15		Marim Purba	25 May 2000	25 May 2005	Independent	15		Kurnia Rajasyah Saragih
—		Nabari Ginting (Temporary Acting)	2 June 2005	25 August 2005	Independent	—		N/A
16		Robert Edison Siahaan	25 August 2005	25 August 2010	Independent	16 (2005)		Imal Raya Harahap
—		Donver Panggabean (Daily executive)	25 August 2010	23 September 2010	Independent	—		N/A
17		Hulman Sitorus	23 September 2010	23 September 2015	Demokrat	17 (2010)		Koni Siregar
—		Donver Panggabean (Daily executive)	23 September 2015	16 October 2015	Independent	—		N/A
—		Eddy Syofyan Purba (Acting)	16 October 2015	13 November 2015	Independent	—	(Note: Dismissed due to being involved in a corruption case involving the North Sumatra Province Social Assistance Fund.)	N/A
—		Donver Panggabean (Daily executive)	13 November 2015	8 December 2015	Independent	—		N/A
—		Jumsadi Damanik (Acting)	8 December 2015	31 October 2016	Independent	—		N/A
—		Anthony Siahaan (Acting)	31 October 2016	22 February 2017	Independent	—		N/A
—		Hefriansyah Noor (Acting Officer)	22 February 2017	10 August 2017	Demokrat	18 (2015)	(Note: Hefriansyah himself was inaugurated as Vice Mayor and took the oath of office because his partner, the elected Mayor, Hulman Sitorus, had died.)	N/A
18		Hefriansyah Noor	10 August 2017	22 February 2022	Demokrat	18 (2015)	(Note: Inaugurated as the definitive mayor to fill the power vacuum.)	Togar Sitorus (since 2018)
—		Susanti Dewayani (Acting Officer)	22 February 2022	22 August 2022	PAN	19 (2020)	(Note: Inaugurated as the official Vice Mayor, while the elected Mayor, Asner Silalahi has passed away. Susanti will then be appointed as Mayor after the appointment of the Vice Mayor.)	N/A
19		Susanti Dewayani	22 Agustus 2022	25 September 2024	PAN	19 (2020)		N/A
—		Matheos Tan (Temporary Acting)	25 September 2024	23 November 2024	Independent	19 (2020)	(Note: Susanti Dewayani is on campaign leave for the 2024 Pematangsiantar mayoral election from 25 September 2024 to 23 November 2024.)	N/A
(19)		Susanti Dewayani	23 November 2024	20 February 2025	PAN	19 (2020)		N/A
20		Wesly Silalahi	20 February 2025	Incumbent	Gerindra	20 (2024)		Herlina

== See also ==
- Pematangsiantar
- List of incumbent regional heads and deputy regional heads in North Sumatra
