= List of incumbent regional heads and deputy regional heads in North Sumatra =

The following is an article about the list of Regional Heads and Deputy Regional Heads in 33 regencies/cities in North Sumatra who are currently still serving.

== List ==
Regency/ City	Photo of the Regent/ Mayor	Regent/ Mayor	Photo of Deputy Regent/ Mayor	Deputy Regent/ Mayor	Taking Office	End of Office (Planned)	Ref.
Asahan; Regency List of Regents/Deputy Regents		Taufik Zainal Abidin		Rianto	20 February 2025	20 February 2030	
Batubara; Regency List of Regents/Deputy Regents	pus	Baharuddin Siagian	pus	Syafrizal	20 February 2025	20 February 2030	
Dairi; Regency List of Regents/Deputy Regents	pus	Vickner Sinaga	pus	Wahyu Daniel Sagala	20 February 2025	20 February 2030	
Deli Serdang; Regency List of Regents/Deputy Regents	pus	Asri Ludin Tambunan	pus	Lom Lom Suwondo	20 February 2025	20 February 2030	
Humbang Hasundutan; Regency List of Regents/Deputy Regents	pus	Oloan Paniaran Nababan	pus	Junita Rebeka Marbun	20 February 2025	20 February 2030	
Karo; Regency List of Regents/Deputy Regents	pus	Antonius Ginting	pus	Komando Tarigan	20 February 2025	20 February 2030	
Labuhanbatu; Regency List of Regents/Deputy Regents	pus	Maya Hasmita	pus	Jamri	20 February 2025	20 February 2030	
South Labuhanbatu; Regency List of Regents/Deputy Regents	pus	Fery Sahputra Simatupang	pus	Syahdian Purba Siboro	20 February 2025	20 February 2030	
North Labuhanbatu; Regency List of Regents/Deputy Regents	pus	Hendri Yanto Sitorus	pus	Samsul Tanjung	20 February 2025	20 February 2030	
Langkat; Regency List of Regents/Deputy Regents	pus	Syah Afandin	pus	Tiorita Surbakti	20 February 2025	20 February 2030	
Mandailing Natal; Regency List of Regents/Deputy Regents	pus	Saipullah Nasution	pus	Atikah Azmi Utammi	21 March 2025	21 March 2030	
Nias; Regency List of Regents/Deputy Regents	pus	Ya'atulo Gulo	pus	Arota Lase	20 February 2025	20 February 2030	
West Nias; Regency List of Regents/Deputy Regents	pus	Eliyunus Waruwu	pus	Sozisokhi Hia	20 February 2025	20 February 2030	
South Nias; Regency List of Regents/Deputy Regents	pus	Sokhiatulo Laia	pus	Yusuf Nache	20 February 2025	20 February 2030	
North Nias; Regency List of Regents/Deputy Regents	pus	Amizaro Waruwu	pus	Yusman Zega	20 February 2025	20 February 2030	
Padang Lawas; Regency List of Regents/Deputy Regents	pus	Putra Mahkota Alam Hasibuan	pus	Achmad Fauzan Nasution	20 February 2025	20 February 2030	
North Padang Lawas; Regency List of Regents/Deputy Regents	pus	Reski Basyah Harahap	pus	Basri Harahap	20 February 2025	20 February 2030	
Pakpak Bharat; Regency List of Regents/Deputy Regents	pus	Franc Bernhard Tumanggor	pus	Mutsyuhito Solin	20 February 2025	20 February 2030	
Samosir; Regency List of Regents/Deputy Regents	pus	Vandiko Timotius Gultom	pus	Ariston Tua Sidauruk	20 February 2025	20 February 2030	
Serdang Bedagai; Regency List of Regents/Deputy Regents		Darma Wijaya		Adlin Umar Yusri Tambunan	20 February 2025	20 February 2030	
Simalungun; Regency List of Regents/Deputy Regents	pus	Anton Achmad Saragih	pus	Benny Gusman Sinaga	20 February 2025	20 February 2030	
South Tapanuli; Regency List of Regents/Deputy Regents	pus	Gus Irawan Pasaribu	pus	Jafar Syahbuddin Ritonga	20 February 2025	20 February 2030	
Central Tapanuli; Regency List of Regents/Deputy Regents	pus	Masinton Pasaribu	pus	Mahmud Efendi Lubis	20 February 2025	20 February 2030	
North Tapanuli; Regency List of Regents/Deputy Regents	pus	Jonius Taripar Parsaoran Hutabarat	pus	Deni Parlindungan Lumbantoruan	20 February 2025	20 February 2030	
Toba; Regency List of Regents/Deputy Regents	pus	Effendi Sintong Panangian Napitupulu	pus	Audi Murphy Sitorus	20 February 2025	20 February 2030	
Binjai; City List of Mayors/Deputy mayors	pus	Amir Hamzah	pus	Hasanul Jihadi	20 February 2025	20 February 2030	
Gunungsitoli; City List of Mayors/Deputy mayors	pus	Sowa'a Laoli	pus	Marthinus Lase	20 February 2025	20 February 2030	
Medan; City List of Mayors/Deputy mayors	pus	Rico Tri Putra Bayu Waas	pus	Zakiyuddin Harahap	20 February 2025	20 February 2030	
Padangsidimpuan; City List of Mayors/Deputy mayors	pus	Letnan Dalimunthe	pus	Harry Pahlevi Harahap	20 February 2025	20 February 2030	
Pematangsiantar; City List of Mayors/Deputy mayors	pus	Wesly Silalahi	pus	Herlina	20 February 2025	20 February 2030	
Sibolga; City List of Mayors/Deputy mayors	pus	Ahmad Syukri Nazri Penarik	pus	Pantas Maruba Lumbantobing	20 February 2025	20 February 2030	
Tanjungbalai; City List of Mayors/Deputy mayors	pus	Mahyaruddin Salim	pus	Fadly Abdina	20 February 2025	20 February 2030	
Tebing Tinggi; City List of Mayors/Deputy mayors	pus	Iman Irdian Saragih	pus	Chairil Mukmin Tambunan	20 February 2025	20 February 2030	

Notes

- "Commencement of office" is the inauguration date at the beginning or during the current term of office. For acting regents/mayors, it is the date of appointment or extension as acting regent/mayor.
- Based on the Constitutional Court decision Number 27/PUU-XXII/2024, the Governor and Deputy Governor, Regent and Deputy Regent, and Mayor and Deputy Mayor elected in 2020 shall serve until the inauguration of the Governor and Deputy Governor, Regent and Deputy Regent, and Mayor and Deputy Mayor elected in the 2024 national simultaneous elections as long as the term of office does not exceed 5 (five) years.

== See also ==
- North Sumatra
