= Saragih =

Batak surname originating in Indonesia

Saragih is one of Simalungun Batak clans originating in North Sumatra, Indonesia. People of this clan bear the clan's name as their surname. Notable people of this clan include:

- Bill Saragih (1933-2008), Indonesian jazz musician
- Eni Maulani Saragih (born 1970), Indonesian politician
- Feri Aman Saragih (born 1988), Indonesian professional footballer
- Jeka Saragih (born 1995), Indonesian mixed martial artist
- Laurimba Saragih (1927-2011), Indonesian politician
