= Mayor of Binjai =

- Wali Kota Binjai
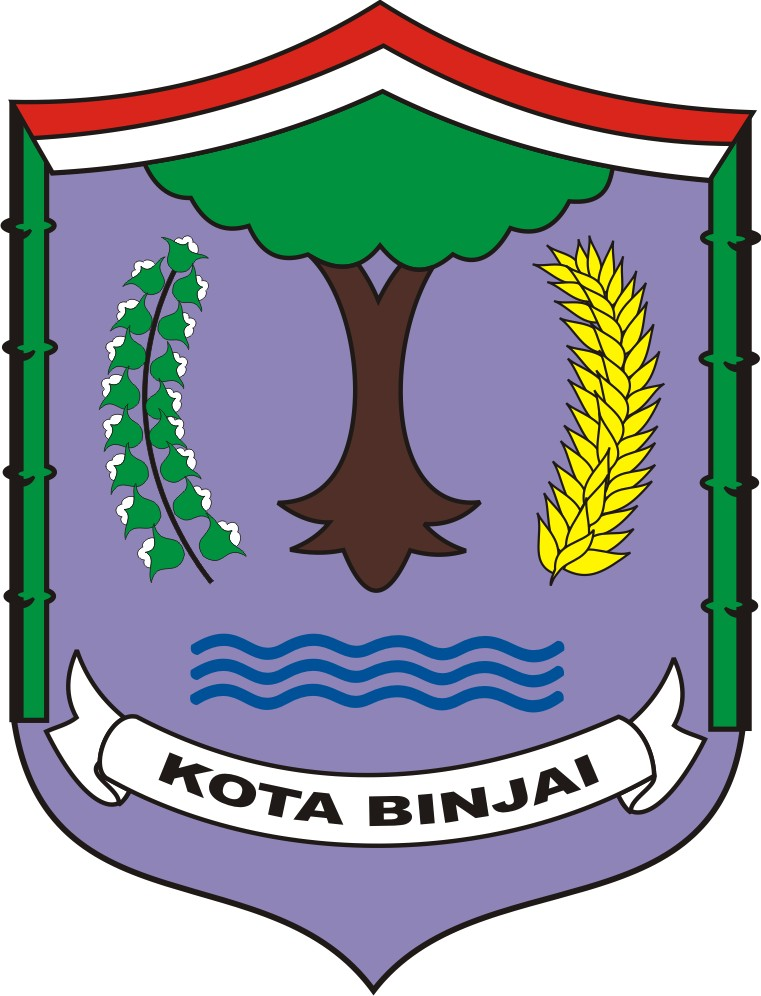
- Coat of arms of Binjai

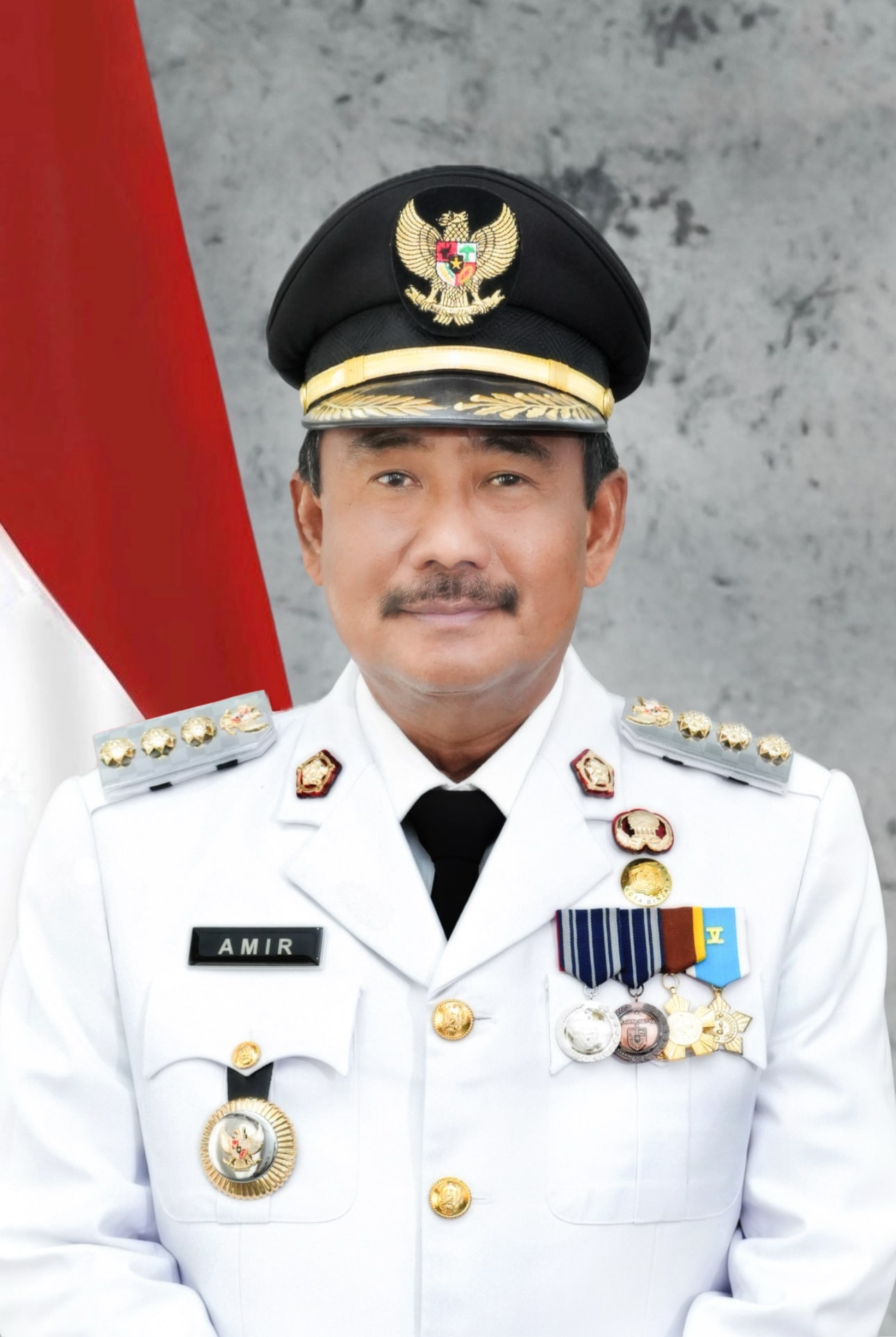
- Incumbent; Amir Hamzah since 26 April 2021
- Term length: 5 years
- Inaugural holder: J. Runnanbi
- Formation: 1944
- Website: Official website

Mayor of Binjai is the head of the second-level region who holds the government in Binjai together with the Vice Mayor and 35 members of the Binjai City Regional House of Representatives. The mayor and vice mayor of Binjai are elected through general elections held every 5 years. The first mayor of Binjai was J. Runnanbi, who governed the city period from 1944 to 1945.

== List ==
The following is a list of the names of the Mayors of Binjai from time to time.

Mayor of Binjai
Num.	Portrait	Mayor	Beginning of office	End of Term	Political Party / Faction	Period	Note.	Vice mayor
—		J. Runnanbi	1944	1945	Independent	–	(Note: Executive Board)	N/A
1		R. M. Ibnoe	1945	1947	Independent	1	(Note: Head of Government)	N/A
2		J. Bunger	1947	1948	Independent	2		N/A
3		A. S. C. More	1948	1950	Independent	3		N/A
4		O. K. Salamuddin	1950	1953	Independent	4		N/A
5		T. Ubaidullah	1953	1956	Independent	5		N/A
6		S. S. Paruhuman	1956	1960	Independent	6	(Note: As an autonomous region.)	N/A
7		Abdullah Rayni	1960	1966	Independent	7		N/A
8		Azhari Pulungan	1966	1968	Independent	8		N/A
9		Amanan	1968	1973	Independent	9		N/A
10		Mulai Sebayang	1973	1978	Independent	10		N/A
11		A. Soepomo	1978	1984	Independent	11		N/A
12		Syarifuddin	1984	1989	Independent	12		N/A
13		R. J. Hadi Siswoyo Al Haj	1989	1994	Independent	13		N/A
14		Abadi Barus	1994	1999	Independent	14		N/A
15		Ali Umri	2000	2005	Golkar	15		Anhar A. Monel
15		Ali Umri	2005	2010	Golkar	16 (2005)		Anhar A. Monel
16		Muhammad Idaham	2010	2015	Independent	17 (2010)		Timbas Tarigan
16		Muhammad Idaham	17 February 2016	17 February 2021	Independent	18 (2015)		Timbas Tarigan
N/A			26 February 2021	5 March 2021	—	19 (2020)	(Note: Mayor-elect Juliadi died on 9 February 2021 before being inaugurated.)	Amir Hamzah
17	al=Drs. H. Amir Hamzah, M.AP	Amir Hamzah	26 April 2021	20 February 2025	Demokrat	19 (2020)		Rizky Yunanda Sitepu (2021–2025)
17	al=Drs. H. Amir Hamzah, M.AP	Amir Hamzah	20 February 2025	Incumbent	Demokrat	20 (2024)		Hasanul Jihadi

== Temporary replacement ==
In the government stack, a regional head who submits himself to leave or temporarily resigns from his position to the central government, then the Minister of Home Affairs prepares a replacement who is a bureaucrat in the regional government or even a vice mayor, including when the mayor's position is in a transition period.

Portrait	Mayor	Party	Beginning	End	Duration	Period	Definitive	Ref.
	Elyuzar (Daily executive)	Independent	12 August 2015	28 September 2015	47 days	–	Transition (2015–2016)	
	Riadil Akhir Lubis (Acting)	Independent	28 September 2015	17 February 2016	142 days	–	Transition (2015–2016)	
	Mahfullah Pratama Daulay (Daily executive)	Independent	17 February 2021	26 February 2021	9 days	–	Transition (2021)	
al=Drs. H. Amir Hamzah, M.AP	Amir Hamzah (Acting Officer)	Demokrat	5 March 2021	26 April 2021	52 days	19 (2020)	–	
	Rizky Yunanda Sitepu (Acting Officer)	Golkar	25 September 2024	23 November 2024	59 days	19 (2020)	Amir Hamzah	(Note: Amir Hamzah is on campaign leave for the 2024 Binjai mayoral election from 25 September 2024 to 23 November 2024.)

== See also ==
- Binjai
- List of incumbent regional heads and deputy regional heads in North Sumatra
