= Djabanten Damanik =

Indonesian political candidate

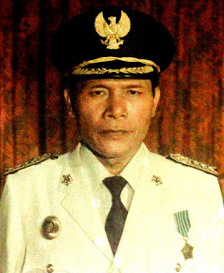

Regent of Simalungun
- In office 3 September 1990 – 3 September 2000
- Governor: Raja Inal Siregar; Tengku Rizal Nurdin
- Preceded by: Johan Pandapotan Silitonga
- Succeeded by: Jhon Hugo Silalahi

Mayor of Pematangsiantar
- In office 19 June 1984 – 19 June 1989
- Governor: Kaharuddin Nasution
- Preceded by: MJT. Sihotang
- Succeeded by: Zulkifli Harahap

Personal details
- Born: July 16, 1935 Sipolha, Simalungun Regency, Dutch East Indies
- Died: October 25, 2006 (aged 71) Indonesia
- Party: Golkar
- Education: Home Governance Academy (APDN) Malang

Djabanten Damanik (16 July 1935 – 25 October 2006) was an Indonesian bureaucrat who served as mayor of Pematangsiantar from 1984 to 1989 and regent of Simalungun for a decade from 1990 to 2000. A career civil servant, Djabanten had held several prominent offices within the provincial government before being elected to lead these region by their respective councils.

== Early life and education ==
Born in the Sipolha locality of Simalungun Regency on 16 July 1935, Djabanten was the son of Tuan Sakkuda Humala Damanik, the 16th and last ruler (partongah) of the sub-kingdom (partuanon) of Sipolha. The partuanon ceased to exist along with other polities in 1946 following the East Sumatra revolution that dismantled aristocracy in the region. During the chaos that ensued, Djabanten's father was killed by the Harimau Liar paramilitary group led by Saragih Ras. Djabanten studied at the Home Governance Academy in Malang, where he became a member of the academy's student senate.

== Career ==
Djabanten's bureaucratic career began in West Irian, where his service earned him several awards from the government, including the Satya Lencana Satya Dharma (West Guinea Military Campaign Medal) in 1962 and the Satya Dharma Trikora (Trikora Military Campaign Medal) in 1967. He also received a commendation as a "capable" and "loved" civil servant from the West Irian resident in 1963.

By the mid-1970s, Djabanten had returned to his hometown, serving as the regional secretary of Simalungun since 2 October 1975, serving under regent Bonifacius F. Silalahi. On 30 September 1978, he was briefly entrusted to provisionally serve as the regent. His term ended following his reassigment to the North Sumatra provincial government, being appointed as the chief of organization and administration affairs on 20 February 1981 and then as the assistant for social welfare affairs to the governor on 22 March 1984.

His term as social welfare assistant was cut short, as on 19 June 1984 he took on the role as the Mayor of Pematangsiantar after being nominally elected by the city council. He was replaced in his old office by Abdul Wahab Dalimunthe on 2 July. During his mayoralty, he focused on transforming the city into a hub for education and services, emphasizing public space management and fostering inter-ethnic tolerance. After his term ended, Djabanten was appointed as the chief of North Sumatra social services on 4 September 1989. During his brief stint, which lasted exactly a year, Djabanten reported the number of homeless people and beggars to the North Sumatra provincial representative council.

In August 1990, Djabanten was named as a strong candidate for the regent of Simalungun, after reports that he had received backing from the home minister. He was eventually elected by the local council with 33 out of 43 votes, defeating local officials who only received 7 and 3 votes each. He was installed by governor Raja Inal Siregar on 3 September. Several months before the end of his first term, Djabanten tendered his formal resignation on 27 February 1995. Despite this, Djabanten received widespread support from organizations and influential individuals for his reelection, with at least 25 letters of recommendation being sent to the regional council and the governor by May. Djabanten was installed for his second term on the 4th of September.

Shortly after his second inauguration, Djabanten announced a massive personnel reshuffle within his administration. His decade-long rule in Simalungun was characterized by massive infrastructure development in rural areas (nagori) and the strengthening of the region's status as the "breadbasket" of North Sumatra through improved irrigation and agricultural counseling. He oversaw the historic transition of the regency's capital to Pamatang Raya and founded the SMA Plus Pematang Raya.

Djabanten's position was also double hatted with the chairman of the Simalungun University foundation, during which he garnered attention for dismissing the university's rector following an internal conflict within the university. He also held leadership of several Simalungun local organizations, including the Simalungun Veteran Legion and the '45 Movement from 1990 to 2004, as well as chairing Simalungun's customary council, the Majelis Hapartuanon Nabolon, in 2005.

He died on 25 October 2006 and was buried at his hometown in Sipolha. In 2022, Simalungun regent Radiapoh Sinaga initiated the restoration of his grave. The Simalungun government named the central hall of its office in his honor, but was renamed in 2026 to the Rondahaim Saragih hall under regent Anton Achmad Saragih, sparking controversy and censure from Saragih family members.
