= Muhammad Al Khadziq =

Indonesian politician (born 1967)

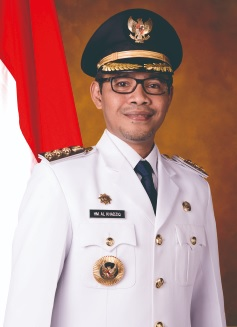

Regent of Temanggung
- In office 24 September 2018 – 25 September 2023
- Governor: Ganjar Pranowo
- Deputy: Heri Ibnu Wibowo
- Preceded by: Bambang Sukarno

Personal details
- Born: 30 December 1967 (age 57); Temanggung, Indonesia
- Political party: Golkar
- Children: 2

Muhammad Al Khadziq (born 30 December 1967) is an Indonesian politician and former journalist who was the regent of Temanggung, Central Java, between 2018 and 2023. Before being elected as the leader of his home regency, he had been active at various Islamic organizations both during and after his studies.

== Early life and education ==
Al Khadziq was born in Temanggung on 30 December 1967. After completing his elementary and middle school in Temanggung, he went to a pesantren for 2 years before continuing to a state-funded madrasa for his final 3 years of basic education.

After graduating from the madrasa, he was active at various Islamic student organizations, including the Ansor Youth Movement. He studied philosophy at the Sunan Kalijaga State Islamic University.

== Career ==
Following his education, he worked as an editor at Yogya Pos (1995-1998) and later Jawa Pos (1998-2002). He became the chief editor for Nahdlatul Ulama paper Duta Masyarakat between 2002 and 2004. After journalism, he became a consultant, working for the Ministry of Disadvantaged Regions between 2004 and 2006. Afterwards, he became a public relations consultant, in addition to heading the editorial board of the magazine Event Guide. He was also part of the central committee of the Ansor Youth Movement.

Politically, he had joined the Democratic Party, United Development Party and the National Awakening Party before his marriage, after which he joined Golkar. He ran in Temanggung's 2018 regency election with Heri Ibnu Wibowo as his running mate and parties Gerindra, PPP, Golkar, and PAN supporting him, with the pair ending up winning 54.3 percent of the votes (258,734) in a three-candidate race against the incumbent regent and vice-regent (who ran separately).

He was sworn in by governor Ganjar Pranowo on 24 September 2018.

His first term ended on 25 September 2023, and he was replaced by Hary Agung Prabowo as acting regent. He ran for a second term in the 2024 regency election, but was defeated by Agus Setyawan.

== Family ==
His wife Eni Maulani Saragih is a member of the People's Representative Council. In 2018, she was arrested by the Corruption Eradication Commission and Khadziq was examined as a witness. The couple has two children.
