= Damanik =

Batak surname originating in Indonesia

Damanik is one of Simalungun Batak clans originating in North Sumatra, Indonesia. People of this clan bear the clan's name as their surname. Notable people of this clan include:

- Djabanten Damanik (1935–2006), Indonesian bureaucrat and politician
- Ferdinand Damanik (born 1988), Indonesian basketball player
