= Eni Maulani Saragih =

Indonesian politician

Member of People's Representative Council
- In office 2 October 2014 – 21 November 2018
- Succeeded by: Edy Kuntadi
- Constituency: East Java 10

Personal details
- Born: 13 May 1970 (age 54); Jakarta

Eni Maulani Saragih (born 13 May 1970) is an Indonesian politician who was a member of the People's Representative Council. She was first elected in the 2014 legislative election as a member of Golkar. She was arrested by the Corruption Eradication Commission in 2018, being accused of having accepted bribery, and was imprisoned until 2022.

== Background ==
Eni was born in Jakarta on 13 May 1970. She completed her elementary and middle school in West Jakarta, and her high school at SMA Negeri 70 Jakarta. She later graduated from IKIP Jakarta (today Jakarta State University) in 1994, from an economic institute in 2008, and earned a masters from Trisakti University in 2013.

== Career ==
In the 2014 legislative election, she was elected to the People's Representative Council as a member of Golkar after winning 84.837 votes. She represented the 10th East Java constituency, which included the regencies of Lamongan and Gresik. She was appointed as the deputy chairman of the parliament's seventh commission in April 2018, after previously being assigned to the second commission.

=== Arrest ===
On 13 July 2018, the Corruption Eradication Commission (KPK) apprehended Eni at the home of Social Minister Idrus Marham, along with 8 others. She was named a suspect and accused of having received bribes related to the construction of a coal-powered power plant in Riau, and that Social Minister Idrus Marham was heavily involved. KPK later named Idrus as a suspect as well, prompting his resignation.

She returned Rp 500 million (US$34,000) to investigators and was reportedly being cooperative, with her proposing to be a justice collaborator. She was sentenced to six years in prison in March 2019. Her replacement Edy Kuntadi was sworn into the parliament on 21 November 2018. On 17 August 2022, she received a remission due to Indonesia's independence day, and she was released on the same day.

== Family ==
She is married to M Al Khadziq, who was elected as the regent of Temanggung in 2018. The couple has three children.
