= Binjai City Regional House of Representatives =

Binjai City Regional House of Representatives Dewan Perwakilan Rakyat Daerah Kota Binjai
- 2024–2029 period

Type
- Type: Unicameral
- Term limits: 5 years

History
- New session started: 17 September 2024

Leadership
- Speaker: Hj. Kristiana Gusuartini, Golkar since 3 June 2025
- 1st Vice Speaker: H. Juli Sawitma Nasution, S.H., M.H., Demokrat since 4 November 2024
- 2nd Vice Speaker: Hairil Anwar, S.Pd.I., PKS since 4 November 2024

Structure
- Seats: 35
- Political groups: Gerindra (4) PDI-P (5) Golkar (6) NasDem (4) PKS (6) PAN (3) Demokrat (6) PPP (1)

Elections
- Voting system: Open list
- Last election: 14 February 2024

Meeting place
- Binjai City Regional House of Representatives Building; Veteran Street Number 9 Tangsi, Binjai Kota, Binjai; North Sumatra, Indonesia

The Binjai City Regional House of Representatives is the unicameral municipal legislature of Binjai, North Sumatra, Indonesia. It has 35 members, who are elected every five years, simultaneously with the national legislative election.

== Legal basis ==
The legislature for Binjai was formed along with those of other cities in North Sumatra under Law Number 9 of 1956, which organized city governments within the province.

== General election results ==
=== 2024 Indonesian legislative election ===
The official valid votes received by political parties contesting the 2024 Indonesian legislative election in each electoral district (constituency) for members of the Binjai City Regional House of Representatives are as follows.

2024 Indonesian legislative election results

Electoral district	PKB	Gerindra	PDI-P	Golkar	NasDem	Labour	Gelora	PKS	PKN	Hanura	Garuda	PAN	PBB	Democratic	PSI	Perindo	PPP	Ummat	Valid votes
Binjai City 1	139	463	2,775	2,458	3,524	10	22	1,377	2	37	0	2,543	31	3,482	335	35	487	51	17,771
Binjai City 2	395	4,400	4,238	4,249	2,517	48	69	2,036	4	317	0	934	31	5,388	97	28	1,518	204	26,473
Binjai City 3	944	4,558	3,109	9,541	1,868	34	301	9,964	8	302	0	4,736	125	9,080	296	44	1,386	383	46,679
Binjai City 4	1,331	5,012	2,633	8,057	2,597	51	179	4,051	6	45	0	2,877	2,303	3,158	163	43	1,690	121	34,317
Binjai City 5	751	3,753	4,175	5,088	2,894	68	153	2,323	3	596	0	1,968	32	6,234	124	992	3,995	191	33,340
Total	3,560	18,186	16,930	29,393	13,400	211	724	19,751	23	1,297	0	13,058	2,522	27,342	1,015	1,142	9,076	950	158,580
Source: General Elections Commission of Indonesia

== Composition ==
The following is the composition of members of the Binjai City Regional House of Representatives in the last three periods.

Party	Total seats		
Party	2014–2019	2019–2024	2024–2029
Gerindra seats	4	▲5	▼4
PDI-P seats	3	▲4	▲5
Golkar seats	5	▲6	6
NasDem seats	3	3	▲4
PKS seats	2	▲3	▲6
Hanura seats	3	▼1	▼0
PAN seats	3	3	3
Demokrat seats	4	▼3	▲6
PPP seats	3	▼2	▼1
Total Seats	30	30	▲35
Total Party	9	9	▼8

== Electoral District ==
In the 2019 Legislative Election, the Binjai City Regional House of Representatives election was divided into 4 electoral districts as follows:

Electoral District Name	Electoral District Area	Number of Seats
BINJAI CITY 1	Binjai Kota, Binjai Barat	9
BINJAI CITY 2	Binjai Utara	8
BINJAI CITY 3	Binjai Timur	7
BINJAI CITY 4	Binjai Selatan	6
TOTAL		30

In the 2024 Legislative Election, the Binjai City Regional House of Representatives election was divided into 5 electoral districts as follows:

Electoral District Name	Electoral District Area	Number of Seats
BINJAI CITY 1	Binjai Kota	4
BINJAI CITY 2	Binjai Barat	6
BINJAI CITY 3	Binjai Utara	10
BINJAI CITY 4	Binjai Timur	8
BINJAI CITY 5	Binjai Selatan	7
TOTAL		35

== See also ==
- North Sumatra Regional House of Representatives
- Binjai
- North Sumatra
