= Laurimba Saragih =

Lieutenant Colonel Laurimba Saragih
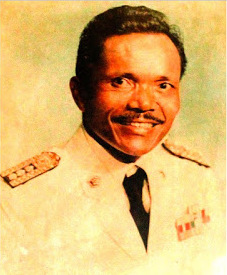

Speaker of the Regional People's Representative Council of Pematangsiantar
- In office 1987–1992

Mayor of Pematangsiantar
- In office 25 April 1967 – 28 June 1974
- Preceded by: Mulatua Pardede
- Succeeded by: Sanggup Ketaren

Personal details
- Born: 27 September 1927 Tanggabatu, Haranggaol, Dutch East Indies
- Died: 7 June 2011 (aged 83) Pematangsiantar, North Sumatra, Indonesia

Military service
- Allegiance: Indonesia
- Branch/service: Army
- Years of service: 1943—1967
- Rank: Lieutenant Colonel
- Battles/wars: Indonesian National Revolution; Revolutionary Government of the Republic of Indonesia; Indonesian mass killings of 1965–66

Laurimba Saragih (27 September 1927 – 7 June 2011) was an Indonesian politician and military person who became the Mayor of Pematangsiantar from 25 April 1967 to 28 June 1974.

== Early life ==
Saragih was born on 27 September 1927 in Tanggabatu, Haranggaol, Dutch East Indies.

== Career ==
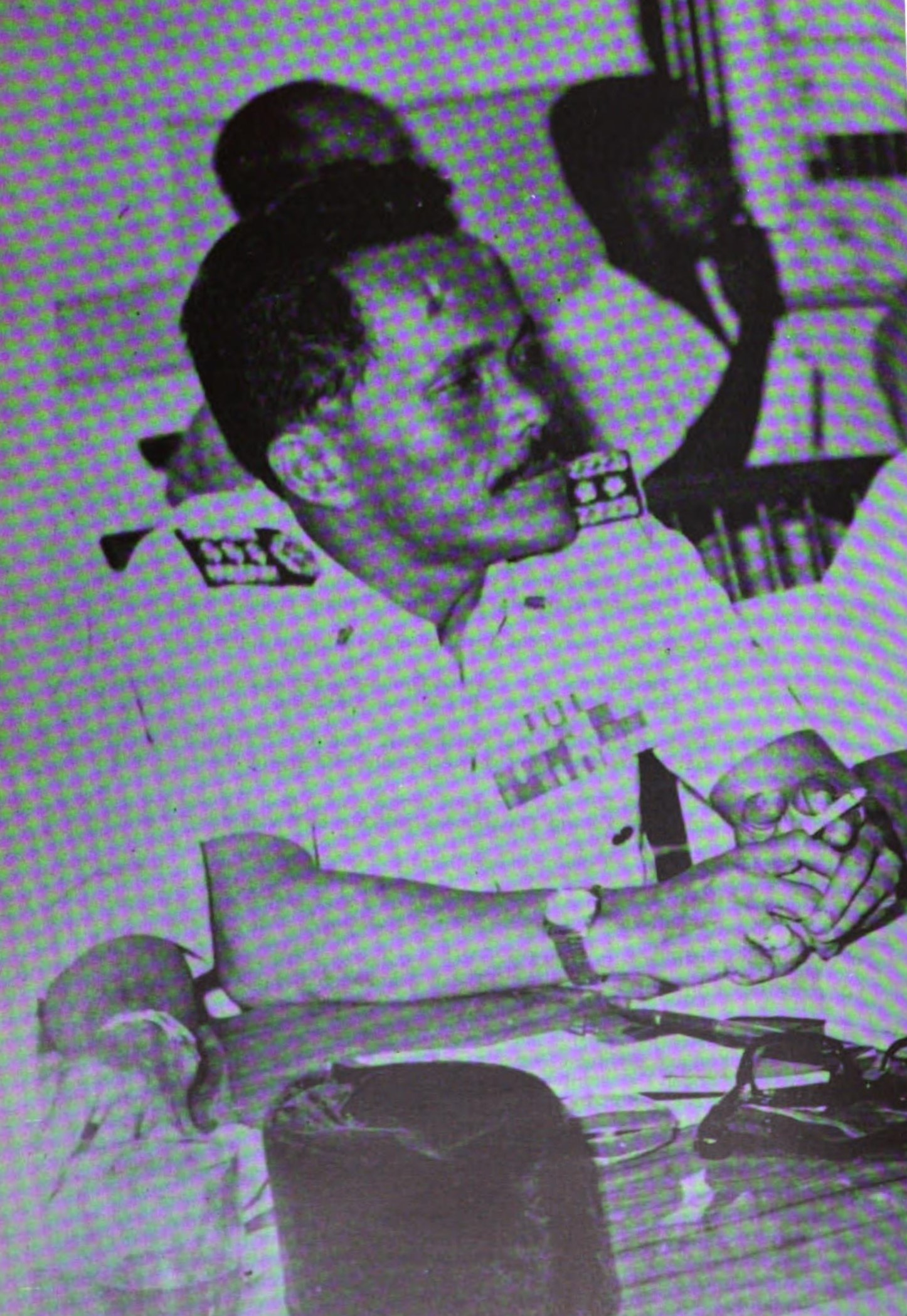
Laurimba Saragih in a meeting.

Saragih began his military career during the Japanese Occupation of the Dutch East Indies. He supported the Indonesian government during the period of the State of East Sumatra and the Revolutionary Government of the Republic of Indonesia. In 1965, he became the Commander of the Section 1 in the Military District Commander, and participated in the Indonesian mass killings of 1965–66.

He was inaugurated as the Mayor of Pematangsiantar on 25 April 1967. He ended his term on 28 June 1974. In 1985, he was appointed as the chairman for the Golkar branch in Pematangsiantar.

He was elected by the Regional People's Representative Council of Pematangsiantar as its speaker. During this term, he introduced the slogan Sipangambei Manoktok Hitei, which was the free translation of the national motto of Indonesia, Bhinneka Tunggal Ika, in the Simalungun language.

== Later life ==
He died at the age of 84 on 27 June 2011 at the Horas Insani Hospital in Pematangsiantar. He was treated for respiratory problems and high fever since two days before his death.

According to his family, Saragih was a heavy smoker, and he began to stopped smoking after he returned from umrah in 2009.

== Personal life ==
Saragih was married to Darijah Hasvy Hutasuhut.
