= Wesly Silalahi =

Indonesian politician

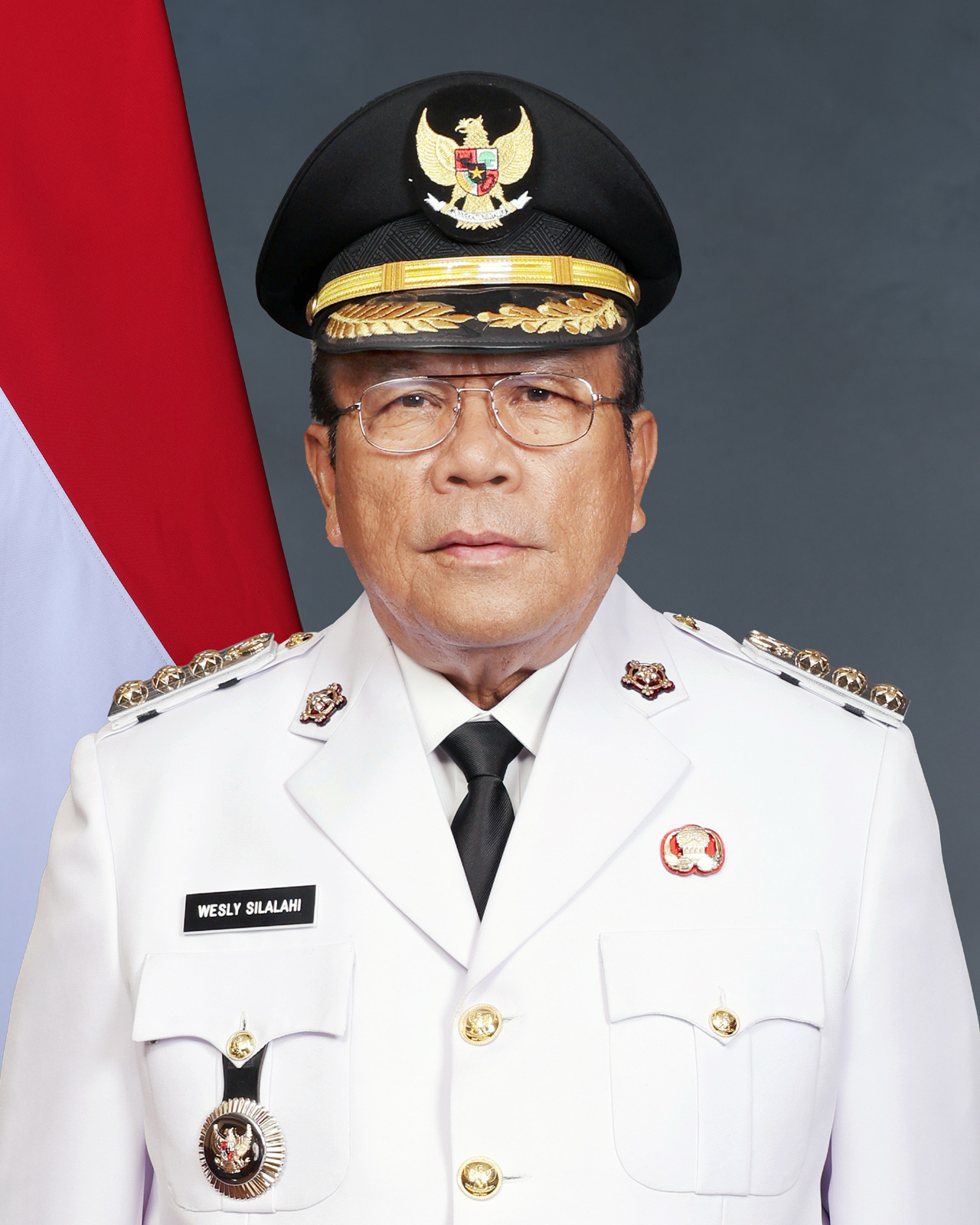

Mayor of Pematangsiantar
- Incumbent
- Assumed office 20 February 2025
- President: Prabowo Subianto
- Governor: Bobby Nasution
- Lieutenant: Herlina
- Preceded by: Susanti Dewayani

Personal details
- Born: 12 October 1959 (age 66) Pematangsiantar, North Sumatra, Indonesia
- Spouse: Liswaty Sinaga
- Education: University of Indonesia

Wesly Silalahi (born 12 October 1959) is an Indonesian politician and professional. Originally from Pematangsiantar, North Sumatra, Silalahi has pursued education and professional interests across multiple fields, including economics, law, notary practice, and various business ventures. He is currently serving as the Mayor of Pematangsiantar since 2025.

== Early life and education ==
Wesly Silalahi was born in Pematangsiantar on 12 October 1959 to Wongso Silalahi, a retired employee of the Simalungun Regency government, and Aminah Boru Sinaga. Silalahi spent his childhood in his birthplace, attending the 56th Pematangsiantar Elementary School from 1965 to 1971. He continued his studies at a Catholic middle school in Pematangsiantar and later at the 2nd Pematangsiantar State High School from 1975 to 1977.

In 1978, Silalahi relocated to Jakarta to study economics at the University of Indonesia, graduating in 1983. Years later, he returned to the same university to pursue a law degree between 2003 and 2008 and further specialized in law by completing a master of notary degree from 2010 to 2013.

== Career ==
Silalahi began his professional career in 1985 as General Manager of Marketing for the power plant division at PT. Sunggal Mas Rayindonusa, a role he held until 1990. In 1989, he joined a partnership program with the State Electricity Company aimed at rural electrification, working on providing electricity infrastructure to remote and underdeveloped areas of Indonesia until 1996. In 1991, Silalahi became the sole agent for the generating set division of United Tractors, working specifically with the State Electricity Company until 2000. In 1992, he assumed the role of President Director at Asih Silapurna company, a position he has held since. By 1996, Silalahi expanded his business interests, co-founding the Tenindo Cakar Utama company and serving as its commissioner.

Between 1996 and 2000, Silalahi contributed to the Regional Environmental Laboratory Development (RELD) project, a government-to-government collaboration between Indonesia and Australia, which focused on environmental preservation and pollution reduction across Indonesian provinces. During this period, he also engaged in various other business ventures, including a long-standing contract between the Asih Silapurna and Tambang Putih company, beginning in 1997.

In the 2000s, Silalahi continued to take on new roles, becoming commissioner at Manggala Purnama Sakti in 2002, and at Sinar Prapanca Security Services in 2008. By 2010, he was participating in a partnership program with the State Electricity Company and Tenindo Cakar Utama, focusing on strengthening power systems in the Jakarta metropolitan area through 2014. At the same time, he established himself as a land deed official in Bekasi, beginning in 2014. In 2013, he also became a commissioner at PT. Gogo Travel.

Alongside his business activities, Silalahi has been active in national sports organizations. He served as treasurer for the Indonesian Wrestling Association (PGSI) and was involved with the central committee of the National Sports Committee of Indonesia (KONI).

== Electoral career ==
=== 2015 Pematangsiantar election ===
Wesly’s first major foray into politics was in the 2015 Pematangsiantar mayoral election. At that time, he ran with Salianto as his running mate. Their campaign was supported by the Indonesian Democratic Party of Struggle, the Indonesian Justice and Unity Party, and the Prosperous Justice Party. Despite this backing, the pair received 25,609 votes, failing to secure a win. After the election, Wesly and his team challenged the results by filing a dispute with the Constitutional Court, but their efforts did not change the outcome.

=== 2019 and 2024 legislative election ===
In the 2019 legislative election, he ran as a candidate for the Indonesian House of Representatives representing North Sumatra’s 3rd electoral district. He was supported by PDIP. However, he only managed to secure 14,097 votes and failed to earn a seat in the national parliament. He ran again in the 2024 legislative election with the support of the Gerindra Party representing North Sumatra’s 3rd district. He also failed to secure a seat in his second attempt, with a total vote of 21,599.

== Mayor of Pematangsiantar ==
Wesly ran as the candidate for mayor in the 2024 local election with Herlina as his running mate. Their ticket was supported by Gerindra Party, Democratic Party, NasDem Party, and Gelora Party. He won the election with 49,017 votes, or 42,32% of the total votes. He was installed along with most other regional leaders elected in 2024 on 20 February 2025.

== Personal life ==
Wesly Silalahi is married to Liswaty Sinaga.
