= Pematangsiantar =

City in North Sumatra, Indonesia

- City
- City of Pematangsiantar; Kota Pematangsiantar

Other transcription(s)
  - Batak: ᯈᯩᯕᯖᯰᯙᯫᯁᯉ᯳ᯖᯓ᯳
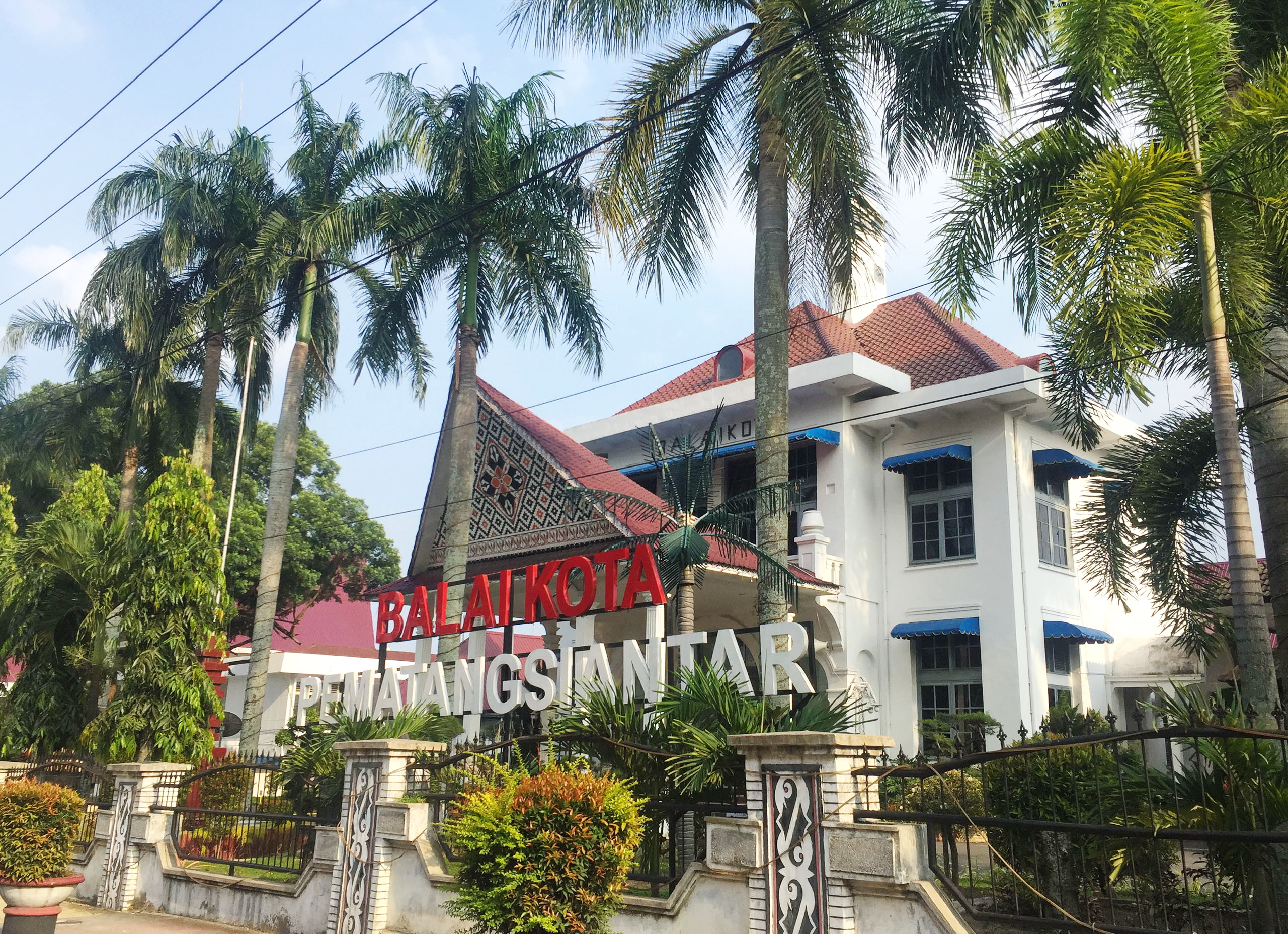
- Pematangsiantar City Hall

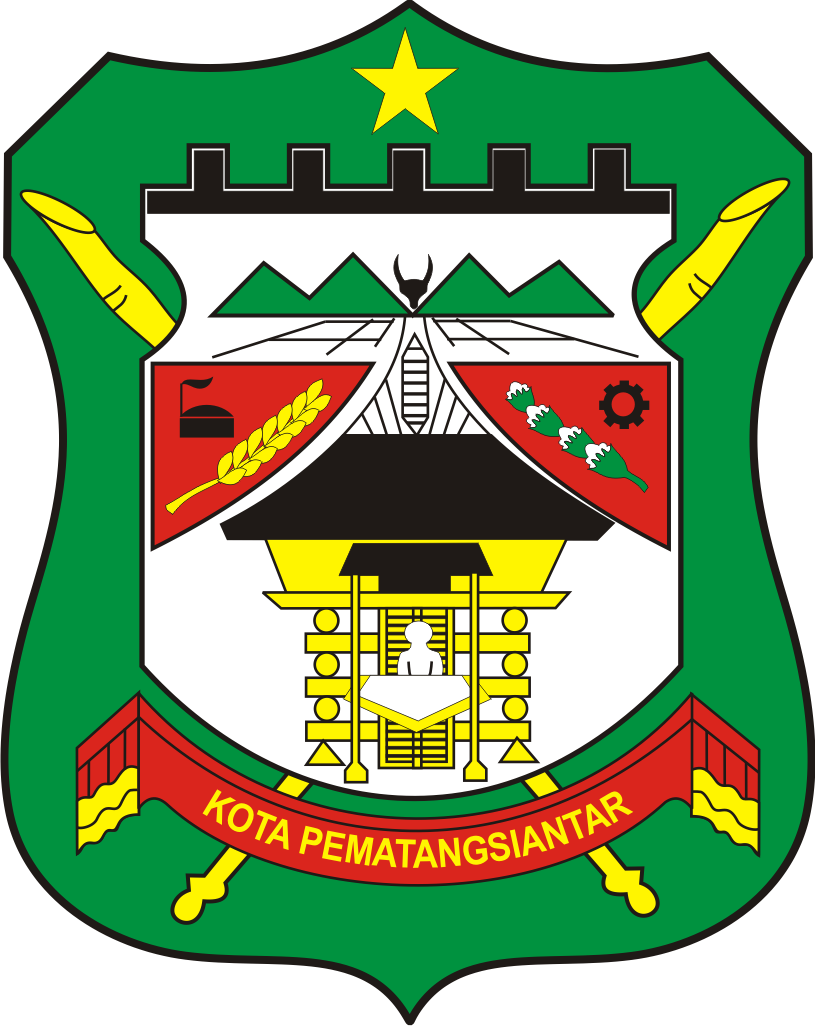
- Coat of arms
- Motto: ᯃᯬᯖ ᯈᯩᯕᯖᯰᯙᯫᯁᯉ᯳ᯖᯓ᯳ (Sapangambei Manoktok Hitei)
- Location within North Sumatra

- Location in Sumatra and Indonesia Pematangsiantar (Indonesia)
- Coordinates: 2°57′36″N 99°3′36″E
- Country: Indonesia
- Province: North Sumatra

Government
  - Mayor: Wesly Silalahi
  - Vice Mayor: Herlina
  - Speaker of City Council: Timbul Marganda Lingga (PDI-P)
  - Deputy Speaker of City Council: Mangatas Maruli Tua Silalahi (Golkar) and Ronald Darwin Tampubolon (People's Conscience Party)

Area
  - Total: 79.971 km^{2} (30.877 sq mi)

Population (mid 2025 estimate)
  - Total: 279,198
  - Density: 3,491.2/km^{2} (9,042.3/sq mi)
- Time zone: UTC+7 (Indonesia Western Time)
- Area code: (+62) 622
- Website: www.pematangsiantarkota.go.id

Pematangsiantar (Simalungun Batak pronunciation: [pə.ma.taŋ.si.an.tar]) (sometimes written as Pematang Siantar, acronym PS or P. Siantar, colloquially just Siantar), and also known as the City of Pematangsiantar, is an independent city in North Sumatra Province of Indonesia, surrounded by, but not part of, the Simalungun Regency, making Pematangsiantar an enclave within Simalungun Regency. Pematangsiantar formerly had the status of a second-level district (daerah tingkat dua) and was the administrative centre of the surrounding Regency, but in 1986 it was elevated to Kota (City) and separated from the Regency.

Its population was 229,525 in the 2005 Intermediate Census, 234,698 in the 2010 Census and 268,254 in the 2020 Census. The official estimate as of mid 2025 was 279,198 (comprising 138,049 males and 141,149 females), making it the second-largest city in the province after the provincial capital of Medan. In addition to the areas within the city limits, the neighbouring district (kecamatan) of Siantar immediately to the east and south is administratively a part of Simalungun Regency and contains the eastern suburbs of the city; it covers 73.99 km^{2} and had a population at the 2020 Census of 73,536, but this declined to 68,037 by mid 2025.

Pematangsiantar is 128 km from Medan and 50 km from the renowned Lake Toba tourist centre of Parapat and is often a transit city for tourists who want to travel to Lake Toba and Central Tapanuli Regency. As a city that supports tourism in the surrounding area, the city has 8 hotels, 10 budget hotels, and 268 restaurants. There are still many old (1950s) model English-manufactured Birmingham Small Arms Company (BSA) motorcycles with a capacity of 500 cc used as Auto rickshaws which are recognized by their distinctive loud sound.

The city received the Adipura Cup in 1993 for its cleanliness and environmental sustainability. In 1996, because of orderly traffic control, the city also won the Wahana Tata Nugraha Cup award. The industrial sector is the backbone of the city's economy, due to its central location in Simalungun Regency, and consists of medium to large industrial sites. Of the total economic activities in 2000, Pematangsiantar reached a GDP of Rp1.69 trillion, with the industrial market share making up 38.18% or Rp646 billion. The trade, hotel, and restaurant sectors followed in second place, with a contribution of 22.77% or Rp385 billion.

The motto of this city is Sapangambei Manoktok Hitei which comes from the Simalungun language which means working together to achieve a noble goal.

== History ==
Before 1907, Pematangsiantar was a Kingdom led by the Damanik. Damanik is one of the clans of the Simalungun ethnic group of the Batak people. The last independent king of the dynasty was Tuan Sangnawaluh Damanik. In 1907, the Dutch took control, turning Pematangsiantar into their colony. The city remained under Dutch control until 1942 when the Japanese invaded and ruled over Indonesia.

After Indonesia proclaimed its freedom in 1945, Pematangsiantar was granted autonomous status. In 1974, Pematangsiantar became a second-level district and was appointed as the capital of Simalungun Regency.

=== Siantar Kingdom ===
Before the Proclamation of Independence of the Republic of Indonesia, Pematangsiantar was a royal town. Pematangsiantar is domiciled in Pulau Holing, and the last independent king of this dynasty was a descendant of the Damanik clan, namely Tuan Sang Nawaluh Damanik who held power as king until 1907. Descendants of this king still hold ceremonial titles as 'Raja Siantar' which are recognized by the Simalungan people even today.

Around Pulau Holing then developed into a village where residents lived including the villages of Suhi Haluan, Siantar Bayu, Suhi Kahean, Pantoan, Suhi Bah Bosar, and Tomuan. These areas later became the legal areas of Pematangsiantar City, namely:

- Pulau Holing becomes Kampung Pematang
- Siantar Bayu becomes the Siantar city center
- Suhi Kahean became Kampung Sipinggol-pinggol, Kampung Melayu, Martoba, Sukadame, and Bane.
- Suhi Bah Bosar became a Kampung Kristen, Karo, Tomuan, Pantoan, Toba and Marimbang.

=== Dutch and Japanese Colonial Era ===
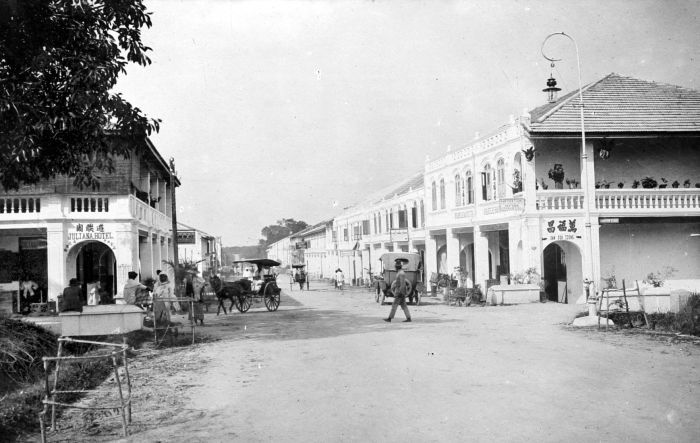
Street scene in Pematangsiantar in the 1910s

Church and home of the missionary at Kampung Kristen (lit.: Christian Village), established by Eduard Müller from the Rhenish Mission Society on 29 September 1907 in Pematangsiantar (ca.1910)

North Sumatra was one of the last areas in Indonesia annexed by the Netherlands. After the Dutch entered North Sumatra, the Simalungun area became the Dutch territory, and in 1907 the independent reign of the kings ended. The Dutch controller, who was originally based in Commerce, was transferred to Pematangsiantar in 1907. Since then Pematangsiantar has developed into an area visited by many newcomers,Chinese, and Indian communities inhabit the Timbang Galung and Kampung Melayu area, with ethnic Javanese centered in Tanah Jawa.

In 1910 the Pematangsiantar City Preparatory Agency was established. On July 1, 1917, based on Stad Blad No. 285, Pematangsiantar was designated as a Gemeente (dutch-style administrative division) with its autonomy. After January 1939 changes to the structure of the Gemeente Council were made under Stad Blad No. 717.

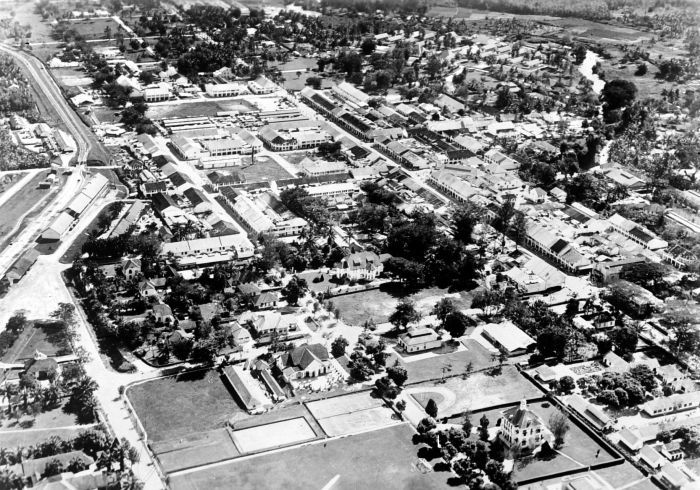
Aerial view of Siantar in 1938

The forces of Imperial Japan invaded and conquered the Dutch in Sumatra in 1942. In this Japanese era (1942-1945) the political structure was changed by the Japanese administration to Siantar State and the Council was abolished. Based on Law No. 22/1948, Gemente's status became the City of Simalungun Regency, and the Mayor of the city was concurrently the Regent of Simalungun. This arrangement continued after independence until 1957.

=== Independence and Contemporary Era ===
After the Proclamation of Indonesian independence, Pematangsiantar again became an Autonomous Region. Based on Law No.1/1957 it was designated a Full City Praja, and with the issuance of Law No.18/1965, the status was changed to that of a City. With the issuance of Law no. 5/1974 'Concerning the Principles of Regional Government' the status was changed to Pematangsiantar Level II Regional City. This is the current status of the city.

Based on Government Regulation No. 35 of 1981, Pematangsiantar Level II Regional City was divided into four administrative districts (kecamatan) consisting of 29 urban villages (kelurahan) with an area of 12.48 km^{2}, as inaugurated by the Governor of North Sumatra on 17 March 1982. Following expansion of the city to include districts previously part of Simalungun Regency, the number of districts in Pematangsiantar City is now eight districts consisting of a total of fifty-three urban villages (kelurahan).

== Geography ==
Because it is located near the equator, Pematangsiantar has a tropical climate with an average daily maximum temperature of 30.3 Celsius and an average minimum temperature of 21.1 Celsius. The average humidity is 84 percent.

=== Climate ===
Pematangsiantar has a tropical rainforest climate (Af) with heavy rainfall year-round. The temperatures are slightly moderated by the city's elevation.

Climate data for Pematangsiantar
Month	Jan	Feb	Mar	Apr	May	Jun	Jul	Aug	Sep	Oct	Nov	Dec	Year
Mean daily maximum °C (°F)	29.2 (84.6)	29.7 (85.5)	30.0 (86.0)	30.0 (86.0)	30.3 (86.5)	30.2 (86.4)	29.9 (85.8)	29.7 (85.5)	29.2 (84.6)	28.9 (84.0)	28.6 (83.5)	28.8 (83.8)	29.5 (85.2)
Daily mean °C (°F)	24.3 (75.7)	24.5 (76.1)	24.8 (76.6)	25.0 (77.0)	25.3 (77.5)	25.0 (77.0)	24.7 (76.5)	24.6 (76.3)	24.5 (76.1)	24.5 (76.1)	24.2 (75.6)	24.3 (75.7)	24.6 (76.4)
Mean daily minimum °C (°F)	19.4 (66.9)	19.4 (66.9)	19.7 (67.5)	20.1 (68.2)	20.3 (68.5)	19.9 (67.8)	19.6 (67.3)	19.6 (67.3)	19.9 (67.8)	20.1 (68.2)	19.9 (67.8)	19.8 (67.6)	19.8 (67.6)
Average rainfall mm (inches)	210 (8.3)	181 (7.1)	210 (8.3)	241 (9.5)	261 (10.3)	192 (7.6)	176 (6.9)	233 (9.2)	318 (12.5)	350 (13.8)	263 (10.4)	259 (10.2)	2,894 (114.1)
Source: Climate-Data.org

== Governance ==
The Mayor is the highest-ranking leader in the Pematangsiantar government. The Mayor of Pematangsiantar is responsible to the governor of the province of North Sumatra. The current mayor of Pematangsiantar City is the elected deputy mayor Susanti Dewayani. In the 2020 Pematangsiantar Mayoral Election, Susanti Dewayani was a candidate for deputy mayor, along with mayoral candidate Asner Silalahi, and together they won the election for the 2021-2024 term. However, Asner passed away before the official swearing-in ceremony.

Susanti was officially inaugurated as deputy mayor and the winner of the election by the governor of North Sumatra Edy Rahmayadi on February 22, 2022 at the North Sumatra governor's office, Medan City. Officially the position of mayor was still vacant at that point. Following that, the Pematangsiantar City Council held a meeting to elect a deputy mayor, and Susanti Dewayani was then appointed as Pematangsiantar mayor for the 2022-2024 period. Susanti Dewayani replaced Hefriansyah–Togar Sitorus who was in office from 2017-2022.

=== Administrative divisions ===
Map of Siantar's eight districts

The city is divided administratively into eight districts (kecamatan), tabulated below with their areas and their populations at the 2010 Census and 2020 Census, together with the official estimates as of mid 2025. The table includes the number of administrative urban villages (kelurahan) in each district, and their post codes.

Regional Code	Name of District (kecamatan)	Area in sq.km	Pop'n Census 2010	Pop'n Census 2020	Pop'n Estimate mid 2025	No. of kelurahan	Names of kelurahan (with their post codes)
12.72.05	Siantar Marihat	7.825	17,872	20,933	21,769	7	Sukaraja (21128), Baringin Pancur Nauli (21129), Pardamean (21128), Sukamaju (21127), Parhorasan Nauli (21129), Sukamakmur (21128), Mekar Nauli (21129)
12.72.08	Siantar Marimbun	18.006	14,642	20,675	23,537	6	Simarimbun (21129), Tong Marimbun (21129), Nagahuta (21129), Nagahuta Timur (21129), Pematang Marihat (21127), Marihat Jaya (21128)
12.72.04	Siantar Selatan (South Siantar)	2.020	17,101	17,447	16,972	6	Toba (21123), Karo (21122), Simalungun (21121), Martimbang (21125), Kristen (21124), Aek Nauli (21126)
12.72.02	Siantar Barat (West Siantar)	3.205	34,984	37,896	37,948	8	Dwikora (21118), Proklamasi (21117), Bantan (21111), Timbang Galung (21116), Simarito (21113), Sipingol Pingol (21114), Banjar (21112), Teladan (21115)
12.72.03	Siantar Utara (North Siantar)	3.650	46,423	49,886	49,761	7	Melayu (21144), Martoba (21143), Baru (21145), Sukadame (21146), Kahean (21147), Segulang Gulang (21141), Bane (21142)
12.72.01	Siantar Timur (East Siantar)	4.520	38,454	36,744	36,654	7	Kebun Sayur (21134), Tomuan (21133), Pahlawan (21132), Asuhan (21136), Merdeka (21135), Pardomuan (31131), Siopat Suhu (31139)
12.72.06	Siantar Martoba	18.022	38,368	50,350	55,322	7	Sumber Jaya (21137), Tambun Nabolon (21137), Naga Pita (21137), Pondok Sayur (21137), Tanjung Tongah (21137), Naga Pitu (21138), Tanjung Pinggir (21137)
12.72.07	Siantar Sitalasari	22.723	26,854	34,323	37,235	5	Gurilla (21137), Bah Kapul (21139), Setia Negara (21137), Bukit Shofa (21137), Bah Sorma (21139)
12.72	Totals	79.971	234,698	268,254	279,198	53	

== Demographics ==
In mid 2025 the population of Pematangsiantar City reached 279,198 people with a population density of 3,464 people per km^{2}; the male population of Pematangsiantar amounted to 138,049 and the female population to 141,149, thus the sex ratio of the population was 97.8.

No.	District	Males 2024	Females 2024	Total in mid 2025	Density (per km^{2})
1	Siantar Marihat	10,668	10,942	21,769	2,782
2	Siantar Marimbun	11,299	11,646	23,537	1,307
3	South Siantar	8,152	8,922	16,972	8,402
4	West Siantar	18,634	19,322	37,948	11,840
5	North Siantar	24,953	24,857	49,761	13,633
6	East Siantar	17,444	19,246	36,654	8,109
7	Siantar Martoba	27,314	27,004	55,322	3,070
8	Siantar Sitalasari	18,542	18,109	37,235	1,639
	Totals (2025)	138,049	141,149	279,198	3,491

Ethnicities of Pematangsiantar (2010 Census)
Ethnic group	Percentage
Batak	61.53%
Javanese	22.07%
Chinese	6.78%
Minangkabau	2.41%
Other	7.21%

=== Ethnics, Languages and Religion ===
The Batak people, especially the Toba and Simalungun, are the major ethnic group in Pematangsiantar, alongside sizeable Javanese and Chinese communities. Other ethnicities include Minangkabau, Indian, Acehnese, and others.

According to the 2010 Indonesian census, the majority of Pematangsiantar's inhabitants are Christian with 51.25 percent and Muslim with 43.9 percent. Around 4.36 percent are Buddhist, and there are smaller numbers of Hindu and followers of Confucianism. There are numerous houses of worship across the city, including one of the largest operating Buddhist temples in Indonesia.

The major languages in Pematangsiantar are Indonesian and Batak, both languages are lingua franca that are spoken among all ethnicities in the city. The Javanese community speak Javanese as a home language. Chinese Indonesians speak both Hokkien and Hainanese. Many Indians speak Tamil, and other ethnicities also have their own languages.

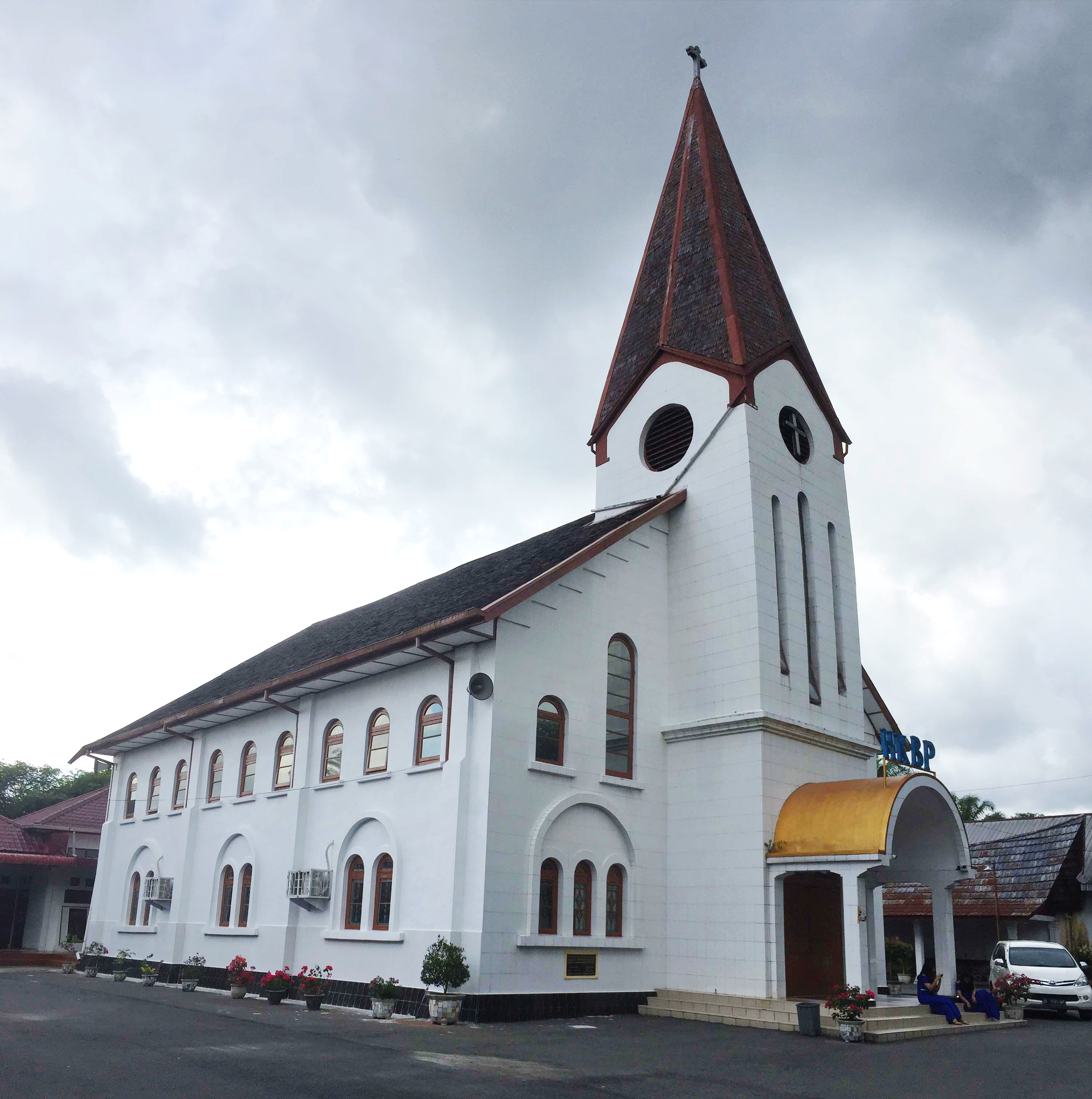
HKBP Pematangsiantar Resort Church, the largest Christian church in the city

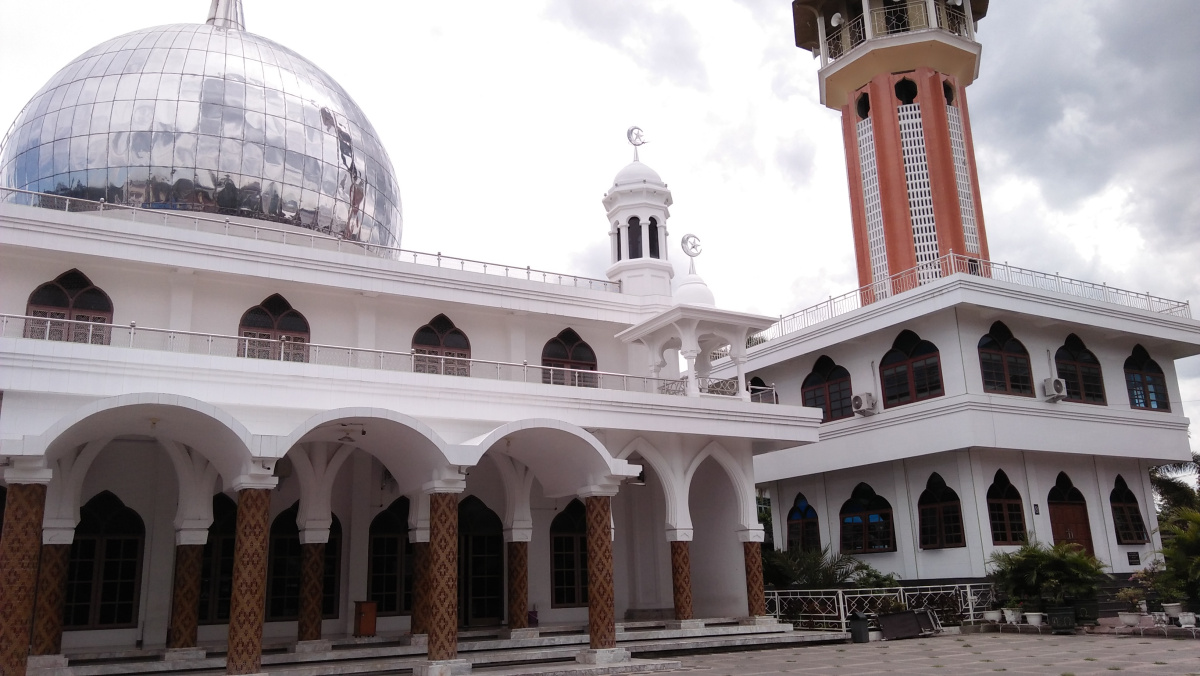
Pematangsiantar Grand Mosque, the main mosque in the city

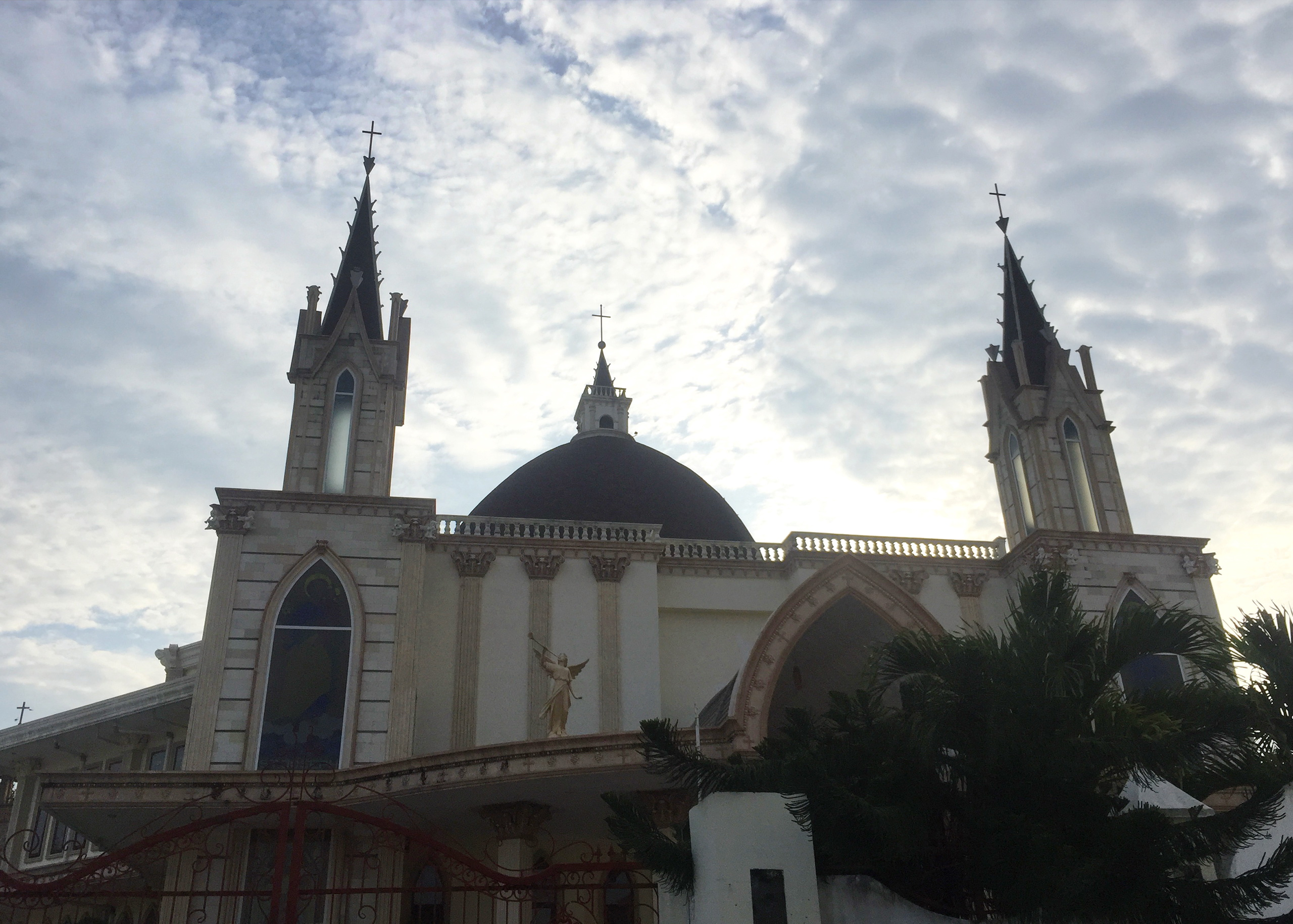
Saint Joseph's Cathedral, the primary Catholic Church in Pematangsiantar.

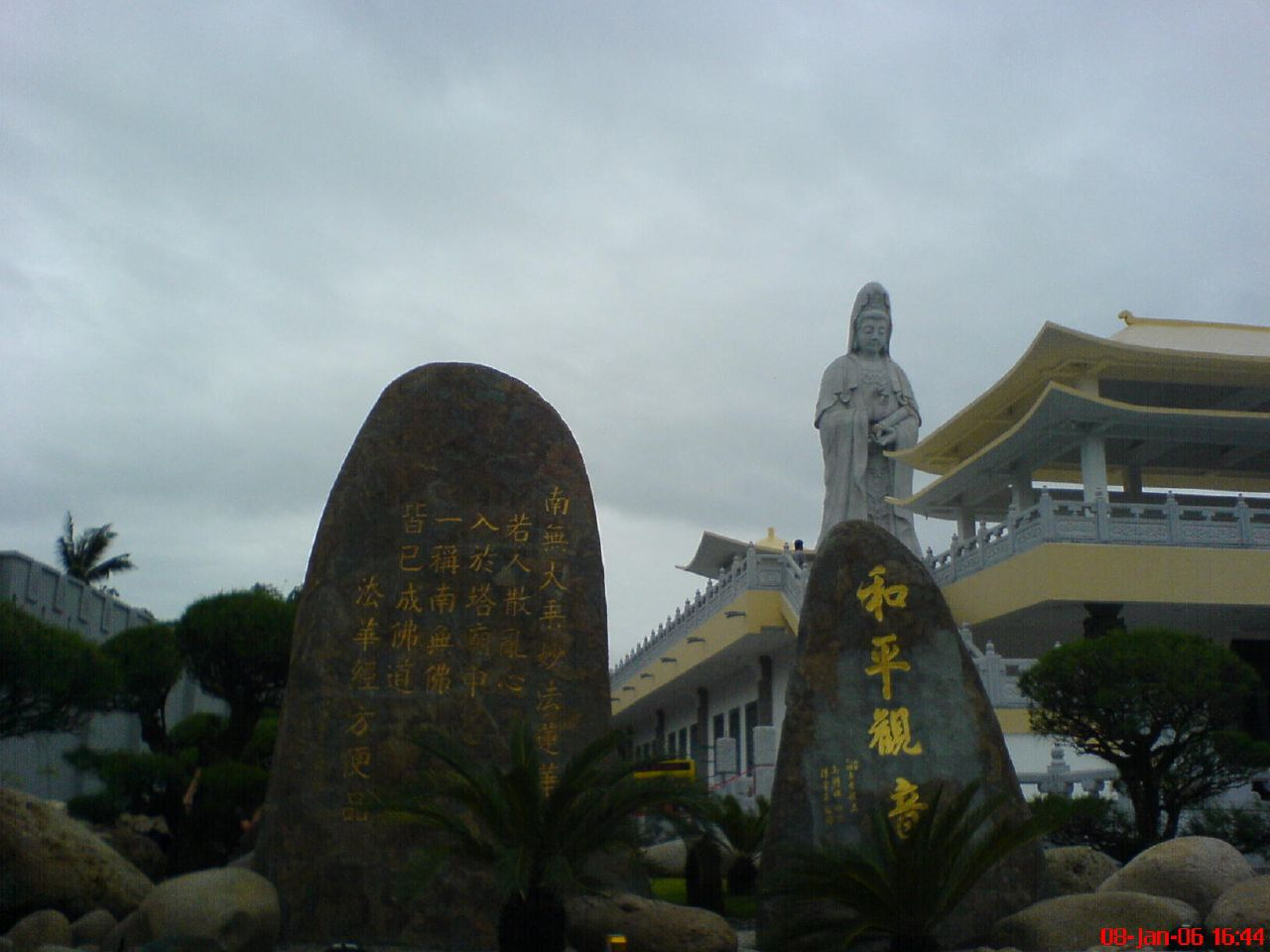
Vihara Avalokitesvara Buddhist temple, has the largest Guanyin statue in Indonesia

== Economy ==
Pematangsiantar's economy in 2020 when compared to the previous year declined by 1.89 percent. Based on the production approach, the highest growth was achieved by the Electricity and Gas Procurement business field of 2.24 percent. Followed by the Information and Communication business sector by 2.00 percent and the Agriculture, Forestry and Fisheries business field at 1.05 percent.

- Based on the expenditure approach, the Consumption Expenditure component of LNPRT achieved the highest growth of 0.36 percent.
- The business fields that dominate Pematangsiantar's GRDP in terms of production in 2020 are the Wholesale and Retail Trade; with Car and Motorcycle Repair at 25.28 percent, Manufacturing Industry at 21.51 percent and Construction at 10.15 percent. Meanwhile, from the expenditure side, the Household Consumption Expenditure (PKRT) component gave the largest contribution at 58.54 percent, following the PMTB component at 24.81 percent as the component with the second largest contribution.
- In nominal terms, Pematangsiantar's GRDP in 2020 at current prices reached Rp. 13,920.09 billion and GRDP at constant prices in 2010 reached Rp. 9,430.04 billion.

== Culture ==
=== Landmarks and Tourism ===
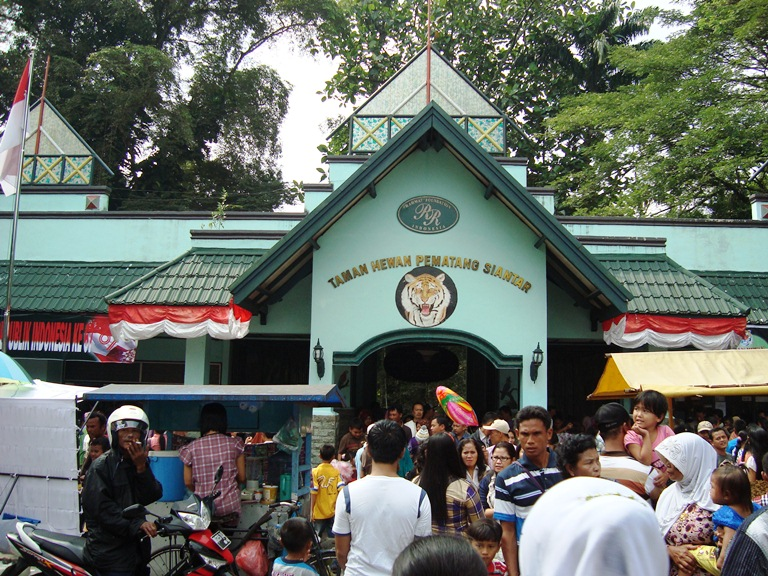
Siantar Zoo

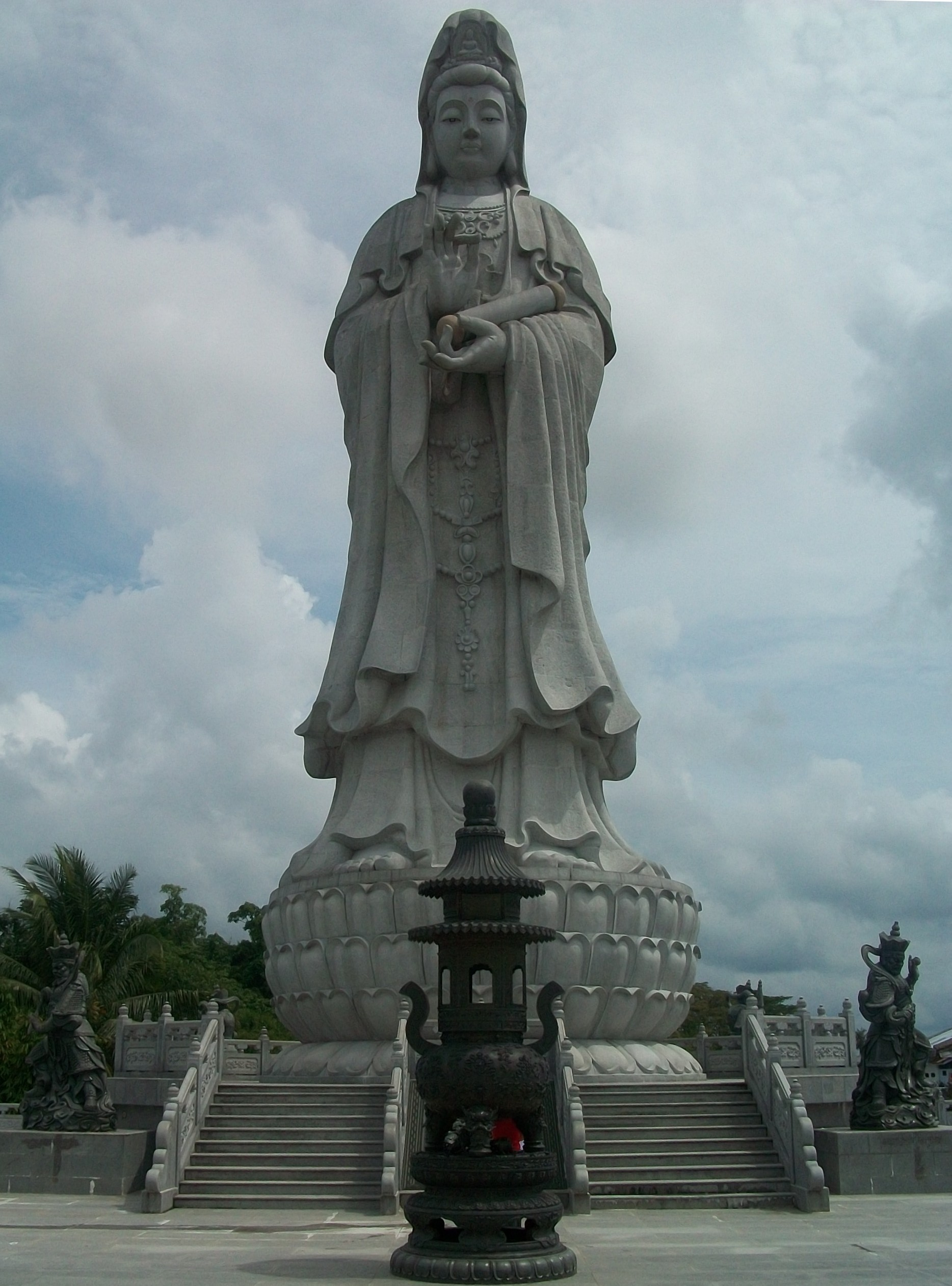
Guanyin statue in Avalokitesvara Buddhist temple in Bah Bolon, Pematangsiantar, it is the tallest Guanyin statue in Indonesia

Pematangsiantar is famous for its Batak culture, 'Batik' and 'Ulos' fabric, Batak foods, and well-appointed zoo called Taman Hewan Pematangsiantar - (Pematangsiantar Animal Park - Kebun Binatang Pemetangsiantar in Indonesian), with an extensive collection of Indonesian native animals, most notably birds, tigers and apes. The zoo itself boasts abundant tropical trees and plants, some of which are very old. The location is close to the centre of the city (within walking distance).

Another place of interest in the city is Vihara Avalokitesvara - a Buddhist Temple housing the Statue of Kwan Im. At 22.8 meter high, is the tallest statue of its kind in Indonesia. The temple complex is accessible from Jl. Pane, and is part of a new temple complex. Adjacent to the new complex and connected by a bridge across the Bah Bolon River, the old temple building was burned completely in a fierce blaze in May 2008.

Other landmarks and tourism spots are :

- Siantar Waterpark
- Siantar Becak statue
- Horas Market
- Simalungun Museum
- Zoologi Museum
- Siantar Botanic Park

=== Cuisine ===
Most of Pematangsiantar's food styles are inherited from Batak traditional food. Foods such as saksang (pork cooked in its own blood) and roasted pork, or drinks like tuak (an alcoholic beverage made from sugar palm and sometimes from coconut) prepared by the Batak people are very popular. Halal food is easy to find, with many nasi padang, satay, and bakso sellers scattered everywhere across Pematangsiantar.

Roti Ganda is the most famous souvenir food from Pematangsiantar, a plain pillow bread spread with Kaya or Serikaya. Other variants of Roti Ganda include pandan leaf jam, chocolate and cheese. Bakmi Siantar and Kok Tong Kopitiam coffee are another famous cuisine items among the Siantar Chinese community.

Another notable culinary destination is Toko A1 Asli, one of the city's oldest confectionery shops, famous for its traditional teng-teng candy. This crunchy sweet, made from sugar, peanuts, and sesame seeds, has become a popular souvenir from Pematangsiantar.

== Transportation ==
Pematangsiantar can be reached from Medan by train, with a daily Siantar Express service between Medan station to Siantar station. There are also large buses which connect Siantar to Medan, a 2 hour trip of 130 kilometres. The nearest airport is Kualanamu International Airport located around 70 km from the city. The toll road that connects Pematangsiantar to other cities such as Tebingtinggi, Kualanamu airport, and the provincial capital Medan has been finished in 2024.

Commute within the city is commonly done via angkots, a sort of minibus that usually travels from the outskirts of the city to the downtown core of Penatangsiantar (Horas Market).
