= 2024 Southwest Papua gubernatorial election =

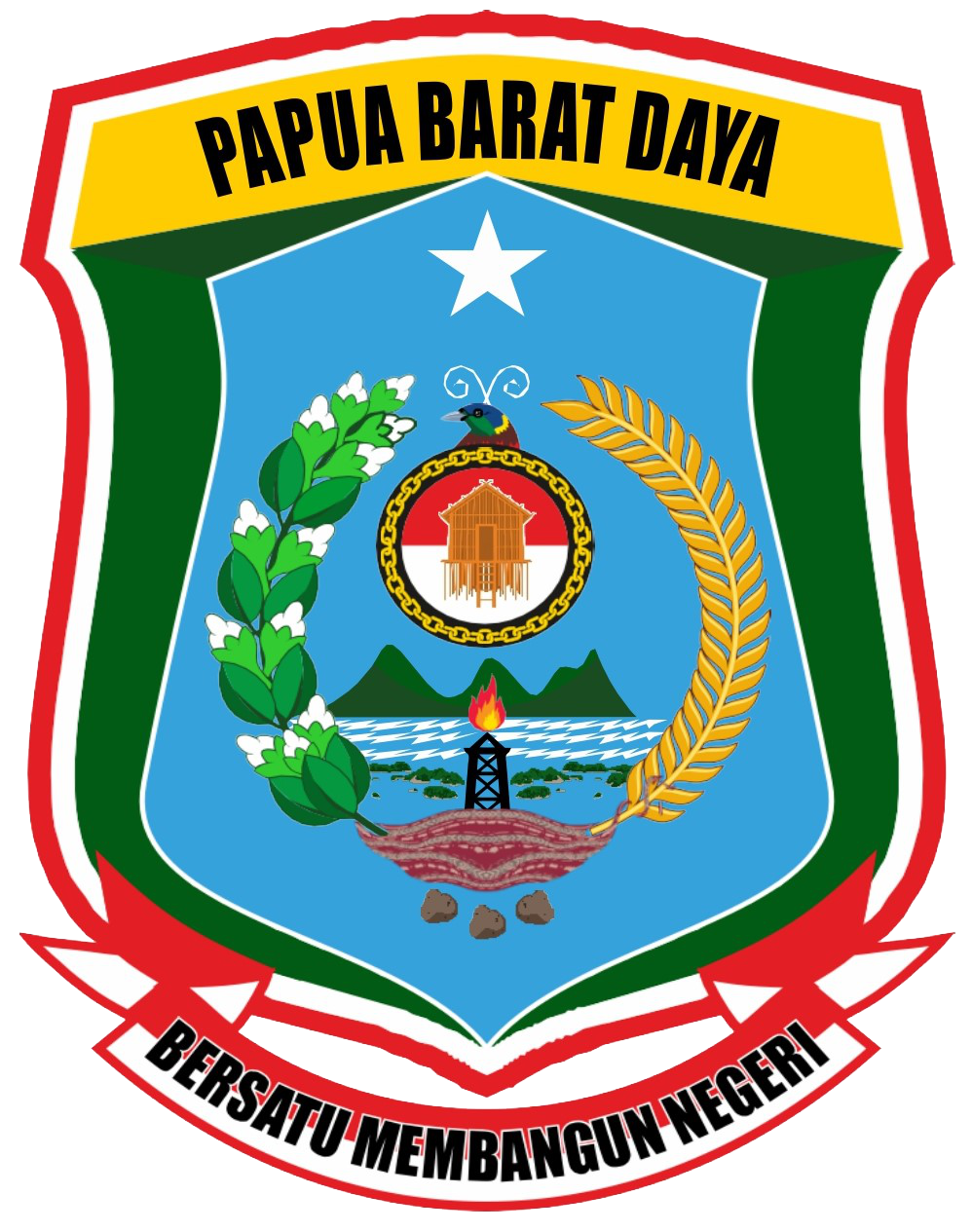
- 27 November 2024
- Turnout: 73.05%
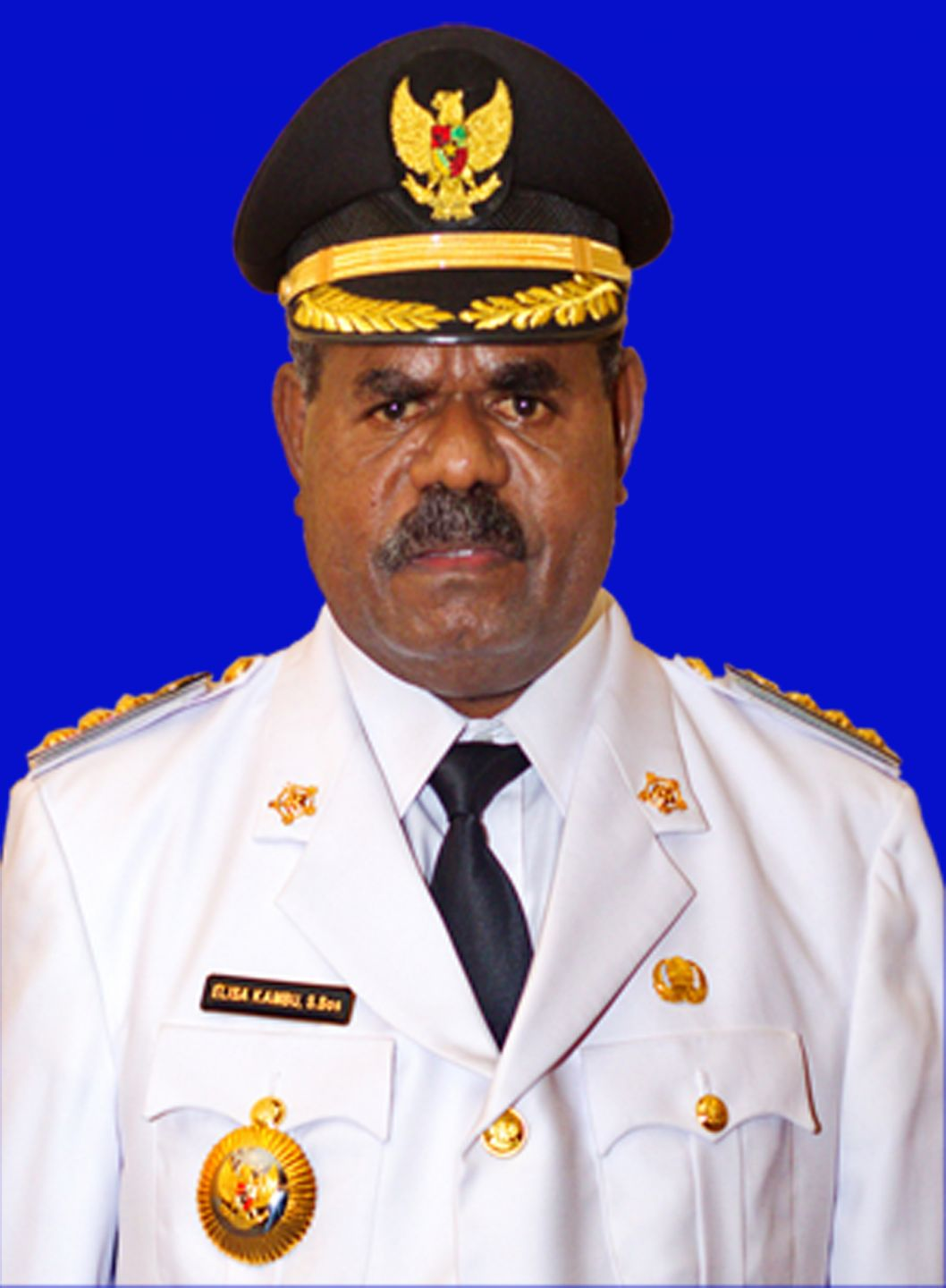

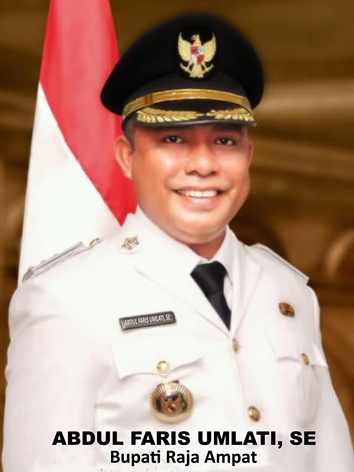

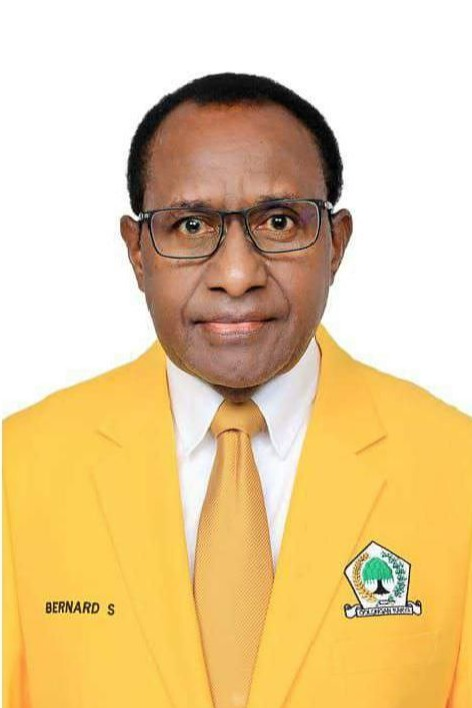

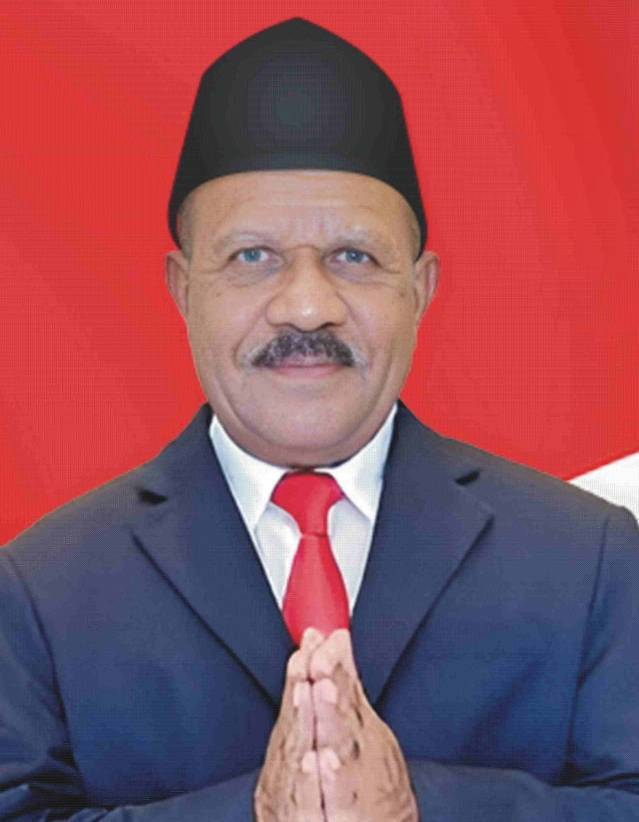

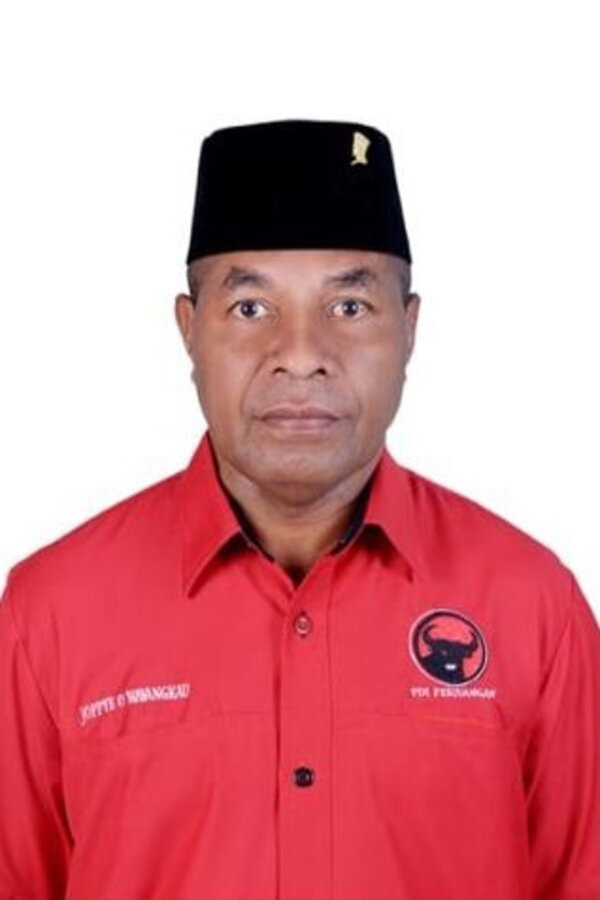
Candidate	Elisa Kambu	Abdul Faris Umlati	Bernard Sagrim
Party	Gerindra	Demokrat	Golkar
Alliance	KIM Plus	–	–
Running mate	Ahmad Nausrau	Petrus Kasihiw	Sirajuddin Bauw
Popular vote	144,598	79.635	36,757
Percentage	46.80%	25.78%	11.90%
Candidate	Gabriel Asem	Joppye Onesimus Wayangkau
Party	Hanura	PDI-P
Running mate	Lukman Wugaje	Ibrahim Wugaje
Popular vote	29,219	18,748
Percentage	9.46%	6.07%
Governor before election
Muhammad Musa'ad (acting)
Independent
Elected Governor
Elisa Kambu
Gerindra

The 2024 Southwest Papua gubernatorial election was held on 27 November 2024 as part of nationwide local elections to elect the governor of Southwest Papua for a five-year term. It was the first gubernatorial election for the province since its formation in 2022. Asmat Regent Elisa Kambu won the election with 46% of the vote, defeating four other candidates. Abdul Faris Umlati of the Democratic Party placed second, receiving 25%.

== Electoral system ==
The election, like other local elections in 2024, follow the first-past-the-post system where the candidate with the most votes wins the election, even if they do not win a majority. It is possible for a candidate to run uncontested, in which case the candidate is still required to win a majority of votes "against" an "empty box" option. Should the candidate fail to do so, the election will be repeated on a later date.

== Candidates ==
According to electoral regulations, in order to qualify for the election, candidates were required to secure support from a political party or a coalition of parties controlling 7 seats (20 percent of all seats) in the Southwest Papua House of Representatives (DPRPBD). With 8 out of 35 seats from the 2024 legislative election, Golkar is the only party eligible to nominate a gubernatorial candidate without forming coalitions with other parties. Candidates may alternatively demonstrate support to run as an independent in form of photocopies of identity cards, which in Southwest Papua's case corresponds to 40,083 copies. No independent candidates registered with the General Elections Commission (KPU) prior to the set deadline. Furthermore, due to Papuan special autonomy, both the gubernatorial and vice-gubernatorial candidates are required to be native Papuan – with at least one parent being an Indigenous Papuan.

=== Declared ===
The following are individuals who have been declared by a political party as endorsed candidates:

Candidate from PDIP
Joppye Onesimus Wayangkau	Ibrahim Wugaje
for Governor	for Vice Governor
Head of Indonesian Army Territorial Center (2020)	Papua Figure
Parties
5 / 35 (14%) PDIP (5 seats)

=== Potential ===
The following are individuals who have either been publicly mentioned as a potential candidate by a political party in the DPRPBD, publicly declared their candidacy with press coverage, or considered as a potential candidate by media outlets:

- Lamberthus Jitmau, former two-term mayor of Sorong.
- Abdul Faris Umlati (Demokrat), regent of Raja Ampat and chairman of Demokrat's Southwest Papua branch.
- Gabriel Asem (Perindo), former two-term regent of Tambrauw and chairman of Perindo's Southwest Papua branch.
- Elisa Kambu (PDI-P), two-term regent of Asmat, South Papua.
- Petrus Kasihiw (NasDem), regent of Teluk Bintuni, West Papua and chairman of Nasdem's Southwest Papua branch.

== Political map ==
Following the 2024 Indonesian legislative election, eleven political parties are represented in the DPRPBD:

Political parties	Seat count
Party of Functional Groups (Golkar)	8 / 35
Democratic Party (Demokrat)	5 / 35
Indonesian Democratic Party of Struggle (PDI-P)	5 / 35
NasDem Party	4 / 35
Great Indonesia Movement Party (Gerindra)	3 / 35
Perindo Party	3 / 35
People's Conscience Party (Hanura)	3 / 35
National Awakening Party (PKB)	1 / 35
National Mandate Party (PAN)	1 / 35
Prosperous Justice Party (PKS)	1 / 35
Indonesian Solidarity Party (PSI)	1 / 35

== Results ==
Candidate	Running mate	Party	Votes	%
Elisa Kambu	Ahmad Nausrau	Gerindra Party	144,598	46.80
Abdul Faris Umlati	Petrus Kasihiw	Democratic Party	79,635	25.78
Bernard Sagrim	Sirajuddin Bauw	Golkar	36,757	11.90
Gabriel Asem	Lukman Wugaje	People's Conscience Party	29,219	9.46
Joppye Onesimus Wayangkau	Ibrahim Wugaje	Indonesian Democratic Party of Struggle	18,748	6.07
Total			308,957	100.00
Valid votes			308,957	97.05
Invalid/blank votes			9,387	2.95
Total votes			318,344	100.00
Registered voters/turnout			435,812	73.05
Source: KPU
