= 2024 South Papua gubernatorial election =

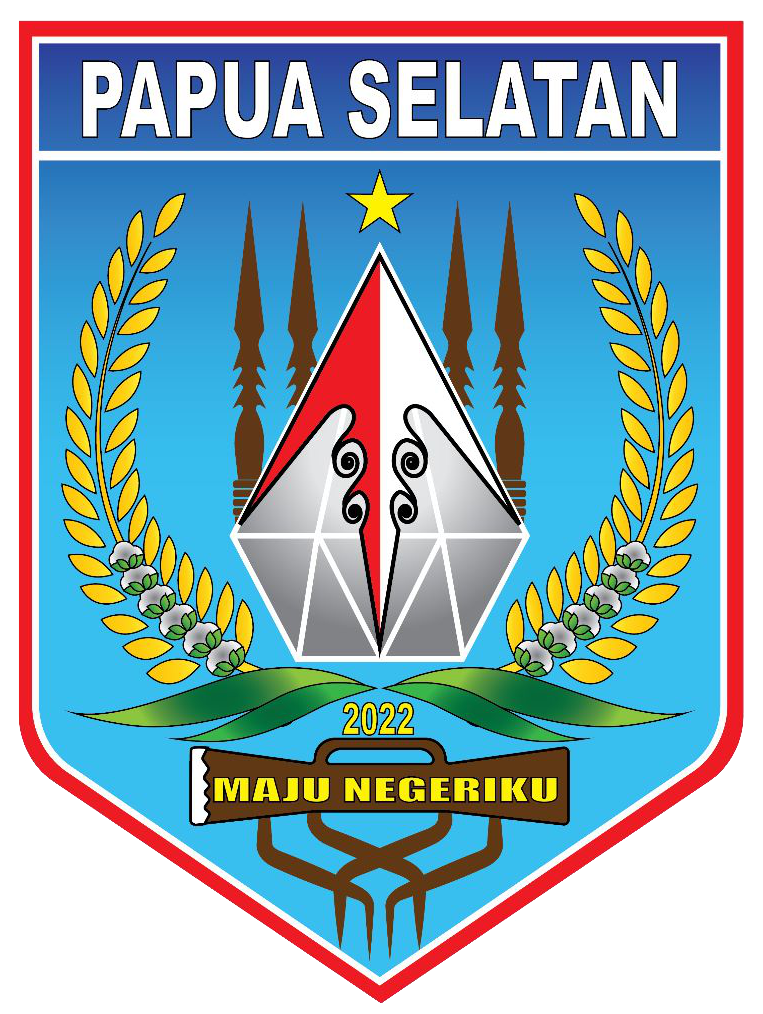
- 27 November 2024
- Turnout: 78.12%
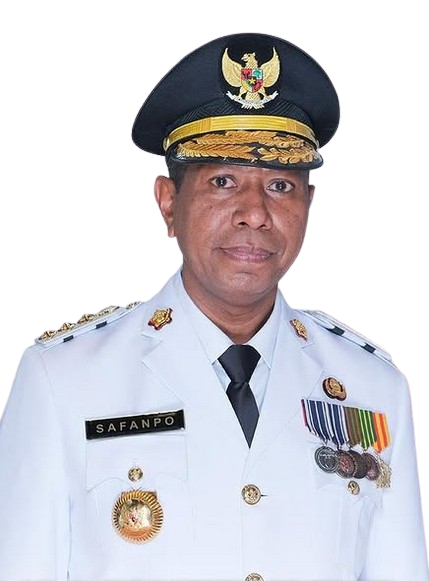

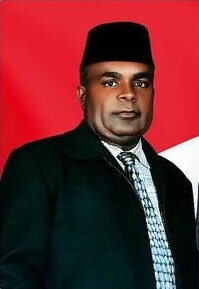

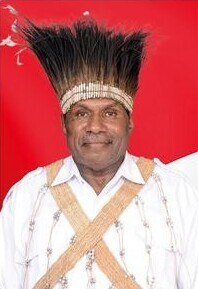
Candidate	Apolo Safanpo	Romanus Mbaraka	Darius Gewilom
Party	Independent	NasDem	Gerindra
Alliance	–	–	KIM Plus
Running mate	Paskalis Imadawa	Albertus Muyak	Yusak Yaluwo
Popular vote	139,580	68,991	49,000
Percentage	51.65%	25.53%	18.13%
Governor before election
Rudy Sufahriadi (acting)
Independent
Elected Governor
Apolo Safanpo
Independent

The 2024 South Papua gubernatorial election was held on 27 November 2024 as part of nationwide local elections to elect the governor of South Papua for a five-year term. It was the first gubernatorial election for the province since its formation in 2022. Apolo Safanpo won the election with 51% of the vote, defeating three other candidates. Former Merauke Regent Romanus Mbaraka of the NasDem Party placed second, receiving 25%.

== Electoral system ==
The election, like other local elections in 2024, follow the first-past-the-post system where the candidate with the most votes wins the election, even if they do not win a majority. It is possible for a candidate to run uncontested, in which case the candidate is still required to win a majority of votes "against" an "empty box" option. Should the candidate fail to do so, the election will be repeated on a later date.

== Candidates ==
According to electoral regulations, in order to qualify for the election, candidates were required to secure support from a political party or a coalition of parties controlling 7 seats in the South Papua House of Representatives (DPRP). The Indonesian Democratic Party of Struggle, which won 7 seats in the 2024 legislative election, is the only political party eligible to nominate a gubernatorial candidate without forming a coalition. Candidates may alternatively demonstrate support in form of photocopies of identity cards, however, no such candidates registered with the General Elections Commission in South Papua until the provided deadline. Furthermore, due to Papuan special autonomy, both the gubernatorial and vice-gubernatorial candidates are required to be native Papuan – with at least one parent being an Indigenous Papuan.

=== Potential ===
The following are individuals who have either been publicly mentioned as a potential candidate by a political party in the DPRP, publicly declared their candidacy with press coverage, or considered as a potential candidate by media outlets:

- Apolo Safanpo, former acting governor and academic.
- Nikolaus Kondomo, former acting governor of Highland Papua.
- Romanus Mbaraka (NasDem), former regent of Merauke and chairman of NasDem's South Papua branch.

== Political map ==
Following the 2024 Indonesian general election, eleven political parties are represented in the South Papua House of Representatives:

Political parties	Seat count
Indonesian Democratic Party of Struggle (PDI-P)	7 / 35
NasDem Party	6 / 35
Great Indonesia Movement Party (Gerindra)	5 / 35
Party of Functional Groups (Golkar)	4 / 35
Prosperous Justice Party (PKS)	3 / 35
National Awakening Party (PKB)	3 / 35
United Development Party (PPP)	2 / 35
Perindo Party	2 / 35
National Mandate Party (PAN)	1 / 35
Democratic Party (Demokrat)	1 / 35
Indonesian Solidarity Party (PSI)	1 / 35

== Results ==
Candidate	Running mate	Party	Votes	%
Apolo Safanpo	Paskalis Imadawa	Independent	139,580	51.65
Romanus Mbaraka	Albertus Muyak	NasDem Party	68,991	25.53
Darius Gewilom	Yusak Yaluwo	Gerindra Party	49,000	18.13
Nikolaus Kondomo	Baidin Kurita	Independent	12,656	4.68
Total			270,227	100.00
Valid votes			270,227	97.12
Invalid/blank votes			7,999	2.88
Total votes			278,226	100.00
Registered voters/turnout			356,147	78.12
Source: KPU
