= Apolo Safanpo =

Indonesian academic and bureaucrat

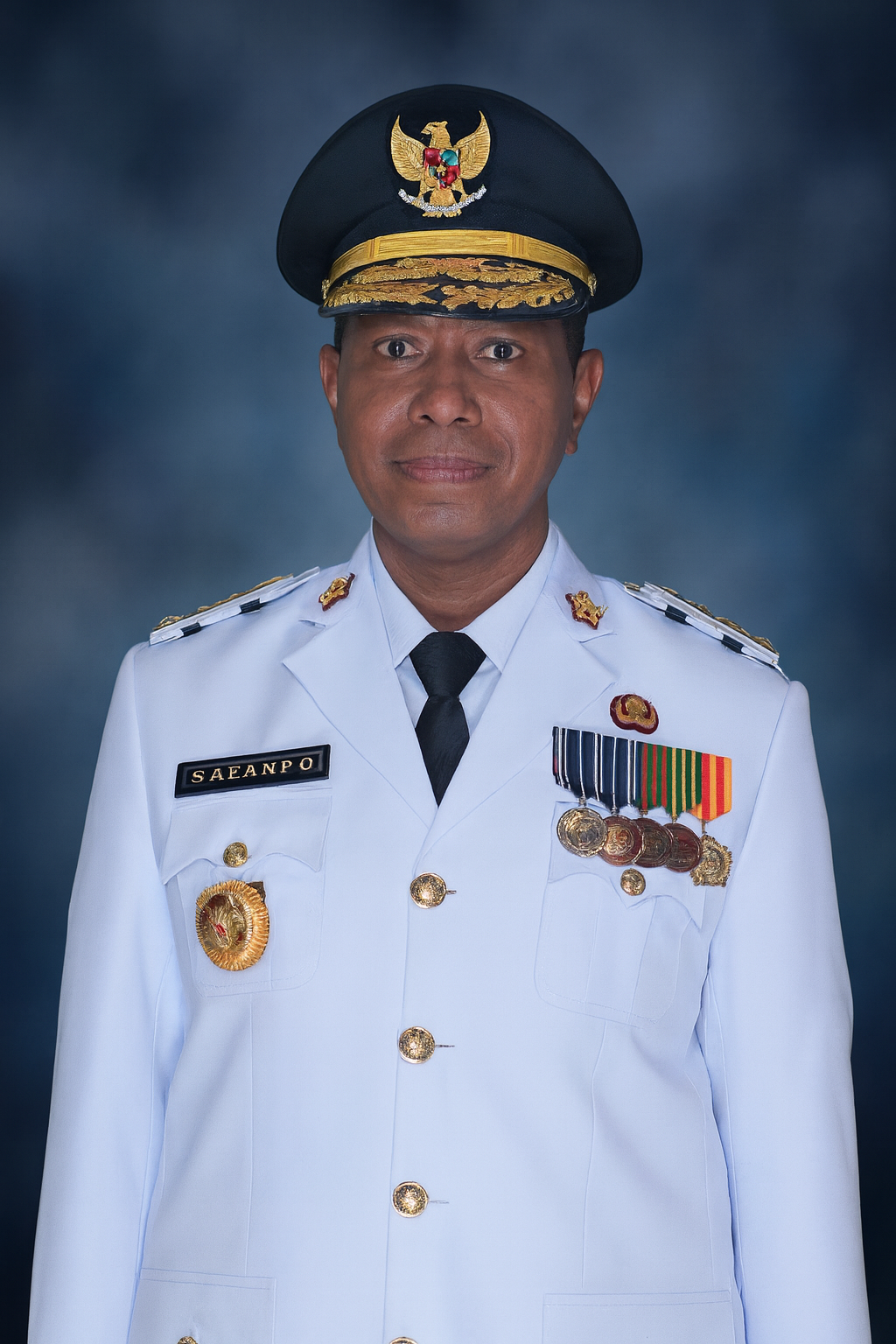

Governor of South Papua
- Incumbent
- Assumed office 20 February 2025
- Deputy: Paskalis Imadawa
- Preceded by: Rudy Sufahriadi (acting)
- In office 11 November 2022 – 5 August 2024
- Preceded by: office created
- Succeeded by: Rudy Sufahriadi (acting)

Rector of Cenderawasih University
- In office 14 September 2017 – 21 November 2022
- Minister: Mohamad Nasir; Nadiem Makarim
- Preceded by: Onesimus Sahuleka
- Succeeded by: Oscar Wambrauw

Personal details
- Born: 24 April 1975 (age 51) Agats, Irian Jaya, Indonesia
- Party: Golkar
- Spouse: Katharina Ade Irma Suryany Safanpo
- Children: 7
- Education: Sebelas Maret University (S.T.); Sepuluh Nopember Institute of Technology (M.T.); Diponegoro University (Dr.)

Apolo Safanpo (born 24 April 1975) is an Indonesian politician, academic and former bureaucrat who served as the governor of South Papua in an acting capacity from 11 November 2022 until his resignation on 5 August 2024. He also held office in the Ministry of Home Affairs as the minister's expert staff for governance since 9 November 2022. Before working in the bureaucracy, Apolo was an academic in the Cenderawasih University, with his highest office being the university's rector from 2017 until 2022.

Apolo resigned from his position to run for the definitive governor of South Papua in the 2024 Indonesian local elections, with Paskalis Imadawa as his running mate. He won the election with a majority of votes and is set to be installed as governor on 7 February 2025.

== Early life and education ==
Safanpo was born on 24 April 1975 in Agats, a town in the Merauke region of the province of Irian Jaya. Safanpo's mother died while he was seven years old. As his father was a soldier who had to be stationed outside Irian Jaya, Safanpo was brought up by his grandparents.

Safanpo began his education at a Catholic elementary school in Agats, which was organized by the Foundation for Education and Schooling of the Evangelical Churches. He continued his studies at the Saint Yohanes Permandi Junior High School in Agats and enrolled at the Tharuna Darma High School in Jayapura. Safanpo chaired the student council in the Tharuna Darma High School during his studies there.

Upon graduating from high school, Safanpo entered the Faculty of Engineering of the Sebelas Maret University in 1993 and studied civil engineering. Safanpo joined the Union of Catholic University Students of the Republic of Indonesia as well as the university's catholic association during his time in the university. He was also appointed as the assistant to four different lecturers while he was in the fourth semester. Safanpo eventually graduated from the university with a bachelor's degree in engineering (S.T.) in 1999.

Safanpo continued his studies during his career as a lecturer at the Cenderawasih University. Safanpo received a graduate degree in engineering from the Sepuluh Nopember Institute of Technology in 2002 and a doctorate in engineering from the Diponegoro University in 2016.

== Career ==
After graduating from the Sebelas Maret University, Safanpo joined the Faculty of Engineering of Cenderawasih University as a lecturer. He was named as the head of the civil engineering department in the faculty in 2003 and served in that position for several years before being named as the third vice dean of the faculty in 2005. After several years holding the post of vice dean, Safanpo was promoted as the dean of the faculty in 2012.

During his tenure as the dean of the engineering faculty, Safanpo was involved in the development of metallurgy studies in the university. At that time, metallurgy was a new major and was previously a subject under the geological department. Safanpo recruited several temporary lecturers from the Bandung Institute of Technology to teach metallurgy in the university.

Aside from his job in the Cenderawasih University, Safanpo also worked as expert advisor, staff, or member on various bureaucratic and political institutions such as the Bintang Mountains parliament, the Environmental Impact Management Agency of Papua, the People's Representative Council of Papua, the Papuan Environmental Agency, the General Elections Commission of Papua, and the Papuan People's Assembly. Safanpo was briefly involved in politics during the 2005 Asmat regent elections, where he was nominated as a candidate for the regent of Asmat by the Indonesian Democratic Party of Struggle and became one of the party's campaigner.

== Rector of Cenderawasih University ==
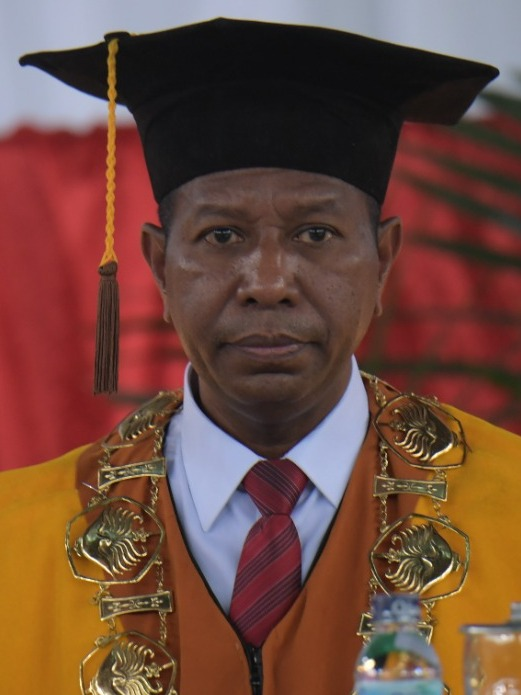
Apolo Safanpo as the Rector of the Cenderawasih University.

=== Background and election ===
Karel Sesa, the rector of the Cenderawasih University who was elected in 2013, died suddenly in 2015 due to medical complications. Upon his death, the Minister of Research and Higher Education Mohammad Nasir appointed Onesimus Sahuleka, the first vice rector of the university, as the acting rector for a two-year term. Despite his relatively long term as acting rector, Sahuleka failed to held an election for a definitive rector during his term, and his term was extended for six months. An election was finally held in September 2017.

The initial candidates consisted of five different academics from different faculties of the university. Further selection by the selection committee resulted in three main candidates for the post: Safanpo from the Faculty of Engineering and Business, Agustinus Fatem from the Faculty of Social and Political Sciences, and Marthinus Salossa from the Faculty of Law.

The final choice for the post of rector was made through an election, in which all 36 members of the university's senate were eligible to vote. The Minister of Research and Higher Studies, which was represented in the senate by a delegate, has a share of 19 votes. Safanpo won the final election with 38 votes, defeating Fatem with 13 votes and Salossa with 4 votes. Safanpo was inaugurated as the university's rector by Nasir on 14 September 2017.

After the end of his first term, Safanpo ran again for a second term. In the election, the share of the minister's vote was increased from 19 to 20. Safanpo won the second election with 52 votes — 91% of the votes — and setting aside two other candidates.

== Bureaucratic career ==
=== Acting Governor of South Papua ===
The Province of South Papua, along with two other provinces, was established through the approval of a bill on new autonomous regions on 25 July 2022. Nominations on the governors of the provinces began immediately as soon as the bill was approved. Chairman of the Cooperatives Council of Papua Paskalis Kossay and member of parliament Komaruddin Watubun nominated Safanpo for the post in early August 2022. Safanpo's candidacy grew stronger over time, mostly due to his involvement in the Papua bill and his Asmat origins. Safanpo's nomination as the Governor of South Papua was further strengthened after the Minister of Home Affairs installed him as the expert staff for governance on 9 November 2022. He was made as the acting governor of South Papua two days later.

Prior to his appointment as the acting governor, assistant to Papua's regional secretary Muhammad Musa'ad had circulated as the forerunner candidate for South Papua's regional secretary, the de facto deputy to the governor. Despite popular calls to appoint Musa'ad for the post, the government appointed Sugiarto, a bureaucrat from the home affairs ministry, for the post. The central government's choice for the post was criticized by various parties in Papua, who demanded that the government should appoint Musa'ad instead. Subsequent news regarding the replacement of the regional secretary was denied by Safanpo. Despite his denial, Safanpo later replaced Sugiarto with Madaremmeng, another bureaucrat from the home affairs ministry on 1 December.

== Personal life ==
Safanpo is married to Katharina Ade Irma Suryany Safanpo and has seven children. His older brother, Thomas Eppe Safanpo, was the incumbent deputy regent of Asmat since 2016.

== Award ==
- Civil Service Long Service Medals, 3rd class (2014)
