= Elsham =

Elsham may refer to:

- Elsham (organisation), an Indonesian human rights non-governmental organization
- Elsham, Lincolnshire, England, a village and civil parish
