= Festus Simbiak =

Indonesian academic

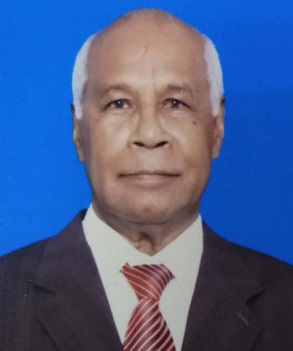

Rector of Cenderawasih University (acting)
- In office 19 October 2011 – 5 June 2013
- Preceded by: Balthasar Kambuaya
- Succeeded by: Karel Sesa

Personal details
- Born: February 1, 1952 (age 74) Biak, Netherlands New Guinea
- Party: Nasdem
- Education: HKBP Nommensen University (Drs.); Malang State University (M.Pd.)

Festus Simbiak (born 1 February 1952) was an Indonesian academic who served as the acting rector of Cenderawasih University from 2011 until 2013 and as the coordinator for private universities in Papua and West Papua from 2013 until 2017.

== Early life and education ==
Simbiak was born on 1 February 1952 in Biak, an island in the Dutch New Guinea territory. Simbiak attended the 413th state high school in Sorong from 1969 to 1971. Upon finishing his high school education in Sorong, Simbiak moved to North Sumatra, where he studied at the HKBP Nommensen University from 1972. He first received an associate degree in teaching. He taught at several schools in North Sumatra and Papua, such as the Sentosa School in Tebing Tinggi, Kalam Kudus School in Pematangsiantar, and the Christian Foundation's Teacher Education School in Biak. After several years of teaching, Simbiak decided to pursue a full degree in teaching and later obtained a bachelor's degree in teaching in 1982.

Simbiak joined the Cenderawasih University as a lecturer in 1983, where he taught guidance and counseling. In 1987, after several years of teaching, Simbiak was named as a merited lecturer of the university. He then decided to continue his education at the Malang Institute for Teaching and Education (later renamed to State University of Malang). He entered the institute in 1990 and received a master's degree in teaching in 1993.

Aside from his activity in the Cenderawasih University, Simbiak was also active in organizations. He was the chairman of the Papua's Council for Village Resilience from 1987 until 1992, deputy chairman of the Papuan chapter of the Indonesian Teachers' Association from 1995 to 2005, and the chairman of the Papuan chapter of the Union of Indonesian Christian Intellectuals from 2005 until 2012.

== Career ==
Simbiak was appointed as First Vice Rector in August 2009 following the election of Balthasar Kambuaya as rector for a second term. After Kambuaya was appointed as Minister of Environment and Forestry on 19 October 2011, Simbiak automatically replaced him as the acting rector of the university. Upon his inauguration as minister, Kambuaya met with the Director General of Higher Education to discuss the appointment of a definitive rector for the university. During his tenure as acting rector, Simbiak initiated the opening of twelve new postgraduate studies programme. The university also initiated cooperation with the University of Indonesia (UI), which was symbolized with the establishment of the Center for Papuan Studies.

Simbiak's term as acting rector ended with the installation as Karel Sesa as the definitive rector on 5 June 2013. Several months later, on 12 July 2013, Simbiak was installed as the coordinator for private universities in Papua and West Papua. During his tenure, Simbiak pushed for the change of his portofolio from the coordinator for private universities (Kopertis) to the Head of the University Service Agency. This nomenclature change would meant that the post would not only coordinate, but also public and state universities. Simbiak's term ended on 22 March 2017 and was replaced by Suriel Samuel Mofu.

During the 2019 Indonesian general election, Simbiak ran as a candidate for the People's Representative Council from the Papua constituency. He was supported by the NasDem Party. Simbiak obtained 13,839 votes in the constituency but he did not won a seat in the council.

== Awards ==
- Civil Service Long Service Medals, 1st Class (2017)
