= Onesimus Sahuleka =

Indonesian academic

Rector of the Cenderawasih University
- In office 3 March 2015 – 14 September 2017; Acting: 3 March 2015 – 13 April 2015
- Preceded by: Karel Sesa
- Succeeded by: Apolo Safanpo

Personal details
- Born: 1961 (age 64–65)
- Education: University of Indonesia (Drs.); Airlangga University (M.Hum); Padjadjaran University (Dr.)

Onesimus Sahuleka (born 1961) is an Indonesian academic who served as the Rector of Cenderawasih University from 2015 until 2017 and the first vice rector of the university from 2013 to 2024.

== Education and career ==
Sahuleka was born in 1961. He graduated from the Faculty of Law of the University of Indonesia in 1983. He then continued his studies at the Faculty of Law of the Airlangga University and obtained a master's degree in law in 1994, and at the Faculty of Law of the Padjadjaran University and obtained a doctorate in law in 2008.

Sahuleka joined the Cenderawasih University sometime upon his graduation from the University of Indonesia. He became a lecturer in the law faculty of the university, serving as the head of the civil law studies of the university from 1995 until 1997, first vice dean of the law faculty from 1997 until 2005, head of the university's societal service agency in 2005, and secretary of the postgraduate program of the law faculty. On 15 August 2013, Sahuleka was installed as the first vice rector of the university by rector Karel Sesa. Aside from his position in the Cenderawasih University, Sahuleka also taught at the Silas Papare College of Social and Political Sciences.

Upon Karel Sesa's death on 3 March 2015, Sahuleka became the acting rector of the university pursuant to the university's statute. He was installed as the definitive rector of the university on 13 April 2015. Sahuleka was replaced by Apolo Safanpo on 14 September 2017.

After serving as first vice rector for almost eleven years, on 5 April 2024 Sahuleka was replaced from his position by Dirk Y. P. Runtuboi.
