= Oscar Wambrauw =

Indonesian academic (1968–2026)

Rector of the Cenderawasih University
- In office 21 November 2022 – 17 September 2026
- Preceded by: Apolo Safanpo
- Succeeded by: Ferdinand Risamasu (acting)

Personal details
- Born: 8 October 1968 Biak, Papua, Indonesia
- Died: 17 September 2026 (aged 57) Jayapura, Papua, Indonesia
- Education: Cenderawasih University (S.E., Prof.); University of Göttingen (M.Sc.Agr.); Brawijaya University (Dr.)

Oscar Oswald Oktovianus Wambrauw (8 October 1968 – 17 September 2026) was an Indonesian academic and a professor of economics at Cenderawasih University. He was the university's rector from 2022 until his death in 2026. He previously held a number of leadership positions in the university, including as deputy rector for academic affairs and head of the university's higher education database.

== Life and academic career ==
Wambrauw was born in Biak on 8 October 1968. After graduating from high school, he continued his study at the Faculty of Economics at Cenderawasih University. He graduated from the university with a bachelor's degree in economics in 1994. From there, he went abroad and studied agriculture at the University of Göttingen and obtained a master's degree in agriculture in 1999. He received his doctorate from Brawijaya University in 2013.

He joined Cenderawasih University shortly after returning from the University of Göttingen, where he taught management sciences. He was appointed as the head of Cenderawasih University's computer center in 2002, and head of the management studies major in 2009. He received a promotion to the rank of senior lecturer shortly after receiving his doctorate. He was appointed in 2015 as the vice dean for finance and human resources of the faculty of economics and business, before his portofolio was shifted as vice dean for academic affairs in 2017. He was also concurrently responsible for the university's higher education database (PDPT, Pangkalan Data Pendidikan Tinggi). He was further promoted as the First Vice Rector of the Cenderawasih University on 1 December 2021.

== Rector of Cenderawasih University ==
On 22 November 2022, Wambrauw was appointed the rector of Cenderawasih University. The previous rector, Apolo Safanpo, had been appointed the acting governor of South Papua several months prior to the end of his term.

After Safanpo's remaining term ended, an internal voting by the university senate to elect a new rector was held on 7 September 2023. Wambrauw won the voting with a vote from the representative from the Ministry of Education, Culture, Research, and Higher Education (worth twenty regular votes) and a majority of 24 votes from 37 senate members. He was installed on 25 September for a four-year term.

Under his leadership, the university was granted Public Service Agency status in 2023, giving it wider autonomy in managing its assets and finances. He lobbied the construction of a government hospital, and in collaboration with Freeport established a science center. Wambrauw also oversaw the opening of several out-of-campus study centers in the islands of Papua, which the higher education ministry's representative in Papua Suriel Semuel Mofu credited for closing the gap between Papuans and higher education. With the government, Wambrauw directed university students to take part in the Patriot Expedition, a program by the transmigration ministry to map out potentials and support populaces within transmigration areas. On 30 January 2026, Wambrauw was appointed a full professor in strategy management and information system.

== Death ==
Wambrauw died at the Dok II Hospital in Jayapura on 17 September 2026, at the age of 57. Wambrauw had been diagnosed with kidney complications in 2025 and was treated both at home and abroad, before being brought to the Dok II Hospital for intensive treatment two days before his death. Papua’s higher education ministry representative, Suriel Semuel Mofu, stated that the leadership of the university would be exercised jointly by the three vice rectors before the higher education ministry appoints an acting rector, responsible for organizing the selection process for a full-term rector. Four days after his death, the minister of higher education Brian Yuliarto appointed Wambrauw's deputy for finance and administration, Ferdinand Risamasu, as acting rector.

Transmigration minister Muhammad Iftitah Sulaiman Suryanagara eulogized Wambrauw for his role in supporting the government's transmigration programs. A number of government officials, including the governor of South Papua Apolo Safanpo, Papua vice governor Aryoko Rumaropen, and Suriel Semuel Mofu paid their final respects as Wambrauw's body was laid in state at the Cenderawasih University Auditorium, before his body was interred at the Tanah Hitam Public Cemetery at Abepura, Jayapura. Wambrauw was married and had two children.
