= Soekisno Hadikoemoro =

Indonesian academic

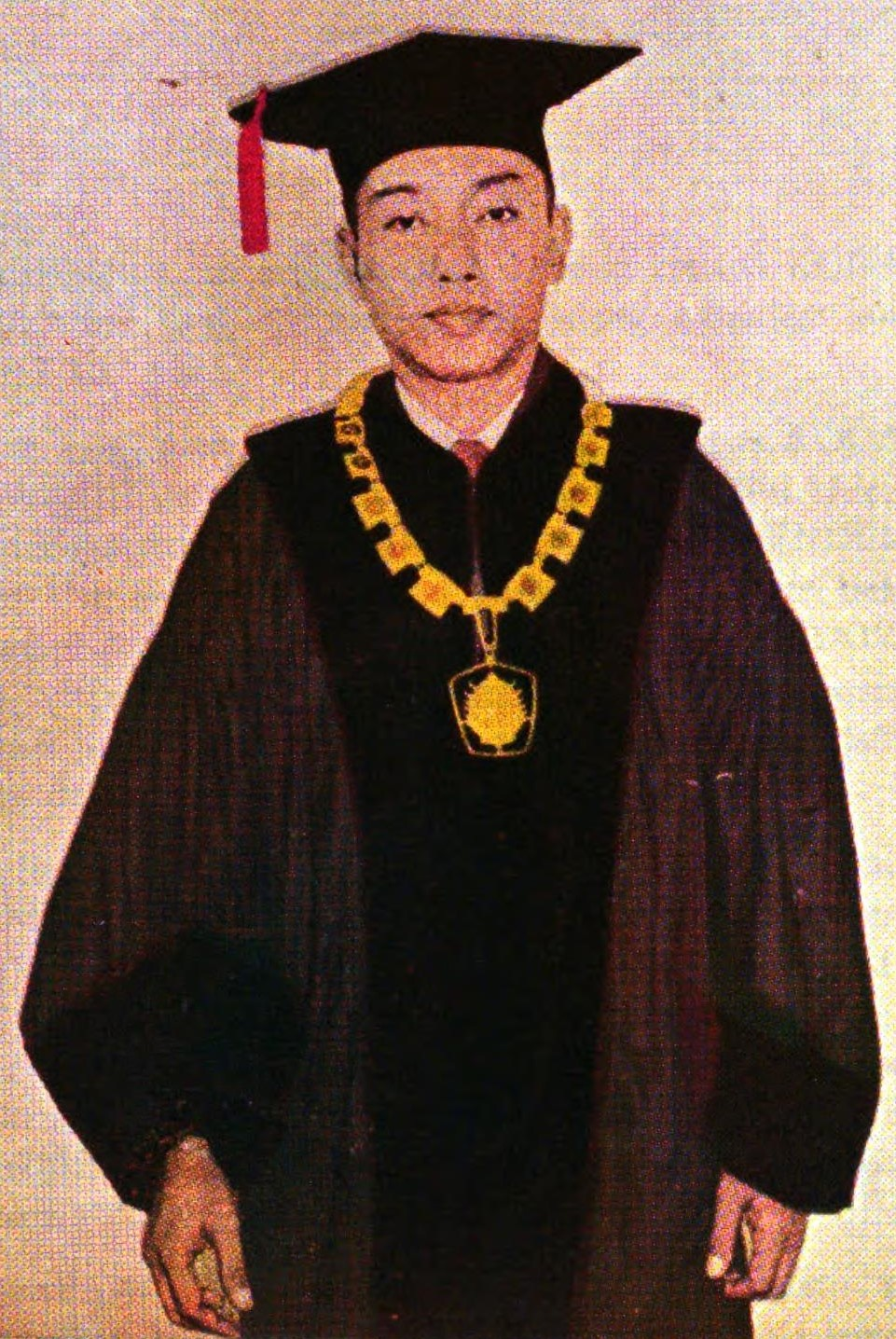

Director of Private Colleges
- In office 1974–1987
- Preceded by: office established
- Succeeded by: Yuhara Sukra

Rector of Cenderawasih University
- In office 21 August 1970 – 21 January 1975
- Preceded by: August Marpaung
- Succeeded by: Rubini Atmawidjaja

Personal details
- Born: April 22, 1932 Pekalongan, Central Java, Dutch East Indies
- Died: March 14, 2013 (aged 80) Bekasi, West Java, Indonesia
- Education: IPB University

Soekisno Hadikoemoro (22 April 1932 – 14 March 2013) was an Indonesian professor in agriculture who served as the 5th rector of the Cenderawasih University from 1970 until 1974.

== Early life ==
Soekisno Hadikoemoro was born on 22 April 1932 in Pekalongan. He went to study at the People's School (Sekolah Rakyat, equivalent to elementary school) and graduated in 1946. He continued his studies at the Pekalongan Junior High School and graduated in 1950. He was later accepted at the High School Section B (science).

== University studies ==
After his graduation from the high school, he enrolled at the Forestry Faculty of the IPB University. During his studies, he was entrusted the position of assistant at the physics laboratory in 1956. He finished his studies in 1958 and obtained a degree in agricultural studies. After that, he continued his studies in agricultural climatology at the Iowa State University from 1958 until 1959.

== Academic career ==
After his graduation from the IPB University, Hadikoemoro was immediately appointed as the Expert Assistant for Meteorology and Climatology in the IPB University. Two years later, in 1960, he was appointed as the Head of the Climatology Studies, and in 1961 was appointed as the Chairman of the Natural Science Department of the IPB University.

On 5 September 1962, the Minister of Higher Education and Science enacted a decree which formally appoints Hadikoemoro as the Dean of the Faculty of Agriculture in the Andalas University. After a year, on 1 May 1963, Hadikoemoro was transferred as the Dean of the Faculty of Mathematics and Natural Science, and was later promoted to the office of the Assistant Rector III of the Andalas University on 31 December 1963.

Three years later, Hadikoemoro received a decree dated 28 November 1965 about his appointment as the Dean of the Faculty of Agriculture in the Cenderawasih University since 1 February 1966. Less than a year later, on 16 June 1966, he was appointed as the Assistant Rector I of the Cenderawasih University.

After four years as an assistant rector, on 21 August 1970, Hadikoemoro was officially appointed by President Suharto as the Rector of the Cenderawasih University, replacing Colonel August Marpaung. He later held concurrent office as the acting Head of the Irian Jaya Regional Office of the Ministry of Education and Culture in 1 March 1971. During this period, the university began regularly publishing the Irian scientific bulletin, which was the result of collaboration between the university and the Summer Institute of Linguistics (SIL). He held the office as the Rector of the Cenderawasih University until 21 January 1975, when he was replaced by Rubini Atmawidjaja.

After ten years in Irian Jaya, Hadikoemoro was assigned an office with a nationwide authority. He was appointed by the Minister of Education and Culture as the Director of Private Colleges and served in the position from 1974 until 1987. He later joined the Trisakti University and became a professor as well as the chairman of the university's board of trustees. He died in Bekasi on the midnight of 14 March 2013.

== Legacy ==
The main library of the Pekalongan University is named after him.

== Works ==
- Hadikoemoro, Soekisno (1971). "Strategi Pendidikan di Irian Barat: Topics [sic] Untuk Pertimbangan" [Education Strategy in West Irian: Topics for Advice] (PDF). Irian: Bulletin on West Irian Development (in Indonesian). I (2): 27–30.
- Hadikoemoro, Soekisno (1977). Pembinaan Lima Tahun Pertama (Bilita I) Perguruan Tinggi Swasta, 1979-1983 [The First Five Years of Private Higher Education Development, 1979-1983] (in Indonesian). Jakarta: Directorate General of Private Colleges — Ministry of Education and Culture.
- Hadikoemoro, Soekisno; Soekma, A. Kosasih (1980). Rencana Induk Pengembangan Perguruan Tinggi Swasta: Pokok-pokok Penyusunan dan Evaluasi [Private Higher Education Development Master Plan: Principles of Preparation and Evaluation] (in Indonesian). Jakarta: Directorate General of Higher Education — Ministry of Education and Culture.
- Hadikoemoro, Soekisno (1999). Tragedi Trisakti, 12 Mei 1998 [The Trisakti Tragedy, 12 May 1998] (in Indonesian). Jakarta: Universitas Trisakti. ISBN 979-8398-21-1.
- Hadikoemoro, Soekisno (1998). Renungan [Muse] (in Indonesian). Jakarta: Universitas Trisakti. ISBN 979-8398-33-5.
- Hadikoemoro, Soekisno (2001). A Comparison of Public and Private University Students' Expectations and Perceptions of Service Quality in Jakarta, Indonesia (Thesis). UMI Dissertation Services.

== Bibliography ==
- Soegito, Ari Tri; Ds., Slamet (1983). Biografi Nasional di Daerah Jawa Tengah (PDF) (in Indonesian). Department of Education and Culture, Directorate of History and Traditional Values, National Historical Documentation and Inventory Project.
- Walker, Malcolm T. (1972). "Notes on Contributors" (PDF). Irian: Bulletin on West Irian Development (in English and Indonesian). I (2). Archived from the original (PDF) on June 23, 2011.
