= Nikolaus Kondomo =

Indonesian politician

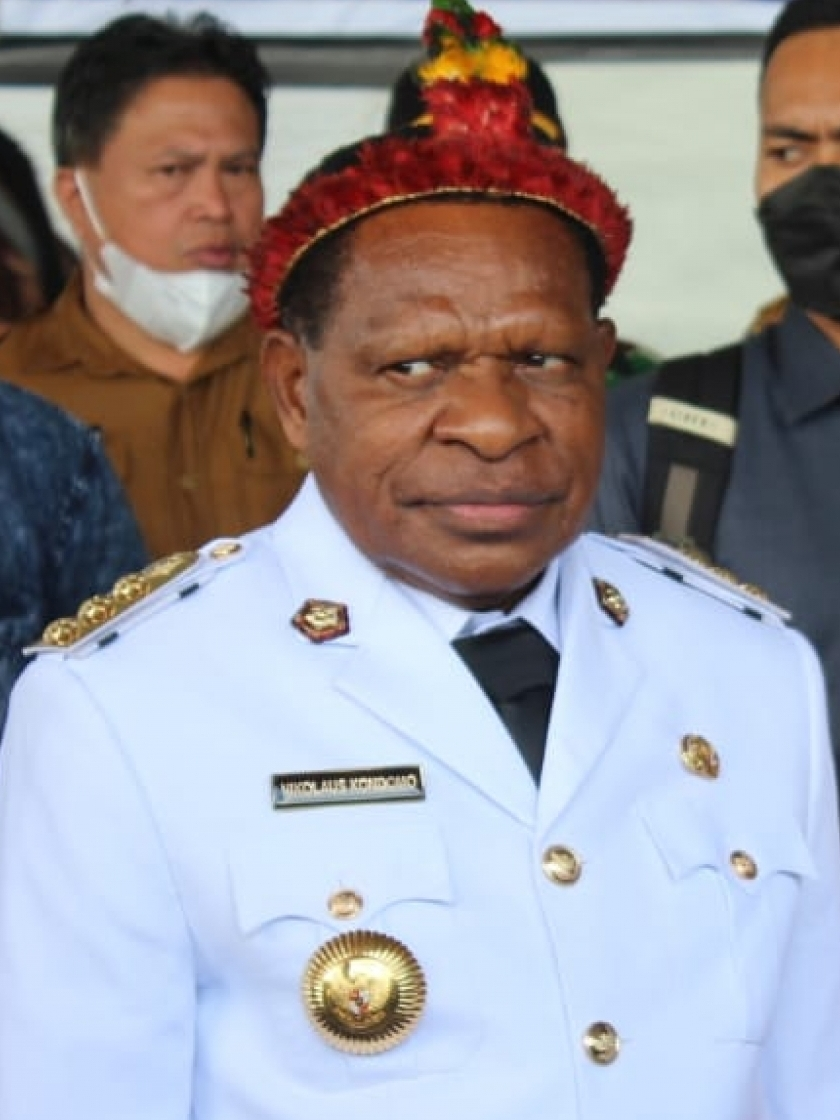

Governor of Highland Papua
- Acting
- In office 11 November 2022 – 13 November 2023
- Preceded by: office created
- Succeeded by: Velix Wanggai

Attorney General of Papua
- In office 18 November 2019 – 10 November 2022
- Preceded by: Heffinur
- Succeeded by: Jehezkiel Devy Sudarso (acting); Witono

District Attorney of Sleman
- In office 20 March 2014 – 6 January 2016
- Preceded by: Jacob Hendrik Pattipeilohy
- Succeeded by: Dyah Retnowati Astuti

District Attorney of Fakfak
- In office 2007–2012
- Preceded by: Gede Gunawan Wibisana
- Succeeded by: unknown

Personal details
- Born: 13 March 1964 (age 62) Merauke, Irian Jaya, Indonesia
- Education: 17 August 1945 University (S.H.); Cenderawasih University (M.H.)

Nikolaus Kondomo (born 13 March 1964) is an Indonesian attorney and bureaucrat who is serving as the governor of Highland Papua province in an acting capacity since 11 November 2022 until 13 November 2023. He also held office in the attorney general's office of Indonesia as the attorney general's expert staff for inter-institutional relations and international cooperation since 10 November 2022. Prior to that, he was the attorney general of Papua from 2019 to 2022. He was the first ethnic Papuan (Muyu) to be appointed as the attorney general of a province.

== Early life and education ==
Kondomo was born on 13 March 1964 in Merauke. Upon graduating from high school, Kondomo studied criminal law at the 17 August 1945 University in Sleman. He then continued his studies at the Cenderawasih University and received a postgraduate degree in law from the university.

== Career ==
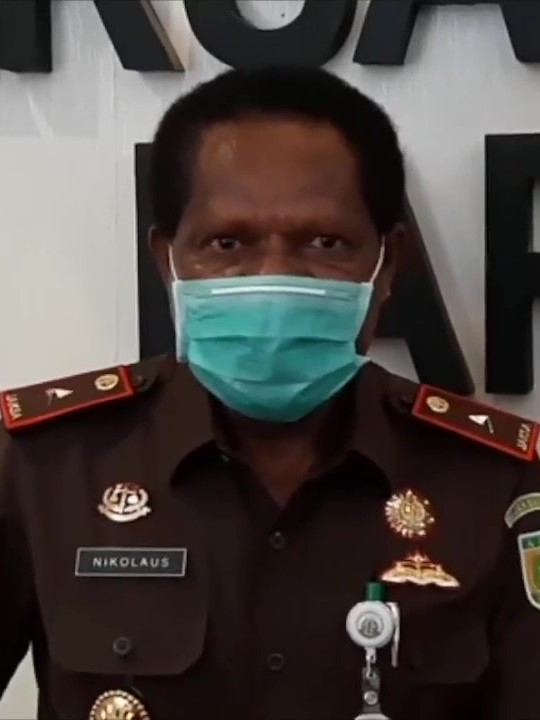
Nikolaus Kondomo as Papua Province's attorney general in 2020

Kondomo joined the public prosecution service shortly after he received his law degree. His first major appointment was as the district attorney of Fakfak in 2007. He held this office until 2012 and was transferred to the office of the Papua's attorney general as the assistant for special crimes. During this period, Kondomo took part in prosecuting the chairman of the West Papuan Regional People's Representative Council Yoseph Yohan Auri and provincial company director Mamad Suhadi, who was arrested after being found in a corruption case involving around 20 billion rupiahs of provincial funds.

After two years serving in the office of the Papua's attorney general, Kondomo was moved to Central Java. He was installed as the district attorney of Sleman on 20 March 2014, replacing Jacob Hendrik Pattipeilohy. Kondomo was replaced as the district attorney of Sleman on 6 January 2016 by Dyah Retnowati Astuti. From Sleman, Kondomo was transferred to East Java and became the assistant for supervision to the province's attorney general. Several months into his new position, Kondomo investigated Harwiadi, an associate attorney in the Surabaya's district attorney office, for allegations of bribery by a robbery perpetrator. Kondomo's attempt at the investigation infuriated district attorney of Surabaya, Didik Farhan, who then claimed that Harwiadi "had sworn to god" that he did not accept any bribes of any sort.

Several months after his tenure in East Java, Kondomo was posted as a coordinator for the junior attorney general for state administration. After serving as coordinator, Kondomo became the deputy attorney general of Central Sulawesi in 2018. He was then transferred to Papua, where he became the deputy attorney general of the province for several months in 2019 before becoming the attorney general of Papua on 18 November 2019. Kondomo was the first ever indigenous Papuan to held office as the province's attorney general. His appointment by the attorney general was in line with the military and police, who around the same time also appointed indigenous Papuans to become military commander and police chief of the province.

The bill on the new autonomous regions in Papua on 25 July 2022, which resulted in the establishment of the Highlands Papua province and two other provinces, opened up new governor offices. Kondomo became a strong candidate in the selection process, with his provincial secretary—second-in-line—being the incumbent head of the Development Planning Agency of Papua Yohannes Wailio. His candidacy was further confirmed following his dismissal as attorney general and his appointment as the expert staff to the attorney general of Indonesia for inter-institutional relations and international cooperation on 10 November 2022. Kondomo was installed as the acting governor of Highlands Papua a day after his appointment as expert staff.

== Organization ==
Kondomo was active in the Papuan chapter of the Full Gospel Business Men's Fellowship International, where he became the director of the organization's social service.
