= John Rumbiak =

Indonesian activist (born 1962)

John Rumbiak (born 1962) is a West Papuan human rights and environment activist. Born in Biak, he began English studies at Cenderawasih University (Abepura) in 1982 and worked as a coordinator and field researcher at the Rural Community Development Foundation (YPMD) in Abepura.

Joining the Institute for Human Rights Study and Advocacy now known as Elsham, the leading West Papuan human rights Non-governmental organization based in Jayapura he served as supervisor. His good English and excellent presentation skills then facilitated his role as Elsham's chairman of International Affairs travelling widely attending many international conferences informing the international community about West Papua. In February 2005, he suffered a stroke in New York, he is also fearful of returning to West Papua after a series of death threats in 2003.
