= Karel Sesa =

Indonesian academic

Rector of the Cenderawasih University
- In office 5 June 2013 – 3 March 2015
- Preceded by: Festus Simbiak
- Succeeded by: Onesimus Sahuleka

Personal details
- Born: April 5, 1954 Teminabuan, Netherlands New Guinea
- Died: March 3, 2015 (aged 60) Dian Harapan Hospital, Waena, Papua
- Education: Brawijaya University (Drs.); University of Indonesia (M.Si); Hasanuddin University (Dr.)

Karel Sesa (5 April 1954 – 3 March 2015) was an Indonesian academic who served as the Rector of Cenderawasih University from 2013 until his death in 2015.

== Education and career ==
Sesa was born on 5 April 1954 in Teminabuan, a small town in Dutch New Guinea. After graduating from high school, he continued his study at the University of Brawijaya in Malang and graduated in 1984 with a doctorandus. He then pursued further studies at the University of Indonesia in 1990 and graduated from the university in 1993 with a master's degree in trade administration. Several years later, Sesa attended the Hasanuddin University in Makassar and obtained a doctorate from the university in 2004.

Sesa joined the Cenderawasih University shortly after his graduation from the University of Indonesia, where he taught environmental and regional economics. Around 2013, he became the Head of the Postgraduate Management programme in the university.

== Rector of the Cenderawasih University ==
Sesa nominated himself as a candidate for the rector of the Cenderawasih University. Following a set of selection process, which was held since January 2013, Sesa became one of the final three candidates to run for the final election, alongside Agustinus Fatem from the Faculty of Social and Political Sciences and Hendrik Krisifu from the Faculty of Law. A debate was held two days before the election on 10 April. Sesa won the final election with 24 votes, defeating Fatem who obtained 14 votes and Krisifu with 10 votes. Sesa was installed as the rector of the Cenderawasih University on 5 June 2013.

During Sesa's tenure as rector, the medicine faculty of the university experienced mismanagement and resulted in the faculty's accreditation status being suspended by the ministry of education. The problem was further complicated with the absence of the faculty's dean. Students from the faculty went to the streets and demanded explanation from the rector regarding the problems. The protest coordinator, Benyamin Lagowan, stated that the rector "ran away from the problems" and has proven himself "unworthy of leading the campus".

On 3 March 2015, Sesa was admitted to the Dian Harapan hospital due to breathing complications. After being treated for about two and a half hours, Sesa died in the hospital at around 3 p.m. local time. Upon his death, his body was bathed and was laid at the rector's official residence before being transferred to the university's auditorium. He was buried at the Tanah Hitam Public Cemetery two days after his death.

== Awards ==
- Star of Service, unknown class (Indonesian: Bintang Jasa) (13 October 2014)
