= Muhammad Musa'ad =

Indonesian politician (born 1965)

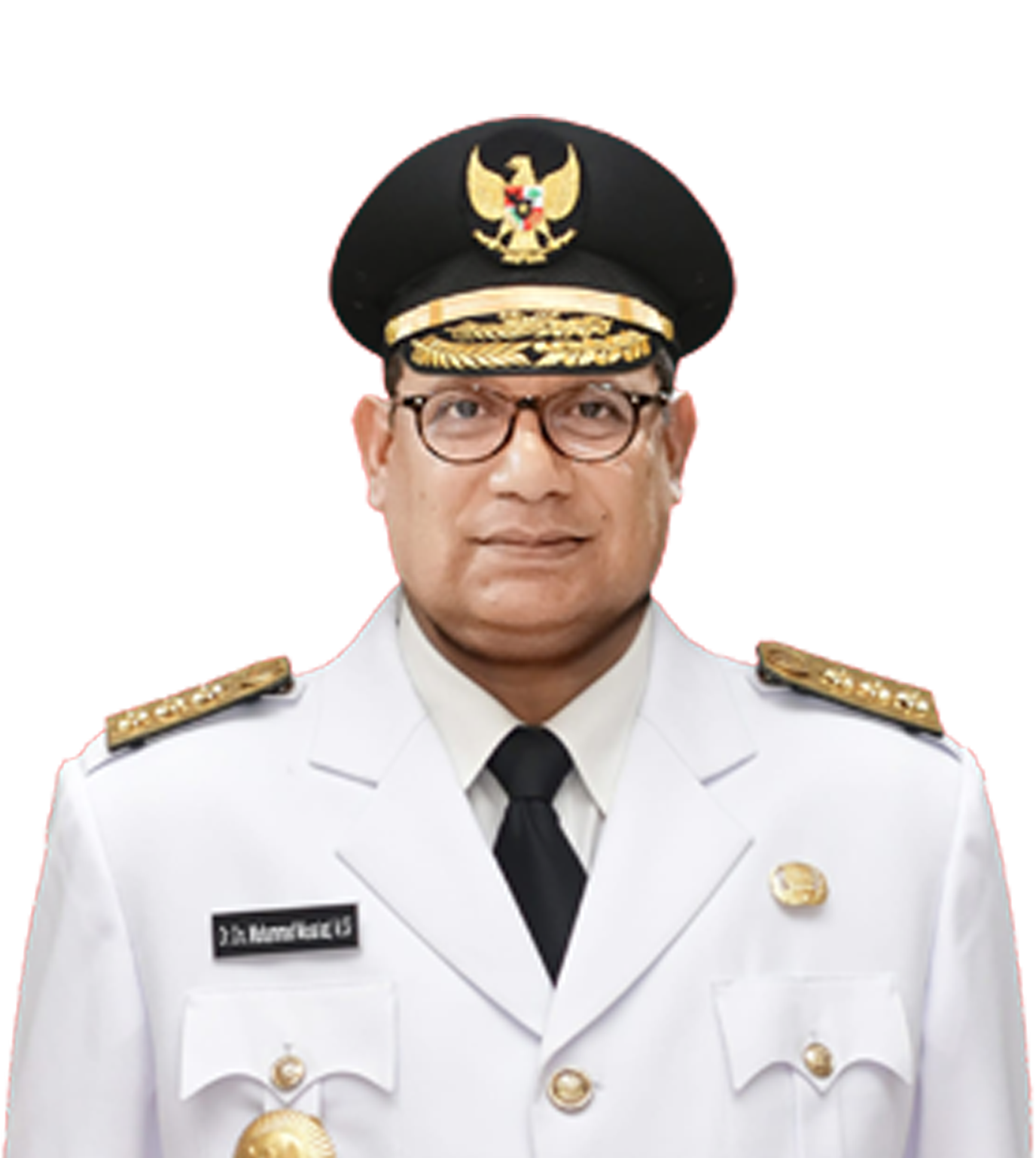
- Musa'ad in 2023

Acting Governor of Southwest Papua
- Incumbent
- Assumed office 9 December 2022
- Preceded by: Office created

Personal details
- Born: 22 July 1965 (age 60) Fakfak, Irian Jaya, Indonesia
- Education: Hasanuddin University (Drs, M.Si.); Padjadjaran University (Dr.)

Muhammad Abud Musa'ad (born 22 July 1965) is an Indonesian academic and bureaucrat who is serving as the Acting Governor of Southwest Papua since 9 December 2022. He also held office in the Ministry of Investment as the minister's expert staff for competitiveness improvement. Musa'ad was previously head of Papua's Regional Development Planning Agency from 2014 until 2019 and Second Assistant to the Papuan Regional Secretary from 2020 until 2022. He was also a lecturer in the Cenderawasih University, with his last position in the university being the head of the university's democratic center.

== Early life and education ==
Musa'ad was born on 22 July 1965 in Fakfak, Irian Jaya (now West Papua). His father, Abud Musa'ad, was of Arab descent and owned a construction agency in Geser, Seram Island, while his mother originated from Fakfak. Musa'ad's Arab ancestor had arrived in Fakfak from at least the 1800s (and later intermarried as well as assimilated into the Papuan native Muslim population, Arabs were invited from Maluku Islands to become religious teachers and formed part of the aristocracy but some also migrated as traders) and contributed to the development of the region.

Musa'ad spent most of his childhood in Fakfak. He finished his primary education at the YAPIS (Islamic Education Foundation) primary school in 1979, his junior high school education at the 1st Fakfak State Junior High School in 1982, and high school education at the 416th State High School in 1985.

Upon finishing his high school education, Musa'ad moved to Makassar to pursue higher education at the Hasanuddin University. He studied governance sciences in the university and graduated in 1990. After several years teaching in the Cenderawasih University, Musa'ad returned to Hasanuddin University and pursued further studies in development administration. He obtained a master's degree in science from the university in 1998. He continued further studies in governance sciences at the Padjajaran University, where he obtained a doctorate in governance sciences in 2009.

== Academic career ==
Musa'ad returned to Irian Jaya four years later and joined Cenderawasih University as a lecturer in the Faculty of Social and Political Sciences. He also taught at the Silas Papare Institute of Social and Political Sciences. He became the first vice dean of the Faculty of Social and Political Sciences from 2002 until 2003. Musa'ad became the head of the university's democracy center two years later and held the position until 2011. During this period, Musa'ad wrote several books about regional autonomy in Papua.

== Political and bureaucratic career ==
=== 2005 gubernatorial election ===
Musa'ad was appointed as a member of the Papuan branch of the General Elections Commission. He resigned from the commission in 2005 to run as a vice governor candidate alongside Lukas Enembe. The pair was submitted as one of the five candidates for the gubernatorial election in 2006 by the local parliament to the Papuan People's Assembly, a legislative body which consisted of the coalition of Papuan tribal chiefs and was tasked with arbitration and speaking on behalf of Papuan tribal customs. Initially, the assembly's chairman assured Musa'ad that the assembly's electoral verification committee had recommended that all candidates be declared eligible for the election. However, two days after his name was submitted, the assembly announced that Musa'ad was ineligible to run for election due to his ancestry.

The Papuan People's Assembly required all candidates to be ethnically Papuan as a prerequisite to run for the elections. Although Musa'ad mother is ethnically Papuan, his father is of Arab descent, therefore making him technically Orang Asli Papua (OAP) or indigenous Papuan according to special autonomy law but not according to a majority of Papuan People's Assembly members. Most of the members of the assembly argued that only those with "black skin and frizzy hair" could be considered ethnically Papuan. Despite the argument of one of the tribal chiefs in the assembly that Musa'ad is an ethnic Papuan due to another clause which is the acceptance by the local customary community, he was rejected by other members. When the matter was put into a vote, 27 out of 42 members of the assembly voted to reject Musa'ad candidacy.

Musa'ad's rejection by the assembly sparked protests from his supporters, who alleged that the incumbent governor, J.P. Solossa, had influenced the assembly's decision in order to prevent Musa'ad from attracting Papuan Muslim voters in the election. Chaos ensued in the following days, with his supporters attacking the General Elections Commission as well threatening to burn down the assembly's office. Officials from the central government warned the assembly that it might overstep from its authority as a cultural advisory body.

Upon his rejection by the assembly, the parliament asked the pair to search for an alternative vice governor candidate. Musa'ad spent about a week visiting mosques and meeting with Muslim local figures in Papua in order to find a suitable replacement for himself. Musa'ad later found Arobi Ahmad Aituarauw, a Muslim banker and former senate candidate, who agreed to replace him after no other replacement was found. Protests soon ceased after Enembe declared Aituarauw as his running mate.

=== Bureaucratic career ===
In 2011, Musa'ad, who was working in the Cenderawasih University, was appointed by Minister of Sports and Youth Andi Mallarangeng as acting assistant deputy for youth pioneering in the ministry. Andi Mallarangeng was arrested two years later and was replaced by Roy Suryo. Suryo later dismissed one of the assistant deputy in the ministry and appointed Musa'ad to held the post temporarily.

Musa'ad's former running mate, Lukas Enembe, became the Governor of Papua in April 2013 after winning the gubernatorial election. Upon his victory, Musa'ad was appointed as the acting head of the province's development planning agency on 27 May 2013. His appointment was made definitive on 6 March 2014.

On 20 August 2019, Musa'ad became the acting Second Assistant to the Papuan Regional Secretary. He became the definitive officeholder on 23 January 2020. Musa'ad also later served as the acting regent of Waropen from 28 September until 4 December 2020. Following the formation of the South Papua province in 2022, Musa'ad name was nominated as a candidate for the South Papua's regional secretary, the de facto deputy to the governor of South Papua. The government did not appoint Musa'ad and instead appointed a bureaucrat from the home affairs ministry.

After the formation of three new provinces in the former Papua region on 9 November 2022, the government continued the trend by establishing the Southwest Papua province. The West Papuan People's Assembly submitted seven candidates for the acting governor of Southwest Papua to the ministry of home affairs. However, the central government refused to pick a name from the candidate list and instead appoint Musa'ad as the acting governor. Upon his confirmation as governor, he was transferred to the Ministry of Investment and became the minister's expert staff for competitiveness improvement. He was appointed as acting governor of Southwest Papua on 9 December 2022. The central government's choice for the post was criticized by Mananwir Paul Fincen Mayor, a leader from Doberay customary region, who questioned his indigenous Papuan status.

== Works ==
- Musa'ad, Muhammad Abud. Model Reformasi Birokrasi dalam Perspektif UU No. 21 tahun 2001 (PDF). Depok: University of Indonesia. Archived from the original (PDF) on 8 May 2010.
