= Cenderawasih University =

Public university in Jayapura, Papua, Indonesia

Coordinates: 2.6085°S 140.6760°E

- Universitas Cenderawasih
- Other name: Uncen
- Type: Public
- Established: 10 November 1962
- Rector: Vacant
- Faculty: 60
- Students: 2,240
- Location: Jayapura, Papua, Indonesia
- Campus: Urban: Abepura (old campus) Rural: Waena (new campus)
- Colors: Yellow
- Website: www.uncen.ac.id

Cenderawasih University (Indonesian: Universitas Cenderawasih) is a university in Jayapura, Papua province, Indonesia. The university is the leading educational institution in the province.

The university has faculties in economics, law, teacher training and education, medical, engineering, and social and political science. Until 2002 the university had a faculty of agricultural sciences at Manokwari, which was then separated to form the Universitas Negeri Papua. The university is divided into two areas: mainly the "Kampus lama" (old campus) which is in the Jayapura suburb of Abepura and the "Kampus baru" (new campus) which is in the hillside of Waena valley.

In 2021 it appointed the first woman, Marlina Flassy, to a deanship in its history. Flassy, an anthropologist, was appointed as Dean of the Faculty of Social and Political Sciences, and is also the first indigenous Papuan to hold the position.

== Kampus Lama (old campus) Abepura ==
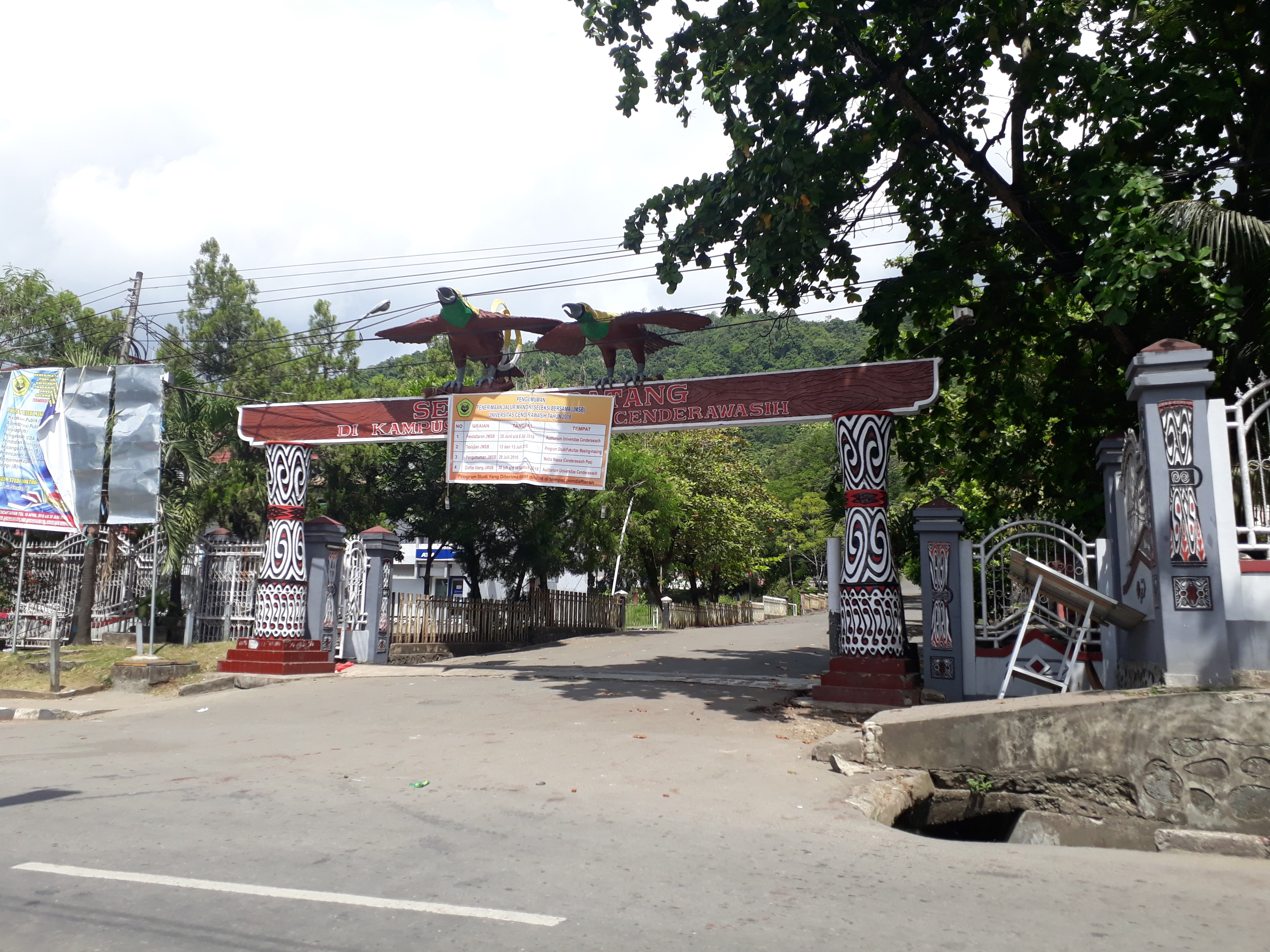
Entrance to the old campus

- Faculty of Teacher Training and Education
- Faculty of Medicine
- Faculty of Public Health
- Faculty of Law (Library & Extension)
- Faculty of Social and Political Science (Extension)
- Faculty of Nursing

== Kampus Baru (new campus) Waena ==
- Faculty of Economics
- Faculty of Social and Political Sciences (Main Building)
- Faculty of Law (Main Faculty)
- Faculty of Mathematics and Natural Sciences
- Faculty of Engineering

== Alumni ==
Among the well-known alumni of the university is John Rumbiak, who founded the human rights organisation the Institute of Human Rights Studies and Advocacy (ELS-HAM) in Jayapura. The governor of Papua Province, Barnabas Suebu, and the Indonesian footballer, Boaz Solossa started his higher education at the university.

== Rectors ==
This is a list of academicians who served as rectors in the Cenderawasih University:

- Soegarda Poerbakawatja (1962–1967)
- R. Bintoro (1967–1968)
- Adi Andojo Soetjipto (1968–1969)
- August Marpaung (1969–1970)
- Soekisno Hadikoemoro (1970–1975)
- Rubini Atmawidjaja (1975–1978)
- Rudy Tarumingkeng (1979–1983)
- August Kafiar (1988–1996)
- Frans A. Wospakrik (1996–2005)
- Balthasar Kambuaya (2005–2011)
- Festus Simbiak (2011–2013)
- Karel Sesa (2013–2015)
- Onesimus Sahuleka (2015–2017)
- Apolo Safanpo (2017–2022)
- Oscar Wambrauw (2022–2026)
