= Indonesian Army Territorial Center =

Army Territorial Center
- Pusat Teritorial Angkatan Darat
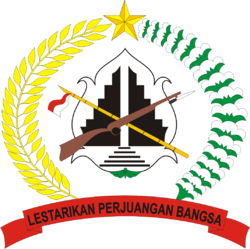
- Indonesian Army Territorial Center symbol
- Active: 3 February 1979
- Country: Indonesia
- Branch: Indonesian Army
- Type: Central Executive Agency
- Role: Territorial defense and development education and training
- Motto(s): Lestarikan Perjuangan Bangsa (Preserve the Nation's Struggle)
- March: Mars Teritorial
- Anniversaries: 3 February
- Website: www.pusterad.mil.id

Commanders
- Commander: Lieutenant General Teguh Muji Angkasa
- Deputy Commander: Major General Herianto Syahputra

The Indonesian Army Territorial Center (Indonesian: Pusat Teritorial Angkatan Darat, abbr. Pusterad) is an Indonesian Army Central Executive Agency under the Chief of Staff of the Army charged with building and maintaining the army's territorial defense and development functions to help the Army achieve its mission of contributing its efforts for the defense of the Indonesian nation and people and to sustain the continuing development of the Republic.

== Brief history ==
Established on 3 February 1979 as the then Army Territorial Development Service (Pusat Pengembangan Teritorial TNI-AD) under the Army Doctrine, Education and Training Development Command, the Territorial Center was formed as part of the national Total Defense and Security System (TDSS) (Indonesian: Sistem Pertahanan Keamanan Rakyat Semesta (Sishankamrata)) strategy to help train Army officers, warrant officers, non-commissioned officers and enlisted personnel to sustain the functions and capabilities of territorial defence within the Army and help develop and operate a community defence strategic plan for every village, subdistrict/district, regency, and city. To achieve its goals, the Territorial Defense Training School (Pusat Pendidikan Teritorial (Pusdikter)) in Bandung was also established at the same time to assist the education of Army personnel in the aspect of territorial defence and development. Renamed the Territorial Education Service, it was granted its present name and status in 2007 as a directly reporting unit of the office of the Chief of Staff of the Indonesian Army.

Today the Pusterad is charged as the lead Army agency training Army personnel in the following aspects:

- Territorial Defense Development and Education
- Territorial Defense System and Method Development
- Development of Territorial Defense Capabilities
- Territorial Defense Assessment and Development

== The TDSS System ==
The roots of Total Defense in Indonesian lands stems from the 1945 establishment of the Armed Forces and the 1948 decision for the creation of the Regional Military Commands. This was Sudirman's vision to develop a total national defense strategy for the young republic, combined with the long tradition of regional rebellions against foreign rule in the lands of the Republic.

In accordance with Law no.34 Series of 2004 - the Total Defense Act - the TDSS, which the Pusterad is charged for implementation within the territorial organization of the Republic, is defined as a universal defense system, which involves all citizens, territories and other national resources, and is prepared early by the national government and is carried out in a total, integrated, directed, sustainable and sustainable manner to achieve the following objectives:

- uphold state sovereignty
- maintain the territorial integrity of the unitary Republic of Indonesia
- protect the safety of the entire nation from every threat, domestic and foreign

== See also ==
- Indonesian Army
- Indonesian National Armed Forces
