= Elsham (organisation) =

Non-governmental organization

ELSHAM (abbreviation of Lembaga Studi dan Advokasi Hak Asasi Manusia, meaning Institute of Human Rights Studies and Advocacy) is a human rights non-governmental organization based in Jayapura, Papua, Indonesia. ELSHAM is the leading Papuan human rights organization. It was established in 1996 by the Roman Catholic Church, the Jayapura diocese of the Evangelical Christian Church in West Papua (GKI), and the Gospel Tabernacle Church of Indonesia (GKII).

ELSHAM leader John Rumbiak fled to the United States in 2002 following threats by the Indonesian police.

In June 2003 the Indonesian Military Commander, Maj. Gen. Nurdin Zainal, issued orders for the arrest of:

1. John Rumbiak, Supervisor of ELSHAM
2. Yohanis G. Bonay, Director of ELSHAM
3. Koran Tempo, a Jakarta-based daily
4. the editor of Koran Tempo
5. Suara Karya, a Jakarta-based daily
6. the editor of Suara Karya

upon charges of publishing a story about TNI (Indonesian military) troops ambushing a bus. The incident in question occurred August 31, 2002 when a bus carrying employees and family from the Freeport International school was attacked. Three teachers (including two Americans) were killed, 14 others were injured. Local statements and FBI investigations in 2003 attempted to tie the shooting to Papuan rebels, but the connection was unsupported by evidence.
