= Doctorandus =

Dutch academic title

Doctorandus (Dutch pronunciation: [dɔktoːˈrɑndʏs]; Latin for 'he who should become a doctor'; drs.) is a Dutch academic title according to the pre-Bachelor–Master system. The female form is doctoranda (dra.; this form is not commonly used). The title is acquired by passing the doctoraalexamen, the exam which usually concludes university study. Some students will continue to do research under the supervision of a professor, which eventually allows them to obtain the title of doctor.

In Dutch, the words doctoraal and doctoraat have different meanings, the first referring to the doctorandus, the second word referring to the doctorate phase or title. The word 'doctorandus' is based on the traditional principle that this degree is a prerequisite and intermediate step for obtaining a doctorate title. However, in the twentieth century the doctorandi have become considered to be graduates and when they can choose a scientific career, they do so usually as a paid promovendus and not as research students. An exception are medical students, where the doctoral exam is an intermediate step after which the students have to follow internships, in order to obtain the full medical degree of physician (arts in Dutch).

== Netherlands ==
According to Dutch legislation, the Dutch doctorandus degree is equivalent to the MA or MSc degree in English-speaking countries, with the difference that the coursework and comprehensive exams for a doctorate are included in the academic study. After being graduated to "drs.", the candidate can start with PhD-level research and writing the dissertation without any further exams.

The abbreviation is drs. This means that Dutch graduates who received the doctorandus title may sign like drs. A. Jansen. After the Bologna process, the title doctorandus has been replaced by the degrees MA and MSc, and those who receive such Dutch degrees may choose: they may use MA/MSc behind their name, or continue to use drs., mr. or ir., reflecting the field in which they graduated. According to Art. 7.20 of the Dutch law on higher education and scientific research, a graduate of a master's degree granted through scientific education (i.e. by a Dutch research university) may sign as ir. (ir. stems from the Dutch 'ingenieur' (engineer)) for those who graduated in an academic study of agriculture, natural environment or technical field, mr. (mr. stems from the Dutch meester (master) at law) for those who graduated in law and drs. by those who graduated in other fields. According to Art. 7.19a and the Dutch customs the degrees granted to such graduates are MSc for engineers, MA or MSc for doctoranduses and established by ministerial regulation for jurists (actually LLM). This means that two situations can be discerned:

1. Those who received their doctorandus title before the Bologna process have the option of signing like A. Jansen, M, since the old doctorandus title (from before the Bologna process) is similar to a master's degree, and the shortcut M may officially be used in order to render such title as an international title. This is especially useful when one has a combination of pre-Bologna and post-Bologna titles and degrees, since a combination of one or more recognized Dutch titles with one or more international degrees is not allowed. According to the Dutch Department of Education, "The termination 'of Arts' or the termination 'of Science' are namely legally protected and may only be used by those who have got a degree therein after the introduction of the Bachelor/Master curricula (2002)." In this respect, titles received before 1 September 2002 are considered old titles, while titles received after this date are considered new titles. The old titles ir., mr. or drs. may be borne as M behind one's name, since the Art. 7.22a of the Dutch Law on higher education and scientific research refers to the old Art. 7.21 of this law, which allowed those who bear such titles to use the M (from Master) behind their names; Art. 7.22a maintains the application of the old Art. 7.21 proviso for the old titles although the old Art. 7.21 article has been revoked (i.e. it does not apply to new titles).
2. Those who received their master's degree from Dutch research universities after the Bologna process in other fields than agriculture, natural environment, technical field and law may also bear the title doctorandus and alternatively have the option of signing like A. Jansen, MA or A. Jansen, MSc, but only as specified on their diploma. In this case, either a MA or a MSc is granted, which entitles one to bear the title doctorandus. This means that people who have graduated soon after 1 September 2002 have no (separate) bachelor's degree, but only a master's degree, which is their first degree.

== Belgium ==
In Belgium the title Drs. is only used for graduates working on a PhD, who eventually change their title from Drs. to Dr. The title Lic. (which stems from licentiaat) is used for those who have finished a masters' degree, but it is rarely used.

== Indonesia ==
The degree was also used in Indonesia until 1994 (because of Indonesia being a former colony of the Netherlands), where it was given to all bachelors except law, agriculture, natural environment, and engineering. The title ir. for academic engineers is still used in Indonesia by those who obtained their degree before 1994.

== In other countries ==
In Germany, Sweden, Norway and Estonia the term is used in the form "doktorand", with the same etymology: 'he who should become a doctor' (but dropping the gender qualifier) to refer to a student reading for his or her doctorate. However, it is not a formal title and is never written abbreviated. Similarly, in Romania it is "doctorand", abbreviated "drd."
