= Mardani Ali Sera =

Indonesian politician (born 1968)

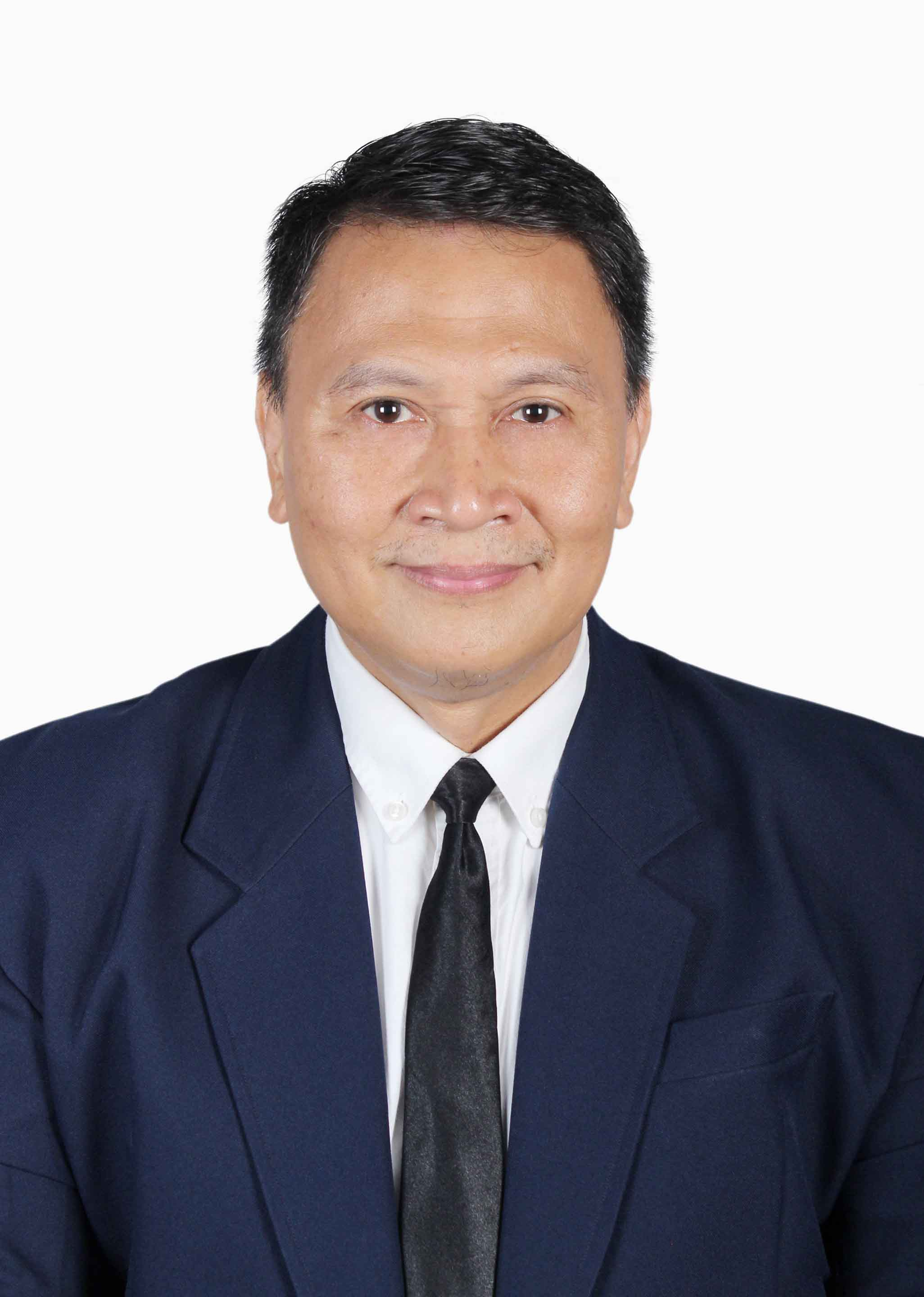

Member of the House of Representatives
- Incumbent
- Assumed office 23 February 2017; Interim replacement until 30 September 2019
- Preceded by: Sa'duddin
- Constituency: Jakarta I (since 2019); West Java VII (2017–2019)
- In office 19 October 2011 – 30 September 2014; Interim replacement
- Preceded by: Arifinto
- Constituency: West Java VII

Personal details
- Born: Mardani; 9 April 1968 (age 58) Jakarta, Indonesia
- Party: PKS
- Spouse: Siti Oniah (m. 1991)
- Education: University of Indonesia (S.T.); University of Technology Malaysia (MSc, PhD)

Mardani (born 9 April 1968), often known as Mardani Ali Sera, is an Indonesian academic and politician of the Prosperous Justice Party. He is a member of the House of Representatives, having served since 2017, and between 2011–2014. He is also known for initiating the #2019GantiPresiden movement during the 2019 Indonesian presidential election.

== Early life ==
Mardani was born on 9 April 1968 in Jakarta to M. Ali Sera and Rohati. He studied in Jakarta, graduating from State High School No. 1 Jakarta in 1987. He attended university at the University of Indonesia, receiving a bachelors degree in mechanical engineering in 1992. He continued his studies in Malaysia, receiving a masters in 2000 and a PhD in 2004, both from the University of Technology Malaysia.

== Career ==
After graduating from the University of Indonesia, Mardani began lecturing at Mercu Buana University. He was a founding member of the Prosperous Justice Party (PKS), having been active in Islamic student organizations since his time at high school. Within the party, he was elected deputy secretary general for 2015–2020, and chairman of the committee on technology, industry and the environment for 2020–2025.

Mardani ran as a legislative candidate in West Java's 7th electoral district during the 2009 legislative election, but placed second among PKS candidates and did not qualify. Following the resignation of the district's PKS legislator Arifinto in 2011 due to a scandal, Mardani was appointed to replace him and was sworn in on 19 October 2011. He ran for reelection in the same district in the 2014 legislative election, but again was not elected. On 23 February 2017, Mardani was again appointed as a replacement to fellow PKS politician Sa'duddin (also of West Java's 7th electoral district) in the People's Representative Council, as the latter had resigned to run in the regency elections of Bekasi. He had been considered as a potential candidate to become Vice Governor of Jakarta, first for the 2017 gubernatorial election, and later to fill the vacancy when Sandiaga Uno resigned from his post as Vice Governor.

In the leadup to the 2019 presidential election, Mardani founded and led the 2019GantiPresiden ("Replace the President 2019") social media campaign in 2018. The campaign also promoted Prabowo Subianto's presidential campaign, and included merchandise and an anthem. Throughout its life, the campaign generated significant controversy – with Mardani complaining about government interference after authorities limited his movements during a visit to West Kalimantan citing security reasons. After the presidential election concluded, Mardani disbanded the campaign, commenting that he made it "haram" for himself to speak of replacing the president.

Also in 2019, Mardani ran in the legislative election from Jakarta's 1st electoral district, and was elected after winning 155,285 votes, the highest of the six elected representatives in the district. He has been part of the legislature's Second Commission since 2017. He was reelected for a second full term in the 2024 election with 176,584 votes.

== Personal life ==
Mardani married Siti Oniah in 1991, and the couple has nine children.
