= Prabowo Subianto 2019 presidential campaign =

Indonesian political campaign

Prabowo Subianto for President
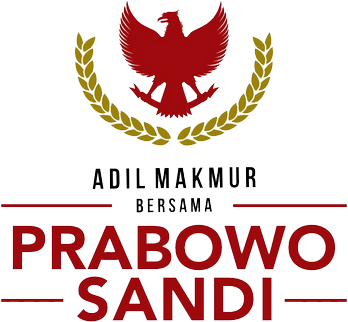
- Campaign: 2019 Indonesian presidential election
- Candidate: Prabowo Subianto; Chairman of the Gerindra (2014–present); Commander of Kostrad (1998); Sandiaga Uno; Vice Governor of Jakarta (2017–2018)
- Affiliation: Just and Prosperous Indonesia Coalition
- Status: Registered: 10 August 2018; Authorized: 20 September 2018; Lost election: 21 May 2019
- Key people: Chief executive: Djoko Santoso; Secretary: Ahmad Hanafi Rais
- Slogan(s): Indonesia Adil Makmur (Just and Prosperous Indonesia); Indonesia Menang (Indonesia Triumphs) #2019GantiPresiden (2019 We Change the President)

Website
- prabowo-sandi.com

Prabowo Subianto's presidential campaign in 2019 or Gerakan Nasional #2019GantiPresiden was his second presidential bid, following his loss to Joko Widodo (Jokowi) in the 2014 Indonesian presidential election. His running mate was businessman and former Jakarta deputy governor Sandiaga Uno.

Backed by a coalition of five political parties representing 40 percent of the seats in the People's Representative Council, Prabowo received his first official endorsement from his own party Gerindra in April 2018, with the other parties' support being secured in August 2018.

After quick counts and official counting indicated likely victory for Jokowi, Prabowo declared he would reject the results, insisting there had been excessive fraud.

== Background ==
After being Megawati Soekarnoputri's running mate in the 2009 Indonesian presidential election, Prabowo Subianto made his first bid for the presidency in the 2014 Indonesian presidential election. He was defeated by Joko Widodo, who won 53.15% of the vote. Previously, during the 2012 Jakarta gubernatorial election which saw Jokowi be elected Governor of Jakarta, Prabowo had supported him.

Between 2014 and 2019, Prabowo remained second to Jokowi in most opinion polls. The opposition coalition was initially a majority, until several parties defected to the government side.

== Team ==
Prabowo's campaign team was headed by former Commander of the Indonesian National Armed Forces Djoko Santoso. The team also included former president Susilo Bambang Yudhoyono (as a national campaigner), in addition to various opposition political figures such as Rachmawati Sukarnoputri and Ahmad Muzani.

The campaign team set up a national secretariat in Surakarta, just 1.1 kilometres (0.68 miles) away from Jokowi's private residence there, in addition to a post 450 metres (1,480 ft) away. Coordinators claimed the proximity of the bases was coincidental.

== Timeline ==
=== Pre-registration ===
After initial uncertainties over whether Prabowo would run himself or endorse another presidential candidate or even become Jokowi's running mate, Gerindra, which Prabowo co-founded and leads, officially endorsed his second presidential bid on 11 April 2018. Following electoral laws, Gerindra by itself did not have enough votes to endorse Prabowo and needed to form a coalition. The coalition ended up comprising Gerindra, the Democratic Party (Demokrat), the Islamist parties Prosperous Justice Party (PKS) and National Mandate Party (PAN), along with first-time party Berkarya. The parties in total represent 40 percent of the seats in the People's Representative Council and 36 percent of the popular vote in the 2014 Indonesian legislative election.

Prior to the registration, Prabowo's coalition discussed the running mate, bringing up the possibility of selecting figures such as Anies Baswedan or following suggestions from coalition parties and Islamist groups, including Yudhoyono's son Agus Harimurti Yudhoyono or popular preacher Abdul Somad. Eventually, in what Uno himself described as a "last-minute decision", Jakarta Vice Governor and Gerindra cadre Sandiaga Uno was appointed as Prabowo's running mate. According to a statement by a National Mandate Party politician, the coalition parties only agreed on Uno as Prabowo's running mate "half an hour" before the pair's formal declaration on 9 August. As part of the deal, Uno must renounce his membership in Gerindra, making him an independent.

=== Campaigning ===
After being verified, Prabowo-Uno was assigned the ballot number 2 on 21 September 2018. The pair's campaigned team split the two into separate regions for campaigning to maximize coverage - for example, on the first day of official campaigning at 23 September, Prabowo attended formal events in Jakarta while Uno visited multiple locations in Central Java. Uno stated that his campaigning will focus in Central Java - with 818 locations visited being officially recorded by KPU by early December 2018.

In response to multiple regional leaders publicly endorsing Jokowi's reelection, Prabowo's campaign team requested regional leaders who supported him to "stay calm" and focus on developing their respective regions. On 14 January 2019, Prabowo gave a national speech at the Jakarta Convention Center, titled "Indonesia Menang" ("Indonesia Wins"), where he called for a national reorientation of development and management.

On Sunday, 7 April 2019, Prabowo and Uno held an open rally, the largest during their campaigning period, in the Gelora Bung Karno Stadium. Democratic Party leader and former president Susilo Bambang Yudhoyono (who is part of Prabowo's camp) criticized the rally for being "too exclusive" with Islamic activities dominating.

During the final candidate debate on 13 April 2019, Prabowo stated that Indonesian economic issues originated partly from Jokowi's predecessors. The statement was heavily attacked by members of the Democratic Party - who saw the statement as an attack to Yudhoyono.

=== Post-voting ===
Hours after the voting on 17 April 2019, Prabowo claimed victory in the election, citing internal exit polls despite most survey agencies releasing quick count results of the opposite. Later, he declared that real count results showed that he won with 62 percent of the votes.

Upon announcement of the official results on 21 May, Prabowo rejected it, and stated that he would bring the results to court.

== Positions ==
During a campaign speech, Prabowo declared that he aimed to achieve food self-sufficiency and to minimize imports to strategic goods. His campaign promises also included adding more items to the determination of the minimum wage in the country, limiting both outsourcing and foreign workers, removing land and property tax for utilized housing, and limiting the use of debt financing in the national budget to productive sectors. Another promise was to reduce income taxes and to lift the tax-free bracket higher, from the value of Rp4.5 million (US$300) a month in 2018. Prabowo also stated during the first debates that he aimed to increase the Indonesian tax ratio to 16 percent - compared to 12.1 percent in 2019.

== Finances ==
By November 2018, Prabowo's campaign team had reported Rp41.9 billion in receipts (~US$3 million), mostly contributions from Prabowo and Uno, and expenditures of Rp34.5 billion (~US$2.4 million). During an interview, the campaign team leader Djoko Santoso remarked that the team had limited funding, and did not expect much external funding. In order to raise funds for the campaign, Uno sold his shares at his publicly listed company Saratoga Investama - raising around Rp300 billion (~US$20 million) by October 2018.

== Controversies ==
During his campaign, Prabowo was accused of spreading pessimism and exercising Donald Trump's 2016 campaign strategy of highlighting economic disparity. In a speech in October 2018, Prabowo said he wants to "Make Indonesia Great Again", much like Trump's 2016 campaign slogan. The slogan was also used by one of his most prominent supporters, Fadli Zon, in 2017. Prabowo accused the media of "manipulating" attendance figures at the 212 "Mujahideen" Grand Reunion on 2 December 2018. Prabowo addressed the rally, at which participants shouted his name combined with the takbir.

In a campaign speech in Surabaya, Jokowi accused Prabowo's campaign team of disseminating hateful propaganda aided by foreign consultants, citing "Russian propaganda" and the "firehose of falsehood" model. Russia's ambassador to Indonesia, Lyudmila Vorobyeva, denied that Russia intervenes in the domestic affairs of other countries.

Prabowo has close relationships with fundamental Muslims, such as Muhammad Rizieq Shihab of the Islamic Defenders Front. Rizieq, who is in hiding in Mecca, persistently campaigned against Jokowi and for Prabowo. Prabowo also promised to bring Rizieq home should he elected. When asked about FPI's support, Prabowo's brother Hashim Djojohadikusumo said he accepted everyone who wants to support Prabowo as he wanted to win.

== Coalition parties ==
- Gerindra Party
- National Mandate Party (PAN)
- Prosperous Justice Party (PKS)
- Democratic Party (Demokrat)
- Berkarya Party

== See also ==
- Prabowo Subianto 2014 presidential campaign
- Prabowo Subianto 2024 presidential campaign
