= 2019 Indonesian general election =

- 17 April 2019
- Presidential election
- Registered: 192,770,611 (▼0.61%)
- Turnout: 81.97% (▲12.39pp)
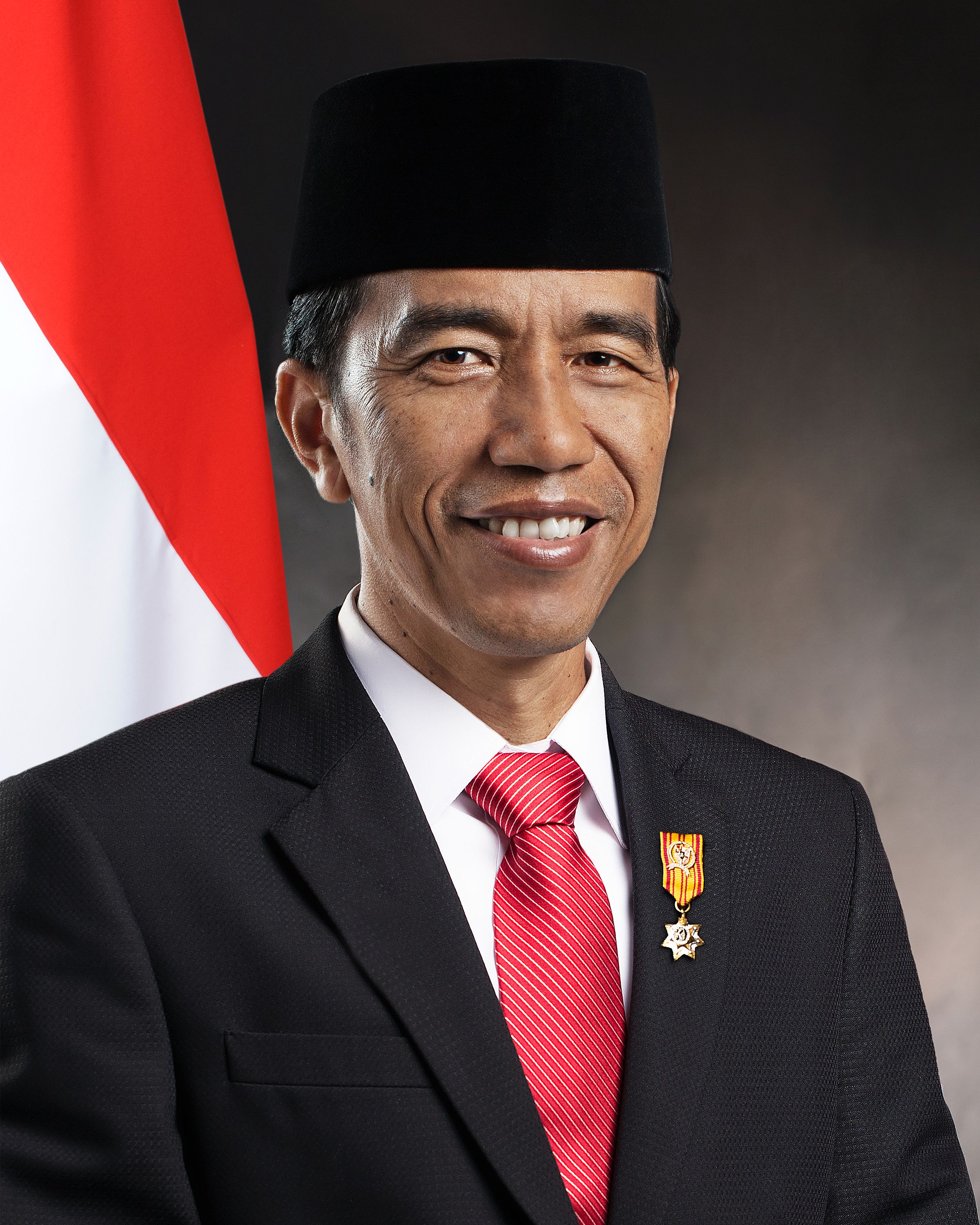

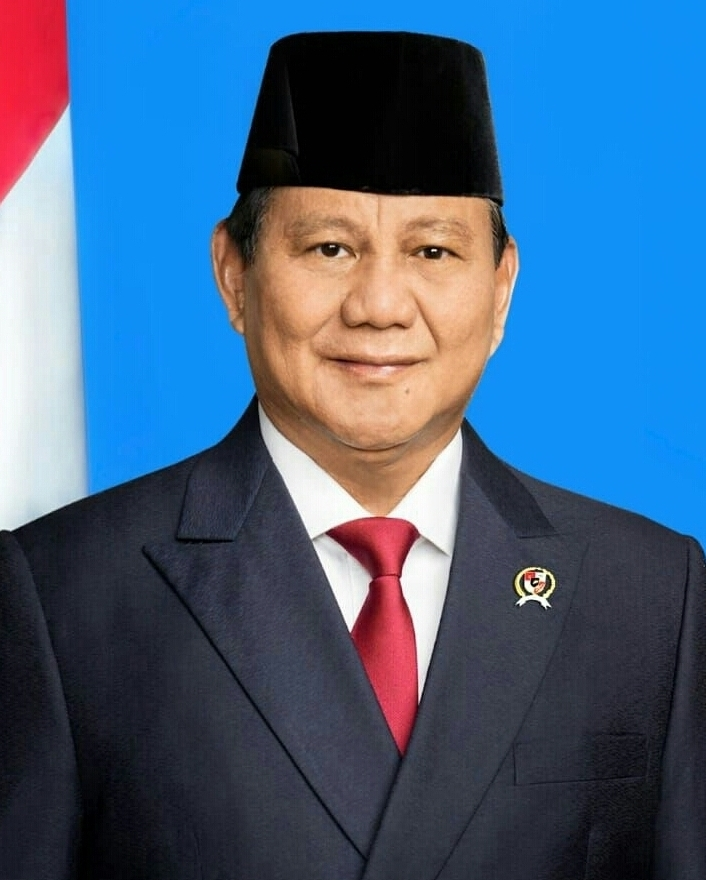
Candidate	Joko Widodo	Prabowo Subianto
Party	PDI-P	Gerindra
Alliance	Onward Indonesia (Note: Including the PDI-P, Golkar, the National Awakening Party, the United Development Party, the NasDem Party, the People's Conscience Party, the Indonesian Justice and Unity Party, the Crescent Star Party, the Indonesian Solidarity Party, and the Perindo Party.)	Just and Prosperous Indonesia (Note: Including Gerindra, the Democratic Party, the National Mandate Party, the Prosperous Justice Party, and the Berkarya Party.)
Running mate	Ma'ruf Amin	Sandiaga Uno
Popular vote	85,607,362	68,650,239
Percentage	55.50%	44.50%
President before election
Joko Widodo
PDI-P
Elected President
Joko Widodo
PDI-P
- Legislative election
- All 575 seats in the House of Representatives; 288 seats needed for a majority
- Turnout: 81.69% (▲7.16pp)
Party	Leader	Vote %	Seats	+/–
PDI-P	Megawati Sukarnoputri	19.33	128	+19
Gerindra	Prabowo Subianto	12.57	78	+5
Golkar	Airlangga Hartarto	12.31	85	−6
PKB	Muhaimin Iskandar	9.69	58	+11
NasDem	Surya Paloh	9.05	59	+24
PKS	Sohibul Iman	8.21	50	+10
Demokrat	Susilo Bambang Yudhoyono	7.77	54	−7
PAN	Zulkifli Hasan	6.84	44	−5
PPP	Suharso Monoarfa	4.52	19	−20
This lists parties that won seats. See the complete results below.
Results by electoral district
Speaker before	Speaker after
Bambang Soesatyo; Golkar	Puan Maharani; PDI-P

General elections were held in Indonesia on 17 April 2019. For the first time in the country's history, the president, the vice president, members of the People's Consultative Assembly (MPR), and members of local legislative bodies (DPRD) were elected on the same day with over 190 million eligible voters. Sixteen parties participated in the elections nationally, including four new parties.

The presidential election, the fourth in the country's history, used a direct, simple majority system, with incumbent president Joko Widodo, known as Jokowi, running for re-election with senior Muslim cleric Ma'ruf Amin as his running mate against former general Prabowo Subianto and former Jakarta vice governor Sandiaga Uno for a five-year term between 2019 and 2024. The election was a rematch of the 2014 presidential election, in which Jokowi defeated Prabowo. The legislative election, which was the 12th such election for Indonesia, saw over 240,000 candidates competing for over 20,000 seats in the MPR and local councils for provinces and cities or regencies, with over 8,000 competing for the People's Representative Council (DPR) seats alone. The election was described as "one of the most complicated single-day ballots in global history." Jokowi's 85.6 million votes were the most votes cast for a single candidate in any democratic election in Indonesia's history, exceeding the record of his predecessor Susilo Bambang Yudhoyono, who won 73.8 million votes in 2009. His successor Prabowo Subianto surpassed his record in the 2024 election winning with more than 96 million votes.

On 21 May 2019, the General Elections Commission (KPU) declared Jokowi victorious in the presidential election, with over 55% of the vote. Widodo's PDI-P finished first in the DPR election with 19.33%, followed by Prabowo's Gerindra with 12.57%, then Golkar with 12.31%, the National Awakening Party (PKB) with 9.69%, the NasDem Party with 9.05%, and the Prosperous Justice Party (PKS) with 8.21%.

In this election, Joko Widodo's coalition secured a majority in Gorontalo, a province previously held by the opposition. Simultaneously, Prabowo Subianto's coalition gained electoral victories in Southeast Sulawesi, Jambi, South Sulawesi, and Bengkulu.

Following the election, reports of the more than 7 million election workers, among which 569 had died during the lengthy voting and counting process, surfaced. Prabowo's campaign team claimed that the deaths were linked to fraud that disadvantaged him. As of 9 May 2019, the election commission (KPU) said the dead included 456 election officers, 91 supervisory agents and 22 police officers.

In the early morning of 22 May 2019, supporters of Prabowo protested in Jakarta against Jokowi's victory. The protest turned into a riot, which left eight people killed by security officers and over 600 injured.

== Background ==
Elections in Indonesia were previously held separately, with a 2008 elections law regulating that presidential and legislative elections be held at least three months apart from one another. Following a 2013 Constitutional Court lawsuit, however, it was decided that the 2019 elections – which would have been the 12th legislative election and the 4th presidential election – would be held simultaneously. The stated intent of the simultaneous election was to reduce associated costs and minimize transactional politics, in addition to increasing voter turnout.

In the 2014 presidential election, Jakarta governor Joko Widodo defeated former general Prabowo Subianto to become the seventh President of Indonesia. Despite initially having a minority government, Jokowi later managed to secure the support of Golkar and the United Development Party, giving him control of the legislature. In the legislative elections of the same year, former opposition party PDI-P managed to secure the largest share in the DPR, ahead of Golkar and Gerindra.

Despite plans to introduce electronic voting, the DPR in March 2017 announced it would not mandate e-voting in the 2019 elections because of hacking fears and because of the lack of nationwide internet coverage. On 7 April 2017, the KPU, the General Election Supervisory Agency (Bawaslu) and the Ministry of Home Affairs held a meeting with the People's Representative Council's special committee to deliberate a draft law concerning the 2019 elections. The Chairman of the House special committee deliberating the bill, Lukman Edy, announced on 25 April 2017 that Wednesday, 17 April 2019, had been agreed upon as the date for the elections.

Nominations of candidates for the national and regional legislatures as well as candidates for president and vice president were completed in September 2018. The campaign period was from 13 October 2018 to 13 April 2019 followed by a three-day election silence before the voting day on 17 April. The final results were planned to be announced on 22 May, while the inauguration of the president and vice president was scheduled for 20 October 2019.

== Electoral system ==
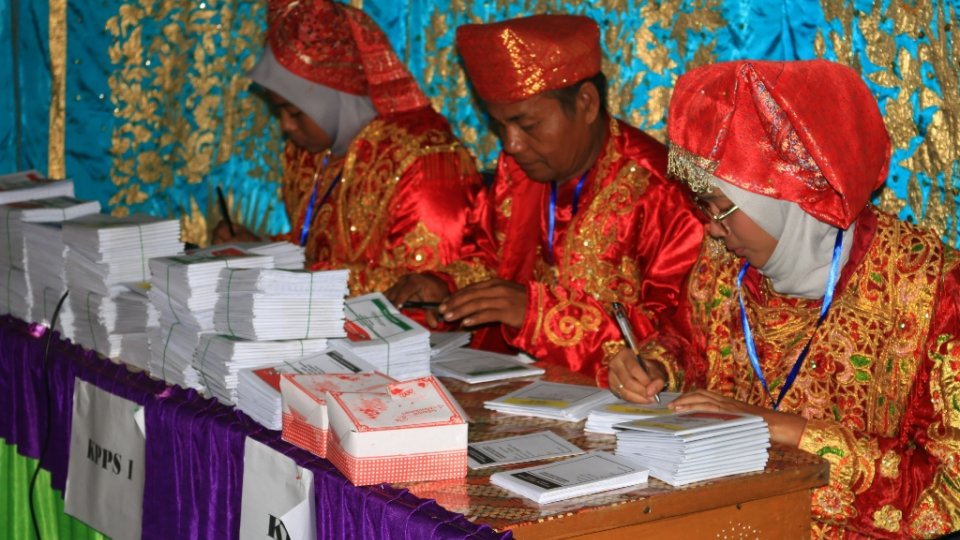
Election workers wearing traditional Minang wedding costumes at a polling station in Pariaman City, West Sumatra

The election was regulated by Law No. 7 of 2017. The KPU, a legally independent government body was responsible for organizing the election. In addition, the vote was monitored by the Bawaslu, which also had the authority to rule on violations of election rules (e.g. administrative errors, vote-buying, etc.). Any ethical violations committed by either Bawaslu or the KPU were to be handled by the Elections Organizer Honor Council (Dewan Kehormatan Penyelenggara Pemilu DKPP), which consists of one member from each body and five others recommended by the government.

Voters were given five ballot papers: (Note: Except for voters in Jakarta, who did not vote for the regency/municipal council and only received four ballot papers and overseas voters who only voted for the president/vice president and DPR.) for the president and vice president, Regional Representative Council (DPD), People's Representative Council (DPR), provincial council, and regency/municipal council (DPRD Provinsi and DPRD Kabupaten/Kota) members. Voters used a nail to poke a hole in the ballot paper indicating which party or candidate they wish to vote for, and then dip their fingers in ink as a precaution against voter fraud. Tabulation of the votes was done manually on paper. The KPU is legally required to announce the results of the election within 35 days of the vote, i.e., before 22 May 2019.

=== Presidential vote ===
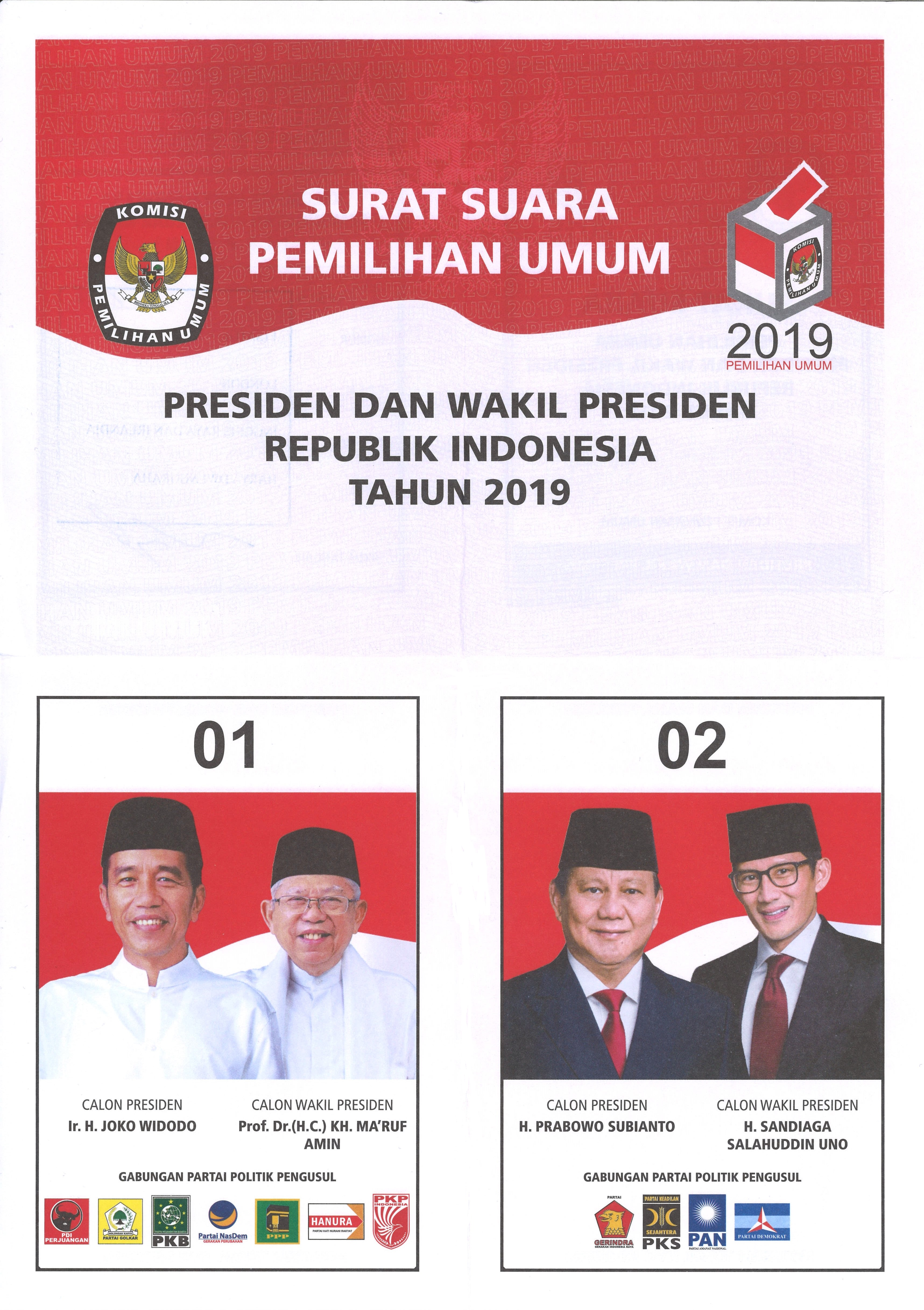
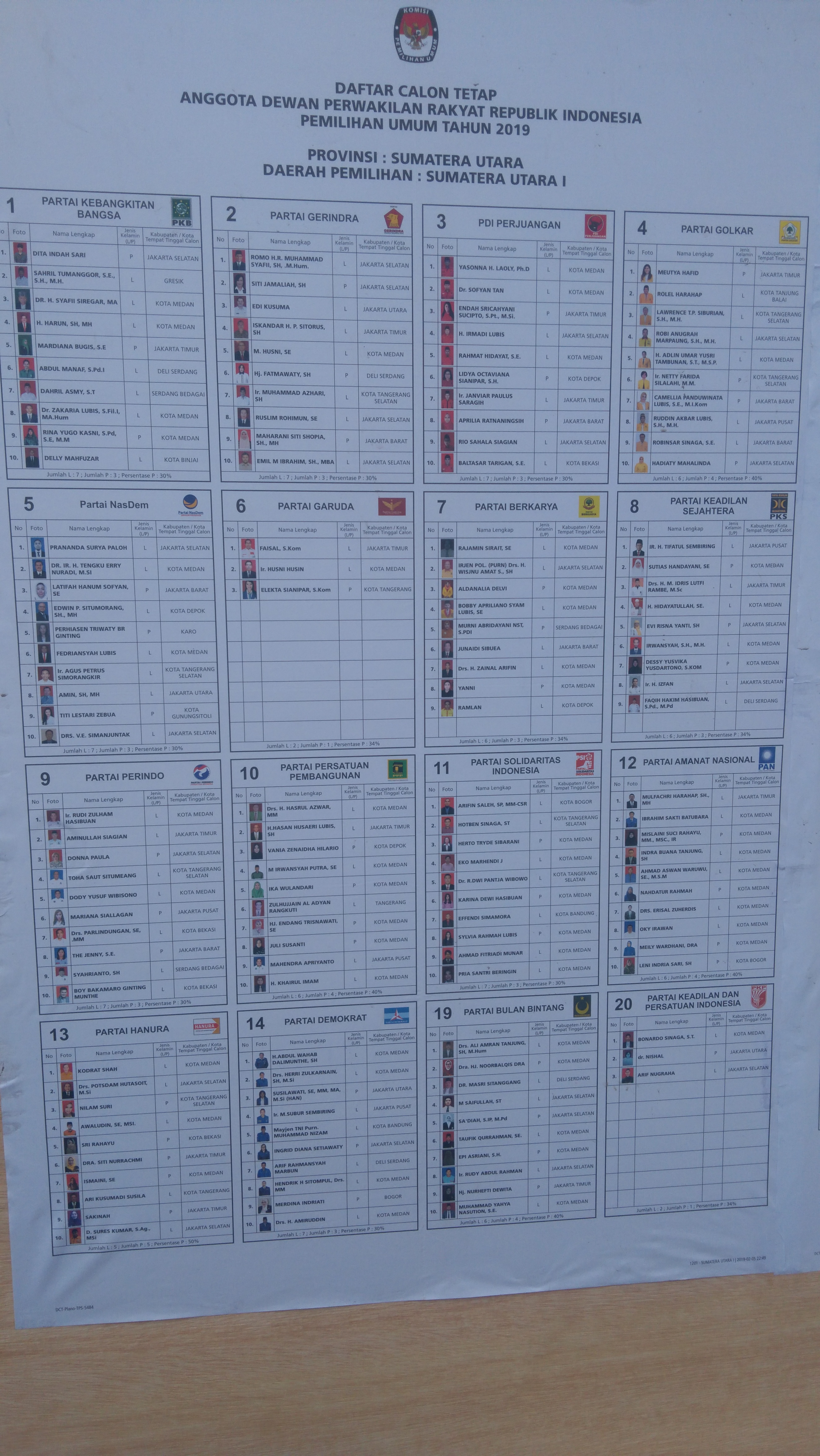
- Left: A sample ballot paper for the presidential election
- Right: List of legislative candidates from North Sumatra's 1st electoral district

To run for the presidency, a candidate had to be supported by political parties totalling 20% of the seats in the DPR or 25% of the popular vote in the previous legislative election.^{:Art. 222} Political parties were allowed to remain neutral if they were unable to propose their own candidate. However, if a neutral party(s) was able to endorse their own candidate, they were required to do so, or face being barred from participating in the next election.^{:Art. 235}

The voting procedure followed a two-round system, with voters simply choosing one of the candidate pairs. A winning candidate was required to win a majority and at least 20% of the votes in over half of Indonesia's provinces. If no candidate pairs had fulfilled the criterion, the election would have to be repeated with a maximum of two participants.^{:Art. 416}

=== Legislative vote ===
Members of both the DPR and the Regional People's Representative Councils (DPRD) were elected from multi-member electoral districts through voting with an open list system, and seat distribution is done with the Sainte-Laguë method in contrast to previous elections which utilised the Hare quota. There was a gender quota requiring at least 30% of registered candidates to be female.

A 4% parliamentary threshold was set for parties to be represented in the DPR, though candidates could still win seats in the regional councils provided they won sufficient votes. There were 575 DPR seats contested – up from 560 in 2014. Nationally, there were 80 DPR electoral districts, with 272 provincial and 2,206 municipal electoral districts. Candidates for the DPD were not allowed to be members of a political party. Four members were elected for each province – a total of 136.

== Voters ==
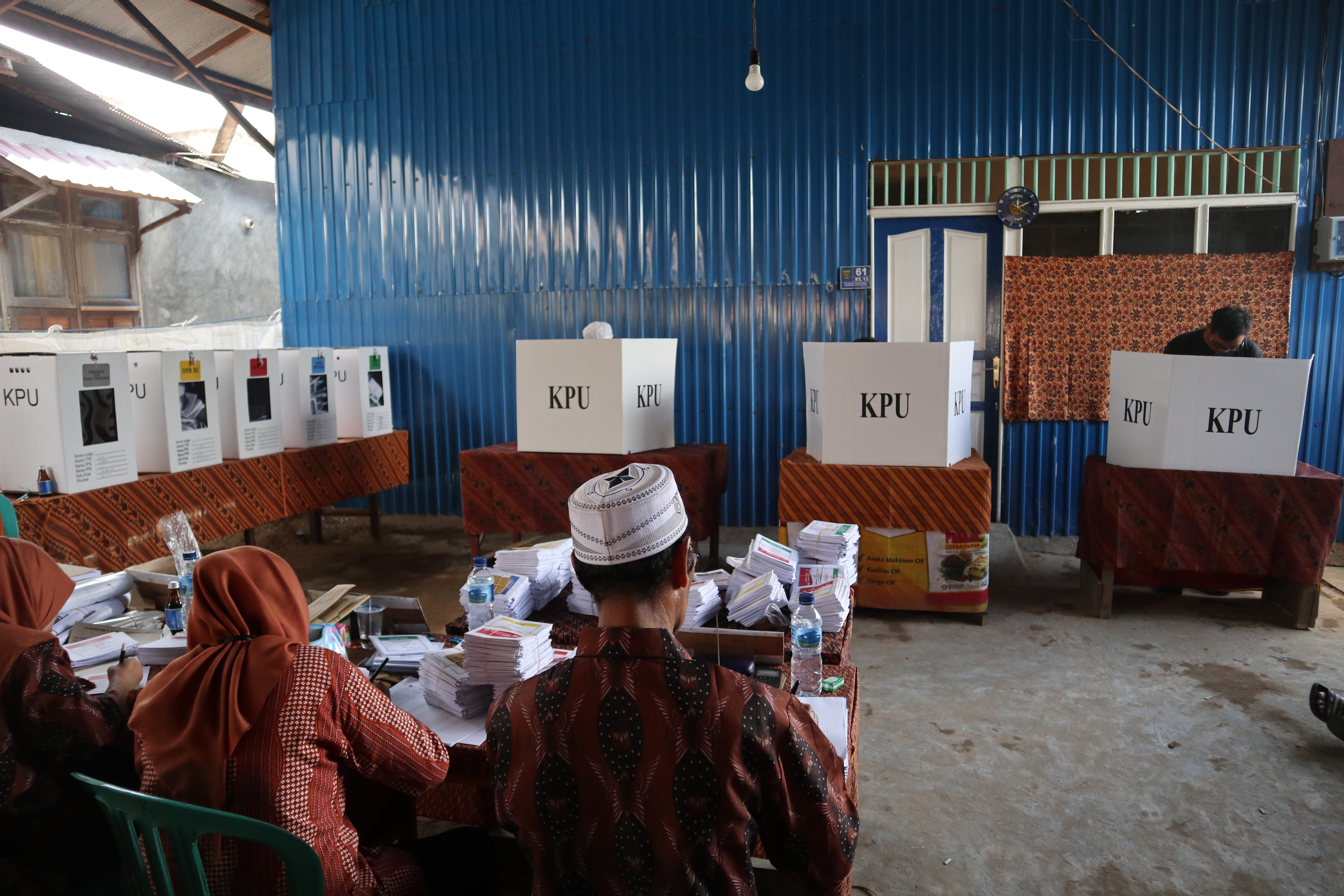
A voting station in Samarinda, East Kalimantan.

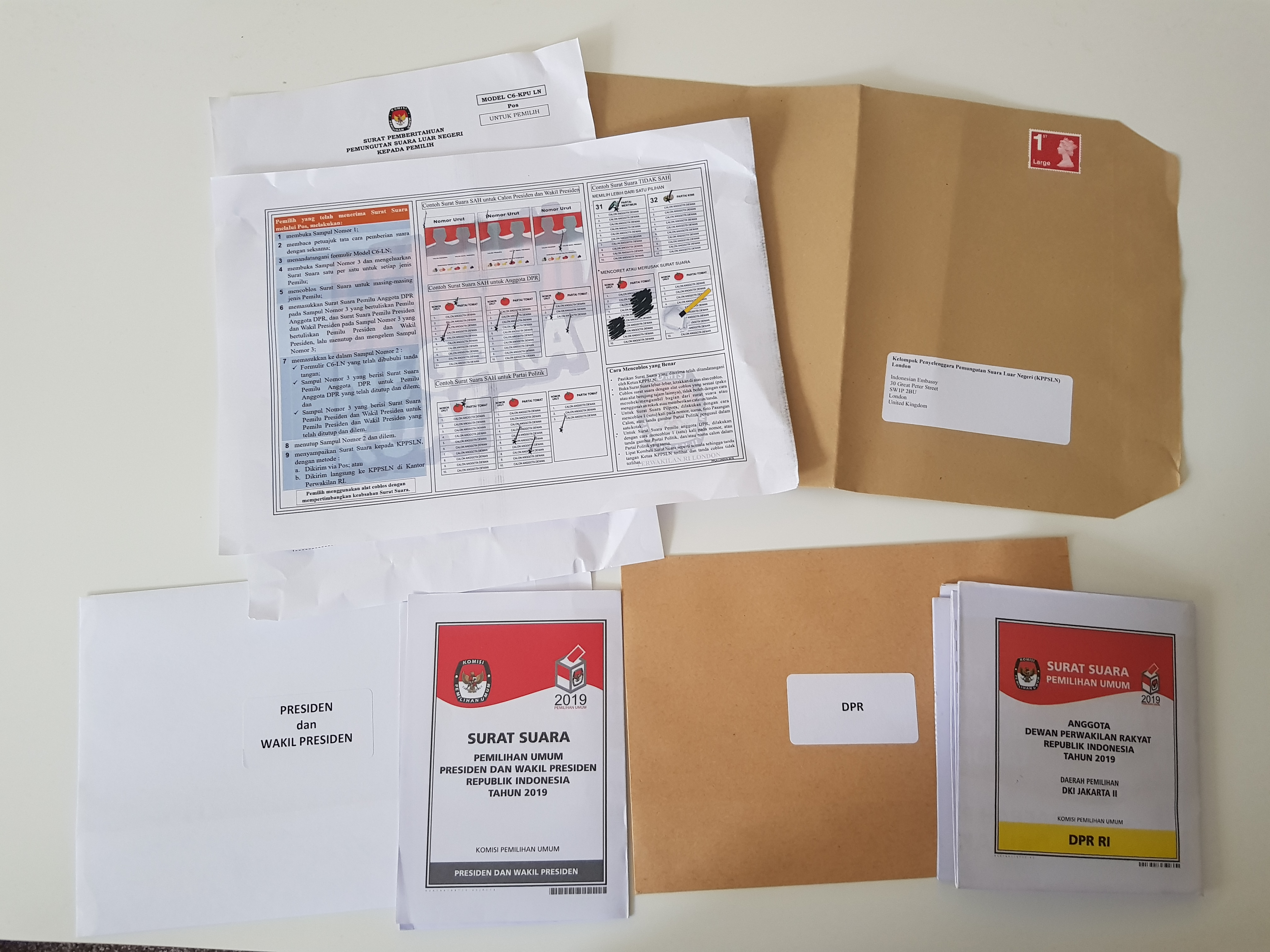
Postal voting documents sent to an Indonesian voter in the United Kingdom.

The voting age for the election is 17, or less if already married. In practice, the Marriage Law 16 of 2019 raised the minimum age of marriage for women from 16 to 19 (in line with men), unless given a dispensation by the Indonesian Supreme Court. This means there will be, by 2024, practically no-one under the age of 17 qualified to vote, despite this being allowed for under election Law. Indonesians living overseas could vote in either the embassies and consulates, mobile polling stations, or by post, with the voting taking place on 8–14 April.

On 5 September 2018, the KPU announced there were 187 million registered voters – 185,732,093 in Indonesia and 2,049,791 voting abroad. They were to vote at 805,075 polling stations in Indonesia, with mail-in votes and 620 polling stations outside the country. A large number of polling stations (which was updated in April 2019 to 810,329) meant that there was an average of 200 voters per station, compared to 600 in the 2014 election. Around 17 million people are involved in some way in running the election, including the election officers, polling station guards, and registered witnesses from the candidates and parties.

Later on, 670,000 names were removed following complaints of duplicates in the voter registry, lowering the total voter count to around 187.1 million. Further investigations resulted in over 1 million duplicate voters discovered in Papua alone in October, out of the initial voter registry of 3 million. Bawaslu commissioners in early September estimated that there would be around 2 million duplicate voters, while opposition party Gerindra stated that they only had 137 million voters in their internal registry, and claimed that they found 25 million duplicate names in the registry. The figure was later updated to 192.8 million voters, including 2 million overseas.

Due to various logistical issues, namely with the distribution of ballot papers, 2,249 polling stations had to conduct follow-up voting. A repeat vote was also recommended in the Kuala Lumpur embassy due to suspected voter fraud and a follow-up election in Sydney due to the voting station there closing early.

== Contesting parties ==
A total of 27 political parties registered with the KPU to run in the election. On 17 February 2018, the KPU announced that 14 parties had passed the verification precedes and would be eligible to contest the legislative election. The PBB subsequently appealed to the Bawaslu, which ruled it could participate, making a total of 15 parties. The PKPI's appeal to Bawaslu was rejected, but an 11 April ruling by the National Administrative Court (Pengadilan Tata Usaha Negara) decreed that the party was eligible to contest in the election. A further four parties contested in Aceh only.

Ballot number	English name	Indonesian name	Leader	Ideology
1	National Awakening Party	Partai Kebangkitan Bangsa (PKB)	Muhaimin Iskandar	Pluralism
2	Gerindra Party	Partai Gerakan Indonesia Raya (Gerindra)	Prabowo Subianto	Right-wing populism
3	Indonesian Democratic Party of Struggle	Partai Demokrasi Indonesia Perjuangan (PDI-P)	Megawati Sukarnoputri	Marhaenism
4	Golkar	Partai Golongan Karya	Airlangga Hartarto	Developmentalism
5	NasDem Party	Partai NasDem	Surya Paloh	Liberalism
6	Garuda Party	Partai Gerakan Perubahan Indonesia (Partai Garuda)	Ahmad Ridha Sabana	Centrism
7	Berkarya Party	Partai Berkarya	Tommy Suharto	New order revivalism
8	Prosperous Justice Party	Partai Keadilan Sejahtera (PKS)	Sohibul Iman	Post-Islamism
9	Perindo Party	Partai Persatuan Indonesia (Perindo)	Hary Tanoesoedibjo	Populism
10	United Development Party	Partai Persatuan Pembangunan (PPP)	Suharso Monoarfa	Religious pluralism
11	Indonesian Solidarity Party	Partai Solidaritas Indonesia (PSI)	Grace Natalie	Progressivism
12	National Mandate Party	Partai Amanat Nasional (PAN)	Zulkifli Hasan	Religious nationalism
13	People's Conscience Party	Partai Hati Nurani Rakyat (Hanura)	Oesman Sapta Odang	Centrism
14	Democratic Party	Partai Demokrat	Susilo Bambang Yudhoyono	Centrism
19 (Note: Ballot numbers 15 to 18 are assigned to local parties in the province of Aceh)	Crescent Star Party	Partai Bulan Bintang (PBB)	Yusril Ihza Mahendra	Islamism
20	Indonesian Justice and Unity Party	Partai Keadilan dan Persatuan Indonesia (PKPI)	Diaz Hendropriyono	Centrism

The four Aceh local parties were:

Ballot number	English name	Indonesian name	Leader
15	Aceh Party	Partai Aceh	Muzakir Manaf
16	Independent Voice of the Acehnese Party	Partai Suara Independen Rakyat Aceh	Muhammad Nazar
17	Aceh Regional Party	Partai Daerah Aceh	Jamaluddin Thaib
18	Aceh Nanggroe Party	Partai Nanggroe Aceh	Irwandi Yusuf

== Presidential election ==
=== Candidates ===
In July 2017, the People's Representative Council (DPR) confirmed that only parties or coalitions with at least 20% of seats in the legislature, or 25% of votes in the previous election, would be eligible to submit a presidential candidate. Requirements for presidential/vice-presidential candidates were similar, with only either Indonesia-born lifelong Indonesian citizens or naturalised citizens who were born abroad and obtained foreign citizenship outside their own will being eligible to run with a minimum age of 40 and a requirement to "have a belief in the One and Only God." If the candidates had spouses, they also had to be Indonesian citizens. A criminal record resulting in over five years of incarceration or an active bankruptcy bar a candidate from running. A term limit of two terms prevented incumbent Vice President Jusuf Kalla from running as a vice-presidential candidate.^{:Art. 169}

Except for the PAN, all parties in the government coalition supported a second term for Jokowi. In total, nine parties running in the legislative election supported Jokowi, with the coalition having met formally by May 2018. Of those nine parties, Perindo and PSI were participating for the first time. Shortly after Ma'ruf was declared as Jokowi's VP candidate, Jokowi's coalition member party PPP leader Muhammad Romahurmuziy stated that the coalition, dubbed Koalisi Indonesia Kerja (lit. "Working Indonesia Coalition"), was final, and would not accept any more parties. In total, the coalition gained over 62% of the votes during the 2014 legislative election and controlled 337 of 560 DPR seats.

Aside from Gerindra, parties backing Prabowo did not confirm their support until late: PAN and PKS on 9 August 2018, Demokrat and Berkarya on 10 August, the registration day, though the coalition had existed prior. PAN withdrew from the government coalition, resulting in the resignation of bureaucratic reform minister and PAN member Asman Abnur. The pro-Prabowo coalition was namedJust and Prosperous Indonesia. There are five parties in the coalition – including Berkarya, a new party – which won 36% of the 2014 legislative vote and holds 223 of 560 DPR seats.

Two parties – PBB (participated in the 2014 election, but did not gain a national legislature seat) and the Garuda Party (a new party) – initially did not endorse either candidate. The latter's secretary Abdullah Mansyuri stated the party was focusing on the legislative elections, while PBB chairman Yusril Ihza Mahendra said neither Jokowi nor Prabowo's camp invited PBB. Later on, however, he would join Jokowi's campaign team as its lawyer. On 27 January 2019, PBB officially endorsed Jokowi. The Aceh Nanggroe Party – which held 3 of the 81 seats in Aceh's provincial council – also endorsed Jokowi in January 2019.

Registration for presidential candidates was opened between 4 and 10 August 2018 at the KPU head office in Jakarta. Neither candidate declared their vice presidential pick until 9 August 2018. Both picks were considered "surprising," with Jokowi selecting senior cleric and politician Ma'ruf Amin despite early reports that former Chief Justice of the Constitutional Court Mahfud MD would be selected. Prabowo's last-minute selection of businessman and Jakarta Vice Governor Sandiaga Uno – close to midnight on that day – was also unexpected. Sandiaga was not mentioned in the early phases of the selection.

Known as	Party	English name	Supporting	DPR seats (2014)	DPR seats % (2014)	Legislative votes % (2014)
PDI-P	Partai Demokrasi Indonesia Perjuangan	Indonesian Democratic Party of Struggle	Nominee: Joko Widodo (PDI-P); Running mate: Ma'ruf Amin (Independent)	Majority coalition: PDI-P/Golkar/PPP/ Hanura/NasDem/PKB 337 / 560	60.36%	63.62%
Golkar	Partai Golongan Karya	Golkar	Nominee: Joko Widodo (PDI-P); Running mate: Ma'ruf Amin (Independent)	Majority coalition: PDI-P/Golkar/PPP/ Hanura/NasDem/PKB 337 / 560	60.36%	63.62%
PPP	Partai Persatuan Pembangunan	United Development Party	Nominee: Joko Widodo (PDI-P); Running mate: Ma'ruf Amin (Independent)	Majority coalition: PDI-P/Golkar/PPP/ Hanura/NasDem/PKB 337 / 560	60.36%	63.62%
Hanura	Partai Hati Nurani Rakyat	People's Conscience Party	Nominee: Joko Widodo (PDI-P); Running mate: Ma'ruf Amin (Independent)	Majority coalition: PDI-P/Golkar/PPP/ Hanura/NasDem/PKB 337 / 560	60.36%	63.62%
NasDem	Partai NasDem	NasDem Party	Nominee: Joko Widodo (PDI-P); Running mate: Ma'ruf Amin (Independent)	Majority coalition: PDI-P/Golkar/PPP/ Hanura/NasDem/PKB 337 / 560	60.36%	63.62%
PKB	Partai Kebangkitan Bangsa	National Awakening Party	Nominee: Joko Widodo (PDI-P); Running mate: Ma'ruf Amin (Independent)	Majority coalition: PDI-P/Golkar/PPP/ Hanura/NasDem/PKB 337 / 560	60.36%	63.62%
PBB	Partai Bulan Bintang	Crescent Star Party	Nominee: Joko Widodo (PDI-P); Running mate: Ma'ruf Amin (Independent)	Majority coalition: PDI-P/Golkar/PPP/ Hanura/NasDem/PKB 337 / 560	60.36%	63.62%
PKPI	Partai Keadilan dan Persatuan Indonesia	Indonesian Justice and Unity Party	Nominee: Joko Widodo (PDI-P); Running mate: Ma'ruf Amin (Independent)	Majority coalition: PDI-P/Golkar/PPP/ Hanura/NasDem/PKB 337 / 560	60.36%	63.62%
Perindo	Partai Persatuan Indonesia	Perindo Party	Nominee: Joko Widodo (PDI-P); Running mate: Ma'ruf Amin (Independent)	Majority coalition: PDI-P/Golkar/PPP/ Hanura/NasDem/PKB 337 / 560	60.36%	63.62%
PSI	Partai Solidaritas Indonesia	Indonesian Solidarity Party	Nominee: Joko Widodo (PDI-P); Running mate: Ma'ruf Amin (Independent)	Majority coalition: PDI-P/Golkar/PPP/ Hanura/NasDem/PKB 337 / 560	60.36%	63.62%
Gerindra	Partai Gerakan Indonesia Raya	Gerindra Party	Nominee: Prabowo Subianto (Gerindra); Running mate: Sandiaga Uno (Gerindra, later Independent)	Minority coalition: Gerindra/PKS/PAN/Demokrat 223 / 560	39.64%	36.38%
PKS	Partai Keadilan Sejahtera	Prosperous Justice Party	Nominee: Prabowo Subianto (Gerindra); Running mate: Sandiaga Uno (Gerindra, later Independent)	Minority coalition: Gerindra/PKS/PAN/Demokrat 223 / 560	39.64%	36.38%
PAN	Partai Amanat Nasional	National Mandate Party	Nominee: Prabowo Subianto (Gerindra); Running mate: Sandiaga Uno (Gerindra, later Independent)	Minority coalition: Gerindra/PKS/PAN/Demokrat 223 / 560	39.64%	36.38%
Demokrat	Partai Demokrat	Democratic Party (Note: Though part of Prabowo's coalition, the Democratic Party explicitly permits its members to endorse either pair of candidates.)	Nominee: Prabowo Subianto (Gerindra); Running mate: Sandiaga Uno (Gerindra, later Independent)	Minority coalition: Gerindra/PKS/PAN/Demokrat 223 / 560	39.64%	36.38%
Berkarya	Partai Berkarya	Berkarya Party	Nominee: Prabowo Subianto (Gerindra); Running mate: Sandiaga Uno (Gerindra, later Independent)	Minority coalition: Gerindra/PKS/PAN/Demokrat 223 / 560	39.64%	36.38%

==== Nominees ====
1
2019 Onward Indonesia Coalition ticket
Joko Widodo	Ma'ruf Amin
for President	for Vice President
7th President of Indonesia (2014–present); Governor of Jakarta (2012–2014)	Chairman of the Indonesian Ulema Council (2015–2020); General Leader of Nahdlatul Ulama (2015–2018)
Campaign

2
Just and Prosperous Indonesia Coalition ticket
Prabowo Subianto	Sandiaga Uno
for President	for Vice President
Commander of Army Strategic Reserve Command (1998); 2014 presidential nominee	Vice Governor of Jakarta (2017–2018)
Campaign

==== Potential candidates ====
Other individuals who expressed an intent, received political support, or were touted as prospective presidential candidates included son of former president Yudhoyono and 2017 Jakarta gubernatorial candidate Agus Harimurti Yudhoyono, former MPR Speaker Amien Rais, Governor of Jakarta and former minister of education and culture Anies Baswedan, all of whom subsequently endorsed Prabowo, and incumbent Vice President of Indonesia Jusuf Kalla, who later expressed support for Jokowi.

=== Campaigns ===
The official campaigning period lasted around six months, starting with a "peaceful campaign" declaration on 23 September 2018, and the final day on 13 April 2019. Before the start of the campaign, both parties submitted their campaign teams to the KPU; Jokowi's being led by businessman Erick Thohir while Prabowo's was led by former Indonesian National Armed Forces commander Djoko Santoso.

==== Debates ====
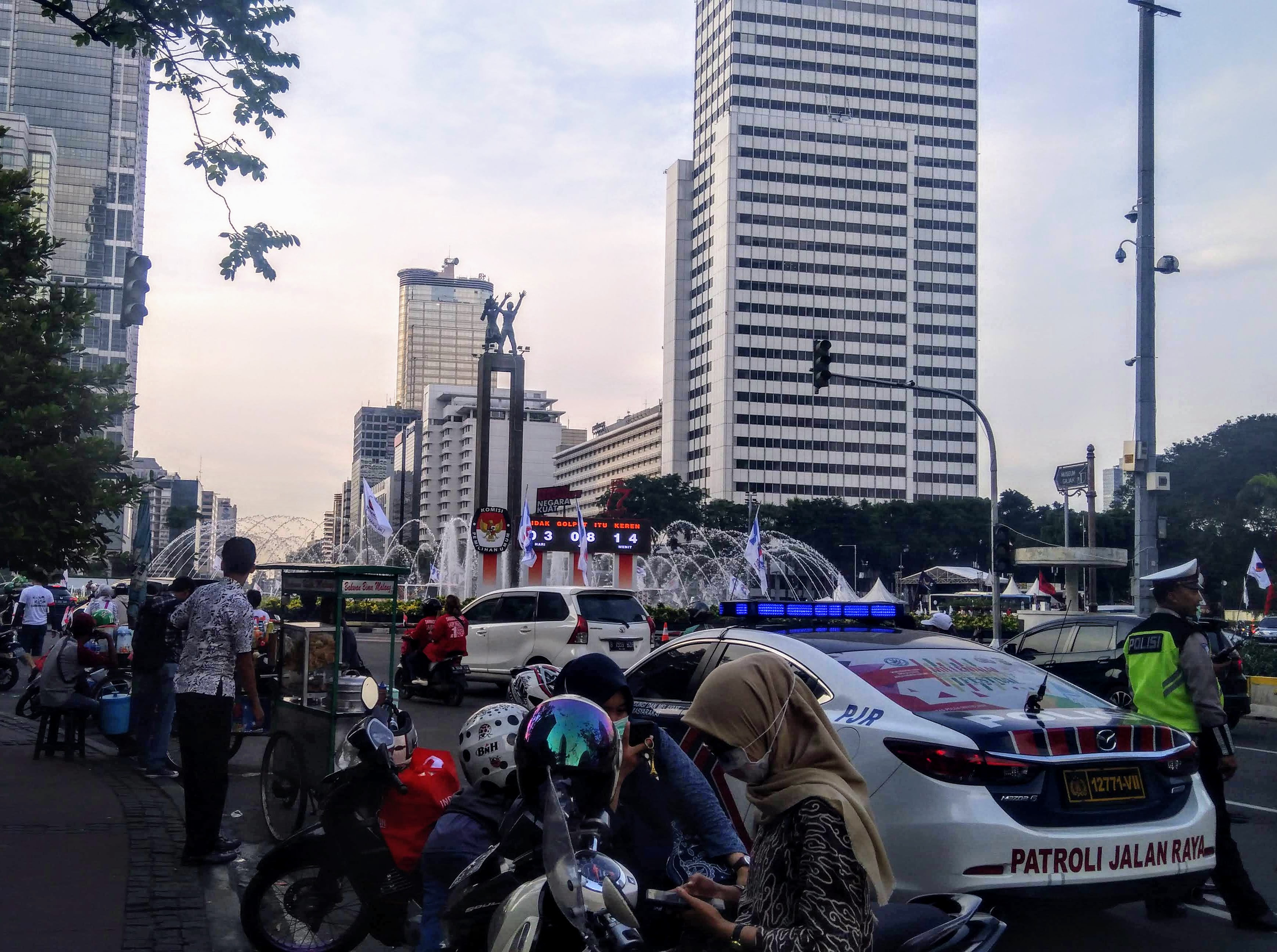
Election countdown at Selamat Datang Monument.

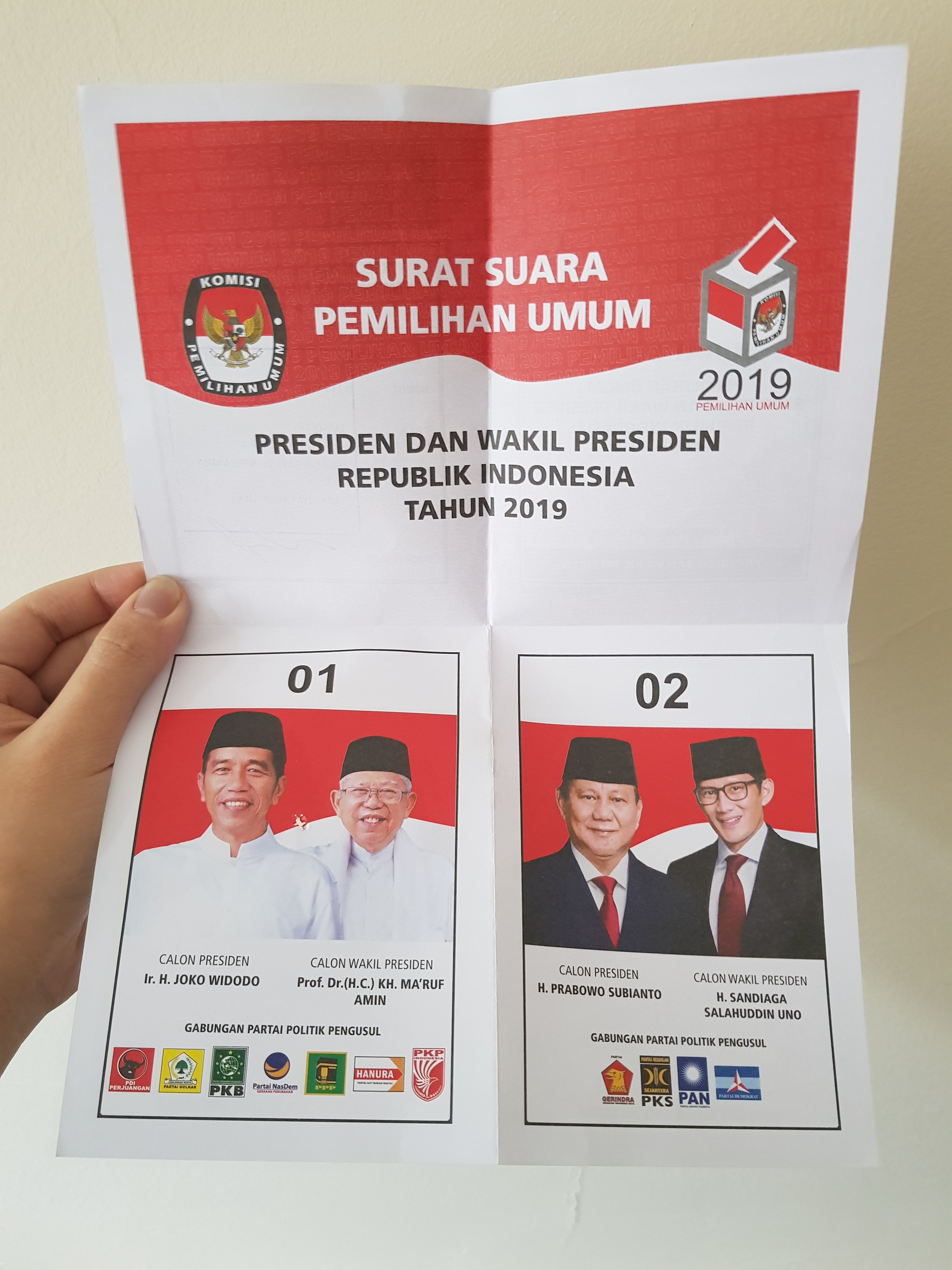
Presidential voting ballot sent by mail for Indonesian diaspora. The ballot is punched at section 01, in favour of Joko Widodo.

The KPU scheduled five debates to be held in 2019, the same number as in 2014. DPR member and PAN Central Committee chairman Yandri Susanto proposed that the debates be held in English, but the KPU decided that the debates would be held in Indonesian. The debate questions from the KPU were provided in advance to the candidates. The Prabowo campaign team criticised it as belittling the candidates.

The first debate held on 17 January 2019, focused on legal, human rights, terrorism and corruption issues, and was moderated by Ira Koesno and Imam Priyono. Both candidates described their visions during the early stages. Jokowi admitted the difficulty of solving old human rights cases and promising to strengthen law enforcement institutions. Prabowo shared this sentiment and called for an increase in the salaries of civil servants to reduce corruption.

The second debate was held on 17 February 2019, with topics covering energy, food, infrastructure, natural resources and the environment, and was moderated by news presenters Anisha Dasuki and Tommy Tjokro. This time, both candidates utilised more numbers and statistics. In one segment, Jokowi questioned Prabowo on his stance about unicorn companies, briefly confusing Prabowo and led to internet memes related to the animal unicorn. On the topic of agrarian land reform, Jokowi pointed out Prabowo's ownership of 340,000 hectares (840,000 acres) of land. Prabowo stated that he held the land under cultivation rights instead of full ownership and was willing to return it to the state.

The third debate, involving the vice-presidential candidates, covered education, health, labour, social affairs and culture, and was held on 17 March 2019. On 30 March 2019, the fourth debate was held, which was centred around defence and foreign policy. The fifth and final debate was held on 13 April 2019 and focused on economics, public welfare, industry, trade and investment.

==== Social media ====
With millennials making up around two-fifths of Indonesia's population, there were significant efforts by both sides to appeal to the age group. One example of a major social media-centred campaign, dubbed #2019GantiPresiden emerged, initiated by PKS politician Mardani Ali Sera. It included holding rallies in multiple cities until they were disallowed following clashes with Jokowi supporters.

Before the campaign period began, observers had expected rampant hoaxes and fake news coming through social media and WhatsApp. One observer noted that the government was limited in its impact in handling the issue, as it may be framed as favouring the incumbent. One particular case involved activist and Prabowo campaigner Ratna Sarumpaet. She falsely claimed to have been assaulted, initially causing many prominent opposition politicians to voice support. However, she admitted that she had lied following a police investigation. She was prosecuted as a result and forced to resign from the campaign team, and Prabowo personally apologised for spreading the hoax. Both sides formed dedicated anti-hoax groups to counterattacks on social media, with the Indonesian government holding weekly fake news briefings.

Amid public apathy toward mainstream parties and candidates, a pairing of spoof candidates, "Nurhadi-Aldo" (abbreviated as dildo), gained popularity on social media, with 400,000 Instagram followers within the first month of its creation. The account parodied typical political aesthetics and utilised vulgar acronyms.

==== Finances ====
On 23 September, both campaign teams submitted an initial budget. Jokowi's campaign team reported an initial balance of Rp 11.9 billion and Prabowo's team Rp 2 billion. Indonesia Corruption Watch observers deemed the initial numbers "unrealistic" (Jokowi's team spent Rp 293 billion in 2014, while Prabowo's spent Rp 166 billion). Representatives from both teams responded that the balance was just an initial balance, and would increase throughout the campaigning period.

For the Prabowo Subianto campaign, in particular, Uno paid for the majority of campaign fees, with his contribution comprising 70% of the reported campaign funds (Rp 95.4 billion out of Rp 135 billion). Uno stated in an interview with Bloomberg that he spent around US$100 million on the election.

=== Polls ===
By late 2018, Jokowi was ahead of Prabowo in most surveys. The table below gives detailed survey results from a variety of organizations.

Polls conducted after nominations

Polling organization	Date	Sample size	Jokowi	Prabowo
Charta Politika	5–10 April 2019	2,000	55.7	38.8
SMRC	5–8 April 2019	2,285	56.8	37.0
LSI	18–26 March 2019	1,200	60	40
SMRC	24 February-5 March 2019	2,479	57.6	31.8
Kompas	22 February-5 March 2019	2,000	49.2	37.4
LSI	18–25 January 2019	1,200	54.8	31.0
Median	6–15 January 2019	1,500	47.9	38.7
Charta Politika	22 December 2018 – 2 January 2019	2,000	53.2	34.1
LSI	10–19 November 2018	1,200	53.2	31.2
Median	4–16 November 2018	1,200	47.7	35.5
Kompas	24 September-5 October 2018	1,200	52.6	32.7
SMRC	7–24 September 2018	1,074	60.4	29.8
Indikator	1–6 September 2018	1,220	57.7	32.3
Y-Publica	13–23 August 2018	1,200	52.7	28.6
LSI	12–19 August 2018	1,200	52.2	29.5
Alvara	12–18 August 2018	1,500	53.5	35.2

NOTE: See warning above

Polls conducted before nominations

Polling organization	Date	Sample size	Jokowi	Prabowo	JK	Nurmantyo	AHY	Anies	Ahok	Tanoesoedibjo	Hasan	Muhaimin
RTK	23 July-1 Aug 2018	1,610	42.5	21.3	0.4	1.6	3.1	0.8	–	0.4	0.2	1.8
Median	19 April-5 May 2018	2,100	35.70	22.60	–	6.80	–	5.20	–	–	–	–
Median (head to head)	19 April-5 May 2018	2,100	58.20	26.60	–	–	–	–	–	–	–	–
Polcomm	3–6 May 2018	1,200	36.42	27.17	–	4.92	–	4.33	–	–	3.5	2.5
IDM (head to head)	28 Apr – 8 May 2018	2,450	29.8	50.1	–	–	–	–	–	–	–	–
IDM	28 Apr – 8 May 2018	2,450	26.4	40.1	–	8.2	6.3	–	–	–	–	–
RTK	21 Apr – 21 May 2018	1,610	38.5	20.5	–	1.6	2.7	–	–	0.9	–	–
Indo Barometer	15–22 Apr 2018	2,000	40.7	19.7	1.2	2.7	2.0	2.4	0.9	1.0	0.3	0.5
Charta Politika	13–19 Apr 2018	2,000	51.2	23.3	2.0	5.5	2.7	3.4	–	–	–	0.6
INES	12 – 28 April 2018	2,180	27.7	50.2	–	7.4	–	–	–	–	–	–
Cyrus	27 March-3 April 2018	1,230	56.7	19.8	1.6	3.2	2.1	1.6	–	2.2	–	–
Median	24 March-6 April 2018	1,200	36.2	20.4	4.3	7.0	1.8	2.0	–	1.6	–	–
Kompas	21 March-1 April 2018	1,200	55.9	14.1	–	1.8	–	–	–	–	–	–
KedaiKOPI	19–27 March 2018	1,135	48.3	21.5	–	2.1	1.1	1.1	–	0.5	–	–
Populi Center	7–16 February 2018	1,200	64.3	25.3	–	–	–	–	–	–	–	–
Median	1–9 February 2018	1,000	35.0	21.2	–	5.5	3.3	4.5	–	–	–	–
Poltracking	27 January-3 February 2018	1,200	45.4	19.8	0.5	0.3	0.8	0.6	–	0.3	–	–
Indo Barometer	23–30 January 2018	1,200	32.7	19.1	2.1	2.7	2.5	2.5	2.9	0.8	–	–
SMRC	7–13 December 2017	1,220	38.9	10.5	0.9	1.2	–	1.7	–	1.3	–	–
PolMark	13–25 November 2017	2,600	50.2	22.0	0.7	2.0	4.8	4.5	–	1.6	–	–
Indo Barometer	15–23 November 2017	1,200	34.9	12.1	–	3.2	2.5	3.6	3.3	–	–	–
Poltracking	8–15 November 2017	2,400	41.5	18.2	0.9	0.8	0.8	0.5	–	–	–	–
Populi Center	19–26 October 2017	1,200	49.4	21.7	0.4	2.0	–	0.7	–	0.7	–	–
PolMark	22 October 2017	2,250	41.2	21	–	–	2.9	–	–	–	–	–
Median	2 October 2017	1,000	36.2	23.2	2.6	2.8	–	4.4	–	–	–	–
Indikator	17–24 September 2017	1,220	34.2	11.5	–	0.7	0.5	0.5	0.5	1	–	–
SMRC	3–10 September 2017	1,220	38.9	12	0.8	0.3	0.3	0.9	0.8	0.6	–	–
SMRC	14–20 May 2017	1,500	53.7	37.2	–	–	–	–	–	–	–	–
SMRC	14–20 May 2017	1,500	34.1	17.2	0.4	0.3	0.4	0.4	0.9	1.1	–	–
Kompas	April 2017		41.6	22.1	–	–	–	–	–	–	–	–

NOTE: See warning above

== Legislative election ==
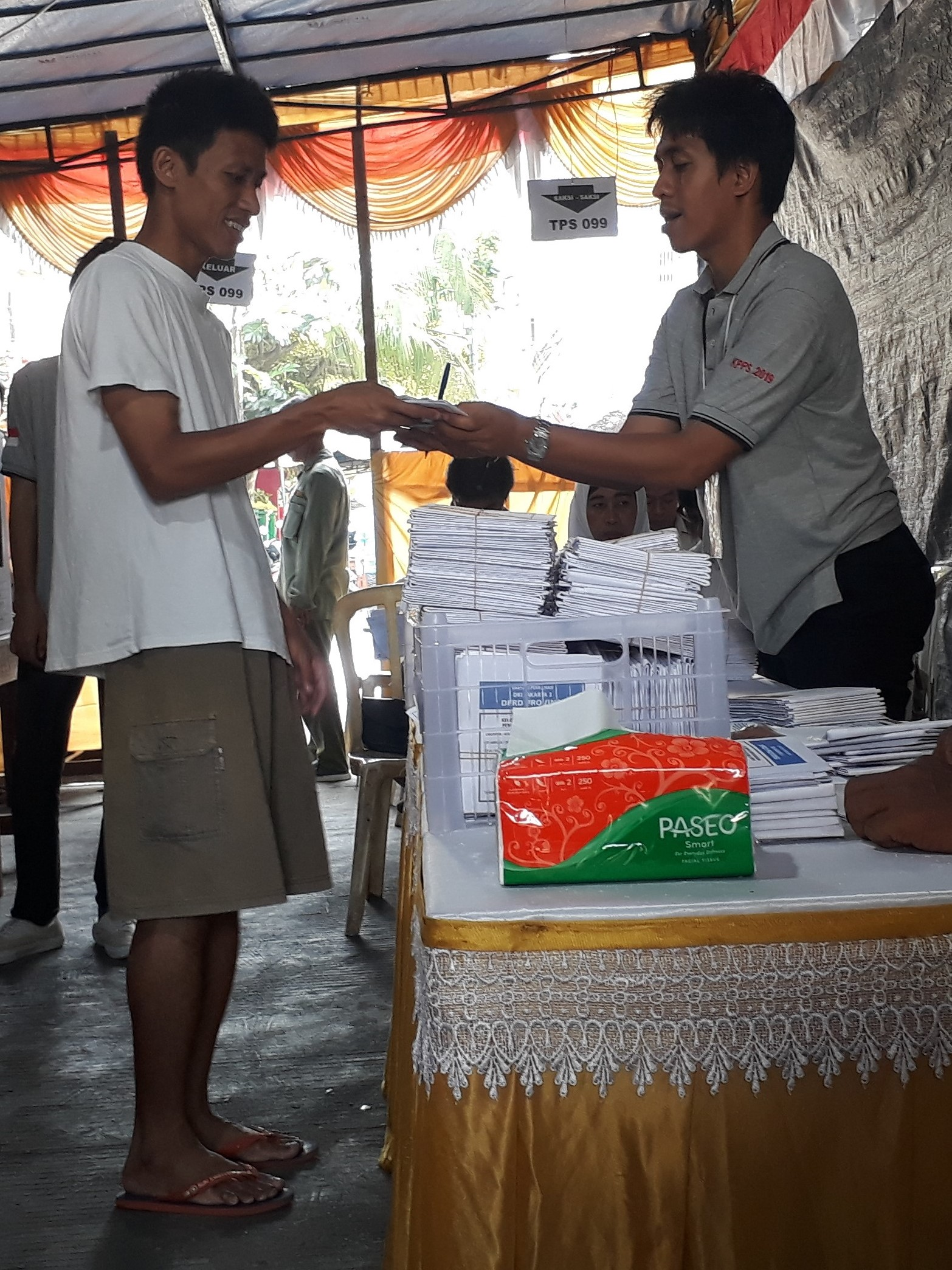
Voters receiving ballots for the election.

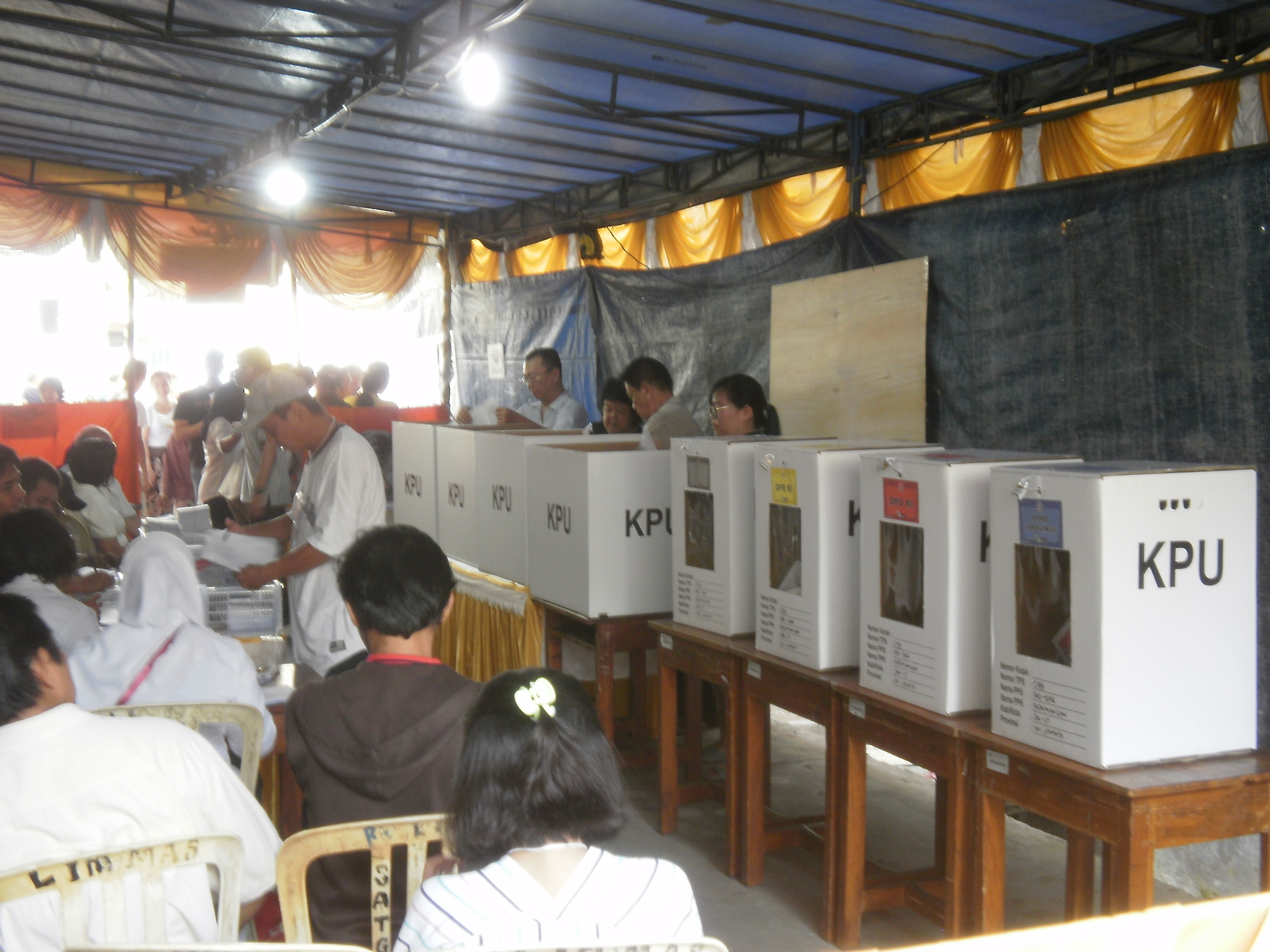
Voters casting their choice for the election. Voters had wait for several minutes for their name to be called before voting.

=== Contested seats ===
Legislative elections in Indonesia: April 2019
Level	Institution	Seats contested	Change from 2014
National	People's Representative Council; Dewan Perwakilan Rakyat (DPR)	575	▲15
National	Regional Representative Council; Dewan Perwakilan Daerah (DPD)	136	▲4 (Note: Due to the formation of North Kalimantan, which was previously unrepresented)
Provincial; Provinsi	Provincial People's Regional Representative Council; Dewan Perwakilan Rakyat Daerah Provinsi (DPRD I)	2,207	▲95
Regency/Municipal; Kabupaten/Kota	Regency/Municipal People's Regional Representative Council; Dewan Perwakilian Rakyat Daerah Kabupaten/Kota (DPRD II)	17,340	▲445
Total		20,258	▲829

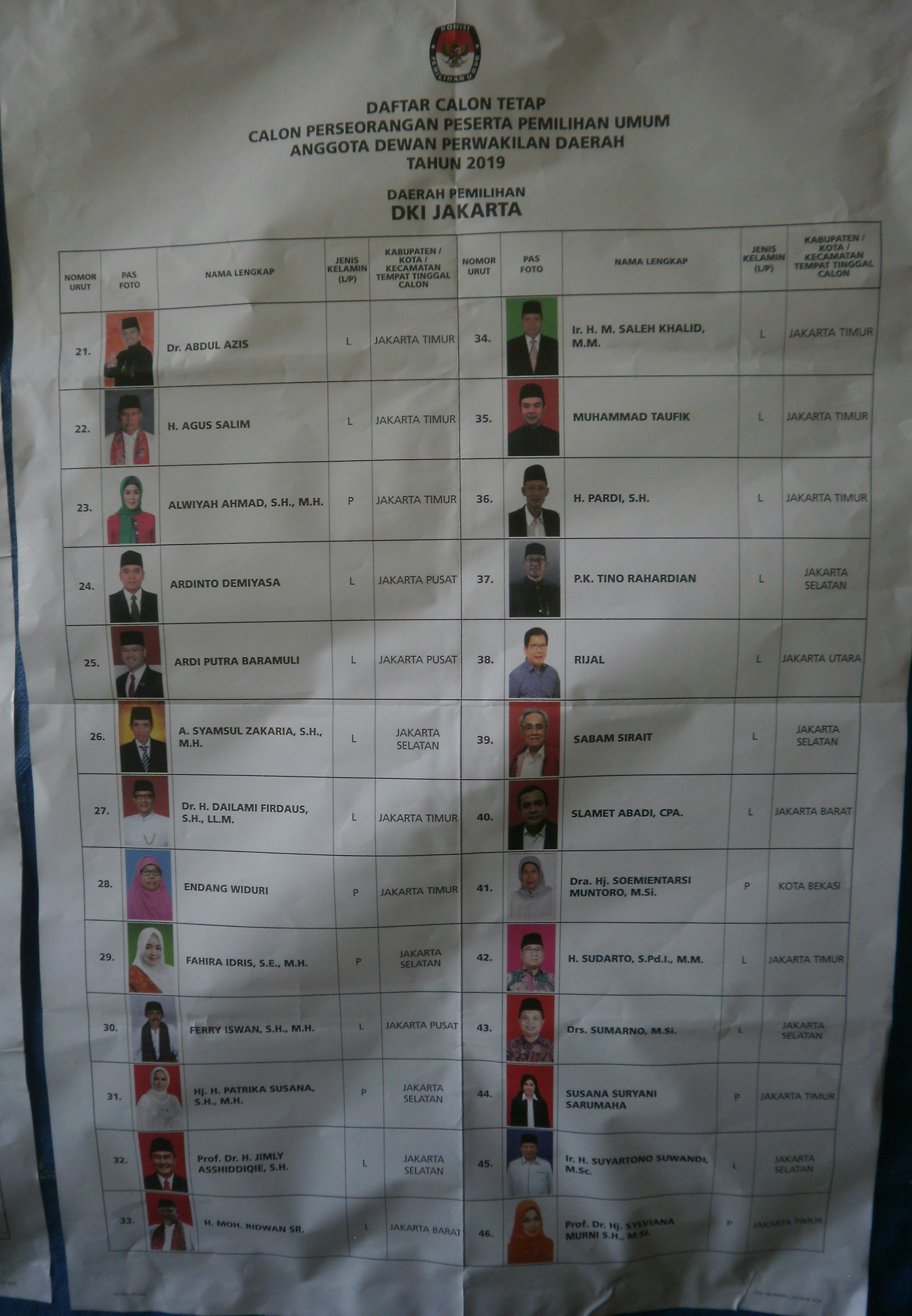
A list of candidates for the DPD, from the Special Region of Jakarta constituency.

=== Candidates ===
All legislative candidates had to be Indonesian citizens, over 21 years old, senior high school (or equivalent) graduates, and have never been convicted for a crime resulting in a sentence of 5 years or more. In addition, the candidates for the People's Representative Council (DPR) or local legislatures had to be endorsed by a political party and were required to resign from their non-legislative government offices – except for the president and vice president – or their state-owned company positions. Legislators running for reelection or another body through a new political party were also required to resign.

For the DPR, there were 7,968 candidates – 4,774 male and 3,194 female – contesting the 575 seats for an average of 13.86 candidates per seat available. Just three parties – NasDem, PAN and PKB – used their entire quota of 575 candidates, with the PKPI registering only 137 candidates. Formappi, an NGO, found that 529 out of 560 (94%) incumbent DPR members were running for reelection.

The election for DPD members required candidates to be a non-partisan, with a total of 807 candidates competing for the 136 seats. The incumbent speaker, Oesman Sapta Odang, was briefly removed from the candidacy list for not resigning from Hanura, though he was restored when he submitted a resignation letter. Although all provinces were allocated four seats, the number of candidates varied from 10 for West Papua to 49 for West Java. Approximately 245,000 candidates were running for all legislative seats across the country. For example, 1,586 candidates were approved to run for the 120-seat West Java Provincial Council alone.

Details for DPR candidate numbers

Ballot No.	Party		Districts	Candidates	Male	Female
1	National Awakening Party	PKB	80	575	355	220
2	Gerindra Party	Gerindra	79	569	360	209
3	Indonesian Democratic Party of Struggle	PDIP	80	573	358	215
4	Party of the Functional Groups	Golkar	80	574	357	217
5	National Democratic Party	NasDem	80	575	354	221
6	Garuda Party	Garuda	80	225	115	110
7	Berkarya Party	Berkarya	80	554	341	213
8	Prosperous Justice Party	PKS	80	533	321	212
9	Indonesian Unity Party	Perindo	80	568	347	221
10	United Development Party	PPP	80	554	321	233
11	Indonesian Solidarity Party	PSI	80	574	300	274
12	National Mandate Party	PAN	80	575	356	219
13	People's Conscience Party	Hanura	79	427	250	177
14	Democratic Party	Demokrat	80	573	350	223
19	Crescent Star Party	PBB	80	382	228	154
20	Indonesian Justice and Unity Party	PKPI	61	137	61	76

=== Finances ===
The political parties, like the presidential candidates, were required to submit their campaign budgets to the KPU. Aside from donations from sympathizers and members, the parties which participated in the 2014 election also receive money from the government amounting to Rp 1,000 (US$0.071) per vote received. By January 2019, the national political parties have collectively reported campaign donations totalling Rp 445 billion (US$31.6 million).

=== Polls ===
NOTE: The accuracy of political surveys in Indonesia varies significantly, with some having little transparency. It should also be noted that some agencies also act as political consultants and surveys are often paid for by candidates. Caution should hence be exercised in using the polling data below.

Polls for the 2019 Indonesian legislative election

Pollster	Date	Sample size	PDI-P	Golkar	Gerindra	Demokrat	PKB	PKS	PAN	PPP	Hanura	NasDem	PBB	Perindo	PSI	Berkarya	Garuda	PKPI
Cyrus	27 March-2 April 2019	1,230	27.9	11.4	16.7	5.5	8.0	5.1	3.7	3.2	1.2	3.7	–	–	–	–	–	–
LSI	18–26 March 2019	1,200	24.6	11.8	13.4	5.9	5.8	3.9	3.1	2.9	0.9	2.5	0.2	3.9	0.2	0.7	0.1	0.1
Charta Politika	1–9 March 2019	2,000	24.8	9.8	15.7	5.1	7.2	4.1	3.2	3.6	0.8	4.9	0.4	1.3	1.4	0.4	0.2	0.3
Kompas	22 February-5 March 2019	2,000	26.9	9.4	17	4.6	6.8	4.5	2.9	2.7	0.9	2.6	0.4	1.5	0.9	0.5	0.2	0.2
LSI	18–25 January 2019	1,200	23.7	11.3	14.6	5.4	8.2	4	1.5	3.5	0.5	4.5	-	3.6	0.4	0.1	0.3	-
Charta Politika	22 December 2018 – 2 January 2019	2,000	25.2	9.0	15.2	4.5	8.1	4.2	2.6	4.3	0.6	5.3	0.4	2.7	-	-	-	0.1
Kompas	24 September-5 October 2018	1,200	29.90	6.20	16.00	4.80	6.30	3.30	2.30	3.20	1.00	3.60	0.40	1.50	0.40	0.40	0.30	0.10
Median	19 April–5 May 2018	1,200	26.00	8.80	16.50	8.60	8.70	3.00	3.40	2.80	0.70	2.70	0.20	3.50	0.30	0.20	–	0.20
Polcomm	3–6 May 2018	1,200	22.92	7.92	17.5	6.17	3.42	2.83	3.25	1.17	0.58	1.75	0.42	1.75	0.33	–	–	–
LSI	28 Apr–5 May 2018	1,200	21.7	15.3	14.7	5.8	6.2	2.2	2.5	1.8	0.7	2.3	0.4	2.3	0.1	0.1	0.3	0.1
Charta Politika	13–19 Apr 2018	2,000	24.9	11	12.3	5	7	3.5	2.8	3.8	0.6	3.6	0.7	4.0	0.2	–	0.2	–
Cyrus	27 Mar–3 Apr 2018	1,239	26.9	11.5	11.5	5.0	7.3	3.5	1.5	4.3	1.0	3.3	0.2	4.3	0.3	0.8	0.3	–
Indikator	25–31 Mar 2018	1,200	27.7	8.0	11.4	6.6	5.8	4.0	1.9	3.5	0.5	2.7	0.3	4.6	0.2	0.3	0.7	–
Median	24 Mar–6 Apr 2018	1,200	21.1	9.3	15	8.1	8.5	2.9	2	3.6	0.7	2.4	–	–	–	–	–	–
Kompas	21 Mar–1 Apr 2018	1,200	33.3	7.2	10.9	2.8	4.9	2.4	1.3	2.2	–	2.5	–	1.5	–	–	–	–
Poltracking	27 Jan–3 Feb 2018	1,200	26.5	11.3	13.4	6.6	6	4.6	3.6	2.7	2.3	3.3	0.5	2.1	2.1	–	–	–
LSI	7–14 Jan 2018	1,200	22.2	15.5	11.4	6.2	6	3.8	2	3.5	0.7	4.2	0.3	3	0.3	–	–	–
Indikator	17–24 Sep 2017	1,220	23.6	12	10.3	8	5.5	3.3	1.9	4.6	0.9	2	0.5	2.5	0.4	–	–	–
PolMark	9–20 Sep 2017	2,250	25.1	9.2	7.1	5.3	6.3	2.4	3.6	2.4	0.3	2.8	0.2	1.7	–	–	–	–
SMRC	3–10 Sep 2017	1,220	27.1	11.4	10.2	6.9	5.5	4.4	3.6	4.3	1.3	2.4	0.1	2	–	–	–	–

NOTE: See warning above

== Results ==
=== President ===
Swing between the 2014 and 2019 presidential elections by cities and regencies

The KPU officially announced that the Jokowi-Amin ticket had won the election in the early hours of 21 May 2019. The official vote tally was 85 million votes for Jokowi (55.50%) and 68 million votes for Prabowo (44.50%). The result was subject to appeals in the Constitutional Court; parties disputing the official tallies had 72 hours after the announcement to file an appeal.

Prior to the announcement of official results, 40 bodies were authorized by the KPU to release quick count results.

Candidate	Running mate	Party	Votes	%
Joko Widodo	Ma'ruf Amin	Indonesian Democratic Party of Struggle	85,607,362	55.50
Prabowo Subianto	Sandiaga Uno	Gerindra Party	68,650,239	44.50
Total			154,257,601	100.00
Valid votes			154,257,601	97.62
Invalid/blank votes			3,754,905	2.38
Total votes			158,012,506	100.00
Registered voters/turnout			192,770,611	81.97
Source: KPU

==== By province ====
Province						Total valid votes
Province		Joko Widodo PDI-P		Prabowo Subianto Gerindra		Total valid votes
Province		Votes	%	Votes	%	Total valid votes
Sumatra	Aceh	404,188	14.41	2,400,746	85.59	2,804,934
Sumatra	North Sumatra	3,936,515	52.32	3,587,786	47.68	7,524,301
Sumatra	West Sumatra	407,761	14.09	2,488,733	85.91	2,896,494
Sumatra	Riau	1,248,713	38.73	1,975,287	61.27	3,224,000
Sumatra	Jambi	859,833	41.68	1,203,025	58.32	2,062,858
Sumatra	South Sumatra	1,942,987	40.30	2,877,781	59.70	4,820,768
Sumatra	Bengkulu	583,488	49.89	585,999	50.11	1,169,487
Sumatra	Lampung	2,853,585	59.34	1,955,689	40.66	4,809,274
Sumatra	Bangka Belitung Islands	495,729	63.23	288,235	36.77	783,964
Sumatra	Riau Islands	550,692	54.19	465,511	45.81	1,016,203
Java	Banten	2,537,524	38.46	4,059,514	61.54	6,597,038
Java	Jakarta	3,279,547	51.68	3,066,137	48.32	6,345,684
Java	West Java	10,750,568	40.07	16,077,446	59.93	26,828,014
Java	Central Java	16,825,511	77.29	4,944,447	22.71	21,769,958
Java	Yogyakarta	1,655,174	69.03	742,481	30.97	2,397,655
Java	East Java	16,231,668	65.79	8,441,247	34.21	24,672,915
Kalimantan	West Kalimantan	1,709,896	57.50	1,263,757	42.50	2,973,653
Kalimantan	Central Kalimantan	830,948	60.74	537,138	39.26	1,368,086
Kalimantan	South Kalimantan	823,939	35.92	1,470,163	64.08	2,294,102
Kalimantan	East Kalimantan	1,094,845	55.71	870,443	44.29	1,965,288
Kalimantan	North Kalimantan	248,239	70.04	106,162	29.96	354,401
Lesser Sunda	Bali	2,351,057	91.68	213,415	8.32	2,564,472
Lesser Sunda	West Nusa Tenggara	951,242	32.11	2,011,319	67.89	2,962,561
Lesser Sunda	East Nusa Tenggara	2,368,982	88.57	305,587	11.43	2,674,569
Sulawesi	North Sulawesi	1,220,524	77.24	359,685	22.76	1,580,209
Sulawesi	Gorontalo	369,803	51.73	345,129	48.27	714,932
Sulawesi	Central Sulawesi	914,588	56.41	706,654	43.59	1,621,242
Sulawesi	Southeast Sulawesi	555,664	39.75	842,117	60.25	1,397,781
Sulawesi	West Sulawesi	475,312	64.32	263,620	35.68	738,932
Sulawesi	South Sulawesi	2,117,591	42.98	2,809,393	57.02	4,926,984
Maluku	Maluku	599,457	60.40	392,940	39.60	992,397
Maluku	North Maluku	310,548	47.39	344,823	52.61	655,371
Papua	Papua	3,021,713	90.66	311,352	9.34	3,333,065
Papua	West Papua	508,997	79.81	128,732	20.19	637,729
Overseas		570,534	73.31	207,746	26.69	778,280
Total		85,607,362	55.50	68,650,239	44.50	154,257,601
Source: Tempo

==== By region ====
Region					Total valid votes
Region	Joko Widodo PDI-P		Prabowo Subianto Gerindra		Total valid votes
Region	Votes	%	Votes	%	Total valid votes
Sumatra	13,283,491	42.70	17,828,792	57.30	31,112,283
Java	51,279,992	57.87	37,331,272	42.13	88,611,264
Kalimantan	4,707,867	52.57	4,247,663	47.43	8,955,530
Lesser Sunda	5,671,281	69.15	2,530,321	30.85	8,201,602
Sulawesi	5,653,482	51.49	5,326,598	48.51	10,980,080
Maluku	910,005	55.23	737,763	44.77	1,647,768
Papua	3,530,710	88.92	440,084	11.08	3,970,794
Overseas	570,534	73.31	207,746	26.69	778,280
Total	85,607,362	55.50	68,650,239	44.50	154,257,601
Source: Tempo

Jokowi won a majority of votes in 21 out of 34 provinces and the majority of overseas voters. An observer from Cornell University noted Jokowi's dominance in predominantly non-Muslim regions - such as the Hindu Bali and Christian North Sulawesi - despite losing support in heavily Muslim provinces such as Aceh and West Sumatra. Jokowi also performed well in ethnically Javanese regions - mainly in Central Java and East Java. Notably, Jokowi won 100% of votes in five Papuan regencies - Puncak, Puncak Jaya, Central Mamberamo, Yalimo, and Lanny Jaya - due to the noken (communal vote) system employed there. Prabowo, on the other hand, won in most of Sumatra's provinces, in addition to the provinces of Banten and West Java.

==== Rejection ====
Marines preparing for the 2019 Indonesian elections protests.

Prabowo's camp has declared that they would not accept the KPU's official results. On 14 May 2019, he held a press briefing where he alleged that vote-rigging had occurred, and claimed that his campaign team had collected evidence. The campaign team had also requested KPU stop their official vote tallying. Following the unofficial quick count results that indicated a Jokowi victory, Prabowo claimed his internal counts won him 62% of the votes and accused the pollsters of taking sides. One of the campaign team members, Fadli Zon, has indicated that the campaign team would not bring the case to the Constitutional Court (which rejected their appeal in 2014). After KPU's official announcement on 21 May, Prabowo stated that he rejected the presidential election results, and would resort to "constitutional legal pathways".

Protests by Prabowo supporters are expected on 22 May, when KPU is set to announce the results officially. In anticipation, the US and Singaporean embassies issued notices warning their citizens to avoid the protests. Following arrests of 29 people suspected of planning attacks on the rally, the Indonesian National Police urged for people not to attend the protests. Several opposition figures, such as Kivlan Zen, were investigated on suspicions of treason.

Following the protests, Prabowo's campaign team launched a Constitutional Court lawsuit, with the first hearing scheduled on 18 June 2019. They had previously submitted a complaint to the Bawaslu which was rejected on the grounds of insufficient evidence. According to Bawaslu, the complaint only included links to online news articles as evidence. On 27 June 2019, the Constitutional Court rejected in its entirety Prabowo team's legal challenge.

=== People's Representative Council ===
The official tally puts the PDI-P in the first place with 19.33%, followed by Prabowo's Gerindra with 12.57%. The next top parties by the number of votes are Golkar, PKB, the NasDem Party and PKS. 286 of the 575 elected legislators to the People's Representative Council were incumbents, with two-thirds aged between 41 and 60.

Party	Votes	%	+/–	Seats	+/–
Indonesian Democratic Party of Struggle	27,053,961	19.33	+0.38	128	+19
Gerindra Party	17,594,839	12.57	+0.76	78	+5
Golkar	17,229,789	12.31	–2.44	85	–6
National Awakening Party	13,570,097	9.69	+0.65	58	+11
NasDem Party	12,661,792	9.05	+2.33	59	+24
Prosperous Justice Party	11,493,663	8.21	+1.42	50	+10
Democratic Party	10,876,507	7.77	–2.42	54	–7
National Mandate Party	9,572,623	6.84	–0.75	44	–5
United Development Party	6,323,147	4.52	–2.01	19	–20
Perindo Party	3,738,320	2.67	New	0	New
Berkarya Party	2,929,495	2.09	New	0	New
Indonesian Solidarity Party	2,650,361	1.89	New	0	New
People's Conscience Party	2,161,507	1.54	–3.72	0	–16
Crescent Star Party	1,099,848	0.79	–0.67	0	0
Garuda Party	702,536	0.50	New	0	New
Indonesian Justice and Unity Party	312,775	0.22	–0.69	0	0
Total	139,971,260	100.00	–	575	+15
Valid votes	139,971,260	88.88			
Invalid/blank votes	17,503,953	11.12			
Total votes	157,475,213	100.00			
Registered voters/turnout	192,770,611	81.69			
Source: KPU, Jakarta Globe Medcom

==== By province ====
34 provinces with a range of 3 to 91 seats in each

Province	Total seats	Seats won								
Province	Total seats	PDI-P	Golkar	Gerindra	NasDem	PKB	Demokrat	PKS	PAN	PPP
Aceh	13	0	2	2	0	2	2	2	1	2
North Sumatra	30	7	4	4	4	1	3	4	3	0
West Sumatra	14	0	2	3	1	0	2	2	3	1
Riau	13	2	2	2	0	1	2	2	1	1
Jambi	8	1	2	1	1	1	1	0	1	0
South Sumatra	17	2	3	3	3	1	2	1	2	0
Bengkulu	4	1	1	1	0	0	0	0	1	0
Lampung	20	5	3	2	2	2	2	2	2	0
Bangka Belitung Islands	3	1	1	0	1	0	0	0	0	0
Riau Islands	4	1	1	0	1	0	0	0	1	0
Jakarta	21	7	1	3	1	0	2	5	2	0
West Java	91	13	14	17	5	8	10	13	8	3
Central Java	77	26	11	8	5	13	5	5	0	4
Yogyakarta	8	2	1	1	1	1	0	1	1	0
East Java	87	20	11	11	9	19	7	2	5	3
Banten	22	5	3	4	0	1	3	3	2	1
Bali	9	6	2	0	0	0	1	0	0	0
West Nusa Tenggara	11	1	1	2	1	1	1	2	1	1
East Nusa Tenggara	13	3	2	0	3	2	2	0	1	0
North Kalimantan	3	1	0	0	1	0	1	0	0	0
West Kalimantan	12	4	2	1	2	1	0	1	1	0
Central Kalimantan	6	2	1	1	1	0	1	0	0	0
South Kalimantan	11	3	2	2	0	1	0	1	1	1
East Kalimantan	8	2	2	1	1	0	1	1	0	0
North Sulawesi	6	3	1	0	2	0	0	0	0	0
Central Sulawesi	7	1	1	1	1	0	1	1	1	0
South Sulawesi	24	3	4	3	4	2	2	1	3	2
Southeast Sulawesi	6	1	1	1	1	0	1	0	1	0
Gorontalo	3	0	1	1	1	0	0	0	0	0
West Sulawesi	4	1	0	1	1	0	1	0	0	0
Maluku	4	1	0	1	1	0	0	1	0	0
North Maluku	3	1	1	0	1	0	0	0	0	0
Papua	10	1	1	1	3	1	1	0	2	0
West Papua	3	1	1	0	1	0	0	0	0	0
Total	575	128	85	78	59	58	54	50	44	19
Source: General Election Commission

==== Provincial legislatures ====
Provincial legislature (DPRD Provinsi) election results

Summary of the 17 April 2019 Indonesian Provincial People's Representative Council election results (number of seats won)
Province	PKB	Gerindra	PDIP	Golkar	NasDem	Garuda	Berkarya	PKS	Perindo	PPP	PSI	PAN	Hanura	Demokrat	PBB	PKPI	PA	PNA	PDA	SIRA	Total
Aceh	3	8	1	9	2	0	0	6	0	6	0	6	1	10	0	1	18	6	3	1	81
North Sumatra	2	15	19	15	12	0	0	11	1	2	0	8	6	9	0	0	0	0	0	0	100
West Sumatra	3	14	3	8	3	0	0	10	0	4	0	10	0	10	0	0	0	0	0	0	65
Riau	6	8	10	11	2	0	0	7	0	4	0	7	1	9	0	0	0	0	0	0	65
Jambi	5	7	9	7	2	0	1	5	0	3	0	7	2	7	0	0	0	0	0	0	55
Bengkulu	4	6	7	7	5	0	0	2	2	2	0	2	3	5	0	0	0	0	0	0	45
South Sumatra	8	10	11	13	6	0	0	6	3	1	0	5	3	9	0	0	0	0	0	0	75
Riau Islands	3	4	8	8	6	0	0	6	0	1	0	2	3	4	0	0	0	0	0	0	45
Bangka Belitung	0	6	10	7	5	0	0	4	0	6	0	1	0	5	1	0	0	0	0	0	45
Lampung	9	11	19	10	9	0	0	9	0	1	0	7	0	10	0	0	0	0	0	0	85
Banten	7	16	13	11	4	0	1	11	0	5	1	6	1	9	0	0	0	0	0	0	85
Jakarta	5	19	25	6	7	0	0	16	0	1	8	9	0	10	0	0	0	0	0	0	106
West Java	12	25	20	16	4	0	0	21	1	3	0	7	0	11	0	0	0	0	0	0	120
Central Java	20	13	42	12	3	0	0	10	0	9	0	6	0	5	0	0	0	0	0	0	120
Yogyakarta	6	7	17	5	3	0	0	7	0	1	1	7	0	1	0	0	0	0	0	0	55
East Java	25	15	27	13	9	0	0	4	0	5	0	6	1	14	1	0	0	0	0	0	120
Bali	0	6	33	8	2	0	0	0	0	0	1	0	1	4	0	0	0	0	0	0	55
NTB	6	9	4	10	5	0	2	7	0	7	0	5	1	7	2	0	0	0	0	0	65
NTT	7	6	10	10	9	0	0	0	6	1	1	6	5	4	0	0	0	0	0	0	65
West Kalimantan	5	7	15	8	8	0	0	3	1	3	0	5	2	7	0	1	0	0	0	0	65
Central Kalimantan	4	5	12	7	5	0	0	1	1	1	0	2	1	6	0	0	0	0	0	0	45
South Kalimantan	5	8	8	12	4	0	0	5	0	3	0	6	1	3	0	0	0	0	0	0	55
East Kalimantan	5	8	11	12	2	0	0	4	0	4	0	5	1	3	0	0	0	0	0	0	55
North Kalimantan	2	5	5	4	2	0	0	3	1	1	0	2	5	4	1	0	0	0	0	0	35
South Sulawesi	8	11	8	13	12	0	0	8	1	6	0	7	1	10	0	0	0	0	0	0	85
West Sulawesi	2	4	6	8	6	0	0	0	3	1	0	2	4	9	0	0	0	0	0	0	45
Southeast Sulawesi	3	4	5	7	5	0	0	4	0	2	0	8	1	5	1	0	0	0	0	0	45
Central Sulawesi	4	6	6	7	7	0	0	4	2	1	0	2	2	4	0	0	0	0	0	0	45
Gorontalo	1	4	7	10	6	0	0	4	0	5	0	3	2	3	0	0	0	0	0	0	45
North Sulawesi	1	2	18	7	8	0	0	1	0	0	1	2	0	5	0	0	0	0	0	0	45
North Maluku	1	5	8	8	4	1	2	2	2	0	0	4	2	4	2	0	0	0	0	0	45
Maluku	3	6	7	6	3	0	1	5	2	2	0	1	5	4	0	0	0	0	0	0	45
West Papua	2	3	7	8	7	0	0	2	2	0	0	3	3	6	0	2	0	0	0	0	45
Papua	3	5	7	6	8	1	3	3	1	1	0	6	3	8	0	0	0	0	0	0	55

==== Municipal legislatures ====
Municipal legislature (DPRD Kabupaten/Kota) election results

No.	Party	Member count		Distribution		Notes
No.	Party	Count	%	Provinces	Municipalities	Notes
1	PKB	1,553	8.97%	33	429	
2	Gerindra	1,970	11.42%	33	504	
3	PDIP	2,803	16.18%	33	494	
4	Golkar	2,412	13.89%	33	515	
5	NasDem	1,628	9.37%	33	484	
6	Garuda	33	0.19%	7	21	
7	Berkarya	131	0.75%	26	93	
8	PKS	1,229	7.05%	33	411	
9	Perindo	379	2.18%	31	229	
10	PPP	954	5.50%	33	357	
11	PSI	60	0.35%	15	43	
12	PAN	1,302	7.51%	32	433	
13	Hanura	746	4.30%	32	346	
14	Demokrat	1,584	9.13%	33	486	
15	PA	120	0.69%	1	22	Regional party
16	SIRA	4	0.02%	1	2	Regional party
17	PDA	17	0.10%	1	6	Regional party
18	PNA	46	0.27%	1	18	Regional party
19	PBB	214	1.23%	30	143	
20	PKPI	155	0.89%	24	100	

==== Quick count results ====
Unofficial quick count results for the 2019 Indonesian legislative election

Polling organization	PKB	Gerindra	PDI-P	Golkar	NasDem	Garuda	Berkarya	PKS	Perindo	PPP	PSI	PAN	Hanura	PD	PBB	PKPI	Data received	Source
Litbang Kompas	9.27	12.87	19.89	11.86	8.23	0.53	2.12	8.67	2.84	4.62	2.06	6.67	1.34	8.05	0.76	0.23	93.9%	
LSI	9.71	12.52	19.69	12.19	8.61	0.98	2.41	8.04	2.95	4.34	2.37	6.15	1.89	6.83	0.93	0.39	99.55%	
Indo Barometer	8.97	13.37	19.49	11.64	7.84	0.57	2.12	9.66	2.67	4.40	2.07	6.83	1.64	7.63	0.84	0.27	91.58%	
Indikator	10.05	12.88	19.11	11.88	9.00	0.50	2.06	8.42	2.66	4.46	1.99	6.55	1.63	7.64	0.93	0.25	88.71%	
Poltracking	10.42	12.71	19.21	12.64	8.50	0.62	2.17	7.83	2.78	4.48	1.82	6.32	1.64	7.69	0.86	0.31	N/A	
SMRC	9.57	12.59	19.42	12.14	8.95	0.63	2.19	8.12	2.80	4.48	1.94	6.65	1.71	7.55	0.87	0.31	N/A	

=== Turnout ===
The voter turnout for the election was a record, with around 81% of the registered voters participating in the presidential election. It was the highest turnout in Indonesian presidential electoral history, in contrast to the trend of an increasing number of abstentions between 2004 and 2014. Certain areas in Papua also allowed traditional voting procedures where a single village head represented entire communities, resulting in nominal 100% turnouts.

== Controversies ==
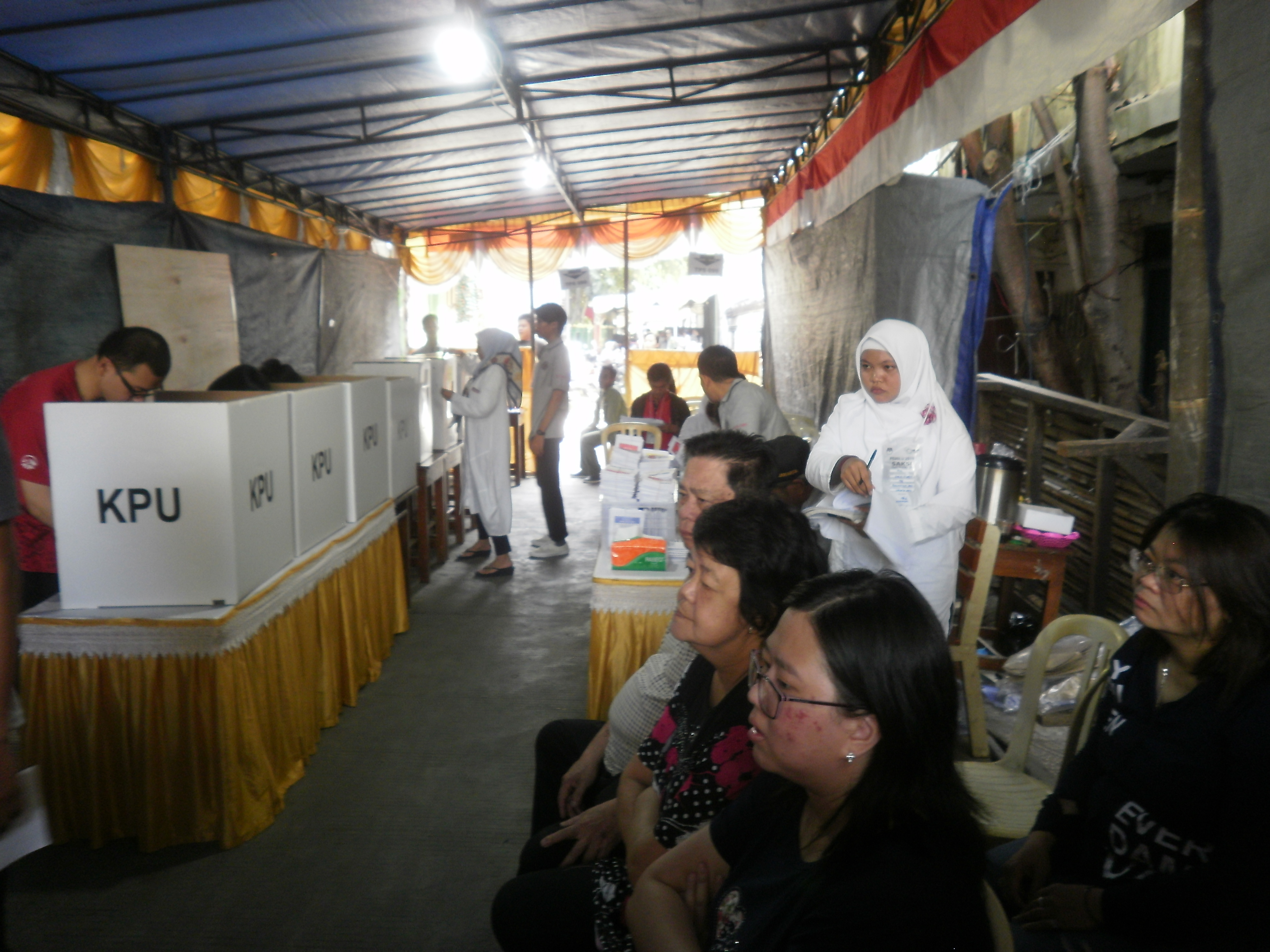
A woman (wearing white hijab) supervising the election process. The woman is a witness from PKS. Witnesses from other parties can be seen behind the woman.

Observers criticised the decision to hold the legislative and presidential elections simultaneously for being too complicated. Manual tabulation of votes at polling stations lasted until the day after the election itself. Exhaustion and fatigue caused by the long hours resulted in at least 225 election officers dying during the voting or in the ensuing vote counts, in addition to 1,470 falling ill. Vice President Jusuf Kalla has called for the 2024 election to return to the 2014 format of separated legislative and presidential votes. The 2024 election, under the existing regulations, would be a vote on all elected legislative and executive posts in the country. As of 9 May 2019, the KPU confirmed that 569 deaths had occurred due to overwork; this number includes 456 election officers, 91 supervisory agents and 22 police officers. Besides, 4,310 had reportedly fallen sick.

In July 2018, the KPU passed a regulation barring ex-corruption convicts, sexual offenders and people convicted of drug offences from running for office. However, the Bawaslu and the DPR objected to the regulation and accused the KPU of violating the 2017 election law. The Supreme Court of Indonesia eventually ruled that the KPU regulation was invalid, allowing convicts to contest in the election. Thirty-eight people who had been corruption convicts eventually ran for office across the country – 26 for regency/municipal councils and 12 for provincial councils.

The KPU was also criticised for giving legislative candidates an option not to publish their resumes. Formappi found that around a quarter of the candidates chose not to publish their information, with a further 18% not having submitted any. Some candidates noted that they wished to publish their information, but could not due to technical reasons with the KPU's website.

Ballot boxes for the election were made from waterproof cardboard intended for single-use. The KPU said it would save ballot box costs and allow construction of transparent boxes as mandated by election regulations. Although all parties in DPR approved the decision, Prabowo's campaign team contested it. Uno remarked that there was a potential for cheating. PDI-P Secretary General Hasto Kristiyanto remarked that "Gerindra was making up reasons for losing". The KPU later held public demonstrations where a ballot box was sprayed with water and sat on to demonstrate its strength, although KPU officials from various region had reported receiving 70 ballot boxes with water damage, and even the cardboard ballot boxes eaten by termites.

In January 2019, it was rumoured by Yusril Ihza Mahendra that Jokowi was considering releasing Islamist Abu Bakar Ba'asyir due to old age and declining health. The move was seen as controversial in Indonesia as part of a growing number of actions taken by Jokowi to appease Indonesia's conservative Muslims ahead of the election. The government later suspended this attempt as Ba'asyir refused to accept Pancasila as his ideology. He instead stuck to his fundamentalist Islam point of view.

Throughout his campaign, Prabowo was accused of spreading pessimism and using Donald Trump's 2016 campaign strategy of highlighting economic disparity. In one speech in October 2018, Prabowo stated he wanted to "Make Indonesia Great Again", much like Trump's 2016 campaign slogan. He also accused journalists of "manipulating" the attendance of the 212 "Mujahideen" Grand Reunion on 2 December 2018. Prabowo is known to have close relations with fundamentalist Muslims, with Muhammad Rizieq Shihab of the Islamic Defenders Front being one prominent example. Rizieq, who was on a self-imposed exile in Mecca, persistently campaigned against Jokowi and for Prabowo. Prabowo also promised to bring Rizieq home should he be elected.

== Budget ==
A budget of Rp 24.9 trillion (US$1.8 billion) was allocated for the election – 3% higher than the budget used in the 2014 election. This included spending on "safeguarding the election from hijacking". The KPU estimated a Rp 16.8 trillion funding requirement in December 2017, later revising it to Rp 15 trillion for a one-stage election, and ended up submitting a funding request of Rp 18.1 trillion, on top of the Rp 8.6 trillion requested by Bawaslu, in September 2018. Officers at the polling stations are paid Rp 500,000 (roughly US$35) each.

== Gallery ==
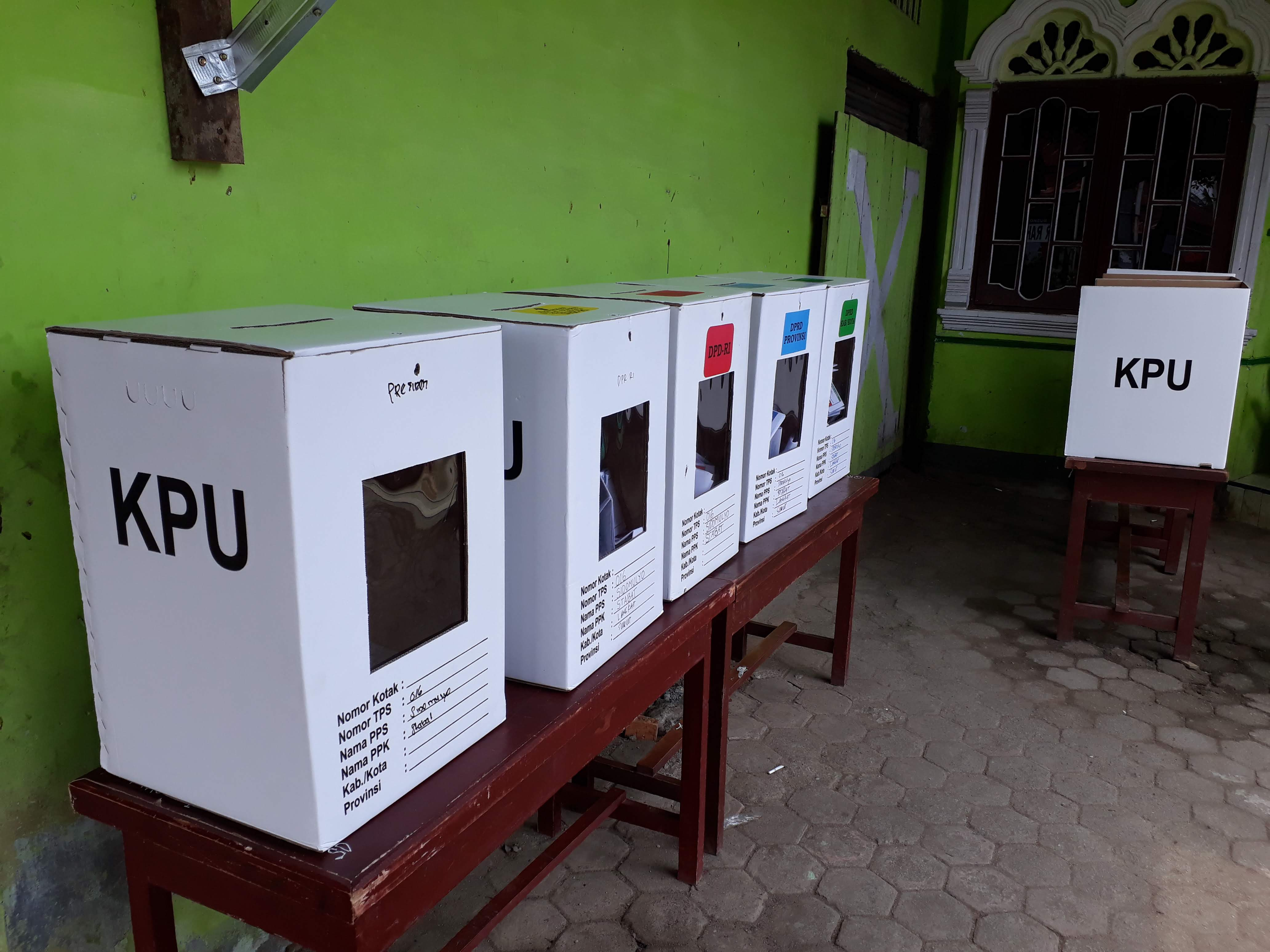
Ballot boxes

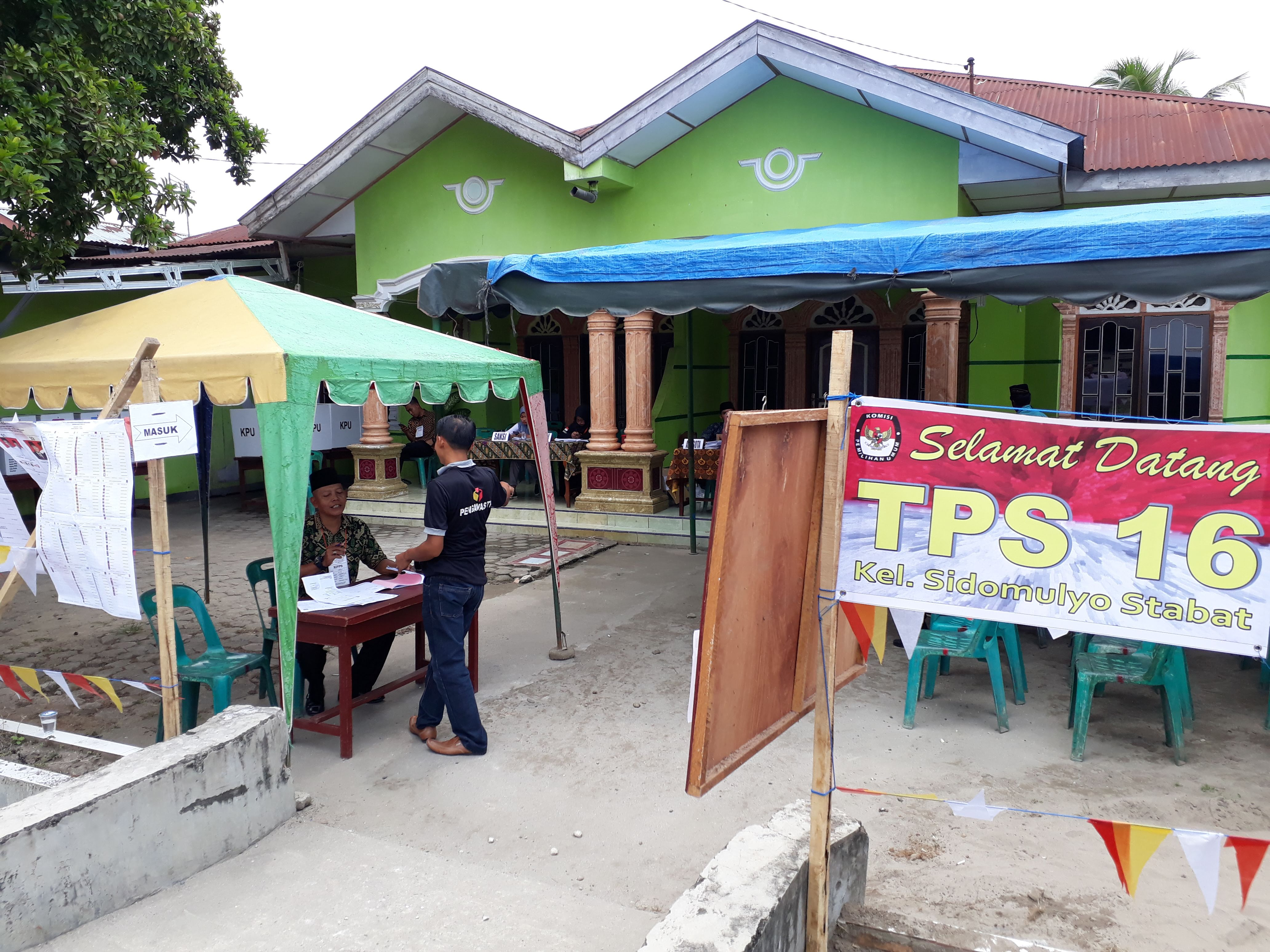
A polling station in Langkat Regency, North Sumatra

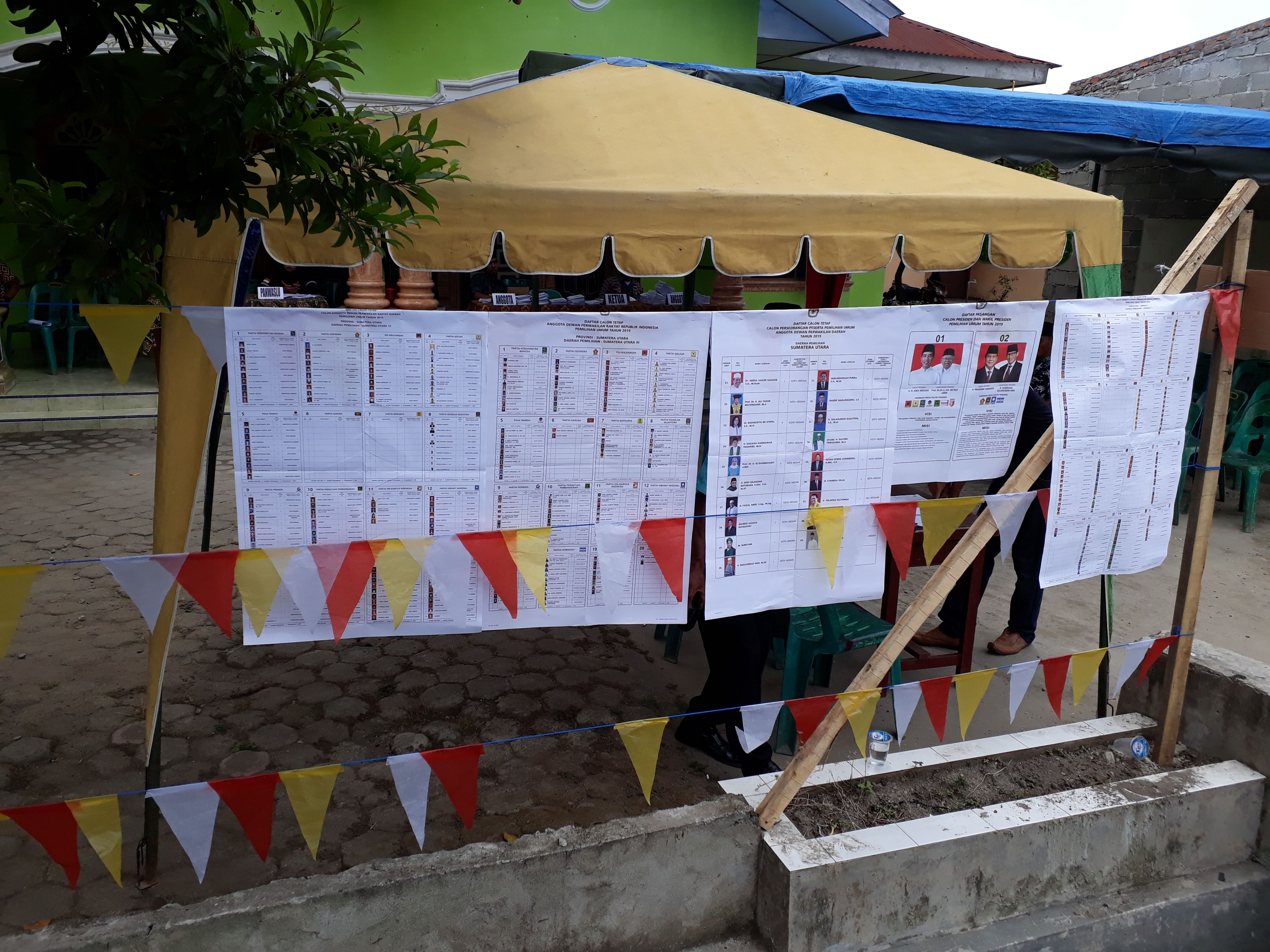
List of presidential and legislative candidates displayed outside a polling station

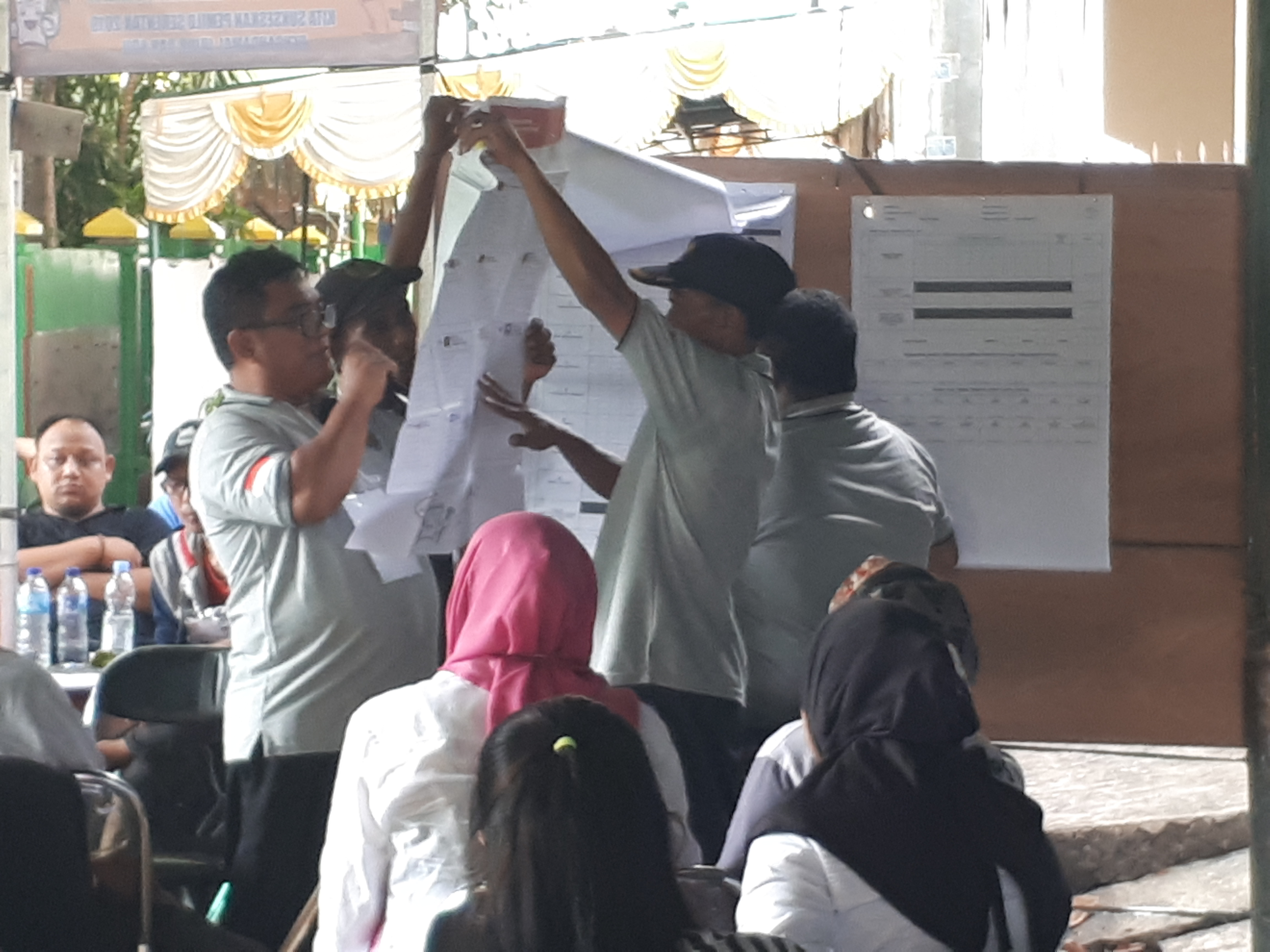
Officials of the KPU and representatives of various organizations and parties witness the vote count at Polling Station 100 in North Jakarta.
