= 2019GantiPresiden =

Political movement in Indonesia

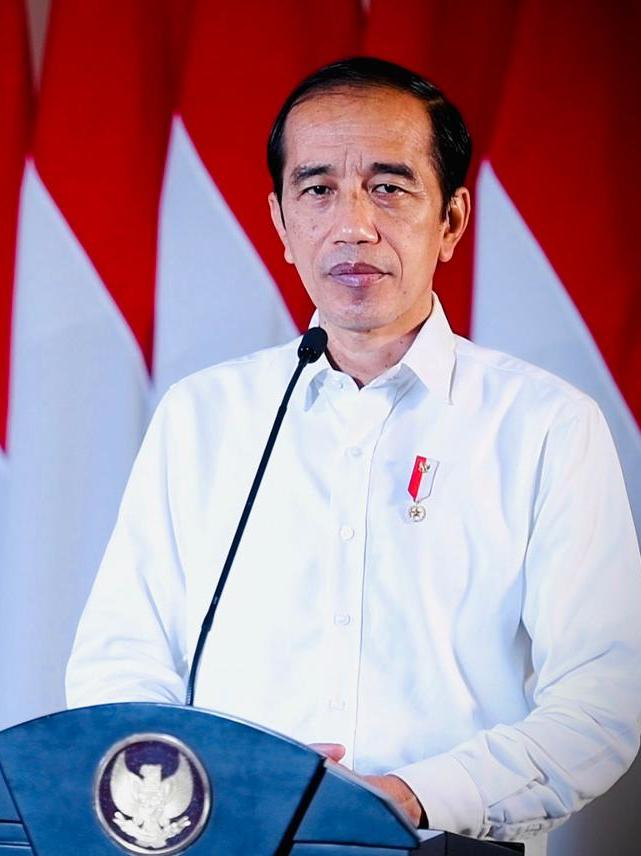
President Joko Widodo, whom the hashtag is referring to

#2019GantiPresiden was a Twitter hashtag and social media campaign in which Indonesian users shared their disapproval towards the Joko Widodo presidency. The main purpose of this campaign was a constitutional effort to replace the current president in the 2019 general election. The hashtag went viral after it was used by Prosperous Justice Party (PKS) politician Mardani Ali Sera on Twitter. In English, the term "Ganti Presiden" literally translates to "Replace the President."

== Background ==
The #2019GantiPresiden was introduced by Mardani Ali Sera in April 2018, a politician from the Prosperous Justice Party (PKS) which was at the time the opposition party to the Joko Widodo's government. He began spreading the hashtag throughout his social media, with the aim of providing political education to the public, and to elect a new president in the upcoming 2019 general election. Mardani's statement was reinforced by the statement of the PKS president, Sohibul Iman. Previously, a movement with the same name was also launched by Mardani on his personal Twitter account on March 27, 2018. According to Mardani in a tweet, the hashtag was the antithesis of Joko Widodo's campaign of supporters on social media.

Many social media accounts began to retweet the hashtag. Within a short period of time, T-shirts were produced with the hashtag, with Mardani denying that the movement is a political campaign due to a lack of a supported replacement. The movement garnered significant support from other opposition politicians, including Amien Rais (PAN) and Yusril Ihza Mahendra (PBB). Reasons cited include pressure on Islamic organizations, influx of immigrant workers (mainly from China) due to relaxation of immigration rules and economic issues such as a lack of available jobs and increased prices of necessities.

== Impact ==
#2019ChangePresident inspired several parties to create related attributes such as T-shirts and bracelets. There was a #2019GantiPresiden t-shirt seller at the Great Indonesia Movement Party National Working Meeting for Law and Advocacy at the Sultan Hotel, Jakarta. Some merchants also serve the order of the T-shirt by order, due to the sensitivity of the topic. However, several other merchants held their wares at online stores such as Bukalapak, Tokopedia, Shopee, and Lazada.

Some social media users also posted the pictures with the hashtag while visiting several cities overseas. In a speech, Joko Widodo mocked that the hashtag and T-shirt cannot change a president. PDI-P secretary-general Hasto Kristiyanto accused the movement of being a political move by the opposition and not an organic movement. In the 2018 West Java gubernatorial election, the hashtag was prominently used by the Sudrajat/Ahmad Syaikhu in their campaign to gain potential voters and significantly increased his electoral vote from 5-9 percent in survey polls to 27-30 percent in real count results, although the pair ultimately lost.

== Rallies ==
Some declarations and rallies supporting the campaign were made in several cities, such as Jakarta, Yogyakarta, and Surakarta. Supporters also tried to organize rallies in Serang, but was denied permission from the municipal government. In addition, the West Java branch of the Indonesian Ulema Council decried the movement, calling them "provocateurs".

== Response ==
=== Politicians ===
In response to the hashtag, president Joko Widodo responded by joking, "How can a t-shirt change the President? It's the people who can replace the President; if the people want it, they can change it. Both are blessings from God. If you change the shirt, you can change the President." His response was supported by Sohibul Iman, while a similar response was made by Indonesian Democratic Party of Struggle (PDI-P) politician Eva Kusuma Sundari, who called the hashtag phenomenon "sad" since the general election campaign had not even started yet, and who highlighted the increasingly intense efforts of the opposition party to criticize Joko Widodo. Golkar Party politician Ace Hasan Syadzily responded to the proliferation of t-shirts by saying that their circulation was an attempt to discredit the president, and that the performance of the president's government was considered by the people to have been very satisfactory, according to a survey.

The secretary of the NasDem party, Syarif Alkadrie, said the hashtag was used by people who were frustrated with Joko Widodo's government, while Coordinating Minister for Maritime Affairs Luhut Binsar Pandjaitan said that #2019ChangePresident was only the wish of a few parties who wanted to replace Joko Widodo, and that it was natural for Joko Widodo to respond to the hashtag. Ruhut Sitompul doubted that the movement would actually replace Joko Widodo, citing the PKS' inability to eject Fahri Hamzah from his position as Deputy Speaker of the People's Consultative Assembly despite him having been fired in 2016. Secretary General of the PDI-P Hasto Kristiyanto similarly considered #2019GantiPresident to be a political maneuver, not an aspiration, and said that the opposition couldn't do anything while Joko Widodo's electability was high.

=== Election officials ===
In April 2019, Abhan, the chairman of the General Election Supervisory Agency (BAWASLU), and Arief Budiman, the chairman of the General Elections Commission (KPU), were asked by PDI-P representative Komarudin Watubun about the hashtag. Both said that the hashtag didn't violate the law, as no special rules had then been made regarding the 2019 general election campaign.

=== Satire ===
The Chairman of the United Development Party, Muhammad Romahurmuziy, proposed the hashtag #Lanjutkan212 in response, detailing that Joko Widodo had led Surakarta City for 2 periods, led the Special Capital Region of Jakarta for one period, and was currently leading Indonesia. Romahurmuzy hoped that Joko Widodo would fulfill the hashtag's proposal of serving just one more term.

Secretary General of the NasDem Party Johnny G. Plate, who considered the movement unethical, insulted supporters of the movement by saying "the president will definitely end in 2019, as we will change the president. But the person will not change. So all we have to do is add to the hashtag #gantipresiden2019—just add in front of it 'ogah ah'" (which translates to "oh no").

== Aftermath ==
In May 2019, after the 2019 election had passed, Mardani stated that the #2019GantiPresiden movement had "closed its books".

== See also ==
- Hashtag activism
- Politics of Indonesia
- Jokowi Effect
