= Indonesian electoral law of 2017 =

UU Pemilihan Umum (UU Pemilu)

People's Representative Council
- Long title: Undang-Undang Nomor 7 Tahun 2017 tentang Pemilihan Umum (Act No. 7/2017 about Election)
- Citation: Act No. 7/2017
- Territorial extent: Indonesia
- Passed by: People's Representative Council
- Passed: 15 August 2017
- Commenced: 16 August 2017

Amends
- 1 act (Act No. 11/2006 on Government of Aceh)

Repeals
- 3 acts (Act No. 42/2008 on Presidential and Vice-Presidential Election, Act No. 15/2011 on Election Organizing Committees, Act No. 8/2012 on DPD, DPR, and DPRD Members Election)

Amended by
- Government Regulation in Lieu of Act No. 1/2022; Act No. 7/2023
- Status: In force

The Indonesian electoral act of 2017, also known in Indonesia as Undang-Undang Pemilu, is the law regulating elections in Indonesia. Officially, it is known as the Act Number 7 of 2017 (Undang-Undang Nomor 7 Tahun 2017, or UU 7/2017). The act was passed in July 2017 following nine months of debate in the People's Representative Council.

On 12 December 2022, an amendment of the act, Government Regulation in Lieu of Act No. 1/2022 issued. Subsequent amendment of the act, Act No. 7/2023 published on 24 May 2023.

== History ==
In anticipation of the simultaneous elections of 2019, the government initiated work on the draft for a new electoral law to replace the 2012 law. By August 2016, President Joko Widodo had received the draft law, and the People's Representative Council received it on 21 October the same year. During the discussion of the law, there were disputes over the proposed presidential threshold, with political parties divided into three camps – PDI-P, Golkar and Nasdem supported a higher threshold of 25% legislative vote/20% parliamentary seats, Gerindra, PAN and Demokrat supporting the removal of the threshold, and PKB and PPP supporting a lower threshold of 15% legislative vote/10% parliamentary seats.

The draft was voted into law on 20 July 2017. During the voting procedure, opposing parties – Gerindra, PAN, PKS and Demokrat conducted a mass walkout with all their members, which included three deputy speakers, except for another deputy speaker Fahri Hamzah who decided to remain. All remaining parties of the government coalition approved the 20 percent presidential threshold (Option A), with Hamzah the only opposition.

== Characteristics ==
=== Seat distribution ===
The 2017 law mandates an addition of 15 seats to the People's Representative Council, increasing the number to 575 divided across 80 electoral districts with 3-10 seats each, the additions given to provinces outside Java. In the 2022 amendment of the law, the number of seats in DPR was increased to 580, and electoral districts were increased to 84 to accommodate for new provinces in Papua.

The 2017 law sets the number of seats for local legislature according to the population, as defined in the ranges below:

Provincial (Note: Exceptions are Aceh and Jakarta, which has 81 and 106 seats allocated, respectively.)^{:Art. 188}

Population	DPRD Seats:
<1 million	35
1-3 million	45
3-5 million	55
5-7 million	65
7-9 million	75
9-11 million	85
11-20 million	100
>20 million	120

Regency/Municipal^{:Art. 191}

Population	DPRD Seats:
<100 thousand	20
100-200 thousand	25
200-300 thousand	30
300-400 thousand	35
400-500 thousand	40
500 thousand-1 million	45
1-3 million	50
3 million	55

The seats are also distributed in electoral districts with 3-12 members each. The law requires these electoral districts to follow the administrative borders of regencies/cities (provincial and national) or subdistricts (regency/city) if possible, though partition of a subdivision into multiple districts is allowed if not possible otherwise.^{:Art. 187,189,192}

In total, the 2017 law mandated 20,392 non-independent legislative seats for the 2019 election – 575 in the People's Representative Council, 2,207 in the Provincial Councils and 17,610 in the Regency/Municipal Councils.

=== Electoral system ===
The law maintains the electoral system used in 2014, using the open list system. Voters could vote directly for the candidate they wanted in a list of candidate names presented by the party. The candidates are then ranked by vote in their respective parties, and the party's quota is determined through the Webster/Sainte-Laguë method after the elimination of parties not meeting the threshold.

For presidential candidates, the winning candidate is determined by simple majority, with runoff voting for the top two candidates if no candidates manage to secure a first round majority. In addition, the winning candidate must secure at least 20% of votes in over half of the provinces (i.e. more than 17).^{:Art. 416}

=== Thresholds ===
During the previous election, parties are required to pass a parliamentary threshold of 3.5% to be represented in the People's Representative Council. The law increased this threshold to 4%. The presidential threshold was decided at the 25%/20% option, in which parties would need a total of 20% (112 for the 2019 election) legislative seats from the 2014 election, or 25% of the popular vote from 2014.

The threshold does not apply to local legislative elections, and all participating parties may win seats in provincial and municipal councils regardless of their total national vote.

=== Others ===
The law increased limits to campaign contributions – from Rp 1 billion to Rp 2.5 billion for individuals, and Rp 7.5 billion to Rp 25 billion for legal entities or corporations. In addition, it allowed political parties that participated in the 2014 election to skip party verification, despite the addition of North Kalimantan as a province requiring party offices.

== Lawsuit ==
The law has been challenged multiple times in the Constitutional Court (MK). A lawsuit by Vice President Jusuf Kalla on the term limits set by articles 169 and 227 was rejected in June 2018. A judicial review was also submitted regarding the presidential threshold (art. 222). A lawsuit against Article 182, which did not explicitly prohibit political party functionaries from being elected into the Regional Representative Council, was won in July 2018. In January 2025, MK ruled that the 20 percent electoral threshold was unconstitutional – as of the date of the ruling, there had been 36 separate lawsuits related to the clause.
