= Eva Kusuma Sundari =

Indonesian politician

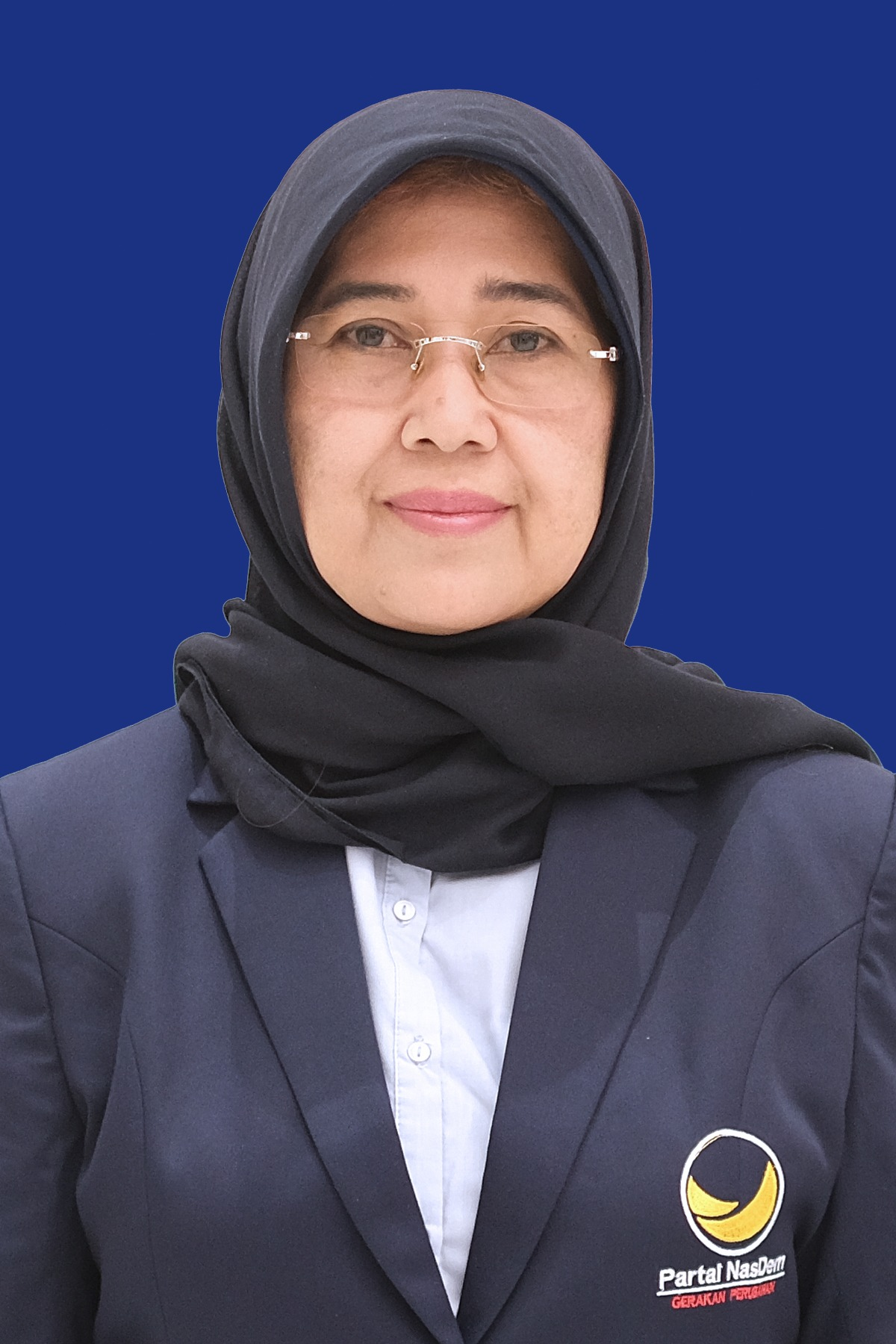

Member of People's Representative Council
- In office 11 January 2016 – 1 October 2019
- Preceded by: Pramono Anung
- In office 1 October 2004 – 2 October 2014
- Constituency: East Java VI

Personal details
- Born: 8 October 1965 (age 60) Nganjuk Regency, Indonesia
- Party: NasDem

Eva Kusuma Sundari (born in Nganjuk Regency, on 8 October 1965) is a member of the House of Representatives (People's Representative Council) who represents East Java. She is assigned to the Commission III which handles the Ministry of Law and Human Rights, the Attorney General of Indonesia, and the Indonesian National Police.

Eva Kusuma is known to be a critical member of the PDI-P. Sundari was elected in 2009 and was re-nominated as a member of the House of Representatives in 2014 for Blitar, Kediri, and Tulungagung. Sundari is running as a member of Nasdem in the 2024 legislative election in the East Java VIII electoral district.

Sundari is also a member of Subud. She is also a member of the Indonesian Women's Coalition (KPI) and East Java Women's Caucus Education Division.

Eva Kusuma Sundari obtained an MA degree in Politics of Alternative Development in 1990 from the International Institute of Social Studies (ISS), in The Hague, the Netherlands.
