= Aceh People's Party =

Aceh People's Party Partai Rakyat Aceh
- Chairman: Ridwan H Mukthar
- Secretary-General: Thamrin Ananda
- Founded: 16 March 2006
- Headquarters: Banda Aceh
- Ideology: Social democracy Progressivism; Pancasila; Aceh regionalism
- Political position: Centre-left to left-wing
- Ballot number: -
- DPR seats: 0

Website
- http://partairakyataceh.org

The Aceh People's Party (Indonesian: Partai Rakyat Aceh), (PRA) is a regional political party in Indonesia. It is a left-leaning party that opposes discrimination against women and has criticised the implementation of Islamic law in Aceh.

The party contested the 2009 elections in the province of Aceh, and set a target of 12 seats (25%) in the Aceh provincial legislature. However, it won only 36,574 votes, 1.7% of the Aceh turnout, and failed to win any seats. The party did not qualify to contest the 2014 elections.
