= Aceh House of Representatives =

Devolved unicameral legislature of the Indonesian province of Aceh

Aceh House of Representatives Dewan Perwakilan Rakyat Aceh Dèwan Peurwakilan Rakyat Acèh
- 2024–2029 Period
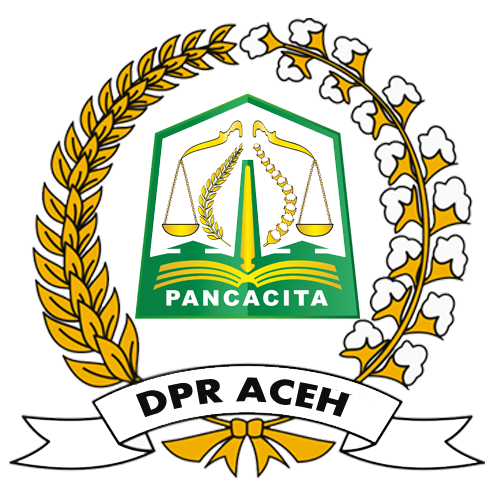

Type
- Type: Unicameral
- Term limits: 5 years

History
- Founded: 1949; 77 years ago
- New session started: 30 September 2024

Leadership
- Speaker: Zulfadhili, PA since 4 October 2024
- Deputy Speaker: Saifuddin Muhammad, NasDem since 4 October 2024
- Deputy Speaker: Ali Basrah, Golkar since 4 October 2024
- Deputy Speaker: Salihin, PKB since 4 October 2024

Structure
- Seats: 81
- Political groups: Government (52): PA (20); PKB (9); Democratic (7); Gerindra (5); PPP (5); PKS (4); PNA (1); PDI-P (1); Supported by (29): NasDem (10); Golkar (9); PAN (5); PASA (4); PDA (1)

Elections
- Voting system: Open list proportional representation
- Last election: 14 February 2024
- Next election: 2029

Meeting place
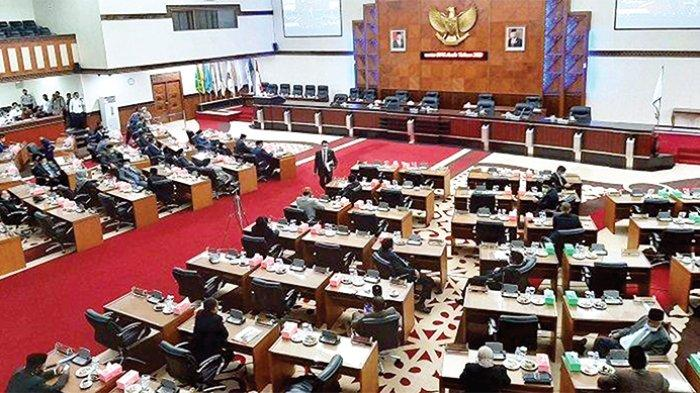
- DPRA Chamber – Aceh Provincial DPR Building; Jalan TGK. H. M. Daud Beureueuh; Postal code 23121; Kuta Alam, Banda Aceh; Aceh, Indonesia

Website
- dpra.acehprov.go.id

The Aceh House of Representatives (Indonesian: Dewan Perwakilan Rakyat Aceh; Acehnese: Dèwan Peurwakilan Rakyat Acèh, lit. 'People's Representatives Council of Aceh', abbreviated to DPR Aceh or DPRA) is the devolved unicameral legislature of the Indonesian province of Aceh. It has 81 members who are elected through general elections every five years, simultaneously with the national legislative election. Unlike other regional legislatures in Indonesia in general, it has unique characteristics according to the 2005 Aceh Provincial Government Act c. 11; such as the authority to name itself, the ability to determine the number of members (1¼ times more than ordinary regional legislatures), and the inclusion of Aceh's local parties.

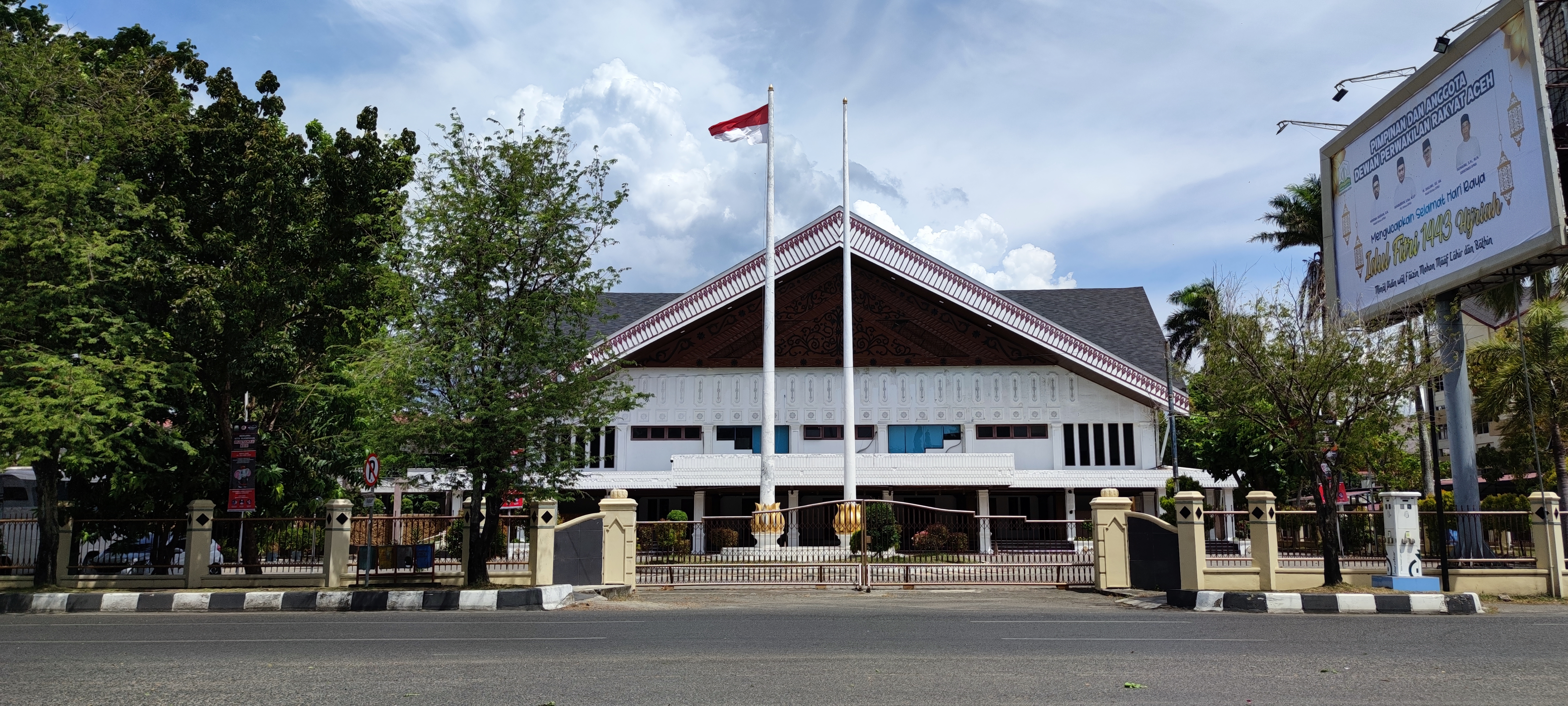
DPR Aceh Provincial Building

The current members of the DPRA are the result of the 2024 general election who were inaugurated on September 30 2024 by the Banda Aceh High Court, Dr. H. Suharjono, S.H., M.Hum., at the Aceh DPR Main Building. The composition of the DPRA members for the 2024–2029 period consists of 13 political parties where Aceh Party has the most seats, namely 20 seats.

The DPRA meets in Aceh's capital city of Banda Aceh.

== History ==
The DPRA was established in 1945, at that time it was called 'Regional National Committee' (KND). This was in accordance with the Transitional Regulations of the 1945 Constitution and followed by the Vice President's Decree dated October 16, 1945. The KND, which was first chaired by Tuanku Mahmud, continued by Mr. S. M. Amin, then changed its name to DPR in 1947.

The Aceh Residency was made a Province by the Deputy Prime Minister in accordance with PP No. 8 of 1948 on December 17, 1948 and the Aceh DPRD was established in accordance with PP No. 22 of 1948 from 1949–1950 with Tgk as Speaker. Abdul Wahab. However, the dissolution of Aceh Province in 1950 caused the DPRD to be dissolved.

Then Aceh Province was reborn in accordance with Law No. 24 of 1956. So the Transitional Regional House of Representatives DPRD was formed in 1957 with the first speaker Tgk. M. Abdul Syam who led until 1959. In and 1959–1961 it was chaired by Tgk. M. Ali Balwy.

Furthermore, in accordance with Presidential Decree No. 5 of 1960, the Mutual Cooperation People's Representative Council (DPRDGR) was formed in 1961–1964 chaired by the Governor of Aceh A. Hasjmy.

In accordance with Law No. 181 of 1965, the DPRDGR in 1965–1966 was chaired by Governor Nyak Adam Kamil, PD. The Speaker of the DPRD for the 1966–1968 period was Drs. Marzuki Nyak Man. The Speaker of the DPRD for the 1968–1971 period was H. M. Yasin.

With the Decree of the Prime Minister of the Republic of Indonesia No. 1/MISSI/1959 (Missi Hardi), then since May 26, 1959, Aceh was given the status of "Special Region" with the full name of the Special Region of Aceh Province. Since then, Aceh has had broad autonomy rights in the fields of Religion, Customs and Education. Furthermore, the DPRD in Aceh is determined according to the results of the Election.

== Function, duties and authorities ==
Functions of DPRA (Article 22 of Law No. 11/2006):

1. Legislation Function
2. Budget Function
3. Supervisory Function.

DPRA has the following duties and authorities:

- To form Aceh Qanun which is discussed with the Governor to obtain joint approval
- To supervise the implementation of Aceh Qanun and other laws and regulations
- To supervise the policies of the Aceh Government in implementing the Aceh development program, management of natural resources and other economic resources, as well as investment and international cooperation
- To propose the appointment and dismissal of the Governor/Vice Governor to the President through the Minister of Home Affairs
- To notify the Governor and Independent Election Commission of the end of the term of office of the Governor/Vice Governor
- To elect the Deputy Governor in the event of a vacancy in the position of Deputy Governor
- To approve international cooperation plans carried out by the Aceh Government
- To provide consideration for international cooperation plans made by the Government that are directly related to Aceh
- To provide consideration for legislative plans of the People's Representative Council that are directly related to the Aceh Government
- To approve cooperation plans between regions and/or with third parties that burden the community and the region
- To request a report on the Governor's accountability in the implementation government for government performance assessment * Propose the establishment of the Aceh KIP and the Election Supervisory Committee
- Conduct supervision and request reports on activities and budget use to the Aceh KIP in organizing the election of Governor/Vice Governor.

== General election results ==
=== 2024 Indonesian legislative election ===
The valid votes acquisition of political parties participating in the 2024 legislative election from each electoral district (constituency) for members of the DPRA is as follows.

Results of the 2024 general election

Electoral District (Constituency)	PKB	Gerindra	PDI-P	Golkar	NasDem	Labour	Gelora	PKS	PKN	Hanura	Garuda	PAN	PBB	Democratic	PSI	Perindo	PPP	PNA	Gabthat	PDA	PA	PAS-A	SIRA	Ummah	Valid Votes
Aceh 1	44,056	30,611	2,974	43,975	29,413	811	1,865	40,576	337	523	288	40,832	7,230	27,541	855	419	25,676	5,962	2,694	16,860	57,970	11,053	1,700	4,964	399,185
Aceh 2	38,702	31,236	973	43,067	27,242	659	1,031	16,130	238	419	101	24,284	1,442	26,942	224	44	25,348	1,612	2,878	2,091	116,758	29,532	1,099	761	392,813
Aceh 3	39,229	4,920	904	29,801	20,294	595	880	12,515	67	64	68	1,256	390	14,770	155	49	20,088	19,458	652	95	61,121	26,343	185	150	254,049
Aceh 4	27,603	21,036	25,752	34,770	19,379	290	1,014	19,068	86	5,466	109	8,161	8,412	11,564	166	212	8,766	8,496	369	34	20,334	1,226	534	3,989	226,836
Aceh 5	30,143	13,330	3,025	35,602	39,736	444	1,583	35,285	339	871	845	21,284	439	20,840	495	|18,674	23,941	1,106	1,687	159,513	37,305	15,366	1,025	1,025	462,994
Aceh 6	17,500	14,669	1,743	15,681	21,320	807	895	10,264	106	655	132	1,387	177	12,514	476	233	7,480	12,837	2,398	1,537	78,828	16,667	2,073	98	220,477
Aceh 7	13,867	23,251	3,589	41,257	|232	3,199	15,576	131	1,015	134	28,714	207	18,401	302	54	5,897	1,958	179	52	48,795	8,390	369	162	1,025	239,257
Aceh 8	21,476	10,769	13,386	24,511	19,615	197	481	18,749	34	16,783	53	18,469	85	19,847	214	25	589	884	29	17	21,067	575	10	86	187,951
Aceh 9	37,518	51,059	3,947	37,063	42,052	495	1,379	24,039	843	3,194	116	20,499	622	47,186	203	477	20,873	9,574	254	140	45,547	7,663	197	851	355,791
Aceh 10	39,656	19,233	3,721	22,183	20,938	880	4,635	28,067	161	531	160	24,160	2,448	38,700	539	283	40,478	3,268	319	150	63,152	8,762	11,807	1,244	335,475
Total Votes	309,750	220,114	60,014	327,910	263,515	5,410	16,962	220,269	2,342	29,521	2,006	189,046	21,452	238,305	3,629	1,912	173,869	87,990	10,878	22,663	673,085	147,516	33,340	13,330	3,074,828
Source: General Elections Commission of the Republic of Indonesia

== Composition ==
The following is the composition of DPRA members in the last four periods.

Political Party	Number of Seats in Period			
Political Party	2009–2014	2014–2019	2019–2024	2024–2029
PKB	1	1	▲3	▲9
Gerindra	0	▲3	▲8	▼5
PDI-P	0	0	▲1	1
Golkar	8	▲9	9	9
NasDem		8	▼2	▲10
PKS	4	4	▲6	▼4
PPP	4	▲6	6	▼5
PAN	5	▲7	▼6	▼5
Hanura	0	0	▲1	▼0
Democratic	10	▼8	▲10	▼7
PA	33	▼29	▼18	▲20
SIRA	0	0	▲1	▼0
PDA	1	1	▲3	▼1
PNA		3	▲6	▼1
PAS-A				4
PBB	1	1	▼0	0
PKPI	1	1	1	
Patriot	1			
Number of Members	69	▲81	81	81
Number of Parties	11	▲13	▲15	▼13

== Parliamentary groups ==
=== Factions ===
A faction is a forum for DPRA members to gather in order to optimize the implementation of the functions, duties, and authorities as well as the rights and obligations of the DPRA. Each faction has at least the same number of members as the number of commissions in the DPRA. Since 2009, the number of factions in the DPRA has tended to increase, namely 4 factions (period 2009–2014) and 7 factions (period 2014–2019). In the 2019–2024 period, the number of DPRA factions also increased to 9 factions as follows.

Faction	Member Parties	Chairman	Deputy Chairman	Secretary	Treasurer	Number of Members
Aceh Faction	PA; Hanura; SIRA	Tarmizi; Aceh 10	Yahdi Hasan; Aceh 8	Irfansyah; Aceh 7	Asmidar; Aceh 9	20
Democratic Faction	Democratic	Nurdiansyah Alasta; Aceh 8	none	Tantawi; Aceh 5	Edi Kamal; Aceh 8	10
Golkar Faction	Golkar	Ali Basrah; Aceh 8	Anshari Muhammad; Aceh 1 Muhammad Rizky; Aceh 7 Sartina; Aceh 9	Teuku Raja Keumangan; Aceh 10	Nuraini Maida; Aceh 5	9
Gerindra-PKPI Faction	Gerindra; PKPI	Abdurrahman Ahmad; Aceh 1	Khairil Syahrial; Aceh 2	Taufik; Aceh 4	Kartini Ibrahim; Aceh 2	9
PPP-NasDem Faction	PPP; NasDem	Ihsanuddin M.Z. Aceh 2	Teuku Irwan Djohan; Aceh 1	Amiruddin Idris; Aceh 3	Teungku Attarmizi Hamid; Aceh 9	8
PKB-PDA-PDI-P Faction	PKB; PDA; PDI-P	Azhar M.J. Roment; Aceh 9	Teungku Syarifuddin; Aceh 9	Salihin; Aceh 4	none	7
PAN Faction	PAN	Fuadri; Aceh 10	Asrizal H. Asnawi; Aceh 7	Tezar Azwar; Aceh 1	Sofyan Puteh; Aceh 5	6
PNA Faction	PNA	Safrijal (Gam-Gam); Aceh 9	Mukhtar Daud; Aceh 5	Teungku Haidar; Aceh 3	Darwati A. Gani; Aceh 1	6
PKS Faction	PKS	Zaenal Abidin; Aceh 10	Teungku Irawan Abdullah; Aceh 1	Purnama Setia Budi; Aceh 3	none	6

== Structure ==
Based on Article 110 Law of the Republic of Indonesia Number 23 of 2014 concerning Regional Government, the Provincial DPRD (AKD) equipment consists of:

1. Leaders
2. Deliberation Agency (Banmus)
3. Commission
4. Legislation Agency (Banleg)
5. Budget Agency (Banggar)
6. Honorary Agency (BK)
7. Other equipment (formed through plenary meetings)

=== DPRA Leadership ===
In accordance with statutory regulations, the Provincial DPRD consisting of: 35–44 people led by 1 speaker and 2 deputy speakers; 45–84 people were led by 1 speaker and 3 deputy speakers; and 85–100 people led by 1 speaker and 4 deputy speakers. Article 111 of the Law of the Republic of Indonesia Number 23 of 2014 concerning Regional Government The leadership of the DPRA consists of 1 speaker and 3 deputy speakers from Political Parties winners of seats and most votes sequentially.

=== Commissions ===
According to the provisions of the laws and regulations, the Provincial DPRD with 35–55 members can form 4 commissions and the Provincial DPRD with more than 55 members can form 5 commissions. Because the status of Aceh Province has special autonomy, the number of DPRA commissions can be formed more than the provisions of Law Number 23 of 2014 concerning Regional Government. DPRA has 6 commissions.

=== AKD Leadership ===
The following is a list of DPRA equipment for the 2019–2024 period.

AKD Name	Chairman	Deputy Chairman	Secretary	Members	References
DPRA Leadership	Zulfadhli, A.Md (PA); Aceh 5	Dalimi (Democratic); Aceh 2 Teuku Raja Keumangan (Golkar); Aceh 10; Safaruddin (Gerindra); Aceh 9	Secretary of DPRD (ex-officio)	77
BAMUS; Deliberative Body	37
BANGGAR; Budget Body	37
BK; Honorary Council	Sulaiman (PA) Aceh 1	Asib Amin (Gerindra) Aceh 10	Nurdiansyah Alasta (Democratic) Aceh 8 Ali Basrah (Golkar) Aceh 8 Teungku Attarmizi Hamid (PPP) Aceh 9
BANLEG; Legislation Body	Mawardi M (Tgk. Adek) (PA) Aceh 5	Ridwan Yunus (Gerindra) Aceh 5	12
Commission 1	Iskandar Usman Al-Farlaky (PA) Aceh 6	Samsul Bahri (PNA) Aceh 3	Yahdi Hasan, S.I.Kom. (PA) Aceh 8	11
Commission 2	Khairil Syahrial (Gerindra) Aceh 2	Fakhrurrazi H. Cut (PPP) Aceh 5	Irfansyah (PA) Aceh 7	9
Commission 3	Ansari Muhammad (Golkar) Aceh 1	Zaenal Abidin (PKS) Aceh 10	Azhar Abdurrahman (PA) Aceh 10	9
Commission 4	Zulfadhli (PA) Aceh 3	Abdurrahman Ahmad (Gerindra) Aceh 1	Tarmizi Panyang (PA) Aceh 5	13
Commission 5	M. Rizal Falevi Kirani (PNA) Aceh 2	Irpannusir (PNA) Aceh 9	Asmidar (PA) Aceh 9	8
Commission 6	Anwar (PA) Aceh 2	Tantawi (Democratic) Aceh 5	Teungku Muhammad Yunus M. Yusuf (PA) Aceh 6	9

24

== Electoral districts ==
In the 2019 legislative election and 2024 legislative election, DPRA elections are divided into 10 electoral districts known as dapil (constituency) as follows:

Constituency Name	Constituency Region	Number of Seats
ACEH 1	Aceh Besar Regency, Banda Aceh City, Sabang City	11
ACEH 2	Pidie Regency, Pidie Jaya Regency	9
ACEH 3	Bireuen Regency	7
ACEH 4	Central Aceh Regency, Bener Meriah Regency	6
ACEH 5	North Aceh Regency, Lhokseumawe City	12
ACEH 6	East Aceh Regency	6
ACEH 7	Aceh Tamiang Regency, Langsa City	7
ACEH 8	Southeast Aceh Regency, Gayo Lues Regency	5
ACEH 9	South Aceh Regency, Aceh Singkil Regency, Southwest Aceh Regency, Subulussalam City	9
ACEH 10	Nagan Raya Regency, West Aceh Regency, Aceh Jaya Regency, Simeulue Regency	9
TOTAL		81

== List of members ==
=== Current members ===
==== 2024–2029 Period ====
Member	Political Party	Electoral District (Constituency)	Valid Votes	Remarks
Nazaruddin, S.I.Kom.	PA	Aceh 1	19,221	
Hasballah, S.Ag.	PA	Aceh 1	9,096	
H. Aiyub Abbas, S.I.P.	PA	Aceh 2	29,827	
Tgk. H. Anwar Ramli, S.Pd., M.M.	PA	Aceh 2	21,115	
Zulfadhli, A.Md.	PA	Aceh 3	29,944	Speaker of the DPRA
Rusyidi Mukhtar, S.Sos. (Ceulangiek)	PA	Aceh 3	17,994	
Rahmuddinsyah, S.Sos.	PA	Aceh 4	11,584	
H. Ismail A. Jalil, S.E. (Wa's father)	PA	Aceh 5	33,297	Resigned due to participating in the 2024 local election.
Salmawati	PA	Aceh 5	3,754	PAW on behalf of Ismail A. Jalil.
Saiful Bahri (Pon Yahya)	PA	Aceh 5	32,381	
Tgk. H. Muharuddin, S.Sos.I., M.M.	PA	Aceh 5	22,016	
Sarjani (Imum Jon)	PA	Aceh 5	18,798	
Iskandar Usman Al-Farlaky, S.H.I., M.Si.	PA	Aceh 6	15,949	Resigned due to participating in the 2024 local election.
Muhammad Yusuf (Pang Ucok)	PA	Aceh 6		PAW on behalf of Iskandar Usman Al-Farlaky.
Azhari M. Nur alias Haji Maop	PA	Aceh 6	14,536	
Hj. Aisyah Ismail, S.Ag. (Sister Iin)	PA	Aceh 6	14,463	
Muhammad Zakiruddin	PA	Aceh 7	22,030	
Irfansyah	PA	Aceh 7	11,882	
Yahdi Hasan, S.I.Kom.	PA	Aceh 8	11,903	
T. Heri Suhadi, S.P. (Abu Heri)	PA	Aceh 9	19,674	
Tarmizi, S.P.	PA	Aceh 10	20,928	Resigned due to participating in the 2024 local election.
Azhar Abdurrahman	PA	Aceh 10	9,050	PAW in the name of Tarmizi.
H. Hendri Muliana	PA	Aceh 10	18,927	
H. Heri Julius, S.Sos., M.M.	NasDem	Aceh 1	9,323	
H. Syahrul Nurfa, S.H.	NasDem	Aceh 2	12,490	
Ir. H. Saifuddin Muhammad	NasDem	Aceh 3	14,438	Deputy Speaker of the DPRA
Sutarmi	NasDem	Aceh 4	6,431	
Muhammad Raji Firdana	NasDem	Aceh 5	10,719	
Martini	NasDem	Aceh 6	6,601	
Syamsuri, A.Mk.	NasDem	Aceh 7	16,552	
M. Hatta Bulkaini Skd.	NasDem	Aceh 8	9,365	
Zamzami, S.T., M.A.P.	NasDem	Aceh 9	17,134	
Nurchalis, S.P., M.Si.	NasDem	Aceh 10	7,983	
Dr. Ansari Muhammad, S.Pt., M.Sc.	Golkar	Aceh 1	15,518	
Khalid, S.Pd.I.	Golkar	Aceh 2	15,987	
Ilham Akbar, S.T.	Golkar	Aceh 3	21,418	
Diana Putri Amelia, S.M.	Golkar	Aceh 4	16,000	
M. Natsir (Memet)	Golkar	Aceh 5	7,434	
Muhammad Rizky	Golkar	Aceh 7	20,020	
H. Ali Basrah, S.Pd., M.M.	Golkar	Aceh 8	18.862	Deputy Speaker of DPRA
Muhammad Iqbal	Golkar	Aceh 9	11,172	
Dr. Teuku Raja Keumangan, S.H., M.H.	Golkar	Aceh 10	14,227	Resigned due to participating in the 2024 local election.
Ir. Iskandar	Golkar	Aceh 10	2,357	PAW for Teuku Raja Keumangan.
Munawar A.R. (Ngoh Wan), S.Sos.I., M.Sc.	PKB	Aceh 1	15,014	
Hery Ahmadi, S.Sc.	PKB	Aceh 2	18,721	
Muhammad Iqbal	PKB	Aceh 3	14,124	
Salihin, S.H.	PKB	Aceh 4	22,684	Deputy Speaker of the DPRA
Muhammad Wali, S.E., M.M.	PKB	Aceh 5	11,989	
Iskandar	PKB	Aceh 6	8,709	
Rijaluddin, S.H., M.H.	PKB	Aceh 8	13,407	
Dony Arega Rajes	PKB	Aceh 9	11,274	
Musdi Fauzi	PKB	Aceh 10	14,408	
Arif Fadillah, S.I.Kom., M.M.	Democratic	Aceh 1	8,785	
H. Dalimi, S.E. Ak.	Democratic	Aceh 2	18,183	
H. Tantawi, S.I.P., M.A.P.	Democratic	Aceh 5	7,808	
Nora Idah Nita, S.E.	Democratic	Aceh 7	13,325	
drh. Nurdiansyah Alasta, M.Kes.	Democratic	Aceh 8	18,007	
Romi Syah Putra, S.E.	Democratic	Aceh 9	18,603	
Edi Kamal, A.Md.Kep., S.K.M.	Democratic	Aceh 10	15,693	
Drs. H. Abdurrahman Ahmad	Gerindra	Aceh 1	12,087	
Khairil Syahrial, S.T., M.A.P.	Gerindra	Aceh 2	17,203	
Drs. H. Taufik, M.M.	Gerindra	Aceh 4	7,972	
Edy Asaruddin, S.E.	Gerindra	Aceh 7	10,238	
Safaruddin, S.Sos., M.S.P.	Gerindra	Aceh 9	28,684	Resigned due to participating in the 2024 local election.
Hadi Surya, S.TP., M.T.	Gerindra	Aceh 9	14,416	PAW for Safaruddin.
Iskandar Ali, S.Pd., M.Si.	PAN	Aceh 1	19,793	
Sofyan Puteh	PAN	Aceh 5	16,681	
Raja Lukman Ziaulhaq	PAN	Aceh 7	13,229	
Irpannusir, S.Ag., S.E., M.I.Kom.	PAN	Aceh 9	13,068	
Fuadri, S.Si., M.Si.	PAN	Aceh 10	17,989	
Illiza Sa'aduddin Djamal, M.B.A.	PPP	Aceh 1	13,485	Resigned due to participating in the 2024 local election.
H. Ihsanuddin M.Z., S.E., M.M.	PPP	Aceh 2	17,896	
Dr. H. Amiruddin Idris, S.E., M.Sc.	PPP	Aceh 3	16,871	
Teungku H. Attarmizi Hamid	PPP	Aceh 9	10,144	
Teungku H. Mawardi Basyah, S.Sos.	PPP	Aceh 10	13,786	
Tati Meutia Asmara, S.K.H., M.Sc.	PKS	Aceh 1	11,236	
Armiyadi, S.P.	PKS	Aceh 5	16,978	
Usman I.A., S.P.	PKS	Aceh 9	7,327	
Ihya Ulumuddin, S.P., M.H.	PKS	Aceh 10	8,154	
Senior H. Rasyidin Ahmad, S.E, S.Sos.I. (Waled Nura)	PAS-A	Aceh 2	13,915	
Senior Nurdin M. Judon (Abi Nas)	PAS-A	Aceh 3	20,763	
Teuku Zulfadli, S.Pd.I. (Waled Landeng)	PAS-A	Aceh 5	7,017	
Tgk. Muhammad (Abi Alue Lhok)	PAS-A	Aceh 6	11,417	
Syarifah Nurul Carissa, S.Tr.T.	PNA	Aceh 5	9,380	
Salwani,S.K.M.	PDI-P	Aceh 4	10,300	
Eddi Shadiqin	PDA	Aceh 1	8,170	

== See also ==
- Regional House of Representatives#Names
