= Nanggroe Aceh Party =

Nanggroe Aceh Party Partai Nanggroe Aceh
- Abbreviation: PNA
- Chairman: Irwandi Yusuf
- Secretary-General: Miswar Fuady
- Founded: 4 December 2011
- Split from: Aceh Party
- Headquarters: Banda Aceh
- Ideology: Aceh nationalism Aceh regionalism
- National affiliation: None Regional: Advanced Aceh Coalition (2024–present) (Note: Alligance with: PKB, Democratic, PKS, Gerindra, PPP, PA, PDI-P, Gelora, Labour, PKN, SIRA, Hanura, PBB, Ummat, Gabthat, PSI, Garuda)
- Ballot number: 18
- DPRD I seats: 1 / 81
- DPRD II seats: 21 / 665

Website
- http://www.pna.or.id

The Nanggroe Aceh Party (Indonesian: Partai Nanggroe Aceh, PNA) or Aceh State Party is a regional political party in Indonesia. It was established as National Aceh Party (Partai Nasional Aceh), as a result of a split within the Aceh Party triggered by disagreements over the candidate for governor in the 2012 Aceh gubernatorial election. It was founded by Irwandi Yusuf, who was Aceh's governor between 2007 and 2012. The party qualified to contest the 2014 elections in Aceh, and won 4.7 percent of the vote, winning three seats in the provincial legislature.

In 2017, the party changed its initial name with the "N" now means Nanggroe (Acehnese for land) instead of Nasional.

== Electoral history ==
Election	Ballot number	Seats (in DPRA)
2014	12	3
2019	18	6
2024	18	1

== Elected officials ==
The party holds six seats out of 81 in the People's Representative Council of Aceh following the 2019 legislative election. It also holds the speakership of the regency council of South Aceh Regency. In 2020, Amran, chairman of PNA in South Aceh, became regent of South Aceh following the death of his predecessor. In the 2024 Indonesian local elections, two party members were elected as regional executives: Sayuti Abubakar as mayor of Lhokseumawe and Safriadi Manik as regent of Aceh Singkil.
