= SIRA Party =

Aceh People's Independent Solidarity Party Partai Soliditas Independen Rakyat Aceh
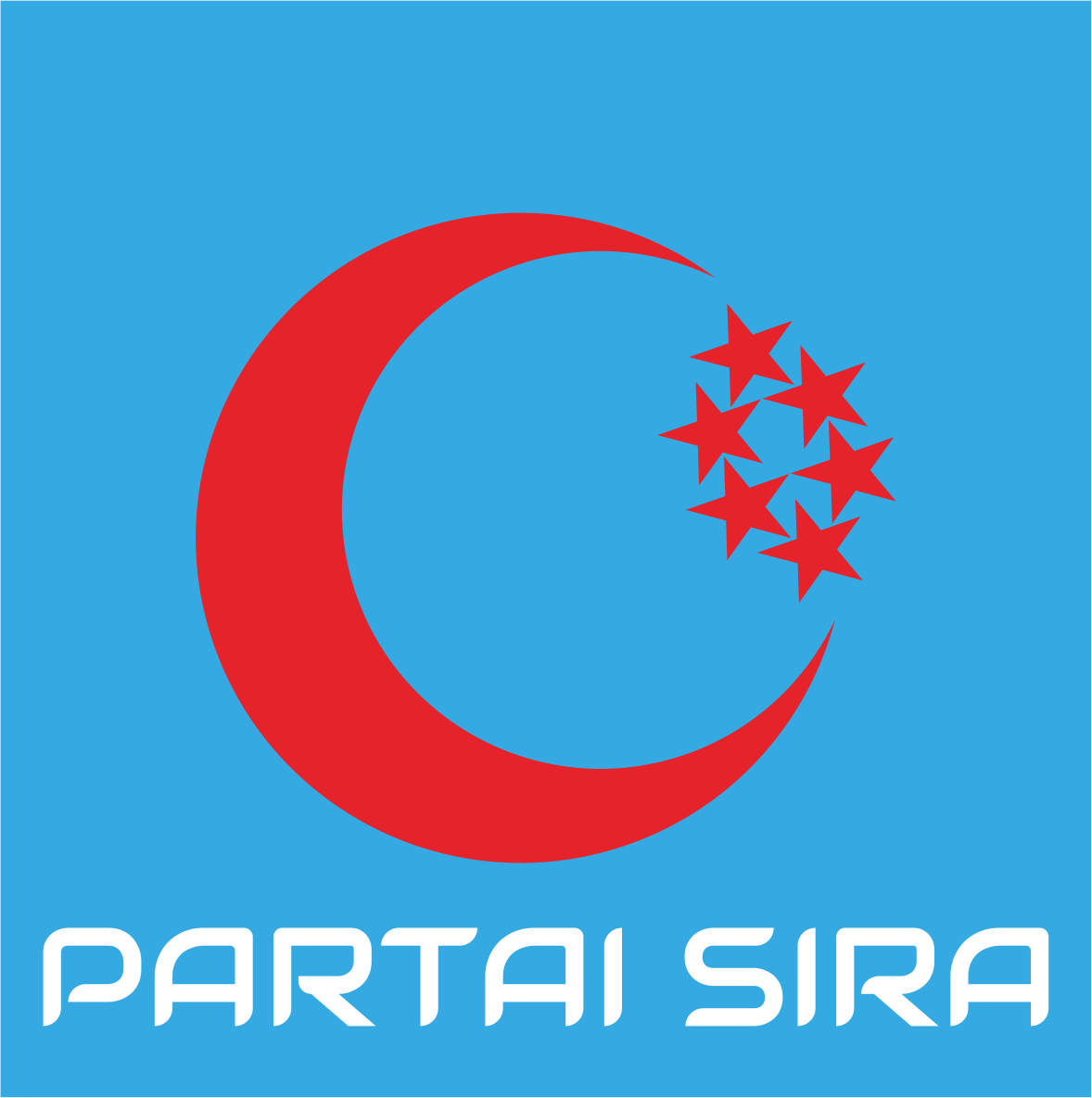
- Chairman: Muslim Syamsuddin
- Secretary-General: Muhammad Daud
- Founded: 10 December 2007
- Headquarters: Banda Aceh
- Ideology: Aceh regionalism
- National affiliation: None Regional: Advanced Aceh Coalition (2024–present) (Note: Allegiance with: PKB, Democratic, PKS, Gerindra, PPP, PNA, PDI-P, Gelora, Labour, PKN, PA, Hanura, PBB, Ummat, Gabthat, PSI, Garuda)
- Ballot number: 23
- DPRD II seats: 3 / 665

Website
- https://partaisira.org

The SIRA Party (Indonesian: Partai Soliditas Independen Rakyat Aceh, lit. 'Aceh People's Independent Solidarity Party') is a regional political party in Indonesia active in Aceh province. The party was founded in December 2007 by then-Deputy Governor Muhammad Nazar.

It contested the 2009 elections in the province of Aceh, where it was seen as the main challenger for the Aceh Party. However, the party won only 38,157 votes, or 1.78% of the Aceh turnout. It failed to qualify for the 2014 elections. In the 2019 elections, it qualified and won a single seat in the Aceh provincial legislature. The party is qualified again to participate in 2024 election.

== History ==
The party was initially founded as "Information Center for Aceh Referendum" (Sentral Informasi Referendum Aceh) in 1999 by Aceh activist Muhammad Nazar as a pressure group seeking peaceful resolution to Aceh conflict, including for a possibility of an independence referendum as alternative of armed resistance promoted by the Free Aceh Movement.

The organisation was revamped as a political party and its name changed to "Independent Voice of the Acehnese Party" (Suara Independen Rakyat Aceh), while maintaining the SIRA abbreviation, for the 2009 elections. Amendments to the party statute in 2012 recognised the SIRA abbreviation as the official party name, which now stood for "Independent Solidity of the Acehnese Party" (Soliditas Independen Rakyat Aceh).

At the party congress in April 2022, the party's Executive Council decided to "honourably discharge" party founder Muhammad Nazar as chairperson.

== General Chairman ==
Portrait	General Chairman	Period
	Muhammad Taufiq Abda	2007–2012
	H. Muhammad Nazar, S.Ag.	2017–2022
	Muslim Syamsuddin, S.T., M.A.P.	2022–2027

== Gallery ==
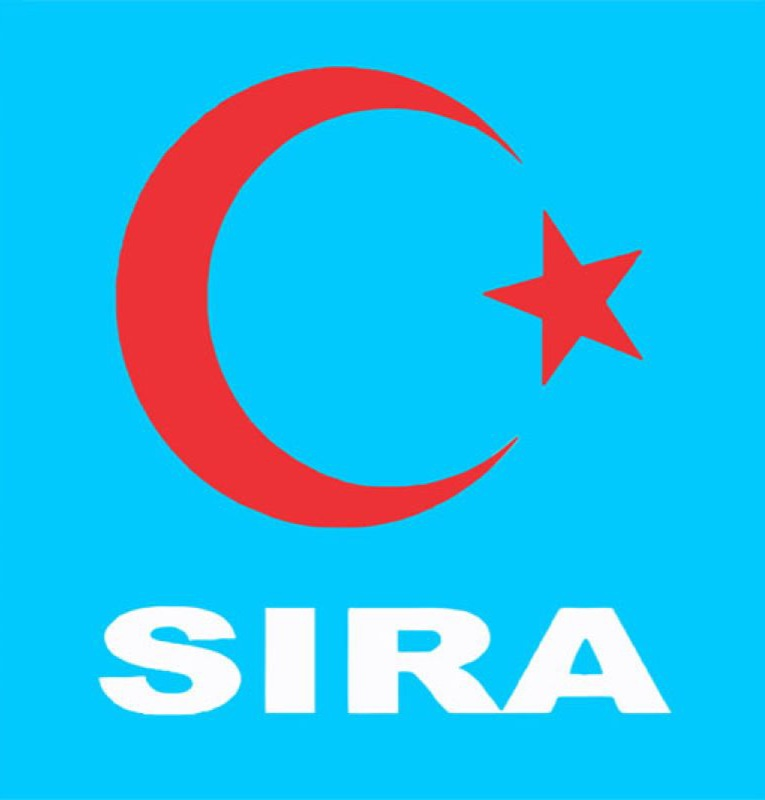
SIRA Party Logo (2012–2022)
