= Aceh Party =

Aceh Party Partai Aceh Peurté Acèh
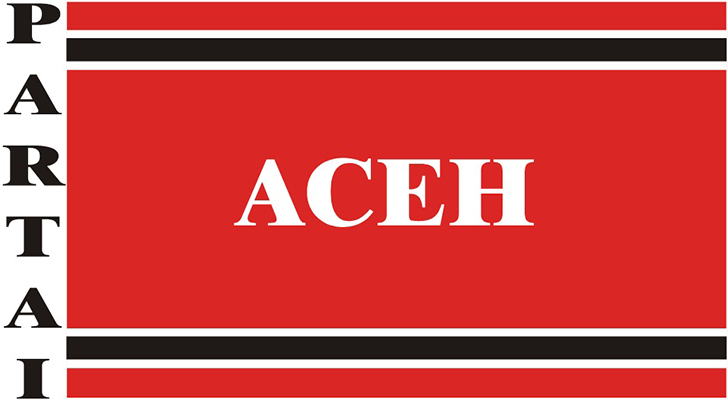
- Abbreviation: PA
- Chairman: Muzakir Manaf
- Secretary-General: Aiyub Abbas
- Spokesperson: Nurzahri
- Founded: 7 June 2007; 19 years ago
- Headquarters: Jl. Dr. Mr. T. Muhammad Hasan, Gampong Blang Cut, Lueng Bata, Banda Aceh, 23248
- Youth wing: Muda Seudang; Pemuda Partai Aceh
- Women's wing: Putroe Aceh
- Ideology: Islamism; Islamic fundamentalism Acehnese nationalism Aceh regionalism
- Political position: Right-wing to far-right
- National affiliation: Advanced Indonesia Coalition (2024–present) Regional: Advanced Aceh Coalition (2024–present) (Note: Alligance with: National Awakening Party, Democratic, Prosperous Justice Party, Gerindra, United Development Party, Nanggroe Aceh Party, Indonesian Democratic Party of Struggle, Gelora, Labour, Nusantara Awakening Party , SIRA, People's Conscience Party, Crescent Star Party, Ummat, Gabthat, Indonesian Solidarity Party, Garuda)
- Anthem: Hymne Partai Aceh (Aceh Party Hymn); Mars Partai Aceh (Aceh Party March)
- Ballot number: 21
- DPRD I: 20 / 81
- DPRD II: 116 / 665

Website
- www.partaiaceh.org

The Aceh Party (Indonesian: Partai Aceh; Acehnese: Peurté Acèh, PA) is a regional political party in Indonesia. It contested the 2009 elections in the province of Aceh, and is the largest party in the Aceh provincial legislature. It currently controls the governorship. Aceh Party is led by the former guerrilla fighter of the Free Aceh Movement (GAM) and the current governor, Muzakir Manaf.

== History ==
The Aceh Party was formerly known as GAM Party (Partai GAM) after the Free Aceh Movement (GAM), a separatist group that waged a war for Aceh independence from 1976 to 2005. Many of the party's leaders were senior figures in GAM, including its chairman Muzakir Manaf, who was a former commander of GAM's military wing.

=== 2009 elections ===
The party stood in the 2009 elections in Aceh, and was predicted to win in at least 15 of Aceh's 21 regencies. The party set a target of 70% of the Aceh vote. During the election campaign, party buildings and vehicles were attacked, including the use of grenades and bombs. Shots were fired at party members. On several occasions, Indonesian Armed Forces personnel lowered Aceh Party flags.

The party won 46.91% of the votes in the province, by far the largest share, beating both local and national parties. This was enough to give it 33 of the 69 seats in the provincial legislature.

=== 2012 election ===
Zaini Abdullah of the Aceh Party was elected with 55.9% of the vote in the Acehnese gubernatorial election of 2012.

=== 2014 elections ===
The party contested the 2014 legislative elections, again only in Aceh. Despite optimistically claiming it would win 60 to 70% of the Acehnese vote during the election campaign, its vote fell sharply to 35.3 percent, although this was enough for a plurality. One reason for the drop in its vote was the internal party conflict that had raged since February 2011, which led to several Aceh Party members to leave to establish the Aceh National Party. The Aceh Party won 29 of the 81 seats in the provincial legislature.

== Leaders ==
No.	Name	Image	Constituency / title	Term of office	
No.	Name	Image	Constituency / title	Took office	Left office
General Chairman of the Aceh Party (2007–present)
1	Muzakir Manaf (born 1964)		Governor of Aceh	7 June 2007	Incumbent

== Party Management Structure ==
The following is the management structure of the DPA-PA for the 2023–2028 period:

=== Majelis Tuha Peut ===
- Chairman: Tgk. Malik Mahmud Al-Haythar
- Vice Chairman: Tgk. H. Muhammad Ali (Abu Paya Pasi)
- Members:
  - H. Muzakir Manaf (Mualem)
  - H. Aiyub Bin Abbas
  - H. Usman Abubakar (Pos Men)
  - Abi Mawardi (Aceh Rayek)
  - H. Mukhtaruddin (Abu Mekkah)
  - Tgk. H. Sofyan Mahdi Bin Bayak (Abon Arongan)
  - Tgk. H. Azhari Abd. Latief

=== Advisory Board ===
- Chairman: Saiful Bahri (Pon Yaya)
- Vice Chairman: Iskandar Usman Al-Farlaky
- Members:
  - Tarmizi, M. Yusuf (Pang Ucok)
  - Muhammad Sulaiman
  - Rita Satria Syarbaini
  - Tgk. M. Nazir
  - Jauhari
  - Tgk. M. Isa

=== Party Court ===
- Chairman: Muslim Usman
- Vice Chairman: Tgk. Akhyar A Rasyid
- Members:
  - Drs. H. Bukhari
  - Ir. T. Iskandar
  - Mohd. Nurdin Bin M. Hasan
  - Drs. Tgk. H. Adnan Beuransah
  - Hasnawi

=== Aceh Leadership Council of the Aceh Party ===
- General Chairman: H. Muzakir Manaf (Mualem)
- Daily Chairperson: Tgk. H. Anwar Ramli
- Deputy Chairperson:
  - Ir. H. Jufri Hasanuddin, MM
  - Ermiadi Abdul Rahman
  - Juanda Djamal
  - Lukman Hakim
  - Azhari M. Nur H. Maop
  - Suadi Sulaiman
  - Efendi
  - Nurzahri
  - Fadjri
  - Kennedi Husen
  - Tgk. Zulfanuddin
  - Syamsul Bahri Sarjev
  - Sri Mawarni
  - Alfa Rahman
  - Hj. Ummi Kalsum
  - Dr. Fajran Zain
  - Muhammad Raviq

==== Secretary General ====
- Secretary General: H. Aiyub Abbas, S.I.P
- Deputy Secretary General:
  - Dr. T. Rasyidin
  - Dr. H. Said Mulyadi
  - Taufik Muhammad
  - Samsuar M. Thaleb
  - Sofyan
  - Agam Nur Muhajir
  - Hj. Siti Nahziah
  - Syarifah Nafisah
  - Ayyub Sabar
  - Said Firdaus
  - Tgk. Muksalmina
  - Safrizal
  - Muhammad Zakiruddin
  - Sarjani (Imum Jhon)
  - Hj. Marlina Usman
  - Haspiana Hanafiah
  - T. Nasruddinsyah

==== Treasurer ====
- General Treasurer: Zulfadhli (Abang Samalanga)
- Deputy Treasurer:
1. Hj. Aisyah Ismail,
2. Hendri Muliana
3. Nurlaili
4. Tgk. H. Muharuddin
5. Arman
6. Zakaria N. Yacob
7. H. Sopian Adami
8. Abdul Jalil
9. Hj. Cut Fatma Dahlia
10. Sitti Nurmasyithah
11. Fajriah
12. Nur Ainun
13. Nurliana
14. Bertina
15. Asnidar
16. Syarifah Nurjannah
17. Cut Mardhiah
18. Suryana Usman
19. Nona Supriana
20. Chairunnisa
21. Rahmi Bustami
22. Mustawa Agustina
23. Tetty Verawati
24. Nur Afni
25. Erita
26. Nelus Saidah

== Election results ==
=== Aceh House of Representatives ===
Election	Leader	Seats		Total votes	Share of votes	Outcome of election
Election	Leader	No.	±	Total votes	Share of votes	Outcome of election
2009	Muzakir Manaf	33 / 69				Governing coalition
2014	Muzakir Manaf	29 / 81	▼4			Governing coalition
2019	Muzakir Manaf	18 / 81	▼11	568,110	21.35%	Opposition
2024	Muzakir Manaf	20 / 81	▲2	683,768		Governing coalition

=== Gubernatorial election results ===
Election	Ballot number	Candidate	Running mate	Total votes	Share of votes	Outcome
2012	1	**Zaini Abdullah**	**Muzakir Manaf**	1,327,695	55.9%	Elected
2017	1	**Muzakir Manaf**	Teuku Al Khalid	766,427	31.74%	Lost
2024	2	**Muzakir Manaf**	Fadhlullah	1,492,846	53.27%	Elected

Note: Bold text indicates the party member
