= Gabthat Party =

Aceh's Generation Unite in Obedience and Piety Partai Generasi Aceh Beusaboh Tha'at dan Taqwa Peureute Geuneurasi Aceh Beusaboh Thaat dan Taqwa
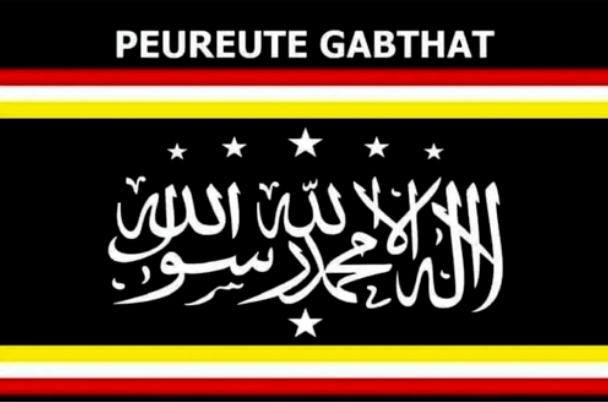
- Chairman: Ahmad Tajuddin
- Secretary-General: Bahaudin
- Founded: 4 December 2005 (as an educational foundation); 2007 (as a political party)
- Headquarters: Banda Aceh
- Membership (2024): 9,586
- Ideology: Islamism
- National affiliation: None Regional: Advanced Aceh Coalition (2024–present) (Note: Allegiance with: PKB, Democratic, PKS, Gerindra, PPP, PNA, PDI-P, Gelora, Labour, PKN, SIRA, Hanura, PBB, Ummat, PA, PSI, Garuda)
- Ballot number: 19
- DPRD I seats: 0 / 81
- DPRD II seats: 0 / 665

Aceh's Generation Unite in Obedience and Piety Party (Indonesian: Partai Generasi Aceh Beusaboh Tha'at dan Taqwa, Acehnese: Peureute Geuneurasi Aceh Beusaboh Thaat dan Taqwa), often known by its acronym Gabthat, is a regional political party in Indonesia, which was founded in 2007. Actually, Gabthat was founded on 4 December 2005 as an educational foundation. This party registered for the 2009 and 2019 general elections but did not pass verification.

Gabhat run in the 2024 Indonesian general election with the ballot number of 18.

No	Chairman	Period
1	Ahmad Tajuddin	2021–2024
