= 2024 Indonesian general election =

- 24 February 2024
- Presidential election
- 14 February 2024
- Registered: 204,422,181 (▲6.04%)
- Turnout: 82.39% (▲0.42pp)
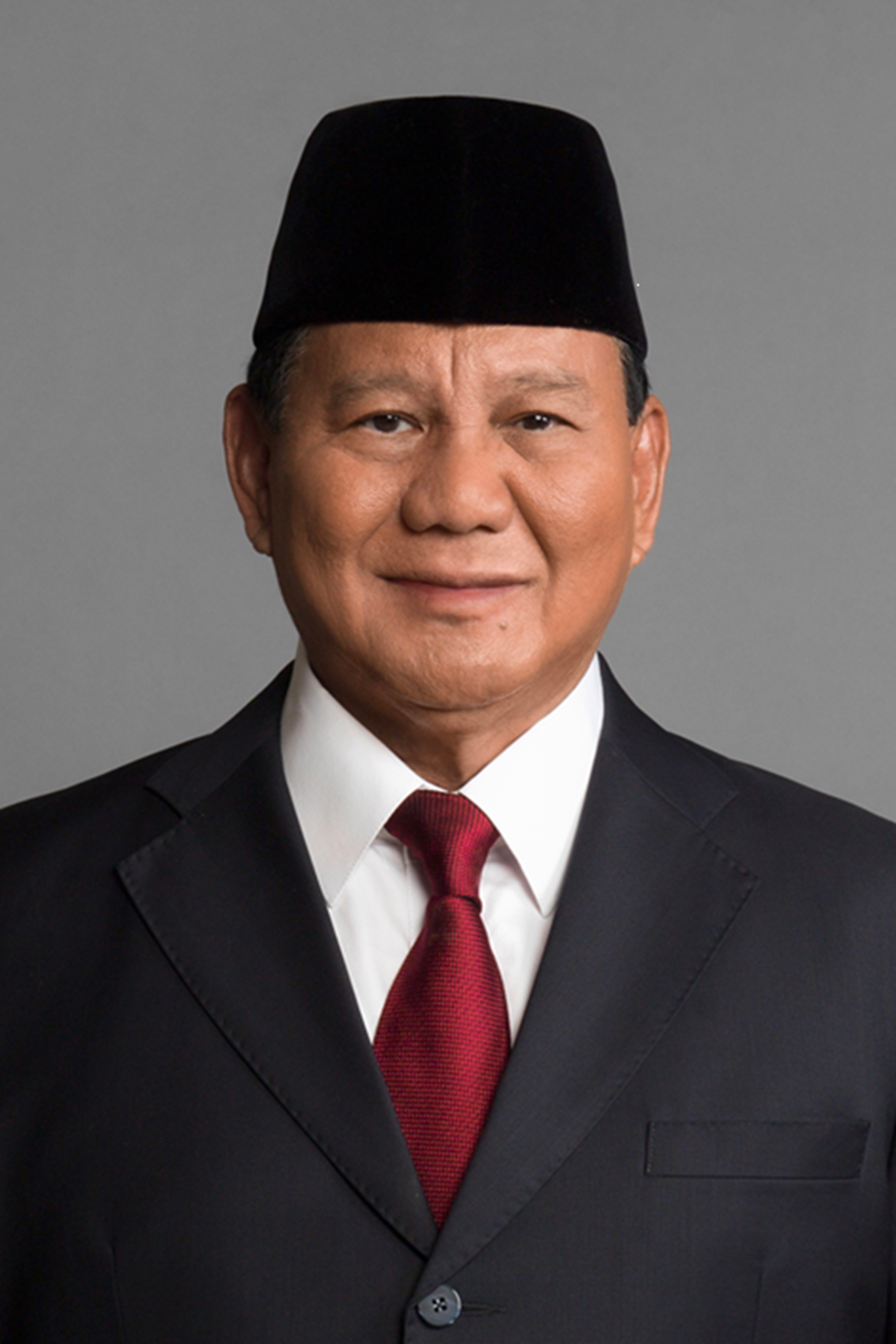

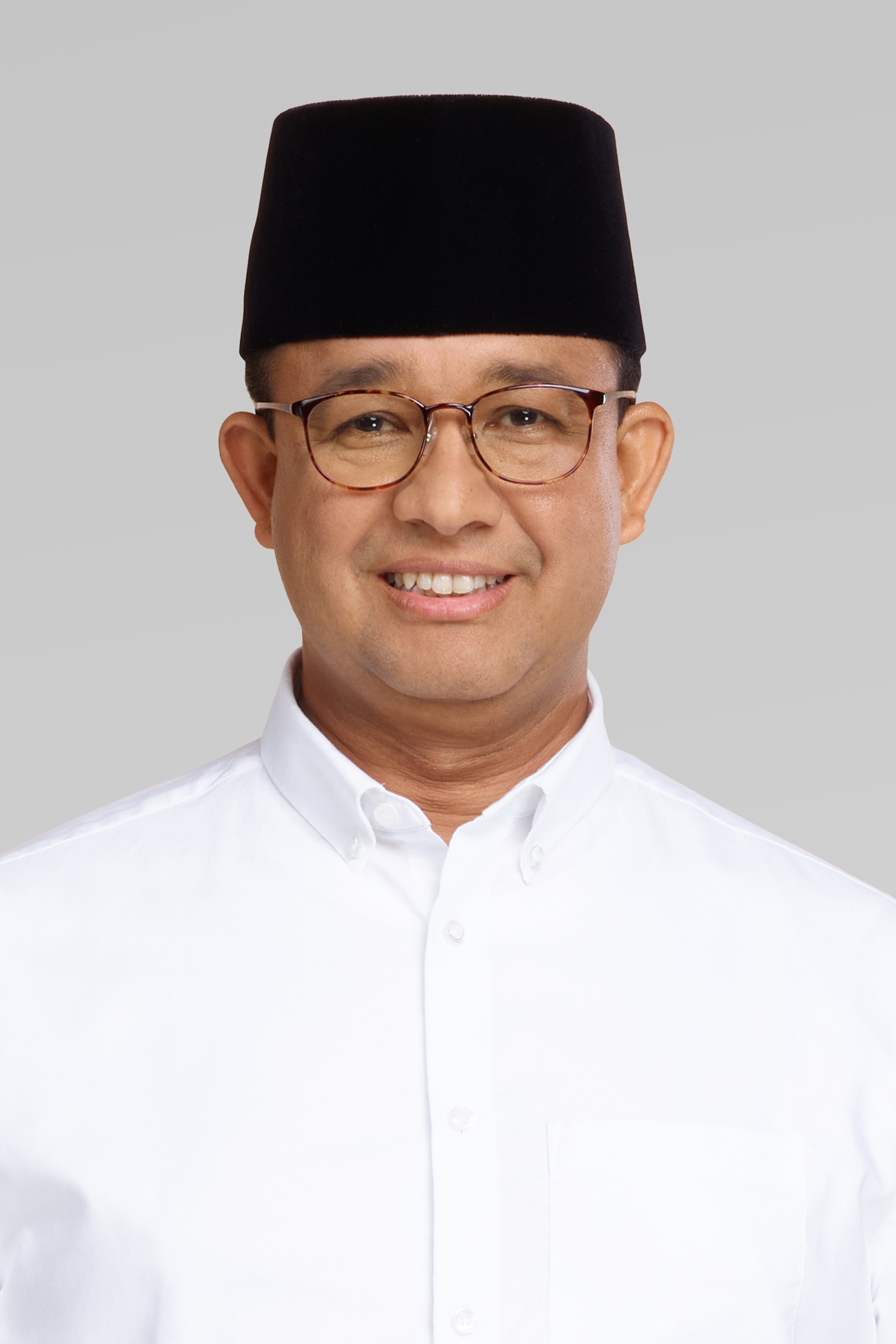

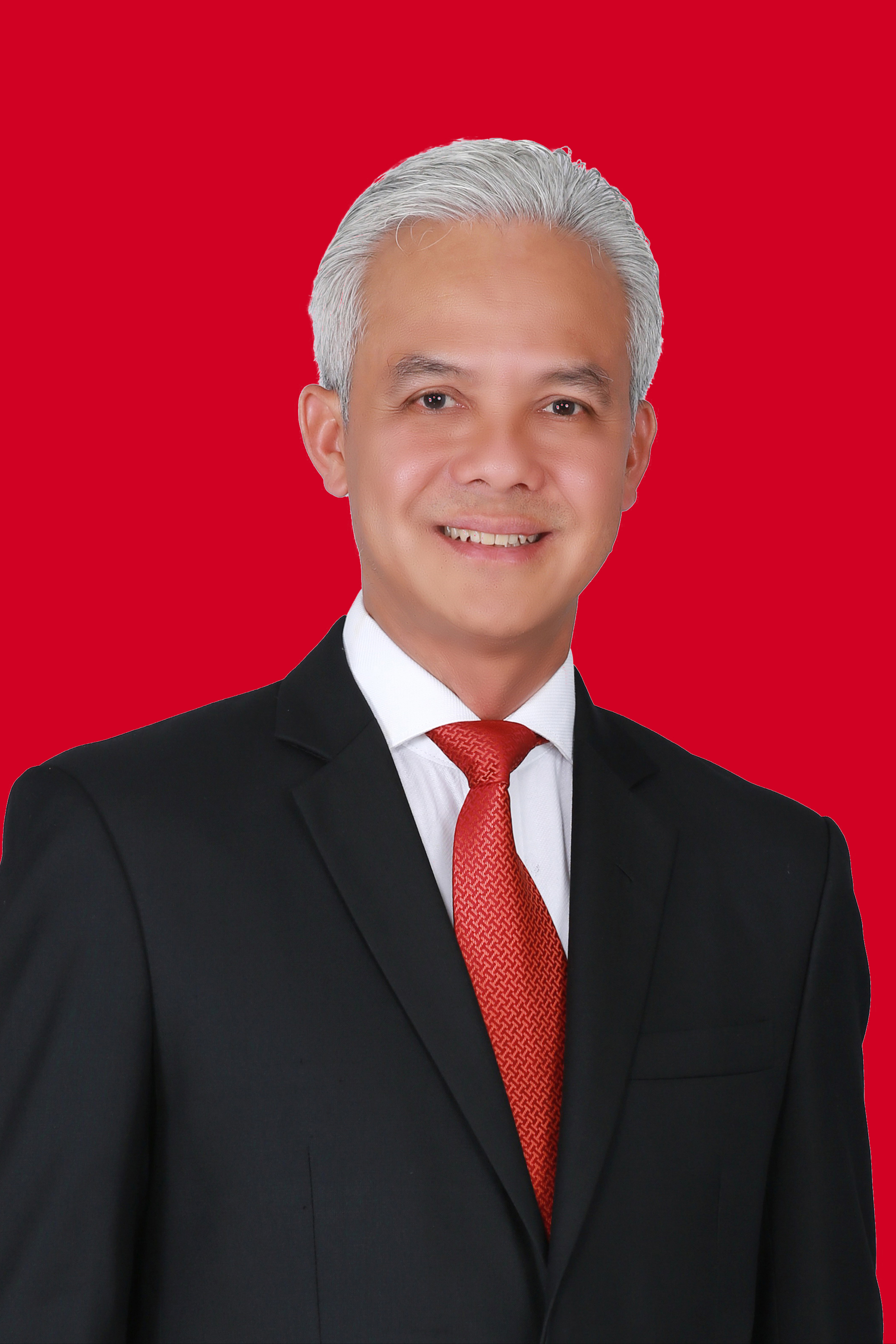
Candidate	Prabowo Subianto	Anies Baswedan	Ganjar Pranowo
Party	Gerindra	Independent (Note: Nominated by NasDem)	PDI-P
Alliance	Advanced Indonesia (Note: Including Gerindra, Golkar, the Democratic Party, the National Mandate Party, the Indonesian Solidarity Party, the Crescent Star Party, the Garuda Party, the Gelora Party, and the Aceh Party.)	Change (Note: Including NasDem, the National Awakening Party, the Prosperous Justice Party, the Ummah Party, the Aceh Abode Party, the Independent Solidity of the Acehnese Party, and the Aceh Just and Prosperous Party.)	Alliance of Parties (Note: Including PDI-P, the United Development Party, the Indonesian Unity Party, and the People's Conscience Party.)
Running mate	Gibran Rakabuming	Muhaimin Iskandar	Mahfud MD
Popular vote	96,214,691	40,971,906	27,040,878
Percentage	58.59%	24.95%	16.47%
President before election
Joko Widodo
PDI-P
Elected President
Prabowo Subianto
Gerindra
- Legislative election
- All 580 seats in the House of Representatives; 291 seats needed for a majority
- Turnout: 82.03% (▲0.34pp)
Party	Leader	Vote %	Seats	+/–
PDI-P	Megawati Sukarnoputri	16.72	110	−18
Golkar	Airlangga Hartarto	15.29	102	+17
Gerindra	Prabowo Subianto	13.22	86	+8
PKB	Muhaimin Iskandar	10.62	68	+10
NasDem	Surya Paloh	9.66	69	+10
PKS	Ahmad Syaikhu	8.42	53	+3
Demokrat	Agus Harimurti Yudhoyono	7.43	44	−10
PAN	Zulkifli Hasan	7.24	48	+4
This lists parties that won seats. See the complete results below.

Speaker before	Speaker after
Puan Maharani; PDI-P	Puan Maharani; PDI-P

General elections were held in Indonesia on 14 February 2024 to elect the president, vice president, and People's Consultative Assembly (MPR), which consists of the House of Representatives (DPR), the Regional Representative Council (DPD), and members of local legislative bodies (DPRD) at the provincial and city or regency levels. The newly elected members of the MPR were sworn in on 1 October 2024, while the elected president and vice president was sworn in on 20 October 2024. Incumbent President Joko Widodo was ineligible to run for a third term due to limitations established by the Indonesian constitution.

The election had over 204 million eligible voters voting in over 800,000 polling stations across the country on the same date. Three presidential candidates contested the election: defense minister and retired Army General Prabowo Subianto, running with the Mayor of Surakarta Gibran Rakabuming Raka, former Governor of Jakarta Anies Baswedan, running with House Deputy Speaker Muhaimin Iskandar, and former Governor of Central Java Ganjar Pranowo running with Political, Legal, and Security Coordinating Minister Mahfud MD. The legislative election saw 24 contesting parties – including six exclusively in Aceh – field over 250,000 candidates contesting over 20,000 seats.

In the presidential elections, Prabowo received a majority of the vote in the first round, requiring no runoffs. Prabowo's 96.2 million votes were the highest received by any candidate in a democratic election in Indonesia, surpassing Joko Widodo's 85.6 million votes won in the 2019 election. In the legislative elections, eight parties qualified for the national legislature, with the Indonesian Democratic Party of Struggle (PDI-P) remaining the largest party in the House of Representatives despite losing seats. Golkar gained the most seats, while the United Development Party (PPP) lost national parliamentary representation for the first time in its history as it fell short of the 4% parliamentary threshold.

The 2024 election marked the first time since the beginning of the Reform era in 1998 that a single political party secured the largest number of seats in the House of Representatives for three consecutive general elections. The Indonesian Democratic Party of Struggle (PDI-P) accomplished this milestone.

It was also the first time since 2004 that the political party of the elected president did not win the most seats in the legislature. In this election, the Great Indonesia Movement Party (Gerindra), led by President-elect Prabowo Subianto, placed third in terms of parliamentary seats, although it continues to enjoy strong coalition support.

The 2024 legislative election also marked the fourth consecutive increase in parliamentary seats for Gerindra since its first participation in 2009. Similarly, the National Democratic Party (NasDem) saw its third consecutive gain in seats since it first contested a legislative election in 2014.

This election is the fifth in a row where the candidate who won in the 12 provinces below, Bangka Belitung Islands, Central Java, North Sumatra, Central Kalimantan, North Sulawesi, East Java, Yogyakarta, Lampung, Papua, Riau Islands, Jakarta, and Central Sulawesi, also won the general election, strengthening their status as bellwether provinces.

== Electoral system ==
The election was held in accordance with the Law No. 7 of 2017. The General Elections Commission (KPU), an independent statutory body, was responsible for organizing the election.

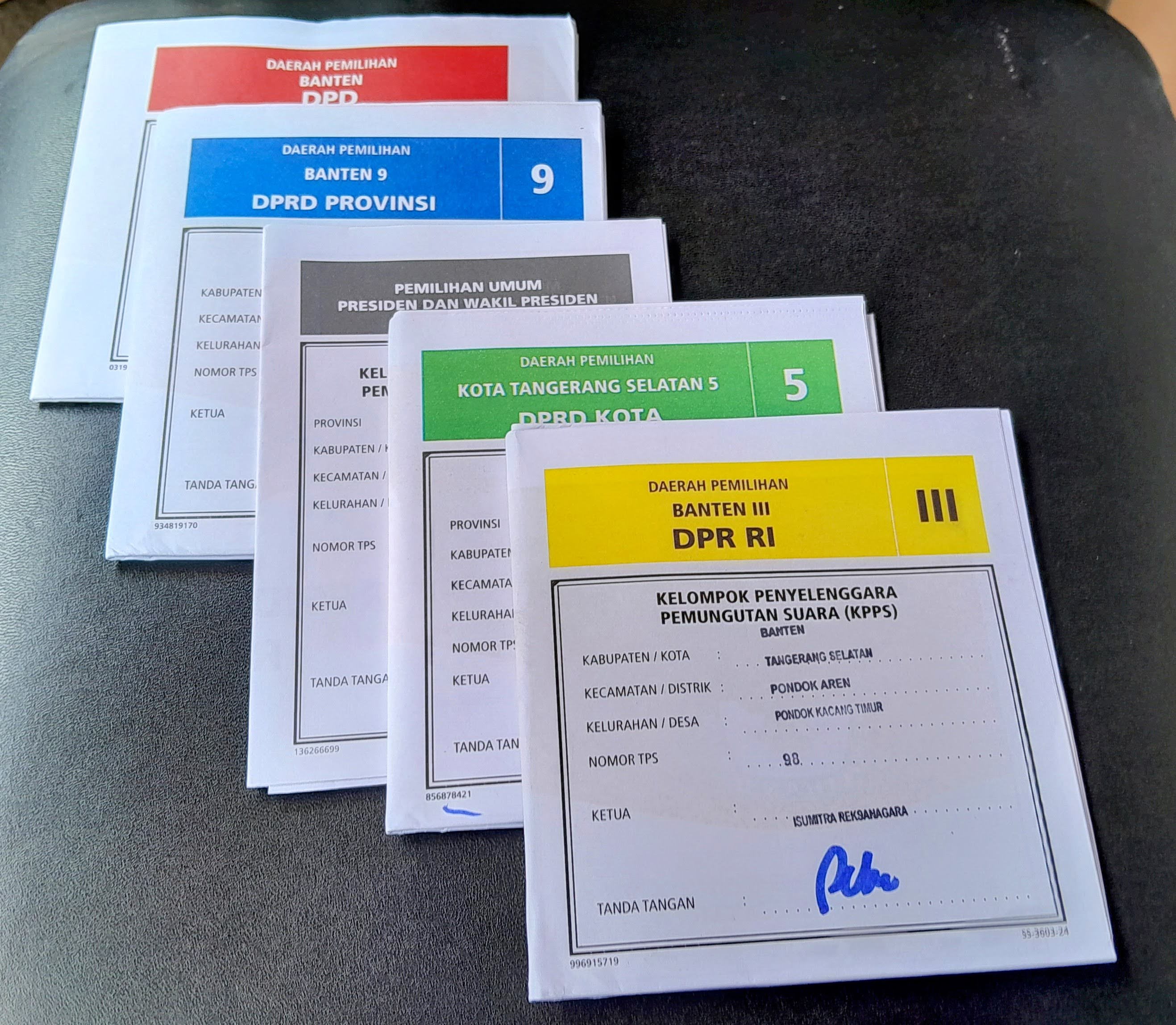
Ballot papers for the election in South Tangerang, Banten

All voters were given five ballot papers: one for president and vice president, one for the House of Representatives (DPR), one for the Regional Representative Council (DPD), one for the Provincial Regional House of Representatives (DPRD Provinsi), and one for the Municipal Regional House of Representatives (DPRD Kota/Kabupaten). Voters in Jakarta received just four ballot papers, while overseas voters received just two. Voters used a nail to poke a hole in the ballot paper indicating which party or candidate they wished to vote for, and then dipped their fingers in ink as a precaution against voter fraud.

=== Presidential ===
In order to run as a presidential candidate, a candidate had to be formally endorsed by a political party or a coalition thereof holding a minimum of 20 percent of seats in the DPR or having won at least 25 percent of the popular vote in the previous election, i.e. in the 2019 election.

The voting procedure followed a two-round system, with voters simply choosing one of the candidate pairs. A winning candidate required a majority and at least 20% of the votes in over half of Indonesia's provinces to be declared the winner. If no candidate pairs had fulfilled the criterion (50%+1 of total popular votes), the election would have had to progress to a second round with only the two candidates receiving the most popular votes, which would have been held on 26 June.

According to the Indonesian electoral law of 2017 and by the decision of the Constitutional Court of Indonesia number 90/PUU-XII/2023, presidential candidates have to:

- Be at least 40 years old or have/are currently holding positions that are elected through general elections, including regional head elections
- Have been resident in Indonesia for at least 5 years; and
- Not have held foreign citizenship, either at the time of the election or at any time before.

=== Legislative ===
Members of both the House of Representatives (DPR) and the Regional House of Representatives (DPRD) were elected from multi-member electoral districts through voting with an open list system, and seat distribution is done with the Sainte-Laguë method. There was a gender quota requiring at least 30% of registered candidates to be female.

A 4% parliamentary threshold is set for parties to be represented in the DPR, though candidates could still win seats in the regional councils provided they won sufficient votes. There were 580 DPR seats contested. Nationally, there are 84 national electoral districts, with 301 provincial and 2,375 municipal electoral districts. Senatorial candidates for the DPD were not allowed to be members of any political party. Four senators were elected for each province – a total of 152 members from all 38 provinces.

These were the first elections for provincial deputies and representatives of both Houses for Central Papua, Southwest Papua, South Papua, and Highland Papua - all new provinces formed in 2022. On 12 December 2022, Government Regulation in Lieu of Law No. 1/2022 was signed and published to amend the 2017 electoral law to make the new electoral regions to those provinces and facilitate the election there.

Nusantara, the designated new national capital, was not a new separate electoral region in the 2024 general elections as it is still under construction and therefore had an insufficient population for it to have its electoral district. Therefore, the government decided that the DPR will serve as a temporary representation body until 2029 when Nusantara can be established as a new electoral region. For the 2024 election, electors living within Nusantara were included in the East Kalimantan electoral region.

== Voters ==
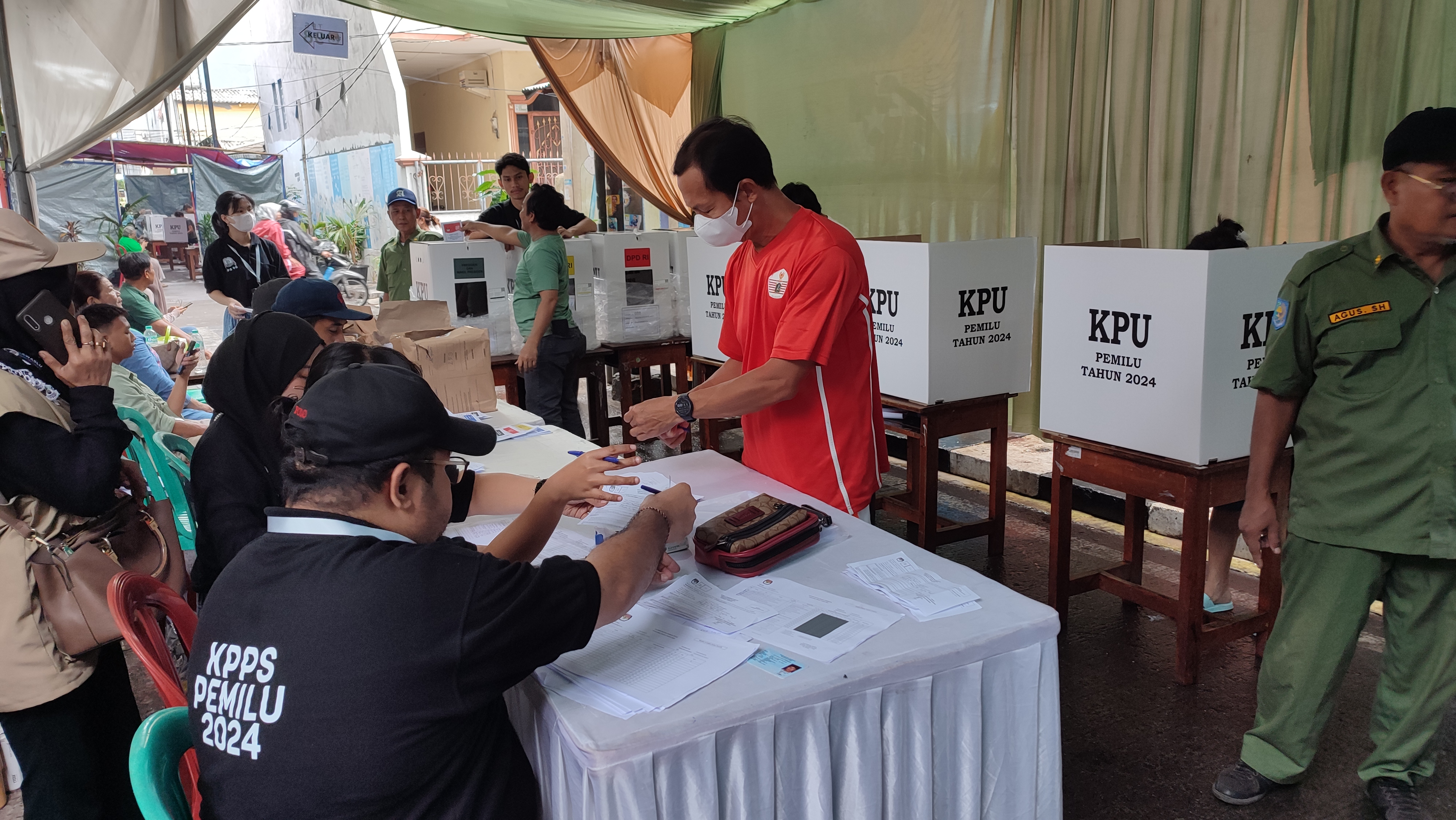
A polling station in North Jakarta on election day

The voting age is 17, or less if the voter has an Indonesian biometric identity card or e-KTP through marriage. However, since the age of marriage was amended to age 19 in 2019, there are no longer any married people under the age of 17. Members of the Indonesian National Armed Forces (TNI) and the Indonesian Police (Polri) are not allowed to vote. Around 33 percent of voters were Millennials, and 23 percent were part of Generation Z.

On 18 April 2023, the KPU announced that there were provisionally 205,853,818 registered voters, including 1,574,737 voters registered overseas. It was planned that the vote would be held in 823,287 polling stations (TPS). This was updated to a "final" figure of 204,807,222 voters in July 2023, who were to vote in 823,220 polling stations.

Postal ballots were sent to Indonesian embassies overseas in early January 2024. Although overseas voters cast their votes before voters in Indonesia, the KPU explicitly banned any exit polls or publication of results from overseas voting before the election process had been completed across Indonesia.

Voting occurred between 7:00 and 13:00 local time, although voters who had arrived before 13:00 and were still in the queue were allowed to cast their votes after the deadline.

== Contesting parties ==
To participate in the election, political parties had to have branches in every province in Indonesia, 75% of regencies or cities in those provinces, and 50% of districts in regencies where the party have branches. In April 2022, the Ministry of Law and Human Rights declared the names of 75 national political parties eligible to register for the 2024 elections. In the end, a total of 24 political parties registered with the KPU to run in the election nationally. On 14 December 2022, the KPU announced that 17 parties would be eligible to contest the legislative election.

The Ummah Party, who the KPU deemed not qualified to participate in the elections, accused the KPU of irregularities in the process. The party subsequently filed a written complaint. Following mediations brokered by Bawaslu between the party and the KPU on 20 and 21 December, Bawaslu instructed the electoral commission to repeat the verification process for Ummah Party. The party declared as qualified to participate in the election on 30 December.

Meanwhile, the Just and Prosperous People's Party (PRIMA), which registration was initially rejected, filed a lawsuit against KPU, and won the right for a second verification from the KPU. However, on 19 April 2023, the KPU deemed PRIMA not qualified to participate in 2024 elections after the party failed in its factual verification phase, where the KPU found the party's membership numbers below the required threshold. The Indonesian Justice and Unity Party and Berkarya Party also failed to qualify for the election, despite participating in 2019 and having previously had party members elected as members of regional legislatures then.

#	English name Indonesian name		Leader	2019 result	
#	English name Indonesian name		Leader	Votes (%)	Seats
1	PKB	National Awakening Party; Partai Kebangkitan Bangsa	Muhaimin Iskandar	9.69%	58 / 575
2	Gerindra	Great Indonesia Movement Party; Partai Gerakan Indonesia Raya	Prabowo Subianto	12.57%	78 / 575
3	PDI-P	Indonesian Democratic Party of Struggle; Partai Demokrasi Indonesia Perjuangan	Megawati Sukarnoputri	19.33%	128 / 575
4	Golkar	Party of Functional Groups; Partai Golongan Karya	Airlangga Hartarto	12.31%	85 / 575
5	NasDem	NasDem Party; Partai NasDem	Surya Paloh	9.05%	59 / 575
6	PB	Labour Party; Partai Buruh	Said Iqbal	New	
7	Gelora	Indonesian People's Wave Party; Partai Gelombang Rakyat Indonesia	Anis Matta	New	
8	PKS	Prosperous Justice Party; Partai Keadilan Sejahtera	Ahmad Syaikhu	8.21%	50 / 575
9	PKN	Nusantara Awakening Party; Partai Kebangkitan Nusantara	Anas Urbaningrum	New	
10	Hanura	People's Conscience Party; Partai Hati Nurani Rakyat	Oesman Sapta Odang	1.54%	0 / 575
11	Garuda	Change Indonesia Guardian Party; Partai Garda Perubahan Indonesia	Ahmad Ridha Sabana	0.50%	0 / 575
12	PAN	National Mandate Party; Partai Amanat Nasional	Zulkifli Hasan	6.84%	44 / 575
13	PBB	Crescent Star Party; Partai Bulan Bintang	Yusril Ihza Mahendra	0.79%	0 / 575
14	Demokrat	Democratic Party; Partai Demokrat	Agus Harimurti Yudhoyono	7.77%	54 / 575
15	PSI	Indonesian Solidarity Party; Partai Solidaritas Indonesia	Kaesang Pangarep	1.89%	0 / 575
16	Perindo	Indonesian Unity Party; Partai Persatuan Indonesia	Hary Tanoesoedibjo	2.67%	0 / 575
17	PPP	United Development Party; Partai Persatuan Pembangunan	Muhamad Mardiono	4.52%	19 / 575
Ballot number 18-23 allocated to local parties in Aceh
18	PNA	Aceh State Party; Partai Nanggroe Aceh	Irwandi Yusuf	DNP	
19	Gabthat	Aceh's Generation Unite in Obedience and Piety Party; Partai Generasi Atjeh Beusaboh Tha'at dan Taqwa	Ahmad Tajuddin	DNP	
20	PDA	Aceh Abode Party; Partai Darul Aceh	Muhibbussabri A. Wahab	DNP	
21	PA	Aceh Party; Partai Aceh	Muzakir Manaf	DNP	
22	PAS Aceh	Aceh Just and Prosperous Party; Partai Adil Sejahtera Aceh	Tu Bulqaini Tanjongan	DNP	
23	SIRA	Independent Solidity of Acehnese Party; Partai Soliditas Independen Rakyat Aceh	Muslim Syamsuddin	DNP	
24	Ummat	Ummah Party; Partai Ummat	Ridho Rahmadi	New	

== Presidential election ==
=== Candidates ===
In July 2017, the House of Representatives passed a law that only parties or coalitions with at least 20% of seats in the legislature (i.e. 115 seats), or 25% of votes in the previous election are eligible to submit a presidential candidate. Requirements for presidential/vice-presidential candidates are, Indonesian-born citizens, Indonesian citizens who were born abroad, a minimum age of 40 and a requirement to "have a belief in the One and Only God." If the candidates had spouses, they also had to be Indonesian citizens. A criminal record resulting in over five years of incarceration or an active bankruptcy bars a candidate from running.

The Anies Baswedan–Muhaimin Iskandar and Ganjar Pranowo–Mahfud MD pairs officially registered with the General Elections Commission on 19 October 2023. The Prabowo Subianto–Gibran Rakabuming pair officially registered on 25 October 2023.

==== Nominees ====
1
2024 Coalition of Change ticket
Anies Baswedan	Muhaimin Iskandar
for President	for Vice President
Governor of Jakarta (2017–2022)	Deputy Speaker of the House of Representatives (2019–2024)
Campaign

2
2024 Advanced Indonesia Coalition ticket
Prabowo Subianto	Gibran Rakabuming
for President	for Vice President
Minister of Defense (2019–2024); 2019 presidential nominee	Mayor of Surakarta (2021–2024)
Campaign

3
2024 Alliance of Parties ticket
Ganjar Pranowo	Mahfud MD
for President	for Vice President
Governor of Central Java (2013–2023)	Coordinating Minister for Political, Legal, and Security Affairs (2019–2024)
Campaign

==== Withdrawn support ====
The National Awakening Party had previously declared support for Prabowo Subianto but later rescinded their support and declared support for Anies Baswedan with the National Awakening Party's Chairman, Muhaimin Iskandar, being selected as Anies Baswedan's running mate.

Demokrat had previously declared support for Anies Baswedan, but due to the selection of Muhaimin Iskandar as Anies Baswedan's running mate, Demokrat Party's Chairman Agus Harimurti Yudhoyono rescinded their support and then declared support for Prabowo Subianto.

The Indonesian Solidarity Party had previously declared their support for Ganjar Pranowo but rescinded support and officially declared support for Prabowo Subianto on 24 October 2023.

==== Gibran's candidacy ====
An October 2023 ruling by the Constitutional Court of Indonesia added an exception to the 40-year minimum age criteria, allowing those younger than 40 who had been previously elected as regional leaders to run as presidential or vice-presidential candidates. This allowed 36-year-old Gibran Rakabuming, son of incumbent president Jokowi and mayor of Surakarta, to run for the vice-presidency. The ruling was controversial as the court chief justice, Anwar Usman, is Gibran's uncle. Anwar Usman was ultimately demoted by the Majelis Kehormatan Mahkamah Konstitusi or the Honorary Council of the Constitutional Court from the position of Chief Justice on 8 November after finding him guilty of conflict of interest on the ruling. Furthermore, the KPU was found to have committed ethics violations surrounding Gibran's vice presidential registration for allowing him to register his candidacy before the commission had adjusted the age minimum for candidates in its internal regulation. A lawsuit was filed by the Indonesian Democracy Defenders (TPDI) and the Indonesian Advocates Movement (Perekat Nusantara) against Joko Widodo, Gibran Rakabuming, Anwar Usman and First Lady Iriana alleging nepotism and political dynasty on the part of the respondents, but was dismissed by the Jakarta State Administrative Court a day before the election.

=== Debates ===
Five concurrent televised presidential and vice presidential debates were held between 12 December 2023 and 4 February 2024. During the debate on 21 January, Gibran Rakabuming was seen making a "ducking" gesture and pretending to search for a lost item in response to an answer from Mahfud MD, which drew mostly negative reactions online for its supposed rudeness.

=== Social media usage and disinformation ===
Parts of this article are copied directly from 2024 Indonesian presidential election

Prabowo Subianto's campaign was noted for its efforts at rehabilitating his image from his association with human rights violations during the dictatorship of former President Suharto into a "gemoy" (cuddly) grandfather figure among the youth, going as far as to make an animated avatar of him on TikTok using artificial intelligence. Anies Baswedan's and Ganjar Pranowo's campaign also used interactive AI chatbots to engage with voters.

During the campaign, Anies Baswedan was targeted by a deepfake audio recording purportedly showing him being chastised by a political backer in January. Prabowo Subianto's campaign team used AI to depict children in a television commercial in order to bypass laws prohibiting the appearance of minors in electoral advertisements.

Golkar, one of the parties supporting Prabowo for president, uploaded a viral AI-generated deepfake video on social media of a simulation of Suharto, who had died in 2008, in which he appeared to urge voters to select the party's candidates in the upcoming election. This led some civil society organizations to urge the KPU to implement regulations on the usage of artificial intelligence.

=== Allegations of state support ===
On 12 February 2024, investigative journalist Dandhy Laksono released a documentary on YouTube directed by him, titled Dirty Vote, alleging that Joko Widodo used state funds to support Prabowo Subianto's campaign, becoming viral within the day and prompting accusations of sabotage by Prabowo's campaign team. The presidential office denied the claims, while protests were held in reaction to the allegations.

== Legislative election ==
=== Contested seats ===
Legislative elections in Indonesia: February 2024
Level	Institution	Seats contested	Change from 2019 elections	Candidates running
National; Nasional	House of Representatives; Dewan Perwakilan Rakyat (DPR)	580	▲5	9,917
National; Nasional	Regional Representative Council; Dewan Perwakilan Daerah (DPD)	152	▲16 (Note: Due to the formation of four new provinces in Western New Guinea: Central Papua, Highland Papua, South Papua, and Southwest Papua.)	668
Provincial; Provinsi	Provincial Regional House of Representatives; Dewan Perwakilan Rakyat Daerah Provinsi (DPRD I)	2,372	▲165	32,880
Regency/Municipal; Kabupaten/Kota	Regency/City Regional House of Representatives; Dewan Perwakilian Rakyat Daerah Kabupaten/Kota (DPRD II)	17,510	▲170 (Note: Due to population changes, 42 municipalities increased the size of their legislatures by 5, while 8 decreased theirs by 5.)	214,915
Total		20,614	▲356	258,380

=== Candidates ===
All legislative candidates have to be Indonesian citizens, over 21 years old, senior high school (or equivalent) graduates, and have never been convicted for a crime resulting in a sentence of five years or more. In addition, the candidates for the DPR or local legislatures has to be endorsed by a political party and are required to resign from their non-legislative government offices – except for the president and vice president – or their state-owned company positions. Legislators running for reelection or another body through a new political party are also required to resign. For each electoral district, political parties are required to have at least 30 percent of running candidates, rounded to the closest whole number, be women. This was changed from the regulations in effect in the 2019 election, where the 30 percent figure would be rounded up, and thus less women candidates overall would be required.

Candidate registration was opened between 1–14 May 2023, with a total of 10,341 candidates registering to run for the DPR. This included 17 of the 18 national parties registering a maximum of 580 candidates allowed each, with only the Gelora Party registering less with 481 candidates. A total of 9,917 candidates were recognized by the KPU as DPR candidates. Approximately 1,100 individuals registered as candidates for the Regional Representative Council, with only 622 passing requirements.

== Opinion polls ==
=== President ===
Quick count Real count

Pollster	Fieldwork date	Sample size	Margin of error			
Pollster	Fieldwork date	Sample size	Margin of error	Prabowo Gerindra	Anies Independent	Ganjar PDI-P
14 February 2024	Election results			58.59%	24.95%	16.47%
Litbang Kompas	14 February 2024			58.45%	25.25%	16.30%
Charta Politika	14 February 2024			57.99%	25.36%	16.64%
SMRC	14 February 2024	1,994		58.36%	24.86%	16.78%
Lembaga Survei Indonesia	14 February 2024		1%	57.46%	25.30%	17.23%
Indikator	14 February 2024	3,000	0.52%	58.17%	25.38%	16.46%
LSI Denny JA	14 February 2024			58.47%	24.98%	16.55%
Poltracking	14 February 2024	3,000	1%	58.51%	25.13%	16.36%
Populi Center	14 February 2024		0.16%	59.08%	25.06%	15.86%
CSIS - Cyrus Network	14 February 2024	2,000	1%	58.22%	24.94%	16.84%
Politika Research & Consulting	14 February 2024			59.22%	24.07%	16.71%
SPIN	5 - 8 February 2024	1,200	2.8%	54.8%	24.3%	16.1%
LSI Denny JA	26 January - 6 February 2024	1,200	2.9%	53.5%	21.7%	19.2%
Lembaga Survei Indonesia	29 January - 5 February 2024	1,220	2.9%	51.9%	23.3%	20.3%
4 February 2024	Fifth presidential debate					
Indikator	28 January - 4 February 2024	1,200	2.9%	51.8%	24.1%	19.6%
Populi Center	27 January - 3 February 2024	1,500	2.53%	52.5%	22.1%	16.9%
Poltracking	25 January - 2 February 2024	1,220	2.9%	50.9%	25.1%	18.4%
Lembaga Point Indonesia	26 - 28 January 2024	1,500	2.53%	52.9%	22.7%	19.1%
Political Weather Station	21 - 25 January 2024	1,220	2.81%	52.3%	21.3%	19.7%
LSI Denny JA	16 - 26 January 2024	1,200	2.9%	50.7%	22%	19.7%
21 January 2024	Fourth presidential debate					
Polling Institute	15 - 16 January 2024	1,219	2.9%	48.7%	23%	20.9%
Indonesia Survey Center	11 - 19 January 2024	1,670	2.4%	52%	21.7%	18.1%
Indikator	10 - 16 January 2024	1,200	2.9%	48.6%	24.2%	21.6%
SPIN	8 - 14 January 2024	2,178	2.1%	50.9%	18.7%	23.5%
Lembaga Survei Indonesia	10 - 11 January 2024	1,206	2.9%	47.0%	23.2%	21.7%
Indonesia Polling Stations	7 - 13 January 2024	1,220	2.8%	51.8%	21.3%	19.2%
Charta Politika	4 - 11 January 2024	1,220	2.82%	42.2%	26.7%	28.0%
LSI Denny JA	3 - 11 January 2024	1,200	2.9%	46.6%	22.8%	24.8%
7 January 2024	Third presidential debate					
Indonesia Political Opinion	1 - 7 January 2024	1,200	2.5%	42.3%	34.5%	21.5%
Poltracking	1 - 7 January 2024	1,220	2.9%	46.7%	26.9%	20.6%
Indikator	30 December 2023 - 6 January 2024	1,200	2%	45,8%	25,5%	23%
Ipsos Public Affairs	27 December 2023 - 5 January 2024	2,000	2.19%	48.1%	21.8%	18.4%
Lembaga Survei Nasional	28 December 2023 - 2 January 2024	1,420	2.6%	49.5%	24.3%	20.5%
Median	23 December 2023 - 1 January 2024	1,500	2.53%	43.1%	26.8%	20.1%
Polling Institute	26 - 28 December 2023	1,246	2.9%	46.2%	24.6%	21.3%
PRC	20 - 27 December 2023	1,200	2.7%	42.4%	28.0%	21.8%
ICRC	20 - 26 December 2023	1,230	2.79%	39.4%	25.6%	29.1%
Indikator	23 - 24 December 2023	1,217	2.9%	46.7%	21.0%	24.5%
LSI Denny JA	17 - 23 December 2023	1,200	2.9%	43.3%	25.3%	22.9%
22 December 2023	Second presidential debate					
Polling Institute	15 - 19 December 2023	2,130	2.9%	46.1%	22.1%	20.5%
CSIS	13 - 18 December 2023	1,300	2.7%	43.7%	26.1%	19.4%
Puspoll	11 - 18 December 2023	1,220	2.83%	41%	26.1%	27.6%
12 December 2023	First presidential debate					
Indikator Publik	3 - 11 December 2023	1,670	2.4%	50.2%	22.7%	23.1%
Poltracking	29 November - 5 December 2023	1,220	2.9%	45.2%	23.1%	27.3%
Populi Center	28 November - 5 December 2023	1,200	2.83%	46.7%	21.7%	21.7%
Litbang Kompas	29 November - 4 December 2023	1,364	2.65%	39.3%	16.7%	15.3%
Indikator	23 November - 1 December 2023	1,200	2.9%	38.2%	19.1%	20.4%
LSI Denny JA	6 - 13 November 2023	1,200	2.90%	40.3%	20.3%	28.6%
Populi Center	29 October - 5 November 2023	1,200	2.83%	43.1%	22.3%	23.0%
Poltracking	28 October - 3 November 2023	1,220	2.9%	40.2%	24.4%	30.1%
Indikator	27 October - 1 November 2023	1,220	2.9%	39.7%	24.4%	30.0%
Charta Politika	26 - 31 October 2023	2,400	2.0%	34.7%	24.3%	36.8%
Indo Barometer	25 - 31 October 2023	1,230	2.79%	43.5%	23.2%	33.3%

=== Legislature ===
This graph shows the polling trends in the run-up to the 2024 Indonesian legislative election. Scenario polls are not included.

The electoral threshold to obtain seats is currently set at 4%.

== Finance and logistics ==
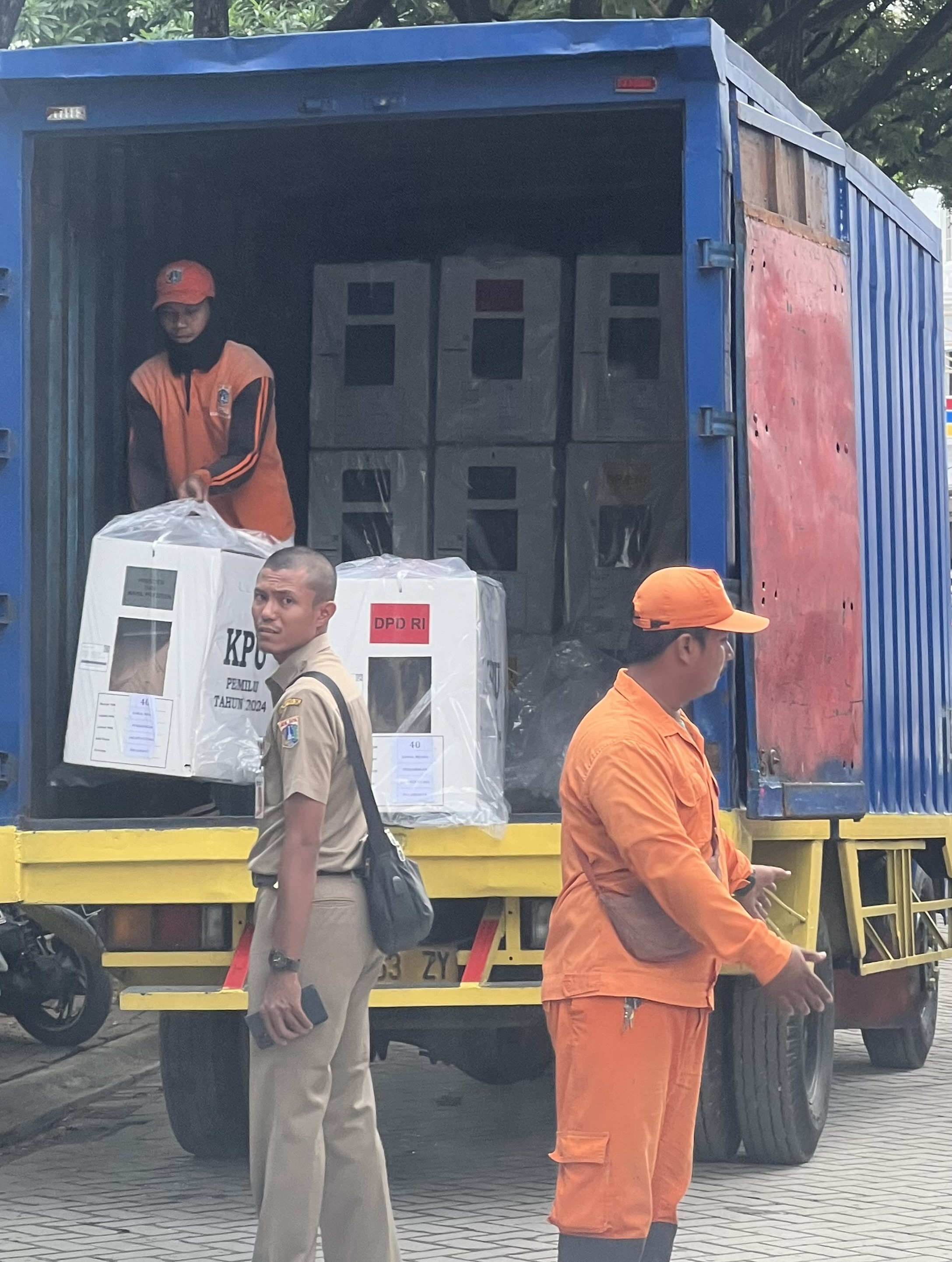
Workers unloading ballot boxes in Jakarta the day before the election.

The Indonesian Government budgeted Rp 25 trillion (~USD 1.7 billion) for the election preparations in 2022–2023, over half of which was used by the General Elections Commission (KPU) and most of the remaining funds used by the General Election Supervisory Agency. The Ministry of Finance budgeted Rp 71.3 trillion for the whole election process, a 57 percent increase from the 2019 election's budget. Around Rp 17 trillion (US$1.1 billion) of the budget is earmarked for presidential election runoffs, if one is required.

Over 1.2 billion ballot papers were printed, along with 4.16 million ballot boxes. According to KPU chairman Hasyim Asyari, the costs of printing the legislative ballots alone was over Rp 800 billion. Ballots began to be printed in November 2023, with the distribution of ballots mostly beginning on 10 February 2024. Polling stations are intended to receive their ballots the day before voting, although more isolated regions began distribution earlier. To reach more isolated polling stations, helicopters, boats, and animal-drawn carts were employed. KPU intends for each polling station to serve a maximum of 300 voters, although regulations allow for a maximum of 500. According to Hasyim Asyari, this was due to the time constraints at each polling station. Each polling station has four voting booths.

Over 5.7 million poll workers and volunteers (Kelompok Penyelenggara Pemungut Suara/KPPS) served at the polling stations in Indonesia and abroad. Due to concerns over deaths of KPPS staff in the 2019 election, KPU added rules in 2024 limiting their age to between 17 and 55, in addition to providing proof of good health. Seven KPPS members are assigned to each polling station, with one serving as the head. KPPS staff are paid Rp 1.1 million to 1.2 million (~USD 70) for their work, double the payment received by KPPS staff in 2019. Vote counting at each polling station occurs between 14 and 15 February, with vote recapitulation being done between 15 February and 20 March at the village/subdistrict, district, and regency/city levels. Each pair of presidential candidates are also allowed a maximum of two witnesses for each polling station. The Indonesian National Police said that 4,992 personnel would be deployed to secure the counting of votes.

As Indonesia's territory stretches across three time zones, voting began at 7:00 am in each time zone and closed at 01:00 pm., beginning at 22:00 GMT (13 February) in Papua and ending at 06:00 GMT (14 February) in Sumatra.

=== Incidents ===
On 11 February, a mob in Paniai Regency, Central Papua, burned down a district office along with a number of ballots and ballot boxes over a KPU decision to relocate a polling station in the regency. On 12 February, the KPU ordered the postponement of voting in 108 polling stations in Demak Regency, Central Java, due to flooding from the Wulan River. On election day, voting was delayed by several hours in 34 polling stations in Jakarta due to flooding caused by a thunderstorm. Voting was also postponed in some polling stations in South Tangerang due to flooding. In total, 37,466 polling stations across the country began voting considerably after 07:00 am. In Western New Guinea, polls were not held in 1,297 polling stations in Central Papua, Highland Papua and Papua Provinces due to problems related to logistics and social tensions revolving around the local noken system, in which a designated representative casts votes on behalf of a group.

Voting was not held in one polling station in Cimahi as the ballot box delivered was found to be empty, while mixups of ballot papers were reported in other polling stations in the city. In Bogor Regency, Bawaslu confirmed that eight ballot papers had been rigged to select certain candidates before they could be distributed to voters. Bawaslu also confirmed that ballot tampering had occurred during overseas voting in Malaysia. Migrant organizations in Malaysia also reported that ballots were being bought for between 25 and 50 ringgit (between US$5–10). Bawaslu recorded around 1,200 electoral violations during the vote, mostly from ethical infractions and neutrality violations by government employees.

Since 14 February, at least 57 election officers across the country have died from fatigue and work-related accidents and diseases during the counting of ballots. Intimidation against election officers was reported in 1,473 polling stations, while 6,084 polling stations received mixed up ballots.

During the vote-counting, allegations emerged of votes appearing larger on the KPU-generated online application Sirekap (Recapitulation Information System) than what the actual results showed. Bawaslu attributed the issue to possible errors on part of the newly founded app, and welcomed an audit into Sirekap. The PDI-P announced its formal rejection of the use of Sirekap on 20 February. Citing problems and discrepancies with Sirekap, the KPU ordered delays in the recapitulation of votes at the district level.

== Results ==
=== President ===
Map of the vote share of every candidates in each districts using a continuous colour scheme

Map of the vote share of every candidates among overseas voters using a continuous colour scheme

Candidate	Running mate	Party	Votes	%
Prabowo Subianto	Gibran Rakabuming	Gerindra Party	96,214,691	58.59
Anies Baswedan	Muhaimin Iskandar	Independent	40,971,906	24.95
Ganjar Pranowo	Mahfud MD	Indonesian Democratic Party of Struggle	27,040,878	16.47
Total			164,227,475	100.00
Valid votes			164,227,475	97.51
Invalid/blank votes			4,194,536	2.49
Total votes			168,422,011	100.00
Registered voters/turnout			204,422,181	82.39
Source: KPU Turnout

==== By province ====
Region	Province							Total valid votes
Region	Province	Anies Baswedan Independent		Prabowo Subianto Gerindra		Ganjar Pranowo PDI-P		Total valid votes
Region	Province	Votes	%	Votes	%	Votes	%	Total valid votes
Sumatra	Aceh	2,369,534	73.56	787,024	24.43	64,677	2.01	3,221,235
Sumatra	North Sumatra	2,339,620	29.25	4,660,408	58.26	999,528	12.49	7,999,556
Sumatra	West Sumatra	1,744,042	56.53	1,217,314	39.45	124,044	4.02	3,085,400
Sumatra	Riau	1,400,093	37.96	1,931,113	52.35	357,298	9.69	3,688,504
Sumatra	Jambi	532,605	24.15	1,438,952	65.23	234,251	10.62	2,205,808
Sumatra	South Sumatra	997,299	18.98	3,649,651	69.47	606,681	11.55	5,253,631
Sumatra	Bengkulu	229,681	18.10	893,499	70.43	145,570	11.47	1,268,750
Sumatra	Lampung	791,892	15.49	3,554,310	69.55	764,486	14.96	5,110,688
Sumatra	Bangka Belitung	204,348	23.08	529,883	59.85	151,109	17.07	885,340
Sumatra	Riau Islands	370,671	32.15	641,388	55.64	140,733	12.21	1,152,792
Java	Banten	2,451,383	34.02	4,035,052	55.99	720,275	9.99	7,206,710
Java	Jakarta	2,653,762	41.07	2,692,011	41.67	1,115,138	17.26	6,460,911
Java	West Java	9,099,674	31.68	16,805,854	58.50	2,820,995	9.82	28,726,523
Java	Central Java	2,866,373	12.58	12,096,454	53.07	7,827,335	34.35	22,790,162
Java	Yogyakarta	496,280	19.80	1,269,265	50.63	741,220	29.57	2,506,765
Java	East Java	4,492,652	17.52	16,716,603	65.19	4,434,805	17.29	25,644,060
Kalimantan	West Kalimantan	718,641	22.34	1,964,183	61.05	534,450	16.61	3,217,274
Kalimantan	Central Kalimantan	256,811	16.98	1,097,070	72.52	158,788	10.50	1,512,669
Kalimantan	South Kalimantan	849,948	35.16	1,407,684	58.23	159,950	6.61	2,417,582
Kalimantan	East Kalimantan	448,046	20.09	1,542,346	69.15	240,143	10.76	2,230,535
Kalimantan	North Kalimantan	72,065	17.67	284,209	69.71	51,451	12.62	407,725
Lesser Sunda	Bali	99,233	3.70	1,454,640	54.26	1,127,134	42.04	2,681,007
Lesser Sunda	West Nusa Tenggara	850,539	26.20	2,154,843	66.37	241,106	7.43	3,246,488
Lesser Sunda	East Nusa Tenggara	153,446	5.27	1,798,753	61.80	958,505	32.93	2,910,704
Sulawesi	North Sulawesi	119,103	7.30	1,229,069	75.31	283,796	17.39	1,631,968
Sulawesi	Gorontalo	227,354	29.39	504,662	65.24	41,508	5.37	773,524
Sulawesi	Central Sulawesi	386,743	21.50	1,251,313	69.57	160,594	8.93	1,798,650
Sulawesi	Southeast Sulawesi	361,585	23.10	1,113,344	71.11	90,727	5.79	1,565,656
Sulawesi	West Sulawesi	223,153	27.23	533,757	65.14	62,514	7.63	819,424
Sulawesi	South Sulawesi	2,003,081	37.94	3,010,726	57.02	265,948	5.04	5,279,755
Maluku	Maluku	228,557	21.16	665,371	61.59	186,395	17.25	1,080,323
Maluku	North Maluku	200,459	26.84	454,943	60.93	91,293	12.23	746,695
Papua	Papua	67,592	10.81	378,908	60.62	178,534	28.57	625,034
Papua	West Papua	37,459	11.32	172,965	52.26	120,565	36.42	330,989
Papua	Southwest Papua	48,405	13.53	209,403	58.54	99,899	27.93	357,707
Papua	Central Papua	128,577	11.66	638,616	57.94	335,089	30.40	1,102,282
Papua	Highland Papua	284,184	21.89	838,382	64.56	175,956	13.55	1,298,522
Papua	South Papua	41,906	13.31	162,852	51.74	110,003	34.95	314,761
Overseas		125,110	18.64	427,871	63.73	118,385	17.63	671,366
Total		40,971,906	24.95	96,214,691	58.59	27,040,878	16.47	164,227,475

==== By region ====
Region							Total valid votes
Region	Anies Baswedan Independent		Prabowo Subianto Gerindra		Ganjar Pranowo PDI-P		Total valid votes
Region	Votes	%	Votes	%	Votes	%	Total valid votes
Sumatra	10,979,785	32.42	19,303,542	56.99	3,588,377	10.59	33,871,704
Java	22,060,124	23.64	53,615,239	57.44	17,659,768	18.92	93,335,131
Kalimantan	2,345,511	23.97	6,295,492	64.33	1,144,782	11.70	9,785,785
Lesser Sunda	1,103,218	12.48	5,408,236	61.19	2,326,745	26.33	8,838,199
Sulawesi	3,321,019	27.98	7,642,871	64.39	905,087	7.63	11,868,977
Maluku	429,016	23.48	1,120,314	61.32	277,688	15.20	1,827,018
Papua	608,123	15.09	2,401,126	59.59	1,020,046	25.32	4,029,295
Overseas	125,110	18.64	427,871	63.73	118,385	17.63	671,366
Total	40,971,906	24.95	96,214,691	58.59	27,040,878	16.47	164,227,475

=== House of Representatives ===
Out of 580 elected members of the House of Representatives, 307 were incumbents and 273 were newcomers. This made 2024 the first election post-fall of Suharto to elect more incumbents than non-incumbents.

Party	Votes	%	+/–	Seats	+/–
Indonesian Democratic Party of Struggle	25,384,673	16.72	–2.61	110	–18
Golkar	23,208,488	15.29	+2.98	102	+17
Gerindra Party	20,071,345	13.22	+0.65	86	+8
National Awakening Party	16,115,358	10.62	+0.93	68	+10
NasDem Party	14,660,328	9.66	+0.61	69	+10
Prosperous Justice Party	12,781,241	8.42	+0.21	53	+3
Democratic Party	11,283,053	7.43	–0.34	44	–10
National Mandate Party	10,984,639	7.24	+0.40	48	+4
United Development Party	5,878,708	3.87	–0.65	0	–19
Indonesian Solidarity Party	4,260,108	2.81	+0.92	0	0
Perindo Party	1,955,131	1.29	–1.38	0	0
Gelora Party	1,282,000	0.84	New	0	New
People's Conscience Party	1,094,599	0.72	–0.82	0	0
Labour Party	972,898	0.64	New	0	New
Ummah Party	642,550	0.42	New	0	New
Crescent Star Party	484,487	0.32	–0.47	0	0
Garuda Party	406,884	0.27	–0.23	0	0
Nusantara Awakening Party	326,803	0.22	New	0	New
Total	151,793,293	100.00	–	580	+5
Valid votes	151,793,293	90.52			
Invalid/blank votes	15,891,240	9.48			
Total votes	167,684,533	100.00			
Registered voters/turnout	204,422,181	82.03			
Source: KPU, KPU, KPU

==== By province ====
38 provinces with a range of 3 to 91 seats in each

Province	Total	Seats won							
Province	Total	PDI-P	Golkar	Gerindra	NasDem	PKB	PKS	PAN	Demokrat
Aceh	13	1	3	1	2	2	2	1	1
North Sumatra	30	6	8	4	3	2	2	2	3
West Sumatra	14	1	2	2	3	1	2	2	1
Riau	13	2	3	2	0	2	2	1	1
Jambi	8	1	2	1	1	1	0	1	1
South Sumatra	17	2	3	3	2	2	2	1	2
Bengkulu	4	1	1	0	1	0	0	1	0
Lampung	20	3	3	4	2	2	2	2	2
Bangka Belitung	3	1	1	1	0	0	0	0	0
Riau Islands	4	1	1	1	1	0	0	0	0
Jakarta	21	4	2	3	1	2	5	3	1
West Java	91	11	17	16	8	13	12	8	6
Central Java	77	23	12	10	7	10	7	3	5
Yogyakarta	8	2	1	1	1	1	1	1	0
East Java	87	19	13	14	7	18	5	5	6
Banten	22	4	4	3	3	2	2	2	2
Bali	9	5	1	1	1	0	0	0	1
West Nusa Tenggara	11	1	1	1	2	2	2	1	1
East Nusa Tenggara	13	2	3	1	2	2	0	1	2
North Kalimantan	3	1	0	1	0	0	0	0	1
West Kalimantan	12	4	2	1	2	1	1	1	0
Central Kalimantan	6	1	1	1	1	0	0	1	1
South Kalimantan	11	0	3	2	2	0	1	3	0
East Kalimantan	8	1	2	1	1	1	1	1	0
North Sulawesi	6	2	1	1	1	0	0	0	1
Central Sulawesi	7	1	2	1	1	0	0	1	1
South Sulawesi	24	1	4	5	5	2	2	3	2
Southeast Sulawesi	6	1	1	1	1	1	0	0	1
Gorontalo	3	0	1	1	1	0	0	0	0
West Sulawesi	4	1	0	0	1	0	0	1	1
Maluku	4	1	0	1	0	0	1	1	0
North Maluku	3	1	1	0	0	0	1	0	0
Papua	3	1	0	1	1	0	0	0	0
West Papua	3	1	1	0	1	0	0	0	0
South Papua	3	1	0	0	1	1	0	0	0
Central Papua	3	1	1	0	1	0	0	0	0
Highland Papua	3	1	0	0	1	0	0	1	0
Southwest Papua	3	0	1	0	1	0	0	0	1
Total seats	580	110	102	86	69	68	53	48	44

==== By city/regency ====
===== 2024 vote share =====
Vote share by city/regency

Vote share by city/regency

Vote share by city/regency

Vote share by city/regency

Vote share by city/regency

Vote share by city/regency

Vote share by city/regency

Vote share by city/regency

Vote share by city/regency

Vote share by city/regency

Vote share by city/regency

Vote share by city/regency

Vote share by city/regency

Vote share by city/regency

Vote share by city/regency

Vote share by city/regency

Vote share by city/regency

Vote share by city/regency

===== Swing from 2019 =====
Swing from 2019 by city/regency

Swing from 2019 by city/regency

Swing from 2019 by city/regency

Swing from 2019 by city/regency

Swing from 2019 by city/regency

Swing from 2019 by city/regency

Swing from 2019 by city/regency

Swing from 2019 by city/regency

Swing from 2019 by city/regency

Swing from 2019 by city/regency

Swing from 2019 by city/regency

=== Regional Houses of Representatives ===
The table below lists political parties by number of seats and DPRD speakerships won. The speaker of a DPRD is chosen by the party with the most seats, and in the event of a tie, the most votes of the tied parties.

Party	DPRD I (Provinces)		DPRD II (Regencies and cities)	
Party	Seats	Speakers	Seats	Speakers
Indonesian Democratic Party of Struggle	389	12	2810	153
Golkar	365	14	2521	122
Gerindra Party	323	4	2120	43
NasDem Party	265	3	1849	54
National Awakening Party	220	1	1833	39
Prosperous Justice Party	210	2	1312	21
Democratic Party	206	0	1479	18
National Mandate Party	160	1	1236	27
United Development Party	83	0	850	11
People's Conscience Party	42	0	486	4
Indonesian Solidarity Party	33	0	149	2
Perindo Party	31	0	349	4
Crescent Star Party	12	0	164	2
Nusantara Awakening Party	4	0	52	0
Garuda Party	3	0	34	0
Gelora Party	1	0	72	0
Ummah Party	0	0	20	0
Labour Party	0	0	11	0
Aceh Party	20	1	116	7
Aceh Just and Prosperous Party	3	0	16	0
Nanggroe Aceh Party	1	0	21	1
Aceh Abode Party	1	0	7	0
Independent Solidity of the Acehnese Party	0	0	3	0
Total	2372	38	17510	508

==== Provincial legislatures ====
Provincial legislature (DPRD Provinsi) election results

Obtained the seat of speaker of the provincial legislature due to the most seats and popular votes

Province	PKB	Gerindra	PDIP	Golkar	NasDem	Buruh	Gelora	PKS	PKN	Hanura	Garuda	PAN	PBB	Demokrat	PSI	Perindo	PPP	PNA	Gabthat	PDA	PA	PASA	SIRA	Ummat	Total
Aceh	9	5	1	9	10	0	0	4	0	0	0	5	0	7	0	0	5	1	0	1	20	4	0	0	81
North Sumatra	4	13	21	22	12	0	0	10	0	5	0	6	0	5	0	1	1	Did not participate (Acehnese parties)						0	100
West Sumatra	3	10	3	9	9	0	0	10	0	0	0	8	0	8	0	0	5	Did not participate (Acehnese parties)						0	65
Riau	6	8	11	10	6	0	0	10	0	0	0	5	0	8	0	0	1	Did not participate (Acehnese parties)						0	65
Jambi	6	6	6	7	5	0	0	5	0	0	0	10	0	5	0	0	5	Did not participate (Acehnese parties)						0	55
Bengkulu	3	6	6	10	4	0	0	2	0	3	0	6	0	4	0	0	1	Did not participate (Acehnese parties)						0	45
South Sumatra	7	11	9	12	10	0	0	7	1	1	0	6	0	8	0	1	2	Did not participate (Acehnese parties)						0	75
Riau Islands	2	9	4	9	7	0	0	6	0	1	0	2	0	3	1	1	0	Did not participate (Acehnese parties)						0	45
Bangka Belitung	2	7	9	8	6	0	0	6	0	0	0	0	1	3	0	0	3	Did not participate (Acehnese parties)						0	45
Lampung	11	16	13	11	10	0	0	7	0	0	0	8	0	9	0	0	0	Did not participate (Acehnese parties)						0	85
Banten	10	14	14	14	10	0	0	13	0	0	0	7	0	11	3	0	4	Did not participate (Acehnese parties)						0	100
Jakarta	10	14	15	10	11	0	0	18	0	0	0	10	0	8	8	1	1	Did not participate (Acehnese parties)						0	106
West Java	15	20	17	19	8	0	0	19	0	0	0	7	0	8	1	0	6	Did not participate (Acehnese parties)						0	120
Central Java	20	17	33	17	3	0	0	11	0	0	0	4	0	7	2	0	6	Did not participate (Acehnese parties)						0	120
Yogyakarta	6	8	19	6	2	0	0	7	0	0	0	5	0	0	1	0	1	Did not participate (Acehnese parties)						0	55
East Java	27	21	21	15	10	0	0	5	0	0	0	5	0	11	1	0	4	Did not participate (Acehnese parties)						0	120
Bali	0	10	32	7	2	0	0	0	0	0	0	0	0	3	1	0	0	Did not participate (Acehnese parties)						0	55
NTB	6	10	4	10	4	0	0	8	0	1	0	4	2	6	0	3	7	Did not participate (Acehnese parties)						0	65
NTT	7	9	9	9	8	0	0	1	0	4	0	4	0	7	6	1	0	Did not participate (Acehnese parties)						0	65
West Kalimantan	5	9	13	9	10	0	0	2	0	4	0	5	0	6	0	0	2	Did not participate (Acehnese parties)						0	65
Central Kalimantan	4	6	10	8	5	0	0	1	0	0	0	4	0	6	0	1	0	Did not participate (Acehnese parties)						0	45
South Kalimantan	6	7	3	13	10	0	0	6	0	0	0	6	0	3	0	0	1	Did not participate (Acehnese parties)						0	55
East Kalimantan	6	10	9	15	3	0	0	4	0	0	0	4	0	2	0	0	2	Did not participate (Acehnese parties)						0	55
North Kalimantan	2	6	3	6	2	0	0	4	0	3	0	2	0	6	0	0	1	Did not participate (Acehnese parties)						0	35
South Sulawesi	8	13	6	14	17	0	0	7	0	1	0	4	0	7	0	0	8	Did not participate (Acehnese parties)						0	85
West Sulawesi	3	5	5	10	5	0	0	1	0	2	0	5	0	8	0	0	1	Did not participate (Acehnese parties)						0	45
Southeast Sulawesi	3	5	6	6	6	0	0	4	0	1	0	3	4	4	0	0	3	Did not participate (Acehnese parties)						0	45
Central Sulawesi	5	7	7	8	8	0	0	5	0	1	0	2	1	8	0	2	1	Did not participate (Acehnese parties)						0	55
Gorontalo	1	6	7	8	7	0	0	5	0	1	0	3	0	3	0	0	4	Did not participate (Acehnese parties)						0	45
North Sulawesi	1	4	19	6	6	0	0	1	0	0	0	0	0	6	1	1	0	Did not participate (Acehnese parties)						0	45
North Maluku	4	4	5	8	5	0	0	5	0	5	1	3	1	3	0	1	0	Did not participate (Acehnese parties)						0	45
Maluku	4	5	8	4	6	0	0	4	0	3	0	3	0	4	0	2	2	Did not participate (Acehnese parties)						0	45
West Papua	3	3	7	7	5	0	0	1	0	0	0	3	0	3	0	2	1	Did not participate (Acehnese parties)						0	35
Papua	3	3	7	10	7	0	0	3	0	0	0	3	0	3	2	3	1	Did not participate (Acehnese parties)						0	45
Central Papua	3	4	11	3	5	0	0	2	1	3	1	3	2	2	2	2	1	Did not participate (Acehnese parties)						0	45
Highland Papua	1	3	4	3	11	0	1	5	2	0	1	2	1	5	2	4	0	Did not participate (Acehnese parties)						0	45
Southwest Papua	1	3	5	8	4	0	0	1	0	3	0	1	0	5	1	3	0	Did not participate (Acehnese parties)						0	35
South Papua	3	5	7	4	6	0	0	3	0	0	0	1	0	1	1	2	2	Did not participate (Acehnese parties)						0	35
Total seats	220	323	389	365	265	0	1	210	4	42	3	160	12	206	33	31	83	1	0	1	20	3	0	0	2372

==== Municipal legislatures ====
Municipal legislature (DPRD Kabupaten/Kota) election results

Province	PKB	Gerindra	PDIP	Golkar	NasDem	Buruh	Gelora	PKS	PKN	Hanura	Garuda	PAN	PBB	Demokrat	PSI	Perindo	PPP	PNA	Gabthat	PDA	PA	PASA	SIRA	Ummat	Total
Aceh	53	59	8	89	69	0	3	48	0	21	1	57	7	59	0	0	27	21	0	7	116	16	3	1	665
North Sumatra	58	133	182	207	140	0	5	56	4	65	1	84	14	94	10	43	29	Did not participate (Acehnese parties)						0	1125
Bengkulu	19	32	29	39	33	0	2	17	0	11	0	35	4	17	0	21	16	Did not participate (Acehnese parties)						0	275
Jambi	34	41	40	52	44	0	0	27	3	4	0	57	1	32	0	8	32	Did not participate (Acehnese parties)						0	375
Riau	47	62	75	69	55	0	0	46	0	8	0	45	2	54	4	9	18	Did not participate (Acehnese parties)						1	495
West Sumatra	48	67	26	82	77	0	0	73	0	12	0	72	9	68	1	4	47	Did not participate (Acehnese parties)						4	590
South Sumatra	62	92	83	85	69	0	0	46	5	25	1	71	8	67	0	7	24	Did not participate (Acehnese parties)						0	645
Lampung	78	91	98	83	71	1	0	47	0	2	0	52	0	61	0	3	13	Did not participate (Acehnese parties)						0	600
Bangka Belitung	15	27	41	26	24	0	0	16	0	6	0	7	8	18	2	4	11	Did not participate (Acehnese parties)						0	205
Riau Islands	12	23	26	32	36	0	0	18	1	9	0	11	2	19	1	3	7	Did not participate (Acehnese parties)						0	200
Banten	39	50	46	67	40	0	1	48	0	0	0	23	0	39	8	1	28	Did not participate (Acehnese parties)						0	390
West Java	162	187	200	207	88	2	0	180	0	6	0	82	3	97	8	1	72	Did not participate (Acehnese parties)						0	1295
Central Java	265	193	444	194	75	0	1	138	0	22	0	68	0	89	10	3	108	Did not participate (Acehnese parties)						0	1610
Yogyakarta	27	28	57	28	16	0	0	27	0	0	0	20	0	5	0	0	11	Did not participate (Acehnese parties)						1	220
East Java	337	218	307	215	134	0	5	103	0	27	0	74	11	144	11	7	101	Did not participate (Acehnese parties)						1	1695
Bali	3	47	191	60	17	0	1	0	0	6	0	0	0	26	4	3	2	Did not participate (Acehnese parties)						0	360
West Nusa Tenggara	33	46	27	52	43	0	9	41	0	9	0	34	10	34	0	11	35	Did not participate (Acehnese parties)						1	385
East Nusa Tenggara	76	73	82	80	87	0	4	14	1	45	2	48	3	58	28	45	4	Did not participate (Acehnese parties)						0	650
West Kalimantan	39	67	85	68	68	0	2	27	0	29	0	47	0	51	3	8	16	Did not participate (Acehnese parties)						0	510
Central Kalimantan	37	48	80	66	36	0	0	10	0	10	0	27	1	34	3	16	17	Did not participate (Acehnese parties)						0	385
South Kalimantan	44	58	46	80	48	0	2	41	0	2	0	46	3	28	0	0	32	Did not participate (Acehnese parties)						0	430
East Kalimantan	32	47	47	69	36	0	4	27	0	8	0	18	1	27	0	3	11	Did not participate (Acehnese parties)						0	330
North Kalimantan	9	14	13	14	11	0	0	11	0	15	0	9	1	19	2	1	6	Did not participate (Acehnese parties)						0	125
South Sulawesi	69	102	58	138	142	0	10	58	0	20	0	74	3	69	2	10	69	Did not participate (Acehnese parties)						1	825
West Sulawesi	14	16	19	27	23	0	2	8	1	7	0	15	1	24	1	3	9	Did not participate (Acehnese parties)						0	170
Southeast Sulawesi	36	48	74	58	59	0	0	33	5	16	0	36	20	37	1	5	12	Did not participate (Acehnese parties)						0	440
Central Sulawesi	33	48	42	59	55	0	0	25	0	17	0	19	12	40	2	20	8	Did not participate (Acehnese parties)						0	380
Gorontalo	6	22	20	34	30	0	2	9	0	6	0	10	0	11	0	1	19	Did not participate (Acehnese parties)						0	170
North Sulawesi	17	38	153	61	46	0	0	6	0	5	0	5	1	38	3	19	8	Did not participate (Acehnese parties)						0	400
Maluku	31	26	38	27	35	1	1	25	4	16	0	20	2	22	8	18	16	Did not participate (Acehnese parties)						0	290
North Maluku	26	25	37	34	24	0	4	14	1	12	3	15	5	25	6	10	4	Did not participate (Acehnese parties)						0	245
Papua	17	15	24	33	24	1	6	11	5	11	1	12	6	14	8	13	11	Did not participate (Acehnese parties)						3	215
West Papua	9	20	21	18	17	1	0	9	0	5	2	12	3	5	5	13	9	Did not participate (Acehnese parties)						1	150
Southwest Papua	11	11	16	23	18	1	1	15	0	8	3	6	1	16	1	3	1	Did not participate (Acehnese parties)						0	135
Central Papua	12	19	27	20	16	1	3	9	9	14	7	12	11	11	9	16	10	Did not participate (Acehnese parties)						4	210
Highland Papua	13	16	28	13	29	3	3	21	13	6	12	8	9	21	6	15	2	Did not participate (Acehnese parties)						2	220
South Papua	10	11	20	12	14	0	1	8	0	1	1	5	2	6	2	2	5	Did not participate (Acehnese parties)						0	100
Total seats	1833	2120	2810	2521	1849	11	72	1312	52	486	34	1236	164	1479	149	349	850	21	0	7	116	16	3	20	17510

== Aftermath ==
Following the results of unofficial quick counts, Prabowo claimed victory on the evening of 14 February at an event with his supporters at Istora Senayan in Jakarta, calling it "the victory of all Indonesians." Gibran Rakabuming also expressed thanks to Prabowo for "giving young people a chance." Ganjar Pranowo's campaign team said that they were investigating reports of electoral violations and alleged "structural, systematic and massive fraud" during the voting. Hasto Kristiyanto, the secretary-general of the PDI-P, said that election irregularities were enforced from the top down, beginning with the decision to allow Gibran Rakabuming Raka to run for vice president. Hamdan Zoelva, former chief justice of the Constitutional Court and a member of Anies Baswedan's campaign team also said that there were "strong indications that violations occurred in a structured, systematic and massive way in the presidential election." Remarks by independent observers indicated there were "no signs of systemic fraud." Prabowo again expressed thanks to the electorate after the official confirmation of the election results on 20 March.

The Indonesia Stock Exchange on 15 February recorded its sharpest rise in two months as quick count results indicated Prabowo's victory, which analysts attributed to the removal of political uncertainty which would arise from a runoff election. Largest gains were made by banks, nickel companies, and infrastructure firms.

In total, the Constitutional Court received 297 lawsuits related to the results of the legislative election.

=== Protests ===
Following the allegations, police said that it would allow peaceful protests. A demonstration was held in front of the Istana Merdeka in Jakarta in protest against Prabowo's claims of victory on 15 February, followed by rallies on 16 February against alleged electoral fraud and Joko Widodo's perceived support for Prabowo at the KPU headquarters. Joko Widodo dismissed the allegations of fraud, saying that evidence for fraud should be brought to Bawaslu and the Constitutional Court. On the day the official election results were finally released on 20 March, 300 demonstrators protested alleged electoral fraud and Joko Widodo's support for Prabowo outside the KPU headquarters.

On 22 April, the Constitutional Court rejected all legal challenges against the results of the presidential election, allowing the KPU to declare the Prabowo-Gibran tandem the winner.

=== Analysis ===
After the release of quick count results, Lingkaran Survei Indonesia attributed split-ticket voters to the Ganjar-Mahfud pair's poor performance despite the PDI-P's success in remaining the largest party in the legislature. Notably, Prabowo won the most votes in the traditionally PDI-P supporting provinces of Central Java and Bali. Kompas' exit polls found strong support for Prabowo's candidacy from non-Muslim voters and Nahdlatul Ulama Muslims, winning in 36 of 38 provinces (except for Aceh and West Sumatra, where the Anies-Muhaimin pair received the most votes). Anies-Muhaimin and Ganjar-Mahfud were also defeated in East Java and Central Java, respectively, even though their supporting parties (PKB and PDI-P, respectively) won the most votes in the two provinces. Prabowo also won the most votes in Bali, a traditional PDI-P stronghold, a victory attributed by analysts and Prabowo's campaign team to Jokowi's endorsement.

Nahdlatul Ulama-affiliated academic Ulil Abshar Abdalla, in a Kompas column, attributed Prabowo's strong performance to Indonesian voters prioritizing the continuation of Jokowi's policies over concerns on legal and ethical violations. On the other hand, Ganjar's campaign was described by an ISEAS – Yusof Ishak Institute analysis as being left "without a clear campaign message or identity" following Jokowi's split from PDI-P. The same researchers noted Prabowo's success in changing his popular image from a strongman in prior elections to a "cuddly grandpa" through social media campaigns in order to appeal to younger generations, and attributed Anies' defeat to the small proportion of the electoral base who were opposed to Jokowi's policies.

Of parties which qualified for the House of Representatives in 2019, Golkar gained the most in 2024, increasing the party's vote share from 12 percent to over 15 percent. Parties supporting Ganjar Pranowo – PDI-P, PPP, Hanura and Perindo – saw their vote shares decline from 2019, with PPP failing to qualify for parliament for the first time since the party's first electoral participation in the 1977 election.

== Reactions ==
=== Domestic ===
Outgoing president Joko Widodo stated that he had met and congratulated Prabowo and his own son, Gibran, on the evening of 14 February, based on quick count results. Former president Susilo Bambang Yudhoyono congratulated Prabowo and stated that he "is now his commander".

Chairman of the NasDem Party Surya Paloh in a press conference said his party accepted the results of both legislative and presidential elections and congratulated all winners of the legislative election and the Prabowo-Gibran ticket. Despite this, Paloh states that NasDem will continue to support efforts to "seek justice" regarding the election results. NasDem will also file a lawsuit against the election results, including for the election of legislative members in six electoral districts, namely three electoral districts in Sumatra, one electoral district in Papua, and two electoral districts in Java. The Prosperous Justice Party (PKS) also accepted the results with party secretary general Aboe Bakar Alhabsy expressing his happiness on its electoral gain of 3 seats. However, PKS states that the legal process for the election is still ongoing, citing the problems of using the Sirekap.

Anies Baswedan and Muhaimin Iskandar said that "It is important to safeguard the election process to ensure legitimacy, trust and inclusiveness in the results". In an apparent criticism towards Gibran Rakabuming Raka's candidacy as vice president, Anies stated that "leaders born from a process tainted with fraud and irregularities will produce a regime that produces policies full of injustice" and his team did not want this to happen. They initially rejected the results of the presidential election announced by the KPU and protested the result to the Constitutional Court. On 22 April 2024 after hearing the ruling from the Constitutional Court, Anies declared that the election was over and congratulated Prabowo and Gibran for their victory in the election.

Ganjar Pranowo's campaign legal team deputy leader Todung Mulya Lubis also stated they would protest the results to the Constitutional Court and rejecting the results of the presidential election especially on the PDI-P's stronghold provinces of Central Java, Bali, North Sulawesi and East Nusa Tenggara. Despite this, Todung Mulya Lubis stated they were not in the position to reject the whole results and only wanted to "correct the errors". PDI-P's coalition partner PPP also rejected the election results, citing discrepancies between KPU's and the party's internal results. On 22 April 2024, following the ruling from the Constitutional Court, both Ganjar Pranowo and Mahfud MD accepted the election results and congratulated Prabowo and Gibran for their electoral victory.

Grand Imam of the Istiqlal Mosque Nasaruddin Umar congratulated Prabowo and Gibran on their victory in the election and expressed hope that Indonesia will be more developed and more successful under their leadership. Nahdlatul Ulama chief Yahya Cholil Staquf congratulated Prabowo-Gibran for winning the election and all parties that won seats in the legislative election. Muhammadiyah chief Haedar Nashir had also congratulated Prabowo-Gibran, hoping that the elected pair have the spirit of a statesman in carrying out the popular mandate.

Sultan and Governor of Yogyakarta Hamengkubuwono X congratulated Prabowo-Gibran for their electoral victory and expressed hope for their successful administration.

=== International ===
==== Asia ====
- Cambodia – Prime Minister Hun Manet congratulated Prabowo through a congratulatory message.
- China – Chinese Ambassador to Indonesia Lu Kang visited Prabowo's home on 18 February and personally congratulated him over the election results while expressing hope that "Indonesia and China can grow together, prosper together". On 20 March, President Xi Jinping delivered a congratulatory message to Prabowo for his victory and said that he looked forward to meet with him and work together with his administration. This letter was delivered by Chinese Ambassador to Indonesia Lu Kang. Foreign Minister Wang Yi congratulated Prabowo for his win during an official visit to the Ministry of Defense of Indonesia in Jakarta.
- East Timor – President José Ramos-Horta congratulated Prabowo through a phone call on 19 February. Prime Minister Xanana Gusmao congratulated Prabowo through a letter, hopeful that Prabowo's wisdom and experience will make him a great president and wished for stronger bilateral relationship and cooperation in areas of mutual interest.
- India – Prime Minister Narendra Modi congratulated the Indonesian people for the successful election and Prabowo for his victory on social media. Modi said he hoped to be able to work with the new president to strengthen the comprehensive strategic partnership between the two nation. Modi also sent a congratulatory letter to Prabowo which was delivered by Indian Ambassador to Indonesia Sandeep Chakravorty during his official visit to the Ministry of Defense of Indonesia on 8 May.
- Iran – President Ebrahim Raisi delivered a congratulatory message to Prabowo for being elected president based on the election results. He also stated his hope for both countries to have collaborative efforts, mutual understanding, and shared endeavours under Prabowo's presidency.
- Japan – Prime Minister Fumio Kishida delivered a congratulatory message to Prabowo and expressed his desire to encourage bilateral cooperation in handling regional and international situations.
- Jordan – King Abdullah II congratulated Prabowo through a phone call based on the projected results. He also stated that Prabowo was needed by Indonesia and expressed his readiness to receive him in Jordan.
- Malaysia – Prime Minister Anwar Ibrahim congratulated Prabowo for his victory in the election in a phone call and stated in his Twitter account that he was the first leader to congratulate him. He expressed belief that Prabowo can carry out the given mandate with excellence. On 4 April, Defense Minister Mohamed Khaled Nordin congratulated Prabowo during Prabowo's visit in Malaysia, expressing hopes that bilateral relationship between both nations can be brought into greater heights, especially when Malaysia is already familiar with Prabowo who was educated in Malaysia during his youth. Apart from that, Malaysia Deputy Prime Minister Ahmad Zahid Hamidi and former 9th Malaysian Prime Minister Ismail Sabri Yaakob also congratulated Prabowo as president-elect.
- Palestine – President Mahmoud Abbas delivered a congratulatory message to Prabowo on winning the presidential election and expressed the commitment to working together towards further development and cooperation. He also stated Palestine's appreciation for Indonesia's steadfast support for the Palestinian cause and its people. The message was delivered by the Embassy of Palestine in Jakarta.
- Philippines – President Bongbong Marcos congratulated Prabowo for his commanding lead in the latest electoral count to be president on social media. He also stated that he looked forward to deepening bilateral ties, especially in the upcoming celebration of 75 years of diplomatic relations between Indonesia and the Philippines.
- Saudi Arabia – King Salman of Saudi Arabia sent a cable of congratulations to Prabowo Subianto for winning the elections and wished him success. Prince Mohammed bin Salman also sent a cable to Prabowo expressing his congratulations.
- Singapore – President Tharman Shanmugaratnam congratulated Prabowo and stated that his strong mandate demonstrated the confidence and trust of the Indonesian people in his leadership. Prime Minister Lee Hsien Loong congratulated Prabowo for his apparent victory, and congratulated Jokowi for the "smooth and successful conduct" of the election. He also stated that he valued Prabowo's goodwill and friendship, and appreciated his insights. Foreign Minister Vivian Balakrishnan congratulated Prabowo on his electoral victory on behalf of the Singaporean government, calling Prabowo a steadfast friend of Singapore.
- South Korea – President Yoon Suk Yeol called Prabowo to congratulate him for winning the election. He also requested support for strengthening bilateral cooperation in various sectors and expressed hope for further efforts in spearheading freedom, peace and prosperity with Indonesia, considered one of South Korea's key partners in the Korea-ASEAN Solidarity Initiative (KASI).
- Sri Lanka – President Ranil Wickremesinghe congratulated Prabowo for his victory in the election through a phone call.
- Taiwan – President Tsai Ing-wen and Vice President Lai Ching-te congratulated Prabowo on his election victory through the Foreign Ministry. The ministry stated Indonesia and Taiwan shared the same democratic and liberal values and hoped to deepen bilateral ties with Indonesia under Prabowo.
- Thailand – Prime Minister Srettha Thavisin congratulated Prabowo for his victory on social media. He expressed hope to strengthen bilateral relations.
- Turkey – President Recep Tayyip Erdoğan delivered a congratulatory message to Prabowo following the election and expressed hope that the results will be auspicious. The message was delivered to Prabowo by Turkish Ambassador to Indonesia Talip Küçükcan. Erdoğan also called Prabowo personally to congratulate him for winning the election.
- United Arab Emirates – President Mohammed bin Zayed Al Nahyan congratulated Prabowo by phone call following the election results.
- Vietnam – Acting President Vo Thi Anh Xuan and Prime Minister Pham Minh Chinh cabled messages of congratulations to Prabowo Subianto upon his election as President of the Republic of Indonesia.

==== Australasia & Oceania ====
- Australia – Foreign Minister Penny Wong said that the Australian government was looking "forward to working closely with the next president" when he is inaugurated. Prime Minister Anthony Albanese called Prabowo on 15 February, tweeting that he was "the first foreign leader to speak today with Prabowo, who has a clear lead in official and unofficial counts". On 23 February, Deputy Prime Minister and Minister of Defense Richard Marles personally congratulated Prabowo during his official visit to the Ministry of Defense of Indonesia in Jakarta.
- New Zealand – Deputy Prime Minister and Foreign Minister Winston Peters congratulated Prabowo through his Twitter account and said he looked forward to strengthen comprehensive partnership between both nations.

==== Africa ====
- Tanzania - President Samia Suluhu Hassan congratulated Prabowo as the elected president of Indonesia in her Twitter account. She said that the results of the election is very important for Prabowo and Indonesia and the results is a proof of trust. She then expressed that Tanzania will continue to cooperate with Indonesia.

==== Europe ====
- Czech Republic – Prime Minister Petr Fiala congratulated Prabowo on social media and stated "readiness to strengthen bilateral relations".
- France – President Emmanuel Macron congratulated Prabowo through a phone call and expressed his hope to celebrate 75 years of diplomatic relations between France and Indonesia.
- Germany – Chancellor Olaf Scholz congratulated Prabowo for his victory and welcomed the opportunity to further developed the strategic partnership between Indonesia and Germany in peace and security, economic cooperation, and shared commitment against climate change.
- Hungary – Prime Minister Viktor Orban congratulated Prabowo for his victory and hoped for better bilateral relations between both nations. The letter was delivered to Prabowo by Hungarian Ambassador to Indonesia Lilla Karsay.
- Netherlands – Prime Minister Mark Rutte congratulated Prabowo following the projected outcome of the elections on social media. He also stated that he is looking forward to continuing to develop the friendship and strong bond between their countries.
- Russia – President Vladimir Putin congratulated Prabowo on his election win and expressed confidence that Prabowo's administration would contribute to the further development of relations between their countries and strengthening security and stability in the Asia-Pacific region.
- Serbia – President Aleksandar Vučić congratulated Prabowo through a phone call on 22 February.
- Spain – Prime Minister Pedro Sánchez delivered a congratulatory letter to Prabowo following the election results and expressed confidence in Prabowo's experience and good performance to lead Indonesia in the future. The letter was delivered to Prabowo by Spanish Ambassador to Indonesia Francisco de Asis Aguilera Aranda.
- Switzerland – President Viola Amherd delivered a congratulatory letter to Prabowo for his electoral victory as the eighth president of Indonesia. The letter was delivered by Swiss Ambassador to Indonesia Olivier Zehnder.
- Ukraine – President Volodymyr Zelenskyy congratulated Prabowo by phone call following the election results and invited him to an upcoming summit on Ukraine's peace formula in Switzerland in April.
- United Kingdom – Prime Minister Rishi Sunak delivered a congratulatory message to Prabowo on his electoral victory. The message was delivered to Prabowo's home by UK Ambassador to Indonesia Dominic Jermey. Jermey also congratulated "hundreds of thousands of candidates who campaigned across the archipelago" and hailed the election as "a truly epic festival of democracy". Foreign Minister and Former Prime Minister David Cameron congratulated Prabowo for his victory through his social media account, hoping to develop a genuine strategic partnership in the years ahead.

==== Americas ====
- Canada - Prime Minister Justin Trudeau called Prabowo to congratulate him on his victory in the election and applauded the Indonesian people for their strong turnout and continued commitment to democracy. Trudeau said he looked forward to further strengthening the partnership between Canada and Indonesia after Prabowo takes office and also thanked outgoing President Joko Widodo for his partnership and contributions. Prabowo also expressed his admiration of Trudeau's father, former Canadian Prime Minister Pierre Trudeau.
- Nicaragua – President Daniel Ortega and Vice President Rosario Murillo congratulated Prabowo and said they hoped to strengthen ties between both countries.
- United States – State Department spokesman Matthew Miller congratulated the Indonesian people "for their robust turnout" in the election, calling it "a testament to the durability and strength of the Indonesian people's commitment to the democratic process and electoral institutions". When asked why the White House had yet to congratulate Prabowo on his victory, US National Security Council Communications Advisor John Kirby said a statement would be released at an appropriate time and will respect the will of the Indonesian people. On 12 March, President Joe Biden delivered a congratulatory letter to Prabowo on his electoral victory which was delivered by US Ambassador to ASEAN Yohannes Abraham. He congratulated the Indonesian people for their successful election, calling it "a testament for commitment to democracy" and he looked forward to strengthening Indonesia–United States relations further. On 22 March, Biden personally called Prabowo to congratulate him for winning the election. Secretary of State Antony Blinken also congratulated Prabowo on his victory and said that he looked forward to partnering closely with the incoming government. Secretary of Defense Lloyd Austin congratulated Prabowo for his election victory via a phone call, reiterating he importance of maintaining the international rules and norms that preserve a free and open Indo-Pacific region.

Aside from Prabowo, Vice President-elect Gibran Rakabuming Raka also received words of congratulations from foreign government officials.
