= Garuda Party =

Political party in Indonesia

Change Indonesia Guardian Party Partai Garda Perubahan Indonesia
- General Chairman: Ahmad Ridha Sabana
- Secretary-General: Yohanna Murtika
- Founded: 30 November 2007; 18 years ago (founded as the National People's Party); 16 April 2015; 11 years ago (reorganized as Garuda)
- Split from: Golkar; Gerindra
- Headquarters: Jakarta
- Ideology: Pancasila; Secularism; Indonesian nationalism Egalitarianism
- Political position: Centre
- National affiliation: Advanced Indonesia Coalition
- Ballot number: 11
- DPR seats: 0 / 580
- DPRD I seats: 3 / 2,372
- DPRD II seats: 34 / 17,510

Website
- partaigaruda.org

The Change Indonesia Guardian Party (Indonesian: Partai Garda Perubahan Indonesia), better known as the Garuda Party, is a political party in Indonesia. The party has been linked to the family of former president Suharto. Officials have denied the party is linked to the Suharto family or to former general Prabowo Subianto's Gerindra Party. Garuda Party also support Prabowo in the 2024 presidential election.

Garuda Party declared itself to be neutral in the 2019 Indonesian presidential election April 2019 presidential election, although some of its officials and legislative candidates voiced support for Prabowo.

== Background ==
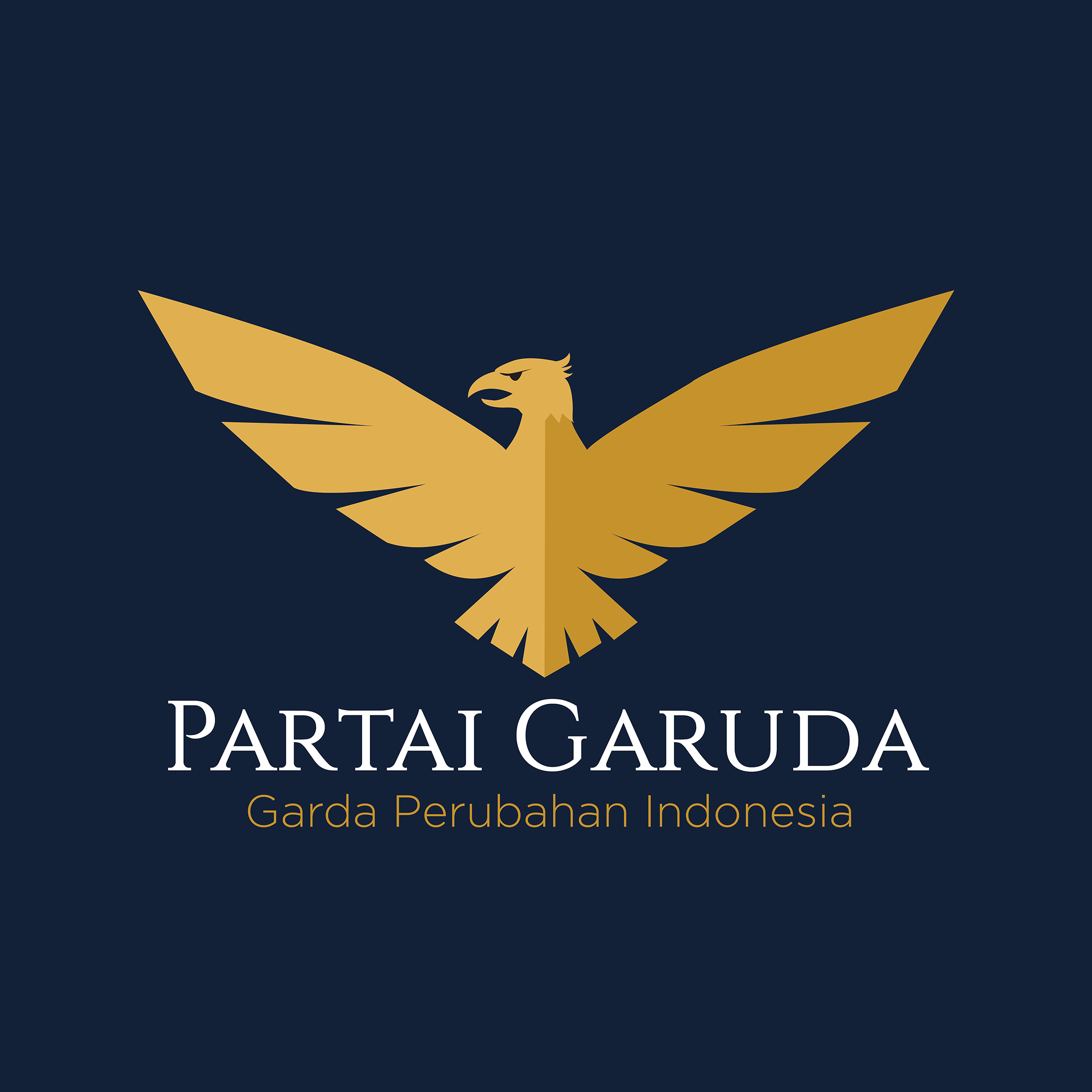
The party's logo from 2022 to 2025

In 2007, former information minister Harmoko, also a former chairman of Golkar, founded the National People’s Party (PKN), which failed to qualify for the 2009 general election. In April 2015, PKN was renamed the Change Indonesia Movement Party (Garuda). The party’s constitution, bylaws, symbol, and senior figures were all changed, making it unrecognizable from PKN.

Garuda Party was registered with the Ministry of Justice and Human Rights on 16 April 2015. The party espouses a nationalist platform.

Little was known of the party's leaders or policies prior to its registration for the 2019 election being accepted by the General Elections Commission (KPU) in October 2017. Party chairman Ahmad Ridha Sabana has said Garuda Party is a party of young people who want to contribute to national development.

According to KPU data, Garuda Party has 693,191 members across 509 of Indonesia's 514 regencies, and 36.36% of its members are women.

In its first election, the party gained just 0.5% of votes and did not qualify for the national House of Representatives. The party won one seat each in the provincial Regional Houses of Representatives of North Maluku and Papua. The largest number of 2019 elected municipal legislators from the party are in Papua province, before the province's split. In the 2024 election, the party still failed to qualify for the national parliament, while winning three provincial legislature and 34 municipal legislature seats, mostly in Maluku and Papua.

== Key personnel ==
- Chairman: Ahmad Ridha Sabana.
- Secretary General: Abdullah Mansuri. He is chairman of the Indonesian Market Traders Association (IKAPPI). He is the subject of several articles on cendananews.com, a news portal that reports on the activities of Suharto's children.

== Election results ==
=== Presidential election results ===
Election	Ballot number	Candidate	Running mate	1st round (Total votes)	Share of votes	Outcome	2nd round (Total votes)	Share of votes	Outcome
2019	Neutral	Neutral							
2024	2	Prabowo Subianto	Gibran Rakabuming Raka	96,214,691	58.59%	Elected			

=== Legislative election results ===
Election	Ballot number	Leader	Seats		Total votes	Share of votes	Outcome of election
Election	Ballot number	Leader	No.	±	Total votes	Share of votes	Outcome of election
2019	6	Ahmad Ridha Sabana	0 / 575		702,536	0.50%	Neutral
2024	11	Ahmad Ridha Sabana	0 / 580	0	406,884	0.27%	Governing coalition

Election results for Provincial Regional Houses of Representatives
Election	Province	Seats won	Status	Reference
2019	North Maluku	1 / 45		
2019	Papua	1 / 55	Joint parliamentary group with PKB and PPP	

Election results for Regency/City Regional Houses of Representatives
Election	Regency/City	Seats won	Status	Reference
2019	South Nias	3 / 35		
2019	Mentawai Islands	2 / 20		
2019	Bojonegoro	1 / 50	Joint parliamentary group with Nasdem and Perindo	
2019	Southeast Maluku	1 / 25		
2019	Biak Numfor	2 / 25		
2019	Dogiyai	1 / 25		
2019	Intan Jaya	2 / 25		
2019	Jayawijaya	1 / 30		
2019	Keerom	1 / 20		
2019	Lanny Jaya	2 / 25		
2019	Central Mamberamo	1 / 20		
2019	Mappi	2 / 25		
2019	Nabire	1 / 25		
2019	Nduga	3 / 25		
2019	Paniai	2 / 25		
2019	Sarmi	1 / 20		
2019	Supiori	1 / 20		
2019	Tolikara	1 / 30		
2019	Yalimo	3 / 25		
2019	Arfak Mountains	1 / 20		

== Controversies ==
Garuda Party chairman Ahmad Ridha Sabana in February 2018 denied media reports that the party was linked to Tutut Suharto. He said Garuda is independent and was “built by youths”. He admitted to working for Tutut in the past but said he was no longer president director of her TPI (now MNCTV) television network. He also denied his party was connected to Gerindra Party, although he acknowledged he had in 2014 stood as a Gerindra candidate for the Jakarta provincial legislative assembly. He also admitted his brother Ahmad Riza Patria was a Gerindra politician.

Ridha denied Garuda Party’s name and mythical garuda bird emblem were deliberately similar to Gerindra’s name and garuda bird logo. He also rejected claims that Garuda Party’s bird design resembles the Nazi party's eagle emblem.
