= Coalition of Change for Unity =

Political alliance in Indonesia (2023–2024)

Coalition of Change Koalisi Perubahan
- Abbreviation: KPP; KP
- Leader: Anies Baswedan
- Founder: Surya Paloh; Agus Harimurti Yudhoyono; Ahmad Syaikhu
- Founded: 24 March 2023; 3 years ago
- Dissolved: 30 April 2024; 2 years ago
- Preceded by: Onward Indonesia Coalition; Just and Prosperous Indonesia Coalition
- Merged into: Advanced Indonesia Coalition
- Succeeded by: Gerakan Rakyat (People's Movement) (de facto); Party of Change (unofficial)
- Ideology: Pancasila; Social justice Welfare state Social democracy Progressivism; Constitutionalism; Indonesian nationalism Factions: Islamism; Anti-Jokowism; Anti-Prabowoism
- Political position: Big-tent
- Member parties: NasDem; Democratic (until 2023); PKB (from 2023); PKS; Ummat
- Supporting parties: Masyumi; Partai Pelita; PDA; SIRA; PAS Aceh
- Colours: Sapphire; Forest green Minium
- Slogan: Indonesia Adil Makmur untuk Semua (Just and Prosperous Indonesia for All); AMIN Aja Dulu! (Just AMIN First!)
- DPR RI: 190 / 580
- DPRD I: 700 / 2,372
- DPRD II: 5,061 / 17,510

Website
- aminajadulu.com
- Politics of Indonesia; Political parties; Elections; A: Anies Baswedan dissolved the national teams, but he remained as opposition after disbandment. B: The coalition is considered as from centre-left, centre, right-wing, and far-right that does tend a big tent position.

The Coalition of Change for Unity (Indonesian: Koalisi Perubahan untuk Persatuan, KPP), also known as the Coalition of Change (Indonesian: Koalisi Perubahan, KP) or the Blue Sapphire Coalition (Indonesian: Koalisi Biru Safir, KBS), and formerly known as the Red Ant Coalition (Indonesian: Koalisi Semut Merah, KSM), was a political alliance in Indonesia, formed through an agreement between three political parties: NasDem Party, PKS, and Democratic Party, in preparation for the 2024 Indonesian presidential election.

On 3 October 2022, NasDem Party leader Surya Paloh officially declared Anies Baswedan as their presidential candidate for the 2024 Indonesian presidential election. As of December 2022, Coalition of Change has not yet officially been formed from the three political parties, despite confirmations it was in the works, with current plans for formation set for January 2023. On 24 March 2023, the coalition formally chartered by the three parties.

In September 2023, the Democratic Party left the coalition after Anies chose Muhaimin Iskandar, PKB's chairman, as his running mate, and PKB subsequently joined the coalition.

== Background ==
The NasDem Party—a supporter of President Joko Widodo—proposed three potential presidential candidates and eventually endorsed Anies Baswedan. This declaration was later supported by the Democratic Party and the Prosperous Justice Party (PKS).

Earlier, during PKS's 2022 National Leadership Meeting, the party initiated the idea of a "Change Coalition," advocating for a more just, prosperous, democratic, united, and sovereign Indonesia with a strategic global role.

In June 2022, PKS and the National Awakening Party (PKB) formed the Red Ant Coalition as an exploratory initiative for a new political axis. Both parties opened the possibility for others to join. However, political dynamics shifted when PKB joined Gerindra to sign the Sentul Charter and formed a joint secretariat backing Prabowo Subianto in August 2022.

In early 2023, the Democratic Party officially nominated Anies as its presidential candidate. The party also proposed its chairman, Agus Harimurti Yudhoyono, as Anies' running mate. PKS also proposed Ahmad Heryawan but signaled openness to AHY.

Speculation arose that if AHY wasn't chosen, the coalition might collapse. PKS officially endorsed Anies in February 2023. Later, the Democratic Party also declared its support, allowing Anies to meet the presidential threshold. The three parties agreed Anies would choose his running mate. According to Democratic Secretary-General Teuku Riefky Harsya, all three party chairs would soon sign a cooperation agreement. Ummah Party, founded by Amien Rais, also supported Anies, but would back Prabowo if Anies failed to run.

After the formation of the Advanced Indonesia Coalition in late August 2023, PKB withdrew and partnered with NasDem. Anies and Muhaimin Iskandar were officially declared as presidential and vice-presidential candidates in Surabaya on 2 September 2023. Anies became the first candidate to announce his running mate. The Democratic Party rejected this move, claiming Anies had previously promised to choose AHY. In protest, Democratic cadres removed joint Anies–AHY billboards across regions. Ultimately, the Democratic Party withdrew support and joined the Advanced Indonesia Coalition backing Prabowo.

== Timeline ==
- 3 October 2022 – The NasDem Party, led by Surya Paloh, officially declared Anies Baswedan as its presidential candidate for the 2024 Indonesian presidential election.
- 26 January 2023 – Agus Harimurti Yudhoyono, chairman of the Democratic Party (Indonesia), issued a written statement declaring the party's support for Anies Baswedan.
- 30 January 2023 – Mohamad Sohibul Iman, Deputy Chairman of PKS's Syura Council, declared the party's official support for Anies, following consultations with the party's chairman and council leader.
- 24 March 2023 – Representatives of the coalition, including Sudirman Said, Teuku Riefky Harsya, Willy Aditya, Sugeng Suparwoto, Mohamad Sohibul Iman, and Al Muzzammil Yusuf, announced the formal agreement between the three party leaders to form the Coalition of Change for Unity.
- 1 September 2023 – Andi Alfian Mallarangeng, Secretary of the Democratic Party's High Council, announced the party's withdrawal from the coalition and its retraction of support for Anies.
- 2 September 2023 – National Awakening Party (PKB) joined the coalition and declared Anies Baswedan and Muhaimin Iskandar as its presidential and vice-presidential candidates in a declaration at the Hotel Majapahit, Surabaya.
- 15 September 2023 – PKS's Syura Council formally endorsed Anies and Muhaimin as the coalition's presidential and vice-presidential candidates.
- 16 October 2023 – Ummah Party declared its support for the Anies–Muhaimin ticket.
- 19 October 2023 – Anies Baswedan and Muhaimin Iskandar officially registered as candidates with the General Elections Commission (KPU).
- 14 November 2023 – Anies announced the national campaign team for the 2024 elections.
- 22 November 2023 – Anies and Muhaimin introduced 89 national spokespersons for the AMIN national campaign team.

== Candidates ==
Name	Born (age)	Party	Positions held	Campaign	Ref.
Anies Rasyid Baswedan (Presidential candidate)	May 7, 1969 (age 57); Kuningan, West Java	Independent	Rector of Paramadina University (2007–2015); Minister of Education and Culture (2014–2016); Governor of Jakarta (2017–2022)	Declaration: 2 September 2023 Registration: 18 October 2023	
Abdul Muhaimin Iskandar (Vice presidential candidate)	September 24, 1966 (age 60); Jombang, East Java	National Awakening Party	Minister of Manpower and Transmigration (2009–2014); Deputy Speaker of the DPR (1999–2009, 2019–present); Deputy Speaker of the MPR (2018–2019)	Declaration: 2 September 2023 Registration: 18 October 2023	

== Aftermath ==
After it failed to win the 2024 presidential election, and with PKB and Nasdem joining Prabowo's coalition on 24 and 25 April 2024, respectively, the coalition disbanded on 26 April 2024. On 30 April, Anies and Muhaimin formally dissolved the national teams and the coalition publicly.

Former presidential candidate Anies has not taken a position whether or not he would join Prabowo's government, since he is not from a political party with a standardized stance.

== Member parties ==
=== Original members ===
Name		Ideology	Position	Leader(s)	2024 result	
Name		Ideology	Position	Leader(s)	Votes (%)	Seats
National party / members of DPR
NasDem	NasDem Party; Partai NasDem	Social liberalism	Centre to centre-left	Surya Paloh	9.66%	69 / 580
PKB	National Awakening Party; Partai Kebangkitan Bangsa	Islamic democracy	Centre	Muhaimin Iskandar	10.62%	68 / 580
PKS	Prosperous Justice Party; Partai Keadilan Sejahtera	Islamism	Right-wing	Ahmad Syaikhu	8.42%	53 / 580
National party / non-members of DPR
Ummat	Ummah Party; Partai Ummat	Islamism	Right-wing to far-right	Ridho Rahmadi	0.42%	0 / 580
National party / unqualified for 2024 election
Masyumi	Masyumi Party; Partai Masyumi	Islamism	Far-right	Ahmad Yani	—N/a	—N/a
Pelita	Pelita Party; Partai Pelita	Islamism	Centre-right	Beni Pramula	—N/a	—N/a
Aceh regional party
PDA	Aceh Abode Party; Partai Darul Aceh	Aceh regionalism	Right-wing	Muhibbussabri A. Wahab	TBA	1 / 81 (seats at DPRA)
SIRA	Independent Solidity of the Acehnese Party; Partai Soliditas Independen Rakyat Aceh	Aceh regionalism	Right-wing	Muslim Syamsuddin	TBA	1 / 81 (seats at DPRA)
PAS Aceh	Aceh Just and Prosperous Party; Partai Adil Sejahtera Aceh	Islamism	Right-wing	Tu Bulqaini Tanjongan	TBA	3 / 81 (seats at DPRA)

=== Leaving members ===
Name		Ideology	Position	Leader(s)	2024 result		Merger
Name		Ideology	Position	Leader(s)	Votes (%)	Seats	Merger
National party / members of DPR
NasDem	NasDem Party; Partai NasDem	Social liberalism	Centre to centre-left	Surya Paloh	9.66%	69 / 580	Neutral (2024–present)
PKB	National Awakening Party; Partai Kebangkitan Bangsa	Islamic democracy	Centre	Muhaimin Iskandar	10.62%	68 / 580	Advanced Indonesia (2024–present)
PKS	Prosperous Justice Party; Partai Keadilan Sejahtera	Islamism	Right-wing	Ahmad Syaikhu	8.42%	53 / 580	Neutral (2024–present)

== General election results ==
Election	Seats			Total votes	Share of votes	Outcome of election
Election	No.	%	±	Total votes	Share of votes	Outcome of election
2024	190 / 580	32.75%	▲23 (2019 result)	44,199,477	29.11%	Confidence and supply (Note: NasDem Party and Prosperous Justice Party offer confidence and supply to the Subianto Cabinet, while the National Awakening Party joined the government coalition.)

== See also ==
- Anies Baswedan 2024 presidential campaign
