= Anies Baswedan 2024 presidential campaign =

Indonesian presidential campaign

Anies Baswedan for President
- Campaign: 2024 Indonesian presidential election
- Candidate: Anies Baswedan; Governor of Jakarta (2017–2022); Muhaimin Iskandar; Deputy Speaker of the House of Representatives (2019–present)
- Affiliation: Coalition of Change for Unity
- Status: Registered: 19 October 2023; Authorized: 13 November 2023; Lost election: 20 March 2024
- Headquarters: Jl. Diponegoro 10, Menteng, Jakarta
- Key people: Chief executive: Syaugi Alaydrus; Secretary: Novita Dewi
- Slogans: Indonesia Adil Makmur untuk Semua (Just and Prosperous Indonesia for All); AMIN Aja Dulu! (Just AMIN First!); (Note: "AMIN" being a play on "amin," the Indonesian word for amen)

Website
- aminajadulu.com fitnahlagi.com

The electoral campaign for the 2024 Indonesian presidential election of Anies Baswedan, former governor of Jakarta, was officially launched on 3 October 2022 after NasDem Party leader Surya Paloh officially declared Anies Baswedan as their presidential candidate for the 2024 Indonesian presidential election. In September 2023, National Awakening Party (PKB) joined Anies Coalition and endorsed PKB's chairman Muhaimin Iskandar as Anies running mate.

== Background ==
Anies Baswedan was elected the governor of Jakarta, capital of Indonesia, in 2017. In 2018, then-candidate Prabowo Subianto asked Anies to become his running mate for the 2019 presidential election but refused due to his commitment as governor until 2022. Nearing the end of his term, his name came up again as a potential presidential candidate. The incumbent president, Joko Widodo (“Jokowi”) was governor of Jakarta before his candidacy as president in 2014. Anies was once one of the candidates at the Democratic Party convention in 2013, but lost to Dahlan Iskan. In the end the Democratic Party failed to register their nominee for having their number of seats below the presidential threshold.

The announcement of Muhaimin and the PKB sparked controversy within Anies coalition as some of the parties that provided initial support for Anies' candidacy, the Democratic Party and the Prosperous Justice Party (PKS), were not previously notified of Muhaimin's candidacy. The announcement shocked the Democratic Party. The party claimed that Anies had previously asked its chairman, Agus Harimurti Yudhoyono (AHY), to be his running mate but there was no agreement between the Nasdem Party and Anies as they were still waiting for other potential candidates. But at the same time, Nasdem's chairman, Surya Paloh, decided to forge unity between Anies and Muhaimin as a pair of presidential-vice presidential candidates. After an emergency meeting held at Democratic Party founder Susilo Bambang Yudhoyono's house in Cikeas, Bogor Regency, the Democrats announced their withdrawal from Anies coalition. Shortly after, the party joined Prabowo coalition, albeit their effort to offer AHY as Prabowo's candidate failed as Gibran Rakabuming was chosen as his running mate. The PKS, on the other hand, were disappointed by the sudden decision to pick Muhaimin as a vice-presidential candidate, but remained committed to the coalition.

== Announcement ==
=== Nasdem endorsement ===
In October 2022 after speculations from media outlets, Nasdem officially endorsed Anies Baswedan as their candidate for the 2024 election at their headquarters in jakarta. Chairman of Nasdem Party, Surya Paloh said he chose Anies as he is ‘the best’ candidate. Anies was one of the founders of the National Democrat organisation, the namesake of the Nasdem Party.

=== Democrat and PKS Endorsement ===
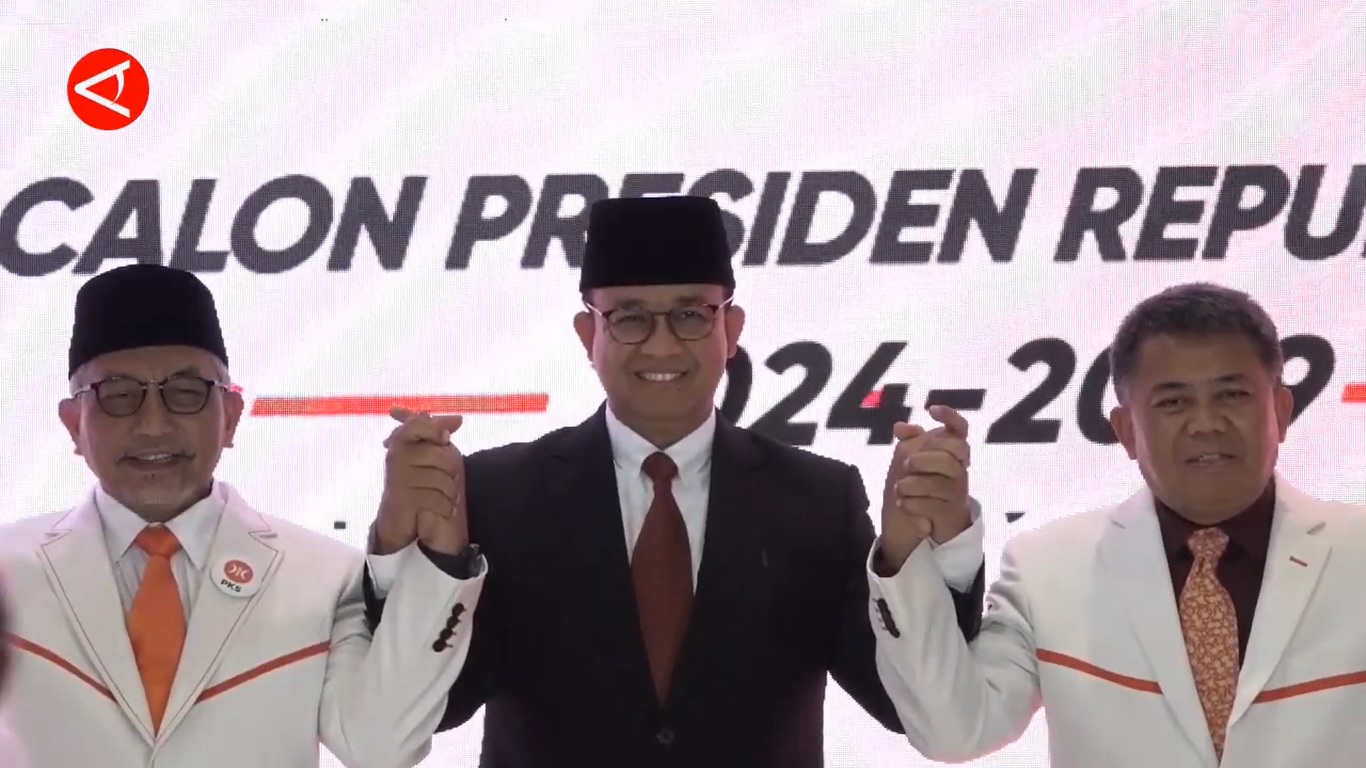
Anies Baswedan (middle) with PKS President Ahmad Syaikhu (left) and Sohibul Iman (right) during PKS endorsement for Anies Baswedan.

In January 2023, Democratic Party and Prosperous Justice Party (PKS) joined Nasdem to endorse Anies candidacy. Democrat and Anies previously had several meetings regarding his intention to become presidential candidate in late 2022 while PKS is one of the political parties that endorsed Anies during the 2017 Jakarta Gubernatorial election.

== Running mate ==
=== Selection ===
Several politicians have been named by the campaign team as a potential running mate for Anies, including Agus Harimurti Yudhoyono (Chairman of Democratic Party), Khofifah Indar Parawansa (Governor of East Java (2019–present)), Yenny Wahid (Politician and daughter of the 4th President of Indonesia Abdurrahman Wahid), Andika Perkasa (former Commander of Indonesian National Armed Forces), Ahmad Heryawan (Governor of West Java (2008–2018)), and Susi Pudjiastuti (entrepreneur and Minister of Maritime Affairs and Fisheries of Indonesia (2014–2019)).

=== Muhaimin Iskandar announcement and PKB join the coalition ===
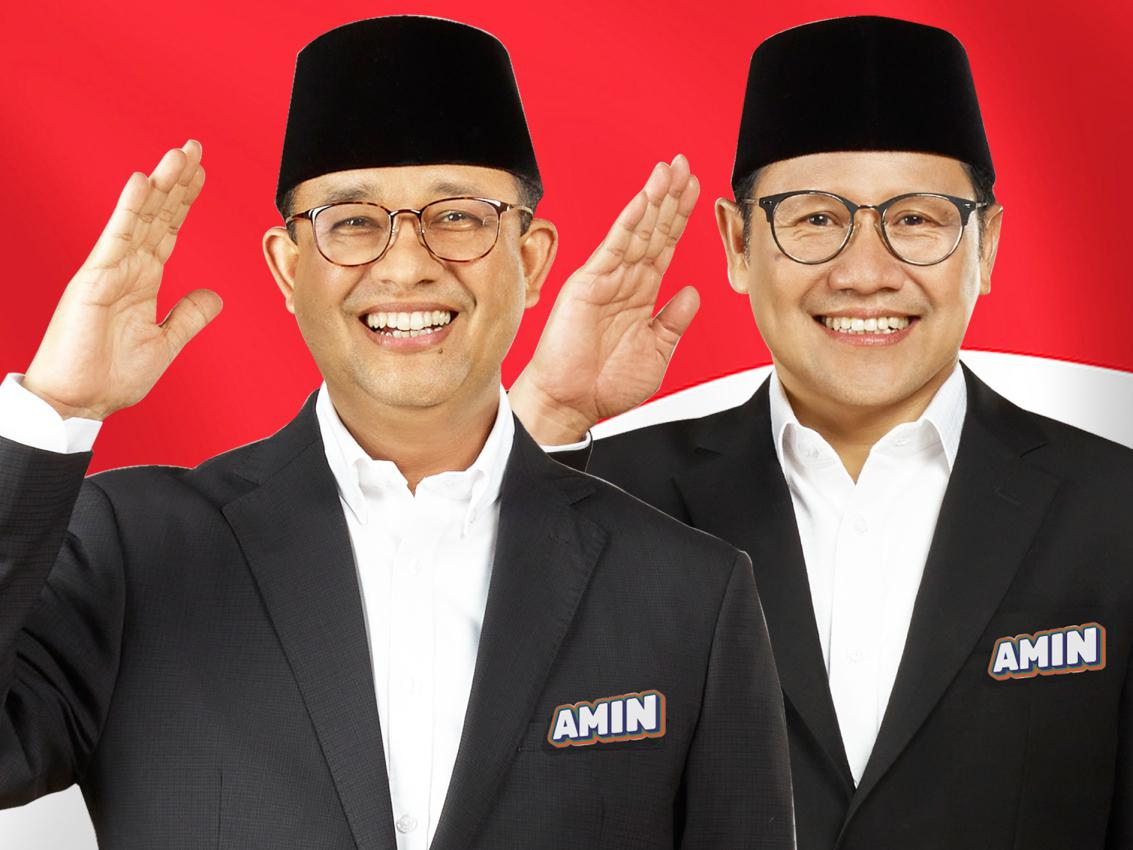
Anies Baswedan (left) and Muhaimin Iskandar (right) official portrait for 2024 Presidential election.

After months of deliberation from Anies inner circle, on 1 September 2023, Anies and Nasdem officially announced Muhaimin Iskandar (Gus Imin) as their vice-president candidate and National Awakening Party (PKB) endorsement for their candidacy at Hotel Majapahit, Surabaya. Previously, PKB was endorsing Prabowo's candidacy with Muhaimin as the leading running mate. After a sudden change in their coalition's name from Great Indonesia Awakening Coalition (KKIR) to Advanced Indonesia Coalition (KIM) the alliance with Prabowo and Gerindra was technically over and PKB withdrew their endorsement.

=== Democratic Party withdrawal ===
The announcement of Muhaimin and PKB sparked controversy within Anies coalition as Democratic Party and PKS were not previously notified by them of Muhaimin's candidacy. The announcement shocked the party. They claimed that Anies was already asking AHY to be his running mate but there was no agreement from Nasdem and Anies as they are still waiting for other potential candidates. Anies and Nasdem claimed that days before the announcement, he admittedly asking the president of Democratic Party, Agus Harimurti Yudhoyono (AHY) to be his running mate, but the Democrats urged Anies and the coalition to announce the candidacy soon due to logistics pressure. After an emergency meeting held at Democratic Party founder Susilo Bambang Yudhoyono's house in Cikeas, Bogor Regency, the Democrats announced their withdrawal from Anies coalition. Shortly after, the party joined Prabowo coalition, albeit their effort to offer AHY as Prabowo's candidate failed as Gibran Rakabuming was chosen as his running mate. PKS on the other hand, were disappointed by the sudden announcement of Muhaimin and PKB, but remains committed to the coalition.

== Coalition parties ==
=== National parties ===
- NasDem Party
- Prosperous Justice Party
- National Awakening Party
- Ummah Party

Withdrawn support:

- Democratic Party – withdrawn on 2 September 2023.

==== Parties that did not compete in 2024 election ====
- Masyumi Party
- Pelita Party

=== Local parties (Aceh) ===
- Aceh Abode Party
- Independent Solidity of the Acehnese Party
- Aceh Just and Prosperous Party

== Campaign team ==
On 21 November 2023, Anies and Muhaimin announced the members of AMIN National Campaign Team (Timnas AMIN) to support their campaign during the general campaign period. Marshal (Ret.) Muhammad Syaugi Alaydrus was announced as their "Captain". Other high level members included former Minister of Energy and Natural Resources Sudirman Said, former Minister of Trade Thomas Lembong, former Corruption Eradication Commission chairman Abraham Samad, former Chief Justice of the Constitutional Court of Indonesia Hamdan Zoelva and many others such as Dr. Muhammad Iqbal as their spokesman.

During the grand campaign at Jakarta International Stadium (JIS) on 10 February 2024, Anies and Muhaimin received a criticism because the vest worn by Surya Paloh, Chairman of NasDem Party which endorsed them, used a design from artificial intelligence (AI). This caused debate because Anies and Muhaimin were considered to be opposing what they had been doing, namely supporting local artists. Three of their supporters also became unconscious and died during the campaign.

After the election and the Constitutional Court lawsuit, the campaign team was officially disbanded on 30 April 2024.

=== Logistics ===
Anies's campaign spent the least among the three candidates, at 49 billion rupiahs (3.13 million US dollars in 2024). Prabowo Subianto 2024 presidential campaign's spendings reached 208 billion rupiahs, while Ganjar Pranowo 2024 presidential campaign sits at 506 billion rupiahs in spending.
