= Confidence and supply =

Political arrangement allowing a minority government in parliamentary democracies

In parliamentary democracies, especially those based on the Westminster system, confidence and supply is an arrangement under which a minority government (one which does not control a majority in the legislature) receives the support of one or more parties and/or independent MPs on confidence votes and the state budget ("supply"). On issues other than those outlined in the confidence and supply agreement, non-government partners to the agreement are not bound to support the government on any given piece of legislation.

A coalition government is a more formal arrangement than a confidence-and-supply agreement in which junior parties (i.e., parties other than the largest) are generally expected to hold the government whip on passing legislation and formally participate in the government, with members holding office in the cabinet and ministerial roles.

== Confidence ==
In most parliamentary democracies, members of a parliament can propose a motion of confidence (Note: Otherwise, when it is proposed by the Government itself upon a piece of legislation, "the Chambers are enslaved in the exercise of their principal function just because it was thought that their being master of the fiduciary relationship were to be reaffirmed on each bill": Argondizzo, Domenico; Buonomo, Giampiero (April 2014). "Spigolature intorno all'attuale bicameralismo e proposte per quello futuro". Mondoperaio.net. Archived from the original on 1 August 2012 – via Questia.) or of no confidence in the government or executive. The results of such motions show how much support the government currently has in parliament. Should a motion of confidence fail, or a motion of no confidence pass, the government will usually either resign and allow other politicians to form a new government, or call an election.

== Supply ==
Most parliamentary democracies require an annual state budget, called an appropriation bill or supply bill, or occasional financial measures to be passed by parliament in order for a government to pay its way and enact its policies. The failure of a supply bill is in effect the same as the failure of a confidence motion. In early modern England, the withholding of funds was one of Parliament's few ways of controlling the monarch.

== List of governments currently under a confidence-and-supply agreement ==
Country	Head of government	Governing parties	Confidence partners	Seats				
Country	Head of government	Governing parties	Confidence partners	Government		Support	Total	
Chile	José Antonio Kast	PRCh – UDI – RN – Evópoli	PNL	68	43.9%	8	76/155	49.0%
Croatia	Andrej Plenković	HDZ – DP	HSLS – HNS-LD – HDS – HSU – Ind.	67	44.4%	10	77/151	50.3%
Denmark	Mette Frederiksen	A – F – M – B	Ø – Å – JF – B – N – IA	82	45.8%	20	102/179	57.0%
Indonesia	Prabowo Subianto	Gerindra – Golkar – PKB – PAN – Democratic	PDI-P – NasDem – PKS	348	60%	232	580/580	100%
Iran	Masoud Pezeshkian	Reformists	Principlists (CCIRF – UCIRF)	43	14.8%	119	162/290	55.8%
Pakistan	Shehbaz Sharif	PMLN – MQM–P – PMLQ – IPP – PTI–P – BAP	PPP	108	32.1%	68	176/336	52.3%
Spain	Pedro Sánchez	PSOE – Sumar	ERC – Junts – EH Bildu – EAJ/PNV – BNG – CCa	152	43.4%	27	179/350	51.1%
Sweden	Ulf Kristersson	M – KD – L	SD	103	29.5%	73	176/349	50.4%
Turkey	Recep Tayyip Erdoğan	AKP	MHP – HÜDA PAR – DSP	263	43.8%	55	318/600	53.0%
Sub-national								
(Spain) Asturias	Adrián Barbón	FSA-PSOE	IU/IX – IAS	19	42.2%	4	23/45	51.1%
(Spain) Balearic Islands	Marga Prohens	PP	Vox	25	42.3%	9	34/59	57.6%
(Spain) Murcia	Fernando López Miras	PP	Vox	21	46.6%	9	30/45	66.6%
(Australia) Australian Capital Territory	Andrew Barr	Labor	Greens	10	40.0%	4	14/25	56.0%
(Portugal) Azores	José Manuel Bolieiro	PPD/PSD – CDS-PP - PPM	Chega – IL	26	45.6%	3	29/57	50.9%
(Indonesia) Aceh	Muzakir Manaf	PA – PKB – Democratic – Gerindra – PPP – PKS – PNA – PDI-P	NasDem – Golkar – PAN – PAS-A – PDA	52	64.40%	29	81/81	100%
(Indonesia) Badung	I Wayan Adi Arnawa	PDI-P	Golkar	27	60.00%	11	38/45	84.44%
(Indonesia) Bali	I Wayan Koster	PDI-P	Democratic – NasDem	32	58.18%	5	37/55	67.27%
(Indonesia) Bandung	Muhammad Farhan	NasDem – PKB	PKS – PDI-P – Golkar – Gerindra – PSI – Democratic	11	22%	39	50/50	100%
(Indonesia) Jakarta	Pramono Anung	PDI-P	PKS – Gerindra – NasDem – Golkar – PKB – PAN – Democratic – Perindo	15	14.15%	82	97/106	91.51%
(Indonesia) West Java	Dedi Mulyadi	Gerindra – Golkar – Democratic – PAN – PSI	PPP	55	45.83%	6	61/120	50.83%
(Australia) New South Wales	Chris Minns	Labor	Ind. (AG, GP, JM)	45	48.3%	3	48/93	51.6%
(Australia) Tasmania	Jeremy Rockliff	Liberal	Ind. (DO)	14	40.0%	1	15/35	42.9%
(Germany) Thuringia	Mario Voigt	CDU – BSW – SPD	LINKE	44	50%	12	56/88	63.3%
Tamil Nadu	C. Joseph Vijay	TVK	CPI-CPI(M)	116	49.15%	4	119/234	50.85%

== Examples of confidence-and-supply deals ==
=== Australia ===
==== Federal ====
The Australian Labor Party Gillard government formed a minority government in the hung parliament elected at the 2010 federal election resulting from a confidence-and-supply agreement with three independent MPs and one Green MP.

==== New South Wales ====
Following the 2023 New South Wales state election, the Labor opposition reached 45 out of 47 seats required for a majority. Independent MLAs, Alex Greenwich, Greg Piper, and Joe McGirr entered into a confidence-and-supply agreement with the Labor government.

==== Tasmania ====
Following the 2024 Tasmanian state election, the incumbent Liberal government reached 14 out of 18 seats required for a majority. The Jacqui Lambie Network, along with Independent MHAs, David O'Byrne and Kristie Johnston entered into a confidence-and-supply agreement with the Liberal government.

==== Australian Capital Territory ====
Following the 2024 Australian Capital Territory election, the ACT Labor Party party reached 10 out of 13 seats required for a majority, with the ACT Greens holding the balance of power with 4 seats. Unlike the previous three elections, Labor and the Greens did not enter into a coalition government. Instead, the Greens pledged to provide confidence and supply to a minority Labor government.

=== Canada ===
==== Federal ====
In November 2008, the Liberal Party and the Bloc Québécois signed a confidence agreement to support a proposed coalition. However, the proposed agreements fell apart in January 2009, as a result of an ensuing parliamentary dispute.

In 2022, a few months into the 44th Canadian Parliament, the NDP agreed to a confidence and supply agreement with the governing Liberal Party, to continue the Liberal minority government. The deal was intended to keep the minority Liberal government in power until 2025, with the NDP agreeing to support the government on confidence motions and budget votes. In exchange, the Liberal government pledged to advance work on key NDP policy priorities on dental care, pharmaceutical drugs, and affordable childcare. NDP leader Jagmeet Singh announced the early termination of the agreement on 4 September 2024.

==== British Columbia ====
2017–2020

Following the 2017 British Columbia provincial election, the Green Party of British Columbia agreed to a confidence-and-supply agreement in support of the British Columbia New Democratic Party. The incumbent British Columbia Liberal Party, which held a plurality of seats, briefly tried to form a government, but was immediately defeated in a confidence vote by the NDP and Greens. The agreement, which was intended to remain in effect until the next fixed election in October 2021, was ended early when premier John Horgan requested the lieutenant governor call a snap election in 2020.

2024–2026

The NDP and Green Party announced on 13 December 2024 that they had concluded a confidence and supply agreement, the 2024 Co-operation and Responsible Government Accord, after the NDP won a slim 1-seat majority government a few months earlier in the 2024 provincial election. The agreement will have the Green Party support the NDP government on all confidence votes for a term of four years, subject to annual renewal, in exchange for cooperation on shared policy goals like expanding health care funding and public transit. In February 2026, the BC Greens decided not to renew the agreement after it accused the BC NDP government of not implementing the terms of the agreement.

==== New Brunswick ====
On 2 November 2018 (less than two months after the 2018 New Brunswick general election) the legislative assembly voted 25–23 for a motion, introduced by the Progressive Conservatives, to amend the throne speech to declare no confidence in the government. Subsequently, Premier Brian Gallant indicated his intention to resign the premiership and recommend to the lieutenant governor that PC leader Blaine Higgs be given the mandate to form a minority government: "I will go see the lieutenant-governor at her earliest convenience to inform her that I will be resigning as premier, and I will humbly suggest to her honour to allow the leader of the Conservative Party to attempt to form a government and attempt to gain the confidence of the house". People's Alliance leader Kris Austin said he would work with the new government "in the areas we agree on," and reiterated his promise to support the Progressive Conservatives on confidence votes for a period of 18 months. Green Party leader David Coon said he would start working with the Tories in an attempt to ensure his party's issues were on the government's agenda.

==== Ontario ====
Twenty-two days after the 1985 Ontario provincial election, the Progressive Conservative Party of Ontario government resigned following a motion of no confidence, and the Ontario Liberal Party formed a government with the support of the Ontario New Democratic Party. The agreement between the two parties was referred to as "The Accord".

==== Yukon ====
After the 2021 territorial election resulted in the Yukon Liberal Party and the Yukon Party winning the same number of seats, the third place Yukon New Democratic Party agreed to provide confidence and supply to a Liberal minority government.

=== India ===
Third Front national governments were formed in 1989 and 1996 with outside support of one of the two major parties, BJP or Congress.

The CPI-M gave outside support to the Congress Party from 2004 to 2008, but later withdrew support after the India–United States Civil Nuclear Agreement.

=== Ireland ===
Following the 2016 general election, a minority government was formed by Fine Gael and some independents, with confidence and supply (Irish: muinín agus soláthar) support from Fianna Fáil in return for a published set of policy commitments from the government. Fianna Fáil abstained on confidence and supply votes, but reserved the right to vote for or against any bill proposed in the Dáil or Seanad. The deal lasted until the 32nd Dáil was dissolved on 14 January 2020 for a general election to be held in February 2020.

=== Italy ===
In Italy, the equivalent of confidence and supply is called "external support" (Italian: appoggio esterno). Starting from the 1950s through the 1970s there were various examples of Christian Democratic cabinets being able to govern thanks to confidence and supply agreements with other minor parties. Most famously, the Andreotti III Cabinet was formed in 1976 with a confidence and supply agreement between the Christian Democrats and the Italian Communist Party, referred to as "the historic compromise" (Italian: il compromesso storico), in which the Communist Party agreed not to vote against the government during confidence votes.

The Dini Cabinet, formed in 1995, and the Monti Cabinet, formed in 2011, were technocratic governments which relied on the support of the main parties in Parliament during confidence votes.

=== Malaysia ===
A confidence and supply agreement was signed on 13 September 2021 between Barisan Nasional and Pakatan Harapan to strengthen political stability amid the COVID-19 pandemic. This is the first such agreement signed to ensure bipartisan cooperation.

=== New Zealand ===
In New Zealand, confidence and supply arrangements are common due to the MMP system used in the country. The parties providing confidence and supply have a more prominent role than in other countries, with MPs from the support parties often being appointed to ministerial portfolios outside of Cabinet. New Zealand codified the procedures it used to form these Governments in its Cabinet Manual.

John Key's National Party administration formed a minority government in 2008 thanks to a confidence-and-supply agreement with the ACT, United Future and the Māori Party. A similar arrangement in 2005 had led to Helen Clark's Labour Party forming a coalition government with the Progressive Party, with support on confidence and supply from New Zealand First and United Future. Following the 2011, 2014 elections, National re-entered confidence-and-supply agreements with United Future, the ACT Party, and the Māori Party. In 2017, despite National winning more votes than Labour in the election, New Zealand First chose to enter coalition with Labour to help them change the government, with support on confidence and supply from the left-wing Green Party.

=== Sweden ===
After the 2022 elections, the right-wing parliamentary faction consisting of the Sweden Democrats, Moderate Party, Christian Democrats, and Liberals won a slim majority of 176 out of 349 seats in the Riksdag (Swedish Parliament). Following a month of negotiations, the Tidö Agreement was signed between the parties. Along with a list of common reforms, the agreement stipulates the parties' intention to govern as a coalition, with the confidence and supply from the Sweden Democrats.

Some European Union lawmakers criticised the centre-right and the Moderate Party in particular, as a member of the European People's Party, for allying with the far-right, as did Swedish opposition leaders.

=== Thailand ===
In September 2025, the People's Party (successor to the now-dissolved Move Forward Party, winner of the 2023 Thai general election) formed an agreement with the Bhumjaithai Party to lend its votes to Anutin Charnvirakul, enabling him to become the 32nd prime minister of Thailand under the conditions that the Anutin cabinet must commit to a nationwide referendum on constitution amendments, and the dissolution of parliament within 4 months. This agreement followed the fall of the Paetongtarn cabinet due to the 2025 Thai political crisis and is relatively unusual. Scholars noted that minority governments and confidence-and-supply agreements were virtually unheard of in Thai politics. Moreover, the parties involved sit on opposite sides of the political spectrum: Bhumjaithai is staunchly conservative, while the People's Party is progressive, its predecessor having been dissolved due to its calls for monarchy reform. A factor that led to this "unlikely alliance" was a peculiarity of the 2017 constitution, which limited candidates for prime minister to those whose names had been submitted by a party prior to the general election. This meant that despite being the largest party in the House of Representatives, the People's Party could only support a candidate of one of its ideological rivals. The coalition proved unstable and collapsed even before the agreed four month deadline. Due to disagreements over the constitutional reform process, the People's Party was already planning a motion of no confidence against Anutin by December 2025, which he then avoided by dissolving parliament and calling for new elections.

=== United Kingdom ===
==== Westminster government ====
Between 1977 and 1978, James Callaghan's Labour Party stayed in power thanks to a confidence-and-supply agreement with the Liberal Party, in a deal which became known as the Lib–Lab Pact. In return, the Labour Party agreed to modest policy concessions for the Liberal Party.

In the aftermath of the 2017 general election which left Theresa May's Conservative Party without a majority, a confidence-and-supply agreement was agreed with the Democratic Unionist Party which lasted until the 2019 general election.

==== Devolved government ====
Confidence and supply deals are more frequent in the devolved legislatures of Scotland and Wales due to the use of proportional representation. The Scottish National Party and Scottish Green Party had a confidence and supply deal in the Scottish Parliament between 2021 and 2024. The Welsh Labour Party and Plaid Cymru had a similar co-operation deal in the Senedd between 2016–October 2017 and 2021–2024.
