= Fachry Pahlevi Konggoasa =

Indonesian politician (born 1995)

- Konggoasa as a DPR member

Member of the House of Representatives
- In office 1 October 2019 – 1 October 2024
- Constituency: Southeast Sulawesi

Personal details
- Born: 14 May 1995 (age 31) Kendari, Southeast Sulawesi, Indonesia
- Party: PDI-P (since 2024); PAN (before 2024)

Fachry Pahlevi Konggoasa (born 14 May 1995) is an Indonesian politician from Southeast Sulawesi, presently of the Indonesian Democratic Party of Struggle. He previously served as a member of the House of Representatives representing his home province from 2019 to 2024 as a member of the National Mandate Party.

== Early life ==
Fachry Pahlevi Konggoasa was born on 14 May 1995 in Kendari, Southeast Sulawesi. He is the eldest of seven children of Kery Saiful Konggoasa, who served as the regent of Konawe Regency in Southeast Sulawesi from 2013 to 2023. He studied at public schools in Kendari, graduating high school in 2012 and later in 2018 he obtained a bachelor's in economics from an economics college in Makassar.

== Career ==
In the 2019 Indonesian legislative election, Konggoasa ran for a seat in the House of Representatives from the National Mandate Party in Southeast Sulawesi. He won a seat after securing 100,857 votes, breaking the record for most votes cast for a legislative candidate in the province. When sworn in on 1 October 2019, Konggoasa became the fifth-youngest DPR member for the term. Within DPR, he served in the Fourth Commission which covers forestry, agriculture, and the environment. In the middle of his term as a legislator, Konggoasa was elected as chairman of PAN's Konawe branch in 2021.

Konggoasa did not run for reelection in the 2024 Indonesian legislative election, though he chaired the Prabowo–Gibran campaign team in Konawe. In the 2024 Konawe regency election, Konggoasa ran as the running mate of the Indonesian Democratic Party of Struggle (PDI-P)'s candidate Rusdianto. Along with his candidacy, Konggoasa moved to PDI-P. Rusdianto and Konggoasa placed last in the three-way race with 36,476 votes (23.42%).

== Personal life ==
He married Irma Dwiyani Iksan, who is the daughter of Jeneponto Regency's 2013–2023 regent Iksan Iskandar, in 2020. As their dowry, aside from 30 cows and 3 buffaloes, Konggoasa also gave 12 hectares of nickel mines.
