= 2024 Indonesian presidential election =

- 14 February 2024
- Registered: 204,422,181 (▲6.04%)
- Turnout: 82.39% (▲0.42pp)
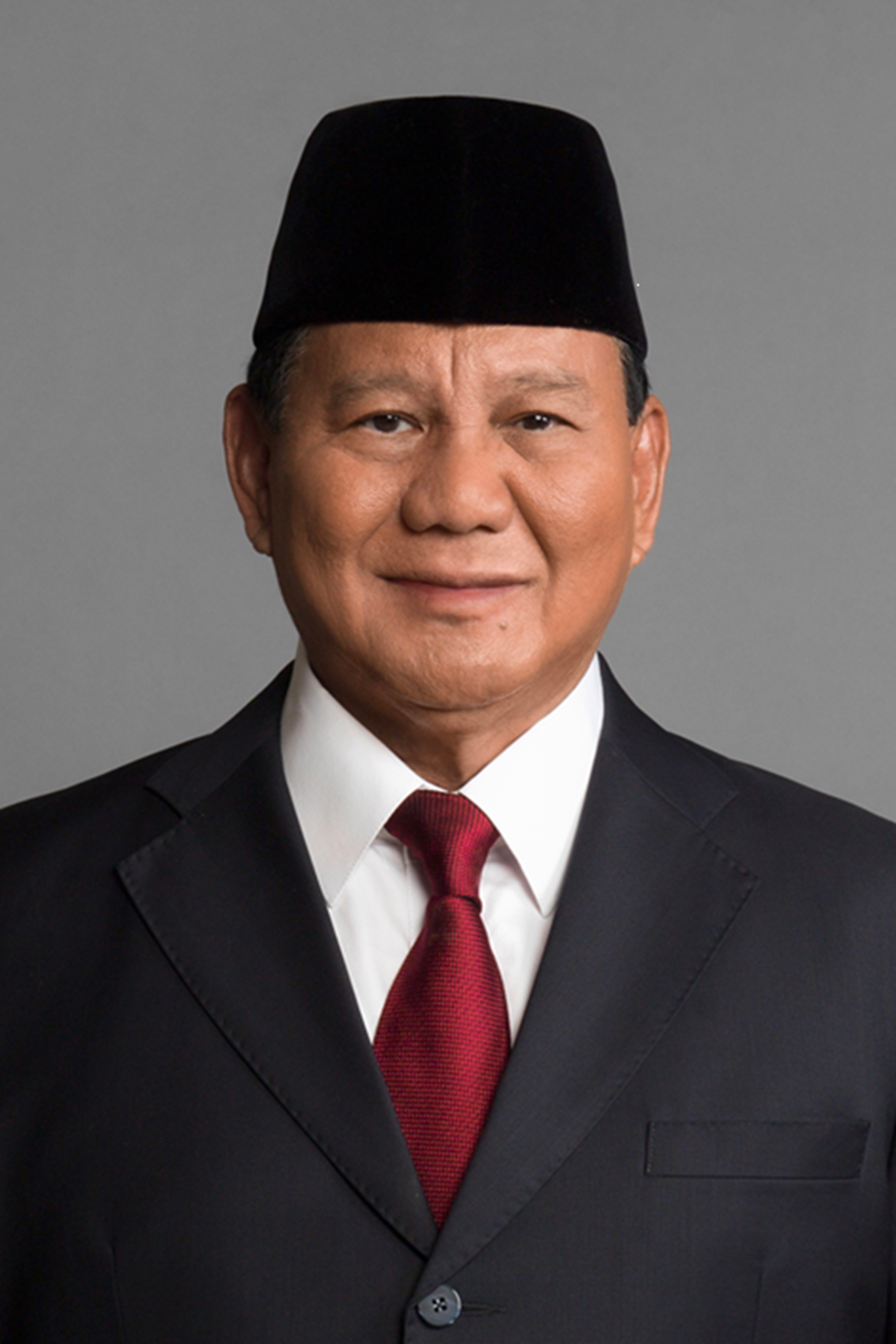

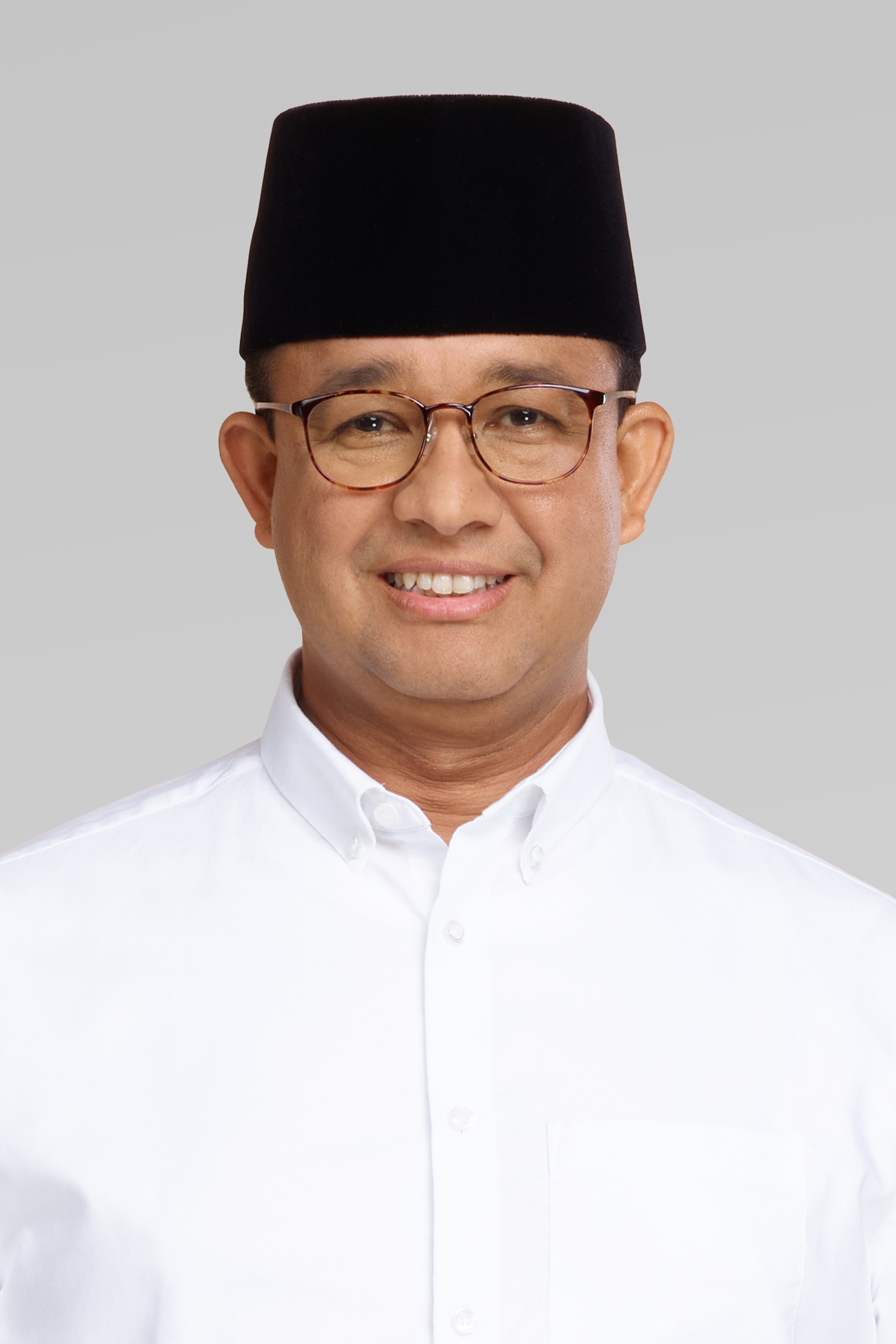

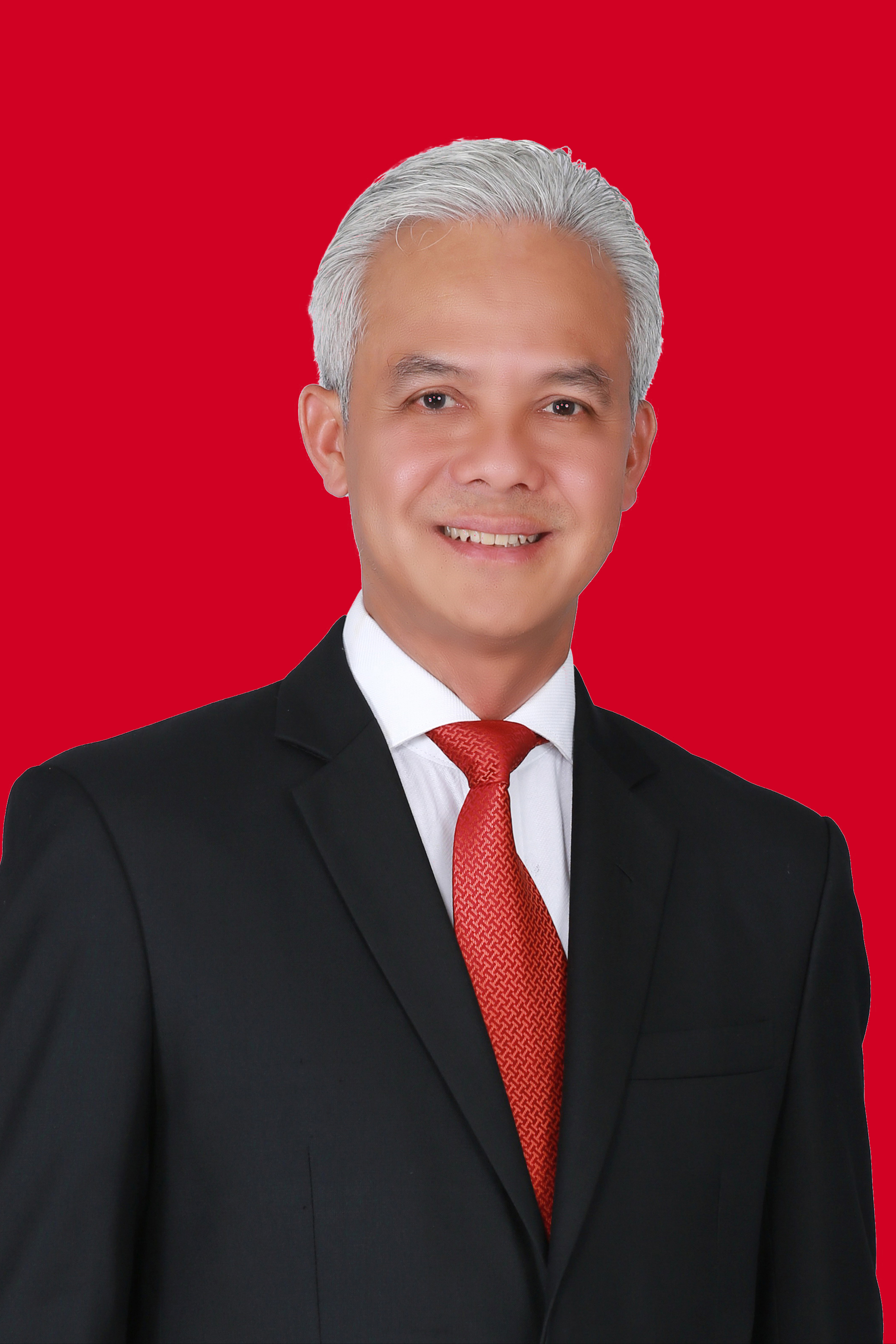
Candidate	Prabowo Subianto	Anies Baswedan	Ganjar Pranowo
Party	Gerindra	Independent (Note: Nominated by NasDem)	PDI-P
Alliance	Advanced Indonesia (Note: Including Gerindra, Golkar, the Democratic Party, the National Mandate Party, the Indonesian Solidarity Party, the Crescent Star Party, the Garuda Party, the Gelora Party, and the Aceh Party.)	Change (Note: Including NasDem, the National Awakening Party, the Prosperous Justice Party, the Ummah Party, the Aceh Abode Party, the Independent Solidity of the Acehnese Party, and the Aceh Just and Prosperous Party.)	Alliance of Parties (Note: Including PDI-P, the United Development Party, the Indonesian Unity Party, and the People's Conscience Party.)
Running mate	Gibran Rakabuming	Muhaimin Iskandar	Mahfud MD
Popular vote	96,214,691	40,971,906	27,040,878
Percentage	58.59%	24.95%	16.47%
President before election
Joko Widodo
PDI-P
Elected President
Prabowo Subianto
Gerindra

Presidential elections were held in Indonesia on 14 February 2024 with defence minister and former general Prabowo Subianto contesting the elections against the former governor of Jakarta, Anies Baswedan and the former governor of Central Java, Ganjar Pranowo; incumbent president Joko Widodo was constitutionally barred from seeking a third term in office.

On 20 March, the General Elections Commission (KPU) announced Prabowo's victory, having received over 96 million votes. Prabowo and his vice-presidential candidate, Gibran Rakabuming, were sworn in on 20 October 2024.

The presidential election was held together with the legislative election for members of the House of Representatives (DPR), the Senate (DPD), provincial legislative councils (DPRD Provinsi), and regency or municipal legislative councils (DPRD Kabupaten or DPRD Kota) throughout Indonesia.

The elevation of Prabowo to the presidency prompted concerns from scholars and observers about democratic backsliding in Indonesia.

== Background ==
2024 presidential election promotional logo

The 2014 and 2019 presidential elections were contested by the same two candidates. These are Prabowo Subianto, who was nominated by parties supporting the Susilo Bambang Yudhoyono administration, and Joko Widodo, who was mostly supported by the opposition and subsequently won. Jokowi won reelection in 2019 by winning 55.5% of the votes.

The President of Indonesia is directly elected every five years. As stipulated in Article 7 of the 1945 Constitution of the Republic of Indonesia, incumbent President Joko Widodo is ineligible to run for a third term. The presidential election was required to be held before the end of his current term on 20 October 2024.

In the 2019 election, Joko Widodo was re-elected with Ma'ruf Amin as his running mate. He chose his opponent in the election, Prabowo Subianto, as Minister of Defense after a reconciliation meeting in July 2019. The meeting, which ended the political feud between both men, also resulted in Gerindra Party and the National Mandate Party (PAN) in joining the governing Onward Indonesia Coalition (Koalisi Indonesia Maju).

== Electoral system ==
The general election period is regulated in Article 6A and Article 22E of the Constitution of the Republic of Indonesia and by the Law on General Elections. The presidential and vice-presidential candidate pairs are proposed by political parties or coalitions of political parties that have at least 20% of the seats in the House of Representatives (DPR) or at least 25% of the national vote from the previous House of Representatives general election. Of the parties in the 2019–2024 DPR, only PDI-P could nominate a pair of candidates without a coalition with other parties, given that the party met the presidential threshold requirement of at least 115 seats in the outgoing DPR." Some non-parliamentary political parties, both parties participating in the previous election and new parties after 2019, could choose to be supporting parties for a presidential candidate.

A runoff is held if no candidates obtains more than 50% of the votes with at least 20% of the votes in more than half of the provinces in Indonesia in the first round. As of 2024, a runoff has only ever taken place in 2004. This election is the first election since 2009 to have more than two candidates.

== Candidates ==
=== Nominees ===
==== Anies–Muhaimin ====
Former Governor of DKI Jakarta (2017‒2022) and Minister of Education and Culture (2014‒2016), Anies Baswedan, became the first presidential candidate nominated by a political party and managed to obtain a recommendation from the results of the national working meeting of the NasDem Party. He was endorsed by the Coalition of Change, which included the NasDem Party, the Prosperous Justice Party (PKS), and the Democratic Party. At that time, PKS nominated former West Java Governor Ahmad Heryawan as Anies' vice presidential candidate. Similarly, the Democratic Party nominated its chairman and rival in the 2017 gubernatorial election, Agus Harimurti Yudhoyono. Initially, Anies classed Agus' name as his running-mate. Over time, the coalition experienced political dynamics with the departure of the Democrats in favour of Prabowo's candidacy after the entry of PKB from the Great Indonesia Awakening Coalition which supported Prabowo, as the National Awakening Party (PKB) joined the Coalition of Change (Koalisi Perubahan) in support of Anies. The PKB's entry was accompanied by an agreement to pair Anies with their chairman, Deputy Speaker of the House of Representatives (DPR RI) (1999‒2009, and 2019‒present) and Minister of Labor and Transmigration (2009‒2014), Muhaimin Iskandar. Previously, he had been proposed by his party, PKB, as a vice-presidential candidate for Joko Widodo in the previous general election. He was even predicted to be nominated as a presidential candidate if he was not chosen as Jokowi's running mate.

1
2024 Coalition of Change ticket
Anies Baswedan	Muhaimin Iskandar
for President	for Vice President
Governor of DKI Jakarta (2017‒2022)	Deputy Speaker of the House of Representatives (DPR RI) (1999‒2009, 2019‒2024)
167 / 575(29%)
Campaign

==== Prabowo–Gibran ====
Prabowo Subianto was nominated by the Gerindra Party (Gerindra) as the presidential candidate on 12 August 2022. This was followed by two United Indonesia Coalition (KIB) member parties and non-parliamentary parties that became the forerunner of the Advanced Indonesia Coalition (Koalisi Indonesia Maju) after the dissolution of the Great Indonesia Awakening Coalition (Koalisi Kebangkitan Indonesia Raya) with the National Awakening Party (PKB). This will be Prabowo's fourth presidential run since he was Megawati Sukarnoputri's vice-presidential candidate in 2009. He is backed by the two KIB member parties, Golkar and PAN, as well as the non-parliamentary parties that formed the Advanced Indonesia Coalition after the dissolution of the Great Indonesia Awakening Coalition with PKB. The Democratic Party and the Indonesian Solidarity Party (PSI) joined later. PSI's support for Prabowo came after the appointment of Kaesang Pangarep, Gibran's younger brother, as party chairman.

On 22 October 2023, President Joko Widodo's eldest son and Mayor of Surakarta, Gibran Rakabuming, was announced as a vice presidential candidate following a nomination by Golkar, even though at that time of announcement, Gibran was still a member of the Indonesian Democratic Party of Struggle (PDI-P). He is only 36 years old but was allowed to run after the Constitutional Court (MK) ruling on 16 October 2023 which allowed presidential or vice presidential candidates under the age of 40 if they have been or are currently serving as governor, regent, or mayor. After his nomination, Gibran, who was a PDI-P cadre, had his membership terminated, followed by his brother-in-law who is also the mayor of Medan since 2021, Bobby Nasution, after his declaration of support for Prabowo-Gibran.

2
2024 Advanced Indonesia Coalition ticket
Prabowo Subianto	Gibran Rakabuming
for President	for Vice President
Minister of Defense (2019–2024)	Mayor of Surakarta (2021–2024)
261 / 575(45%)
Campaign

==== Ganjar–Mahfud ====
The end of Joko Widodo's presidency in 2024 led the Indonesian Democratic Party of Struggle (PDI-P) to search for a presidential candidate to replace him. Central Java Governor (2013‒2023) and former member of the House of Representatives (2004‒2013), Ganjar Pranowo, was nominated for president by PDI-P. His name was announced by PDI-P Chair Megawati. Previously, there were rumours of PDI-P's nomination of Puan Maharani to be paired with Prabowo as a vice presidential candidate. Puan was eventually nominated by the party to become a legislative candidate for the House of Representatives. In addition, NasDem also nominated Ganjar's name as one of the presidential candidates in its national working meeting, although his nomination was mandated to Anies. Hanura, a non-parliamentary party, also supported Ganjar as a presidential candidate. Hanura became the first supporting party after Ganjar's nomination by PDI-P that gave birth to political cooperation without a coalition. A few days later, the United Development Party (PPP) also endorsed Ganjar. The two parties also collaborated in the legislative election. Afterwards, Perindo also nominated Ganjar amid rumours that his party would join the Great Indonesia Awakening Coalition that would later support Prabowo. Long before PDI-P endorsed Ganjar, PSI first named him as its presidential candidate and Yenny Wahid, daughter of former President Abdurrahman Wahid, as its vice president. Later, PSI cancelled its support for Ganjar following its party congress. This came after PDI-P politician Said Abdullah proposed Anies as one of Ganjar's potential running mates. This proposal was ignored by NasDem as the party that led Anies' candidacy.

On 18 October 2023, Ganjar followed Anies in announcing his running mate. Coordinating Minister for Political, Legal, and Security Affairs and former member of the House of Representatives (2004‒2008) and Chief Justice of the Constitutional Court (MK) (2008‒2013), Mahfud MD, was announced as the vice presidential candidate for Ganjar, which was announced directly by Megawati. Mahfud had previously been tapped as a running mate for Joko Widodo in 2019 before being replaced by Ma'ruf Amin in the final seconds before the announcement. That day, he had prepared a white shirt in line with Jokowi's symbolic campaign attire. The shirt was eventually worn again during the submission of the vice presidential candidate with Ganjar. The registration of this candidate pair followed Anies-Muhaimin's submission to the KPU on 19 October 2023.

3
2024 Alliance of Parties ticket
Ganjar Pranowo	Mahfud MD
for President	for Vice President
Governor of Central Java (2013–2023)	Coordinating Minister for Political, Legal, and Security Affairs (2019–2024)
147 / 575(26%)
Campaign

== General election ==
=== Campaign ===
Prior to joining Joko Widodo's government, Prabowo Subianto was known for being assertive and expressive as a reflection of his previous profession as a soldier. In each of his presidential campaigns, he criticised Jokowi's policies. Likewise, his speeches showed Prabowo's firm stance that positioned himself as part of the opposition to Jokowi. Afterwards, Prabowo appeared more cooperative, given that he was the Minister of Defence in the cabinet and made Jokowi's son and Mayor of Surakarta, Gibran as his deputy. In 2024, they expressed support for Jokowi's policies, including continuing the planning of the Nusantara Capital City as one of the national strategic projects. In his campaign, Prabowo often discussed the programme of distributing food and milk to students.

In 2024, Anies Baswedan became a new rival for Prabowo, who had previously promoted Anies as a candidate for Governor of Jakarta in 2017, just as Jokowi, who was a rival for Prabowo in the two previous presidential elections, had been promoted by Prabowo as a candidate for governor in 2012. Anies was a former cabinet minister who was dismissed by Jokowi in 2016, after which he was supported as a gubernatorial candidate by Jokowi's political opposition. He often criticised government policies in terms of bureaucracy, investment, and corruption, collusion and nepotism. During his presidential campaign, he called for a transformation of central government policies. For example, his food security programme preferred contract farming over food estates, which had been the government's programme. In addition, he accommodated the aspirations of young voters by declaring the "Bawa Idemu Movement" which is a volunteer from the regions to voice their ideas to Anies. Then, in certain forums, he was present to explain the vision and mission by opening discussions with young people.

Ganjar Pranowo pledged to continue Jokowi's development programmes to be continued if elected president. However, he initiated improvements to Jokowi's programmes and promoted a vision of accelerated development. In his campaign, he followed Jokowi's lead by conducting blusukan in traditional markets. In addition, he performed jogging exercises in public, including in Jakarta, in the hopes of achieving greater public recognition. During the campaign, Ganjar used a black shirt as a symbolic outfit in his campaign, while his deputy, Mahfud MD, wore his white shirt that had been prepared in his thwarted vice presidential bid in 2019. Later, Ganjar considered that law enforcement under Jokowi's administration was low.

On 27 November 2023, the KPU declared a peaceful campaign with the presidential and vice presidential candidate pairs and their supporting parties, as well as signing an integrity pact in maintaining safe and peaceful elections. The next day, Anies and Ganjar started their first campaign. Anies gave a speech in Tanah Merah Village, Jakarta, while his deputy Muhaimin Iskandar campaigned in Jombang, East Java, which is the base of Nahdlatul Ulama as well as his birthplace. Unlike Anies, Ganjar implemented a campaign strategy of blusukan in the western and eastern regions of Indonesia. Ganjar started in Merauke, South Papua and Mahfud visited Sabang, Aceh. While the two candidates were campaigning, Prabowo and Gibran chose to stay on duty with their positions. Gibran preceded Prabowo in campaigning on 1 December 2023 in Penjaringan, Jakarta. After that, Prabowo's first campaign was in Tasikmalaya, West Java.

=== Debates ===
Unlike in previous editions, the 2024 presidential and vice-presidential debates were attended by the candidate pairs. Five rounds of debates were held between the candidates, with participants alternating between the presidential and vice presidential candidates. The first round of debates, between the presidential candidates, was held on 12 December 2023. The second round of debates, between their running mates, was held on 22 December 2023. The third round of debates was held on 7 January 2024. The next two rounds were held on 21 January 2024 and 4 February 2024.

The first debate saw three presidential candidates debating law, bureaucracy, and the democratic system. Anies and Muhaimin appeared compactly wearing white shirts with black suits with stickers that read "AMIN" on their chests, Prabowo wore a light blue shirt in the colours of their partner Gibran and had a small pin pinned on his chest, Ganjar appeared wearing a white shirt that read "sat, set", while Mahfud wore a white shirt that read "tas, tes" with a picture of a legal scale on his left chest. During the debate on democracy, Anies and Prabowo clashed. Anies claimed that freedom of speech was still limited. Prabowo responded by dismissing the issue. He insisted that democracy under Jokowi's administration was good, and that it was thanks to the democratic process that Anies could become governor. Anies later replied that Prabowo was considered "unable to stand to be in the opposition camp" as an honourable position. Anies and Ganjar both attacked Prabowo over the Constitutional Court decision allowing Gibran to become his running mate. In response, Prabowo stated that the decision would be left to voters. Prabowo was also questioned over his alleged involvement in the kidnapping of activists in 1997–98.

For the vice presidential candidate debate, the public speculated that the debate was cancelled by the KPU, resulting in misunderstandings among the public. Previously, a debate for vice-presidential candidates was held, in which the participants were Ma'ruf Amin and Sandiaga Uno. However, the KPU denied the elimination of the debate for vice-presidential candidates, but it will present candidate pairs in the debate contest, but the participants were between presidential candidates, between vice-presidential candidates, and between candidate pairs. Thus, debates followed by vice presidential candidates proceeded in the second and fourth debates. The second debate covered the economy and infrastructure development, especially the development of IKN Nusantara. The debate participants were Muhaimin Iskandar, Gibran Rakabuming Raka and Mahfud MD.

During the debate on 21 January, Gibran Rakabuming was seen making a "ducking" gesture and pretending to search for a lost item in response to an answer from Mahfud MD, which drew mostly negative reactions online for its supposed rudeness.

== Timeline ==
The list of planned general election schedules is as follows:

Dates	Activity
29 July – 14 December 2022	Registration, verification, and determination of election participants
14 October 2022 – 9 February 2023	Determination of the number of seats and determination of constituencies
19–25 October 2023	Presidential and vice presidential registrations
28 November 2023 – 10 February 2024	Election campaign period
11–13 February 2024	Election silence period
14 February 2024	Voting day
14–15 February 2024	Vote counting
15 February – 20 March 2024	Recapitulation of vote counting results
20 October 2024	Inauguration of the president-elect and vice president-elect

The following schedule only takes place in case of a two-round presidential election

Dates	Activity
2–22 June 2024	Presidential and vice presidential campaign period
23–25 June 2024	Election silence period
26 June 2024	Voting day
26–27 June 2024	Vote counting
27 June – 20 July 2024	Recapitulation of vote counting results

== Controversies ==
=== Constitutional court and Gibran's candidacy ===
The Constitutional Court of Indonesia (MK RI) made a controversial exception, allowing Gibran to run for vice president in the 2024 election. As per the court ruling, candidates under the required age of 40 were eligible to seek the presidency or vice-presidency in the presidential ballot, given a condition that they held elected regional office in the past. Since Gibran, who is the current mayor of Surakarta, is the son of Joko Widodo, it led to speculation that the President influenced the ruling so that he could continue his legacy. It was also noted that Jokowi's brother-in-law and the Chief Justice of the MK, Anwar Usman, was also involved in the ruling. Anwar Usman was ultimately demoted by the Honorary Assembly of the Constitutional Court from the position of Chief Justice on 8 November 2023 after finding him guilty of conflict of interest on the ruling.

The KPU was also criticised for accepting Gibran's registration without following the proper procedures after the ruling from MK. Because of this on 5 February 2024, the Election Organization Ethics Council (DKPP) found that KPU chairman Hasyim Asy'ari, and all six of KPU's commissioners were guilty of an ethics violation for allowing Gibran to register his candidacy before the commission had adjusted the age minimum for candidates in its internal regulation. Hasyim Asy'ari in particular received a "final stern warning" from the DKPP while the other six only received a "stern warning". Hasyim received that particular warning was due to the fact that Hasyim has already collected two stern warnings from DKPP due to ethical breaches committed in March and April 2023.

A lawsuit was filed by the Indonesian Democracy Defenders (TPDI) and the Indonesian Advocates Movement (Perekat Nusantara) against Joko Widodo, Gibran Rakabuming, Anwar Usman and First Lady Iriana alleging nepotism and political dynasty on the part of the respondents, but was dismissed by the Jakarta State Administrative Court a day before the election.

=== Vice-presidential debate ===
Another controversy came from a widely misunderstood announcement of the KPU that the debate between vice-presidential candidates would not be held, which marked a departure from previous elections where vice-presidential candidates did debate each other on more than one occasion. However, the KPU denied the speculation and reiterated that in every debate, both presidential and vice-presidential candidates must attend every debate. This meant that the debate between vice-presidential candidates continued and that they were accompanied by their running mates and vice versa.

=== Social media usage and disinformation ===
Prabowo Subianto's campaign was noted for its efforts at rehabilitating his image from his association with human rights violations during the dictatorship of former President Suharto into a "cute and cuddly" (gemoy) grandfather figure among the youth, particularly first-time voters, going as far as to make an animated avatar of him on TikTok using artificial intelligence. Anies Baswedan's and Ganjar Pranowo's campaign also used interactive AI chatbots to engage with voters.

During the campaign, Anies Baswedan was targeted by a deepfake audio recording purportedly showing him being chastised by a political backer in January. Prabowo Subianto's campaign team used AI to depict children in a television advertisement in order to bypass laws prohibiting the appearance of minors in political advertisements.

Golkar, one of the parties supporting Prabowo for president, uploaded a viral AI-generated deepfake video on social media of a simulation of Suharto, who had died in 2008, in which he appeared to urge voters to select the party's candidates in the upcoming election. This led some civil society organizations to urge the KPU to implement regulations on the usage of artificial intelligence.

=== Allegations of state support ===
On 12 February 2024, investigative journalist Dandhy Laksono released a documentary on YouTube directed by him, titled Dirty Vote, alleging that Joko Widodo used state funds to support Prabowo Subianto's campaign, becoming viral within the day and prompting accusations of sabotage by Prabowo's campaign team. The presidential office denied the claims, while protests were held in reaction to the allegations.

=== Discrepancies in vote-counting ===
During the vote-counting, allegations emerged of votes appearing larger on the KPU-generated online application Sirekap (Recapitulation Information System) than what the actual results showed. The General Election Supervisory Agency (Bawaslu) attributed the issue to possible errors on part of the newly founded app, and welcomed an audit into Sirekap. As of 20 February, Sirekap results from 1,223 polling stations were found to be mismatched with actual results.

== Release of results ==
Official results were expected to be released in March, but quick counts from government-approved tabulators came out shortly after polling stations closed. Initial tallies from Indikator Politik, Kompas, and the Indonesian Survey Circle showed Prabowo Subianto receiving between 53.4 and 59.8 percent of votes cast, followed by Anies Baswedan, who received between 23.11 and 26.39 percent, and Ganjar Pranowo, who received between 16.72 and 17.12 percent. On 20 March, Prabowo was officially confirmed as the winner of the election by the KPU, having won about 96 million votes (59 percent), against Anies Baswedan who won 41 million (25 percent), and Ganjar Pranowo, who won 27 million (16 percent).

== Official results ==
Map of the vote share of every candidates in each districts using a continuous colour scheme

Map of the vote share of every candidates among overseas voters using a continuous colour scheme

Candidate	Running mate	Party	Votes	%
Prabowo Subianto	Gibran Rakabuming	Gerindra Party	96,214,691	58.59
Anies Baswedan	Muhaimin Iskandar	Independent	40,971,906	24.95
Ganjar Pranowo	Mahfud MD	Indonesian Democratic Party of Struggle	27,040,878	16.47
Total			164,227,475	100.00
Valid votes			164,227,475	97.51
Invalid/blank votes			4,194,536	2.49
Total votes			168,422,011	100.00
Registered voters/turnout			204,422,181	82.39
Source: KPU Turnout

=== By province ===
Region	Province							Total valid votes
Region	Province	Anies Baswedan Independent		Prabowo Subianto Gerindra		Ganjar Pranowo PDI-P		Total valid votes
Region	Province	Votes	%	Votes	%	Votes	%	Total valid votes
Sumatra	Aceh	2,369,534	73.56	787,024	24.43	64,677	2.01	3,221,235
Sumatra	North Sumatra	2,339,620	29.25	4,660,408	58.26	999,528	12.49	7,999,556
Sumatra	West Sumatra	1,744,042	56.53	1,217,314	39.45	124,044	4.02	3,085,400
Sumatra	Riau	1,400,093	37.96	1,931,113	52.35	357,298	9.69	3,688,504
Sumatra	Jambi	532,605	24.15	1,438,952	65.23	234,251	10.62	2,205,808
Sumatra	South Sumatra	997,299	18.98	3,649,651	69.47	606,681	11.55	5,253,631
Sumatra	Bengkulu	229,681	18.10	893,499	70.43	145,570	11.47	1,268,750
Sumatra	Lampung	791,892	15.49	3,554,310	69.55	764,486	14.96	5,110,688
Sumatra	Bangka Belitung	204,348	23.08	529,883	59.85	151,109	17.07	885,340
Sumatra	Riau Islands	370,671	32.15	641,388	55.64	140,733	12.21	1,152,792
Java	Banten	2,451,383	34.02	4,035,052	55.99	720,275	9.99	7,206,710
Java	Jakarta	2,653,762	41.07	2,692,011	41.67	1,115,138	17.26	6,460,911
Java	West Java	9,099,674	31.68	16,805,854	58.50	2,820,995	9.82	28,726,523
Java	Central Java	2,866,373	12.58	12,096,454	53.07	7,827,335	34.35	22,790,162
Java	Yogyakarta	496,280	19.80	1,269,265	50.63	741,220	29.57	2,506,765
Java	East Java	4,492,652	17.52	16,716,603	65.19	4,434,805	17.29	25,644,060
Kalimantan	West Kalimantan	718,641	22.34	1,964,183	61.05	534,450	16.61	3,217,274
Kalimantan	Central Kalimantan	256,811	16.98	1,097,070	72.52	158,788	10.50	1,512,669
Kalimantan	South Kalimantan	849,948	35.16	1,407,684	58.23	159,950	6.61	2,417,582
Kalimantan	East Kalimantan	448,046	20.09	1,542,346	69.15	240,143	10.76	2,230,535
Kalimantan	North Kalimantan	72,065	17.67	284,209	69.71	51,451	12.62	407,725
Lesser Sunda	Bali	99,233	3.70	1,454,640	54.26	1,127,134	42.04	2,681,007
Lesser Sunda	West Nusa Tenggara	850,539	26.20	2,154,843	66.37	241,106	7.43	3,246,488
Lesser Sunda	East Nusa Tenggara	153,446	5.27	1,798,753	61.80	958,505	32.93	2,910,704
Sulawesi	North Sulawesi	119,103	7.30	1,229,069	75.31	283,796	17.39	1,631,968
Sulawesi	Gorontalo	227,354	29.39	504,662	65.24	41,508	5.37	773,524
Sulawesi	Central Sulawesi	386,743	21.50	1,251,313	69.57	160,594	8.93	1,798,650
Sulawesi	Southeast Sulawesi	361,585	23.10	1,113,344	71.11	90,727	5.79	1,565,656
Sulawesi	West Sulawesi	223,153	27.23	533,757	65.14	62,514	7.63	819,424
Sulawesi	South Sulawesi	2,003,081	37.94	3,010,726	57.02	265,948	5.04	5,279,755
Maluku	Maluku	228,557	21.16	665,371	61.59	186,395	17.25	1,080,323
Maluku	North Maluku	200,459	26.84	454,943	60.93	91,293	12.23	746,695
Papua	Papua	67,592	10.81	378,908	60.62	178,534	28.57	625,034
Papua	West Papua	37,459	11.32	172,965	52.26	120,565	36.42	330,989
Papua	Southwest Papua	48,405	13.53	209,403	58.54	99,899	27.93	357,707
Papua	Central Papua	128,577	11.66	638,616	57.94	335,089	30.40	1,102,282
Papua	Highland Papua	284,184	21.89	838,382	64.56	175,956	13.55	1,298,522
Papua	South Papua	41,906	13.31	162,852	51.74	110,003	34.95	314,761
Overseas		125,110	18.64	427,871	63.73	118,385	17.63	671,366
Total		40,971,906	24.95	96,214,691	58.59	27,040,878	16.47	164,227,475

=== By region ===
Region							Total valid votes
Region	Anies Baswedan Independent		Prabowo Subianto Gerindra		Ganjar Pranowo PDI-P		Total valid votes
Region	Votes	%	Votes	%	Votes	%	Total valid votes
Sumatra	10,979,785	32.42	19,303,542	56.99	3,588,377	10.59	33,871,704
Java	22,060,124	23.64	53,615,239	57.44	17,659,768	18.92	93,335,131
Kalimantan	2,345,511	23.97	6,295,492	64.33	1,144,782	11.70	9,785,785
Lesser Sunda	1,103,218	12.48	5,408,236	61.19	2,326,745	26.33	8,838,199
Sulawesi	3,321,019	27.98	7,642,871	64.39	905,087	7.63	11,868,977
Maluku	429,016	23.48	1,120,314	61.32	277,688	15.20	1,827,018
Papua	608,123	15.09	2,401,126	59.59	1,020,046	25.32	4,029,295
Overseas	125,110	18.64	427,871	63.73	118,385	17.63	671,366
Total	40,971,906	24.95	96,214,691	58.59	27,040,878	16.47	164,227,475

=== Demographics ===
The research and development department of Indonesian newspaper Kompas (Litbang Kompas) conducted an exit poll, and released a demographic breakdown based on political preference.

2024 Indonesian presidential election
Social group	Anies (%)	Prabowo (%)	Ganjar (%)	No answer (%)	Lead (%)
Gender
Male	21.7	53.6	15.7	9.0	31.9
Female	22.0	55.1	13.4	9.5	33.1
Age
17–25	16.7	65.9	9.6	7.8	49.2
26–33	20.2	59.6	11.7	8.5	39.4
34–41	22.3	54.1	13.9	9.7	31.8
42–55	24.3	49.1	14.0	12.0	24.8
56–74	25.7	43.1	21.3	9.9	17.4
Education
Primary	18.8	55.6	17.4	8.2	36.8
Secondary	20.7	57.4	12.3	9.6	36.8
Higher	34.3	41.7	12.6	11.4	7.4
Social class
Lower	19.7	55.9	16.0	8.4	36.2
Lower middle	21.0	55.9	14.4	8.7	34.9
Upper middle	25.3	50.9	11.3	12.5	25.6
Upper	30.4	45.6	15.1	8.9	15.2
Religion
Islam (Nahdlatul Ulama)	21.8	55.8	12.8	9.5	34.0
Islam (Muhammadiyah)	41.9	41.6	10.6	5.9	0.3
Islam (Others)	30.1	49.5	9.8	10.6	19.4
Catholic	1.7	64.9	29.3	4.1	35.6
Protestant	1.7	56.9	32.9	8.4	24.0
Hindu	0.0	47.5	43.2	9.4	4.3
Other	7.9	50.0	26.3	15.8	23.7

== Aftermath ==
Following the results of unofficial quick counts, Prabowo claimed victory on the evening of 14 February at an event with his supporters at Istora Senayan in Jakarta, calling it "the victory of all Indonesians." Gibran Rakabuming also expressed thanks to Prabowo for "giving young people a chance." Ganjar Pranowo's campaign team said that they were investigating reports of electoral violations and alleged "structural, systematic and massive fraud" during the voting. Hasto Kristiyanto, the secretary-general of the PDI-P, said that election irregularities were enforced from the top down, beginning with the decision to allow Gibran Rakabuming Raka to run for vice president. Hamdan Zoelva, former chief justice of the Constitutional Court and a member of Anies Baswedan's campaign team also said that there were "strong indications that violations occurred in a structured, systematic and massive way in the presidential election." Remarks by independent observers indicated there were "no signs of systemic fraud." Prabowo again expressed thanks to the electorate after the official confirmation of the election results on 20 March.

The Indonesia Stock Exchange on 15 February recorded its sharpest rise in two months as quick count results indicated Prabowo's victory, which analysts attributed to the removal of political uncertainty which would arise from a runoff election. Largest gains were made by banks, nickel companies, and infrastructure firms.

In total, the Constitutional Court received 297 lawsuits related to the results of the legislative election.

=== Protests ===
Following the allegations, police said that it would allow peaceful protests. A demonstration was held in front of the Istana Merdeka in Jakarta in protest against Prabowo's claims of victory on 15 February, followed by rallies on 16 February against alleged electoral fraud and Joko Widodo's perceived support for Prabowo at the KPU headquarters. Joko Widodo dismissed the allegations of fraud, saying that evidence for fraud should be brought to Bawaslu and the Constitutional Court. On the day the official election results were finally released on 20 March, 300 demonstrators protested alleged electoral fraud and Joko Widodo's support for Prabowo outside the KPU headquarters.

On 22 April, the Constitutional Court rejected all legal challenges against the results of the presidential election, allowing the KPU to declare the Prabowo-Gibran tandem the winner.

=== Analysis ===
After the release of quick count results, Lingkaran Survei Indonesia attributed split-ticket voters to the Ganjar-Mahfud pair's poor performance despite the PDI-P's success in remaining the largest party in the legislature. Notably, Prabowo won the most votes in the traditionally PDI-P supporting provinces of Central Java and Bali. Kompas' exit polls found strong support for Prabowo's candidacy from non-Muslim voters and Nahdlatul Ulama Muslims, winning in 36 of 38 provinces (except for Aceh and West Sumatra, where the Anies-Muhaimin pair received the most votes). Anies-Muhaimin and Ganjar-Mahfud were also defeated in East Java and Central Java, respectively, even though their supporting parties (PKB and PDI-P, respectively) won the most votes in the two provinces. Prabowo also won the most votes in Bali, a traditional PDI-P stronghold, a victory attributed by analysts and Prabowo's campaign team to Jokowi's endorsement.

Nahdlatul Ulama-affiliated academic Ulil Abshar Abdalla, in a Kompas column, attributed Prabowo's strong performance to Indonesian voters prioritizing the continuation of Jokowi's policies over concerns on legal and ethical violations. On the other hand, Ganjar's campaign was described by an ISEAS – Yusof Ishak Institute analysis as being left "without a clear campaign message or identity" following Jokowi's split from PDI-P. The same researchers noted Prabowo's success in changing his popular image from a strongman in prior elections to a "cuddly grandpa" through social media campaigns in order to appeal to younger generations, and attributed Anies' defeat to the small proportion of the electoral base who were opposed to Jokowi's policies.

Of parties which qualified for the House of Representatives in 2019, Golkar gained the most in 2024, increasing the party's vote share from 12 percent to over 15 percent. Parties supporting Ganjar Pranowo – PDI-P, PPP, Hanura and Perindo – saw their vote shares decline from 2019, with PPP failing to qualify for parliament for the first time since the party's first electoral participation in the 1977 election.

== Reactions ==
=== Domestic ===
Outgoing president Joko Widodo stated that he had met and congratulated Prabowo and his own son, Gibran, on the evening of 14 February, based on quick count results. Former president Susilo Bambang Yudhoyono congratulated Prabowo and stated that he "is now his commander".

Chairman of the NasDem Party Surya Paloh in a press conference said his party accepted the results of both legislative and presidential elections and congratulated all winners of the legislative election and the Prabowo-Gibran ticket. Despite this, Paloh states that NasDem will continue to support efforts to "seek justice" regarding the election results. NasDem will also file a lawsuit against the election results, including for the election of legislative members in six electoral districts, namely three electoral districts in Sumatra, one electoral district in Papua, and two electoral districts in Java. The Prosperous Justice Party (PKS) also accepted the results with party secretary general Aboe Bakar Alhabsy expressing his happiness on its electoral gain of 3 seats. However, PKS states that the legal process for the election is still ongoing, citing the problems of using the Sirekap.

Anies Baswedan and Muhaimin Iskandar said that "It is important to safeguard the election process to ensure legitimacy, trust and inclusiveness in the results". In an apparent criticism towards Gibran Rakabuming Raka's candidacy as vice president, Anies stated that "leaders born from a process tainted with fraud and irregularities will produce a regime that produces policies full of injustice" and his team did not want this to happen. They initially rejected the results of the presidential election announced by the KPU and protested the result to the Constitutional Court. On 22 April 2024 after hearing the ruling from the Constitutional Court, Anies declared that the election was over and congratulated Prabowo and Gibran for their victory in the election.

Ganjar Pranowo's campaign legal team deputy leader Todung Mulya Lubis also stated they would protest the results to the Constitutional Court and rejecting the results of the presidential election especially on the PDI-P's stronghold provinces of Central Java, Bali, North Sulawesi and East Nusa Tenggara. Despite this, Todung Mulya Lubis stated they were not in the position to reject the whole results and only wanted to "correct the errors". PDI-P's coalition partner PPP also rejected the election results, citing discrepancies between KPU's and the party's internal results. On 22 April 2024, following the ruling from the Constitutional Court, both Ganjar Pranowo and Mahfud MD accepted the election results and congratulated Prabowo and Gibran for their electoral victory.

Grand Imam of the Istiqlal Mosque Nasaruddin Umar congratulated Prabowo and Gibran on their victory in the election and expressed hope that Indonesia will be more developed and more successful under their leadership. Nahdlatul Ulama chief Yahya Cholil Staquf congratulated Prabowo-Gibran for winning the election and all parties that won seats in the legislative election. Muhammadiyah chief Haedar Nashir had also congratulated Prabowo-Gibran, hoping that the elected pair have the spirit of a statesman in carrying out the popular mandate.

Sultan and Governor of Yogyakarta Hamengkubuwono X congratulated Prabowo-Gibran for their electoral victory and expressed hope for their successful administration.

=== International ===
==== Asia ====
- Cambodia – Prime Minister Hun Manet congratulated Prabowo through a congratulatory message.
- China – Chinese Ambassador to Indonesia Lu Kang visited Prabowo's home on 18 February and personally congratulated him over the election results while expressing hope that "Indonesia and China can grow together, prosper together". On 20 March, President Xi Jinping delivered a congratulatory message to Prabowo for his victory and said that he looked forward to meet with him and work together with his administration. This letter was delivered by Chinese Ambassador to Indonesia Lu Kang. Foreign Minister Wang Yi congratulated Prabowo for his win during an official visit to the Ministry of Defense of Indonesia in Jakarta.
- East Timor – President José Ramos-Horta congratulated Prabowo through a phone call on 19 February. Prime Minister Xanana Gusmao congratulated Prabowo through a letter, hopeful that Prabowo's wisdom and experience will make him a great president and wished for stronger bilateral relationship and cooperation in areas of mutual interest.
- India – Prime Minister Narendra Modi congratulated the Indonesian people for the successful election and Prabowo for his victory on social media. Modi said he hoped to be able to work with the new president to strengthen the comprehensive strategic partnership between the two nation. Modi also sent a congratulatory letter to Prabowo which was delivered by Indian Ambassador to Indonesia Sandeep Chakravorty during his official visit to the Ministry of Defense of Indonesia on 8 May.
- Iran – President Ebrahim Raisi delivered a congratulatory message to Prabowo for being elected president based on the election results. He also stated his hope for both countries to have collaborative efforts, mutual understanding, and shared endeavours under Prabowo's presidency.
- Japan – Prime Minister Fumio Kishida delivered a congratulatory message to Prabowo and expressed his desire to encourage bilateral cooperation in handling regional and international situations.
- Jordan – King Abdullah II congratulated Prabowo through a phone call based on the projected results. He also stated that Prabowo was needed by Indonesia and expressed his readiness to receive him in Jordan.
- Malaysia – Prime Minister Anwar Ibrahim congratulated Prabowo for his victory in the election in a phone call and stated in his Twitter account that he was the first leader to congratulate him. He expressed belief that Prabowo can carry out the given mandate with excellence. On 4 April, Defense Minister Mohamed Khaled Nordin congratulated Prabowo during Prabowo's visit in Malaysia, expressing hopes that bilateral relationship between both nations can be brought into greater heights, especially when Malaysia is already familiar with Prabowo who was educated in Malaysia during his youth. Apart from that, Malaysia Deputy Prime Minister Ahmad Zahid Hamidi and former 9th Malaysian Prime Minister Ismail Sabri Yaakob also congratulated Prabowo as president-elect.
- Palestine – President Mahmoud Abbas delivered a congratulatory message to Prabowo on winning the presidential election and expressed the commitment to working together towards further development and cooperation. He also stated Palestine's appreciation for Indonesia's steadfast support for the Palestinian cause and its people. The message was delivered by the Embassy of Palestine in Jakarta.
- Philippines – President Bongbong Marcos congratulated Prabowo for his commanding lead in the latest electoral count to be president on social media. He also stated that he looked forward to deepening bilateral ties, especially in the upcoming celebration of 75 years of diplomatic relations between Indonesia and the Philippines.
- Saudi Arabia – King Salman of Saudi Arabia sent a cable of congratulations to Prabowo Subianto for winning the elections and wished him success. Prince Mohammed bin Salman also sent a cable to Prabowo expressing his congratulations.
- Singapore – President Tharman Shanmugaratnam congratulated Prabowo and stated that his strong mandate demonstrated the confidence and trust of the Indonesian people in his leadership. Prime Minister Lee Hsien Loong congratulated Prabowo for his apparent victory, and congratulated Jokowi for the "smooth and successful conduct" of the election. He also stated that he valued Prabowo's goodwill and friendship, and appreciated his insights. Foreign Minister Vivian Balakrishnan congratulated Prabowo on his electoral victory on behalf of the Singaporean government, calling Prabowo a steadfast friend of Singapore.
- South Korea – President Yoon Suk Yeol called Prabowo to congratulate him for winning the election. He also requested support for strengthening bilateral cooperation in various sectors and expressed hope for further efforts in spearheading freedom, peace and prosperity with Indonesia, considered one of South Korea's key partners in the Korea-ASEAN Solidarity Initiative (KASI).
- Sri Lanka – President Ranil Wickremesinghe congratulated Prabowo for his victory in the election through a phone call.
- Taiwan – President Tsai Ing-wen and Vice President Lai Ching-te congratulated Prabowo on his election victory through the Foreign Ministry. The ministry stated Indonesia and Taiwan shared the same democratic and liberal values and hoped to deepen bilateral ties with Indonesia under Prabowo.
- Thailand – Prime Minister Srettha Thavisin congratulated Prabowo for his victory on social media. He expressed hope to strengthen bilateral relations.
- Turkey – President Recep Tayyip Erdoğan delivered a congratulatory message to Prabowo following the election and expressed hope that the results will be auspicious. The message was delivered to Prabowo by Turkish Ambassador to Indonesia Talip Küçükcan. Erdoğan also called Prabowo personally to congratulate him for winning the election.
- United Arab Emirates – President Mohammed bin Zayed Al Nahyan congratulated Prabowo by phone call following the election results.
- Vietnam – Acting President Vo Thi Anh Xuan and Prime Minister Pham Minh Chinh cabled messages of congratulations to Prabowo Subianto upon his election as President of the Republic of Indonesia.

==== Australasia & Oceania ====
- Australia – Foreign Minister Penny Wong said that the Australian government was looking "forward to working closely with the next president" when he is inaugurated. Prime Minister Anthony Albanese called Prabowo on 15 February, tweeting that he was "the first foreign leader to speak today with Prabowo, who has a clear lead in official and unofficial counts". On 23 February, Deputy Prime Minister and Minister of Defense Richard Marles personally congratulated Prabowo during his official visit to the Ministry of Defense of Indonesia in Jakarta.
- New Zealand – Deputy Prime Minister and Foreign Minister Winston Peters congratulated Prabowo through his Twitter account and said he looked forward to strengthen comprehensive partnership between both nations.

==== Africa ====
- Tanzania - President Samia Suluhu Hassan congratulated Prabowo as the elected president of Indonesia in her Twitter account. She said that the results of the election is very important for Prabowo and Indonesia and the results is a proof of trust. She then expressed that Tanzania will continue to cooperate with Indonesia.

==== Europe ====
- Czech Republic – Prime Minister Petr Fiala congratulated Prabowo on social media and stated "readiness to strengthen bilateral relations".
- France – President Emmanuel Macron congratulated Prabowo through a phone call and expressed his hope to celebrate 75 years of diplomatic relations between France and Indonesia.
- Germany – Chancellor Olaf Scholz congratulated Prabowo for his victory and welcomed the opportunity to further developed the strategic partnership between Indonesia and Germany in peace and security, economic cooperation, and shared commitment against climate change.
- Hungary – Prime Minister Viktor Orban congratulated Prabowo for his victory and hoped for better bilateral relations between both nations. The letter was delivered to Prabowo by Hungarian Ambassador to Indonesia Lilla Karsay.
- Netherlands – Prime Minister Mark Rutte congratulated Prabowo following the projected outcome of the elections on social media. He also stated that he is looking forward to continuing to develop the friendship and strong bond between their countries.
- Russia – President Vladimir Putin congratulated Prabowo on his election win and expressed confidence that Prabowo's administration would contribute to the further development of relations between their countries and strengthening security and stability in the Asia-Pacific region.
- Serbia – President Aleksandar Vučić congratulated Prabowo through a phone call on 22 February.
- Spain – Prime Minister Pedro Sánchez delivered a congratulatory letter to Prabowo following the election results and expressed confidence in Prabowo's experience and good performance to lead Indonesia in the future. The letter was delivered to Prabowo by Spanish Ambassador to Indonesia Francisco de Asis Aguilera Aranda.
- Switzerland – President Viola Amherd delivered a congratulatory letter to Prabowo for his electoral victory as the eighth president of Indonesia. The letter was delivered by Swiss Ambassador to Indonesia Olivier Zehnder.
- Ukraine – President Volodymyr Zelenskyy congratulated Prabowo by phone call following the election results and invited him to an upcoming summit on Ukraine's peace formula in Switzerland in April.
- United Kingdom – Prime Minister Rishi Sunak delivered a congratulatory message to Prabowo on his electoral victory. The message was delivered to Prabowo's home by UK Ambassador to Indonesia Dominic Jermey. Jermey also congratulated "hundreds of thousands of candidates who campaigned across the archipelago" and hailed the election as "a truly epic festival of democracy". Foreign Minister and Former Prime Minister David Cameron congratulated Prabowo for his victory through his social media account, hoping to develop a genuine strategic partnership in the years ahead.

==== Americas ====
- Canada - Prime Minister Justin Trudeau called Prabowo to congratulate him on his victory in the election and applauded the Indonesian people for their strong turnout and continued commitment to democracy. Trudeau said he looked forward to further strengthening the partnership between Canada and Indonesia after Prabowo takes office and also thanked outgoing President Joko Widodo for his partnership and contributions. Prabowo also expressed his admiration of Trudeau's father, former Canadian Prime Minister Pierre Trudeau.
- Nicaragua – President Daniel Ortega and Vice President Rosario Murillo congratulated Prabowo and said they hoped to strengthen ties between both countries.
- United States – State Department spokesman Matthew Miller congratulated the Indonesian people "for their robust turnout" in the election, calling it "a testament to the durability and strength of the Indonesian people's commitment to the democratic process and electoral institutions". When asked why the White House had yet to congratulate Prabowo on his victory, US National Security Council Communications Advisor John Kirby said a statement would be released at an appropriate time and will respect the will of the Indonesian people. On 12 March, President Joe Biden delivered a congratulatory letter to Prabowo on his electoral victory which was delivered by US Ambassador to ASEAN Yohannes Abraham. He congratulated the Indonesian people for their successful election, calling it "a testament for commitment to democracy" and he looked forward to strengthening Indonesia–United States relations further. On 22 March, Biden personally called Prabowo to congratulate him for winning the election. Secretary of State Antony Blinken also congratulated Prabowo on his victory and said that he looked forward to partnering closely with the incoming government. Secretary of Defense Lloyd Austin congratulated Prabowo for his election victory via a phone call, reiterating he importance of maintaining the international rules and norms that preserve a free and open Indo-Pacific region.

Aside from Prabowo, Vice President-elect Gibran Rakabuming Raka also received words of congratulations from foreign government officials.

== See also ==
- 2024 Indonesian legislative election
