= Party of Change =

Political party in Indonesia

Party of Change Partai Perubahan
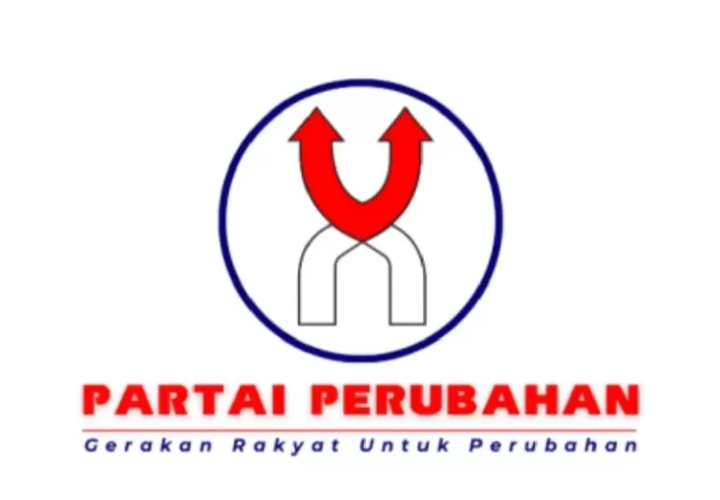
- Abbreviation: PP
- President: Muhammad Ghufran
- Secretary-General: Lucky C. Gugat, SE., MM.
- Founded: 10 November 2024; 17 months ago
- Preceded by: Coalition of Change (de facto)
- Headquarters: Duren Sawit, East Jakarta, Jakarta
- Membership (2024): 1,300
- Ideology: Pancasila; Constitutionalism; Factions: Social democracy Post-Islamism; Progressivism
- Political position: Big tent
- Slogan: DARI RAKYAT OLEH RAKYAT UNTUK SEMESTA (FROM PEOPLE BY PEOPLE FOR ALL)
- Anthem: Hymn and March Party of Change

Website
- https://gerakanperubahanindonesia.com/

The Party of Change (Indonesian: Partai Perubahan, PP) is a political party in Indonesia. It was founded on 10 November 2024. The party is a grassroots-based that adheres to Pancasila and the 1945 Constitution. This party was established by around 1,300 volunteers of Anies Baswedan who are spread across Indonesia.

The party is currently led by Muhammad Ghufran for the 2025-2030 term, elected at the National Consultative Meeting on November 10, 2025, by the Formation Team representing the major islands of Indonesia. Previously, the party was led by Robi Nurhadi. H. Robi Nurhadi, S.IP, M.Si, who was appointed as the Party President in 2024. This party was founded by approximately 1,300 Anies Baswedan volunteers spread throughout Indonesia.

The Party of Change's Tactical Vision is "People First, Nation and State Advancing," while its Tactical Mission is "Tritura Perubahan," namely: Lower Prices, Eradicate Corruption, Collusion, and Nepotism, and Uphold the Four Pillars of Nationality.

These founders were volunteers for Anies Baswedan in both the 2017 regional head elections (Pilkada) and the 2024 Indonesian presidential election.

Several days after the announcement of the winner of the 2024 Indonesian Presidential Election, on April 27, 2024, the volunteers agreed to form the National and Regional Committees for the Establishment of the Change Party. However, it wasn't just a party; it was also five pillars that were promoted in a movement called the Change Movement.

Ultimately, the six-month struggle became a historic milestone, motivating the declaration of the Change Party and the five pillars of the Change Movement, coinciding with Heroes' Day, November 10, 2024. This was done not only to commemorate fallen heroes but also to commemorate the services of living and future heroes in realizing positive change in Indonesia.

President of the Change Party, Dr. H. Robi Nurhadi, SIP, M.Si, also mentioned that the party's committee structure had been formed on April 27, 2024. There are around 1300 people who participated in the founding and are spread throughout Indonesia.
