= Prabowo Subianto 2024 presidential campaign =

Indonesian political campaign

Prabowo Subianto for President
- Campaign: 2024 Indonesian presidential election
- Candidate: Prabowo Subianto; Chairman of Gerindra (2014–present); Minister of Defense (2019–2024); Gibran Rakabuming Raka; Mayor of Surakarta (2021–2024)
- Affiliation: Advanced Indonesia Coalition
- Status: Registered: 25 October 2023; Authorized: 13 November 2023; Won election: 20 March 2024; Inaugurated: 20 October 2024
- Key people: Chief executive: Rosan Roeslani; Secretary: Nusron Wahid
- Slogans: Bersama Indonesia Maju (Together Indonesia Advances); Menuju Indonesia Emas (Towards a Golden Indonesia)

Website
- prabowogibran2.id

Prabowo Subianto's presidential campaign in 2024 supported his third bid for the presidency of Indonesia in the 2024 Indonesian presidential election, following his losses to Joko Widodo in the 2014 and 2019 Indonesian presidential election, respectively.

== Timeline ==
=== Pre-registration ===
For his third bid, Prabowo's party, Gerindra, formed a coalition with the National Awakening Party on 18 June 2022. The coalition was named the Great Indonesia Awakening Coalition (Indonesian: Koalisi Kebangkitan Indonesia Raya, abbrev: KKIR). On 7 January 2023, the office exercised his presidential campaign' mission, named as Gerindra Presidential Election-winning Agency, was inaugurated. On 23 January 2023, the coalition joint secretariat was inaugurated.

On 28 August 2023, the coalition was renamed to Advanced Indonesia Coalition (Indonesian: Koalisi Indonesia Maju, abbrev: KIM), having a similar name to his previous rival Joko Widodo's coalition, the Onward Indonesia Coalition (Indonesian: Koalisi Indonesia Maju, abbrev: KIM). Muhaimin Iskandar, chairman of National Awakening Party, unaware of this change, concluded that KKIR is now technically disbanded on 29 August 2023. Then, the National Awakening Party withdrew their supports to Prabowo Subianto on 1 September 2023, and instead, declared support for his rival, Anies Baswedan, with Muhaimin Iskandar declared as Anies Baswedan's running mate for vice president by joining the rival Coalition of Change for Unity (Indonesian: Koalisi Perubahan untuk Persatuan, abbrev: KPP) on 2 September 2023.

=== Running mate ===
Politicians named as possible running mates to Prabowo included Minister of State-owned Enterprises Erick Thohir, Coordinating Minister for Economic Affairs Airlangga Hartarto, and Governor of West Java Ridwan Kamil. Following the Constitutional Court of Indonesia's controversial ruling in October, Joko Widodo's son and mayor of Surakarta Gibran Rakabuming Raka received Golkar's endorsement as Prabowo's running mate. On 22 October 2023, Prabowo officially announced that Gibran would become his running mate.

== Coalition parties ==
- Gerindra Party
- Golkar Party
- Democratic Party
- National Mandate Party (PAN)
- Crescent Star Party (PBB)
- Garuda Party
- Indonesian People's Wave Party (Gelora)
- Indonesian Solidarity Party (PSI)

Withdrawn support:

- National Awakening Party (PKB) – withdrawn on 1 September 2023.

== Positions ==
- Prabowo endorsed a free lunch program for Indonesian children, which would target over 80 million.
- The campaign supported a continuation of Joko Widodo administration's natural resource downstreaming policies.

== Controversies ==
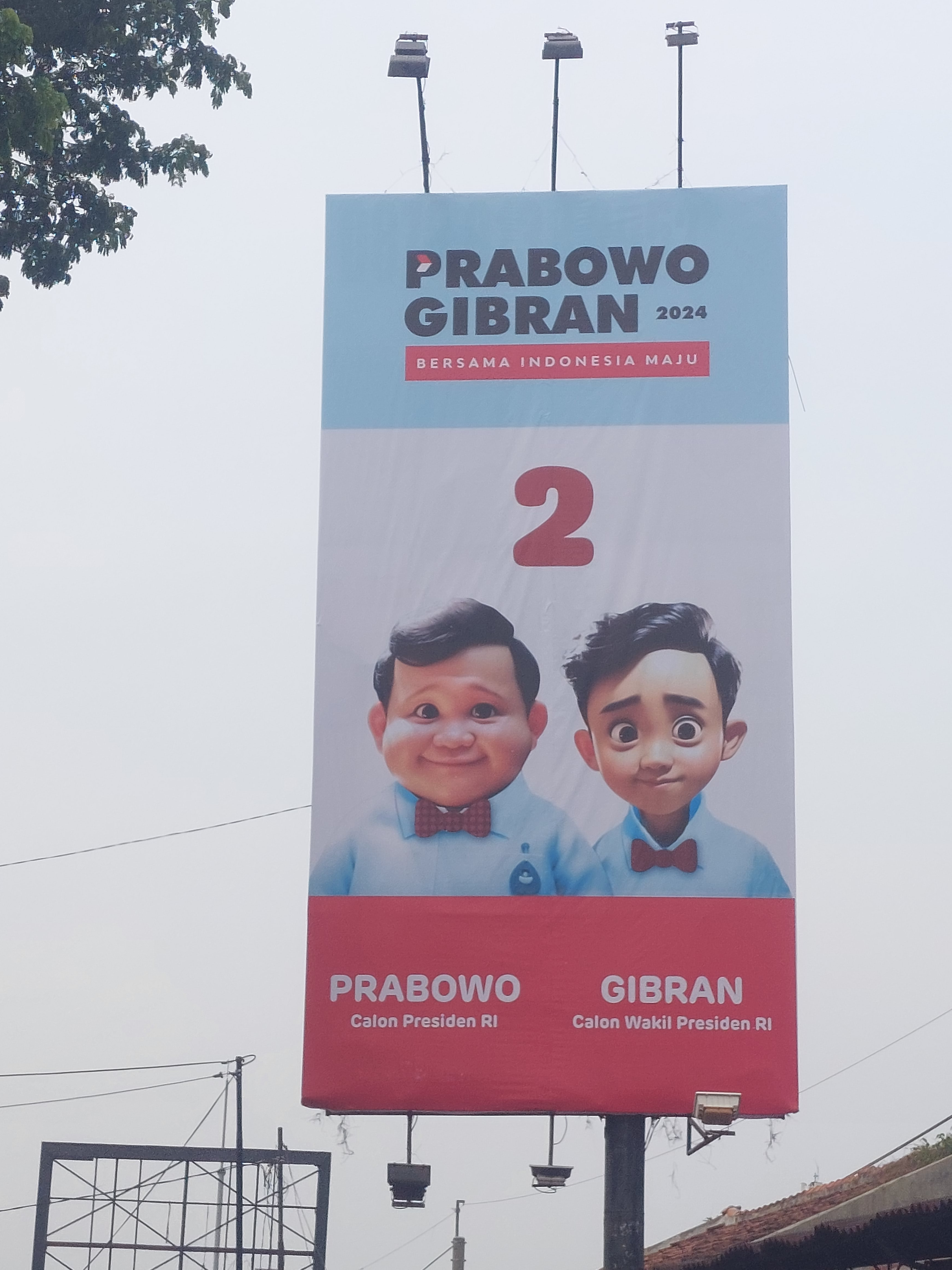
Prabowo‐Gibran AI-generated portrait campaign billboard (taken on 24 November 2023)

Its controversial presidential campaign advertisement was reported by Indonesian Democracy Radar to Bawaslu (GESA) on 20 November 2023 due to alleged violations. The advertisement was first aired on 14 November, the day when presidential serial numbers were drawn, two weeks just prior campaign start on 28 November. Also, the advertisement appears to feature children, although the campaign team claimed that those images were made by artificial intelligence. The Indonesian Children's Protection Commission (KPAI) responded to the advertisement as a misuse.

On 12 December, Prabowo went viral after his commentary about Anies Baswedan ethics by said "ndasmu etik" (English: Ethics, your animal head!) which is considered insulting him. His spokesperson later stated that it was just a joke.

On 26 December 2023, during his visit to Aceh, Prabowo stated that Indonesian government must pay attention to the interests of the people who still live under welfare rather than Rohingya refugees.

=== Logistics ===
Prabowo Subianto's campaign spent 207 billion Indonesian rupiahs (13.22 million 2024 US dollars), ahead of Anies Baswedan 2024 presidential campaign of 49 billion rupiahs but behind Ganjar Pranowo 2024 presidential campaign spendings of 506 billion rupiahs.

== See also ==
- Prabowo Subianto 2014 presidential campaign
- Prabowo Subianto 2019 presidential campaign
