= Ummah Party =

Political party in Indonesia

Ummah Party Partai Ummat
- Leader of the Shura Council: Amien Rais
- General Chairman: Ridho Rahmadi
- Secretary-General: Taufik Hidayat
- Founded: 29 April 2021; 5 years ago
- Split from: National Mandate Party
- Headquarters: Jakarta
- Youth wing: Garda Ummat (Guard of the Ummah); Laskar Ummat (Army of the Ummah); Kabah Ummat (Kaaba of the Ummah)
- Women's wing: Permata Ummat (Gems of the Ummah)
- Ideology: Pancasila; Democracy; Islamism; Religious conservatism Anti-secularism; Religious nationalism Panislamism; Islamic fundamentalism Right-wing populism Faction: Religious pluralism
- Political position: Right-wing to Far-right; Faction: Centre-right
- National affiliation: Coalition of Change for Unity (2023–2024); Advanced Indonesia Coalition Plus (since 2024)
- Slogan: Lawan Kezaliman, Tegakkan Keadilan (Fight Tyranny, Uphold Justice) (Note: This is the official English translation as used on one of their promotional materials, the literal translation would be 'Oppose Injustice, Uphold Justice'.)
- Anthem: Mars Partai Ummat (Ummah Party March)
- Ballot number: 24
- DPR seats: 0 / 580
- DPRD I seats: 0 / 2,372
- DPRD II seats: 20 / 17,510

Website
- partaiummat.id

The Ummah Party (Indonesian: Partai Ummat), is a political party in Indonesia. Party formation was announced on 1 October 2020 and the party was officially established on 29 April 2021.

The party was founded by former chairman of the National Mandate Party's advisory board, Amien Rais. Amien, an Islamic modernist-turned-Islamic conservative, became chairman after an internal rift in the party over support for Jokowi's administration.

The party aimed to attract Islamic populists, whose presence heightened during the Aksi Bela Islam period. The party, despite claiming to be a "Pancasila-based party", recruited many notable Islamic right-wing figures within their rank and carried out Islamic right-wing agendas.

Ansufri Idrus Sambo, former "Spiritual Teacher" of Prabowo Subianto, leader of Garda 212 and former Presidium Alumni 212 leader, is one of the many Indonesian Islamic right-wing figures who joined the party. The Garda 212 is an unofficial political tool intended for Aksi Bela Islam alumni, but succeeded in providing channels and support for the alumni to become legislative candidates during 2019 Indonesian general election. The organization is also notable for launching numerous Islamic populist themed conspiracy theories, including one which claimed that the 2018 Surabaya bombings were a false flag attack.

== Ideology ==
The party describes itself as engaging in identity politics while aligning with Pancasila values, and opposes secularism on the grounds that politics without religion will lose directions.

Ummah Party strongly criticized the Chinese presence in Indonesia, at one point claimed that China is attempting to invade Indonesia through the construction of the new Indonesian capital city Nusantara. Its manifesto film Harapan Ummat ("Hope of the Ummah") also depicted a truck carrying rice imported from China as a "colossal injustice". The party also advocates sharia in Indonesia.

== History ==
=== 2024 election ===
The party initially registered to participate in the 2024 Indonesian general election, but failed to qualify. The party proceeded to launch a successful lawsuit against the General Elections Commission, leading to a reverification which found the party eligible to participate. Ummah was officially entered into the list of participating parties in the election on 30 December 2022, while other parties were entered on 14 December. Ummah received a ballot number of 24. The party won 642,545 votes (0.42%) at the national legislative election and did not qualify for the national House of Representatives. It won several seats at municipal legislatures, such as at the regencies of Bantul, Lamongan, and Jayapura, and the city of Padang.

=== February 2022 crackdown ===
On 10 February 2022 at 9:15 AM, an Ummah Party cadre of the Bengkulu province branch was arrested by Densus 88 for allegations of terrorism. It was found that he had declared allegiance to Jemaah Islamiyah (JI) since 1999 and was a direct disciple of Abu Bakar Ba'asyir and Abdullah Sungkar in 1993. Spokesman for Ummah Party, Mustofa Nahrawardaya proposed the government to evaluate the working procedures of Densus 88 in order to not become a terror among the public. Ummah Party also gave legal assistance to its arrested member and stated that the party will never deactivate his membership status. The captured member was member of the Bengkulu branch of the Indonesian Ulema Council. He was captured along with another member of the council. The capture further added the list of uncovered JI agents which spread to legal political party and state-sponsored religious agency. While the party defended its arrested member, the arrest was praised by the National Mandate Party, Nasdem, and the Indonesian Solidarity Party. The unusual move of the Ummah Party also attracted attention of social activist Islah Bahrawi. He further accused that the Ummah Party is a terror organization disguised as a political party or a front organization housing terrorist activity, citing a JI issued work, stating that to succeed their "long-term struggle strategy" they must implant their agents and cadres to sit in strategic positions in government, political and religious organizations, and businesses in hope facilitating the establishment of Islamic state in Indonesia.

=== Merger of Indonesian People's Da'wah Party ===
On 16 March 2025, during the 4th anniversary of Ummah Party, Indonesian People's Da'wah Party (PDRI) through its founder Farid Okbah officially announced merger with the former party. He previously considered this plan on 9 December 2024 during the Nationality and Ummah Discussion, which was attended by several Islamist political parties.

=== Resignation of Ridho Rahmadi ===
Ridho Rahmadi made a resignation from his position as the chairman of Ummah Party, and this change of leadership was accepted by the party's 8th Shura Assembly Forum on 26 August 2026. As a result, Ansufri Idrus Sambo subsequently became the acting chairman.

== Election results ==
=== Legislative election results ===
Election	Ballot number	Leader	Seats		Votes		Outcome of election
Election	Ballot number	Leader	No.	±	Total	%	Outcome of election
2024	24	Ridho Rahmadi	0 / 580		642,550	0.42%	Coalition supply

=== Presidential election results ===
Election	Ballot number	Candidate	Running mate	1st round (Total votes)	Share of votes	Outcome	2nd round (Total votes)	Share of votes	Outcome
2024	1	Anies Baswedan	Muhaimin Iskandar	40,971,906	24.95%	Lost			
