= 2024 Konawe regency election =

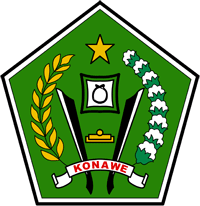
- 27 November 2024
- Turnout: 87.9%
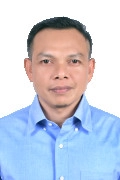

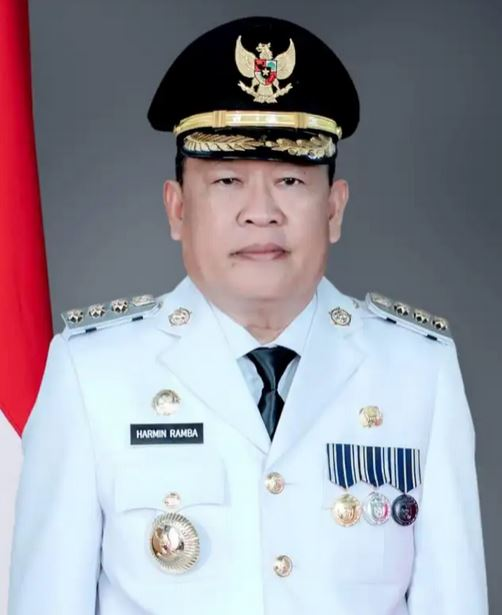

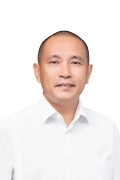
Candidate	Yusran Akbar	Harmin Ramba	Rusdianto
Party	PAN	NasDem	PDI-P
Running mate	Syamsul Ibrahim	Dessy Indah Rachmat	Fachry Pahlevi Konggoasa
Popular vote	64,296	54,967	36,476
Percentage	41.28%	35.29%	23.42%
Regent before election
Stanley (act.)
Independent
Elected Regent
Yusran Akbar
PAN

The 2024 Konawe regency election was held on 27 November 2024 as part of nationwide local elections to elect the regent of Konawe Regency, Southeast Sulawesi for a five-year term. The previous election was held in 2018. Konawe's regent from 2013 to 2023, Kery Saiful Konggoasa, was not allowed to run due to term limits. National Mandate Party member and local businessman Yusran Akbar defeated two other candidates, winning 41.3 percent of votes.

== Electoral system ==
The election, like other local elections in 2024, follow the first-past-the-post system where the candidate with the most votes wins the election, even if they do not win a majority. It is possible for a candidate to run uncontested, in which case the candidate is still required to win a majority of votes "against" an "empty box" option. Should the candidate fail to do so, the election will be repeated on a later date.

== Candidates ==
According to electoral regulations, candidates were required to secure the support of a political party or a coalition of parties which collectively won at least 10 percent of votes in the 2024 legislative election for the municipal legislature, i.e. at least 15,700 votes total. Candidates could alternatively run as an independent without party endorsement by collecting photocopies of identity cards, but no independent candidates registered in Konawe.

The National Mandate Party (PAN) endorsed Yusran Akbar, incumbent chairman of Konawe's chamber of commerce. As his running mate was Syamsul Ibrahim, a three-term PAN municipal legislator. Akbar and Ibrahim received the endorsements of nine political parties, including PAN, PKS, and Golkar. The Indonesian Democratic Party of Struggle endorsed the deputy speaker of the municipal legislature, Rusdianto, with his running mate being 2019–2024 House of Representatives member Fachry Pahlevi Konggoasa. Konggoasa is also the son of the previous regent, Kery Saiful Konggoasa. Rusdianto had also chaired Konawe's chamber of commerce from 2016 to 2021. The third candidate, Harmin Ramba, is a civil servant who was appointed as acting regent of Konawe from September 2023 to July 2024 (when he resigned to run in the election). His running mate was Dessy Indah Rachmat. He joined the Gerindra party to run in the election and was appointed the party's chairman in Konawe.

== Results ==
Candidate	Running mate	Candidate party	Votes	%
Yusran Akbar	Syamsul Ibrahim	PAN	64,296	41.28
Harmin Ramba	Dessy Indah Rachmat	Gerindra	54,967	35.29
Rusdianto	Fachry Pahlevi Konggoasa	PDI-P	36,476	23.42
Total			155,739	100.00
Valid votes			155,739	97.47
Invalid/blank votes			4,047	2.53
Total votes			159,786	100.00
Registered voters/turnout			181,858	87.86

Akbar and Ibrahim were sworn in on 20 February 2025 along with most other regional leaders elected in 2024.
