= Ridho Rahmadi =

Indonesian politician and computer scientist

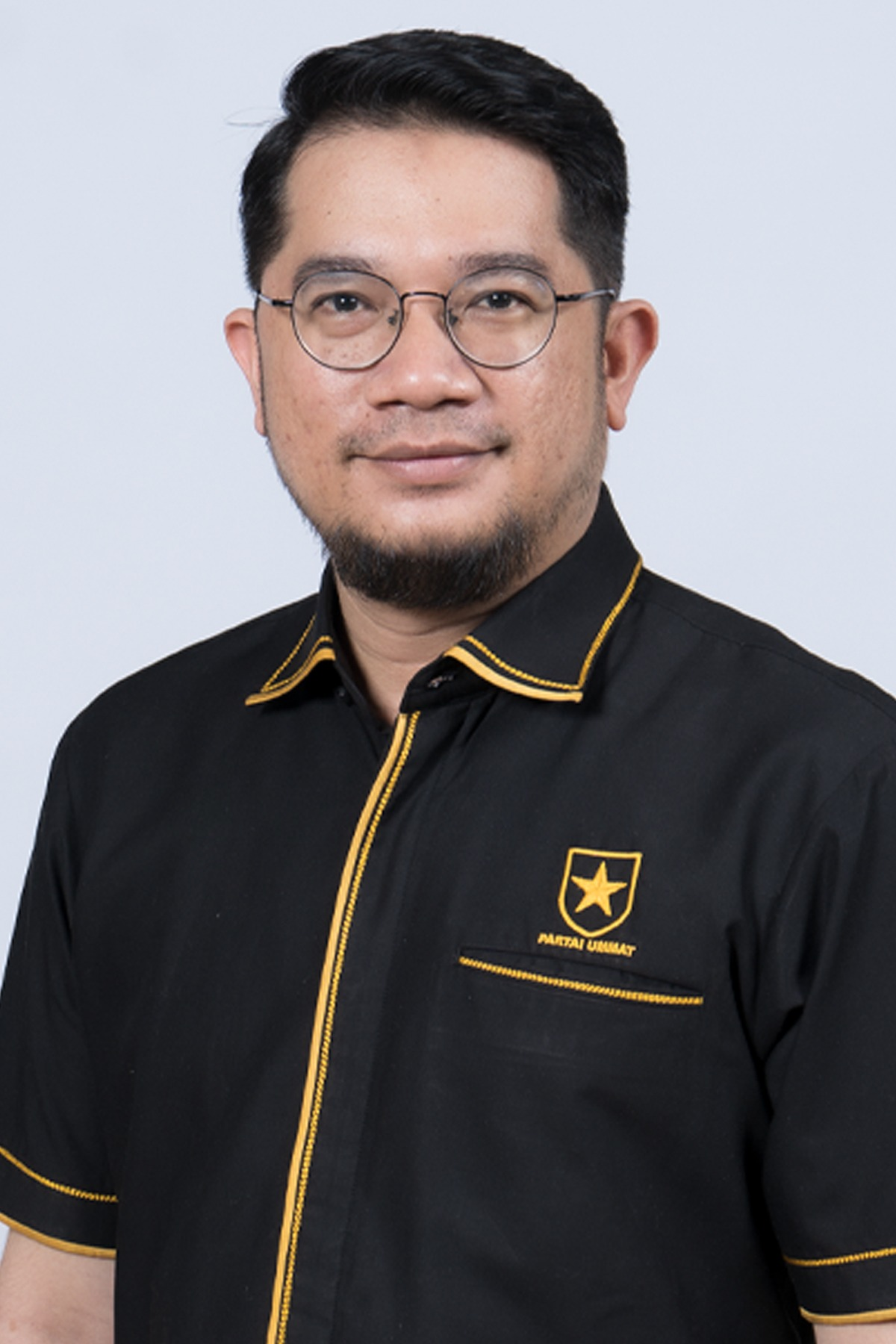

Chairman of Ummat Party
- Incumbent
- Assumed office 29 April 2021
- Preceded by: Position created

Personal details
- Born: 13 April 1985 (age 41) Yogyakarta, Indonesia
- Education: Radboud University; Johannes Kepler University Linz; Islamic University of Indonesia

Ridho Rahmadi (born 13 April 1985) is an Indonesian politician, computer scientist and academic who is the current chairman of the Ummat Party, serving since the party's founding in 2021. He is the son-in-law of the party's founder Amien Rais.

== Early life and education ==
Rahmadi was born on 13 April 1985 in Yogyakarta. He first received a bachelors in computer science from the Islamic University of Indonesia (UII) in 2007, before studying at the Johannes Kepler University, Linz (graduated 2012) and at the Czech Technical University for his masters. He then received his doctorate from Radboud University in Nijmegen, Netherlands in 2019, having started his program in 2013. During his doctoral studies, he was also a visiting researcher at Carnegie Mellon University for several months in 2017. His research focus was in artificial intelligence, with his doctoral thesis being titled Finding stable causal structures from clinical data.

== Career ==
Rahmadi began teaching at his old alma mater UII starting in 2009. In 2018, he established a Center of Data Science at UII.

On 29 April 2021, he was named as the chairman of the Ummat Party upon its foundation, at the age of 36. Due to this appointment, he resigned from his academic post at UII. He was son-in-law of the party's founder Amien Rais. According to Rahmadi in a 2022 interview, he had helped setting up the party's technological backend during leaves from his overseas studies, developing polling and survey apps. Shortly prior to Ummat's formal declaration, with the party's chairman yet to be determined, Rahmadi stated that he was offered the post of chairman without prior negotiations, and he accepted the post. His first speech following his appointment as party chairman called for national investment into information technology and artificial intelligence. Before Kaesang Pangarep was chosen as the leader of the PSI, he is the youngest of the leaders of political parties participating in the 2024 Indonesian general election.

In the 2024 election itself, Rahmadi ran as an Ummat candidate for the House of Representatives in West Sumatra's 2nd electoral district, and obtained 10,046 votes. He failed to win a seat, as Ummat did not qualify for a seat due to the 4% national parliamentary threshold.

== Personal life ==
Rahmadi is married to Tasniem Fauzia Rais, daughter of Amien Rais. Rahmadi and Tasniem had attended the same middle school in Yogyakarta, with Rahmadi being Tasniem's senior. By 2016, the couple had two children.
