= Regional House of Representatives =

Regional legislature in Indonesia

Regional House of Representatives Dewan Perwakilan Rakyat Daerah
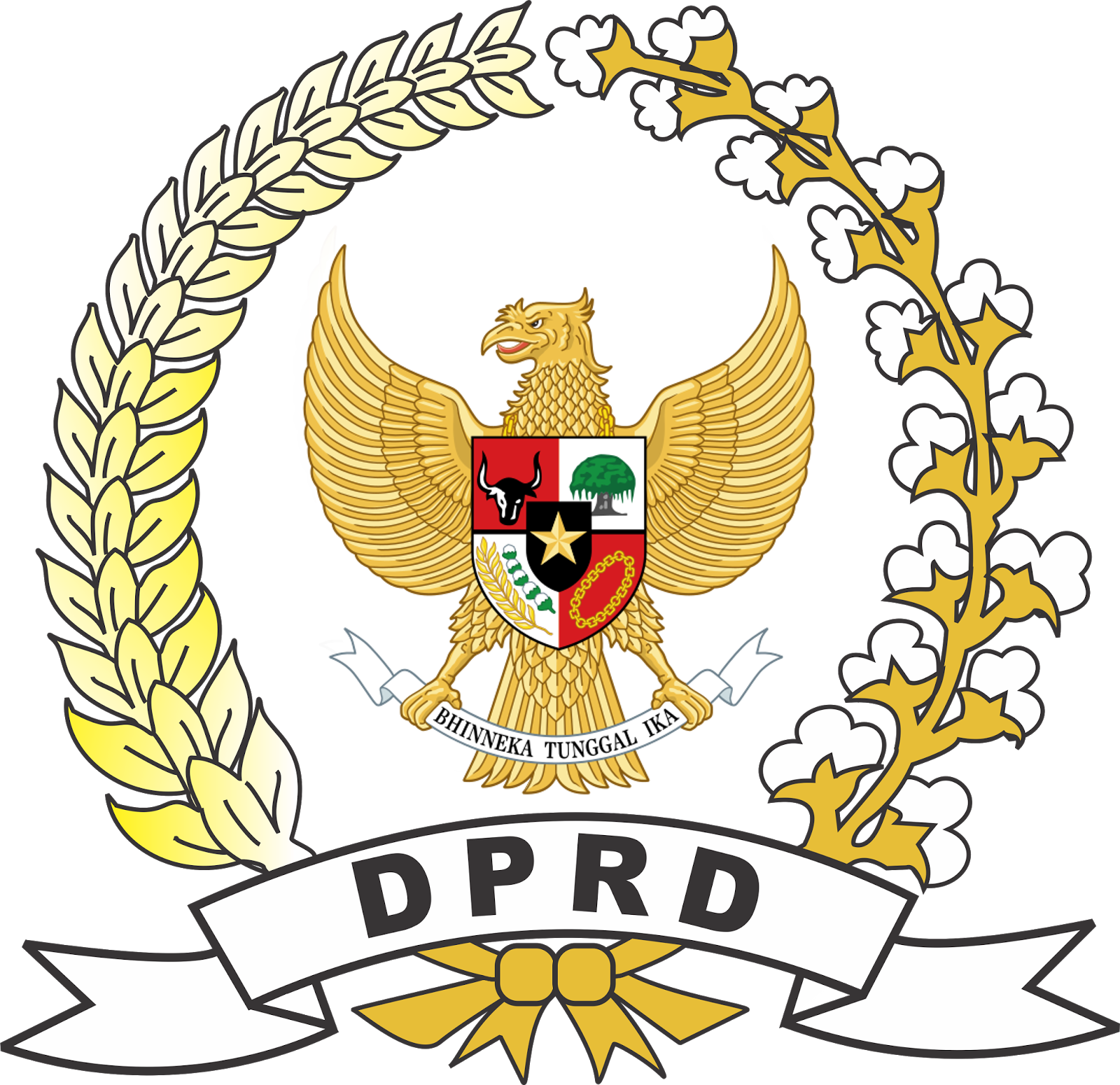

Type
- Type: Unicameral
- Term limits: 5 years

Structure
- Seats: 2024: 2,372 in DPRD I (Provincial); 17,510 in DPRD II (Regency/City); Total: 19.882
- DPRD I political groups: List: PDI-P (389) Golkar (363) Gerindra (322) NasDem (265) PKB (220) PKS (214) Democratic (207) PAN (159) PPP (82) Hanura (42) PSI (32) Perindo (31) PBB (12) PKN (4) Garuda (3) Gelora (1) Aceh's local parties (26); PA (20); PASA (4); PNA (1); PDA (1) Otsus Papua (60)
- DPRD II political groups: List: PDI-P (2.803) Golkar (2.412) Gerindra (1.970) NasDem (1.628) Democratic (1.584) PKB (1.553) PAN (1.302) PKS (1.229) PPP (954) Hanura (746) Perindo (379) PBB (214) PKPI (155) Berkarya (131) PSI (60) Garuda (33) Aceh's local parties (187); PA (120); PNA (46); PDA (17); SIRA (4)

Elections
- DPRD I voting system: Open list proportional representation
- DPRD II voting system: Open list proportional representation
- Last DPRD I election: 14 February 2024
- Last DPRD II election: 14 February 2024
- Next DPRD I election: 2031
- Next DPRD II election: 2031

In Indonesia, a Regional House of Representatives (Indonesian: Dewan Perwakilan Rakyat Daerah, Indonesian pronunciation: [ˌdewan pərwaˌkilan ˈraʔjat da'erah], lit. 'Regional People's Representative Council', abbr. DPRD, Indonesian: [de'peɛrde]) is the unicameral legislative body of an Indonesian national subdivision, at either the provincial (DPRD I) or at the regency/city (DPRD II) level. They are based on the amended Constitution of Indonesia, which mandated the creation of such bodies for local governance. The legislatures are present in all Indonesian provinces, and all second-level subdivisions except for the constituent municipalities of Jakarta.

== Names ==
In Aceh, the provincial legislature is named the Aceh House of Representatives (Indonesian: Dewan Perwakilan Rakyat Aceh, DPRA), while municipal legislatures are referred to as either City House of Representatives or Regency House of Representatives (Indonesian: Dewan Perwakilan Rakyat Kota, Indonesian: Dewan Perwakilan Rakyat Kabupaten, DPRK(last letter of city/regency)). The different names were set by Law 11 of 2006 on Acehnese government. Provinces in Western New Guinea similarly do not include the word Daerah (Regional) in their provincial legislatures and prefer to add the last letter of the province/city/regency for the abbreviation, as regulated by Law 21 of 2001 on Papuan Special Autonomy.

== History ==
During the Dutch colonial period, the colonial government in Indonesia established a number of village and city councils with elected members. The original Constitution of Indonesia, written in 1945, did not include specific provisions for DPRD, deferring local government to later laws. Shortly after the proclamation of Indonesian independence in August 1945, ad-hoc regional committees would be established at the instigation of the national Central Indonesian National Committee. In 1948, the government enacted the Law No. 22 of 1948, which mandated the form of local governments which included Regional Houses of Representatives with elected members and had the authority to elect members of a Regional Leadership Council, which included the regional leader. Government regulations No. 36 and 39 in 1950 initially arranged the election process for DPRD, until superseded by the Law No. 19 of 1956.

Local legislatures were established in the early 1950s, although they were replaced by transitional DPRD in 1956. Elections were held in 1957 and 1958 to elect members of DPRD at provincial and municipal levels. The next election for DPRD members would be under Suharto in 1971, simultaneous with legislative elections for the national House of Representatives (DPR). DPRDs maintained their legal authority to select regional leaders (i.e. governors, mayors, and regents) during the New Order period. However, due to the majority of DPRD members being members of the ruling party Golkar, DPRD were generally rubber stamp legislatures which wielded little actual power.

Explicit mention of DPRD in the constitution (Art. 18, clause 3) would be added by amendment in the Reformasi period. Post-Suharto laws would provide more power to DPRD, although the Law No. 32 of 2004 would remove DPRD authority to elect regional leaders, and instead established direct elections for governors, regents and mayors.

== Powers ==
DPRD powers are classified under Law No. 17 of 2014 as legislative, budgeting, and supervisory powers, which includes creating regional laws, approving budgets proposed by the regional heads (governors/mayors/regents), and monitoring the spending of funds. Additionally, DPRD could propose the removal of a regional head to the Ministry of Home Affairs, and may declare impeachment of a regional head. However, DPRD cannot remove regional heads from their positions, which remained the authority of the Supreme Court of Indonesia.

== Membership and elections ==
All DPRD members must be elected as members of political parties.

From the 1971 election until 2024, elections for DPRD were held simultaneously with those for the national legislature, the DPR. However, following a Constitutional Court decision in 2025, starting from the 2029 election, DPRD elections will be held separately from the national legislative elections. The national and local elections are to have a gap of between 2 and 2.5 years, with the next DPRD elections to be held along with local executive elections in 2031.

Members are elected for five-year terms without term limits.. An exception applies for the elected members of the 2024-2029 period, whose term is extended until 2031 due to the new requirement of a 2-2.5 year gap between national elections and local elections.

Since the 2004 election, DPRD members have been elected through an open list proportional representation system, using the Sainte-Laguë method to allocate seats since the 2019 election.

The national parliamentary threshold, used in elections to the DPR, does not apply to DPRD elections. Although the 2014 election initially proposed a 3.5 percent threshold for both DPR and DPRD, the Constitutional Court of Indonesia struck down the threshold for DPRDs in 2013, limiting it to DPR elections only.

The Indonesian electoral law of 2017 sets the number of DPRD seats according to the population of each region, as defined in the ranges below:

Provincial / DPRD I^{:Art. 188}		Regency/City / DPRD II^{:Art. 191}	
Population	DPRD Seats	Population	DPRD Seats
<1 million	35	<100 thousand	20
1-3 million	45	100-200 thousand	25
3-5 million	55	200-300 thousand	30
5-7 million	65	300-400 thousand	35
7-9 million	75	400-500 thousand	40
9-11 million	85	500 thousand-1 million	45
11-20 million	100	1-3 million	50
>20 million	120	>3 million	55

The seats are also distributed in electoral districts with 3-12 members each. The law requires these electoral districts to follow the administrative borders of regencies/cities (provincial) or districts (regency/city) if possible, though partition of a subdivision into multiple districts is allowed if not possible otherwise.^{:Art. 187,189,192} In total, the 2017 law mandated 2,372 seats in DPRD I and 17,510 in DPRD II for the 2024 election. Exceptions to the above are DPRD I of Aceh and Jakarta, which has 81 and 106 seats allocated, respectively. Furthermore, DPRD in Western New Guinea allocates additional reserved seats for native Papuans numbering 25 percent of elected members. Members on the reserved seats are appointed by a council of government officials, academics, and tribal leaders. These native Papuan members are not allowed to be members of political parties and must have not participated in the previous legislative election.

Sitting DPRD members are required to resign their positions in order to run for a legislative position from a different party from their prior affiliation or any executive position, although members-elect who had not been sworn in are not required to do so. If a sitting member resigned, died, or is otherwise removed, and has more than six months left in the term, a replacement is appointed to complete the term. The replacement is selected from the same political party, specifically, the legislative candidate who ran in the same electoral district and received the next highest vote count but did not qualify.

== Structure ==
The structure of DPRDs is defined by the Law 17 of 2014. All DPRD has a speaker and at least two deputy speakers, with three deputy speakers for legislatures numbering 45-84 and four deputy speakers for legislatures with 85 or more members.^{:Art 327, 376} The speaker is selected from DPRD members from the political party with the most seats in the DPRD, or the party with more popular votes in the event of a tie. Deputy speakers are similarly selected from parties with the second-most, third-most, fourth-most, or fifth-most members/popular votes.^{:Art 327, 376}

DPRD members are divided into commissions which focus on specific issues. The number of commissions in a DPRD depends on its membership count, with three commissions for DPRD with 35 members or less, four for DPRD with 55 members or less, and five for DPRD with more than 55 members.^{:Art 329, 378} All members are also part of a parliamentary group (fraksi), which are required to have at least as many members as the corresponding DPRD has commissions. A fraksi may comprise multiple political parties, but all legislators of the same political party must remain within the same fraksi.^{:Art 329, 378}

== Gallery ==
All DPRD composition

Composition of the DPRD I (provincial) as a results of the 2024 Indonesian legislative election

Composition of the DPRD I (provincial) as a results of the 2019 Indonesian legislative election

Composition of the DPRD II (regency/city) as a results of the 2019 Indonesian legislative election
