= Aceh Abode Party =

Aceh Abode Party Partai Darul Aceh
- Abbreviation: PDA
- Chairman: Muhibbussabri A. Wahab
- Secretary-General: Abu Syahminan Zakaria
- Founded: 2007
- Headquarters: Banda Aceh
- Ideology: Islamism; Aceh regionalism
- Ballot number: 20
- DPRD I seats: 1 / 81
- DPRD II seats: 7 / 665

Website
- http://dpw-pda.blogspot.co.id

The Aceh Abode Party (Indonesian: Partai Darul Aceh, PDA), formerly the Aceh Sovereignty Party (Indonesian: Partai Daulat Aceh) and Aceh Peace Party (Indonesian: Partai Damai Aceh), is a regional political party in Indonesia originally established to accommodate religious figures not associated with the Free Aceh Movement (GAM). It contested the 2009 elections in the province of Aceh under its original name. Its electoral target was 20% or 3 million votes, but it only won 39,706 votes (1.85% of the Aceh vote). Under the current party name, it took part in the 2014 elections, and garnered 72,721 votes, a 3% share of the Aceh vote. This was enough for it to be awarded one seat in the 81-member Aceh People's Representative Council.

In 2016, it changed its name to Aceh Regional Party. The party's representation in the provincial council increased to 3 seats following the 2019 election. It changed its name once more in 2021 into the Aceh Abode Party, the party's fourth name.

== General Chairman ==
Portrait	General Chairman	Period
	Nurkalis	2008–2012
	Teungku Muhibbussabri A. Wahab	2012–2016
	Jamaluddin Thaib	2016–2021
	Teungku Muhibbussabri A. Wahab	2021–2026

== Election performance ==
Election	Total seats	Valid Votes		Results	Order	Description
Election	Total seats	Total	%	Results	Order	Description
2009	1 / 69	39,706	1.85	New party	10	As the Aceh Sovereignty Party.
2014	1 / 81	▲72,721		0 seats	10	As the Aceh Peace Party.
2019	3 / 81	▲87,743	3,30	▲2 seats	11	As the Aceh Regional Party.
2024	1 / 81	▼22,662	0.73	▼2 seats	14	As the Darul Aceh Party.

== Gallery ==
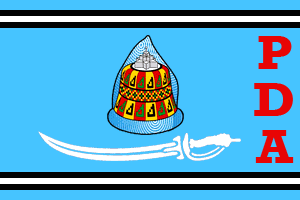
Aceh Peace Party Logo (2012–2016)

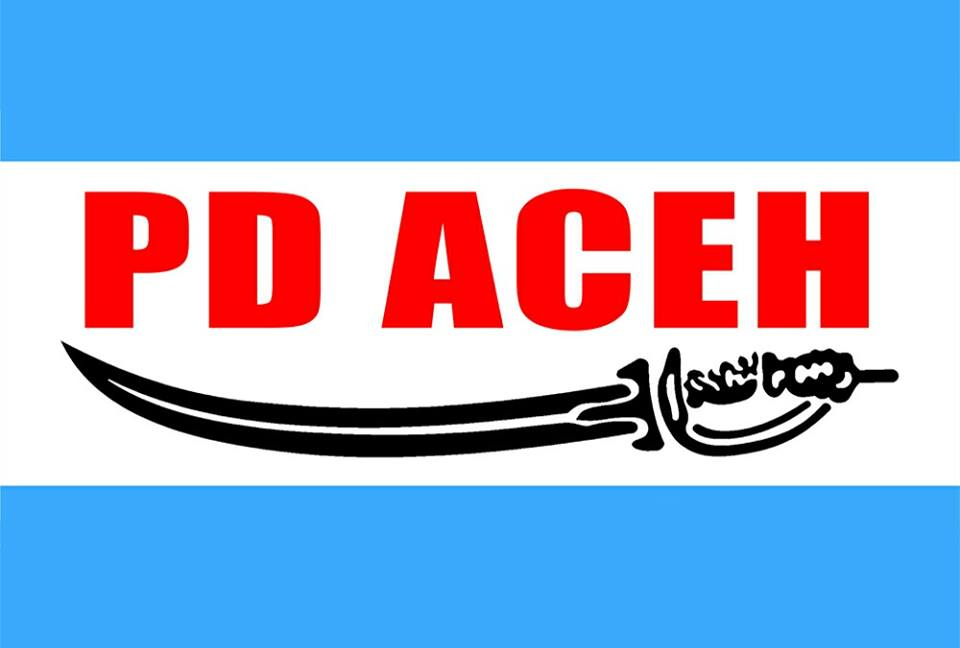
Aceh Regional Party Logo (2016–2021)
