= Aceh Just and Prosperous Party =

Regional political party in Indonesia

Aceh Just and Prosperous Party فرتي عادل سجهترا أتجيه Partai Adil Sejahtera Aceh
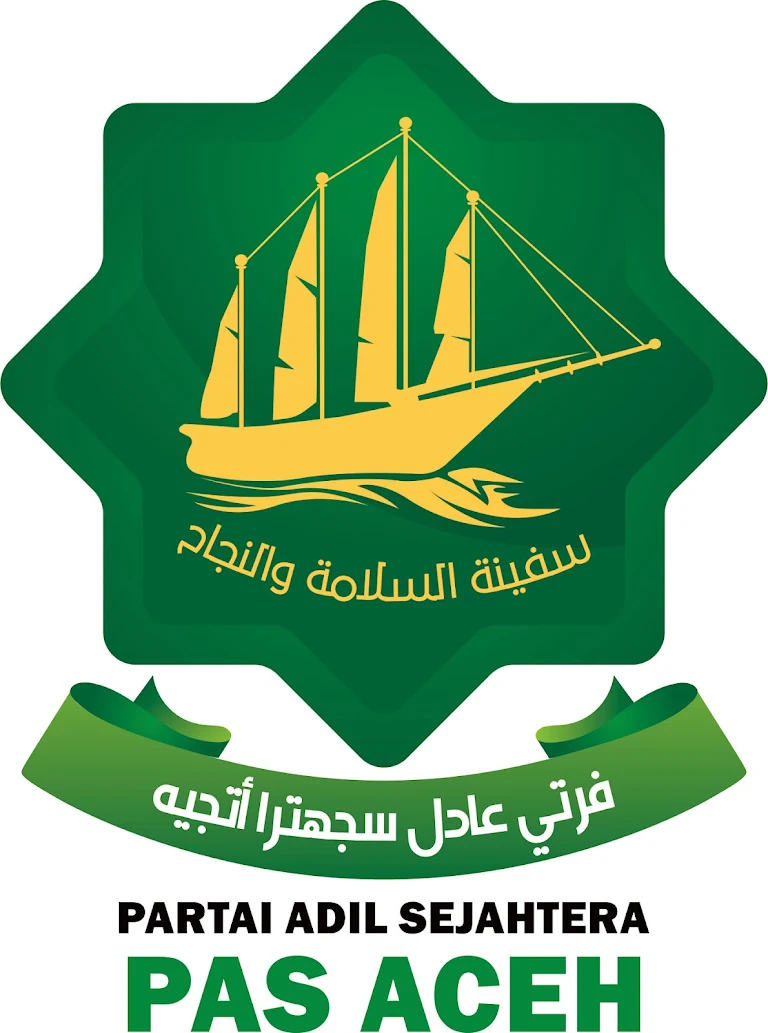
- Abbreviation: PAS Aceh
- Chairman: Tu Bulqaini Tanjongan
- Secretary-General: Muhammad Zikri
- Founded: 10 November 2021 (founded); 22 February 2023 (declared)
- Headquarters: Banda Aceh, Aceh
- Ideology: Islamism
- Slogan: Harapan Baru Aceh (Aceh's New Hope)
- Ballot number: 22
- DPRD I: 4 / 81
- DPRD II: 16 / 665

Website
- pas-aceh.org

The Aceh Just and Prosperous Party (Indonesian: Partai Adil Sejahtera Aceh, Jawi script: فرتي عادل سجهترا أتجيه), often known by its abbreviation PAS Aceh, is an Islamist regional political party in Indonesia that was established in 2021.

== History ==
PAS Aceh was founded based on one of the recommendations from the Aceh clerics' Ijma' in the Aceh Cleric Gathering (SUA) on 10 November 2021 in Banda Aceh. PAS held its great gathering on 22 February 2023, at which Abuya Mawardi Waly Abuya Mawardi Waly officially declared its establishment. Furthermore, several clerics such as Tgk.H. Hasanul Basri (Abu Mudi), Tgk. H. Muhammad Yusuf A. Wahab (Tu Sop), Tgk M. Yusuf Nasir Jeunib), Abu Ishak Langkawe, Tgk. H. Muhammad Amin Daud Cot Trueng, Tgk. H. Abdullah Tanjong Bungong, Tgk. H. Abu Bakar Buni, Abati Dahlan Jungka Gajah, Abati Lhok Mon Puteh and Habib Dr. Zainal Abidin Bilfaqih, attended the gathering, .

This Dayah-based party is one of the political parties participating in the 2024 Indonesian general election with a ballot number 22. Four party candidates were elected to the 81-member Aceh House of Representatives and 16 to municipal legislatures in the legislative election. Party member Sibral Malasyi was also elected regent of Pidie Jaya in the 2024 local election.

== General Chairman ==
No.	Chairman	Period
1	Tu Bulqaini Tanjongan	2021–2026

== Election performance ==
Election	Total seats	Valid Votes		Results	Order	Description
Election	Total seats	Total	%	Results	Order	Description
2024	4 / 81	147,772	4.78	New party	10	
