= Endorsements in the 2019 Indonesian presidential election =

This page is a non-exhaustive list of individuals and organisations who endorsed individual candidates for the 2019 Indonesian presidential election. Politicians are noted with their party origin or political affiliation should they come from parties not part of the candidate's coalition. Celebrities are noted with their party origin should they have one. Years of office are accurate during the election day (17 April 2019).

== Endorsements for Joko Widodo ==
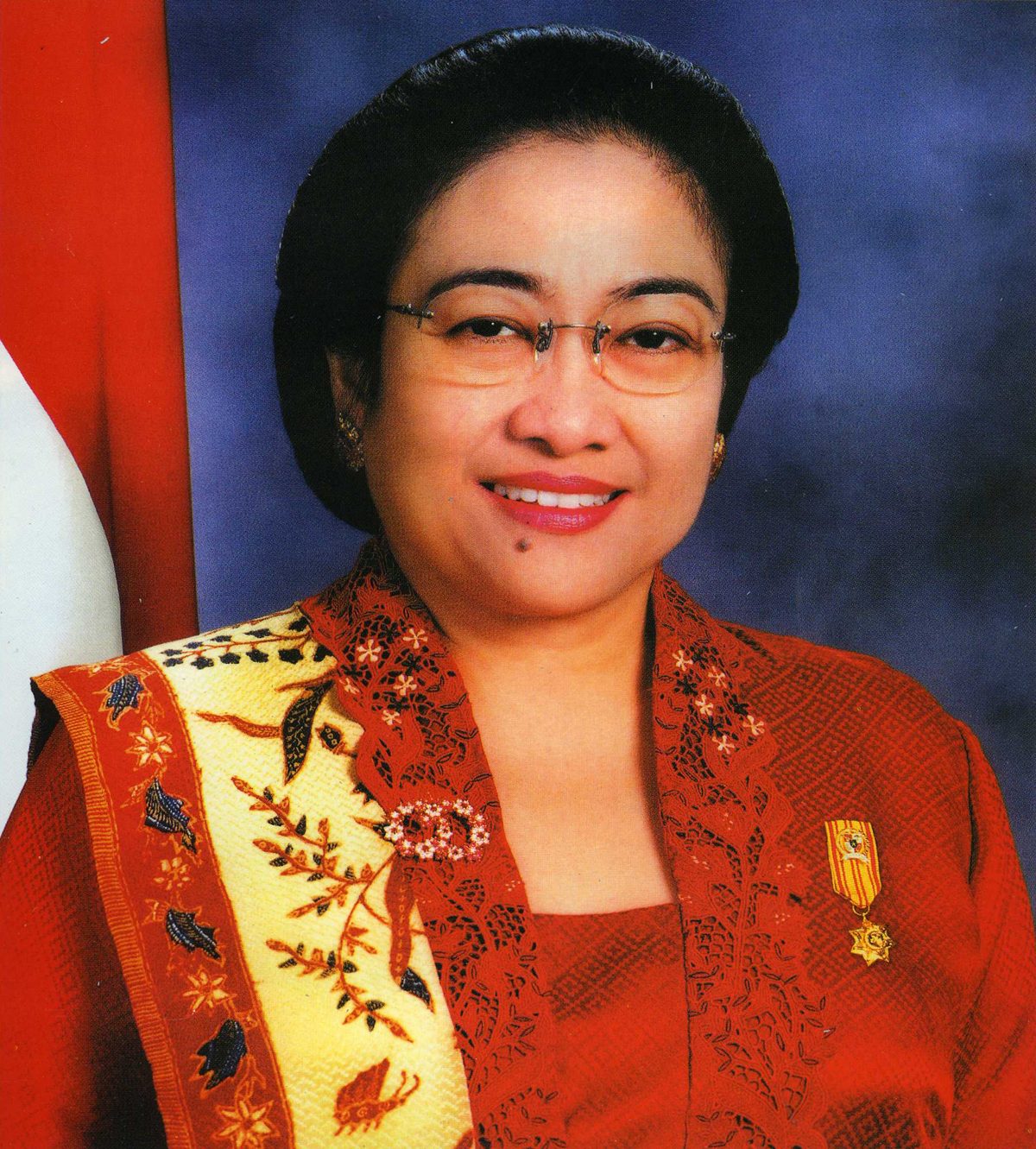
Megawati Sukarnoputri

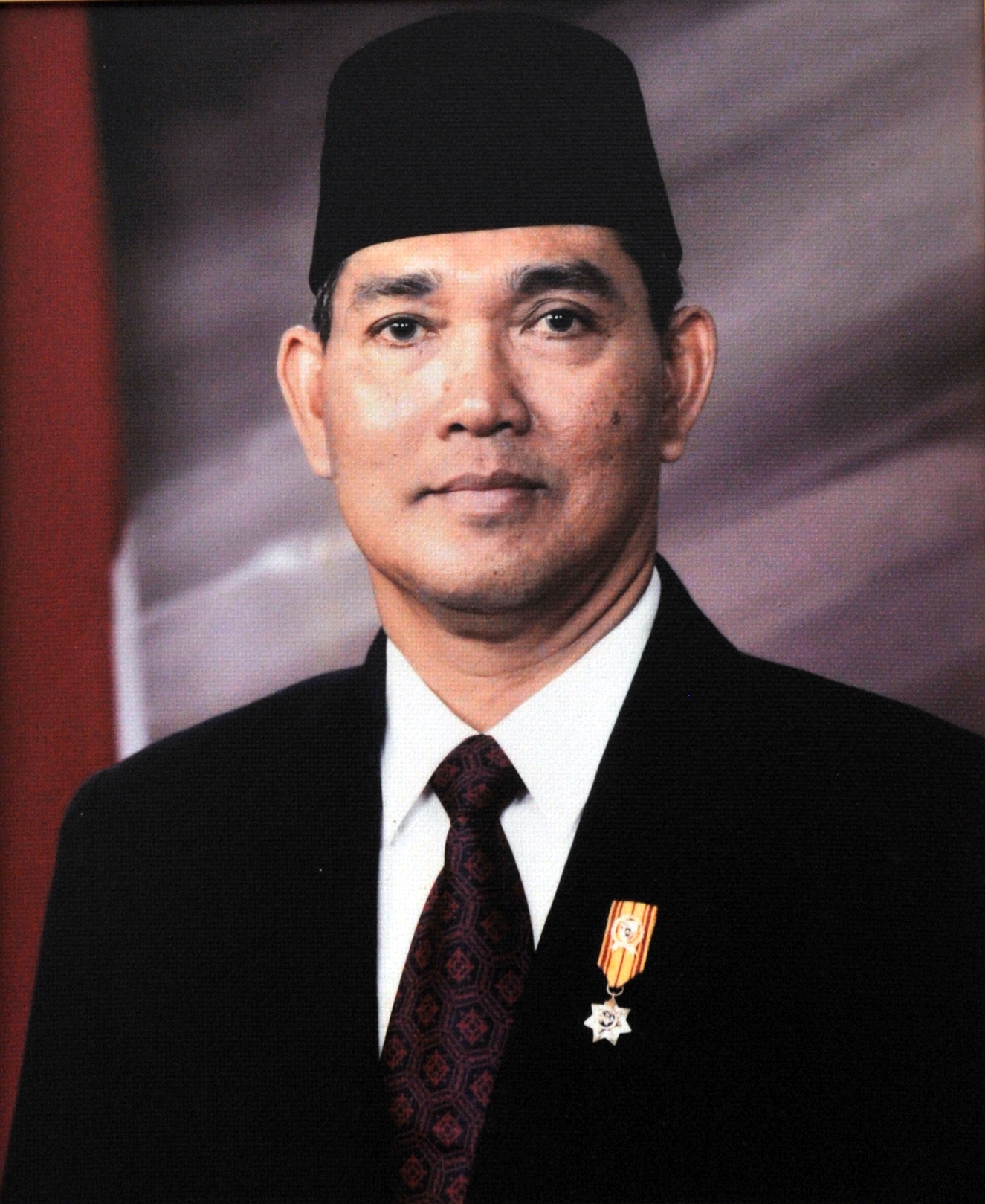
Try Sutrisno

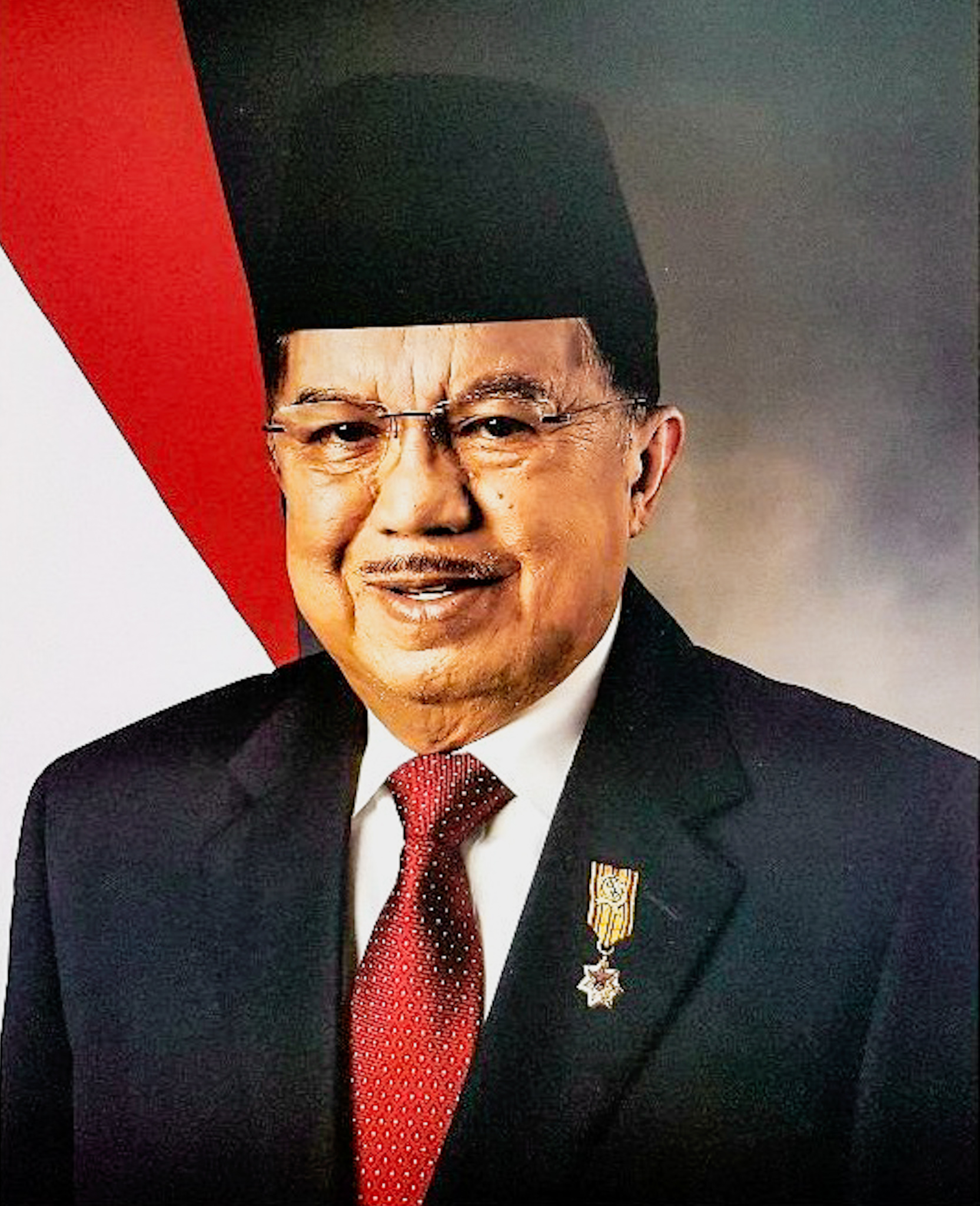
Jusuf Kalla

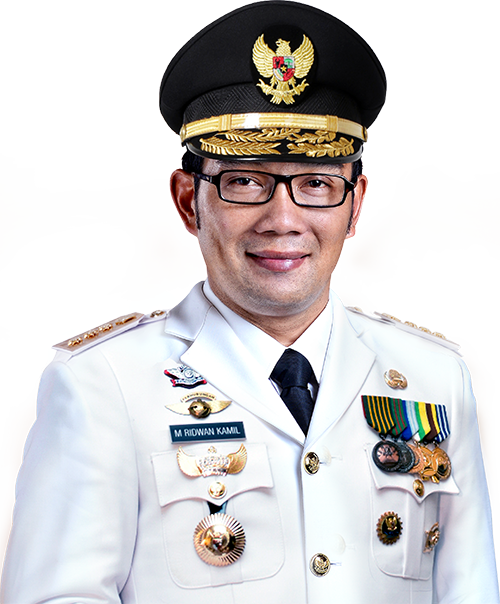
Ridwan Kamil

Djarot Saiful Hidayat

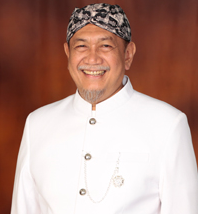
Deddy Mizwar

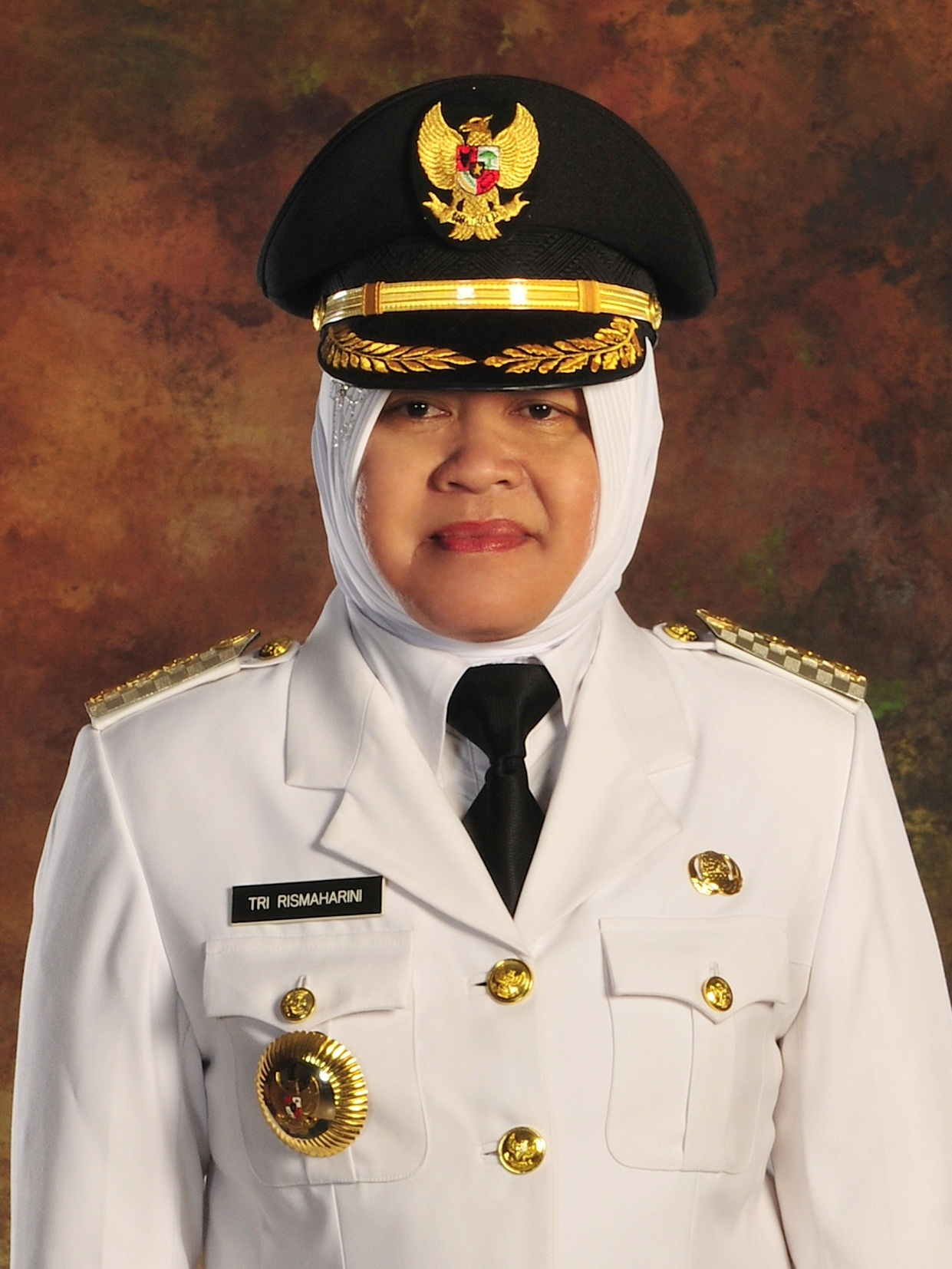
Tri Rismaharini

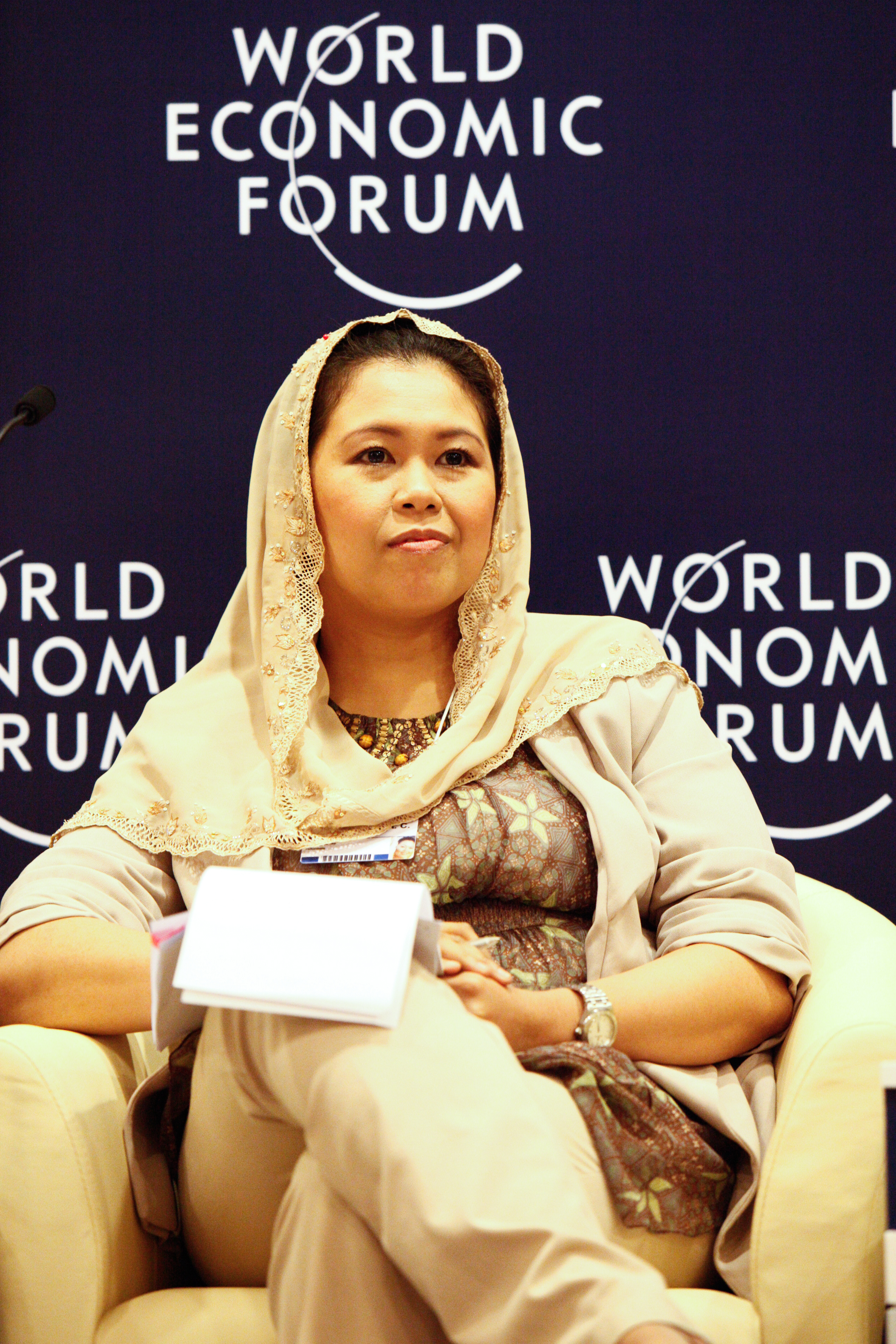
Yenny Wahid

=== Central government ===
==== President and vice presidents ====
- Megawati Sukarnoputri, 5th President of Indonesia (2001–04), 8th Vice President of Indonesia (1999–2001), daughter of 1st President Sukarno
- Gen. (ret.) Try Sutrisno, 6th Vice President of Indonesia (1993–98), former Commander of the Indonesian National Armed Forces (1988–93), former Chief of Staff of the Indonesian Army (1986–88)
- Jusuf Kalla, 10th and 12th Vice President of Indonesia (2004–09, 2014–present), former Coordinating Minister for People's Welfare (2001–04), former Minister of Industry and Trade (1999–2000)

==== Cabinet-level officers ====
- Gen (ret.) Wiranto, Coordinating Minister for Political, Legal, and Security Affairs (2016–present, 1999–2000 as Coordinating Minister for Political and Security Affairs), former Minister of Defence dan Security (1998–99), former Commander of the Indonesian National Armed Forces (1998–99), former Chief of Staff of the Indonesian Army (1997–98)
- Puan Maharani, Coordinating Minister for Human Development and Cultural Affairs (2014–present), daughter of 5th President Megawati Sukarnoputri
- Lukman Hakim Saifuddin, Minister of Religious Affairs (2014, 2014–present), former Deputy Speaker of the MPR (2009–14)
- Tjahjo Kumolo, Minister of Home Affairs (2014–present)
- Gen. (ret.) Ryamizard Ryacudu, Minister of Defence (2014–present), former Chief of Staff of the Indonesian Army (2002–05)
- Yasonna Laoly, Minister of Law and Human Rights (2014–present)
- Basuki Hadimuljono, Minister of Public Works and People's Housing (2014–present)
- Muhammad Hanif Dhakiri, Minister of Manpower (2014–present)
- Siti Nurbaya Bakar, Minister of Environment and Forestry (2014–present)
- Anak Agung Gede Ngurah Puspayoga, Minister of Cooperatives and Small and Medium Enterprises (2014–present), former Vice Governor of Bali (2008–13)
- Imam Nahrawi, Minister of Youth and Sport (2014–present)
- Pramono Anung, Cabinet Secretary of Indonesia (2015–present), former Deputy Speaker of the DPR (2009–14)
- Gen. (Hons.) (ret.) Luhut Binsar Pandjaitan, Coordinating Minister for Maritime Affairs (2016–present), former Coordinating Minister for Political, Legal, and Security Affairs (2015–16), former head of the Presidential Staff Office (2014–15), former Minister of Industry and Trade (2000–01)
- Sri Mulyani, Minister of Finance (2016–present, 2005–10), former Managing Director of World Bank Group (2010–16), former Coordinating Minister for Economic Affairs (2008–09, acting), former State Minister of National Development Planning (2004–05)
- Airlangga Hartarto, Minister of Industry (2016–present)
- Budi Karya Sumadi, Ministry of Transport (2016–present)
- Eko Putro Sandjojo, Minister of Village, Underdeveloped Regions Development, and Transmigration (2016–present)
- Pol. Com. Gen. (ret.) Syafruddin, Minister of State Apparatus Utilization and Bureaucratic Reform (2018–present), former Deputy Chief of the Indonesian National Police (2016–18)
- Agus Gumiwang Kartasasmita, Minister of Social Affairs (2018–present), former DPR member (2009–18)
- Gen. (ret.) Moeldoko, head of the Presidential Staff Office (2018–present), former Commander of the Indonesian National Armed Forces (2013–15), former Chief of Staff of the Indonesian Army (2013)
- Pol. Maj. Gen. (ret.) Sidarto Danusubroto, member of Presidential Advisory Board of Indonesia (2015–present), former Speaker of the MPR (2013–14)
- Gen. (ret.) Subagyo Hadi Siswoyo, member of Presidential Advisory Board of Indonesia (2015–present), former Chief of Staff of the Indonesian Army (1998–99)
- Suharso Monoarfa, member of Presidential Advisory Board of Indonesia (2015–present), former State Minister of People's Housing (2009–11)
- Gen. (Hons.) (ret.) Agum Gumelar, member of Presidential Advisory Board of Indonesia (2018–present), former Minister of Transportation (1999–2001, 2001–04), former Coordinating Minister for Political, Social, and Security Affairs (2001)
- Alwi Shihab, Presidential Special Envoy for Middle East and the Organisation of Islamic Cooperation (2015–present), former Coordinating Minister for People's Welfare (2004–05), former Minister of Foreign Affairs (1999–2001)
- Marwan Jafar, former Minister of Village, Underdeveloped Regions Development, and Transmigration (2014–16)
- Andi Widjajanto, former Cabinet Secretary of Indonesia (2014–15)
- Muhammad Lutfi, former Minister of Trade (2014)
- Agung Laksono, former Coordinating Minister for People's Welfare (2009–14), former Speaker of the DPR (2004–09), former State Minister of Youth and Sport (1998–99, a.i. 2012–13)
- Air Mshl (ret.) Ginandjar Kartasasmita, former member of Presidential Advisory Board of Indonesia (2010–14), former Speaker of the DPD (2004–09), former Coordinating Minister for Economic, Financial, and Industrial Affairs (1998–99), former State Minister of National Development Planning (1993–98), former Minister of Mining and Energy (1988–93)
- Vice Adm. (ret.) Freddy Numberi, former Minister of Transportation (2009–11), former Minister of Marine Affairs and Fisheries (2004–09), former State Minister of State Apparatus Utilization (1999–2000)
- Erman Soeparno, former Minister of Manpower and Transmigration (2005–09)
- Muhammad Lukman Edy, former State Minister of Underdeveloped Regions Development (2007–09)
- Yusril Ihza Mahendra, former Minister of State Secretary (2004–07), former Minister of Justice and Human Rights (2001–04, 1999–2001 as Minister of Law and Legislation)
- Gen. (Hons.) (ret.) A. M. Hendropriyono, former head of the State Intelligence Agency (2001–04), former Minister of Transmigration and Forest Squatter Settlements (1998–99)
- Akbar Tanjung, former Speaker of the DPR (1999–2004), former Minister of State Secretary (1998–99), former State Minister of People's Housing dan Settlements (1993–98), former State Minister of Youth and Sport (1988–93)
- Siswono Yudo Husodo, former Minister of Transmigration and Forest Squatter Settlements (1993–98), former State Minister of People's Housing (1988–93)
- Hayono Isman, former State Minister of Youth and Sport (1993–98)

==== Members of central parliamentary houses ====
- Oesman Sapta Odang, Deputy Speaker of the MPR (2002–04, 2014–present), Speaker of the DPD (2017–present)
- Ahmad Basarah, Deputy Speaker of the MPR (2018–present), DPR member (2004–present)
- Muhaimin Iskandar, Deputy Speaker of the MPR (2018–present), former Minister of Manpower and Transmigration (2009–14), former Deputy Speaker of the DPR (2004–09)
- Bambang Soesatyo, Speaker of the DPR (2018–present)
- Utut Adianto, Deputy Speaker of the DPR (2018–present)
- Alamuddin Dimyati Rois, DPR member (2009–present)
- Jhoni Allen Marbun, DPR member (2009–2014, 2018–present) (Demokrat)
- Rieke Diah Pitaloka, DPR member (2009–present), actress
- Muhammad Romahurmuziy, DPR member (2011–present)
- I Gede Pasek Suardika, DPD member (2014–present), former DPR member (2009–14)
- Aksa Mahmud, former Deputy Speaker of the MPR (2004–09), former DPD member (2004–09), founder of Bosowa Corporation
- Venna Melinda, former DPR member (2009–2018), Puteri Indonesia 1994 winner
- Ida Fauziyah, former DPR member (1999–2018)
- Ruhut Sitompul, former DPR member (2009–17), lawyer, actor
- Nurul Arifin, former DPR member (2004–14), former actress
- Effendy Choirie, former DPR member (1999–2013)
- Abdillah Toha, former DPR member (2004–09)
- Maimun Zubair, former MPR member (1987–99), Muslim cleric
- Surya Paloh, former DPR/MPR member (1977–87), owner of Media Group, general chair of NasDem Party

==== Independent agencies and commissions officers ====
- Antasari Azhar, former chair of the Corruption Eradication Commission (2007–09) (Independent)
- Juri Ardiantoro, former chair of the General Elections Commission (2016–17) (Independent)

=== Provincial government ===
==== Governors and Vice Governors ====
- Syamsuar, Governor of Riau (2019–present), Regent of Siak (2011–19) (PAN)
- Nurdin Basirun, Governor of Riau Islands (2016–present), former Vice Governor of Riau Islands (2016)
- Fachrori Umar, Governor of Jambi (2019–present, Acting Governor 2018–19), former Vice Governor of Jambi (2010–15, 2016–18)
- Herman Deru, Governor of South Sumatra (2018–present)
- Wahidin Halim, Governor of Banten (2017–present), former DPR member (2014–17), former Mayor of Tangerang (2003–13) (Demokrat)
- Ridwan Kamil, Governor of West Java (2018–present), former Mayor of Bandung (2013–18) (Independent)
- Ganjar Pranowo, Governor of Central Java (2013–18, 2018–present)
- Khofifah Indar Parawansa, Governor of East Java (2019–present), former Minister of Social Affairs (2014–18), former State Minister of Female Empowerment (1999–2001), former Deputy Speaker of the DPR (1999)
- Sutarmidji, Governor of West Kalimantan (2018–present)
- Sugianto Sabran, Governor of Central Kalimantan (2016–present)
- Irianto Lambrie, Governor of North Kalimantan (2016–present, Acting Governor 2013–15)
- Sahbirin Noor, Governor of South Kalimantan (2016–present)
- I Wayan Koster, Governor of Bali (2018–present)
- Zulkieflimansyah, Governor of West Nusa Tenggara (2018–present) (PKS)
- Viktor Laiskodat, Governor of East Nusa Tenggara (2018–present)
- Ali Baal Masdar, Governor of West Sulawesi (2017–present)(Gerindra)
- Nurdin Abdullah, Governor of South Sulawesi (2018–present), former Regent of Bantaeng (2008–18)
- Ali Mazi, Governor of Southeast Sulawesi (2003–08, 2018–present)
- Olly Dondokambey, Governor of North Sulawesi (2016–present)
- Abdul Ghani Kasuba, Governor of North Maluku (2014–present), former Vice Governor of North Maluku (2008–13) (PKS)
- Dominggus Mandacan, Governor of West Papua (2017–present)
- Lukas Enembe, Governor of Papua (2013–18, 2018–present) (Demokrat)
- Pol. Insp. Gen. (ret.) Murad Ismail, Governor-elect of Maluku (Independent)
- Brig. Gen. (ret.) Edy Nasution, Vice Governor of Riau (2019–present)
- Mawardi Yahya, Vice Governor of South Sumatra (2018–present)
- Abdul Fatah, Vice Governor of Bangka Belitung Islands (2017–present)
- Uu Ruzhanul Ulum, Vice Governor of West Java (2018–present), former Regent of Tasikmalaya (2011–18)
- Taj Yasin, Vice Governor of Central Java (2018–present)
- Emil Dardak, Vice Governor of East Java (2019–present), former Regent of Trenggalek (2016–19) (Demokrat)
- Tjokorda Oka Artha Ardana Sukawati, Vice Governor of Bali (2018–present), former Regent of Gianyar (2008–13)
- Sitti Rohmi Djalilah, Vice Governor of West Nusa Tenggara (2018–present) (Independent, formerly Demokrat)
- Enny Anggraeny Anwar, Vice Governor of West Sulawesi (2017–present)
- Irwandi Yusuf, Governor of Aceh (2007–12, 2017–2018;` currently inactive) (PNA)
- Tengku Erry Nuradi, former Governor of North Sumatra (2016–18), former Vice Governor of North Sumatra (2013–16)
- Rano Karno, former Governor of Banten (2015–17, Acting Governor 2014–15), former Vice Governor of Banten (2012–14), actor
- Djarot Saiful Hidayat, former Governor of Jakarta (2017), former Vice Governor of Jakarta (2014–17), former Mayor of Blitar (2000–10)
- Lt. Gen. (ret.) Solihin Gautama Purwanegara, former Governor of West Java (1970–74) (Independent)
- Danny Setiawan, former Governor of West Java (2003–08)
- Cornelis, former Governor of West Kalimantan (2008–18)
- Awang Faroek Ishak, former Governor of East Kalimantan (2008–18)
- Rudy Ariffin, former Governor of South Kalimantan (2005–15)
- Syahrul Yasin Limpo, former Governor of South Sulawesi (2008–18), former Vice Governor of South Sulawesi (2003–08)
- Muhammad Zainul Majdi, former Governor of West Nusa Tenggara (2008–18), former DPR member (2004–08), Muslim cleric
- Anwar Adnan Saleh, former Governor of West Sulawesi (2006–16)
- Deddy Mizwar, former Vice Governor of West Java (2013–18), actor (Demokrat)
- Irene Manibuy, former Vice Governor of West Papua (2015–17)

==== Members of provincial parliament ====
- Prasetyo Edi Marsudi, Speaker of the Jakarta Parliament (2014–present)
- Wanda Hamidah, former Jakarta Parliament member (2009–14), actress

=== Municipal government ===
- Maulan Aklil, Mayor of Pangkalpinang (2018–present)
- Airin Rachmi Diany, Mayor of South Tangerang (2011–present)
- Bima Arya Sugiarto, Mayor-elect of Bogor, Mayor of Bogor (2014–19)
- Rahmat Effendi, Mayor of Bekasi (2012–18, 2018–present, Acting Mayor 2011–12), former Vice Mayor of Bekasi (2008–12)
- Hendrar Prihadi, Mayor of Semarang (2013–present)
- F.X. Hadi Rudyatmo, Mayor of Surakarta (2012–15, 2016–present), former Vice Mayor of Surakarta (2005–12)
- Tri Rismaharini, Mayor of Surabaya (2010–15, 2016–present)
- Mohammad Ramdhan Pomanto, Mayor of Makassar (2014–present)
- Karolin Margret Natasa, Regent of Landak (2017–present)
- Ade Yasin, Regent of Bogor (2018–present)
- Anne Ratna Mustika, Regent of Purwakarta (2018–present)
- Aa Umbara Sutisna, Regent of West Bandung (2018–present)
- Sambari Halim Radianto, Regent of Gresik (2010–15, 2016–present)
- Vonnie Anneke Panambunan, Regent of North Minahasa (2005–08, 2016–present)
- Bambang Dwi Hartono, former Mayor of Surabaya (2002–05, 2005–10), former Vice Mayor of Surabaya (2000–02, 2010–13)
- Mulyadi Jayabaya, former Regent of Lebak (2003–13)
- Nurhayanti, former Regent of Bogor (2015–18)
- Dedi Mulyadi, former Regent of Purwakarta (2008–18), former Vice Regent of Purwakarta (2003–08)

=== Notable political figures ===
- Faisal Basri, economist, 2012 Jakarta gubernatorial candidate (Independent)
- Grace Natalie, general chairwoman of the Indonesian Solidarity Party, former news anchor
- Hendra Bambang Wisanggeni, 18th Sultan of Banten (Independent)
- La Nyalla Mattalitti, former general chairman of PSSI (Independent)
- Sukmawati Sukarnoputri, daughter of 1st President Sukarno (Independent)
- Yenny Wahid, daughter of 4th President Abdurrahman Wahid, former director of Wahid Institute (Independent)

=== Retired military and police personnel ===
==== Retired Indonesian Army personnel ====
- Gen. Fachrul Razi, former Deputy Commander of the Indonesian National Armed Forces (1999–2000)
- Lt. Gen. Sumardi, former head Doctrine, Education and Training Development Command of the Indonesian National Armed Forces (2016–17)
- Lt. Gen. Suaidi Marasabessy, former Indonesian National Armed Forces general chief of staff (1999–2000)
- Lt. Gen. Lodewijk Freidrich Paulus, former General Commander of the Kopassus (2009–11)
- Maj. Gen. Muchdi Purwopranjono, former General Commander of the Kopassus (1998) (Berkarya)

==== Retired Indonesian Navy personnel ====
- Adm. Arief Koeshariadi, former Chief of Staff of the Indonesian Navy (1996–98)
- Adm. Bernard Kent Sondakh, former Chief of Staff of the Indonesian Navy (2002–05)
- Adm. Marsetio, former Chief of Staff of the Indonesian Navy (2012–14)

==== Retired Indonesian Air Force personnel ====
- Air Chf Mshl Agus Supriatna, former Chief of Staff of the Indonesian Air Force (2015–17)

==== Retired Indonesian National Police personnel ====
- Pol. Gen. Roesmanhadi, former Chief of the Indonesian National Police (1998–2000)
- Pol. Gen. Suroyo Bimantoro, former Chief of the Indonesian National Police (2000–01)
- Pol. Gen. Da'i Bachtiar, former Chief of the Indonesian National Police (2001–05)

=== Businesspeople ===
- Erick Thohir, owner of Mahaka Group
- Hary Tanoesoedibjo, owner of MNC Group, general chair of Perindo Party
- Rosan Roeslani, chair of Indonesian Chamber of Commerce and Industry

=== Celebrities ===
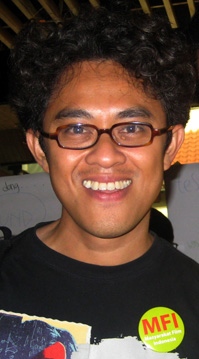
Riri Riza

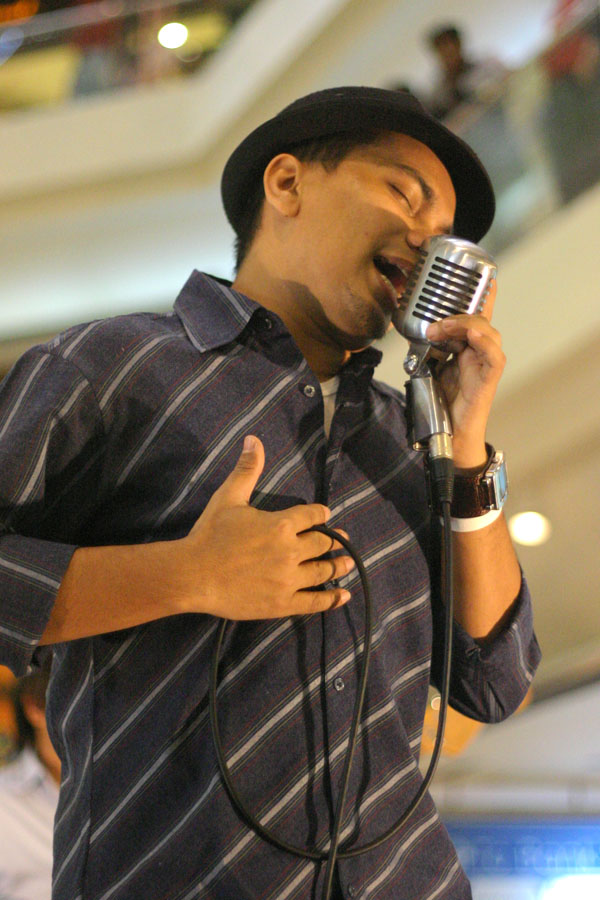
Tompi

- Addie MS, music conductor, producer, and composer
- Afgansyah Reza, singer
- Andien, singer
- Andre Taulany, presenter and singer
- Andy /rif, musician
- Angel Karamoy, actress (PDI-P)
- Anji, musician
- Arie Kriting, comedian and actor
- Ashanty, singer
- Bob Tutupoly, singer
- Brisia Jodie Maurinne, singer
- Cak Lontong, comedian
- Candil, singer
- Cathy Sharon, actress
- Chacha Frederica, actress
- Chicha Koeswoyo, singer (PDI-P)
- Christine Hakim, actress
- Cut Mini Theo, actress
- Darwis Triadi, professional photographer
- Desta, musician and actor
- Dira Sugandi, singer
- Elma Theana, actress (Nasdem)
- Ernest Prakasa, comedian and actor
- Muhammad Farhan, quiz presenter (Nasdem)
- Gading Marten, actor
- Ge Pamungkas, comedian and actor
- Giring Ganesha, musician (PSI)
- Glenn Fredly, musician
- Haddad Alwi, Islamic spiritual singer
- Hanung Bramantyo, film director
- Harvey Malaihollo, singer (PDI-P)
- Hedi Yunus, singer
- Ian Kasela, musician (PDI-P)
- Indra Bekti, presenter
- Insan Nur Akbar, comedian
- Isyana Bagoes Oka, former news anchor (PSI)
- Iwa K, rapper
- JFlow, musician
- Kirana Larasati, actress (PDI-P)
- Krisdayanti, singer (PDI-P)
- Luna Maya, actress
- Manohara Odelia Pinot, actress (Nasdem)
- Mira Lesmana, film producer
- Mongol Stres, comedian and actor (Nasdem)
- Nafa Urbach, actress and singer (Nasdem)
- Nirina Zubir, actress
- Once Mekel, musician
- Raffi Ahmad, presenter
- Riri Riza, film director and producer
- Said Bajuri, actor (PKB)
- Sandhy Sondoro, musician
- Slank, rock band
- Sophia Latjuba, singer and actress
- Teza Sumendra, singer
- Tina Talisa, former news anchor (Nasdem)
- Tina Toon, singer (PDI-P)
- Tompi, singer, plastic surgeon
- Uus, comedian
- Via Vallen, singer
- Yuni Shara, singer

=== Religious figures ===
- Ahmad Muhtadi Dimyathi, Muslim cleric
- Ahmad Muwafiq, Muslim cleric
- Ahmad Syafi'i Maarif, former general chair of Muhammadiyah (1998–2005)
- Muhammad Luthfi bin Yahya, Muslim cleric
- Muhammad Syahir Alaydrus, Muslim cleric
- Nadirsyah Hosen, chair of Consultative Board of Nahdlatul Ulama special branch in Australia and New Zealand
- Said Aqil Siradj, general executive chairman of Nahdlatul Ulama (2010–present)
- Salim Jindan Baharun, Muslim cleric
- Yusuf Mansur, Muslim cleric

=== Newspapers, television channels, and other media ===
- MetroTV

== Endorsements for Prabowo Subianto ==
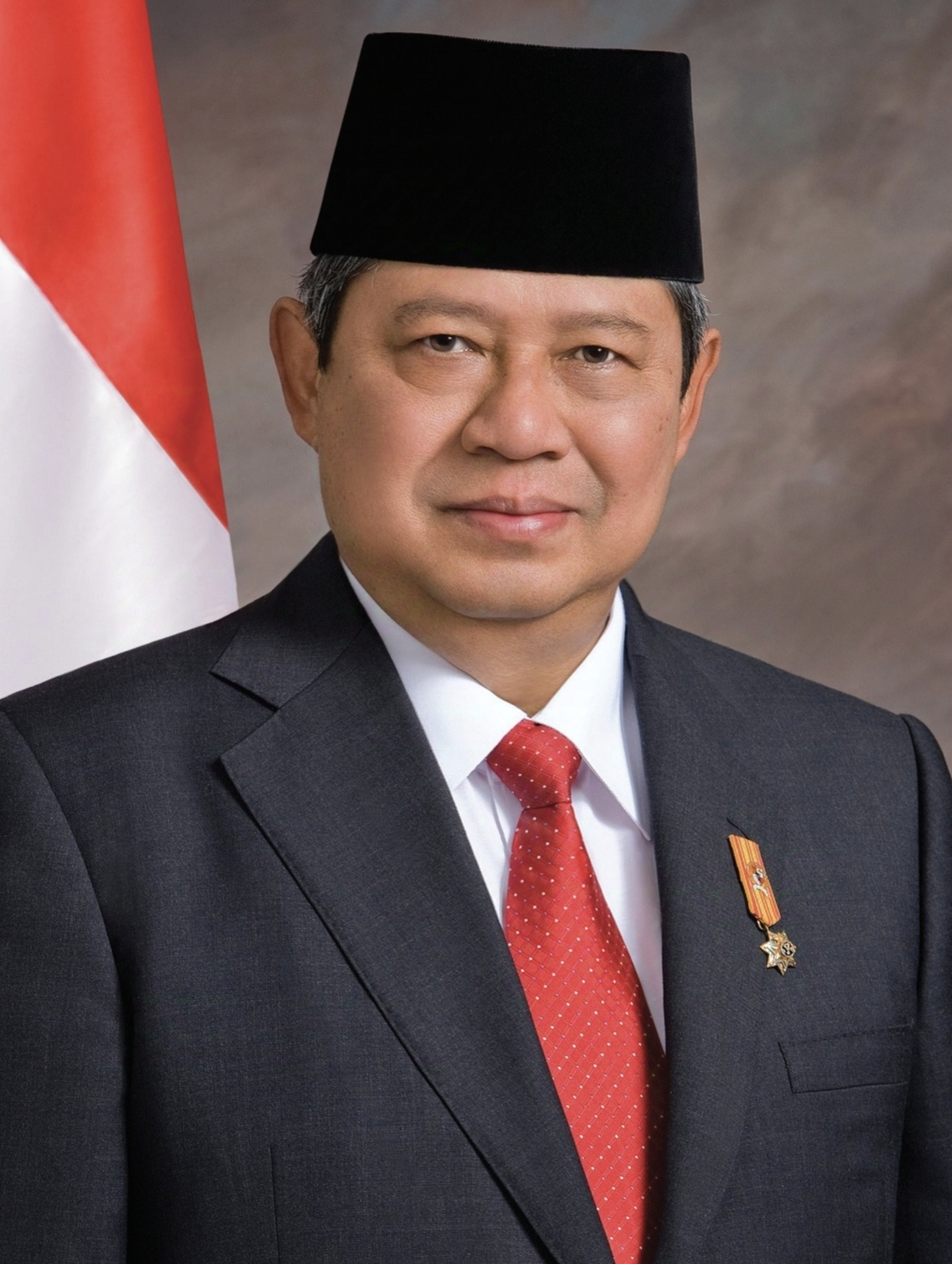
Susilo Bambang Yudhoyono

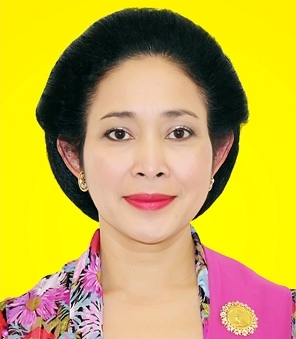
Titiek Suharto

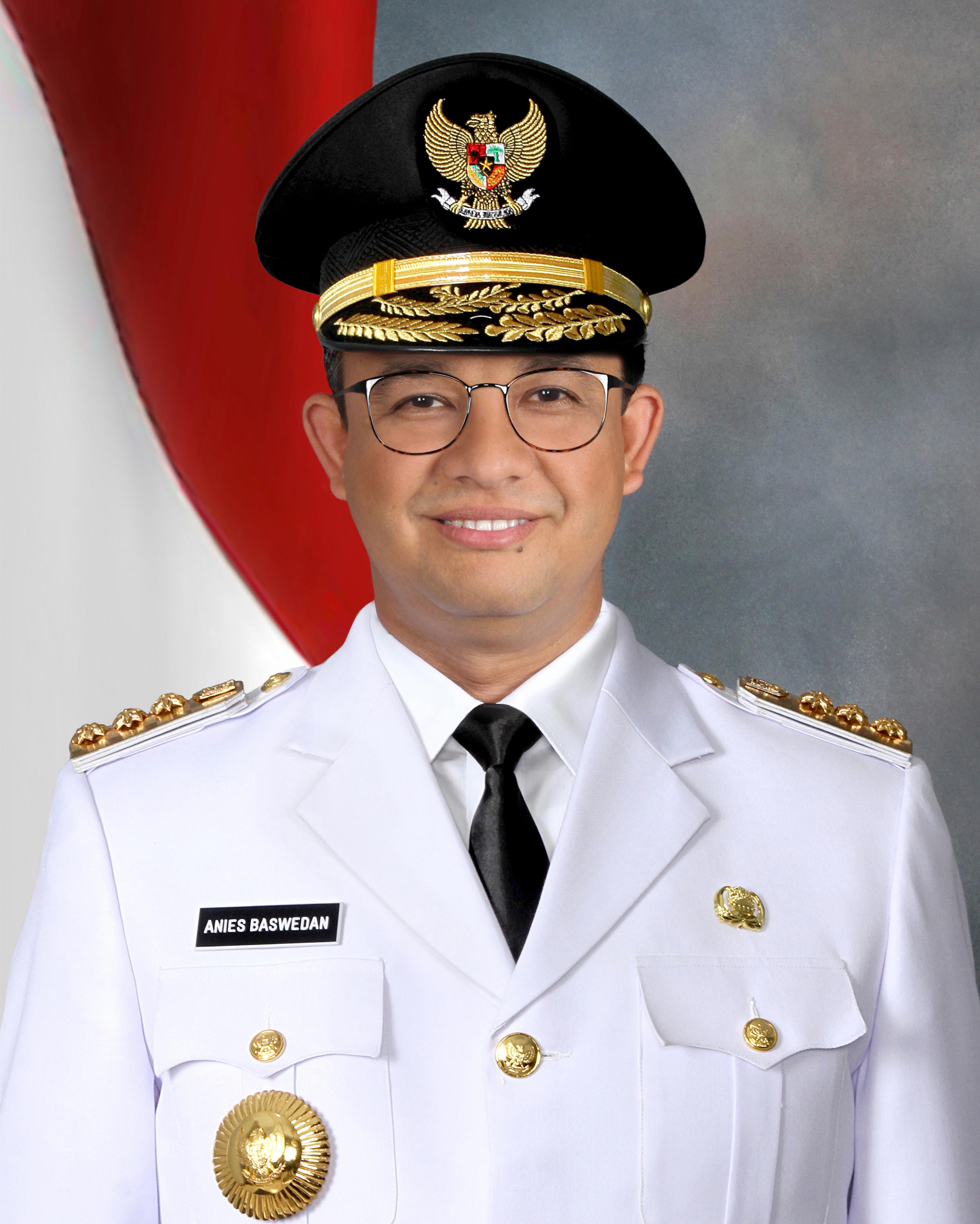
Anies Baswedan

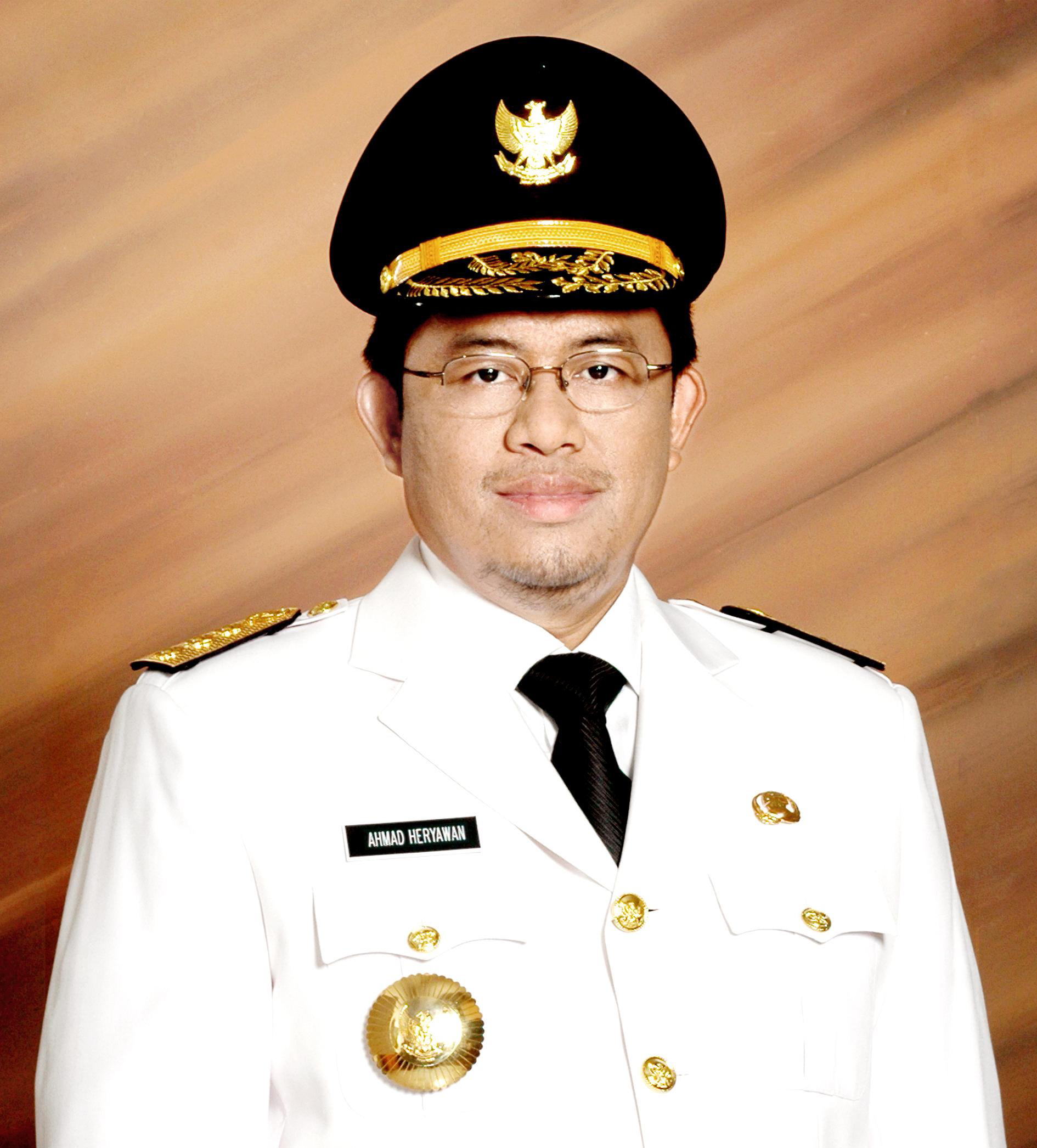
Ahmad Heryawan

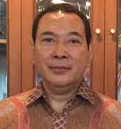
Tommy Suharto

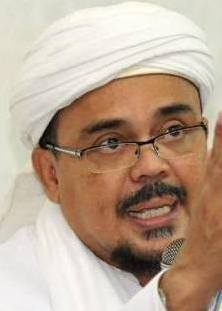
Muhammad Rizieq Shihab

=== Central government ===
==== President ====
- Gen. (Hons.) (ret.) Susilo Bambang Yudhoyono, 6th President of Indonesia (2004–14), former Coordinating Minister for Political and Security Affairs (2001–04, 2000–01 as Coordinating Minister for Political, Social, and Security Affairs), former Minister of Mining and Energy (1999–2000)

==== Cabinet-level officers ====
- Fuad Bawazier, former Minister of Finance (1998)
- Tutut Suharto, former Minister of Social Affairs (1998), daughter of 2nd President Suharto
- Lt. Gen. (ret.) Syarwan Hamid, former Minister of Home Affairs (1998–99), former Deputy Speaker of the DPR and MPR (1997–98)
- Lt. Gen. (ret.) Yunus Yosfiah, former Minister of Information (1998–99)
- Kwik Kian Gie, former State Minister of National Development Planning (2001–04), former Coordinating Minister for Economic, Financial, and Industrial Affairs (1999–2000), former Deputy Speaker of the MPR (1999) (PDI-P)
- Adhyaksa Dault, former State Minister of Youth and Sport (2004–09), former chair of Indonesian Scout Movement (2013–18)
- Malam Sambat Kaban, former Minister of Forestry (2004–09)
- Rachmawati Sukarnoputri, former member of Presidential Advisory Board of Indonesia (2007–09), daughter of 1st President Sukarno
- Salim Segaf Al-Jufri, former Minister of Social Affairs (2009–14)
- Tifatul Sembiring, former Ministry of Communication and Information Technology (2009–14)
- Amir Syamsuddin, former Minister of Law and Human Rights (2011–14)
- Dahlan Iskan, former Minister of State Owned Enterprises (2011–14), former businessman (Independent)
- Roy Suryo, former Minister of Youth and Sport (2013–14)
- Adm. (ret.) Tedjo Edhy Purdijatno, former Coordinating Minister for Political, Legal, and Security Affairs (2014–15), former Chief of Staff of the Indonesian Navy (2008–09)
- Ferry Mursyidan Baldan, former Minister of Land and Spatial Planning (2014–16) (Independent)
- Sudirman Said, former Minister of Energy and Mineral Resources (2014–16) (Independent)
- Rizal Ramli, former Coordinating Minister for Maritime Affairs (2015–16), former Coordinating Minister for Economic, Financial, and Industrial Affairs (2000–01) (Independent)
- Burhanuddin Abdullah, former Governor of Bank Indonesia (2003–08), former Coordinating Minister for Economic, Financial, and Industrial Affairs (2001)

==== Members of central parliamentary houses ====
- Zulkifli Hasan, Speaker of the MPR (2014–present), former Minister of Forestry (2009–14)
- Hidayat Nur Wahid, Deputy Speaker of the MPR (2014–present), former Speaker of the MPR (2004–09)
- Ahmad Muzani, Deputy Speaker of the MPR (2018–present)
- Fadli Zon, Deputy Speaker of the DPR (2014–present)
- Fahri Hamzah, Deputy Speaker of the DPR (2014–present)
- Syarief Hasan, DPR member (2004–09, 2014–present), former Minister of Cooperatives and Small and Medium Enterprises (2009–14, 2009–11 as State Minister of Cooperatives and Small and Medium Enterprises)
- Mardani Ali Sera, DPR member (2009–14, 2017–present), initiator of #2019GantiPresiden
- Eko Patrio, DPR member (2009–present), comedian
- Jamal Mirdad, DPR member (2009–present), actor, singer
- Primus Yustisio, DPR member (2009–present), actor
- Rachel Maryam, DPR member (2009–present), actress
- Fahira Idris, DPD member (2014–present)
- Amien Rais, former Speaker of the MPR (1999–2004)
- Dimyati Natakusumah, former DPR member (2009–18), former Deputy Speaker of the MPR (2014), former Regent of Pandeglang (2000–09).
- Marzuki Alie, former Speaker of the DPR (2009–14)
- Sohibul Iman, former DPR member (2009–17), former Deputy Speaker of the DPR (2013–14)
- Priyo Budi Santoso, former Deputy Speaker of the DPR (2009–14)
- Dedi Gumelar, former DPR member (2009–14), comedian
- Titiek Suharto, former DPR member (2014–18), Prabowo's former wife, daughter of 2nd President Suharto
- Marwan Batubara, former DPD member (2004–09)
- Rhoma Irama, former MPR member (1992–99), former DPR member (1997–99), musician
- Tommy Suharto, former DPR/MPR member (1992–98), son of 2nd President Suharto, general chair of Berkarya Party

==== Independent agencies and commissions officers ====
- Busyro Muqoddas, former chair of the Corruption Eradication Commission (2010–11), former chair of Judicial Commission of Indonesia (2005–10)
- Bambang Widjojanto, former vice chair of the Corruption Eradication Commission (2011–15)
- Jumhur Hidayat, former chair of Agency for Placement and Protection of Indonesian Workers (2007–14)
- Ansori Sinungan, former National Commission on Human Rights of Indonesia commissioner (2012–17)
- Siane Indriani, former National Commission on Human Rights of Indonesia commissioner (2012–17)
- Natalius Pigai, former National Commission on Human Rights of Indonesia commissioner (2012–17)

=== Provincial government ===
==== Governors and Vice Governors ====
- Erzaldi Rosman Djohan, Governor of Bangka-Belitung Islands (2018–present)
- Anies Baswedan, Governor of Jakarta (2017–present), former Minister of Education and Culture (2014–16) (Independent)
- Isran Noor, Governor of East Kalimantan (2018–present)
- Longki Djanggola, Governor of Central Sulawesi (2011–present)
- Hadi Mulyadi, Vice Governor of East Kalimantan (2018–present)
- Mohamad Lakotani, Vice Governor of West Papua (2017–present)
- Ahmad Heryawan, former Governor of West Java (2008–18)
- Lt. Gen. (ret.) Bibit Waluyo, former Governor of Central Java (2008–13)
- Lt. Gen. (ret.) Johannes Suryo Prabowo, former Vice Governor of East Timor (1998)
- Dede Yusuf, former Vice Governor of West Java (2008–13)
- Rustriningsih, former Vice Governor of Central Java (2008–13), former Regent of Kebumen (2000–08) (Independent)
- Muzakir Manaf, former Vice Governor of Aceh (2012–17) and former Commander of Free Aceh Movement

==== Members of provincial parliament ====
- Muhammad Taufik, Deputy Speaker of Jakarta Parliament (2014–present)

=== Municipal government ===
- Yulianto, Mayor of Salatiga (2011–16, 2017–present)
- Ibnu Sina, Mayor of Banjarmasin (2016–present)
- Iti Octavia Jayabaya, Regent of Lebak (2014–present).
- Rudy Gunawan, Regent of Garut (2014–present)
- Hengky Kurniawan, Vice Regent of West Bandung (2018–present), actor
- Taufik Nuriman, former Regent of Serang (2005–15)
- Begug Poernomosidi, former Regent of Wonogiri (2000–10)

=== Notable political figures ===
- Dahnil Anzar Simanjuntak, former general chair of Muhammadiyah Youth (2014–18) (Independent)
- Mamiek Suharto, daughter of 2nd President Suharto

=== Retired military and police personnel ===
==== Retired Indonesian Army personnel ====
- Gen. Djoko Santoso, former Commander of the Indonesian National Armed Forces (2007–10)
- Gen. Gatot Nurmantyo, former Commander of the Indonesian National Armed Forces (2015–17)
- Gen. George Toisutta, former Chief of Staff of the Indonesian Army (2009–11)
- Gen. Agustadi Sasongko Purnomo, former Chief of Staff of the Indonesian Army (2007–09)
- Gen. Tyasno Sudarto, former Chief of Staff of the Indonesian Army (1999–2000)
- Maj. Gen. Soenarko, former General Commander of the Kopassus (2007–08)
- Lt. Gen. Widjoyo Suyono, former General Commander of the Kopassus (1967–70)
- Maj. Gen. Sudrajat, former Ambassador of Indonesia to China, 2018 West Java gubernatorial candidate.
- Inf. Maj. Agus Harimurti Yudhoyono, son of 6th President Susilo Bambang Yudhoyono, 2017 Jakarta gubernatorial candidate

==== Retired Indonesian Air Force personnel ====
- Air Chf Mshl Imam Sufaat, former Chief of Staff of the Indonesian Air Force (2009–12)

==== Retired Indonesian National Police personnel ====
- Pol. Gen. Insp. (ret.) Sofjan Jacoeb, former chief of Greater Jakarta Metropolitan Regional Police (2001)

=== Businesspeople ===
- Hashim Djojohadikusumo, Prabowo's younger brother, Founders Board vice chair of Gerindra
- Lieus Sungkharisma
- Anthony Leong

=== Celebrities ===
- Ahmad Dhani, musician (Gerindra)
- Annisa Trihapsari, actress (Berkarya)
- Arie Untung, presenter
- Dhini Aminarti, actress
- Dimas Seto, actor
- Elly Sugigi, comedian
- Endang S. Taurina, singer
- Fauzi Baadilla, actor (Gerindra)
- Frans Mohede, musician
- Irwansyah, singer
- Ismi Azis, singer
- Jaja Miharja, singer
- Jane Shalimar, actress (Demokrat)
- Kiwil, comedian
- Mulan Jameela, singer (Gerindra)
- Narji, comedian (PAN)
- Neno Warisman, actress, initiator of #2019GantiPresiden
- Nissa Sabyan, singer
- Ozy Syahputra, actor
- Priscillia Sari Dewi, former member of JKT48
- Ratna Sarumpaet, film director
- Sultan Djorghi, actor (Berkarya)
- Teuku Wisnu, Islamist actor
- Zaskia Sungkar, singer

=== Religious figures ===
- Aa Gym, Islamic preacher
- Abdul Somad, Islamic preacher
- Bahar bin Smith, Islamic preacher and FPI member
- Haikal Hassan Baras, Islamic preacher
- Muhammad Arifin Ilham, Islamic preacher
- Muhammad Rizieq Shihab, leader of Islamic Defenders Front (FPI)
- Tengku Zulkarnain, Islamic preacher, Indonesian Ulema Council deputy secretary-general
