= 2024 Bogor regency election =

Local election in Bogor Regency, Indonesia

- 27 November 2024
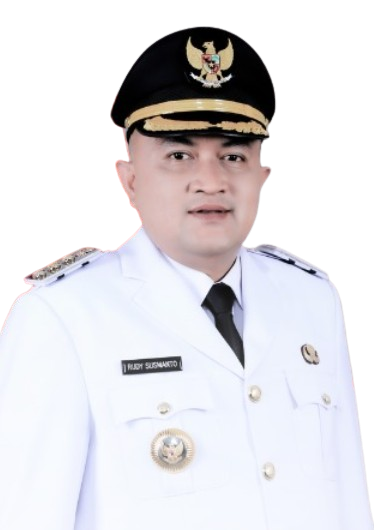

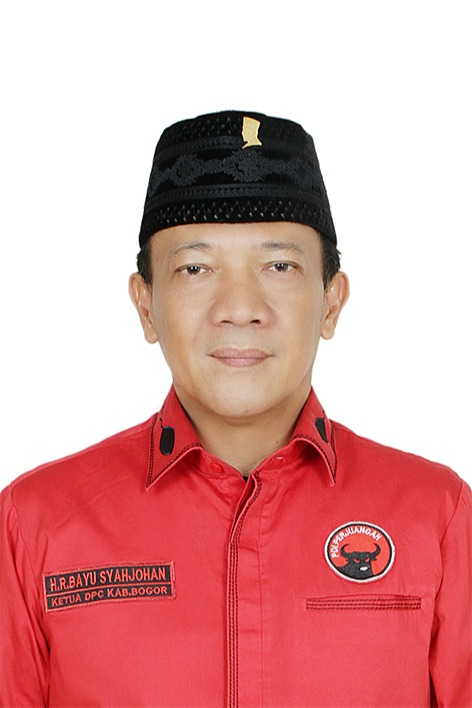
Candidate	Rudy Susmanto	Bayu Syahjohan
Party	Gerindra	PDI-P
Running mate	Ade Ruhandi	Musyafaur Rahman
Popular vote	1,559,328	599,453
Percentage	72.23%	27.77%
- Results by district and subdistrict (Interactive version)
Regent before election
Bachril Bakri (acting)
Independent
Elected Regent
Rudy Susmanto
Gerindra

The 2024 Bogor regency election was held on 27 November 2024 as part of nationwide local elections to elect the Regent of Bogor Regency for a five-year term. The previous regency election was held in 2018.

== Electoral system ==
The election, like other local elections in 2024, follow the first-past-the-post system where the candidate with the most votes wins the election, even if they do not win a majority. It is possible for a candidate to run uncontested, in which case the candidate is still required to win a majority of votes "against" an "empty box" option. Should the candidate fail to do so, the election will be repeated on a later date.

== Candidates ==
According to electoral regulations, candidates are required to secure support from 11 seats in the Bogor Regency Regional House of Representatives (DPRD). The Gerindra Party, with 12 seats in the DPRD, is the only party eligible to nominate a candidate without forming coalitions with other parties. Candidates may alternatively demonstrate support in form of photocopies of identity cards, which in Bogor's case corresponds to 252,814 copies. Out of three independent candidates registering, Indonesian Solidarity Party politician Gunawan Hasan managed to submit the necessary amount of identity cards and therefore qualified for the election pending a General Elections Commission verification.

=== Declared ===
These are candidates who have been allegedly delegated by political parties endorsing for regency election:

1
Candidate from Gerindra and Golkar
Rudy Susmanto	Ade Ruhandi
for Regent	for Vice Regent
Speaker of the Bogor Regency Regional House of Representatives (2019–2024)	Speaker of the Bogor Regency Regional House of Representatives (2014–2019); 2018 regency nominee
Parties
50 / 55 (91%) Gerindra (12 seats); Golkar (7 seats); PKS (7 seats); PKB (6 seats); PPP (6 seats); Demokrat (6 seats); NasDem (4 seats); PAN (2 seats)

2
Candidate from PDIP
Bayu Syahjohan	Musyafaur Rahman
for Regent	for Vice Regent
Politician and 2018 vice regency nominee	Commissioner of PT Petrokimia Kayaku
Parties
5 / 55 (9%) PDI-P (5 seats)

=== Potential ===
The following are individuals who have either been publicly mentioned as a potential candidate, or considered as such by press:

- Iwan Setiawan (Gerindra), incumbent regent.
- Ade Ruhandi (Golkar), former Speaker of Bogor Regency DPRD, 2018 Bogor regency election candidate.
- Gunawan Hasan (PSI), former member of Bogor Regency DPRD, two-time Bogor regency election candidate.

== Political map ==
Following the 2024 Indonesian general election, nine political parties are represented in the Bogor Regency DPRD:

Political parties	Seat count
Great Indonesia Movement Party (Gerindra)	12 / 55
Party of Functional Groups (Golkar)	7 / 55
Prosperous Justice Party (PKS)	7 / 55
National Awakening Party (PKB)	6 / 55
United Development Party (PPP)	6 / 55
Democratic Party (Demokrat)	6 / 55
Indonesian Democratic Party of Struggle (PDI-P)	5 / 55
NasDem Party	4 / 55
National Mandate Party (PAN)	2 / 55

== Results ==
Candidate	Running mate	Party	Votes	%
Rudy Susmanto	Ade Ruhandi	Gerindra Party	1,559,328	72.23
Bayu Syahjohan	Musyafaur Rahman	Indonesian Democratic Party of Struggle	599,453	27.77
Total			2,158,781	100.00
Valid votes			2,158,781	93.65
Invalid/blank votes			146,461	6.35
Total votes			2,305,242	100.00
Registered voters/turnout			3,926,080	58.72
Source: KPU
