= Iwan Setiawan (politician) =

Indonesian politician

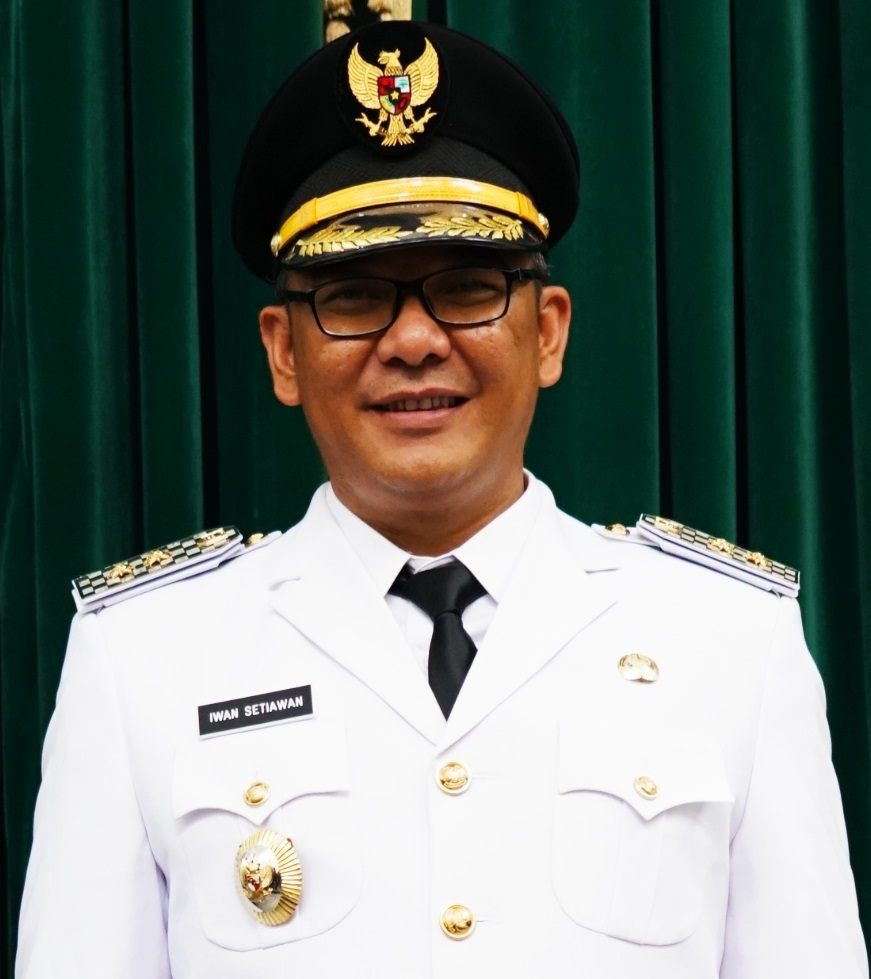
- Official portrait

Regent of Bogor
- In office 2 September 2023 – 30 December 2023; Acting: 28 April 2022 – 2 September 2023
- Preceded by: Ade Yasin
- Succeeded by: Asmawa Tosepu (act.); Bachril Bakri (act.); Rudy Susmanto

Vice Regent of Bogor
- In office 30 December 2018 – 28 April 2022
- Preceded by: Nurhayanti
- Succeeded by: Ade Ruhandi

Member of Bogor Regency DPRD
- In office 27 August 2009 – 2018

Personal details
- Born: 2 December 1970 (age 54); Bogor, West Java, Indonesia
- Political party: Gerindra

Iwan Setiawan (born 2 December 1970) is an Indonesian politician of the Gerindra Party who was the regent of Bogor Regency between 2022 and 2023, mostly as acting mayor replacing Ade Yasin who had been arrested by the Corruption Eradication Commission. Prior to becoming mayor, Setiawan had been Yasin's vice mayor between 2018 and 2022, and was a member of the regency's Regional House of Representatives for two terms since 2009.

== Biography ==
Iwan Setiawan was born in Bogor on 2 December 1970. He graduated from Pakuan University in 1996. For some time, he worked at a financing and a leasing company, before entering politics in 2009. He was elected into the Bogor Regency Regional House of Representatives (DPRD) following the 2009 election as a member of Gerindra Party, and was sworn in on 27 August 2009. He was reelected for a second term after in 2014, and became the deputy speaker of the DPRD.

In the 2018 regency election for Bogor, Setiawan ran as the running mate to Ade Yasin. The pair won the election and was sworn in on 30 December 2018. On 28 April 2022, he was appointed as acting regent as Yasin was arrested by the Corruption Eradication Commission for a bribery case.

Setiawan became full regent on 2 September 2023, months before the end of his tenure. Shortly after his appointment as full regent, he conducted large-scale reshuffles in the regency government, repositioning hundreds of municipal employees. His term expired on 30 December 2023, and he was replaced by Asmawa Tosepu as acting regent.

== Personal life and family ==
He is married to Halimatussadiyah Iwan, and they have five children. Their daughter, Nurunnisa Setiawan, ran for a seat in the Bogor Regency DPRD in 2024 and won a seat.

He published an autobiography in 2023.
