= Politeknik Industri Furnitur dan Pengolahan Kayu =

Technical school in Java, Indonesia

Furniture Industry and Wood Processing Polytechnic
- Furniture Polytechnic
- Logo of Furniture Industry and Wood Processing Polytechnic
- Motto: creative, innovative, competent, ready to work
- Type: State University, Polytechnic
- Established: 2018
- Director: Dr. Peni Shoffiyati
- Students: 99 (2018)
- Location: Kendal Regency, Central Java, Indonesia
- Campus: Yellow
- Colors: Red Green
- Website: www.poltek-furnitur.ac.id

PTN in Indonesia (abbreviated Polifurneka, Furniture Industry and Wood Processing Polytechnic) is a state technical college located in Kendal Regency, Central Java, Indonesia. The college opened in 2018.

== History ==
Kendal Wood Furniture and Processing Industry Polytechnic (Kendal Furniture Polytechnic) is a State Vocational Higher Education institution established to meet the needs of competent furniture experts for the furniture industry. It was established by the Ministry of Industry and opened in 2018. Its founding director was Tri Ernaati, M.Si. Peni Shoffiyati became the director in 2022.

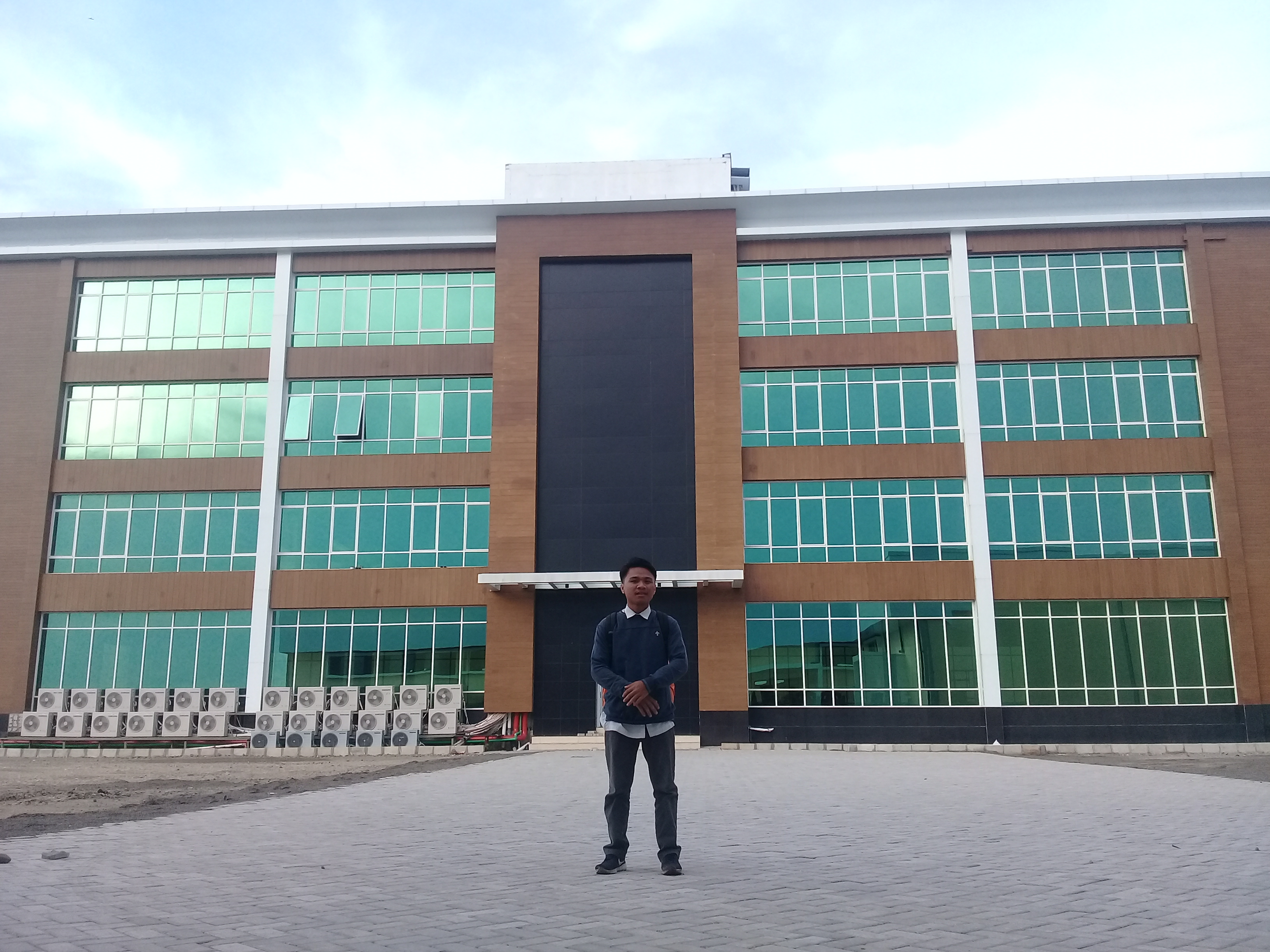
left Back view of the polytechnic campus

== Campus ==
The polytechnic is located at Jalan Wanamarta Raya No. 20, Industrial Estate, Kendal Regency, Central Java, Indonesia. The campus consists of 4,800 square meters of land.

== Academics ==
Students may attend the school for five years free of charge. The polytchnic offers three training programs:

- Furniture Design Study Program
- Furniture Industry Business Management Study Program
- Furniture Production Engineering Study Program
