= Rachmat =

Rachmat is a given name and can also be a surname, and is most prevalent in Indonesia. Used as a given name, it was found 512 times in 15 different countries, while 323 times in at least 12 countries as a surname. Rachmat is often a name given for male.

Notable people with the given name include:

- Rachmat Afandi (born 1984), Indonesian footballer
- Rachmat Irianto (born 1999), Indonesian footballer
- Rachmat Kartolo (1938–2001), Indonesian actor and singer
- Rachmat Latief (born 1988), Indonesian footballer
- Rachmat Yasin (born 1963), Indonesian politician

== Meaning ==
In Arabic origin, the name Rachmat means "mercy" and "clemency".
