= Rachmat Yasin =

Indonesian politician

Regent of Bogor
- In office 30 December 2008 – 25 November 2014
- Preceded by: Agus Utara Effendi
- Succeeded by: Nurhayanti

Speaker of Bogor Regency Council
- In office 2004–2008

Member of Bogor Regency Council
- In office 1997–2008

Personal details
- Born: 4 November 1963 (age 61); Bogor Regency, Indonesia
- Political party: United Development Party

Rachmat Yasin (born 4 November 1963) or Rahmat Yasin is an Indonesian politician from the United Development Party who served as the regent of Bogor Regency between 2008 and 2014. He was convicted of receiving bribes in 2014, and again in 2019. Before becoming regent, he had served some time in the regency's legislative body.

== Background ==
Yasin was born in Bogor on 4 November 1963.

== Career ==
Before being elected to public office, Yasin had been active at Nahdlatul Ulama, being the leader of Ansor Youth Movement's Bogor branch between 1984 and 1991. He was elected to Bogor's municipal council (DPRD Kabupaten Bogor) in 1997, and following the 2004 legislative election was appointed as its speaker.

In 2008, he was elected as regent after winning 990,351 votes (63.48%), being sworn in on 30 December 2008. He was reelected in 2013. He was also elected as chairman for PSSI's West Java office in 2013.

During his tenure, he destroyed multiple illegal villas in Puncak. He also initiated a program in which the regency's leaders and civil servants visited its subdistricts and villages weekly, dubbing them "Jumling" and "Boling" (Jumat Keliling and Rebo Keliling, lit. "Friday stroll" and "Wednesday stroll").

On 7 May 2014, he was apprehended by the Corruption Eradication Commission in his own house. Prior to his arrest, Yasin had been examined several times as a witness for other corruption cases. In November 2014, the Bandung Corruption Court sentenced him to 5.5 years in jail and a fine of Rp 300 million for charges of accepting Rp 4.5 billion of bribes to help with the conversion of woodlands areas. He was discharged dishonorably through a letter dated 20 January 2015, though he was previously discharged honorably in 25 November 2014 following a resignation he submitted. He was replaced by his deputy Nurhayanti. The corruption case also implicated Sentul City president director Swie Teng, who was sentenced to five years in prison for bribing Yasin.

During his incarceration, Rahmat managed to leave the prison and go to a rented house. The incident, along with some other graft convicts also doing the same, resulted in Law and Human Rights minister Yasonna Laoly opening an investigation into the prison staff.

He was freed in May 2019, but was made a suspect the following month for receiving bribes from a different source. He was sentenced to a further two years and eight months in jail, being released for a second time on parole in August 2022.

== Family ==
He is married to Elly Halimah Yasin, who is also active at the United Development Party. The couple has three children. Rahmat's sister Ade Yasin was elected as the regent of Bogor in the 2018 election.
