= Alamuddin Dimyati Rois =

Indonesian politician (1980–2025)

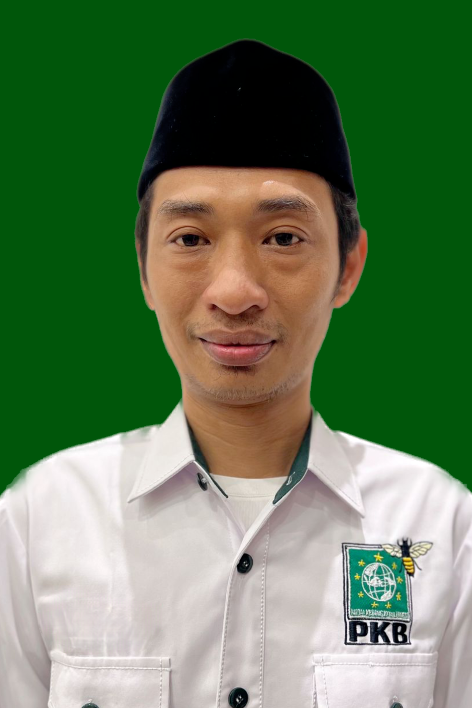
- Rois in 2023

Member of People's Representative Council
- In office 1 October 2009 – 6 May 2025
- Constituency: Central Java I

Personal details
- Born: 26 December 1980 Kendal, Central Java, Indonesia
- Died: 6 May 2025 (aged 44) Pekalongan, Central Java, Indonesia
- Citizenship: Indonesia
- Party: National Awakening Party
- Occupation: Politician

Alamuddin Dimyati Rois (26 December 1980 – 6 May 2025), also known as Gus Alam, was an Indonesian politician. He served as a member of the House of Representatives from the National Awakening Party, serving the 2009–2014, 2014–2019, 2019–2024, and 2024–2029 terms and representing the Central Java I electoral district (covering Semarang, Semarang Regency, Salatiga, and Kendal Regency). He died at 5:30 AM WIB on 6 May 2025, at Budi Rahayu Hospital in Pekalongan due to a car accident.

== Life and career ==
Born on 26 December 1980, Rois finished his high school education at Pelita Mandiri Senior High School in 2003. He graduated with a political science degree from Diponegoro University. He was the son of the Islamic scholar KH. Dimyati Rois, the caretaker of the Al-Fadllu Wal Fadhilah Islamic Boarding School in Kendal. In 2017, Rois founded and also served as the caretaker of the Al-Fadllu Wal Fadhilah 2 Islamic Boarding School. He served on Commission VIII, which was responsible for matters related to the Ministry of Religious Affairs, the Ministry of Social Affairs, the Ministry of Women Empowerment and Child Protection, and zakat.

=== Death ===
In the early morning of 2 May 2025, Rois was returning from a religious gathering in Brebes when he was involved in a car accident on the Pemalang-Batang Toll Road, in Karangasem, Pemalang. Two people were killed and two injured; Rois was hospitalised at Budi Rahayu Hospital in Pekalongan, with head trauma and fractures in his right wrist and ring finger. Despite surgery, Rois died at 5:30 a.m. WIB. He was 44.
