= Kendal Regency =

Regency in Central Java, Indonesia

Coordinates: 7.0256°S 110.1685°E

Kendal Regency Kabupaten Kendal
- Regency
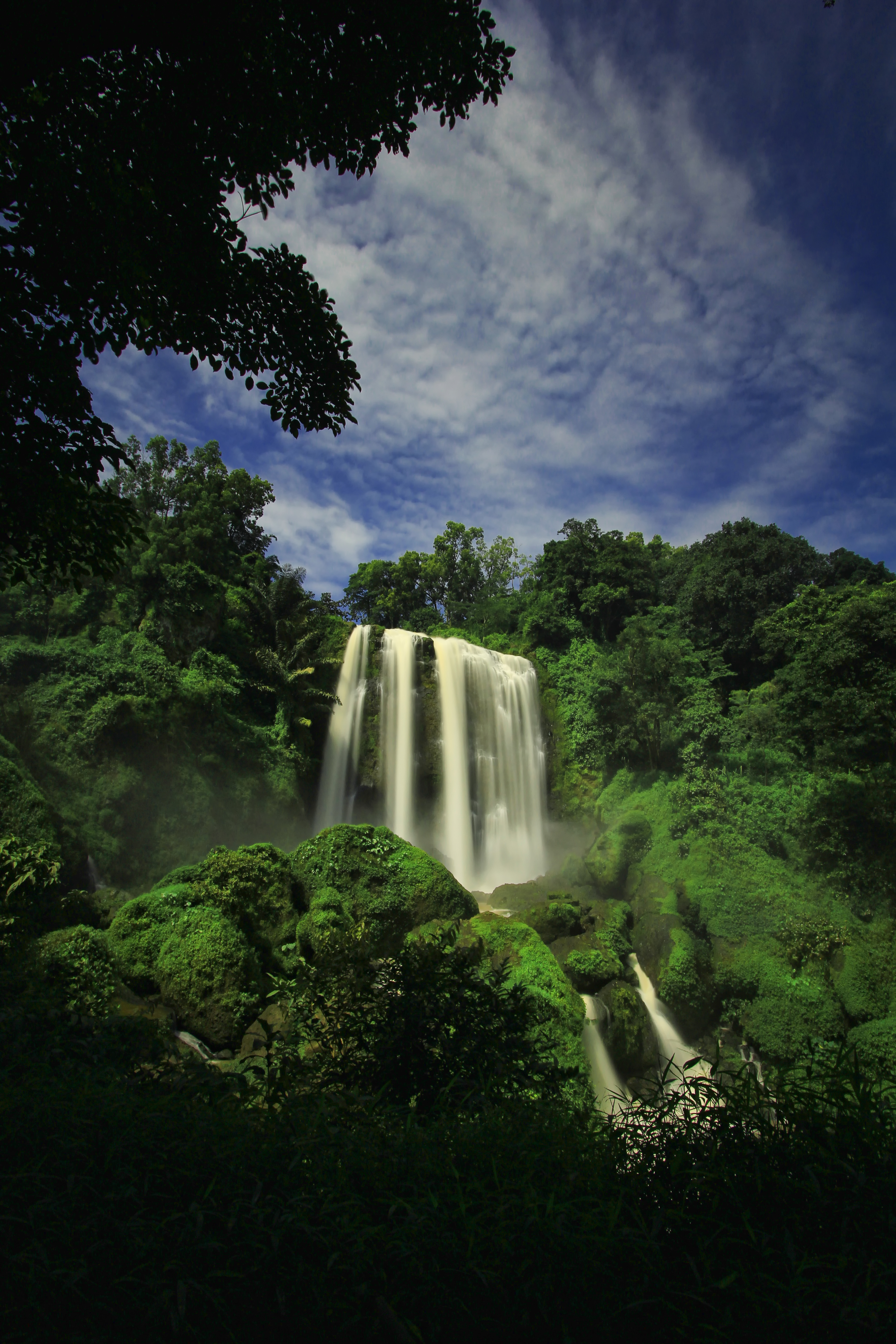
- Curug Sewu waterfall

- Coat of arms
- Motto(s): Ngesti Widdhi; Kendal BERIBADAT (Bersih, Indah, Barokah, Damai, Aman, Tertib) (Clean, Beautiful, Blessing, Peaceful, Safe, Orderly)
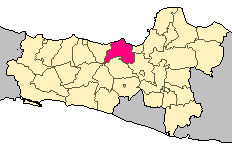
- Kendal Regency in Central Java
- Country: Indonesia
- Province: Central Java
- Established: 28 July 1605
- Founder: Tumenggung Bahurekso
- Seat: Dewan Perwakilan Rakyat Daerah Kabupaten

Government
  - Regent: Dyah Kartika Permanasari
  - Vice Regent: Benny Karnadi

Area
  - Total: 1,003.23 km^{2} (387.35 sq mi)

Population (mid 2025 estimate)
  - Total: 1,076,483
  - Density: 1,073.02/km^{2} (2,779.10/sq mi)
- Time zone: UTC+7 (WIB)
- Area code: +62294
- Vehicle registration: H
- Website: kendalkab.go.id

Kendal (Javanese: ꦏꦼꦤ꧀ꦣꦭ꧀, romanized: Kendhal) is a regency in the northern part of Central Java province in Indonesia, west of Semarang. The regency is bordered by the Java Sea in the north, Semarang City and Semarang Regency in the east, Temanggung Regency in the south, and Batang Regency in the west. Kendal Regency was established on 28 July, 1605. Its administrative capital is the town of Kendal, which is also known as the City of Santri because there are thousands of Ponpes, especially in Kaliwungu District and it is also known as the City of Arts and Culture. The regency covers a land area of 1,003.23 km^{2} and had a population of 900,313 at the 2010 census and 1,018,505 at the 2020 census; the official estimate as at mid 2025 was 1,076,483, consisting of 541,965 (50.35%) males and 534,518 (49.65%) females.

== History ==
The name Kendal was taken from the name of a tree, the Kendal Tree. No one at first knew its name, but when Pakuwojo hid in the tree, it was brightly lit. Finally the tree was called the Qondhali tree, which means lighting, and the area where the tree was, was called Qondhali because Javanese were not fluent in Arabic and later became Kendal. The lush leafy tree has been known since the time of the Demak Kingdom in 1500-1546 AD, during the reign of Sultan Trenggono. At the beginning of his reign in 1521, Sultan Trenggono once ruled Sunan Katong to order heirlooms to Pakuwojo. The events that caused the conflict and resulted in the death were recorded in the Inscription. Even now, the tomb of the two figures in Kendal's history in Protomulyo Village, Kaliwungu District, is still widely sacred to the community. According to the story, Sunan Katong was stunned by the beauty and longing of Kendal trees that grew in the surrounding environment. While enjoying the view of the Kendal tree that looks "sari", he mentioned that in the area later it would be called "Kendalsari". The big tree that the people mentioned was located on the edge of Kendal Youth Street was also known as Kendal Growing because the stem was hollow or growing.

A young man named Joko Bahu, a court servant of the Mataram kingdom, was someone who loved others and a hard worker until Joko Bahu succeeded in advancing his area. For this success, Sultan Agung Adi Prabu Hanyokrokusumo finally appointed him as the Kendal Regent, entitled Tumenggung Bahurekso. In addition Tumenggung Bahurekso was also appointed as Commander of the Mataram War on August 26, 1628, to lead tens of thousands of soldiers to invade the VOC in Batavia. In the battle on 21 October, 1628 in Batavia, Tumenggung Bahurekso and his two sons died as Kusuma Bangsa. From the journey of Sang Tumenggung Bahurekso led the VOC attack in Batavia on August 26, 1628, which was then used as a benchmark for the history of the birth of Kendal Regency. Further development with the momentum of the death of Tumenggung Bahurekso as the determination of the anniversary was considered by some to be inappropriate. Because the momentum was a dark history for a character named Bahurekso, it was feared to bring psychological effects. The emergence of the term "fail and fall" in Javanese mythology was feared to form psychological biases that influence the behavior of the pattern of taste, creativity and intentions of the people of Kendal Regency, so that it felt

Kaliwungu triumphed as the centre of government at the inception of Kendal Regency. However, due to the political conditions in the center of Mataram at that time and the consideration of the development of the government, the centre of government was moved to Kendal District. So that finally Kaliwungu is only used for the residence of the father of the Regent, who is often referred to as Kuhan, whereas the government administration is in Kendal District.

During the New Order era, the regency was the site of the Plantungan concentration camp, where former Communist Party and Gerwani members were imprisoned from 1971 to 1979.

== Government ==
=== Administrative districts ===
Kendal Regency consists of twenty administrative districts (kecamatan), tabulated below with their areas and their populations at the 2010 census and the 2020 census, together with the official estimates as at mid 2025. The table also includes the locations of the district administrative centres, the number of administrative villages in each district (totaling 266 rural desa and 20 urban keluraham - the latter all in Kendal town District), and its post code.

Kode Wilayah	Name of District (kecamatan)	Area in km^{2}	Pop'n census 2010	Pop'n census 2020	Pop'n estimate mid 2025	Admin centre	No. of villages	Post code
33.24.01	Plantungan	48.82	28,826	32,586	34,419	Tirtomulyo	12	51362
33.24.03	Sukorejo	76.01	57,080	60,399	61,922	Sukorejo	18	51363
33.24.02	Pageruyung	51.43	31,487	35,671	37,714	Pageruyung	14	51361
33.24.04	Patean	93.94	46,892	52,105	54,610	Curugsewu	14	51364
33.24.05	Singorojo	119.32	46,757	52,854	55,826	Ngareanak	13	51382
33.24.06	Limbangan	71.72	30,722	34,937	37,001	Limbangan	16	51383
33.24.07	Boja	64.09	69,417	82,443	89,042	Boja	18	51381
Sub-totals	South (highland) area	525.33	311,181	351,995	370,534		105	
33.24.08	Kaliwungu	47.73	58,514	66,157	69,883	Sarirejo	9	51372
33.24.20	Kaliwungu Selatan (South Kaliwungu)	65.19	44,495	54,251	55,753	Magelung	8	51372 -51382
Sub-totals	North-east (Kaliwungu) area	112.92	103,009	120,408	125,636		17	
33.24.09	Brangsong	34.54	44,662	50,611	53,516	Brangsong	12	51371
33.24.10	Pegandon	31.12	33,418	37,954	40,173	Tegorejo	12	51358
33.24.19	Ngampel	33.88	31,100	35,855	38,209	Ngampel Wetan	12	51357
33.24.11	Gemuh	38.17	45,360	52,409	55,905	Gemuh Blanten	16	51356
33.24.18	Ringinarum	23.50	31,866	36,620	38,968	Ringinarum	12	51359
33.24.12	Weleri	30.28	55,770	59,885	61,803	Penyangkringan	16	51355
33.24.16	Rowosari	32.64	46,151	53,566	57,256	Rowosari	16	51319^{(a)}
33.24.17	Kangkung	38.98	42,143	49,883	53,793	Kangkung	15	51353
33.24.13	Cepiring	30.08	46,932	52,654	55,426	Karangayu	15	51352
33.24.14	Patebon	44.30	54,612	60,085	62,693	Jambearum	18	51351
33.24.15	Kendal (town)	27.49	54,109	59,832	62,571	Karangsari	20 ^{(b)}	51311: 51319
Sub-totals	North (lowland) area	364.98	486,123	546,102	580,313		164	
	Totals	1,003.23	900,313	1,018,505	1,076,483	Kendal	286	

Note: (a) except one desa (Karangsari) for which the post code is 51354. (b) comprising the 20 kelurahan of Balok, Bandengan, Banyutowo, Bugangin, Candiroto, Jetis, Jotang, Kalibuntu Wetan, Karang Sari, Kebondalem, Ketapang, Langenharjo, Ngilir, Pakauman, Patukangan, Pegulon, Sijeruk, Sukodono, Trompo and Tunggulrejo.

Kendal town is the administrative headquarters. Besides Kendal, other significant district centres are Kaliwungu, Boja and Weleri. Kendal Regency has a coastline with a length of 41.0 kilometres.

In general, the Kendal Regency region is divided into two distinct areas, namely lowland areas in the north (with beaches) and highland areas in the south (mountains). The northern region of Kendal Regency is a low-lying area with an altitude between 0–10 metres above sea level, which includes the districts of Weleri, Rowosari, Kangkung, Cepiring, Gemuh, Ringinarum, Pegandon, Ngampel, Patebon, Kendal, Brangsong, and Kaliwungu. The southern part of Kendal Regency is a highland area consisting of mountainous land with an altitude between 10 and 2,579 metres above sea level, covering the districts of Plantungan, Pageruyung, Sukorejo, Patean, Boja, Singorojo, Limbangan and Kaliwungu Selatan.

=== List of Regents ===
Regent of Kendal
- Incumbent; Dico Mahtado Ganinduto, B.Sc since 26 February 2021
- Residence: Kendal Regency Hall
- Term length: 5 years

#	Regents	Length of Service
1	Tumenggung Bahurekso	1605-1629 (24 Years)
2	Raden Ngabehi Wiroseco	1629-1641 (12 Years)
3	Raden Ngabehi Mertoyudo	1641-1649 (8 Years)
4	Raden Ngabehi Wongsodiprojo	1649-1650 (1 Years)
5	Raden Ngabehi Wongsowiroprojo	1650-1661 (11 Years)
6	Raden Ngabehi Wongsowirosroyo	1661-1663 (2 Years)
7	Tumenggung Singowijoyo	1663-1668 (5 Years)
8	Tumenggung Mertowijoyo 1	1668-1700 (2 Years)
9	Tumenggung Mertowijoyo 2	1700-1725 (25 Years)
10	Tumenggung Mertowijoyo 3	1725-1739 (14 Years)
11	Tumenggung Singowijoyo 2	1739-1754 (15 Years)
12	Tumenggung Soemonegoro 1	1755-1780 (25 Years)
13	Tumenggung Soemonegoro 2	1780-1785 (5 Years)
14	Tumenggung Soerohadinegoro 1	1785-1796 (11 Years)
15	Pangeran Ario Prawirodiningrat 1	1796-1813 (16 Years)
16	Pangeran Ario Prawirodiningrat 2	1813-1830 (17 Years)
17	Raden Tumenggung Purbodiningrat	1830-1850 (20 Years)
18	Kyai Tumenggung Purbodiningrat	1850-1855 (5 Years)
19	Pangeran Ario Notohamiprojo	1857-1891 (34 Years)
20	Raden Mas Kamal Notonegoro	1891-1911 (20 Years)
21	Patih Raden cokro Hadisastro	1911-1914 (3 Years)
22	Raden Mas Adipati Notohamijoyo	1914-1938 (24 Years)
23	Raden Patih Notomudigdo	1938 (0 Years)
24	Raden Mas Saddin Purbonegoro	1938-1942 (4 Years)
25	Patih Raden Mas Kusuma Hudoyo	1942-1945 (3 Years)
26	Soekarmo	1945-1949 (4 Years)
27	Raden Ruslan	1949 (0 Years)
28	Raden Prayitno Partodijoyo	1950-1956 (6 Years)
29	Raden Sujono	1957-1960 (3 Years)
30	Raden Salatun	1960-1966 (6 Years)
31	Mayor Sunardi	1966-1967 (1 Years)
32	Letkol Suryo Suseno	1967-1972 (5 Years)
33	Abdus Saleh Ronowijoyo	1972-1979 (7 Years)
34	Drs. Herman Sumarmo	1979-1984 (5 Years)
35	Sudono Yusuf BA	1984-1989 (5 Years)
36	Sumoyo Hadiwinoto	1989-1998 (9 Years)
37	Drs. Djumadi	1999-2000 (1 Years)
38	Hendy Boedoro	2000-2008 (8 Years)
39	Dra. Siti Nurmarkesi	2008-2010 (2 Years)
40	Hj. Widya Kandi Susanti	2010-2015 (5 Years)
41	dr. Mirna Annisa	2016-2021 (5 Years)
42	Dico Mahtado Ganinduto, B.Sc	2021-Incumbent (5 Years)

Dutch Colonial Period
Japanese Colonial Period
Indonesian Independence Period

=== List of Vice Regents ===
Vice Regents of Kendal
- Incumbent; H. Windu Suko Basuki, SH since 26 February 2021

#	Vice Regents	Length of Service
1	Masduki Yusak	2000-2005
2	Dra. Siti Nurmarkesi	2005-2008
3	KH. Mustamsikin	2010-2015
4	Drs. Masrur Masykur	2016-2021
5	H. Windu Suko Basuki, SH	2021-Incumbent

== Sport ==
Kendal has a soccer club, the Persik Kendal. Its stadium is the Bahurekso Stadium. The stadium is located at Kebondalem Village, Kendal City. It also has some volleyball clubs at the Krida Bahurekso Gym.

== Industry ==
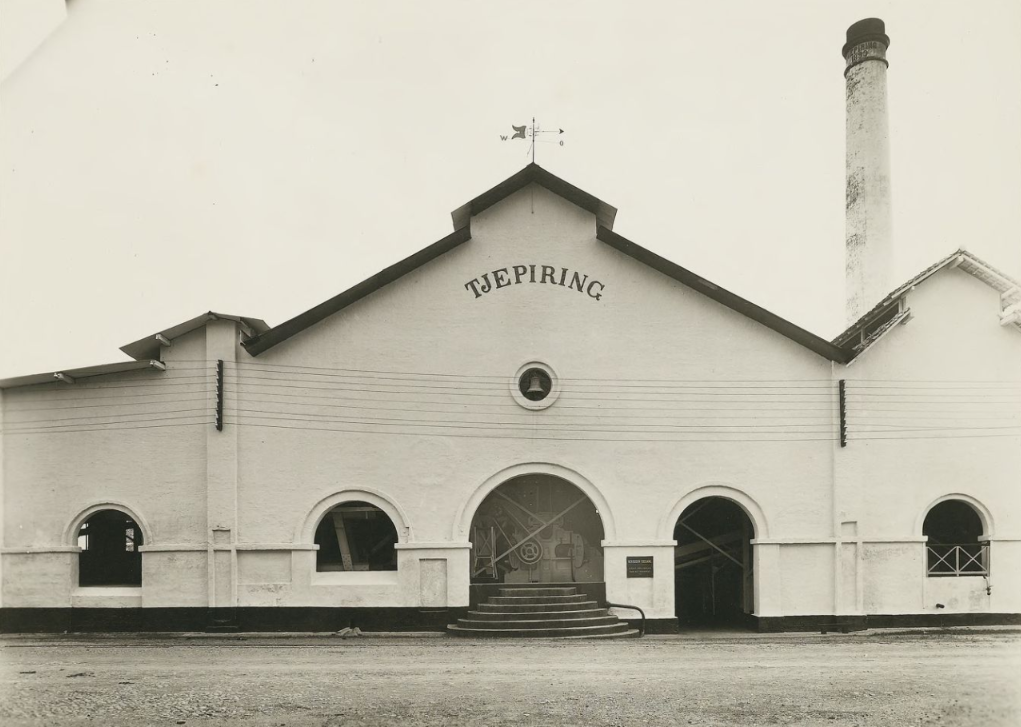
Sugar Factory in Cepiring In Dutch era.

One of the Industries in Kendal is Kendal Industrial Estate in Kaliwungu District and Sugar Factory in Cepiring District. The Sugar Factory in Cepiring has existed since the Dutch era.

== Tourism ==
=== Natural Tourism ===
- Ngebum Beach. Located In Kaliwungu
- Curug Sewu / Sewu Waterfall. Located in Patean
- Jeglong Waterfall. Located in Plantungan
- Cacaban Tourism Village. Located in Singorojo
- Sekatul Agrotourism. Located in Limbangan
- Muara Kencan beach. Located in Patebon
- Ngebruk Fruit Garden in Patean.
- Sendang Sikucing. Located in Rowosari
- Semawur Waterfall. Located in Plantungan
- Kiskendo Cave. Located in Singorojo
- Penglebur Gongso Waterfall. Located in Limbangan
- Selo Arjuno Hill. Located in Limbangan
- Tiban Island Tourism in Patebon.
- Gonoharjo Hot Spring. Located in Limbangan
- Medini Tea Plantation. Located in Limbangan

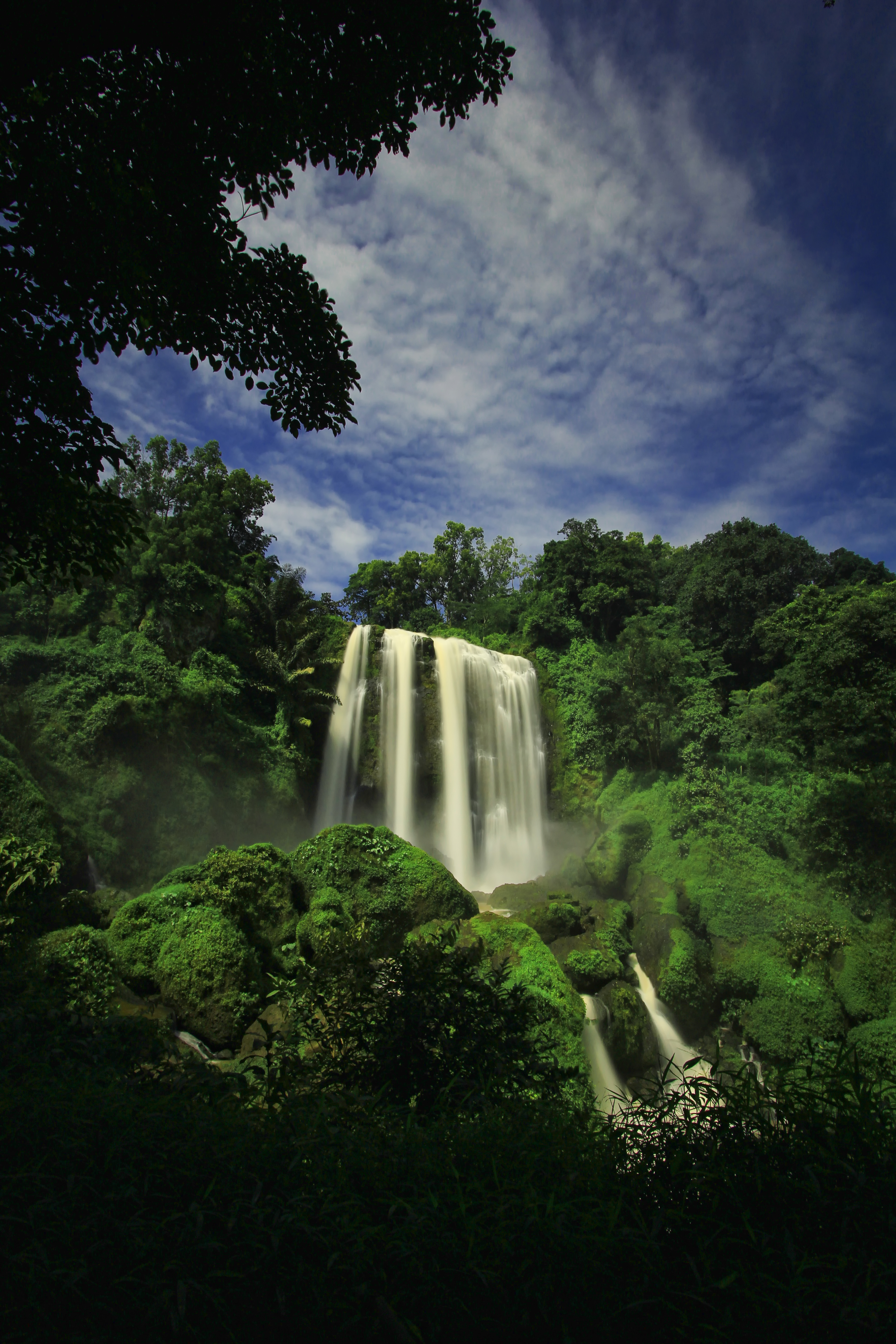
Sewu Waterfall/ Curug Sewu

=== Religious Tourism ===
- Wali Joko's Grave. Located in Kendal Mosque Complex
- Wali Hadi's Grave. Located in Kendal Mosque Complex
- The Tomb of Prince Djoeminah. Located in Kaliwungu
- Tomb of Sunan Bromo. Located in Boja
- Kyai Asyari's Grave. Located in Kaliwungu
- Wali Gembyang's Grave. Located in Kendal City
- The Tomb of Habib Mansyur Al Munawar. Located in Kendal City

=== Event ===
- Kendal Expo in Kebondalem Village. Kendal City
- Nyadran. In Kendal Coast
- Syawalan. In Kaliwungu and Boja

== Notable people ==
- Dr. Mirna Annisa (Regent of Kendal 2016 - 2021)
- Dr. Widya Kandi Susanti (Regent of Kendal 2010 - 2015)
- Don Murdono (Regent of Sumedang 2003 - 2013)
- H Tino Indra Wardono (Chairperson of Central Java KNPI)
- Alamuddin Dimyati Rois (Member of the House of Representatives)
- Achmad Rifa'i (Heroes of Struggle and Kyai).
- Tumenggung Bahurekso (First Regent of Kendal from 1605 to 1629)
- Bambang Irawan (Film Actor and Director)

== Typical Culinary ==
=== Food ===
- Mangut Lele
- Telur Ikan Mimi (Mimi Fish Eggs)
- Soto Kendal
- Momoh
- Sate Bumbon (Bumbon Satay)
- Brongkos
- Bebek Ijo (Green Fried Duck)
- Rica Rica Menthog
- Pecel Kembang Turi
- Krupuk Petis (Crackers)
- Rambak (Crackers)

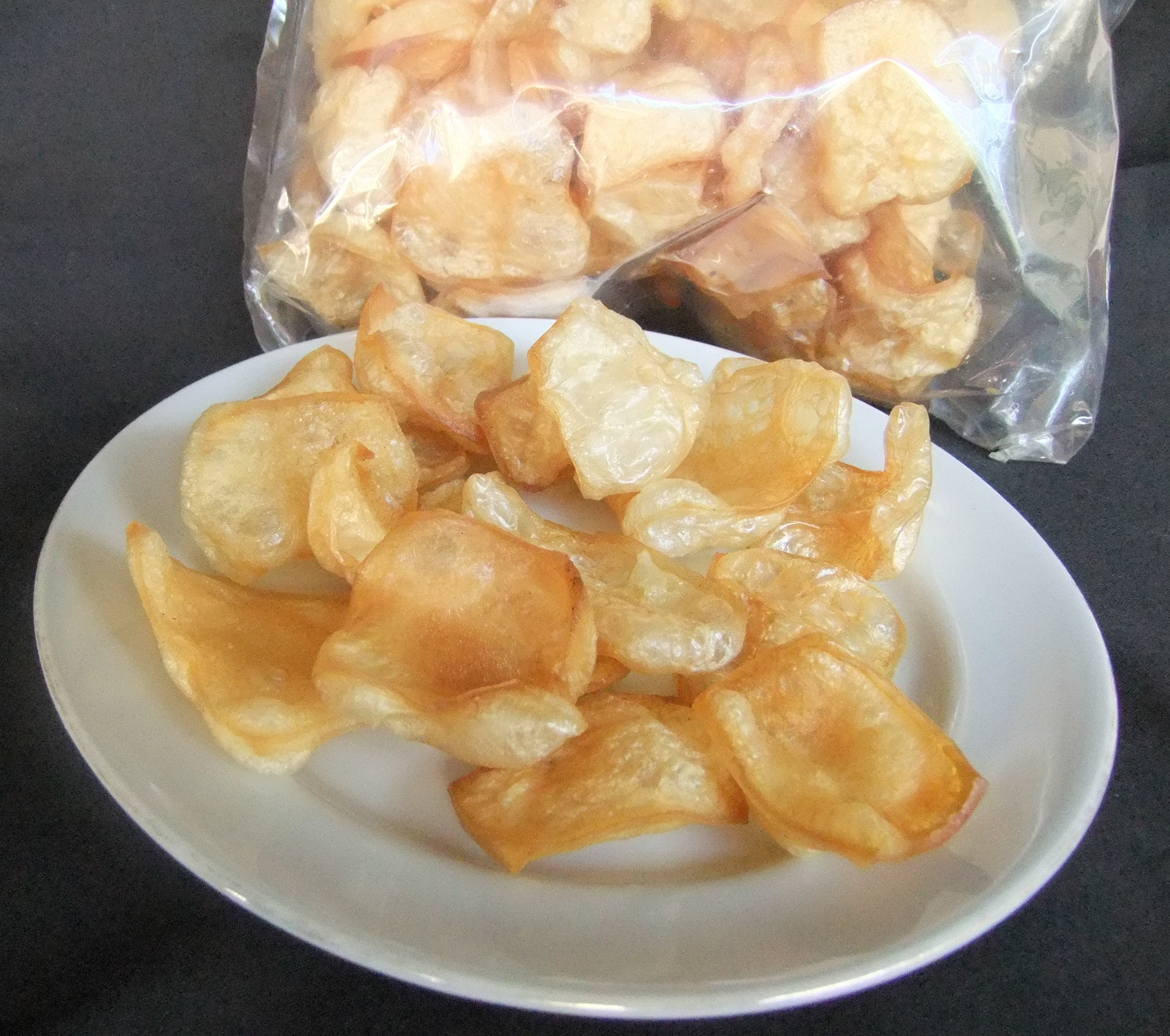
Rambak

=== Drink ===
- Kopi Cacaban (Cacaban Coffee)
- Bir Jawa (Java Beer)
- Dawet Sukun Ireng

== Gallery ==
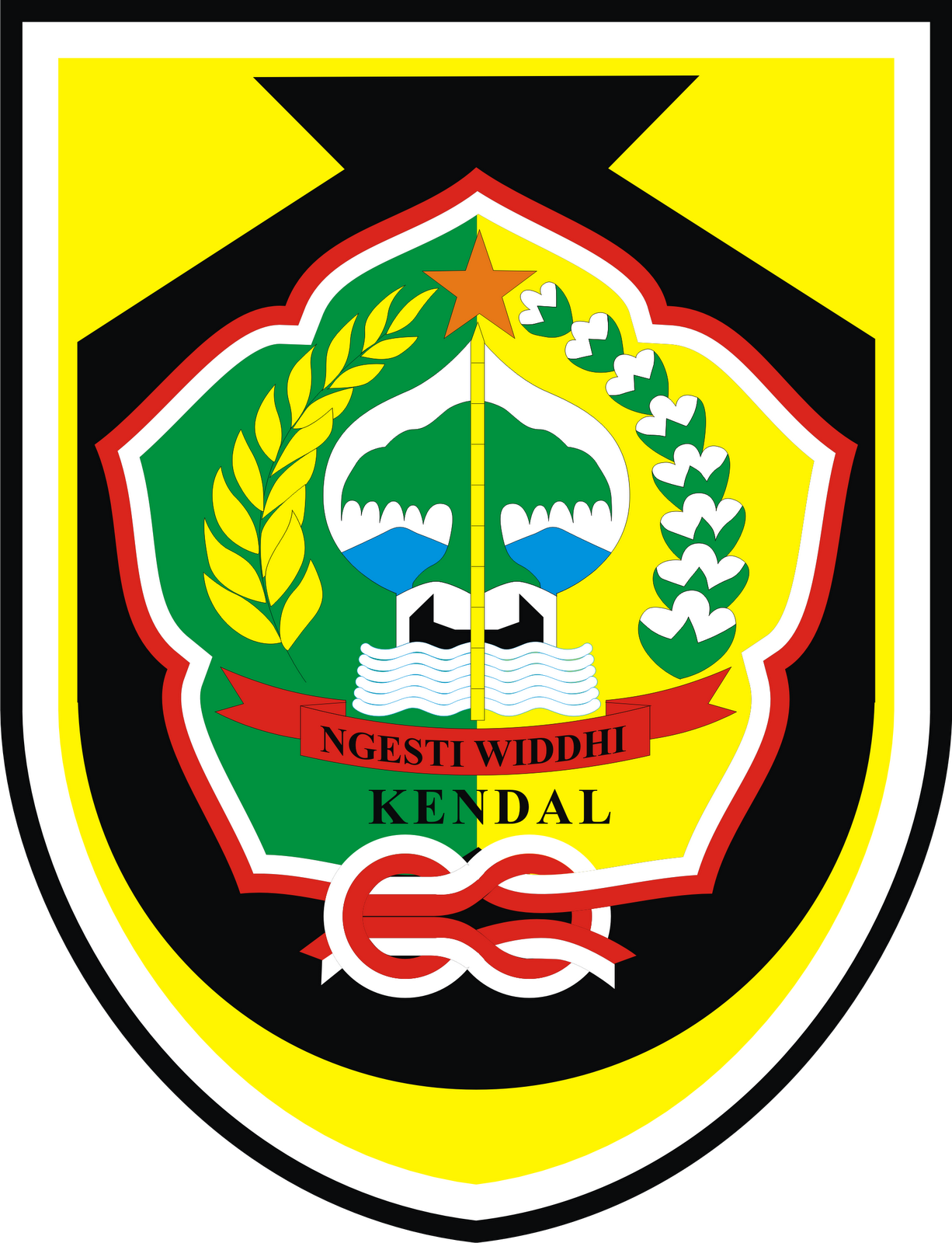
Former emblem of Kendal Regency replaced in 2011.
