= Kirana Larasati =

Indonesian actress (born 1987)

- Born: August 29, 1987 (age 38); Jakarta, Indonesia
- Occupations: Celebrity, Politician
- Years active: 2002 - present
- Spouse: Tama Gandjar (m. 2015)
- Children: 1

Kirana Larasati (born 29 August 1987) is an Indonesian actress, and politician born and raised in Jakarta, Indonesia. She made her acting debut in a television drama series Tunjuk Satu Bintang (2002). She won a best actress award in Festival Film Bandung for her role in the hit television series Azizah (2007). She is also a vocal advocate of anti-drug campaign which she supports through various charitable organisations.

== Career ==
Kirana Larasti began her acting career with minor roles in the television films after she was scouted by a casting director from PT Soraya Intercine Film. These parts led to her being cast as a series regular on the Indosiar drama series Itukan CInta (2004) alongside actors Sahrul Gunawan, Bertrand Antolin, and Fera Feriska. She rose to prominence as the lead role in Azizah, one of the most popular television show in the year 2007. She started acting in feature films in 2006 including Perempuan Punya Cerita (2007), Slank Gak Ada Matinya (Slank Never Dies) in 2013, and Turis Romantis (2015).

== Endorsements ==
- Vitacimin (2002) Takeda Japan
- Lovy Mint (2003)
- Biore (2003) Kao Japan
- Fres & Natural Soap (2003 - 2004)
- Fres & Natural Cologne (2004)
- Rexona (2005) Unilever
- Fuji Film (2006)
- Gery Cokluut (2006)
- Garuda Ting-Ting (2006)
- Flexi (2008) Telkom Indonesia

== Personal life ==
Kirana Larasati became engaged to the general manager of Oz Radio Tama Gandjar on May 9, 2015. Larasati and Gandjar were officially married on August 23, 2015 at Bandung, West Java. They have a son, Kyo Karura Gantama (born 2016).

== Filmography ==
=== Film ===
- 2006 Gotcha as Kayla
- 2006 D'Girlz Begins as Casandra
- 2007 Perempuan Punya Cerita as Safina
- 2008 Claudia/Jasmine as Claudia
- 2011 Purple Love as Shelly
- 2012 Sanubari Jakarta as the film director
- 2013 Slank Nggak Ada Matinya as April
- 2014 Kota Tua Jakarta as Dara
- 2015 Turis Romantis as Nabil
- 2015 Nenek Siam

=== Television ===
- Tunjuk Satu Bintang (2002)
- Senandung Masa Puber (2003 - 2004)
- Bidadari 3 (2003 - 2005)
- Kawin Gantung (2003 - 2005)
- Hati di Pucuk Sekali 1 (2003 - 2004)
- Itukan Cinta (2004)
- Tangisan Anak Tiri (2004 - 2005)
- Kehormatan 2 (2004)
- Hati di Pucuk Sekali 2 (2004)
- Jangan Berhenti Mencintaiku (2004 - 2006)
- Kala Cinta Menggoda (2005)
- Sweet 17 (2005)
- Titipan Ilahi (2005)
- Kurindu Jiwaku (2005)
- Habibi dan Habibah (2005 - 2006)
- Aku Bukan Untukmu (2006)
- Benci Bilang Cinta (2006)
- Kakak Iparku 17 Tahun (2007)
- Pasangan Heboh (2007)
- Azizah (2007) as Azizah
- Karissa (2008) as Karissa
- Cucu Menantu (2008 - 2009) as Vina
- Cinta Bunga 2 (2009) as Kasih/Bunga
- Cinta Indah 2 (2009) as Indah
- Tangisan Issabela (2009) as Isabella
- Cinta Nia (2009)
- Kesetiaan Cinta (2009) as Agnes
- 3 Sahabat (2010)
- The Real Action Series of ELANG (2014) as Karin
