= Yusuf Mansur =

Indonesian Islamic preacher, writer and businessman

H. Yusuf Mansur
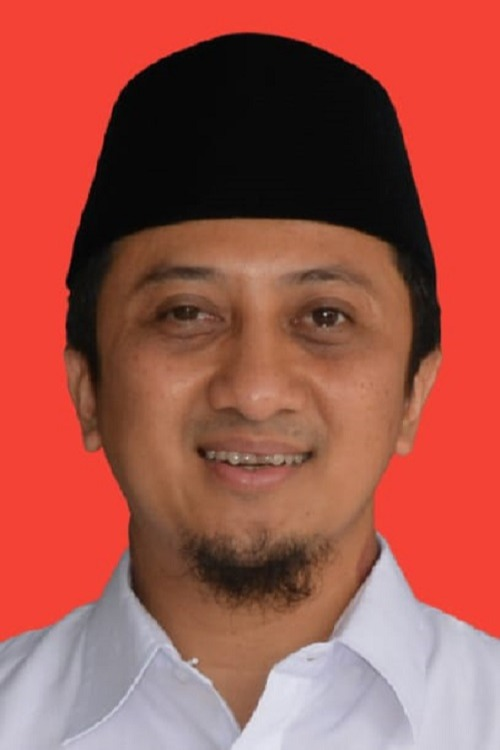
- Born: December 19, 1976 (age 49); Jakarta
- Other name: Ustadz YM
- Occupations: Tutor in pesantren, da'i
- Known for: Islamic preacher
- Spouse: Siti Maemunah
- Children: Wirda Salamah Ulya; Qumii Rahmatul Qulmul
- Parent(s): Abdurrahman Mimbar; Humrifíah

Jam'an Nurkhatib Mansur (born December 19, 1976), better known as Yusuf Mansur, is a popular Indonesian Islamic preacher, writer, and businessman from Jakarta, as well as the principal of the pesantren boarding school Daarul Qur'an Ketapang in Tangerang. He is considered as among the many pop Islamic preachers who employ pop psychology and management theory to promote and propagate Islam (dawah) through self-help seminars and televangelism.

== Early life ==
Mansur was born to a Betawi family and known for being pampered by his parents, and a smart child. He went through elementary education at Chairiyah Mansuriyah, Jakarta, and secondary education at Madrasah Aliyah Negeri 1 Grogol. He then continued his higher education at IAIN Syarif Hidayatullah department of law, majoring in shari'ah.

== Career ==
In 1996 he was involved in the business related to information technology, but his business caused him to become heavily indebted and put him in detention for two months. He repeated this in 1998. During his jail time, he considered that he discovered the wisdom of sadaqah (lit: benevolence, charity). After the release from the prison, he tried to restart a business from scratch by selling ice at Kalideres terminal. He eventually expanded his business to the retail of thermos and carts and then managed to own employees. He considers that his life began to change as he became acquainted with a policeman who introduced him to an NGO. During his work in the NGO, he wrote a book regarding sadaqah and his experience in prison, yearning for his parents.

Unexpectedly, the book received a tremendous applause. Yusuf Mansur was then offered invitations to the book review. From here, invitations to lecture began to approach him. In many of his lectures, he always emphasizes the meaning behind sadaqah by giving examples of his real-life experiences. He also often emphasizes the importance of driving sharia economics through business. The simple style of his lecture makes the contents of the lecture easily digested by the public, thus leading to his popularity. He is now a member of the business network Veretra Sentosa International (VSI). After his success, Yusuf Mansur initiated the establishment of Qur'an Recitation Nursery Program (PPPA) which aimed at the free education for Qur'an memorization, in Pondok Pesantren Daarul Qur'an Ketapang in Cipondoh, Tangerang, Banten.

Although already a national figure well known by the people of Indonesia, Yusuf Mansur is known for paying homage and respect (tawadhu and ta'zhim) toward his teachers in elementary and secondary schools. This can be seen from the way he kisses their hands when he meets them. He also often takes time to stop at madrasah where he was raised by his teachers.
