= Kendal, Kendal =

Place and capital of Kendal Regency, Central Java

Kendal
- Location in Central Java and Indonesia Kendal (Indonesia)
- Coordinates: 6°55′18.1″S 110°12′14.5″E
- Country: Indonesia
- Province: Central Java
- Regency: Kendal Regency
- District: Kota Kendal District
- Elevation: 23 ft (7 m)

Population (mid 2024 estimate)
  - Total: 61,987
- Time zone: UTC+7 (Indonesia Western Standard Time)

Kendal is a town and administrative district (kecamatan), and the regency seat of Kendal Regency, Central Java province, Indonesia. Its population was 61,987 as at mid 2024.

== Climate ==
Kendal has a tropical monsoon climate (Am) with moderate rainfall from June to October and heavy to very heavy rainfall from November to May.

Climate data for Kendal
Month	Jan	Feb	Mar	Apr	May	Jun	Jul	Aug	Sep	Oct	Nov	Dec	Year
Mean daily maximum °C (°F)	30.0 (86.0)	30.1 (86.2)	30.6 (87.1)	31.6 (88.9)	32.1 (89.8)	32.2 (90.0)	32.6 (90.7)	33.0 (91.4)	33.6 (92.5)	33.4 (92.1)	32.2 (90.0)	30.9 (87.6)	31.9 (89.4)
Daily mean °C (°F)	26.0 (78.8)	26.1 (79.0)	26.4 (79.5)	27.1 (80.8)	27.5 (81.5)	26.9 (80.4)	26.8 (80.2)	26.9 (80.4)	27.6 (81.7)	27.8 (82.0)	27.4 (81.3)	26.5 (79.7)	26.9 (80.4)
Mean daily minimum °C (°F)	22.1 (71.8)	22.2 (72.0)	22.3 (72.1)	22.7 (72.9)	22.9 (73.2)	21.7 (71.1)	21.0 (69.8)	20.9 (69.6)	21.6 (70.9)	22.3 (72.1)	22.7 (72.9)	22.2 (72.0)	22.0 (71.7)
Average rainfall mm (inches)	412 (16.2)	304 (12.0)	244 (9.6)	181 (7.1)	141 (5.6)	81 (3.2)	73 (2.9)	43 (1.7)	57 (2.2)	114 (4.5)	192 (7.6)	259 (10.2)	2,101 (82.8)
Source: Climate-Data.org
