= Uus (comedian) =

Indonesian stand-up comedian

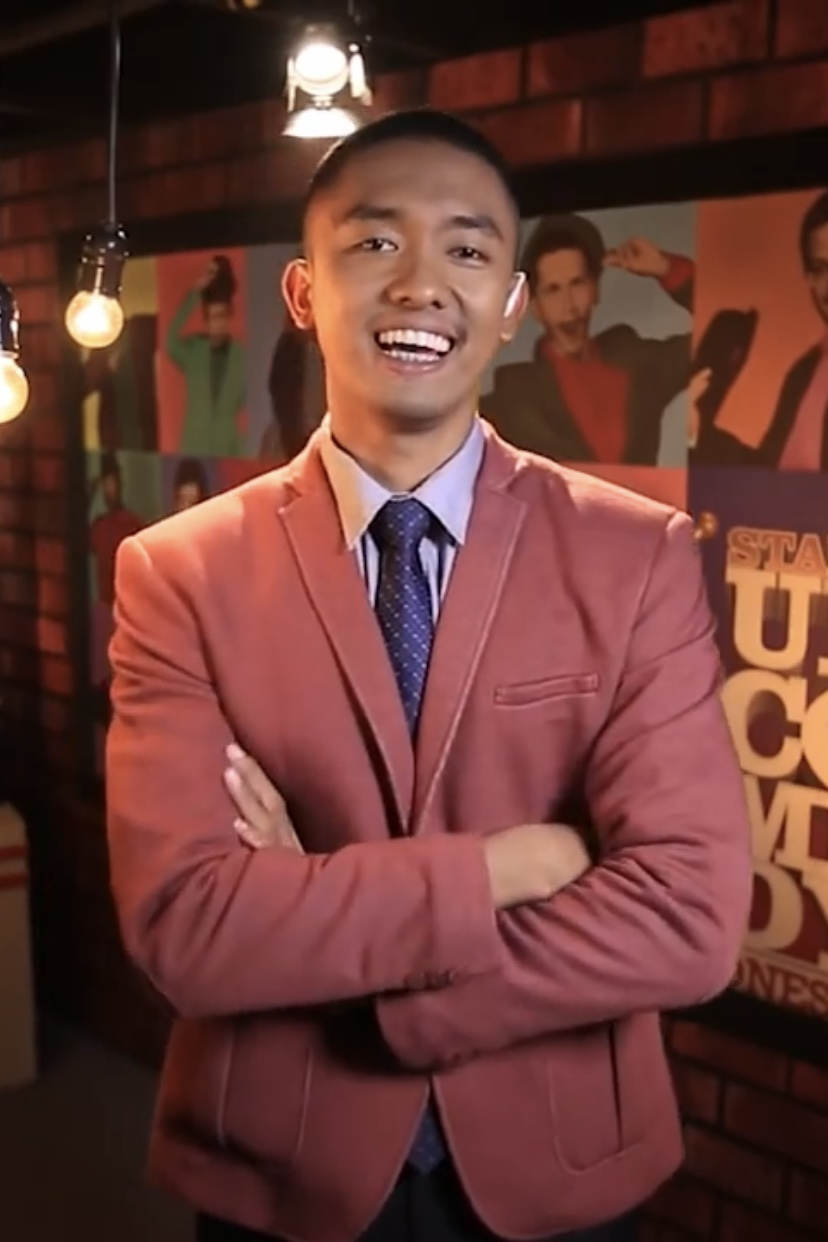
- Uus in 2016
- Born: Rizky Firdaus Wijaksana; 23 December 1990 (age 35); Bandung, West Java, Indonesia
- Other name: Uus
- Education: Padjadjaran University
- Occupations: comedian; Actor; Humorist; Presenter; Professional wrestler
- Years active: 2013–present
- Family: Givina Lukira Dewi (sister)
- Professional wrestling career
- Ring name: Yakuusaha
- Billed height: 6 ft 2 in (188 cm)
- Billed weight: 203 lb (92 kg)
- Billed from: Bandung, West Java
- Debut: 11 February 2024

Rizky Firdaus Wijaksana (born 23 December 1990), better known as Uus, is an Indonesian stand-up comedian, actor and presenter. He is also a founder of the independent wrestling promotion, Kebanting!

== Controversy ==
Uus aroused controversy over his tweets on his Twitter social media account because he insulted a number of K-Pop artists and became the focus of the South Korean media. Apart from that, Uus also received criticism because he was seen as criticizing women who wear the hijab who are too fanatical about K-Pop.

== Filmography ==
=== Film ===
Key
†	Denotes films that have not yet been released

Year	Title	Role	Notes
2014	Malam Minggu Miko Movie	Elementary school tour guide	
2015	This is Cinta	Waiter	
2015	Romeo + Rinjani	Marriage officiant	
2015	Epen Cupen the Movie	Pharmacist	
2015	Comic 8: Casino Kings Part 1	Uus	
2015	Get Married 5: 99% Muhrim	Gymnasium visitor	
2016	Jagoan Instan	Thug boss	
2016	Comic 8: Casino Kings Part 2	Uus	
2016	Abdullah & Takeshi	Senior	
2016	Get Up Stand Up	SUCI event presenter	
2016	Modus	Thug	
2017	Mau Jadi Apa?	Rusli	
2018	Yowis Ben	Bayu High School alumni	
2018	Hongkong Kasarung	Cecep	
2018	Generasi Micin vs Kevin	Tulang Johana	
2019	PSP: Gaya Mahasiswa	Dindin	
2019	Move On Aja	Dani	
2019	Imperfect: Karier, Cinta & Timbangan	Ali	
2020	Bucin	Building security	
2020	Pelukis Hantu	James	
2024	Dealova †		Coach

=== Short film ===
Year	Title	Role	Notes
2021	Bersama Raih Lebih	Brody	

=== Television ===
Year	Title	Role	Notes
2016	3 Sempruuul Mengejar Surga 4	Uus	
2018	Di Sebelah Ada Surga	Uus	
2021	Imperfect the Series	Ali	
2022	Imperfect the Series 2	Ali	Episode 2, 4, and 5
2023	Imperfect the Series 2	Ali	Episode 12, 13, and 16
2024	The One †		

=== Television show ===
- Stand Up Comedy Show (Metro TV)
- Stand Up Comedy Indonesia Kompas TV as participant in 2013, co-presenter in 2014 and 2015, presenter in 2016 and 2021
- SUPER (Kompas TV)
- SUCI Playground (Kompas TV)
- Liga Komunitas Stand Up (Kompas TV)
- Funny Sport (Trans TV)
- Inbox (SCTV)
- Stand Up Comedy Academy (Indosiar) as co-presenter
- La Academia Junior Indonesia (SCTV)
- Gen Z (Trans7)
- Stand Up Comedy Club (Indosiar)
- Indonesia Lawak Klub (Trans7)
- Opera Van Java (Trans7)
- Duel Super (Trans7) as a presenter along with Denny Cagur
- Parade Komika (Indosiar)
- Mabar Yuk! (NET.)

=== Digital program ===
- Comedy Island Indonesia (2023)

=== Music video ===
- Di Atas Normal — Noah (2022)

=== Podcast ===
- Udik
- Boring Bokir
