= Ade Yasin =

Indonesian lawyer and politician

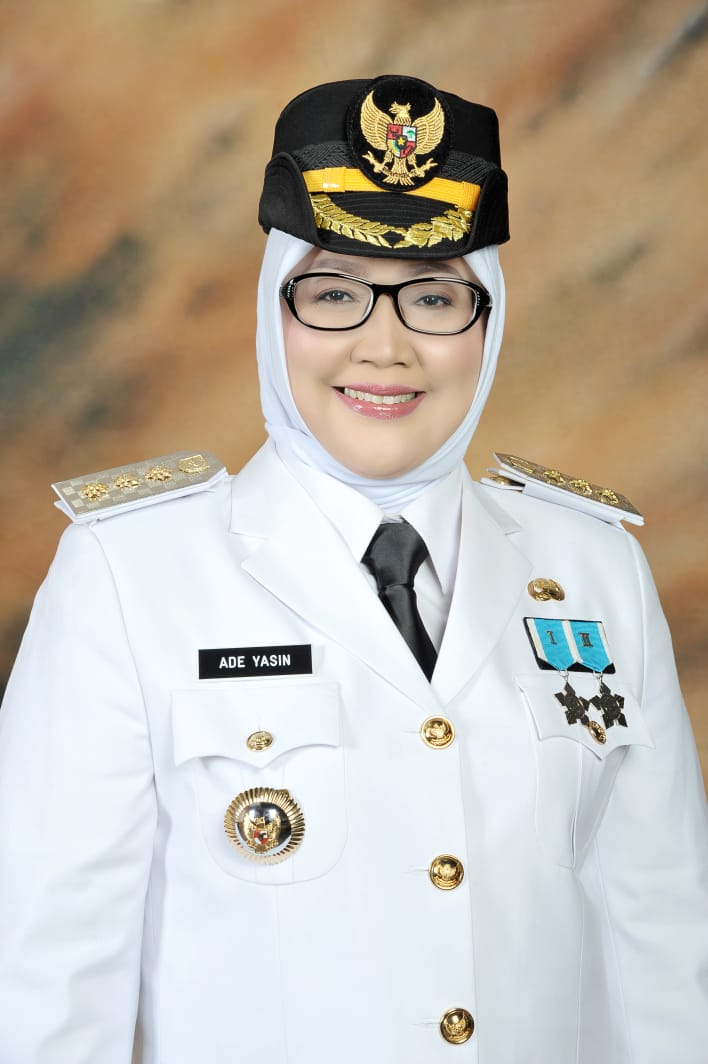
- Official portrait, 2018

Regent of Bogor
- In office 30 December 2018 – 28 April 2022
- Preceded by: Nurhayanti
- Succeeded by: Iwan Setiawan

Member of Bogor Regency DPRD
- In office 27 August 2009 – 2018

Personal details
- Born: 29 May 1968 (age 58) Bogor, West Java, Indonesia
- Party: PPP

Ade Yasin (born 29 May 1968) is an Indonesian lawyer and former politician of the United Development Party who was the regent of Bogor Regency between 2018 and 2022, after previously serving as a municipal legislator between 2009 and 2018. She was arrested by the Corruption Eradication Commission for bribing state auditors in 2022 and was sentenced to four years in prison.

== Early life ==
Ade Yasin was born on 29 May 1968 in Bogor Regency to Yasin and Nuryati. Ade's father was an early founder of the United Development Party (PPP) in Bogor, and had served in the local legislatures of both Bogor Regency and Bogor City. She studied in Bogor, graduating from high school in 1987 and continuing her studies until she received her master's degree from Djuanda University. After graduating, she began to work as a lawyer.

== Career ==
She took part in the 2009 Indonesian legislative election as a PPP member and was elected into the Bogor Regency Regional House of Representatives. She was reelected to a second term in 2014. In 2018, she ran in the regency election and won with 912,221 (41.12%) votes. She was sworn in as regent on 30 December 2018.

As regent, Yasin increased the time allocated to religious studies in Bogor Regency's state-funded schools, receiving an award from the Ministry of Religious Affairs for the policy. She also initiated a rural infrastructure funding program, which in 2021 and 2022 disbursed Rp 400 billion (US$26 million) to Bogor's villages – Rp 1 billion per village annually.

== Arrest and prison ==
On 27 April 2022, Yasin was arrested along with 11 others in an operation by the Corruption Eradication Commission. She was found guilty for bribing auditors from the Audit Board of Indonesia in order to give the regency a pass in their audits. The Bandung District Court sentenced her to four years in prison, and the decision was withheld after two appeals.

== Family ==
Yasin was married to Yanwar Permadi (d.2020), and the couple had three children. Two of Yasin's siblings, Rachmat Yasin and Zaenul Mutaqin, are also United Development Party politicians. Rachmat was regent of Bogor between 2008 and 2014 who had also been arrested by KPK, while Zaenul had contested the mayoral election for Bogor City in 2018 and served in the Bogor City Regional House of Representatives since 2014.
