= Nurhayanti =

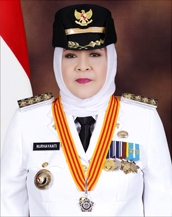

Regent of Bogor
- In office 16 March 2015 – 30 December 2018
- Governor: Ahmad Heryawan; Ridwan Kamil
- Preceded by: Rahmat Yasin
- Succeeded by: Ade Yasin

Vice Regent of Bogor
- In office 30 December 2013 – 16 March 2015
- Regent: Rahmat Yasin
- Preceded by: Karyawan Faturahman
- Succeeded by: Iwan Setiawan

Personal details
- Born: 26 October 1955 (age 69); Bogor Regency, Indonesia

Nurhayanti (born 26 October 1955) is an Indonesian politician who was the regent of Bogor between 2015 and 2018. The first women to lead the regency, she was previously vice regent to Rahmat Yasin before Yasin was arrested in 2014.

== Background ==
Nurhayanti was born in Bogor on 26 October 1955, and completed her elementary and middle school there. She has a MSc from Satyagama University.

== Career ==
Nurhayanti began her career as a public servant in 1984, and has served in multiple positions. Starting as the head of a subsection, she eventually became the head for road management and water resources, before being appointed as head of the municipal revenue body in 2005 and head of the regional supervisory body in 2007.

In the 2013 regency election, Nurhayanti ran as a running mate to incumbent Rahmat Yasin, with the pair winning 64.83 percent (1,225,927 votes). As Yasin was arrested by the Corruption Eradication Commission, Nurhayanti was made the acting regent on 8 December 2014. She was officially sworn in as regent on 16 March 2015 by governor Ahmad Heryawan, making her the first female regent of the regency.

She was named as the Best Female Mayor in Indonesia in 2017 by the Women's Obsession magazine. The magazine cited her policy in enforcing performance targets for civil servants, infrastructure development under her in the regency and her development of traditional markets there.

In the 2018 regency election, she decided against running. She was succeeded by Ade Yasin (Rachmat Yasin's sister), who was sworn in on 30 December 2018.

== Personal life ==
Nurhayanti was married to Diding Darwin Sarmidy until Diding died in December 2017. She has two children and three grandchildren.
