= 2018 Bogor regency election =

Local election in Indonesia

- 27 June 2018
- Turnout: 69.9%
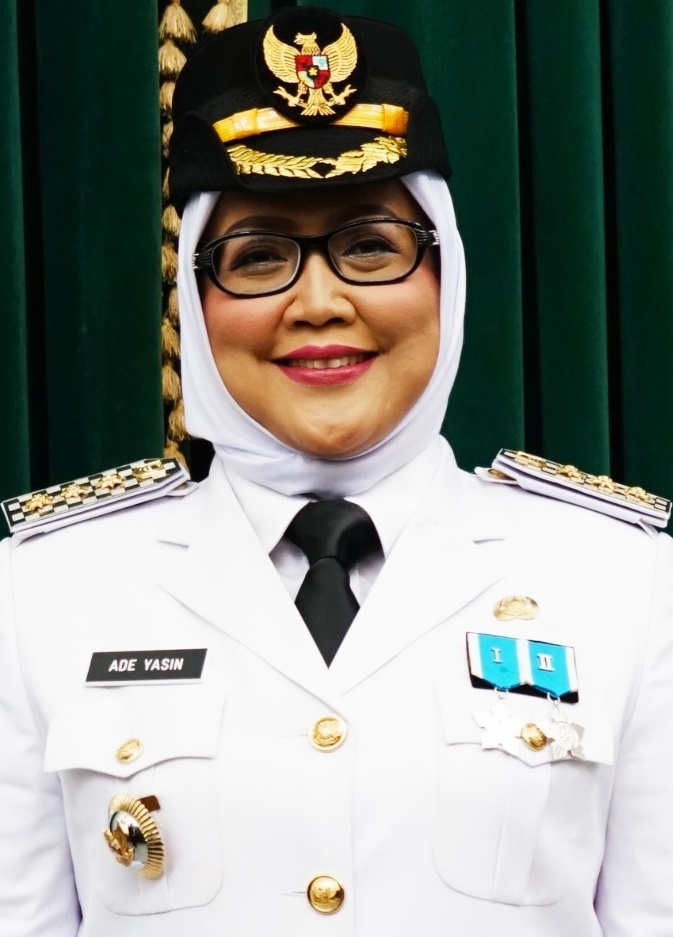

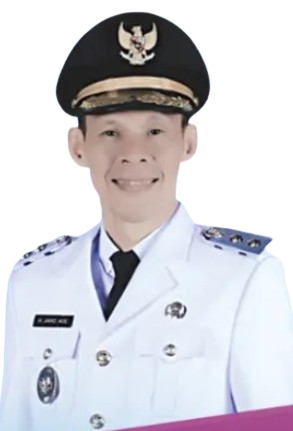
Nominee	Ade Yasin	Ade Ruhandi
Party	PPP	Golkar
Running mate	Iwan Setiawan	Ingrid Kansil
Popular vote	912,221	859,444
Percentage	41.12%	38.74%
Regent before election
Nurhayanti
Elected Regent
Ade Yasin
PPP

The 2018 Bogor regency election was held on June 27, 2018, as part of the simultaneous local elections. It was held to elect the regent and deputy regent of Bogor Regency. Elections for members of the municipal council (Dewan Perwakilan Rakyat Daerah) will be held in 2019.

Incumbent regent, Nurhayanti, while eligible, has decided not to run for re-election. In total, five candidates were on the election ballot: three party candidate pairs and two independent candidate pairs. Municipal councilor and sister of a former regent, Ade Yasin, defeated fellow councilor, Ade Ruhandi, and the other 4 candidates.

== Candidates ==
The candidates, along with their supporting parties, are as follows:

Ballot No.	Candidate	Support
1	Fitri Putra Nugraha/Bayu Syah Johan	Hanura; PDI-P
2	Ade Yasin/Iwan Setiawan	PPP; PKB; Gerindra
3	Ade Ruhandi/Ingrid Kansil	Golkar; Nasdem; PKS; PAN; Demokrat; PKPI; PBB
4	Gunawan Hasan/Fikry Zulfikar Irama	Independent
5	Ade Wardhana Adinata/Asep Ruhiyat	Independent

== Results ==
No	Candidate	Votes	%
1	Fitri Putra Nugraha/Bayu Syah Johan	177,153	7.99
2	Ade Yasin/Iwan Setiawan	912,221	41.12
3	Ade Ruhandi/Ingrid Kansil	859,444	38.74
4	Gunawan Hasan/Fikry Zulfikar Irama	100,745	4.54
5	Ade Wardhana Adinata/Asep Ruhiyat	168,733	7.61
Total votes		2,218,296	
Invalid votes		140,268	
Total turnout		2,358,564	69.89
Eligible voters		3,374,610	100

The results were announced on July 6, 2018. The winner, Ade Yasin, is a former municipal councilor for the regency and is the chairman for West Java's branch of the United Development Party.

== Aftermath ==
Following the announcement, the Ade Ruhandi/Inggrid Kansil pair filed a lawsuit to the Constitutional Court of Indonesia. Although the lawsuit was eventually turned down, it resulted in a delay for the swearing in of the regent-elect, which was moved to March 2019.
