= Tasiman =

Indonesian politician (died 2020)

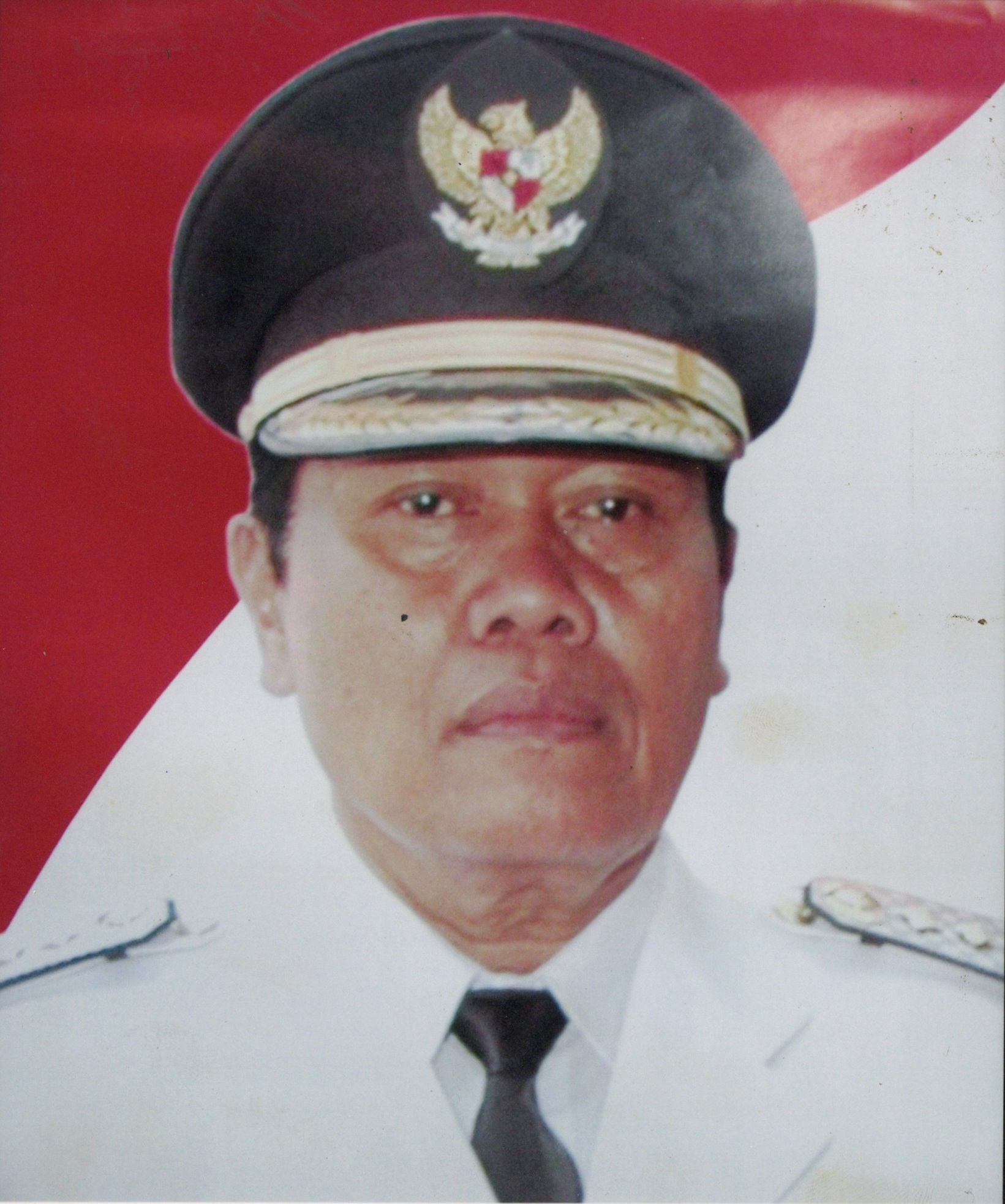

Regent of Pati Regency
- In office 2001–2011
- Governor: Mardiyanto; Ali Mufiz; Bibit Waluyo
- Preceded by: ?
- Succeeded by: Haryanto

Personal details
- Died: 7 December 2020 Pati, Central Java, Indonesia

Tasiman (died 7 December 2020) was an Indonesian politician.

== Biography ==
He served as the Regent of Pati Regency, in Central Java province, for two consecutive terms from 2001 to 2011.

Tasiman, who also suffered from diabetes, died from complications of COVID-19 at RAA Soewondo Pati Hospital in Pati city on 7 December 2020, during the COVID-19 pandemic in Indonesia. He is buried in Juwana, Pati Regency.
