= Governor of Central Java =

- Flag of Central Java

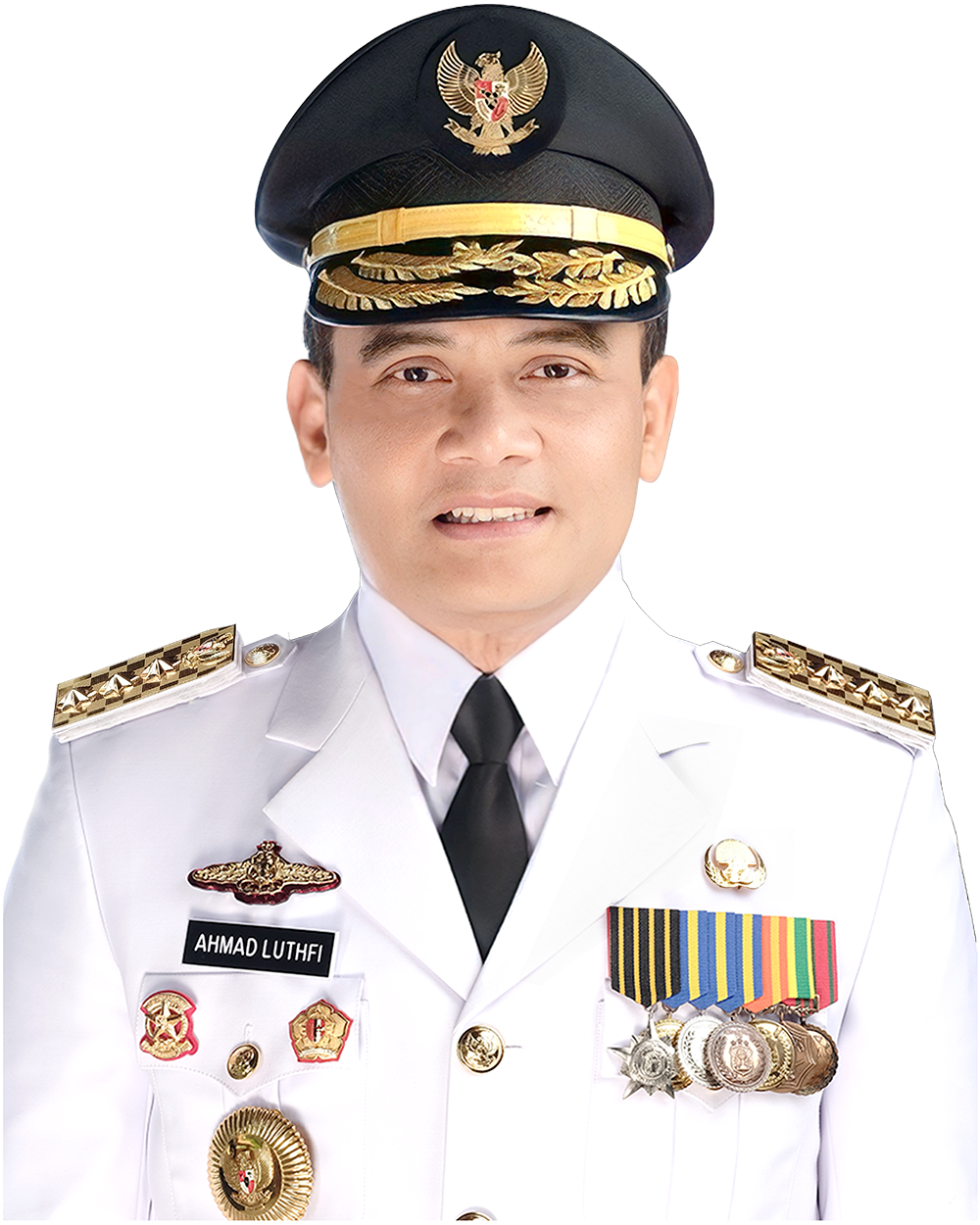
- Incumbent; Ahmad Luthfi since 20 February 2025
- Central Java Provincial Government
- Style: Mr. Governor (informal); The Honorable (formal); His Excellency (diplomatic)
- Type: Chief executive
- Status: Head of government
- Abbreviation: GOCJ (in English); Gub. Jateng (in Indonesian)
- Residence: Wisma Perdamaian (Official); Puri Gedeh (other)
- Seat: Semarang
- Nominator: Political parties or Independent
- Appointer: Direct popular elections within Central Java (Note: since 2008, previously via Central Java Regional House of Representatives) or President
- Term length: Five years, renewable once 1 years (specifically for the acting governor)
- Inaugural holder: Raden Panji Soeroso
- Formation: 18 August 1945
- Deputy: Vice Governor of Central Java
- Website: www.jatengprov.go.id

The Governor of Central Java (Indonesian: Gubernur Jawa Tengah) is the first-level regional head in Central Java along with the Deputy Governor and 120 members of the Central Java Regional House of Representatives. The Governor and Deputy Governor of Central Java are elected through general elections which are held every 5 years. The current governor of Central Java is Ahmad Luthfi.

== List of governors ==
The following is a list of governors of Central Java:

#	Portrait	Governor	Period		Party	Deputy governor	Term	Notes
Governor of Central Java
1		Soeroso	18 August 1945	13 October 1945	Non-party	N/A	1	(Note: Noble title Raden Panji)
2		Wongsonegoro	13 October 1945	13 October 1949	Great Indonesia Party	N/A	2	(Note: Noble title Kanjeng Raden Mas Tumenggung)
3		Boedijono	13 October 1949	1954		N/A	3	(Note: Noble tile Raden)
4		Mangun Negoro	1954	1958		N/A	4	(Note: Noble title Mas Raden Tumenggung)
5		Sukardji Mangun Kusumo	1958	1958		N/A	5	(Note: Noble title Raden Mas Tumenggung)
6		Hadisubeno Sosrowerdojo	1958	1960	Partai Nasional Indonesia	N/A	6	(Note: Noble title Raden Mas)
7		Mochtar	1960	1966	Partai Nasional Indonesia	N/A	7	
8		Moenadi	1966	1974	Military	N/A	8	
9		Soepardjo Rustam	1974	19 March 1983	Military	N/A	9	(Note: Appointed as Ministry of Home Affairs by President Soeharto)
10		Muhammad Ismail	19 March 1983	1988	Military	N/A	10	
10		Muhammad Ismail	1988	1993	Military	N/A	11	
11		Soewardi	1993	24 August 1998	Military	Sunartejo (1990–1994)	12	(Note: Noble title Raden Mas)
11		Soewardi	1993	24 August 1998	Military	Susmono Martosiswojo (1994–1998)	12	(Note: Noble title Raden Mas)
12		Mardiyanto	24 August 1998	24 August 2003	Military	Susmono Martosiswojo (1994–1998)	13	
12		Mardiyanto	24 August 1998	24 August 2003	Military	• Achmad (1998–2003) • Djoko Sudantoko (1998–2003) • Mulyadi Widodo (1998–2003)	13	
12		Mardiyanto	24 August 2003	28 September 2007	Non-party	Ali Mufiz	14 (2003)	(Note: Resign after appointed as Ministry of Home Affairs by President Susilo Bambang Yudhoyono)
–		Ali Mufiz	29 August 2007	28 September 2007	United Development Party	Vacant	14 (2003)	(Note: Acting Governor)
13		Ali Mufiz	28 September 2007	23 August 2008	United Development Party	Vacant	14 (2003)	
14		Bibit Waluyo	23 August 2008	23 August 2013	Indonesian Democratic Party of Struggle	Rustriningsih	16 (2008)	
15		Ganjar Pranowo	23 August 2013	23 August 2018	Indonesian Democratic Party of Struggle	Heru Sudjatmoko	17 (2013)	
15		Ganjar Pranowo	5 September 2018	5 September 2023	Indonesian Democratic Party of Struggle	Taj Yasin Maimoen	18 (2018)	
16		Ahmad Luthfi	20 February 2025	incumbent	Gerindra Party	Taj Yasin Maimoen	19 (2024)	
