= 2024 Central Java gubernatorial election =

- 27 November 2024
- Registered: 28,427,616
- Turnout: 73.13% (▲5.49pp)
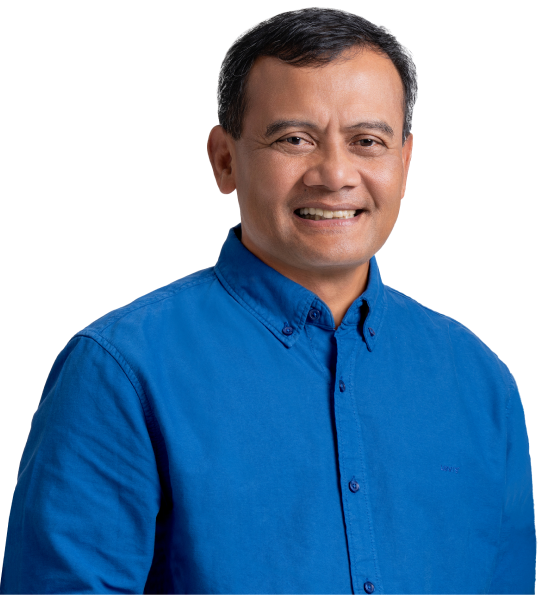

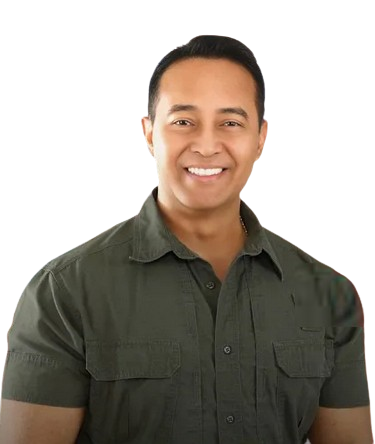
Candidate	Ahmad Luthfi	Andika Perkasa
Party	Gerindra	PDI-P
Alliance	KIM Plus	–
Running mate	Taj Yasin Maimoen	Hendrar Prihadi
Popular vote	11,390,191	7,870,084
Percentage	59.14%	40.86%
- Results map by district
Governor before election
Nana Sudjana (acting)
Independent
Elected Governor
Ahmad Luthfi
Gerindra

The 2024 Central Java gubernatorial election was held on 27 November 2024 as part of nationwide local elections to elect the governor and vice governor of Central Java for a five-year term. The election was contested by former Commander of the Indonesian National Armed Forces Andika Perkasa, primarily backed by the Indonesian Democratic Party of Struggle (PDI-P), and former provincial chief of police Ahmad Luthfi, backed by a wide coalition of parties led by Luthfi's Gerindra Party. Luthfi won the election with 59% of the vote, defeating Perkasa, who received 40%.

== Electoral system ==
The election, like other local elections in 2024, follow the first-past-the-post system where the candidate with the most votes wins the election, even if they do not win a majority. It is possible for a candidate to run uncontested, in which case the candidate is still required to win a majority of votes "against" an "empty box" option. Should the candidate fail to do so, the election will be repeated on a later date.

== Candidates ==
According to electoral regulations, in order to qualify for the election, candidates were required to secure support from 24 seats in the Central Java Regional House of Representatives (DPRD). The Indonesian Democratic Party of Struggle, with 33 seats, is the only political party eligible to nominate a candidate without forming a coalition. However, following a Constitutional Court of Indonesia decision in August 2024, the political support required to nominate a candidate was lowered to between 6.5 and 10 percent of the popular vote. Candidates may alternatively demonstrate support in form of photocopies of identity cards, which in Central Java's case corresponds to 1.84 million copies. No independent candidates registered with the General Elections Commission for the gubernatorial election.

The previous governor, Ganjar Pranowo, had served two full terms and was therefore ineligible to contest the election.

=== Declared ===
The following candidates qualified to contest the election:

1
Candidate from PDIP
Andika Perkasa	Hendrar Prihadi
for Governor	for Vice Governor
Commander of the Indonesian National Armed Forces (2021–2022)	Head of the Government Goods/Services Procurement Policy Institute of the Republic of Indonesia (LKPP) (2022–present); Mayor of Semarang (2013–2022)
Parties
33 / 120 (28%) PDIP (33 seats)

On 26 August, the third declaration candidates of PDI-P officially announced Andika Perkasa and Hendrar Prihadi running as governor and vice governor.

2
Candidate from Gerindra and Independent
Ahmad Luthfi	Taj Yasin Maimoen
for Governor	for Vice Governor
	Border
Inspector General of the Ministry of Trade (2024–present); Head of Central Java Police (2020–2024)	Vice Governor of Central Java (2018–2023)
Parties
51 / 120 (43%) Golkar (17 seats); Gerindra (17 seats); PKS (11 seats); PAN (4 seats); PSI (2 seats)

The chief of the provincial police, Ahmad Luthfi, declared his willingness to run as a gubernatorial candidate in late June 2024. By 25 July 2024, four political parties: Golkar, Gerindra, PAN, and PSI, had announced their endorsement of Luthfi. He was assigned as Inspector General in the Ministry of Trade in late July 2024, after receiving the endorsements.

=== Potential ===
The following p individuals were either publicly mentioned as potential candidates, or considered as such by the press:

- Bambang Wuryanto (PDI-P), member of the House of Representatives from Central Java IV district (Karanganyar, Wonogiri, and Sragen).
- Hendrar Prihadi (PDI-P), Mayor of Semarang (2013-2022).
- Andika Perkasa (PDI-P), former Commander of the Indonesian National Armed Forces (2021-2022).
- Taj Yasin Maimoen (PPP), former vice governor (2018-2023).
- Yusuf Chudlori (PKB), chairman of PKB's Central Java branch.

=== Declined ===
The following individuals were mentioned as potential candidates, but ultimately declined to run:

- Dico Ganinduto (Golkar), Regent of Kendal.
- Gibran Rakabuming Raka, Mayor of Surakarta (2021-2024). (ran for Vice President)
- Kaesang Pangarep (PSI), chairman of the Indonesian Solidarity Party and son of former President Joko Widodo.
- Sudaryono (Gerindra), chairman of Gerindra's Central Java branch.

== Political map ==
Following the 2024 Indonesian general election, ten political parties are represented in the Central Java Regional House of Representatives:

Political parties	Seat count
Indonesian Democratic Party of Struggle (PDI-P)	33 / 120
National Awakening Party (PKB)	20 / 120
Party of Functional Groups (Golkar)	17 / 120
Great Indonesia Movement Party (Gerindra)	17 / 120
Prosperous Justice Party (PKS)	11 / 120
Democratic Party (Demokrat)	7 / 120
United Development Party (PPP)	6 / 120
National Mandate Party (PAN)	4 / 120
NasDem Party	3 / 120
Indonesian Solidarity Party (PSI)	2 / 120

== Opinion polls ==
=== Pre-election polls ===
Poll source	Date	Sample size									Others	Lead	Error margin
Poll source	Date	Sample size	Kaesang Pangarep	Ahmad Luthfi	Sudaryono	Bambang Pacul	Hendrar Prihadi	Dico Ganinduto	Taj Yasin Maimoen	Ganjar Pranowo	Others	Lead	Error margin
Lembaga Survei Indonesia	21 - 26 June 2024	1,200	2.5%	5.2%	2.1%	1.8%	-	1.7%	1.5%	1.0%	2.5%	2.7%	+/- 2.8%
Lembaga Survei Indonesia	21 - 26 June 2024	1,200	15.9%	12.9%	4.7%	5.8%	4.7%	3.5%	2.7%	-	18.0%	3.0%	+/- 2.8%
Lembaga Survei Indonesia	21 - 26 June 2024	1,200	25.6%	16.1%	6.0%	9.7%	-	-	13.4%	-	6.2%	9.5%	+/- 2.8%
Parameter Politik Indonesia	15 - 21 May 2024	800	2.3%	1.8%	-	2.0%	7.7%	7.1%	10.9%	1.4%	9.4%	2.7%	3.5%

== Results ==
Candidate	Running mate	Party	Votes	%
Ahmad Luthfi	Taj Yasin Maimoen	Gerindra Party	11,390,191	59.14
Andika Perkasa	Hendrar Prihadi	Indonesian Democratic Party of Struggle	7,870,084	40.86
Total			19,260,275	100.00
Valid votes			19,260,275	92.65
Invalid/blank votes			1,528,502	7.35
Total votes			20,788,777	100.00
Registered voters/turnout			28,427,616	73.13
Source: KPU Jawa Tengah
