= Hadi Prabowo =

Indonesian politician

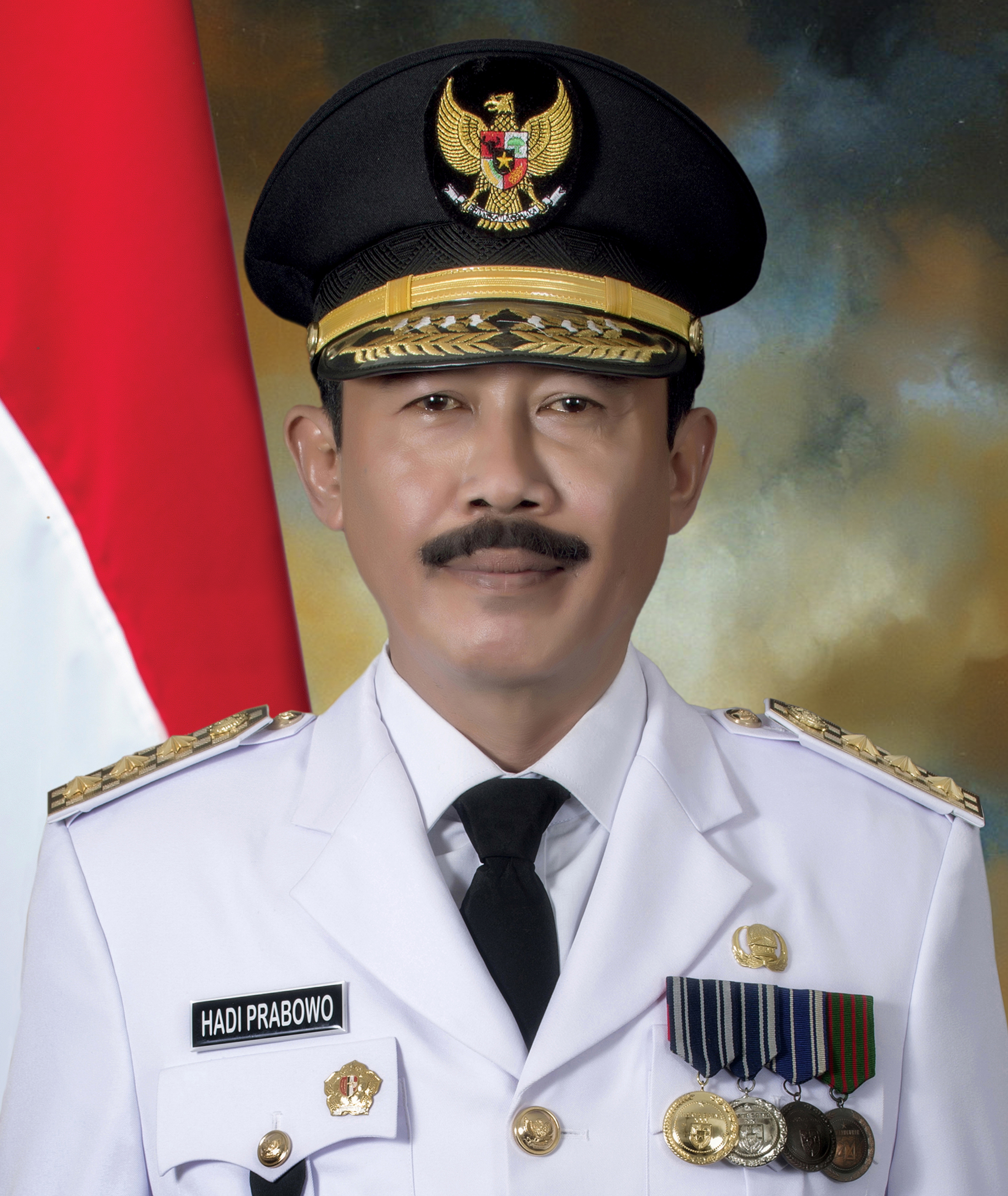

Chancellor of the Institute of Home Affairs
- Incumbent
- Assumed office 20 March 2020
- Preceded by: Murtir Jeddawi

Governor of South Sumatra acting
- In office 21 September 2018 – 1 October 2018
- President: Joko Widodo
- Preceded by: Alex Noerdin
- Succeeded by: Herman Deru

Governor of Central Kalimantan acting
- In office 5 August 2015 – 25 May 2016
- President: Joko Widodo
- Preceded by: Agustin Teras Narang
- Succeeded by: Sugianto Sabran

Personal details
- Born: 3 April 1960 (age 66) Klaten, Central Java, Indonesia
- Education: Diponegoro University; Islamic University of Indonesia
- Occupation: Government employee

Hadi Prabowo, better known by his initials HP (born 3 April 1960) is an Indonesian politician and government employee, who is serving as the current Chancellor of the Institute for Home Affairs since 2020. Previously, he served as Secretary General of the Ministry of Home Affairs. In the 2013 Central Java gubernatorial election, Hadi ran as a candidate for governor who was promoted by a coalition of parties including the PKS, Gerindra, PKB, PPP, Hanura, and PKNU, and was paired with Don Murdono, the regent of Sumedang. However he lost the election, coming in third, behind Ganjar Pranowo and the then incumbent governor Bibit Waluyo.
