= Soewardi (governor) =

Indonesian politician

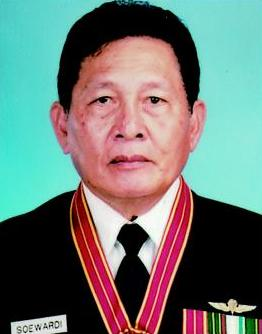
- Electoral portrait, 2004

Governor of Central Java
- In office 24 August 1993 – 24 August 1998
- Preceded by: Muhammad Ismail
- Succeeded by: Mardiyanto

Personal details
- Born: 13 April 1938; Singaraja, Dutch East Indies
- Died: 31 March 2015 (aged 76); Semarang, Indonesia

Military service
- Allegiance: Indonesia
- Branch/service: Indonesian Army
- Rank: Major general

Soewardi (13 April 1938 – 31 March 2015) was an Indonesian military officer and politician who served as the Governor of Central Java between 1993 and 1998. He served in the Indonesian Army and was commanders of the Sriwijaya and Udayana Military Regions prior to his tenure as governor.

== Early life ==
Soewardi was born in Singaraja, on the island of Bali, on 13 April 1938. Both of his parents originated from Central Java, but as his father worked as a police officer, Soewardi was born during his father's posting in Bali. He studied in Yogyakarta until he graduated from high school. After high school, he enrolled at the Indonesian Military Academy within its infantry department and graduated in 1962.

== Career ==
As a brigadier general, he was appointed to become commander of the Sriwijaya Military Region on 14 March 1989, after previously serving as the unit's chief of staff. On 7 August 1992, he was reassigned to become the commander of the Udayana Military Region. By this time, he had been promoted to major general.

He was sworn in as governor of Central Java on 24 August 1993. In July 1996, Soewardi ordered the postponement of all village-level elections in the province until after the 1997 legislative election. Two weeks after the fall of Suharto, on 4 June 1998, he ordered another delay, partly due to political violence.

During the leadup to the 1997 election, Soewardi ordered government buildings, public areas, and a number of trees to be painted yellow – the color of the ruling party Golkar. Indonesian media dubbed this action kuningisasi ('yellowization'). Soewardi later stated that he had only recommended the general public to paint their homes yellow to commemorate the 50th year of Indonesia's independence. In 1997, he suggested that the Yogyakarta Special Region be absorbed into Central Java. This proposal was opposed by Yogyakarta's Sultan Hamengkubuwono X and Yogyakarta's public, resulting in a lawsuit. Soewardi's tenure ended on 24 August 1998 and he was replaced by Mardiyanto.

== Later life ==
After his tenure, Soewardi was investigated for corruption, but charges were dropped in 2003. He died at his home in Semarang on 31 March 2015. He was buried the following day at his family's cemetery in Magelang.

== Personal life ==
Soewardi was married to Yani Soewardi, and the couple had three children. Their second child, Ronny Adriono, was a captain in the Indonesian Army and was killed in a 2004 plane crash.
