= Ali Mufiz =

Indonesian politician

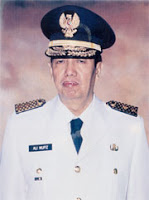
- Mufiz as Vice Governor, 2007

Governor of Central Java
- In office 28 September 2007^{[a]} – 23 August 2008
- Preceded by: Mardiyanto
- Succeeded by: Bibit Waluyo

Vice Governor of Central Java
- In office 24 August 2003 – 29 August 2007
- Governor: Mardiyanto
- Succeeded by: Rustriningsih

Personal details
- Born: 21 July 1944 (age 81) Jepara, Dutch East Indies
- a. Acting from 29 August 2007

Ali Mufiz (born 21 July 1944) is an Indonesian academician and politician who served as the governor of Central Java between September 2007 and August 2008. Prior to becoming governor, he had served for four years as vice governor under Mardiyanto between 2003 and 2007.

== Early life and academia ==
Mufiz was born in Jepara on 21 July 1944. He worked as a journalist in his youth, becoming a journalist for the Nahdlatul Ulama (NU) affiliated Duta Masyarakat daily newspaper in 1966. He worked there until 1969, when he moved to become a secretary for the editor of the Dinamika Baru weekly in Semarang. He later studied at Diponegoro University, graduating in 1971 and later becoming a lecturer at the university starting in 1975. He was appointed head of program for public administration in 1984, and held the position until 1993. He also obtained a masters in public administration from the University of Southern California in 1987.

He later became deputy chairman of NU's provincial branch in Central Java.

== Political career ==
In 1997, Mufiz had run as a legislative candidate under the Golkar party. Mufiz was selected as the running mate to PDI-P's Mardiyanto in Central Java's 2003 gubernatorial election against Mardijo, another PDI-P politician. Mardiyanto and Mufiz secured the support of the National Awakening Party (PKB), and won the election with 62 out of 99 councillor votes despite the split within PDI-P. In 2007, Mardiyanto was appointed by president Susilo Bambang Yudhoyono as Minister of Home Affairs, and was thus removed from gubernatorial post with Mufiz succeeding him. Mufiz was officially sworn in as governor on 28 September 2007 by Mardiyanto.

In 2008, he attempted to run for governor, but failed to secure the political support of PDI-P or PKB, and thus he did not run in the election. His tenure ended on 23 August 2008, and he was replaced by Bibit Waluyo.

After the end of his gubernatorial tenure, Mufiz joined Susilo Bambang Yudhoyono's reelection campaign for the 2009 Indonesian presidential election, and was appointed as head of Central Java team. In the 2013 Central Java gubernatorial election, Waluyo's reelection campaign named Mufiz as an advisor to the campaign team, but Mufiz instead endorsed Ganjar Pranowo, stating that he had been named an advisor without consulting him. He also became head of the advisory committee of Central Java's branch of the Indonesian Ulema Council.

== Personal life ==
Mufiz is married to Zaimatum Azam, and the couple had at least two children. Mufiz' second child died in 2007 due to an illness.
