= 2018 Central Java gubernatorial election =

← 2013	27 June 2018	2024 →
- Registered: 27,216,491
- Turnout: 67.64% (▲11.91 pp)
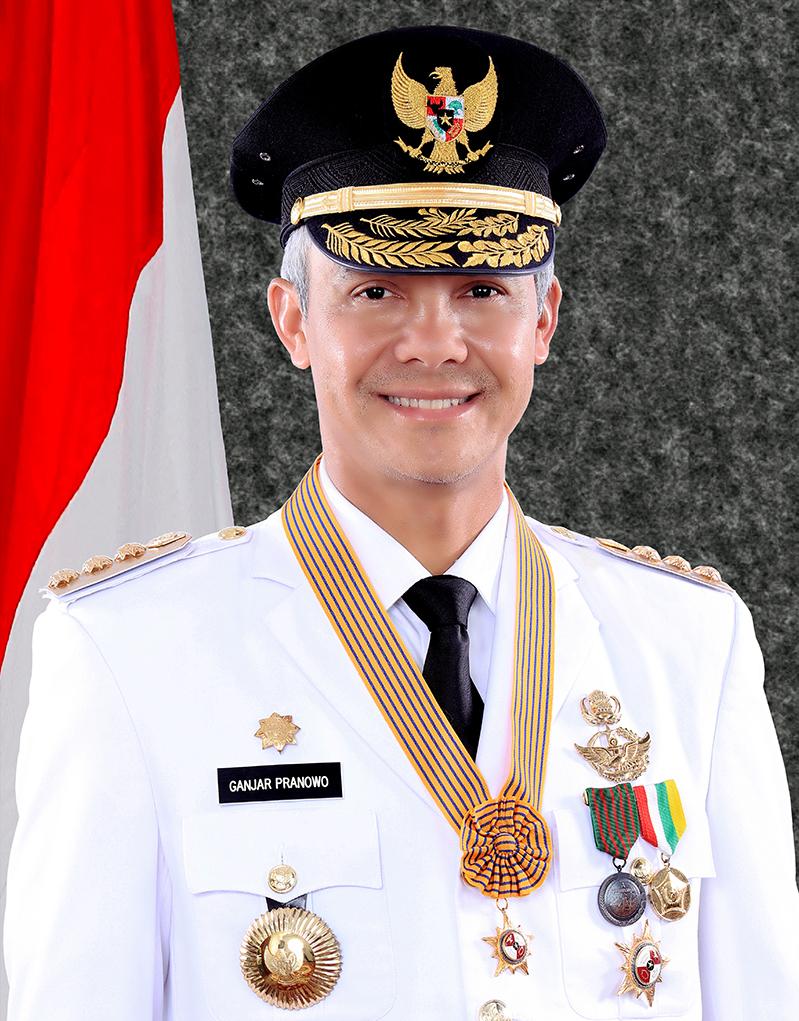

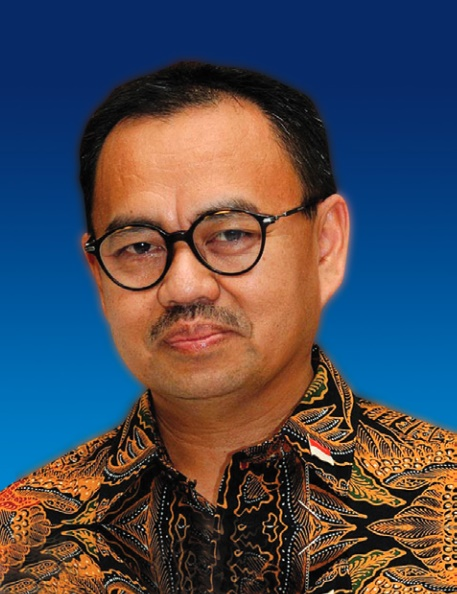
Candidate	Ganjar Pranowo	Sudirman Said
Party	PDI-P	Gerindra
Running mate	Taj Yasin Maimoen	Ida Fauziyah
Popular vote	10,362,694	7,267,993
Percentage	58.78%	41.22%
Governor before election
Ganjar Pranowo
PDI-P
Elected Governor
Ganjar Pranowo
PDI-P

The 2018 Central Java gubernatorial election was held on 27 June 2018 to elect both the governor and vice governor of Central Java. The election, which took place alongside local elections across Indonesia, saw the re-election of the incumbent, Ganjar Pranowo, over former Minister of Energy and Mineral Resources Sudirman Said.

== Timeline ==
On September 10, the General Elections Commission declared a voter count of 27,409,316 in the province. Voting will be done in 64,171 polling stations across the province.

Registration for party-backed candidates were opened between 8 and 10 January 2018, while independent candidates were required to register between 22 and 26 November 2017. The campaigning period would commence between 15 February and 24 June, with a three-day election silence before voting on 27 June.

== Candidates ==
Under regulations, candidates are required to secure the support of a political party or a coalition thereof comprising at least 20 seats in the regional house. Alternatively, independent candidates may run provided they are capable of securing support from 6.5 percent of the total voter population (1,781,606) in form of photocopied ID cards subject to verification by the local committee although no candidates expressing interest managed to do this.

#	Candidate	Most recent position	Running mate	Parties
1	Ganjar Pranowo	Governor of Central Java (2013-2023)	Taj Yasin Maimoen	PDI-P (27 seats); Golkar Party (10 seats); Demokrat (9 seats); PPP (8 seats); Nasdem (4 seats) Total 58 seats
2	Sudirman Said	Minister of Energy and Mineral Resources (2014-2016)	Ida Fauziyah	PKB (13 seats); Gerindra (11 seats); PKS (10 seats); PAN (8 seats) Total 42 seats

Incumbent Ganjar Pranowo, who had run with PDI-P in the 2013 elections, once again did so and the party declared him as the candidate on 7 January 2018. His deputy and old running mate Heru Sudjatmoko (id) also expressed an intention to run and the pair collected KPU's registration form together. However, on the candidate declaration Megawati Soekarnoputri declared Taj Yasin Maimoen from PPP, son of senior politician and ulema Maimun Zubair (id). According to 67-year old Heru, he had accepted the party's decision and plans to retire soon. PPP, which had earlier submitted possible running mates for Ganjar, officially backed the pair on 9 January. Nasdem and Demokrat submitted their support on the same day, while Golkar did so on 10 January.

The coalition of Gerindra, PKS and PAN declared Sudirman Said, Minister of Energy and Mineral Resources between 2014-2016, as their gubernatorial candidate on 27 December 2017. A non-official faction of PPP, headed by Djan Faridz, also expressed its support for Said. PKB, which initially supported Ganjar, threw its weight behind Said and placed their cadre Ida Fauziyah as his running mate. Ida is a member of the People's Representative Council, where she serves as speaker of her party's faction.

== Opinion polls ==
=== After formal nominations ===
Pollster	Date	Sample size	Ganjar Pranowo	Sudirman Said
Indo Barometer	7-13 June 2018	800	67.3	21.1
Charta Politika	23-29 May 2018	1,200	70.5	13.6
Litbang Kompas	10-15 May 2018	800	76.6	15.0
NCID	4-10 May 2018	1,200	44.2	46.1
LSKP-LSI	3-10 April 2018	600	50.3	10.5
Indikator	12-21 March 2018	820	72.4	21.0
Litbang Kompas	19 February-4 March 2018	800	79.0	11.8

=== Before nominations ===
Pollster	Date	Sample size	Results
Lingkaran Survei Indonesia	7-14 November 2017	440	Ganjar (50.9%), Ki Enthus Susmono (7.0%), Musthofa (4.9%), Budi Waseso (4.9%)
LKPI	13-23 September 2017	1,420	Ganjar (18.6%), FJ (16.9%), Musthofa (10.3%), Hendrar Prihadi (10.6%)
Indonesia Development Monitoring	2-9 August 2017	1,668	Ganjar (21.3%), Ferry Juliantono (19.7%), Musthofa (19.6%), Marwan Jafar (8.3%), Yoyok (7.2%), Sudirman Said (4.2%)
Populi Center	15-23 May 2017	800	Ganjar Pranowo (51.6%), Yoyok Riyo Sudibyo (4.0%), Yusuf Khudori (2.9%)

== Results ==
=== Quick count ===
Pollster	Ganjar-Maimoen	Sudirman-Ida
Indo Barometer	56.74	43.26
Litbang Kompas	58.34	41.66
SMRC	58.58	41.42

=== Real Count ===
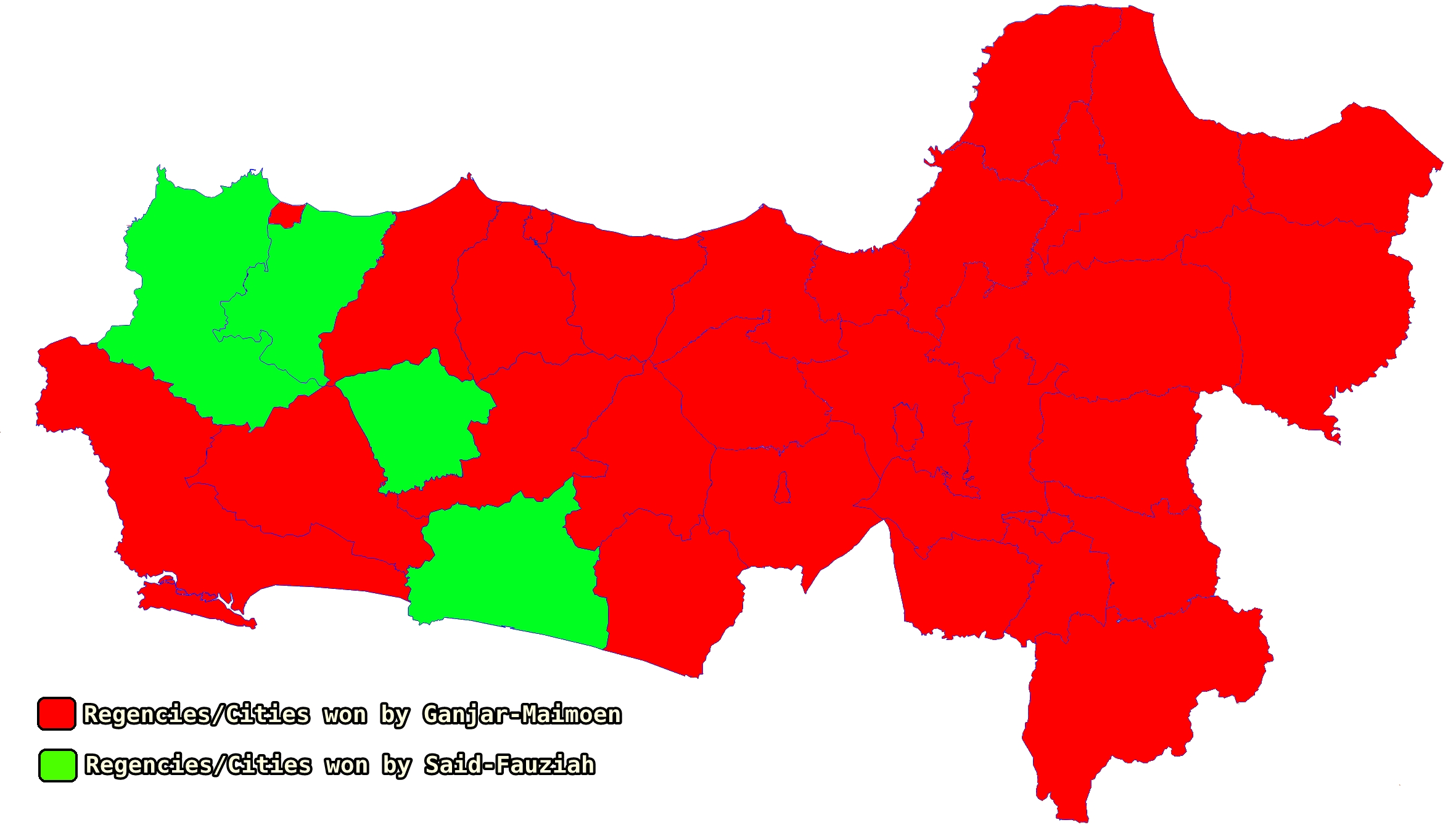

Candidate	Running mate	Party	Votes	%
Ganjar Pranowo	Taj Yasin Maimoen	PDI-P	10,362,694	58.78
Sudirman Said	Ida Fauziyah	Gerindra	7,267,993	41.22
Total			17,630,687	100.00
Valid votes			17,630,687	95.77
Invalid/blank votes			778,805	4.23
Total votes			18,409,492	100.00
Registered voters/turnout			27,216,491	67.64
Source: KPU

== See also ==
- Politics of Indonesia
