= 2013 Central Java gubernatorial election =

← 2008	26 May 2013	2018 →
- Turnout: 55.73%
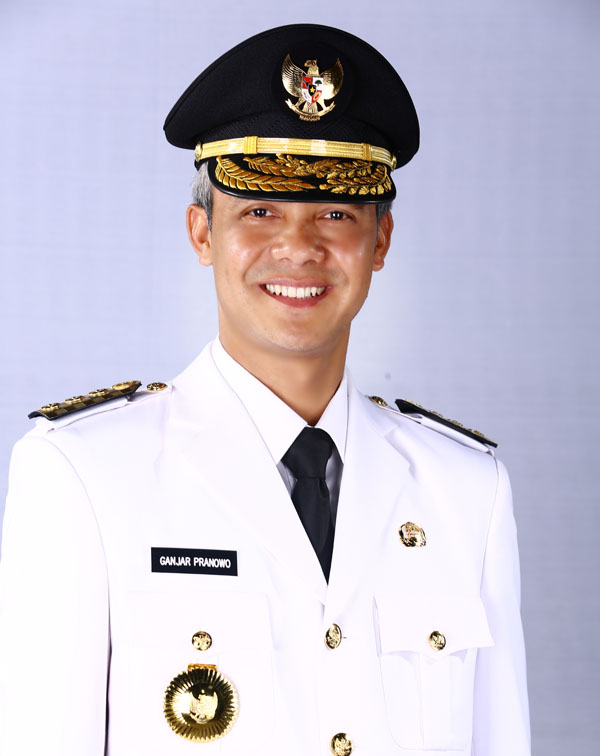

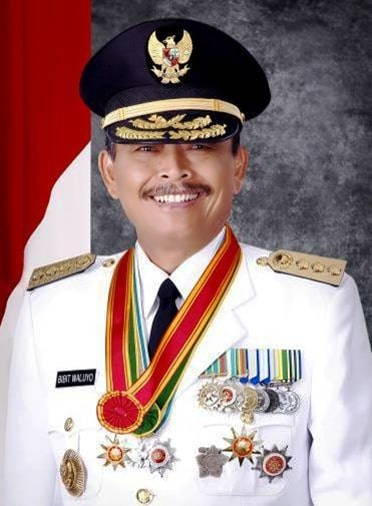

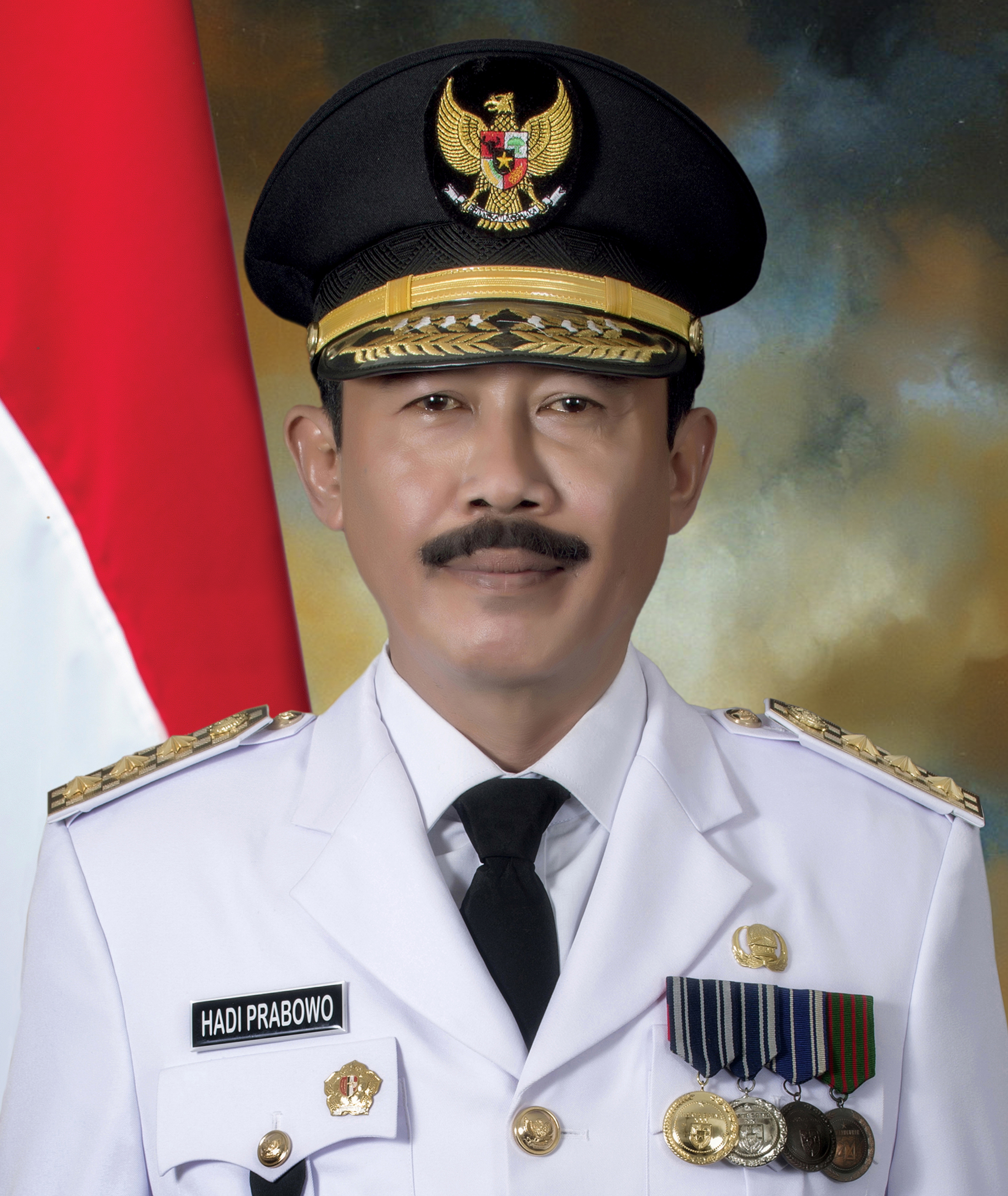
Candidate	Ganjar Pranowo	Bibit Waluyo	Hadi Prabowo
Party	PDI-P	Demokrat	PKS
Running mate	Heru Sudjatmoko	Sudijono Sastroatmodjo	Don Murdono
Popular vote	6,962,417	4,314,813	2,982,715
Percentage	48.82%	30.26%	20.92%
- Location of Central Java within Indonesia
Governor before election
Bibit Waluyo
Demokrat
Elected Governor
Ganjar Pranowo
PDI-P

The 2013 Central Java gubernatorial election was held on 26 May 2013 to elect both the governor and vice governor of Central Java. The incumbent, Bibit Waluyo, ran for re-election as a member of the Democratic Party, despite being first elected as a member of the Indonesian Democratic Party of Struggle (PDI-P) in 2008. In the election, he faced Ganjar Pranowo of the PDI-P and Hadi Prabowo of the Prosperous Justice Party (PKS), being defeated by the former.

== Candidates ==
This general election was contested by three candidates. Incumbent, Bibit Waluyo, ran for re-election with Sudijono, the Chancellor of the State University of Semarang. The PDI-P (who had supported Waluyo in the 2008 election), brought Ganjar Pranowo, a member of the People's Representative Council as a candidate, together with Heru Sudjatmoko who was serving as the Regent of Purbalingga. Interestingly, the deputy governor of Central Java, Rustriningsih which had been predicted to be promoted by the PDI-P, was not nominated. According to some the PDI-P considered that Rustri was not polite in politics. Meanwhile Hadi Prabowo, the Regional Secretary of Central Java ran with the Regent of Sumedang, Don Murdono.

== Results ==
Candidate	Running mate	Party	Votes	%
Ganjar Pranowo	Heru Sudjatmoko	PDI-P	6,962,417	48.82
Bibit Waluyo	Sudijono Sastroatmodjo	Demokrat	4,314,813	30.26
Hadi Prabowo	Don Murdono	PKS	2,982,715	20.92
Total			14,259,945	100.00
Valid votes			14,259,945	93.44
Invalid/blank votes			1,001,323	6.56
Total votes			15,261,268	100.00
Source: KPU
