= Muhammad Ismail (governor) =

Indonesian politician (1927–2008)

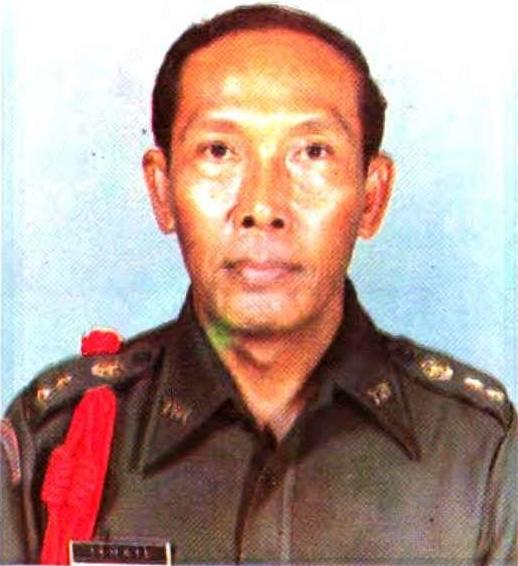
- Ismail as Diponegoro commander, c. 1982

Governor of Central Java
- In office 18 April 1983^{[a]} – 24 August 1993
- Preceded by: Soepardjo Rustam
- Succeeded by: Soewardi

Personal details
- Born: 31 December 1927; Cilacap, Dutch East Indies
- Died: 23 February 2008 (aged 80); Semarang, Central Java, Indonesia

Military service
- Allegiance: Indonesia
- Branch/service: Indonesian Army
- Rank: Lieutenant general
- Unit: Kostrad; Kodam I/Bukit Barisan; Kodam IV/Diponegoro
- a. Acting until 24 August 1983

Muhammad Ismail (31 December 1927 – 23 February 2008) was an Indonesian military officer and politician who served as the Governor of Central Java for two terms between 1983 and 1993. During his military career, he had been commander of Kostrad along with the Bukit Barisan and Diponegoro Military Regions.

== Early life ==
Ismail was born on 31 December 1927 in Maos, today part of Cilacap Regency. He graduated from the colonial elementary school Hollandsch-Inlandsche School in 1940, with his middle school studies at a Meer Uitgebreid Lager Onderwijs interrupted in 1942. He would complete middle school in 1945. Later, he enrolled at the Indonesian Military Academy, becoming part of the academy's first cohort.

== Career ==
He began his career as a military officer as a staff in the Yogyakarta Military District in 1948. During his career, he had spent some time studying public administration although he did not complete his degree, and also attended Bundeswehr Command and Staff College in West Germany. In 1976, he was appointed chief of staff of the Kostrad, then commander of the Bukit Barisan Military Region the following year. In 1980, he became commander of Kostrad. That same year, race riots broke out in Central Java, and two months later Ismail was appointed as commander of the Diponegoro Military Region covering the province. He held this post for two and a half years, and after his replacement Ismail held no postings for several months.

On 8 April 1983, with the governor of Central Java Soepardjo Rustam being appointed Minister of Home Affairs, Ismail was appointed as the new governor. By this time, Ismail held the rank of lieutenant general. He was made acting governor on 18 April 1983, and was officially sworn in as full governor on 24 August 1983. During his tenure, he banned car rallies and rock music concerts. He also renovated the facade of public buildings, replacing colonial European architecture styles with "traditional" styles of Central Java. Ismail was appointed for a second term in 1988. He was succeeded by Soewardi on 24 August 1993.

== Later life ==
Ismail died on 23 February 2008 at the Telogorejo Hospital in Semarang, after having experienced a heart failure. At the time of his death, he had five sons and three daughters from his marriage to E. Somarsiyah. He was buried the following day in a military ceremony at the Giri Tunggal Heroes' Cemetery in Semarang.
