= Soeroso =

Indonesian politician and trade unionist (1893–1981)

Raden Panji Soeroso
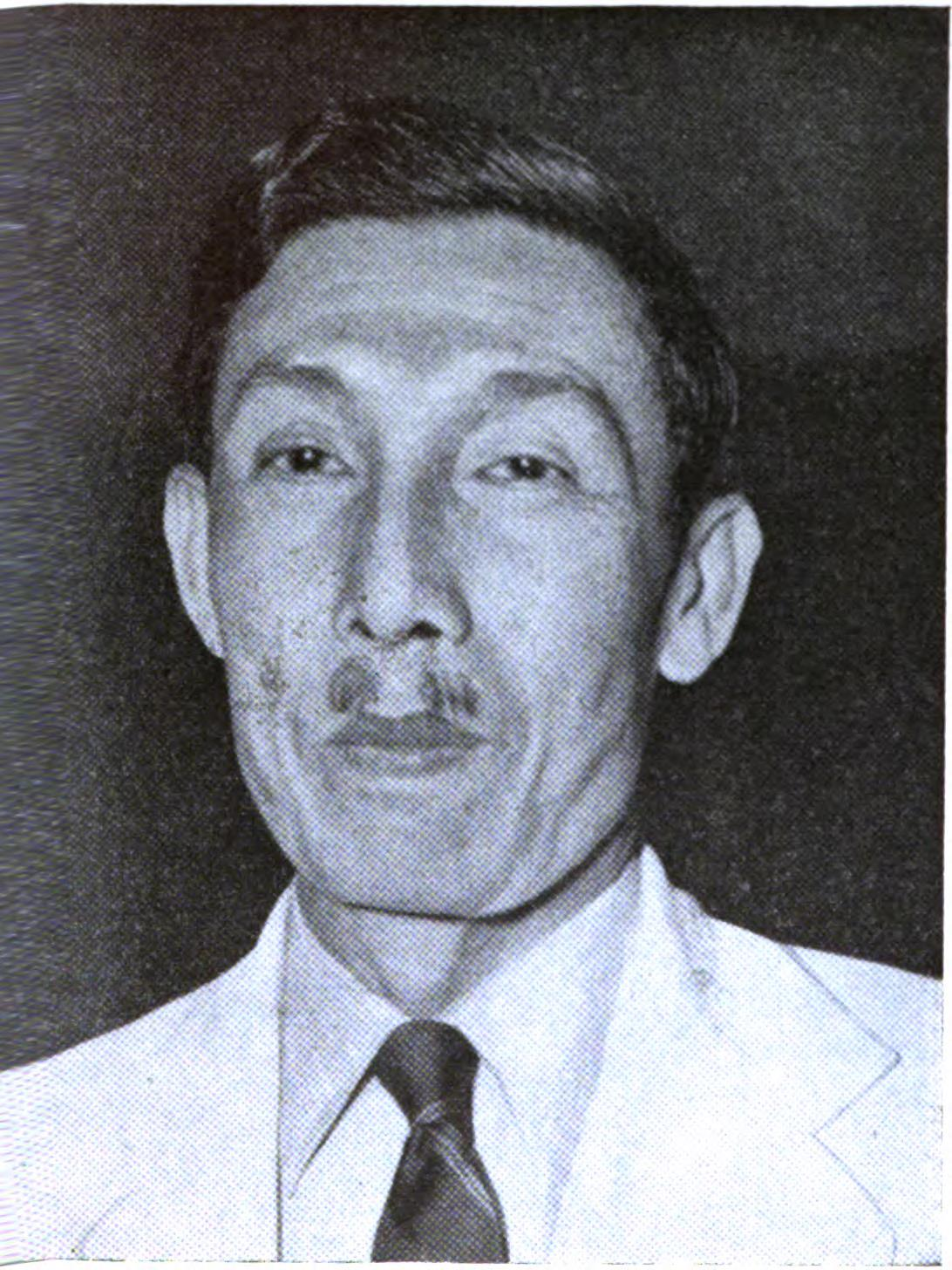
- Official portrait, c. 1954

1st Governor of Central Java
- In office 18 August 1945 – 13 October 1945
- Preceded by: Office established
- Succeeded by: Wongsonegoro
Ministerial offices
Minister of Public Works
In office 12 August 1955 – 24 March 1956
Prime Minister	Burhanuddin Harahap
Preceded by	Mohammad Hasan
Succeeded by	Mohammad Noor
Minister of Social Affairs
In office 9 May 1953 – 12 August 1955
Prime Minister	Ali Sastroamidjojo
Preceded by	Anwar Tjokroaminoto
Succeeded by	Soedibjo
Minister of Labor
In office 6 September 1950 – 27 April 1951
Prime Minister	Mohammad Natsir
Preceded by	Ma'as
Succeeded by	Iskandar Tedjasukmana

Personal details
- Born: 3 November 1893 Porong, Sidoarjo, East Java, Dutch East Indies
- Died: 16 May 1981 (aged 87) Indonesia
- Party: Parindra

Raden Panji Soeroso (EYD: Suroso; 3 November 1893 – 16 May 1981) was an Indonesian politician and labor union activist. He served in various positions throughout his career, including as the first governor of Central Java and a minister in several cabinets. He was also the leader of the Persatuan Vakbond Pegawei Negeri union federation and was active in the Parindra political party during the colonial period. He was also a member of the BPUPK and PPKI committees. He also founded the Civil Servants Cooperative Republic of Indonesia. In 1986, he was made a national hero by presidential decree. He died in Indonesia.

== Personal life ==
One of his sons was Raden Panji Soejono (1926–present), an antiquities expert and senior archaeologist in Indonesia. Soejono is a professor of prehistoric archeology at several universities in Indonesia. Among others: the University of Indonesia, Gadjah Mada University, and Udayana University. He was head of the National Archaeological Research Center (Pusat Penelitian Arkeologi Nasional) from 1974 to 1989.
