= Rustriningsih =

Indonesian politician

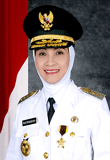

Vice Governor of Central Java
- In office 23 August 2008 – 23 August 2013
- Governor: Bibit Waluyo
- Preceded by: Ali Mufiz
- Succeeded by: Heru Sudjatmoko

Regent of Kebumen
- In office 2000–2008
- Preceded by: M Amin Soedibyo
- Succeeded by: Nashiruddin Al Mansyur

Personal details
- Born: 3 July 1967 (age 57); Kedungampel, Kebumen, Indonesia

Rustriningsih (born 3 July 1967) is an Indonesian politician who served as the Vice Governor of Central Java between 2008 and 2013. Previously, she served two terms as the regent of Kebumen. She was formerly a member of PDI-P, until she left the party around 2014 following her support for Prabowo Subianto in the 2014 Indonesian presidential election.

== Early life and education ==
Rustriningsih was born in Kedungampel village of Kebumen, Central Java on 3 July 1967 as the eighth of ten children. Her father Sukamto was a PNI activist during the Sukarno government and, later on, was active in PDI activities. After completing her basic education, she studied in General Soedirman University's faculty of social and political sciences. While there, she once trained PDI cadres, allowing her to meet Megawati Soekarnoputri.

== Career ==
=== Pre-regent ===
After graduating from university, Rustriningsih began a catering business and a news agency, both based in her parents' house. The news agency eventually grew to employ 28 people.

In political activities, she joined PDI's regional board on 1993, and by 1996 was the chief of PDI's Kebumen branch. When PDI encountered internal conflict and government intervention in 1996, Rustriningsih was a Megawati loyalist, forming sub-branches for the party and being arrested (though always later released) several times. Following the fall of Suharto, Rustriningsih became the head of Kebumen's General Elections Commission.

=== Regent ===
Rustriningsih was first elected as regent of her home regency of Kebumen in 2000 after gaining 22 votes from the municipal council to her opponent's 20. Her running mate was Nashiruddin Al-Mansyur, an influential local kyai. Throughout her first term, she focused on populist development projects supporting small-scale enterprises and was consistent in opposing corruption. She would feature every morning on Kebumen's local TV station RATIH TV in an interactive program Selamat Pagi Bupati (Good morning Regent), where she would directly answer questions about problems in Kebumen from viewers. She adopted a reformist and trustworthy image, and received an "Outstanding Women in Local Government" from UNESCAP, and was featured by CNN.

In 2005, she ran for her second term in the regency's first direct local election. Sometime around 2004, she also adopted a headscarf (after going on hajj and marrying her husband), adopting a more pious image. In the following election, she won in a landslide, securing a victory in 25 out of 26 subdistricts in Kebumen.

=== Vice governor ===
During her second term as regent, Rustriningsih ran as Bibit Waluyo's running mate for the governorship of Central Java and won. The pair was sworn in on 23 August 2008. In the five-year tenure, she would attempt and fail to become the head of PDI-P's provincial board in Central Java, with her brother also losing in Kebumen's 2010 regency election.

In 2013, she registered with her party to run for the governorship of Central Java. While she had significant popularity in the province, the party decided to not endorse her at the last moment. According to a Gerindra leader, she could have sought the support of other parties, but did not do so.

=== PDIP ===
Though Rustriningsih had been part of the Indonesian Democratic Party (PDI) during the New Order, she would be appointed as a member of its consultative body in 2001. She received significant coverage in media, and received attention and funding from human rights organizations abroad due to her perceived position as member of an oppressed group. She had also become the leader of PDI-P's local office in Kebumen.

For the 2014 Indonesian presidential election, Rustriningsih endorsed the Prabowo Subianto/Hatta Rajasa pair - opposed to her party, who endorsed the Joko Widodo/Jusuf Kalla ticket. Due to this, PDI-P leader Megawati Soekarnoputri called for her to leave the party, and she ended up leaving that year. Prior to this, she had also encountered some internal controversy in her party due to her status as one of the initial founders of Nasdem prior to its establishment as a political party.

=== Post-2014 ===
Rustriningsih was proposed as a possible running mate to Sudirman Said in the 2018 Central Java gubernatorial election, but she ended up not running. In the election itself, the PDI-P backed candidate and incumbent Ganjar Pranowo lost in Kebumen, and the defeat was attributed to Rustriningsih's influence in the regency. She again campaigned for Prabowo in the 2019 Indonesian presidential election.

== Personal life ==
Rustriningsih married Soni Achmad Saleh Ashar in 2004, and has five children (one adopted) as of February 2010.
