= Wongsonegoro =

Indonesian politician (1895–1974)

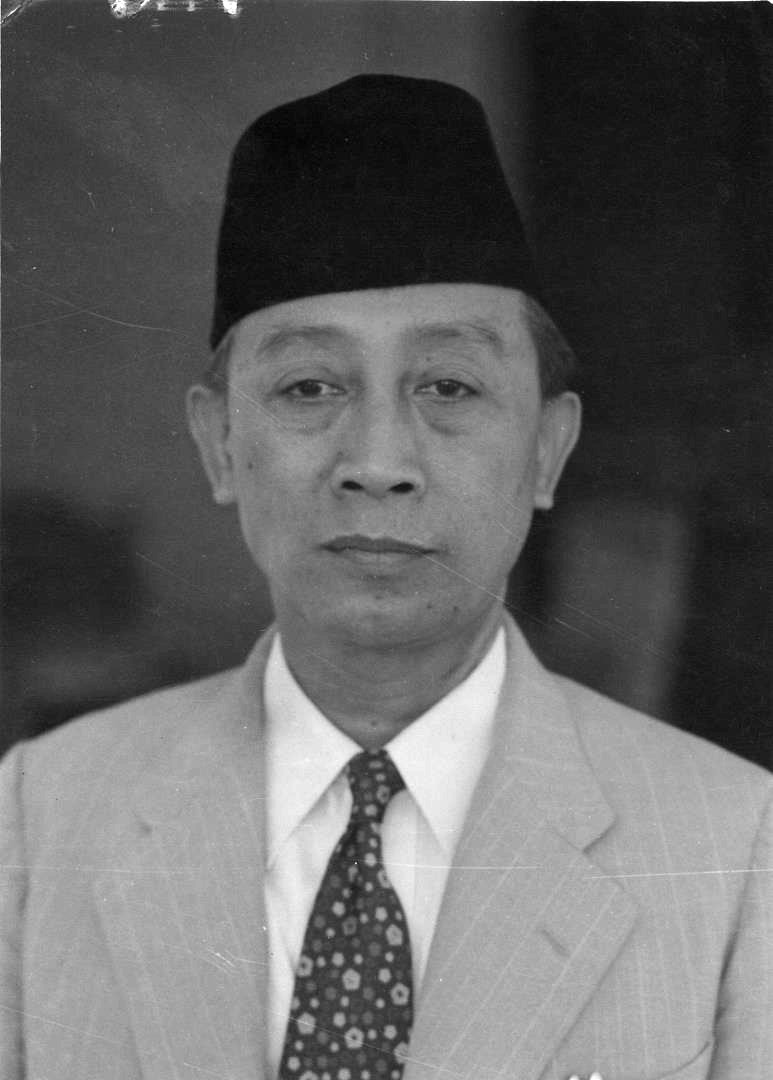
- Portrait, c. 1950s

2nd Governor of Central Java
- In office 13 October 1945 – 4 August 1949
- Preceded by: Soeroso
- Succeeded by: Boedijono

5th Regent of Sragen
- In office 1939–1944
- Preceded by: Yudonegoro
- Succeeded by: Darmonegoro

Ministerial roles
- 1949: Minister of Home Affairs
- 1950–1951: Minister of Justice
- 1951–1952: Minister of Education
- 1953–1954: Deputy Prime Minister
- 1953–1954: Acting Minister of National Welfare

Personal details
- Born: Raden Mas Soenardi; 20 April 1895 Surakarta, Dutch East Indies
- Died: 4 March 1974 (aged 78) Jakarta, Indonesia
- Resting place: Tirip village, Sukoharjo, Central Java, Indonesia
- Party: Great Indonesia Unity Party
- Spouse: B. R. A. Soewarni
- Children: 7
- Education: Rechtshoogeschool
- Occupation: Politician

Kanjeng Raden Mas Tumenggung Wongsonegoro (20 April 1895 (Note: Another version places his date of birth on 20 April 1897) – 4 March 1974 (Note: Another version places his date of death on 6 March 1978)) was an Indonesian politician who served in various offices, including as deputy prime minister and governor of Central Java. He also served as a minister several times.

== Biography ==
=== Early life and education ===
Wongsonegoro was born on 20 April 1895, in Surakarta, Central Java, as R. M. Soenardi. His father was RM. Ngabehi Tjitodiprodjo (the abdi dalem panewu of Susuhunan Pakubuwono X) and R.A Soenartinah. He started his education at the Standardschool, before continuing to the Europeesche Lagere School (ELS), an elementary school for Europeans and indigenous people of noble descent, and graduated in 1911. He again continued his education at the Meer Uitgebreid Lager Onderwijs (MULO) school, the equivalent of junior high school, which he completed in 1914.

After this, he continued his studies at the Rechts school. He then worked as a self-employed government employee to support his education. He studied at the Rechtshoogeschool in Batavia and completed his education in 1919. In Batavia, he was active in several student movements and associations. After finishing his education, Wongsonegoro worked at the Surakarta District Court (Landraad) in 1917. He continued his career at the kepatihan office with the rank of Panewu, then became a prosecutor. Wongsonegoro was also active in the Budi Utomo and Jong Java organizations. Within Budi Utomo, Wongsonegoro was a confidant of the Chairman of the Budi Utomo Executive Board, allowing him to mingle more broadly with many of the organization's leaders. In 1939, until the arrival of the Japanese occupation government, Wongsonegoro served as Regent of Sragen.

=== Struggle for Independence ===
When the Japanese occupation government established the Investigating Committee for Preparatory Work for Independence (BPUPK), he became one of the members of the body, sitting on the Constitution Drafting Committee, which was chaired by future-president Sukarno. He took part in preparing the formulation of Article 2 and Article 9 of the 1945 Constitution (regarding religion) and also participated in the debate about it. The debate was mainly concerned with the wording of the tenet of Pancasila. At the time, it read "Belief in the one and only God, with Muslims required to follow Sharia law". This was feared to come into conflict with adat culture and unnecessarily burden those from other religions. It was eventually changed by future Vice President Mohammad Hatta.

After the Proclamation of Indonesian Independence, Wongsonegoro took office Fuko Syutjokan, a position at the provincial level during the Japanese occupation, in Semarang. On 19 August 1945, Wongsonegoro announced over the radio that all power over the Semarang area was declared to be included in the territory of the Republic of Indonesia. Wongsonegoro was then appointed became the deputy governor of Central Java who was domiciled at a time in Semarang, while Raden Pandji Soeroso was serving as Governor of Central Java. A few months later, he was appointed Governor of Central Java, replacing Soeroso.

=== Post-independence career ===
The following year he replaced Abdoel Gaffar Pringgodigdo as Minister of Justice during the Natsir Cabinet, serving from 6 September 1950 to 27 April 1951. In early February 1951, he attempted to pass legislation requiring the election of a Constituent Assembly; however, the Natsir Cabinet collapsed before the bill could be passed. Wongsonegoro himself was asked to resign by his party before the collapse. He then became Minister of Education and Culture from 27 April 1951 to 3 April 1952.

Afterwards, he served as the formateur of the First Ali Sastroamidjojo Cabinet, completing the cabinet after 58 days of parliamentary crisis. Wongsonegoro received a mixed reception as formateur, with nationalist and communist groups in favour and Muslim and socialist groups against him. Communist Party leader Dipa Nusantara Aidit, a hearty supporter of Wongsonegoro, spoke extremely softly (and thus, in Javanese culture, politely) to him at public meetings, to the point that at times the formateur "was obliged to ask another participant to be [Adiet's] microphone".

Meanwhile, the Masyumi Party was staunchly against him, expressing concern for his attempt to keep the Socialist Party out of the cabinet. When he eventually finished forming the cabinet on 31 July 1953, he had lost support from Christian political parties and Masyumi, replacing their candidates with minor and communist-sympathizing groups. Wongsonegoro took the position of Deputy Prime Minister in this cabinet, later taking on additional duties as acting Minister of State with Responsibility for State Welfare on 29 September 1953. He resigned from both positions on 23 October.

=== Death and legacy ===
Wongsonegoro died on 4 March 1974 in the capital city of Jakarta. His body was buried in the Kendaran Palace Family Cemetery in Tirip Village, Sukoharjo, Surakarta. At the location of his grave, there is a monument with the phrase "Janma Luwih Hambuka Tunggal," which means that people who have more ability will always be closer to the Creator. There is also written "Haruming Sabda Haruming Budi," which means a person who always speaks good words in the correct sense, describes the personality of a virtuous person.
