= Ahmad Luthfi =

Indonesian police officer (born 1966)

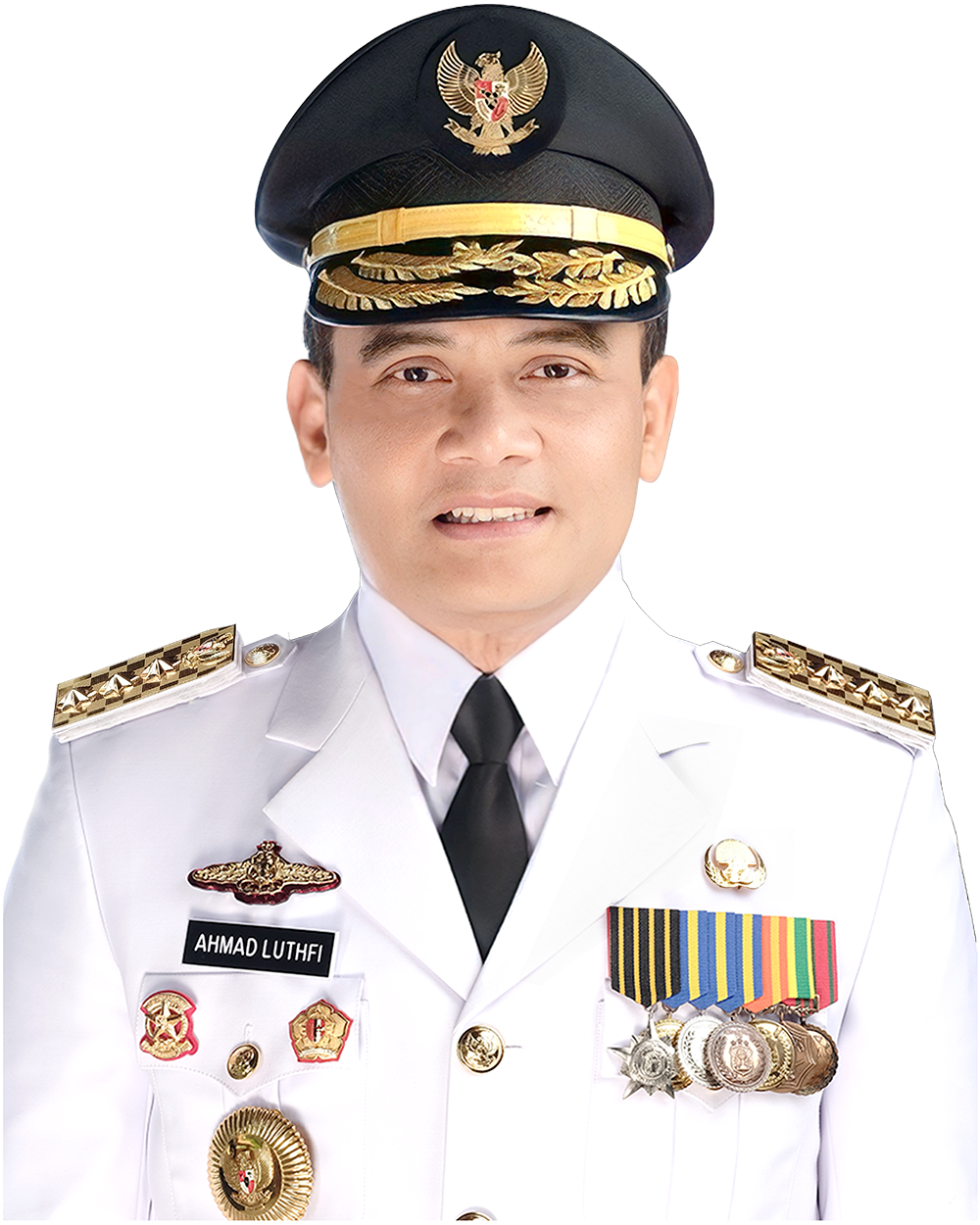
- Official portrait, 2025

16th Governor of Central Java
- Incumbent
- Assumed office 20 February 2025
- Vice Governor: Taj Yasin Maimoen
- Preceded by: Ganjar Pranowo; Nana Sudjana (acting)

Chief of Central Java Regional Police
- In office 1 May 2020 – 26 July 2024
- Preceded by: Amelza Dahniel
- Succeeded by: Wibowo Day Noise

Vice Chief of Central Java Regional Police
- In office 8 March 2018 – 1 May 2020
- Preceded by: Indrajit
- Succeeded by: Abiyoso Seno Aji

Inspector General of the Ministry of Trade
- In office 14 August 2024 – 17 October 2024
- President: Joko Widodo
- Preceded by: Veri Anggrijono
- Succeeded by: Putu Jayan Danu Putra

Personal details
- Born: Ahmad Luthfi; 22 November 1966 (age 59) Surabaya, East Java, Indonesia
- Party: Gerindra (2024–present)
- Other political affiliations: KIM Plus (2024–present)
- Spouse: Nurina Mulki Wati
- Children: 2
- Occupation: Police
- Police career
- Allegiance: Indonesia
- Branch: Indonesian National Police
- Service years: 1989–2024
- Rank: Police-Commissioner General

Ahmad Luthfi (born 22 November 1966) is an Indonesian police officer and politician who has served as the 16th governor of Central Java since February 2025. He was previously a three-star police general, with his last office being the chief of Central Java police from 2020 until 2024. He also served as Inspector General of the Ministry of Trade between August and October 2024.

== Early life and education ==
Luthfi was born on 22 November 1969 in Surabaya, the capital city of East Java, as the son of Makali and Musarofah. He studied law at an unidentified college and graduated in 1990. He later pursued a master's degree in policing and graduated in 1995.

== Police career ==
=== Early career ===
Luthfi joined the police forces in 1989, prior to his graduation. He began his career with the rank of police second inspector upon completing a brief police preparatory course. He was assigned at the central police headquarters for two years before receiving a promotion to the rank of police first inspector. He was then rotated to the police provost service, religious service, and the intelligence services, serving in various roles and positions.

=== Batang ===
In 2008, Luthfi was appointed as the police chief of the Batang Regency in Central Java with the rank of adjunct chief commissioner. During his tenure, Luthfi was confronted with the hardline Islamic Defenders Front in the region, who planned to do their own unauthorized sweeping due to their distrust in the police. Luthfi also faced a bus accident which resulted in the death of fifteen passengers and the death of an unidentified woman.

=== Surakarta ===
After two years serving in Batang, Luthfi was appointed as the deputy intelligence director of the Central Java Police. A year later, on 11 April 2011, Luthfi was installed as the deputy police chief of Surakarta. During this period, Luthfi maintained relations with Surakarta's mayor, Joko Widodo, who later become the president of Indonesia. Luthfi's relations with Joko Widodo prompted experts to identify him as part of the Solo Gang, a group of Indonesian police and military active in Surakarta during Widodo's mayoralty who were promoted into high-ranking positions during Widodo's presidency. Luthfi served as deputy to two different police chiefs: Nana Sudjana and Listyo Sigit Prabowo.

Luthfi received a promotion to the rank of chief commissioner at the end of his tenure as deputy police chief. He was reassigned to the Profession and Security Division and the Police Education and Training Institute. In February 2015, Luthfi returned to Surakarta along with his appointment as the police chief of Surakarta.

On 5 July 2016, a suicide bomb exploded in front of Luthfi's office in the police station. The bomb resulted in the death of the bomber and a policewoman suffering light wounds from the shrapnels. After the bombings, Luthfi encouraged Surakarta residents to continue their activity as usual.

=== Jakarta ===
Luthfi was replaced from his position as police chief of Surakarta by Ribut Hari Wibowo from the East Java police on 14 March 2017. He was assigned to Jakarta as analyst for socio-cultural affairs in the central intelligence and security services.

=== Central Java ===
Luthfi was later appointed as the deputy chief of Central Java police lon 21 March 2018 and received a promotion to the rank of police brigadier general on 4 April. His appointment as deputy chief was criticized by the Indonesia Police Watch, who considered Luthfi as lacking experience to hold the post.

About two years later, he was promoted as the police chief of Central Java on 8 May 2020. Indonesian Police Watch described Luthfi's appointment as "phenomenal", as it was the first time a non-police academy graduate became the police chief of the province. He left the position after four years of service on 29 July 2024.

=== Inspector General of the Ministry of Trade ===
In June 2024, the central police announced that Ahmad Luthfi was nominated as the inspector general of the ministry of trade and that his appointment is still awaiting confirmation from the president and the assessment of his competence tests. The nomination sparked criticism from the IPW, who questioned the lack of qualified bureaucrats available to fill the post. Luthfi's appointment was made possible through the TNI/Polri law, which was enacted several months prior to his nomination and paved the way for police and military officers to held civilian posts. Luthfi's nomination continued despite the sustained criticism, and he was installed as inspector general of the trade ministry on 14 August 2024. Prior to his inauguration, he had already been promoted to a three-star police commissioner general on 29 July.
