= Haryanto =

People named Haryanto:

- Andrew Haryanto (born 1977), Indonesian racing driver
- Daniel Rudi Haryanto (born 1978), an international-award-winning Indonesian documentary filmmaker
- Rio Haryanto (born 1993), Indonesian racing driver
- Trikus Haryanto, known as Tri Kusharjanto, Indonesian badminton player
- Halim Haryanto (born 1976), Indonesian badminton player
- Haryanto Prasetyo (born 1978)

== See also ==
- Harianto (born 1977), Indonesian footballer
