= Central Java Regional House of Representatives =

Unicameral legislature of the Indonesian province of Central Java

Central Java Province Regional House of Representatives Dewan Perwakilan Rakyat Daerah Provinsi Jawa Tengah ꦣꦺꦮꦤ꧀ꦥꦼꦂꦮꦏꦶꦭꦤ꧀ꦫꦏꦾꦠ꧀ꦝꦌꦫꦃꦥꦿꦺꦴꦮ꦳ꦶꦤ꧀ꦱꦶꦗꦮꦶꦩꦣꦾ
- 2024–2029 Period
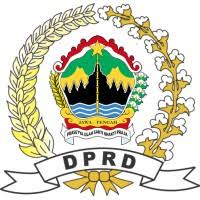

Type
- Type: Unicameral
- Term limits: 5 years

History
- Founded: 1950; 76 years ago
- New session started: 3 September 2024

Leadership
- Speaker: Sumanto, PDI-P since 15 October 2024
- Deputy Speaker: Sarif Abdillah, PKB since 15 October 2024
- Deputy Speaker: Heri P., Gerindra since 15 October 2024
- Deputy Speaker: Mohammad Saleh, Golkar since 15 October 2024
- Deputy Speaker: Setya Arinugroho, PKS since 15 October 2024

Structure
- Seats: 120
- Political groups: Government (87): PKB (20); Gerindra (17); Golkar (17); NasDem (3); PKS (11); PAN (4); Democratic (7); PSI (2); PPP (6); Opposition (33): PDI-P (33)

Elections
- Voting system: Open list proportional representation
- Last election: 14 February 2024
- Next election: 2029

Meeting place
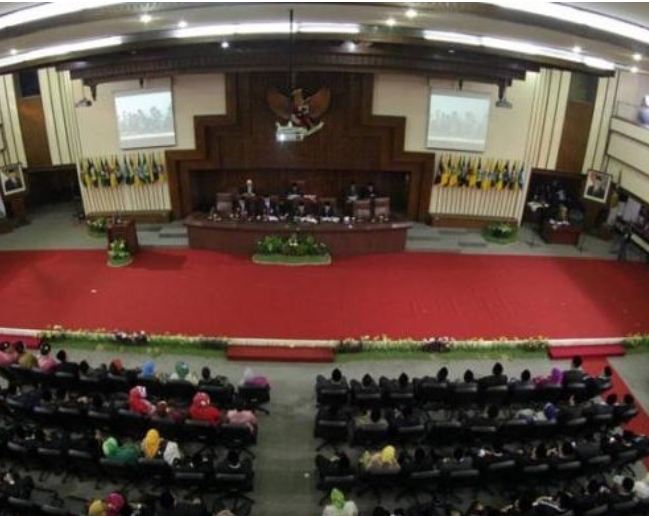
- Central Java Regional House of Representatives; Pahlawan Street Number 7 South Semarang, Semarang; Central Java, Indonesia

Website
- dprd.jatengprov.go.id

The Central Java Regional House of Representatives (Indonesian: Dewan Perwakilan Rakyat Daerah Provinsi Jawa Tengah; Javanese: ꦣꦺꦮꦤ꧀ꦥꦼꦂꦮꦏꦶꦭꦤ꧀ꦫꦏꦾꦠ꧀ꦝꦌꦫꦃꦥꦿꦺꦴꦮ꦳ꦶꦤ꧀ꦱꦶꦗꦮꦶꦩꦣꦾ, romanized: Dhéwan Perwakilan Rakyat Dhaérah Provinsi Jawi Madya, abbreviated to DPRD Jateng) is the unicameral legislature of the Indonesian province of Central Java. Consisting of 120 people from the political parties with the most votes and elected every five years together with the national legislative election.

== General election results ==
=== 2024 Indonesian legislative election ===
The official valid votes received by political parties contesting the 2024 Indonesian legislative election in each electoral district (constituency) for the Central Java Regional House of Representatives are as follows.

2024 Indonesian legislative election results

Electoral district	PKB	Gerindra	PDI-P	Golkar	NasDem	Labour	Gelora	PKS	PKN	Hanura	Garuda	PAN	PBB	Democratic	PSI	Perindo	PPP	Ummat	Valid votes
Central Java 1	61,949	111,427	286,837	62,143	58,394	9,108	9,217	95,269	1,159	2,721	3,094	25,446	3,543	57,160	77,716	9,637	29,396	4,023	908,239
Central Java 2	195,741	126,306	366,733	111,801	32,891	8,168	10,624	113,179	1,759	5,913	2,937	55,384	2,943	63,001	49,343	16,869	119,320	5,207	1,288,119
Central Java 3	293,966	254,306	318,804	259,178	117,366	8,557	11,034	75,454	1,870	19,023	6,175	71,663	2,063	86,498	37,123	44,430	145,439	6,537	1,759,486
Central Java 4	174,458	121,743	187,460	97,404	24,066	5,521	44,005	54,630	1,561	16,843	3,114	12,154	1,549	114,362	19,771	5,225	144,395	2,463	1,030,724
Central Java 5	235,198	168,909	337,904	100,184	63,633	6,087	7,394	80,560	2,816	59,608	3,041	11,632	1,528	98,033	26,445	7,845	69,858	2,194	1,282,869
Central Java 6	142,624	141,866	716,105	265,284	15,558	6,703	12,955	197,447	1,594	2,911	2,439	79,130	1,012	120,117	30,724	3,756	9,053	3,788	1,753,066
Central Java 7	116,086	234,796	536,249	186,064	38,175	8,006	8,106	200,647	1,608	3,509	5,889	66,651	2,654	73,326	91,422	9,363	15,379	8,541	1,606,471
Central Java 8	182,270	222,694	615,424	111,308	18,525	7,069	8,147	139,054	2,264	2,781	2,776	34,631	1,042	58,158	30,530	6,111	58,282	8,274	1,509,340
Central Java 9	244,935	177,512	357,167	147,874	51,153	4,613	7,316	80,070	1,645	9,012	3,866	51,944	1,610	134,424	19,740	8,229	76,266	6,281	1,383,657
Central Java 10	269,516	208,509	366,185	177,133	152,683	6,243	16,095	181,158	2,046	3,753	3,755	92,386	1,572	121,784	19,879	13,565	75,118	5,426	1,716,806
Central Java 11	301,472	305,446	478,965	229,112	140,099	13,820	16,935	134,839	4,252	3,658	4,201	124,746	1,635	121,173	28,643	25,482	91,823	9,407	2,035,708
Central Java 12	367,113	297,011	390,571	283,020	35,494	9,936	13,502	153,923	1,480	4,469	2,955	113,860	1,308	63,167	21,290	11,639	78,810	10,040	1,859,588
Central Java 13	451,136	222,361	311,857	223,192	27,852	9,000	12,781	114,839	2,152	4,809	3,269	101,190	2,056	48,707	25,437	17,323	100,896	10,102	1,688,959
Total	3,036,464	2,592,886	5,270,261	2,253,697	775,889	102,831	178,111	1,621,069	26,206	139,010	47,511	840,817	24,515	1,159,910	478,063	179,474	1,014,035	82,283	19,823,032
Source: General Elections Commission of Indonesia

== Composition ==
The following is the composition of members of the Central Java Regional House of Representatives in the last five periods.

Party	Total seats				
Party	2004–2009	2009–2014	2014–2019	2019–2024	2024–2029
PKB seats	15	▼9	▲13	▲20	20
Gerindra seats		9	▲11	▲13	▲17
PDI-P seats	31	▼23	▲27	▲42	▼33
Golkar seats	18	▼11	▼10	▲12	▲17
NasDem seats			4	▼3	3
PKS seats	7	▲10	10	10	▲11
Hanura seats		4	▼0	0	0
PAN seats	10	10	▼8	▼6	▼4
Demokrat seats	9	▲16	▼9	▼5	▲7
PSI seats				0	▲2
PPP seats	10	▼7	▲8	▲9	▼6
PKNU seats		1			
Total Seats	100	100	100	▲120	120
Total Party	7	▲10	▼9	9	▲10

== Electoral District ==
In the 2019 Legislative Election and the 2024 Legislative Election, the Central Java Regional House of Representatives election was divided into 13 electoral districts as follows:

Electoral District Name	Electoral District Area	Number of Seats
CENTRAL JAVA 1	Semarang	6
CENTRAL JAVA 2	Semarang Regency, Kendal Regency, Salatiga	7
CENTRAL JAVA 3	Kudus Regency, Jepara Regency, Demak Regency	10
CENTRAL JAVA 4	Rembang Regency, Pati Regency	6
CENTRAL JAVA 5	Grobogan Regency, Blora Regency	8
CENTRAL JAVA 6	Wonogiri Regency, Karanganyar Regency, Sragen Regency	10
CENTRAL JAVA 7	Klaten Regency, Sukoharjo Regency, Surakarta	10
CENTRAL JAVA 8	Magelang Regency, Boyolali Regency, Magelang	8
CENTRAL JAVA 9	Purworejo Regency, Wonosobo Regency, Temanggung Regency	8
CENTRAL JAVA 10	Purbalingga Regency, Banjarnegara Regency, Kebumen Regency	11
CENTRAL JAVA 11	Cilacap Regency, Banyumas Regency	12
CENTRAL JAVA 12	Tegal Regency, Brebes Regency, Tegal	12
CENTRAL JAVA 13	Batang Regency, Pekalongan Regency, Pemalang Regency, Pekalongan	12
TOTAL		120

== List of members ==
=== 2024–2029 Period ===
The following is a list of members of the Central Java Regional House of Representatives for the 2024–2029 term.

Member Name	Political party	Electoral District	Valid Vote	Faction	Information
Kholid Abdillah	PKB	Central Java 2	57.550	PKB	
Ulil Albab, S.Psi.	PKB	Central Java 3	109.202	PKB	
Hj. Nur Saadah, S.Pd.I., M.H.	PKB	Central Java 3	94.577	PKB	
H. Sugiarto, S.T., S.H., M.Sos., CHt.	PKB	Central Java 4	65.619	PKB	
Niken Mayasari	PKB	Central Java 5	71.237	PKB	
Abdulah Aminudin	PKB	Central Java 5	44.440	PKB	
Mukafi Fadli, S.T., S.Ag.	PKB	Central Java 6	51.719	PKB	
Aminudin Latif, S.Pd.I.	PKB	Central Java 7	36.574	PKB	
Drs. Moh. Budiyono, B.Sc.	PKB	Central Java 8	66.718	PKB	
Zainuddin, S.H.I.	PKB	Central Java 9	70.758	PKB	
Muhaimin	PKB	Central Java 9	62.291	PKB	
Ni’matul Azizah, S.H.I.	PKB	Central Java 10	74.028	PKB	
Zaki Mubarok	PKB	Central Java 10	36.336	PKB	
H. Sarif Abdillah, S.Pd.I.	PKB	Central Java 11	97.477	PKB	1st Deputy Speaker
Hj. Siti Rosidah, S.Ag.	PKB	Central Java 11	52.180	PKB	
H. Musyaffa	PKB	Central Java 12	91.415	PKB	
Abdul Aziz, S.I.P.	PKB	Central Java 12	44.803	PKB	
H. Abdul Hamid, S.Pd.I.	PKB	Central Java 13	113.148	PKB	
Muktafa Dimyati Rois	PKB	Central Java 13	89.164	PKB	
Sumarwati, S.Pd., M.A.P.	PKB	Central Java 13	56.840	PKB	
Sudarsono S.	Gerindra	Central Java 1	39.448	Gerindra	
Mifta Reza NP., S.P., M.M.	Gerindra	Central Java 2	48.456	Gerindra	
Hj. Sri Hartini, S.T.	Gerindra	Central Java 3	82.267	Gerindra	
Noval Utoyo Adji	Gerindra	Central Java 4	59.955	Gerindra	
Rohmat Marzuki, S.Hut. (2024–2025)	Gerindra	Central Java 5	59.451	Gerindra	Resigned from his position because he had been appointed as Vice Minister of Forestry
Moehammad Noer Dhuha (2026–present)	Gerindra	Central Java 5	17.088	Gerindra	Interim replacement in the name of Rohmat Marzuki, S.Hut.
Drs. Wagiyo Ahmad Nugroho, M.H. (2024–2025)	Gerindra	Central Java 6	36.640	Gerindra	Died on 6 June 2025.
Subandi P. R. (2026–present)	Gerindra	Central Java 6	13.573	Gerindra	Interim replacement in the name of Drs. Wagiyo Ahmad Nugroho, M.H.
Yudi Indras W.	Gerindra	Central Java 7	41.797	Gerindra	
P. Bayu Kusuma, S.T.	Gerindra	Central Java 7	40.598	Gerindra	
Ir. Sukardiyono	Gerindra	Central Java 8	63.876	Gerindra	
Drs. Heri P. alias Heri Londo	Gerindra	Central Java 9	85.637	Gerindra	2nd Deputy Speaker
Dwi Yasmanto	Gerindra	Central Java 10	36.850	Gerindra	
David Ishaq Aryadi, S.E., M.M.	Gerindra	Central Java 11	72.443	Gerindra	
Shinta Laila, S.H., M.H.	Gerindra	Central Java 11	56.116	Gerindra	
H. M. Iskhak, S.H., M.A., M.M.	Gerindra	Central Java 12	65.078	Gerindra	
Orizah Santifa	Gerindra	Central Java 12	46.443	Gerindra	
H. Iskandar Zulkarnain	Gerindra	Central Java 13	81.660	Gerindra	
Muh. Rizqi Iskandar Muda	Gerindra	Central Java 13	23.513	Gerindra	
Krisseptiana alias Tia Hendi	PDI-P	Central Java 1	110.338	PDI Perjuangan	
Rr. Maria Tri Mangesti, S.E.	PDI-P	Central Java 1	30.255	PDI Perjuangan	
Bagus Suryokusumo, S.Pd.	PDI-P	Central Java 2	83.969	PDI Perjuangan	
Leonardo Ludwig Krisnada	PDI-P	Central Java 2	41.023	PDI Perjuangan	
Andang Wahyu Triyanto, S.E., M.M.	PDI-P	Central Java 3	77.000	PDI Perjuangan	
Denny Nurcahyanto, S.E.	PDI-P	Central Java 3	58.873	PDI Perjuangan	
H. Endro Dwi Cahyono, S.T.	PDI-P	Central Java 4	63.108	PDI Perjuangan	
A. Baginda Muhammad Mahfuz H.	PDI-P	Central Java 5	84.387	PDI Perjuangan	
Yohanes Winarto, S.H., M.H.	PDI-P	Central Java 5	43.287	PDI Perjuangan	
H. Sumanto, S.H.	PDI-P	Central Java 6	170.579	PDI Perjuangan	Speaker
Wulan Purnama Sari	PDI-P	Central Java 6	135.958	PDI Perjuangan	
Mulyadi, S.E., M.M.	PDI-P	Central Java 6	33.648	PDI Perjuangan	
Ari Santoso	PDI-P	Central Java 6	33.433	PDI Perjuangan	
Ir. H. Joko Purnomo, M.H.	PDI-P	Central Java 7	122.210	PDI Perjuangan	
Hj. Kadarwati, S.H., M.H.	PDI-P	Central Java 7	54.026	PDI Perjuangan	
Hartanto	PDI-P	Central Java 7	46.618	PDI Perjuangan	
Sumarsono, S.Sos.	PDI-P	Central Java 7	43.252	PDI Perjuangan	
Dwi Adi Agung Nugroho, S.I.Kom.	PDI-P	Central Java 8	115.042	PDI Perjuangan	
Ayuning Sekar Suci, B.Bus., M.A.	PDI-P	Central Java 8	101.164	PDI Perjuangan	
Endrianingsih Yunita H., S.P.	PDI-P	Central Java 8	83.297	PDI Perjuangan	
Ribut Budi Santoso, S.P.	PDI-P	Central Java 8	77.525	PDI Perjuangan	
Muhammad Isnaeni	PDI-P	Central Java 9	104.978	PDI Perjuangan	
Muhammad Hajar Zainudin, S.Sos., M.Hum.	PDI-P	Central Java 9	49.812	PDI Perjuangan	
Hj. Sri Ruwiyati, S.E., M.M. (2024)	PDI-P	Central Java 10	80.912	PDI Perjuangan	Died on 27 September 2024.
H. Moch. Ichwan, S.H., M.M. (2025–present)	PDI-P	Central Java 10	36.312	PDI Perjuangan	Interim replacement in the name of Hj. Sri Ruwiyati, S.E., M.M.
Saiful Hadi, S.I.Kom.	PDI-P	Central Java 10	37.948	PDI Perjuangan	
Bambang Hariyanto	PDI-P	Central Java 11	104.301	PDI Perjuangan	
Juli Krisdianto, S.E.	PDI-P	Central Java 11	66.004	PDI Perjuangan	
Asfirla Harisanto, S.E.	PDI-P	Central Java 11	29.772	PDI Perjuangan	
dr. Messy Widiastuti, M.A.R.S.	PDI-P	Central Java 12	78.898	PDI Perjuangan	
H. Sarei Abdul Rosyid, S.IP.	PDI-P	Central Java 12	43.393	PDI Perjuangan	
M. G. Marhaenismanto Oni	PDI-P	Central Java 12	39.980	PDI Perjuangan	
Hj. Irna Setiawati, S.E., M.M.	PDI-P	Central Java 13	42.930	PDI Perjuangan	
Putro Negoro Rekthosetho, S.H., M.Kn.	PDI-P	Central Java 13	6.596	PDI Perjuangan	
H. M. Dipa Yustia Pasa, S.H., M.Kn.	Golkar	Central Java 1	19.660	Golkar	
H. Yusuf Hidayat	Golkar	Central Java 2	37.309	Golkar	
H. Siswanto, S.T., M.T.	Golkar	Central Java 3	77.363	Golkar	
Arif Wahyudi, S.H.	Golkar	Central Java 3	59.851	Golkar	
Supriyanto, S.H.	Golkar	Central Java 4	62.802	Golkar	
Padmasari Mestikajati, S.IP., M.Si.	Golkar	Central Java 5	28.907	Golkar	
Bondan Sejiwan Boma Aji, S.Sos., M.M.	Golkar	Central Java 6	104.658	Golkar	
Catur Agus Saptono, S.H., M.H.	Golkar	Central Java 6	78.897	Golkar	
Drs. Anton Lami Suhadi, M.Si.	Golkar	Central Java 7	60.584	Golkar	
Drs. H. Soenarno, M.M.	Golkar	Central Java 8	49.876	Golkar	
Imam Teguh Purnomo, S.E., Akt.	Golkar	Central Java 9	68.930	Golkar	
Ferry Wawan Cahyono	Golkar	Central Java 10	97.691	Golkar	
Tietha Ernawati Suwarto, S.P., MBA.	Golkar	Central Java 11	84.030	Golkar	
Drs. H. Masfui Masduki, M.M.	Golkar	Central Java 12	85.973	Golkar	
Andiniya K. P., S.Sos., M.H.	Golkar	Central Java 12	63.272	Golkar	
Mohammad Saleh	Golkar	Central Java 13	78.443	Golkar	3rd Deputy Speaker
Harun Abdul Khafizh	Golkar	Central Java 13	36.589	Golkar	
H. Akhwan, S.H.	NasDem	Central Java 3	45.582	Amanat NasDem Solidaritas	
dr. Faiz Alaudien Reza Mardhika	NasDem	Central Java 10	107.828	Amanat NasDem Solidaritas	
Edris Santoso	NasDem	Central Java 11	46.439	Amanat NasDem Solidaritas	
H. Muhammad Afif	PKS	Central Java 1	31.205	PKS	
Hj. Ida Nurul Farida, M.Pd.	PKS	Central Java 2	60.048	PKS	
Hafidz Alhaq Fatih, S.T.	PKS	Central Java 5	29.585	PKS	
Dedy Endriyatno, S.E.	PKS	Central Java 6	79.750	PKS	
Martono, S.Pd., M.Si.	PKS	Central Java 7	22.683	PKS	
H. Tugiman, S.P.	PKS	Central Java 8	57.299	PKS	
Amir Masduki, S.Pd.I.	PKS	Central Java 9	22.227	PKS	
Karsono, S.Pd.I.	PKS	Central Java 10	45.995	PKS	
Setya Arinugroho	PKS	Central Java 11	39.317	PKS	4th Deputy Speaker
H. Sururul Fuad	PKS	Central Java 12	50.902	PKS	
Much. Muchlis Ariston, S.T.	PKS	Central Java 13	47.518	PKS	
Drs. Amin Makhsun	PAN	Central Java 10	32.525	Amanat NasDem Solidaritas	
Bintang Romadhon	PAN	Central Java 11	33.979	Amanat NasDem Solidaritas	
Zaki Safrudin Prihatin	PAN	Central Java 12	53.345	Amanat NasDem Solidaritas	
Sofwan Sumadi	PAN	Central Java 13	33.191	Amanat NasDem Solidaritas	
Ardhie Kurniawan, A.Md.	Democratic	Central Java 3	50.409	Demokrat	
Hj. Kartina Sukawati, S.E., M.M.	Democratic	Central Java 4	83.192	Demokrat	
Tri Wanto	Democratic	Central Java 5	56.019	Demokrat	
Asrar, S.E.	Democratic	Central Java 6	51.086	Demokrat	
Kholik Idris, S.E., S.H., M.Si.	Democratic	Central Java 9	90.092	Demokrat	
I Putu Doddy	Democratic	Central Java 10	49.308	Demokrat	
Dr. Agus Wijayanto, S.H., M.Kn.	Democratic	Central Java 11	39.300	Demokrat	
Muhammad Farchan, M.T.	PSI	Central Java 1	15.081	Amanat NasDem Solidaritas	
Antonius Yogo Prabowo	PSI	Central Java 7	28.445	Amanat NasDem Solidaritas	
dr. Sholeha Kurniawati	PPP	Central Java 2	65.043	PPP	
Nurul Furqon, S.E., M.M.	PPP	Central Java 3	60.416	PPP	
M. Ali Wafa	PPP	Central Java 4	78.101	PPP	
Ja’far Shodiq, S.Hum., M.Hum.	PPP	Central Java 10	18.312	PPP	
Muhammad Naryoko, S.Fil.I., M.S.I.	PPP	Central Java 12	23.525	PPP	
Nur Fatwah	PPP	Central Java 13	25.001	PPP	

== See also ==
- Regional House of Representatives
