= Mardiyanto =

Indonesian politician

Mardiyanto ꦩꦂꦢꦶꦪꦤ꧀ꦠ
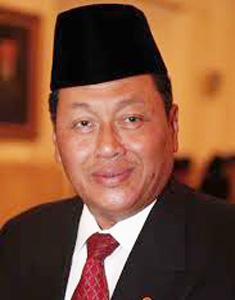
- Mardiyanto in 2007

26th Minister of Home Affairs
- In office 29 August 2007 – 20 October 2009
- President: Susilo Bambang Yudhoyono
- Preceded by: Mohammad Ma'ruf; Widodo Adi Sutjipto (ad-interim)
- Succeeded by: Gamawan Fauzi

12th Governor of Central Java
- In office 24 August 1998 – 28 September 2007
- Deputy: Achmad; Djoko Sudantoko; Mulyadi Widodo; Ali Mufiz
- Preceded by: Soewardi
- Succeeded by: Ali Mufiz

Personal details
- Born: 21 November 1947 (age 78) Surakarta, Central Java, Indonesia
- Party: PDI-P (1998–2004)
- Children: 2
- Education: National Military Academy
- Occupation: Military; Politician
- Cabinet: United Indonesia Cabinet

Military service
- Allegiance: Indonesia
- Branch/service: Indonesian Army
- Years of service: 1970–1998
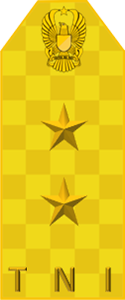
- Rank: Major General
- Unit: Infantry

Mardiyanto (born 21 November 1946 in Surakarta, Central Java) is an Indonesian politician and former general. He was the governor of Central Java beginning in 1998, and was re-elected as a PDI-P party candidate in 2003. He held the position of Minister of Home Affairs until 2009 when he was succeeded by Gamawan Fauzi.

== Gallery ==
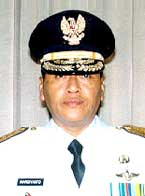
Mardiyanto as Governor of Central Java

Political offices
Preceded by Soewardi	Governor of Central Java; 1998–2007	Succeeded by Ali Mufiz
Preceded by Mohammad Ma'ruf; Widodo Adi Sutjipto (ad interim)	Minister of Home Affairs; 2007–2009	Succeeded by Gamawan Fauzi
