= Bibit Waluyo =

Indonesian politician (born 1949)

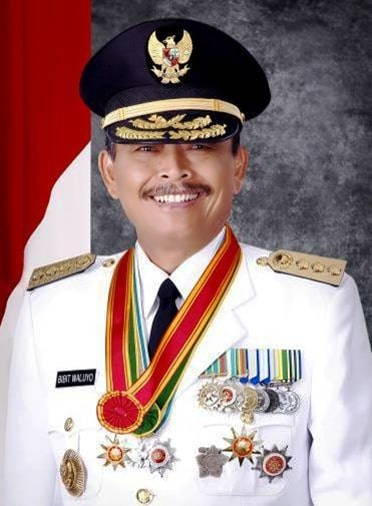
- Official portrait, 2008

14th Governor of Central Java
- In office 23 August 2008 – 23 August 2013
- Deputy: Rustriningsih
- Preceded by: Ali Mufiz
- Succeeded by: Ganjar Pranowo

27th Commander of Army Strategic Reserve Command
- In office 3 July 2002 – 3 November 2004
- President: Susilo Bambang Yudhoyono; Megawati Sukarnoputri
- Preceded by: Lieutenant General Ryamizard Ryacudu
- Succeeded by: Lieutenant General Hadi Waluyo

Personal details
- Born: Bibit Waluyo; 5 August 1949 (age 77) Klaten, Central Java, Indonesia
- Party: Independent
- Other political affiliations: Indonesian Democratic Party of Struggle (2008–2013)
- Education: Indonesian Military Academy

Military service
- Allegiance: Indonesia
- Branch/service: Indonesian Army
- Years of service: 1972–2008
- Rank: General (Honorary)
- Unit: Infantry (Kostrad)

General (Hon.) Bibit Waluyo (born 5 August 1949) is an Indonesian politician and former high-ranking military officer who served as the governor of Central Java from 2008 until 2013, when he was defeated by Ganjar Pranowo. Prior to entering politics, he was an officer in the Indonesian Army, rising to the rank of lieutenant general and going on to hold the command of Kodam Jaya.

== Military career ==
His military career began after graduating from the Army Military Academy in Magelang in 1972. Waluyo's career in the military field gradually began as a Combat Platoon Commander for Kodam II/Bukit Barisan (1973) with the rank of Second Lieutenant. Since then his career has continued to climb and he was given the trust to serve as Commander of the Infantry Battalion 407/Padma Kusuma (1986–1988) which successfully carried out operations in East Timor. He later served as Commander of Kostrad from 3 July 2002 to 3 November 2004.

== Political career ==
Bibit Waluyo and Rustriningsih were officially inaugurated as Governor and Deputy Governor of Central Java on 23 August 2008 by the Minister of Home Affairs Mardiyanto at the Central Java DPRD Building, Jalan Pahlawan, Semarang. He started his career as Governor of Central Java with a program that he launched during the 2008 Gubernatorial Election, namely Bali Ndeso Mbangun Deso or returning to the village and building a village. This program reaps the pros and cons. But on the other hand, this program has succeeded in bringing Central Java into a province that can be self-sufficient in rice in 2012. Bibit Waluyo also has a record of controversies during his reign, including the issue of the rift in his relationship with his deputy Rustriningsih. Bibit also frequently made controversial statements, including his statement insulting the Mayor of Solo, Joko Widodo, as a fool for not giving permission to build the Saripetojo mall, which caused the residents of Solo to forbid him from coming to Solo, as well as his statement in 2012 at an event attended by delegates from other countries who mentioned that the art of kuda lumping is the ugliest art in the world.
