= Taj Yasin Maimoen =

Indonesian politician (born 1983)

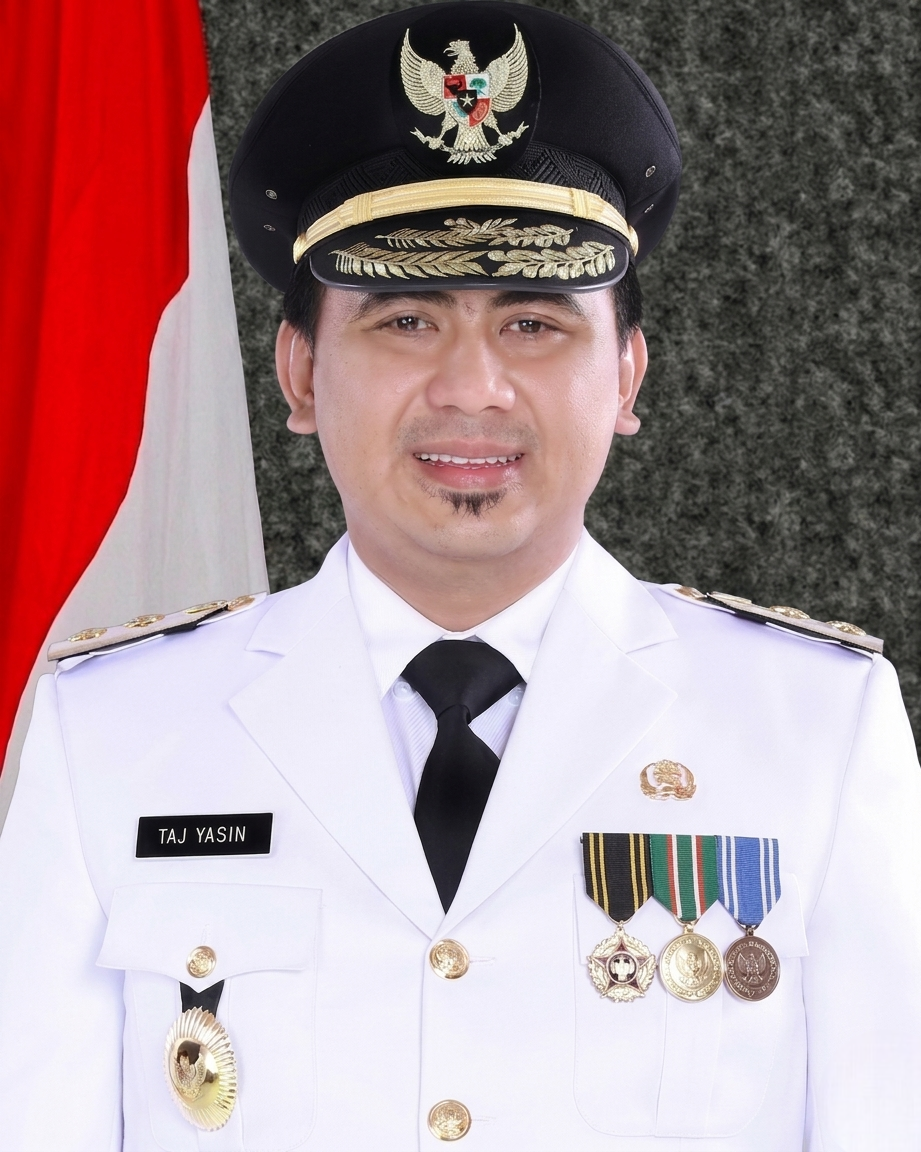
- Taj Yasin Maimoen in 2025

Vice Governor of Central Java
- Incumbent
- Assumed office 20 February 2025
- Governor: Ahmad Luthfi
- Preceded by: Vacant
- In office 5 September 2018 – 5 September 2023
- Governor: Ganjar Pranowo
- Preceded by: Heru Sudjatmoko
- Succeeded by: Vacant

Personal details
- Born: 2 July 1983 (age 43)
- Party: United Development Party
- Parent: Maimun Zubair (father)
- Relatives: Najih Maimun (brother); Rojih Ubab Maimoen (nephew)

Taj Yasin Maimoen (born 2 July 1983) is an Indonesian politician. He has served as vice governor of Central Java since 2025, having previously served from 2018 to 2023. He has served as secretary general of the United Development Party since 2025.
