= Ganjar Pranowo =

Indonesian politician (born 1968)

- Portrait, 2024

15th Governor of Central Java
- In office 23 August 2013 – 5 September 2023
- Vice Governor: Heru Sudjatmoko (2013–2018); Taj Yasin Maimoen (2018–2023)
- Preceded by: Bibit Waluyo; Syarifuddin (acting)
- Succeeded by: Nana Sudjana (acting)

Member of House of Representatives
- In office 1 October 2004 – 23 August 2013
- Preceded by: Constituency established
- Succeeded by: Ida Resmi Nurani
- Constituency: Central Java VII

Personal details
- Born: 28 October 1968 (age 58) Purworejo, Indonesia
- Party: PDI-P
- Spouse: Siti Atiqoh Suprianti (m. 1999)
- Relations: Pri Pambudi Teguh (brother)
- Children: 1 son (Muhammad)
- Education: Gadjah Mada University (S.H.); University of Indonesia (M.I.P.)
- Website: ganjarpranowo.com

Ganjar Pranowo (born 28 October 1968) is an Indonesian politician who served as the governor of Central Java between 2013 and 2023. He is a member of the nationalist Indonesian Democratic Party of Struggle (PDI-P). He was a candidate for president in the 2024 Indonesian presidential elections, running alongside former Chief Justice of the Constitutional Court of Indonesia, Mahfud MD, and coming in third place. Previously, he represented Central Java as a national legislator in the People's Representative Council (DPR) for two terms from 2004 until 2009 and 2009 until 2013. He has been described as a left-wing populist.

== Early life and education ==
Ganjar Pranowo was born Ganjar Sungkowo on 28 October 1968, as the fifth of the six children of a family in a village on the slopes of Mount Lawu, Karanganyar, to S. Pamudji Pramudi Wiryo (1930–2017), a police officer, and Sri Suparni (1940–2015), a homemaker. He had three brothers, Pri Kuntadi, Pri Pambudi Teguh (b. 1961), and Joko Prasetyo, and two sisters, Prasetyowati, and Nur Hidayati. His father took part in counter-insurgency operations, including the crackdown of PRRI rebels. Pamudji was the son of Mangku Wirono who was a son of Danu Wiyono who was a grandson of Kanjeng Raden Tumenggung Mandoyo Nagoro who has a son, Raden Mas Abdullah, which has the same lineage with Sunan Kalijaga. Ganjar's mother owned a grocery shop and selling petrol in front of the shop, and also provided services as a seamstress. She later married Pamudji and had six children, including Ganjar who was the youngest son, and continued to sell petrol with him.

Ganjar's birth name, Ganjar Sungkowo, translates to "reward after troubles/sadness (Sungkowo)". However, when he entered school, his second name was changed to Pranowo because his parents feared that the child would "always wallow in misfortune and trouble" if it remained as Sungkowo. Because of his father's assignments, his family often moved, including to Kutoarjo where Ganjar went for junior high school at SMPN 1 Kutoarjo. For senior high school, he attended a private school in the city of Yogyakarta. In high school, he was active in scouting activities. Towards the end of high school in the late 1980s, his father retired from police service, forcing his mother to open a grocery shop and sell gasoline on the roadside to make ends meet.

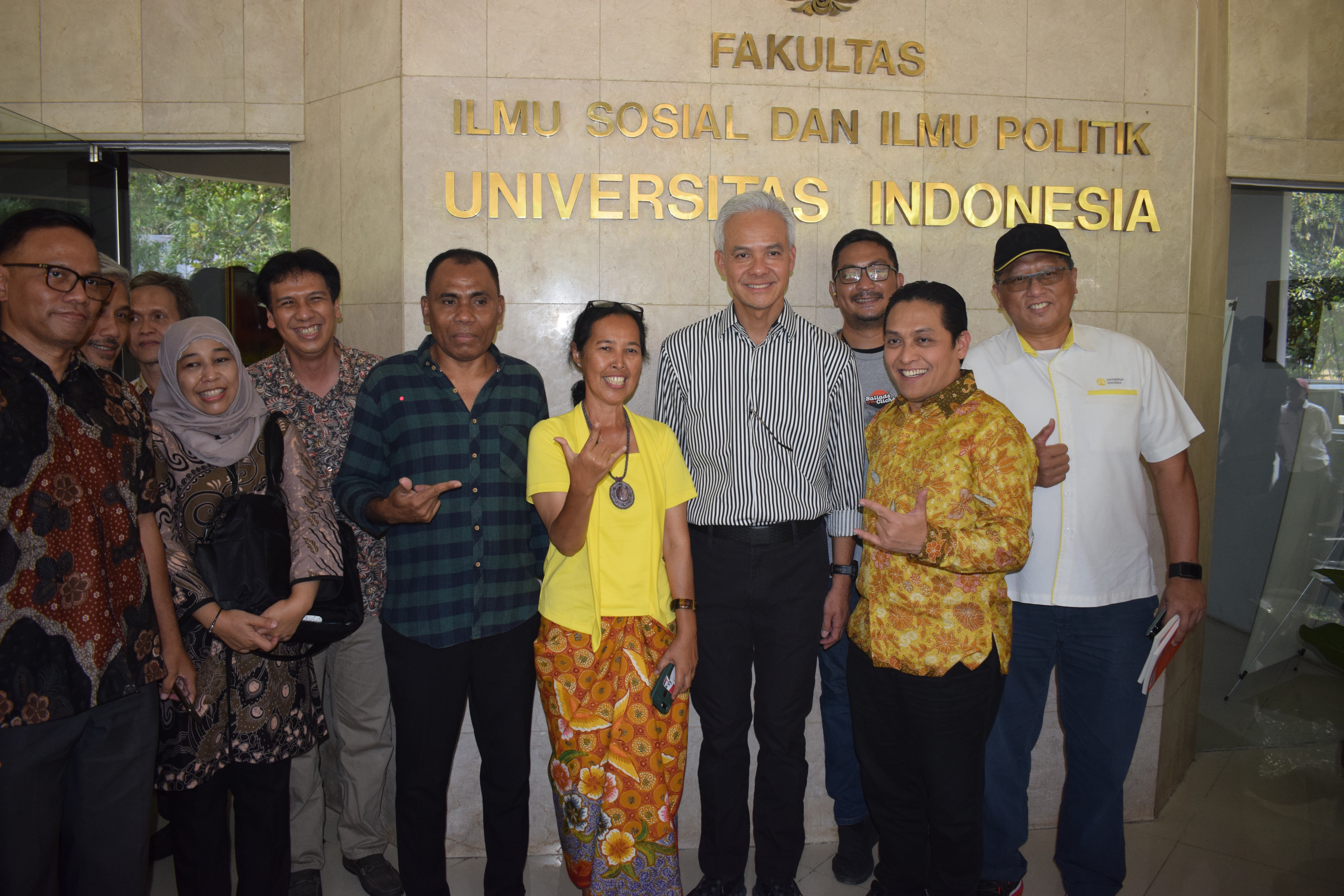
Ganjar Pranowo with classmates from the postgraduate programme

After graduated from high school, he continued his studies at the Faculty of Law at Gadjah Mada University (UGM). During his college years, Ganjar was active in the Indonesian National Student Movement known as Gerakan Mahasiswa Nasional Indonesia (GMNI). He also served as a chairman of the Justicia Student Club (Majestic-55), a nature lovers organization founded by UGM Law Faculty students, from 1988 until 1990.

While studying at UGM, Ganjar had taken two semesters off due to not having the money to pay for tuition. During his leave, he carried out mountain climbing activities and taught high school students about nature science. Ganjar graduated with a law degree in 1994 with his thesis examiner Professor Nindyo Pramono. He was involved in student demonstrations during college and often protested against government, and university policies. Ganjar earned a postgraduate degree from Faculty of Social and Political Sciences at University of Indonesia, graduating in the Political Science Masters program.

== Early career ==
After graduating from Gadjah Mada University, Ganjar relocated to Jakarta to pursue work in oil and gas sector, and working for PT Prakarsa Pramandita as a human resource development consultant officer. He also worked for other companies, including PT Prastawana Karya Samitra and PT Semeru Realindo Inti.

Active in GMNI and admiring Indonesia's founding president Sukarno, Ganjar Pranowo joined the Indonesian Democratic Party (PDI), which was created with a Sukarnoist core, in 1996. The party was then hit by an internal conflict between supporters of Suryadi, who bowed to the authoritarian government of President Suharto, and Sukarno's daughter Megawati Sukarnoputri who rebelled against the political subjugation. She later created a splinter, PDI-P, which complete version means the rebel faction of PDI. Ganjar Pranowo, a passionate Sukarnoist, supported Megawati and the PDI-P resistance, eventually leading him to choose a career in politics. Until the 1998 resignation of Suharto, it was difficult for anti-government politicians to hold onto their day jobs and they were frowned upon. As Ganjar's father was a police officer and his brother was a judge, his political move also troubled his family who worked for the government as Suharto's New Order regime required loyalty from state officials who must support the authoritarian president's Golkar party.

Ganjar Pranowo witnessed firsthand the deadly 27 July 1996 incident when a mob of police officers and soldiers in civilian garb stormed the PDI headquarters. The attack was meant to intimidate and discourage the anti-government movement led by Megawati against Suharto's undemocratic crackdown on political freedom. The experience hardened Ganjar's choice to jump into politics through Megawati's movement. During Trisakti shootings on 12 May 1998, Ganjar visited the campus and witnessed a kid burning a truck in front of the campus. He then helped a journalist who had been shot and said the incident was the moment that resonated most with him regarding the May 1998 riots of Indonesia.

== Legislative career ==
=== Tenure ===
After years of working for the PDI-P consolidation after the 1998 transition to democracy, Ganjar Pranowo in 2004 officially entered public service as a national legislator in Jakarta. The former student protester Pranowo rapidly gained prominence as a politician recognized for his speaking and media appearances.

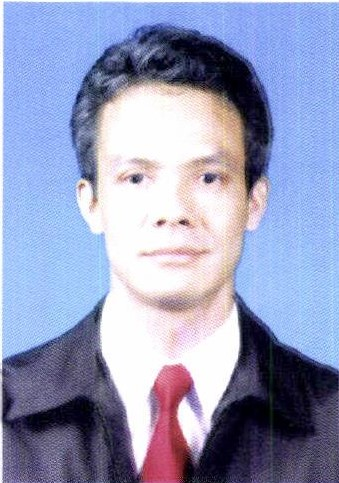
Official portrait of Ganjar Pranowo as a member of the People's Representative Council in 2004

==== First term ====
After receiving advice from fellow professionals who joined the PDI-P movement in the 1990s such as Pramono Anung, who is currently serving as cabinet secretary, and Hasto Kristianto, who is currently PDI-P's secretary general, Ganjar Pranowo decided to run for a People's Representative Council (Dewan Perwakilan Rakyat, DPR) seat in 2004 parliamentary elections. However, he did not win. Fortunately, the PDI-P stalwart who did grab the DPR seat representing his Central Java-7 constituency received an ambassadorship assignment before the 2004 parliament began sitting from Megawati Soekarnoputri, who was president from 2001 to 2004. Megawati Soekarnoputri, as PDI-P chief, then assigned Ganjar to the seat that would become his political springboard.

During his first term as a DPR member from 2004 to 2009, Ganjar Pranowo was assigned to a commission that oversaw agriculture, environment, forestry, and maritime affairs. Due to Megawati's loss in the 2004 presidential elections, PDI-P served as the opposition in Ganjar's first term. This gave him a platform to attack government policies on forestry at a time when the sector was mismanaged and known for the corrupt practices of the department that managed it and shine as an articulate politician. In addition, he was also assigned to lead the Special Committee for the Political Party Bill, giving him more opportunities to show his political skills.

==== Second term ====
With a far higher profile compared to his first race in 2004, Ganjar Pranowo successfully defended his DPR seat in the 2009 elections. During his second tenure, Ganjar Pranowo led the special committee that amended the bill on the roles and functions of legislatures while serving in the commission that supervises issues related to home affairs, local autonomy, public service, bureaucratic reform, elections, land affairs, and agrarian reform all of which gave him more platform to build his reputation. PDI-P continued to be the opposition in the 2009–2014 term, which was a blessing in disguise for an up-and-coming, eloquent politician like Ganjar Pranowo.

When the government was hit by controversies related to the 2008 financial crisis, Ganjar Pranowo stole the limelight. He became known to the public as a member of the Special Inquiry Committee for the Bank Century Bailout for the opposition, giving him opportunities to convey public discontent over government policies for selected banks.

Amid his busy political life, he completed his postgraduate studies at the Faculty of Social and Political Sciences, at the University of Indonesia in 2013. His thesis focused on the independence of the General Elections Commission, specifically the government at the time and two of its governing parties' (Demokrat and PAN) stance on whether representatives of political parties should be allowed on the commission.

== Governor of Central Java ==
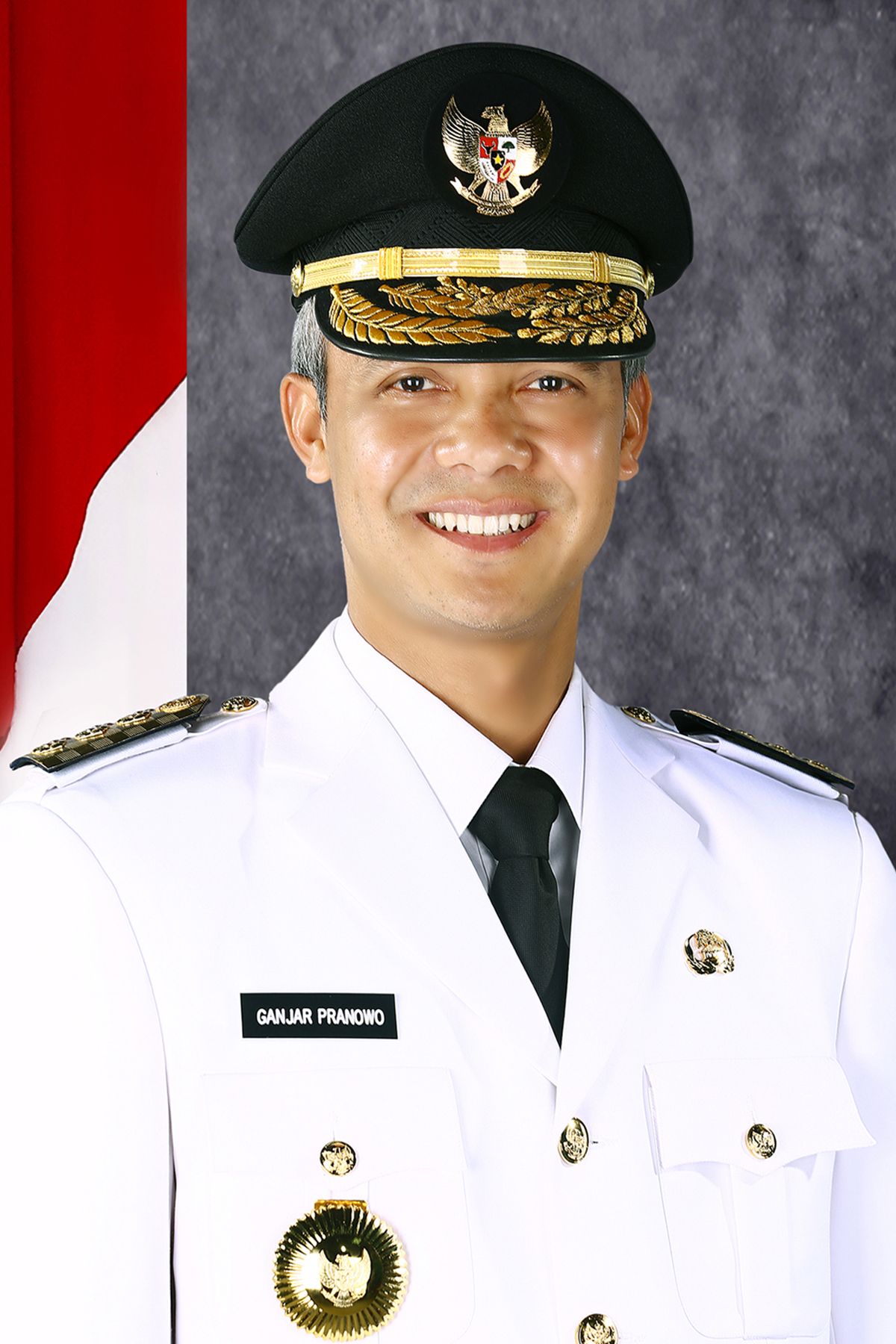
Ganjar Pranowo's first portrait as governor of Central Java (2013)

=== First term ===
After nine years in parliament as a vocal opposition politician, especially in the commission that supervises home affairs, Ganjar Pranowo gained popularity and also insight into regional administration despite his straight jump into national politics. With this modality, he aimed for a return to his home province as its governor. Ganjar Pranowo did not finish his second term in parliament after he won the 2013 Central Java gubernatorial election. He ran an anti-corruption campaign with the slogan "mboten korupsi, mboten ngapusi" (no corruption, no dishonesty) against the incumbent Bibit Waluyo, a former general who was facing graft allegations. Ganjar won the election with a plurality of 48.82% of the vote.

His first term (2013–2018) was marked by his populist efforts in introducing free basic education, building public infrastructure, empowering the province's coffee farmers, and increasing anti-poverty programs. All of which made him well-positioned to defend his position in the 2018 Central Java gubernatorial election.

==== Economic reforms ====
During his leadership as governor, Ganjar Pranowo enacted financing loan reform from Bank Jateng [id] for MSMEs with the KUR Mitra 25 product bearing an interest of 7 percent per year, while Mitra 02 was at 2 percent, without collateral, and administrative fees. When launched, the loan interest was the lowest in Indonesia; now the model is replicated by other local governments throughout the country and has even received attention and appreciation from President Joko Widodo.

Ganjar Pranowo made a breakthrough by requiring all state civil servants (ASN) which numbered more than 40,000 in the Central Java Provincial Government to pay zakat (based on PP No. 14 of 2014, Presidential Instruction No. 3 of 2014, and the appeal of the governor of Central Java Ganjar Pranowo). The income of each ASN is directly deducted by 2.5 percent. Monthly, IDR 1.6 billion is collected which is used for disaster assistance, repair of uninhabitable houses (RTLH), education and Islamic boarding schools, mosques, health sector, and others.

Ganjar lowered the annual interest rate on the provincial microcredit program (KUR) for micro, small and medium-sized enterprises (MSMEs) to 3%, the lowest in the country.

==== Anti-corruption reforms ====
In 2015, the Corruption Eradication Commission awarded the Provincial Government of Central Java, led by Ganjar Pranowo, an award for its consistent reports of corruption and gratification. The recognition came due to Ganjar's dedication in controlling the giving of gratuities to both governors and officials of the Central Java provincial government. Now, the Eid parcel culture doesn't even exist anymore in the Central Java Provincial Government.

==== Other reforms ====
In 2016, Ganjar Pranowo launched a program to form disaster-resilient villages. The target is that by 2018 all of the 2204 disaster-prone villages in Central Java become disaster resilient. Ganjar Pranowo helped form 100 independent villages, mostly in areas that have the potential to become tourist destinations and deliver natural resources for community development.

In the health sector, Ganjar Pranowo has planned the construction of an international standard modern hospital at MAJT (Central Java Grand Mosque). In addition, Ganjar Pranowo also launched the "Jateng Gayeng Nginceng Wong Meteng" program he initiated early during his administration.

Ganjar Pranowo also brought about farmer cards during his administration. These cards contain data on the identity of the farmer, the area of land, the type of plant, and the need for fertilizer. Outside of farmers, no one has access to subsidized fertilizers, thereby eliminating crime and abuse of authority. President Jokowi then appreciated and made the farmer card a national program.

Ganjar has also stepped up efforts to reduce stunting and maternal and infant mortality, and launched a campaign to prevent early marriage, which is widespread in the province.

=== Second term ===
Ganjar Pranowo ran for re-election in 2018 with a strategy of expanding his nationalist-based vote bank by including conservative Muslims through a young running mate from the Islamist United Development Party (PPP) Taj Yasin Maimoen [id]. Yasin Maimoen, who was just 35 in 2018 and a member of the Central Java provincial legislature, is the son of powerful Muslim cleric Maimoen Zubair whose Islamic school influences areas where PDI-P was weak. The Muslim outreach strategy paid off with a 59% victory but it also triggered a drop in the less Islamic areas where PDI-P supporters are based. Ganjar Pranowo even lost against his challenger, former energy minister Sudirman Said in the regency of Purbalingga which he represented as a national legislator.

==== COVID-19 pandemic ====
During the coronavirus pandemic in Indonesia, Ganjar Pranowo said he would prepare a heroes' cemetery for medical personnel who died due to the coronavirus. The statement was in response to the case of residents' rejection of the funeral of a nurse at the Dr. Kariadi Hospital in Semarang who died from the virus. The statement drew criticism; some felt he should have paid more attention to the availability of Personal Protective Equipment (PPE) to protect medical personnel; rather than speaking about graves. For this criticism, Ganjar Pranowo said those who were using the situation to criticise were doing so for political gain.

His second term was marked by his hands-on governance during the COVID-19 pandemic that included him going to the ground often to manage the distribution of medical support and food packages for the affected communities. These populist efforts strengthened his reputation as a pro-people politician and allowed him to become the most electable politician in PDI-P for the 2024 presidential election.

=== Social media use ===
Before and when he was governor of Central Java, Ganjar Pranowo was known to use the social media application Twitter to communicate with the public. During the inauguration of the acting regional head, he asked officials to be active on social media so that they could quickly receive complaints from residents and respond to and find out the latest information from their respective regions. According to Ganjar, through social media, he can listen to input, criticism, and even hear protests from people who do not like his policies in leading Central Java.

== 2024 presidential campaign ==
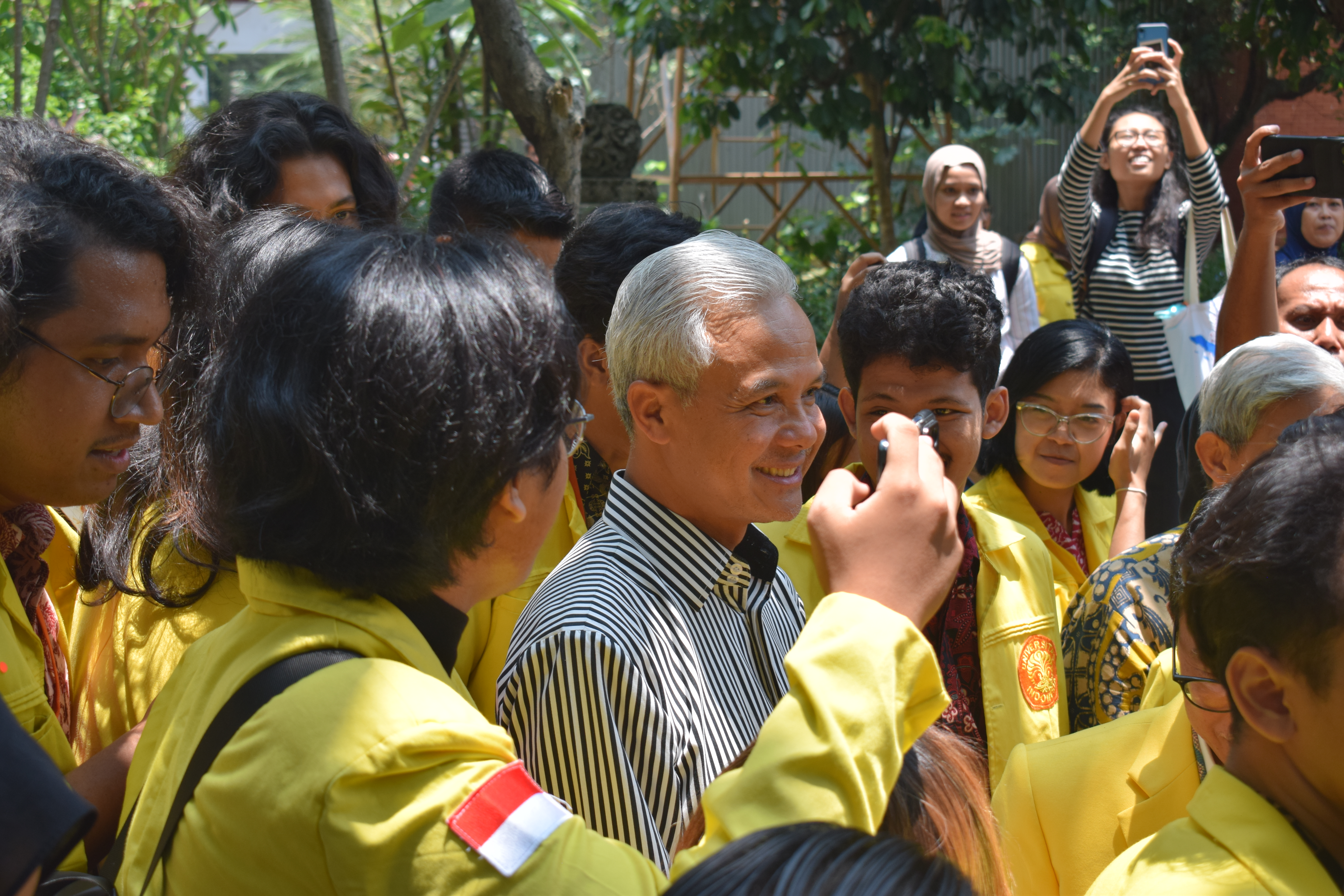
Ganjar Pranowo with students of the University of Indonesia after giving a lecture as a presidential candidate

Ahead of the presidential election in February 2024, Ganjar Pranowo was the subject of media speculation on whether or not he would run for the presidency. In a poll conducted by New Indonesia Research & Consulting, Ganjar Pranowo polled with 20.5%, with the defense minister and 2019 presidential candidate Prabowo Subianto coming in second with 16.7%.

This resulted in rising tensions with Puan Maharani and the chairman of the PDI-P Election Winning Body (Bappilu) Bambang Wuryanto, culminating in 2021, when Ganjar Pranowo was not invited to an important PDIP event in Central Java.

On 19 October 2022, he expressed his possible run for 2024 Indonesian Presidential Election. His unofficial supporters speculated that Megawati Soekarnoputri already gave her consent and approval for him to run for presidency instead of Puan. He was officially announced as PDI-P's candidate on 21 April 2023. He was joined by Mahfud MD, a senior Minister and former Chief Justice of the Constitutional Court of Indonesia, as his running mate in the presidential campaign. Aside from the PDI-P, the pair was also supported by the United Development Party and two non-parliamentary parties, the Perindo Party and the People's Conscience Party (Hanura).

On 19 September, Ganjar was featured on 3 Bacapres Bicara Gagasan episode of Mata Najwa which was broadcast live from Gadjah Mada University. He revealed his seven strategy campaign to eradicate poverty in Indonesia which consists of building human resources, stabilizing basic prices, strengthening social safety nets, downstreaming industry to become world class, increasing the value of infrastructure that has been built by the government, and returning Indonesia's nature to a better state.

Ganjar and Mahfud were defeated by Prabowo Subianto and his running mate Gibran Rakabuming Raka in the election, coming in third with 16% of the vote. Ganjar and the second placed candidate, Anies Baswedan, initially disputed the election results based on allegations of fraud and election violations, including that the sitting president Joko Widodo had intervened in favour of his son, Gibran. After the Constitutional Court of Indonesia rejected these claims, both candidates accepted the results and congratulated Prabowo and Gibran.

== Controversies ==
=== BI fund transfer ===
In his first term in the DPR, Ganjar attracted media coverage because his name was included in a copy of a document that revealed the flow of Bank Indonesia funds to legislators in April 2008. The document was thought to reveal the mode of how the central bank played around with the budget for serving council members. As a result, five non-government organizations reported this to the Corruption Eradication Commission. Ganjar (then a member of the DPR) is mentioned in the document as Ganjar Prastowo. Ganjar confirmed that what Ganjar Prastowo meant in the document was himself and said that at that time he was invited abroad by BI. If the visit is deemed haram, Ganjar is ready to return the money he received. BI also acknowledged the authenticity of the document.

=== E-KTP corruption case ===
Former KPK investigator Novel Baswedan in October 2022 said there was no evidence that Ganjar Pranowo, who at that time was Governor of Central Java, was involved in the e-KTP corruption case. According to him, Ganjar's involvement at that time did not meet the standard of proof. In his podcast, Novel even emphasized that Ganjar was not among the people who received money in the e-KTP corruption case.

Novel stated that there was not enough evidence that Ganjar was involved in the corruption case in the procurement of electronic KTPs (e-KTP). While at the KPK, Novel was involved in handling a case that cost the state up to IDR 2.3 trillion.

On many occasions I have dared to say that the fulfillment of the evidence has not met the standard of proof. Why can I say that? Yes, I am the investigator, I know better.

— Novel Baswedan, on Ganjar Pranowo's involvement in the e-KTP case

KPK Chairman Firli Bahuri said that until now his party had not found evidence of Ganjar's involvement in the alleged corruption case in e-KTP procurement.

Until today we have not found whether there is evidence or not. We cannot name someone as a suspect without evidence

— Firli Bahuri, KPK's Red and White Building, Jakarta, Thursday (28/4)

Muhammad Nazaruddin, former General Treasurer of the Democratic Party, testified as a witness at the follow-up trial of the e-KTP corruption case. In his testimony he was questioned about the disbursement of funds to Ganjar Pranowo. To the judge, Nazar believed that Ganjar received money in the e-KTP procurement project. He even admitted that he saw the money handed over to Ganjar, who at that time was Deputy Chair of Commission II of the DPR. Ganjar later admitted he was offered the bribes, but he refused. Until 2018, the KPK stated that they had no evidence that Ganjar received money in the e-KTP corruption case. Even so, Budiman Sudjatmitko defended Ganjar stating he was not involved. However in 2022, Ganjar was reported to the KPK again for this case.

=== Weighbridge bribes ===
Ganjar Pranowo on 27 April 2014 caught public attention when he expressed his anger at local officers who extorted truckers during a surprise inspection at the Subah weighbridge in Batang Regency. Ganjar said that he saw first-hand several people who gave money to officers to avoid official fines for overweight loads.

The Subah incident resulted in a policy to close the weighbridges in Central Java from May 2014. However, this policy caused Central Java to lose revenue with provincial councilors criticising it as self-harm for the sake of popularity. The weighbridge closure also was not followed by an official evaluation of the duties and functions of government employees at weighbridges. The policy blowback led to a reversal.

=== Semen Indonesia dispute case ===
Ganjar Pranowo became a target of protest from farmers who opposed his environmental permit for the activities of the national cement company Semen Indonesia Group in Rembang Regency through a demonstration in front of the presidential palace in Jakarta. Since 2015, residents have tried to resist the construction of a cement factory in Rembang's Kendeng mountains by taking legal action and holding demonstrations ranging from a camp out at the project site to the symbolic action of cementing their feet in Jakarta.

The community eventually succeeded to limit the activities of the cement factory construction after the Supreme Court on 2 August 2016 issued a judicial review decision that dismissed the environmental permit. Although the court decision prohibited mining and drilling in groundwater basins in the Kendeng mountain area, Ganjar on 9 November 2016, issued a new permit by only changing the name of the company from Semen Gresik to the name of its parent Semen Indonesia. According to him, the court decision did not stop factory construction. Thus, the establishment of the Semen Indonesia factory should continue.

Amid resident insistence that the factory should be shut down after the Supreme Court ruling, Ganjar Pranowo stated that his administration would do so only under the order of the central government. However, the president said the resolution was the responsibility of the province and the central government had no authority to issue permits for cement factories owned by state companies.

Under heavy public pressure, Ganjar Pranowo on 17 January 2017 canceled his previous addendum and decided to postpone the process of establishing the factory in Rembang until a permit decree was issued in adjustment to the Supreme Court decision. However, a new permit with a slight change in the geographical scope of the factory was re-issued on 23 February 2017.

=== Wadas Conflict ===
The Wadas Conflict is a conflict that arose between the residents of Wadas Village, Bener District, Purworejo, Central Java, and the Indonesian Government, in this case the Indonesian National Police and the Indonesian National Army, beginning in 2019. This conflict is based on the government's plan to open open-pit andesite mining in the village area as a source of raw material for the construction of the Bener Dam, which is in the same sub-district as this village area.

According to local people, mining this stone will damage the village environment. On 7 June 2021, Ganjar Pranowo issued Central Java Governor's Decree Number 590/20 of 2021 concerning Updates on the Determination of Land Acquisition Locations for the Construction of the Bener Dam in Purworejo and Wonosobo, Central Java Province. On 15 July 2021, residents of Wadas Village through the Wadas Village Nature Care Movement (Gempadewa) sued the Governor of Central Java, Ganjar Pranowo, at the Semarang State Administrative Court (PTUN) over the issuance of the Governor's Decree regarding the location for land acquisition for the Bener Dam. This demand was rejected by the Semarang PTUN through a decision on 30 August 2021. On 14 September 2021, Wadas residents appealed the decision. Wadas' attorney, Hasrul Buamona, believes that the decision has no legal basis and believes that the panel of judges did not consider aspects of good and healthy living space management.

=== Pornography ===
In a podcast organized by Deddy Corbuzier, Ganjar Pranowo explained that he accidentally shared a pornographic video on his Twitter account. When one of his followers asked why he was watching it, Ganjar Pranowo answered that he had done nothing wrong because he was an adult and already had a wife, and then stated that watching pornographic films for adults was sometimes necessary.

I accidentally pressed [the like button] one day and sent a porn video [to my twitter account]. "Mr Ganjar, why are you watching pornographic films?" However, if I did watch porn, where did I go wrong? I'm already an adult.

— Ganjar Pranowo, in Close the Door Podcast by Deddy Corbuzier

Because of this, Ganjar Pranowo was deemed to have violated the Information and Electronic Transactions Law (UU ITE) for distributing films containing pornographic elements. Regarding this statement, Ganjar recalled his experience of giving a laptop to a student who admitted to watching pornography while visiting a school. Ganjar praised the student for his honesty and described him as a person with leadership potential. "I say, if there are no teachers [to teach that, then] sex education [is] wrong," Pranowo told the student, warning him that pornography should not be used as a guide in his own sex life. When the video got viral, Ganjar asked his critics to watch the full podcast. He also clarifies that he is not a fan of pornography and calling him a "porn addict" is misleading.

Ganjar Pranowo's statement in the interview was criticised by various parties. Sinar Suprabana, a Central Java academic, argued that Pranowo's statements in the interview were unethical and that it was "better for him to keep his mouth shut and take steps to improve himself" than "provide clarification". Muslim cleric Tengku Zulkarnain stated that Ganjar Pranowo could not become a politician because he had watched pornographic films.

=== Boycott of Israel ===
In 2023, Ganjar banned the entry of the Israel national football team to Indonesia during the country's hosting of the 2023 FIFA U-20 World Cup, citing his and the country's historic support for the Palestinian cause, and refused to host the team, which was supposed to play a match in Central Java. As a result, FIFA stripped Indonesia of the right to host the tournament, leading to criticism of Ganjar by football fans. His boycott actions were later praised by some after Israel declared war on Hamas. However according to survey by MIPOS, his polling number dropped significantly after his rejection of hosting the U-20 World Cup, with only 16.2% respondents understand his position and 75.2% disapproving. His rejection is believed to be a factor in why he lost the 2024 presidential election, only gaining below 20% of the vote.

== Personal life ==
Ganjar married Siti Atiqoh Supriyanti, the daughter of Akhmad Musodik and Astuti Supriyadi, on 25 September 1999. Akhmad is a Nahdlatul Ulama leader from Purbalingga, Central Java, and was the son of Hisyam Abdul Karim, the founder of Roudlotus Sholihin Islamic Boarding School in Sokawera Hamlet, Kalijaran Village. They first met in 1994, during Kuliah Kerja Nyata (literally Student Study Service; KKN) at Gadjah Mada University when they are assigned in a same group and then went on a date together by riding a bicycle from Bantul to Pogoh. Their only son, Muhammad Zinedine Alam Ganjar, was born on 14 December 2001 in Semarang. When Atiqoh received a scholarship from the University of Tokyo, Ganjar motivated her to continue her study and then replaced Atiqoh's role in taking care of Alam, who at that time was in kindergarten.

Ganjar's mother, Sri Suparni, was hospitalized at Dr. Sardjito General Hospital, on 26 February 2015, where she died there on the early morning of 28 March from complications at the age of 75. His father, Parmudji, was also hospitalized at the same hospital on 21 February 2017, where he died there on 3 April due to old age and complications at the age of 87.

He is a fan of the association football club Manchester United.

== Honours ==
=== National Honours ===
Indonesia

- Bintang Jasa Utama – 2015
- Satyalancana Pembangunan – 2014
- Satyalancana Wira Karya – 2023
- Satyalancana Karya Bhakti Praja Nugraha – 2015
- Lencana Melati Gerakan Pramuka – 2020

Political offices
Preceded by Bibit Waluyo; Syarifuddin (acting)	Governor of Central Java; 2013–2023	Succeeded by Nana Sudjana (acting)
Party political offices
Preceded by Joko Widodo	Indonesian Democratic Party of Struggle nominee for President of Indonesia; 2024 (lost)	Most recent
