= Mayor of Surakarta =

- Wali Kota Surakarta
- Coat of arms of Surakarta

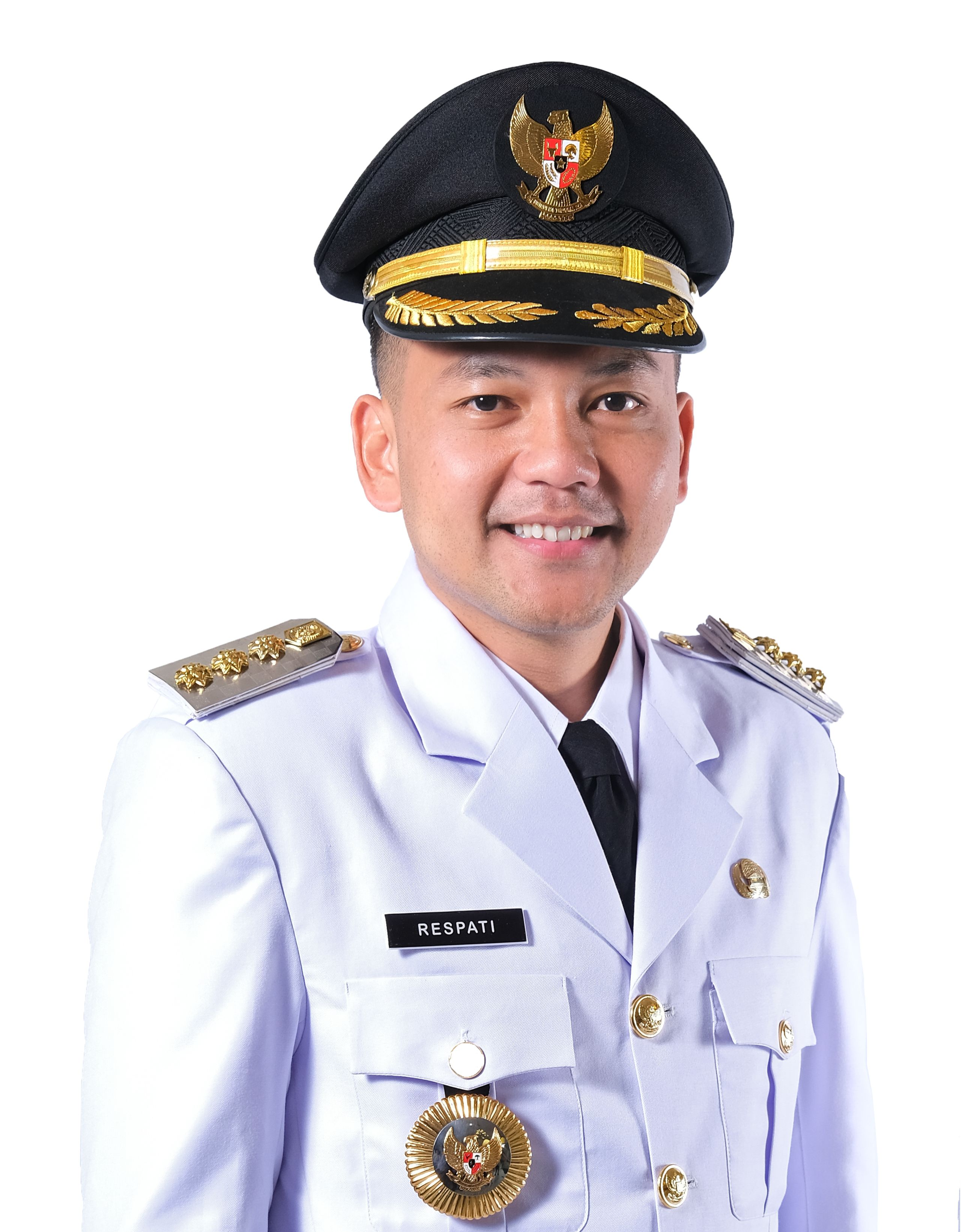
- Incumbent; Respati Achmad Ardianto since 20 February 2025
- Term length: 5 years
- Inaugural holder: R. T. Sindoeredjo
- Formation: 19 May 1946
- Website: www.surakarta.go.id

Mayor of Surakarta is the head of the second-level region who holds the government in Surakarta together with the Vice Mayor and 45 members of the Surakarta City Regional House of Representatives. The mayor and vice mayor of Surakarta are elected through general elections held every 5 years. The first mayor of Surakarta was R. T. Sindoeredjo, who governed the city period from May 1946 to July 1946.

== List ==
The following is a list of the names of the Mayors of Surakarta from time to time.

Mayor of Surakarta
| Num. | Portrait | Mayor | Beginning of office | End of Term | Political Party / Faction | Period | Note. | Vice mayor |
|---|---|---|---|---|---|---|---|---|
| 1 | | R. T. Sindoeredjo | 19 May 1946 | 15 July 1946 | Independent | 1 | (Note: Appointed Mayor of Surakarta by the Indonesian National Committee of the Surakarta City Region. Inaugurated amidst conflict between the Kasunanan Special Region Government and the Mangkunegaran Palace.) | N/A |
| 2 | | Iskak Tjokroadisurjo | 15 July 1946 | 14 November 1946 (Note: Pressured by the struggle bodies, so on 8 October 1946 Iskak resigned and left the city of Surakarta. Iskak and his deputy, Soediro were ordered by the Central Government to return to leadership in accordance with Government Decree Number 21/S.D dated 22 October 1946. On 9 November 1946, he was kidnapped by certain groups.) | PNI | 2 | | Soediro |
| 3 | | Sjamsoeridjal | 14 November 1946 | 13 January 1949 (Note: On 3 October 1949, Sjamsoeridjal together with Secretary Ongko, Head of the Social Service Soeprapto, and Head of the Information Service Soetomo were arrested by Dutch soldiers.) | Masyumi | 3 | (Note: The President and the Minister of Home Affairs were not present at the inauguration, so Sjamsoeridjal inaugurated himself as Mayor and Resident, even though the inauguration could have been carried out by the previous Mayor and Resident.) | N/A |
| 4 | | Soedjatmo Soemowerdojo | 14 January 1949 | 10 July 1949 | ABRI–AD | 4 | | N/A |
| 5 | | Soeharjo Soerjopranoto | 10 July 1949 | 1 May 1950 | ABRI–AD | 5 | | N/A |
| 6 | | K. Ng. Soebekti Poesponoto | 1 May 1950 | 1 August 1951 | Independent | 6 | (Note: Inaugurated simultaneously with the abolition of the Surakarta Residency Military Regional Government based on MBKD Instruction Number 3/ST>d.In/50) | N/A |
| 7 | | Muhammad Saleh Werdisastro | 1 August 1951 | 1 October 1955 | ABRI–AD | 7 (1951) | (Note: Appointed Mayor based on the Decree of the Minister of Home Affairs No. UP14/2/25 and the Decree of the President of the Republic of Indonesia No. 416/16/M) | N/A |
| 7 | | Muhammad Saleh Werdisastro | 1 October 1955 | 17 February 1958 | ABRI–AD | 8 (1955) | | N/A |
| 8 | | Oetomo Ramelan | 17 February 1958 | 10 November 1965 (Note: Temporarily dismissed on 23 October 1965, then dishonorably discharged on 10 November 1965.) | Communist Party of Indonesia | 9 | (Note: Surakarta Municipal Government Period. The enactment of Law Number 1 of 1957 to Law Number 18 of 1965) | N/A |
| 9 | | Raden Koesnandar | 11 January 1968 | 6 November 1973 | ABRI–AD | 10 | | N/A |
| 10 | | Indrijo Jatmo Pranoto | 6 November 1973 | 9 May 1974 | Independent | 11 | | N/A |
| 11 | | Soemari Wongsopawiro | 9 May 1974 | 1980 | Independent | 12 (1975) | | N/A |
| 12 | | Soekatmo Prawirohadisebroto | 1980 | 1985 | Independent | 13 (1980) | | N/A |
| 13 | | H. R. Hartomo | 1985 | 1990 | Independent | 14 (1985) | | N/A |
| 13 | | H. R. Hartomo | 1990 | 1995 | Independent | 15 (1990) | | N/A |
| 14 | | Imam Soetopo | 1995 | 1999 | ABRI–AD | 16 (1995) | | N/A |
| 15 | | Slamet Suryanto | 10 April 2000 | 10 April 2005 | Indonesian Democratic Party of Struggle | 17 (2000) | | J. Suprapto |
| 16 | | Joko Widodo | 28 July 2005 | 28 July 2010 | Indonesian Democratic Party of Struggle | 18 (2005) | | F. X. Hadi Rudyatmo |
| 16 | | Joko Widodo | 28 July 2010 | 1 October 2012 | Indonesian Democratic Party of Struggle | 19 (2010) | (Note: Mayor Joko Widodo resigned after being elected as Governor of DKI Jakarta) | F. X. Hadi Rudyatmo |
| 17 | | F.X. Hadi Rudyatmo | 19 October 2012 | 28 July 2015 | Indonesian Democratic Party of Struggle | 19 (2010) | | Achmad Purnomo (2013–2021) |
| 17 | | F.X. Hadi Rudyatmo | 17 February 2016 | 17 February 2021 | Indonesian Democratic Party of Struggle | 20 (2015) | | Achmad Purnomo (2013–2021) |
| 18 | | Gibran Rakabuming Raka | 26 February 2021 | 19 July 2024 | Indonesian Democratic Party of Struggle | 21 (2020) | (Note: The first mayor who is still guarded by the Presidential Security Forces because he is part of the presidential family.) | Teguh Prakosa |
| 18 | | Gibran Rakabuming Raka | 26 February 2021 | 19 July 2024 | Independent (2023–2024) | 21 (2020) | (Note: Resigned, regarding his status as Vice President-elect) | Teguh Prakosa |
| 19 | | Teguh Prakosa | 19 July 2024 | 20 February 2025 | Indonesian Democratic Party of Struggle | 21 (2020) | | N/A |
| 20 | | Respati Achmad Ardianto | 20 February 2025 | Incumbent | Gerindra | 22 (2024) | | Astrid Widayani |

Information

== Temporary replacement ==
In the government stack, a regional head who submits himself to leave or temporarily resigns from his position to the central government, then the Minister of Home Affairs prepares a replacement who is a bureaucrat in the regional government or even a vice mayor, including when the mayor's position is in a transition period.

| Portrait | Mayor | Party | Beginning | End | Duration | Period | Definitive | Ref. |
|---|---|---|---|---|---|---|---|---|
| | Th. J. Soemantha (Acting) | ABRI–AD | 25 October 1965 | 11 January 1968 | 2 years, 78 days | 9 | Oetomo Ramelan | (Note: Inaugurated based on the Decree of the Minister of Home Affairs Number UP.47/3/20-1534 and followed by the Order Letter Number PRINT-853/10/1965 dated 25 October 1965 from the Commander of the VII/Diponegoro Military Command which contained the assignment as Mayor of the Surakarta Municipality to temporarily replace Oetomo Ramelan who was involved in the September 30th Movement.) |
| | Tedjo Suminto (Acting) | Independent | 1999 | 10 April 2000 | 0–1 years | — | Transition | |
| | Anwar Cholil (Acting) | Independent | 11 April 2005 | 28 July 2005 | 108 days | – | Transition | |
| | F. X. Hadi Rudyatmo (Acting Officer) | Indonesian Democratic Party of Struggle | 1 October 2012 | 19 October 2012 | 18 days | 19 (2010) | | Joko Widodo |
| | Budi Suharto (Acting) | Independent | 5 August 2015 | 30 December 2015 | 148 days | — | Transition | (Note: Died in office.) |
| | Budi Yulistianto (Acting) | Independent | 31 December 2015 | 17 February 2016 | 48 days | — | Transition | |
| | Ahyani (Daily Executive) | Independent | 17 February 2021 | 26 February 2021 | 9 days | — | Transition | |
| | Dhoni Widianto (Acting) | Independent | 24 September 2024 | 23 November 2024 | 60 days | 21 (2020) | Teguh Prakosa | (Note: Incumbent Mayor Teguh Prakosa is on campaign leave for the 2024 Surakarta mayoral election from 25 September 2024 to 23 November 2024, the position of interim mayor is held by Acting Mayor Dhoni Widianto) |

Information

== See also ==
- Surakarta
- List of incumbent regional heads and deputy regional heads in Central Java
