= Opinion polling for the 2029 Indonesian presidential election =

This page lists public opinion polls conducted for the 2029 Indonesian presidential election. Incumbent president Prabowo Subianto is eligible to run for a second term.

== Open ==
=== National polls ===
==== 2026 ====
Pollster	Fieldwork date	Sample size	Margin of error									Other candidates	Unsure	Lead
Pollster	Fieldwork date	Sample size	Margin of error	Prabowo Subianto Gerindra	Anies Baswedan Independent	Ganjar Pranowo PDI-P	Gibran Rakabuming Independent	Agus Yudhoyono Demokrat	Dedi Mulyadi Gerindra	Purbaya Yudhi Sadewa Independent	Sherly Tjoanda Independent	Other candidates	Unsure	Lead
Indonesia Political Opinion	12–20 October 2026	1,200	±2.9% pp	18.4	12.6	4.5	3.1	1.9	32.0	—N/a	1.0	6.4	20.1	Dedi +13.6
SMRC	1–10 October 2026	1,213	±2.9% pp	9.8	10.3	5.0	8.4	2.1	35.5	5.0	1.8	8.1 (Note: Mahfud MD (1.7) * Kaesang Pangarep (1.2) * Pramono Anung (1.0) * Erick Thohir (0.9) * Khofifah Indar Parawansa (0.8) * Andi Amran Sulaiman (0.5) * Susi Pudjiastuti (0.5) * Andika Perkasa (0.3) * Surya Paloh (0.3) * Muhaimin Iskandar (0.2) * Ahmad Luthfi (0.2) * Bahlil Lahadalia (0.2) * Others (0.3))	13.9	Dedi +25.2
Parameter Politik Indonesia	26 September–6 October 2026	1,200	±2.83% pp	31.6	10.1	4.4	6.9	2.3	11.4	0.8	1.1	5.9	25.5	Prabowo +20.2
Tempo Data Science	31 July–11 August 2026	1,260	±2.9% pp	15.0	10.0	4.0	6.0	3.0	42.0	—N/a	4.0	2.0 (Note: Mahfud MD (2.0))	14.0	Dedi +27.0
Median	21 July–2 August 2026	1,212	±2.76% pp	32.4	20.5	5.0	2.6	2.0	20.6	0.8	4.1	7.7 (Note: Mahfud MD (2.1) * Andika Perkasa (1.5) * Basuki Tjahaja Purnama (1.2) * Erick Thohir (1.0) * Sandiaga Uno (0.5) * Kaesang Pangarep (0.5) * Almuzzammil Yusuf (0.3) * Pramono Anung (0.2) * Bahlil Lahadalia (0.2) * Anis Matta (0.2))	4.5	Prabowo +11.8
Indonesia Political Opinion	27 July–3 August 2026	1,200	±2.9% pp	19.0	12.7	4.6	5.1	5.8	29.5	1.5	3.5	6.9	11.4	Dedi +10.5
SMRC	5–19 July 2026	749	±3.7% pp	14.5	8.2	4.2	7.7	4.9	35.0	1.1	1.2	10.3 (Note: Mahfud MD (4.0) * Puan Maharani (1.3) * Surya Paloh (1.0) * Other candidates, each <1% (4.0))	12.8	Dedi +20.5
SMRC	February–March 2026	—N/a	—N/a	33.3	10.8	—N/a	6.8	—N/a	23.3	—N/a	—N/a	18.9 (Note: Includes Ganjar Pranowo, Agus Harimurti Yudhoyono, Basuki Tjahaja Purnama, Purbaya Yudhi Sadewa, Puan Maharani, Sherly Tjoanda, and other candidates; individual figures for this wave were not broken out in SMRC's July 2026 trend chart.)	6.9	Prabowo +10.0
Poltracking	2–8 March 2026	1,220	±2.9% pp	32.9	9.2	2.6	4.2	1.9	13.5	0.8	—N/a	6.1 (Note: Basuki Tjahaja Purnama (0.5))	28.8	Prabowo +19.4
Indonesian Public Institute	30 January–5 February 2026	1,241	±2.78 pp	22.3	8.5	9.0	12.2	1.9	7.9	4.9	3.8	29.5 (Note: Pramono Anung (7.8) * Sjafrie Sjamsoeddin (7.5) * Puan Maharani (5.0) * Muzakir Manaf (3.1) * Sandiaga Uno (3.0) * Ridwan Kamil (1.6) * Other candidates (1.5))	—N/a	Prabowo +10.1
Indekstat	11–25 January 2026	1,200	±2.9 pp	48.9	10.1	3.4	3.7	0.9	16.9	4.4	—N/a	4.3 (Note: Basuki Tjahaja Purnama (2.3))	7.4	Prabowo +32.0

==== 2025 ====
Pollster	Fieldwork date	Sample size	Margin of error									Other candidates (Note: Included Muhaimin Iskandar and Mahfud MD in several polls, who were former running mates for the respective candidates Anies Baswedan and Ganjar Pranowo.)	Unsure	Lead
Pollster	Fieldwork date	Sample size	Margin of error	Prabowo Subianto Gerindra	Anies Baswedan Independent	Ganjar Pranowo PDI-P	Gibran Rakabuming Independent	Agus Yudhoyono Demokrat	Erick Thohir Independent	Dedi Mulyadi Gerindra	Purbaya Yudhi Sadewa Independent	Other candidates	Unsure	Lead
SMRC	November 2025 (Note: Conducted by telephone, unlike the mixed phone/face-to-face method used in the February–March 2026 and July 2026 polls.)	—N/a	—N/a	34.9	6.1	—N/a	5.1	—N/a	—N/a	19.7	—N/a	16.9 (Note: Includes Ganjar Pranowo, Agus Harimurti Yudhoyono, Basuki Tjahaja Purnama, Purbaya Yudhi Sadewa, Puan Maharani, Sherly Tjoanda, and other candidates; individual figures for this wave were not broken out in SMRC's July 2026 trend chart.)	17.3	Prabowo +15.2
Indikator	20–27 October 2025	1,220	±2.9 pp	46.7	9.0	3.7	4.8	3.9	0.4	18.4	1.5	4.0	7.6	Prabowo +28.3
Poltracking	3–10 October 2025	1,220	±2.9 pp	48.5	6.3	2.0	4.9	1.8	0.1	15.7	—N/a	3.0	17.7	Prabowo +32.8
Index Politica	1–10 October 2025	1,610	±1.6 pp	40.1	13.4	7.1	4.8	5.1	1.1	2.5	22.5	0.2	3.1	Prabowo +17.6
LSI	20–28 January 2025	1,220	±2.9 pp	69.4	8.2	2.2	6.4	3.1	0.5	1.0	—N/a	4.9	4.3	Prabowo +61.2
Indikator	16–21 January 2025	1,220	±2.9 pp	68.9	8.6	5.9	3.8	3.1	1.3	—N/a	—N/a	2.3	6.1	Prabowo +60.3
2024 election	14 February 2024	—N/a	—N/a	58.6	24.9	16.5	Running as Prabowo's running mate	Did not participate (Note: Except for Muhaimin Iskandar and Mahfud MD (who included in several polls) who were running mates for the respective candidates Anies Baswedan and Ganjar Pranowo.)					—N/a	Prabowo +33.7

=== Provincial polls ===
==== West Java ====
Pollster	Fieldwork date	Sample size	Margin of error				Other candidates & unsure
Pollster	Fieldwork date	Sample size	Margin of error	Prabowo Subianto Gerindra	Anies Baswedan Independent	Dedi Mulyadi Gerindra	Other candidates & unsure
Litbang Kompas	1–5 July 2025	400	±4.9 pp	36.9	10.1	30.3	22.7

== First round before candidate nominations ==
=== Prabowo vs. Gibran vs. AHY ===
Pollster	Fieldwork date	Sample size	Margin of error				Unsure
Pollster	Fieldwork date	Sample size	Margin of error	Prabowo Subianto Gerindra	Gibran Rakabuming Independent	Agus Yudhoyono Demokrat	Unsure
SMRC	1–10 October 2026	1,213	±2.9% pp	22.7	29.7	28.2	19.4

=== Prabowo vs. Anies vs. Gibran ===
Pollster	Fieldwork date	Sample size	Margin of error				Unsure
Pollster	Fieldwork date	Sample size	Margin of error	Prabowo Subianto Gerindra	Anies Baswedan Independent	Gibran Rakabuming Independent	Unsure
Indikator	20–27 October 2025	1,220	±2.9 pp	68.4	14.3	9.8	7.5
Poltracking	3–10 October 2025	1,220	±2.9 pp	59.1	9.9	7.5	23.5

== Second round before candidate nominations ==
=== Prabowo vs. Dedi ===
Pollster	Fieldwork date	Sample size	Margin of error			Unsure
Pollster	Fieldwork date	Sample size	Margin of error	Prabowo Subianto Gerindra	Dedi Mulyadi Gerindra	Unsure
SMRC	1–10 October 2026	1,213	±2.9 pp	18.8	69.3	12.0
SMRC	5–19 July 2026	749	±3.7 pp	28.3	59.0	12.7
SMRC	February – March 2026	—N/a	—N/a	50.5	42.6	6.9

=== Prabowo vs. Anies ===
Pollster	Fieldwork date	Sample size	Margin of error			Unsure
Pollster	Fieldwork date	Sample size	Margin of error	Prabowo Subianto Gerindra	Anies Baswedan Independent	Unsure
Poltracking	3–10 October 2025	1,220	±2.9 pp	65.1	10.3	24.6

=== Prabowo vs. Gibran ===
Pollster	Fieldwork date	Sample size	Margin of error			Unsure
Pollster	Fieldwork date	Sample size	Margin of error	Prabowo Subianto Gerindra	Gibran Rakabuming Independent	Unsure
Poltracking	3–10 October 2025	1,220	±2.9 pp	65.8	8.1	26.1

== Government approval polls ==
Pollster	Fieldwork date	Link	Approve	Disapprove	Unsure/ Neither	Margin of error	Sample size	Net approval
Indonesia Political Opinion	12–20 October 2026		66	34	0	±2.9 pp	1,200	32
SMRC	1–10 October 2026		44.5	53.4	2.1	±2.9 pp	1,213	8.9
Poltracking	30 September–7 October 2026		55.3	40.9	3.8	±2.9 pp	1,220	14.4
Parameter Politik Indonesia	26 September–6 October 2026		65.4	32.5	2.1	±2.83 pp	1,200	32.9
Celios (Note: Citizen poll)	15 September–9 October 2026		47	53	—N/a	—N/a	1,142	6
Poltracking	14–20 August 2026		55.1	40.2	4.7	±2.9 pp	1,220	14.9
Tempo Data Science	31 July–11 August 2026		37	62	1	±2.9 pp	1,260	25
Median	21 July–2 August 2026		56.2	36.0	7.8	±2.76 pp	1,212	20.2
Indonesia Political Opinion	27 July–3 August 2026		63	35	2	±2.9 pp	1,200	28
SMRC	5–19 July 2026		51.1	46.9	2.1	±3.7 pp	749	4.2
Poltracking	11–17 May 2026		72.2	25.1	2.7	±2.9 pp	1,220	47.1
Median	30 March–7 April 2026		71.8	23.7	4.5	—N/a	1,300	48.1
Poltracking	2–8 March 2026		74.1	24.1	1.8	±2.9 pp	1,220	50.0
SMRC	26 February–5 March 2026		66.4	31.7	1.9	—N/a	—N/a	34.7
Indikator	15–21 January 2026		79.9	19.3	0.8	±2.9 pp	1,220	60.6
Indekstat	11–25 January 2026		79.2	16.8	4.0	±2.9 pp	1,200	62.4
Median	9–13 January 2026		54.5	41.3	4.2	—N/a	1,000	13.2
SMRC	November 2025 (Note: Conducted by telephone.)		81.2	16.0	2.8	—N/a	—N/a	65.2
Indikator	20–27 October 2025		77.7	20.8	1.5	±2.9 pp	1,220	56.9
Pusat Riset Indonesia	10–20 October 2025		82.4	14.2	3.4	±2.9 pp	1,200	68.2
LSI Denny JA	10–19 October 2025		74.8	22.8	2.4	±2.9 pp	1,200	52.0
Indonesia Political Opinion	9–17 October 2025		86	14	—N/a	±2.9 pp	1,200	72
Rumah Politik Indonesia	9–16 October 2025		86.4	12.7	0.9	±3.0 pp	1,200	73.7
Indeks Politica Indonesia	5–12 October 2025		80.2	15.2	4.6	±3.0 pp	1,220	65.0
Poltracking	3–10 October 2025		78.1	19.3	2.6	±2.9 pp	1,220	58.8
Indonesian Social Survey	11–20 July 2025		78.0	16.1	5.9	±2.5 pp	2,200	61.9
LSI Denny JA	16–31 May 2025		81.2	18.3	0.5	±2.9 pp	1,200	62.9
KedaiKOPI	23–29 January 2025		72.5	27.5	—N/a	—N/a	1,201	45.0
Index Politica	22–29 January 2025		87.5	12.1	0.4	±3.0 pp	1,200	75.4
LSI	20–28 January 2025		81.4	15.5	3.1	±2.9 pp	1,220	65.9
Indikator	16–21 January 2025		79.3	16.9	3.8	±2.9 pp	1,220	62.4
Litbang Kompas	4–10 January 2025		80.9	19.1	—N/a	±3.1 pp	1,000	61.8
