= Respati Ardi =

Indonesian politician and businessman

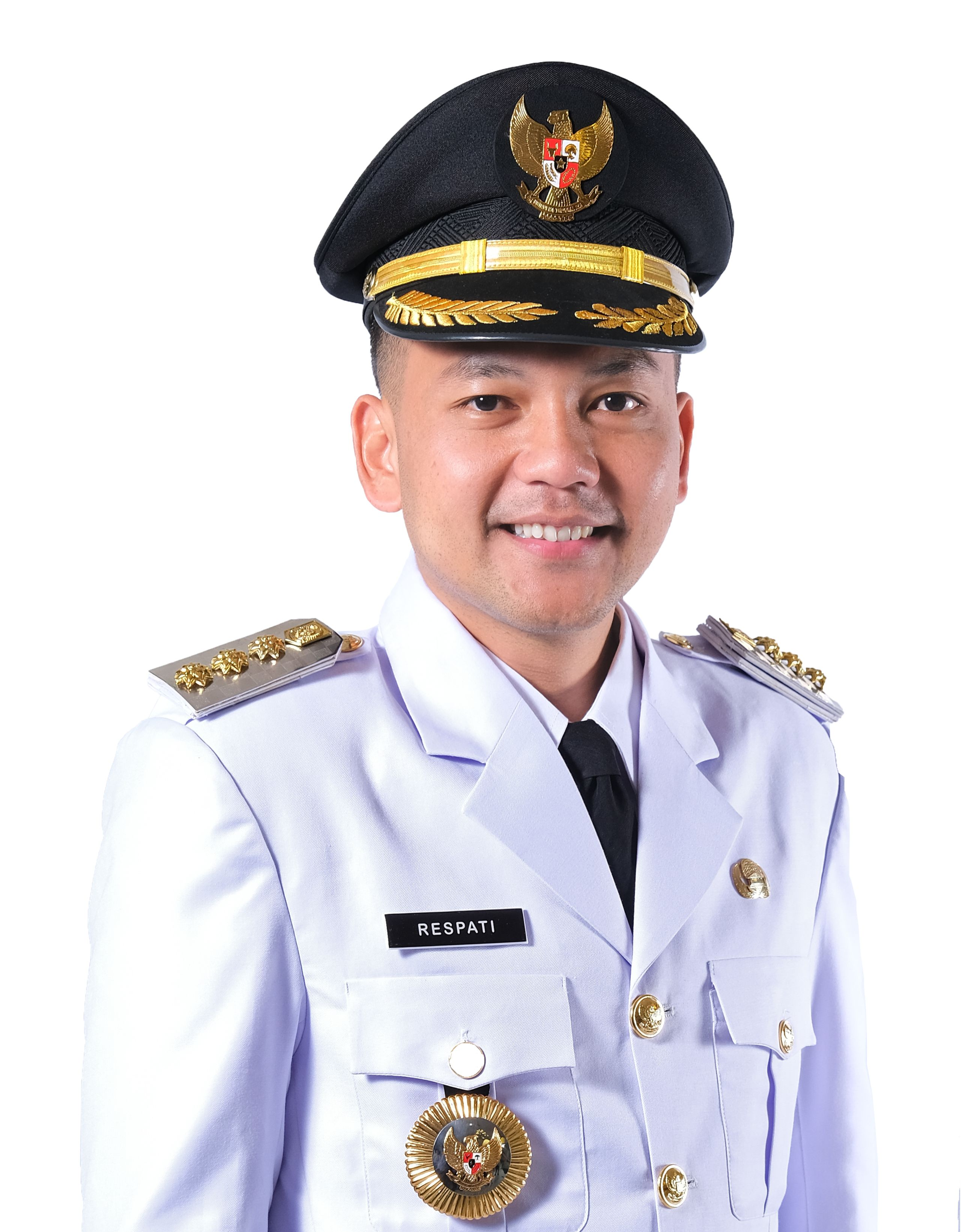
- Portrait as mayor, 2025

20th Mayor of Surakarta
- Incumbent
- Assumed office 20 February 2025
- Governor: Ahmad Luthfi
- Deputy: Astrid Widayani
- Preceded by: Teguh Prakosa

Personal details
- Born: Respati Achmad Ardianto; 31 March 1988 (age 38) Surakarta, Central Java, Indonesia
- Party: Gerindra
- Spouse: Venessa Winastesia
- Children: 3

Respati Achmad Ardianto (born 31 March 1988), also known as Respati Ardi, is an Indonesian politician and businessman who has served as the mayor of Surakarta, Central Java, since February 2025. Born and mostly educated in Surakarta, he became an entrepreneur based there, and was elected mayor in the city's 2024 election.

== Early life ==
Respati Achmad Ardianto was born on 31 March 1988 in Surakarta. He spent his childhood in Surakarta, completing elementary, middle (graduated 2003), and high school (graduated 2006) at public schools within the city. He then studied law at Sebelas Maret University, also in Surakarta, receiving his bachelor's in 2011 before moving to Yogyakarta's Gadjah Mada University where he received a master's degree in notarial law in 2014.

== Career ==
After completing his studies, Respati took on an internship at a notary's firm in Bekasi, and joined a law office. He then became an entrepreneur, co-founding a used cooking oil exporting company and working in real estate development. Respati also became chairman of Surakarta's branch of the Indonesian Young Entrepreneurs' Association.

=== Politics ===
By August 2024, with Surakarta's mayoral election approaching, a coalition of political parties led by Gerindra had announced their support for Mangkunegara X. However, when Mangkunegara X abruptly withdrew his candidacy, the parties instead endorsed Respati. Respati was previously not considered a potential candidate, and his name emerged from discussions between Mangkunegara X and Vice President Gibran Rakabuming Raka (formerly mayor of Surakarta). Respati had previously publicly defended Gibran during the leadup to the 2024 Indonesian presidential election, when Gibran's young age became an issue in his candidacy.

Respati's candidacy, announced just hours after Mangkunegara X's withdrawal and one day before the official registration deadline, was endorsed by former President (and also former mayor of Surakarta) Joko Widodo, and was endorsed by eleven political parties. In the election, Respati and his running mate Astrid Widayani defeated incumbent PDI-P mayor Teguh Prakosa after winning 185,970 votes (60.49%). He was sworn in as the city's 20th mayor on 20 February 2025, ending PDI-P's hold on the city's mayoralship since 2000.

As mayor, Respati sent 60 psychiatrists to Solo's public health clinics to provide supplementary mental health services. Responding to unemployment within the city and the #KaburAjaDulu social media trend in 2025, he announced training programs aimed at preparing unemployed Surakarta residents to find work abroad. Following damage to property caused by protests in August 2025, Respati announced incentive payouts to merchants and motorcycle taxi drivers normally operating in affected areas.

He is a member of the Gerindra party, serving as treasurer of the party's Surakarta branch as of April 2025.

== Personal life ==
Respati is married to Venessa Winastesia, who owns a Batik store, and the couple has two daughters and a son.
