= 2024 Surakarta mayoral election =

- 27 November 2024
- Turnout: 73.84%
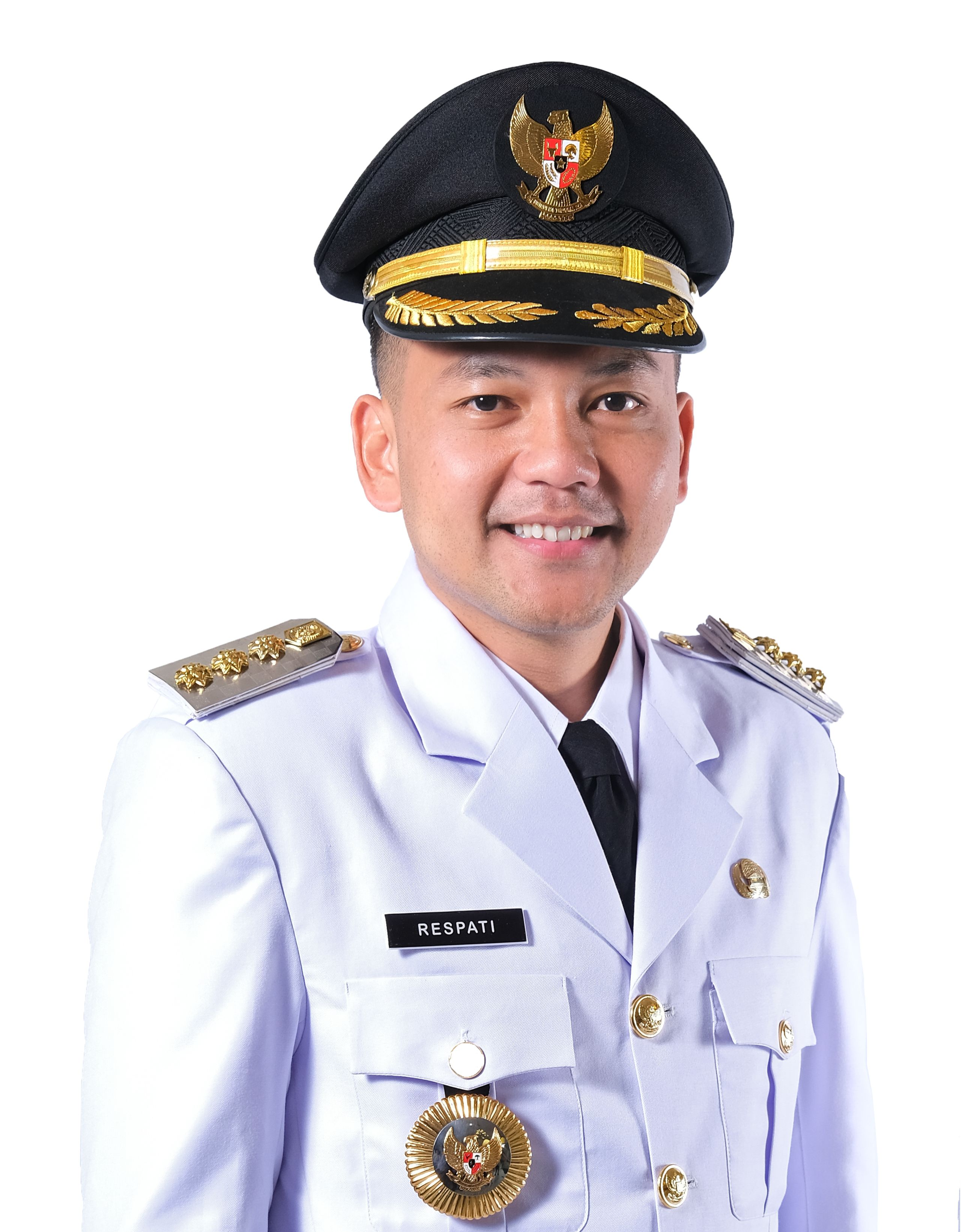

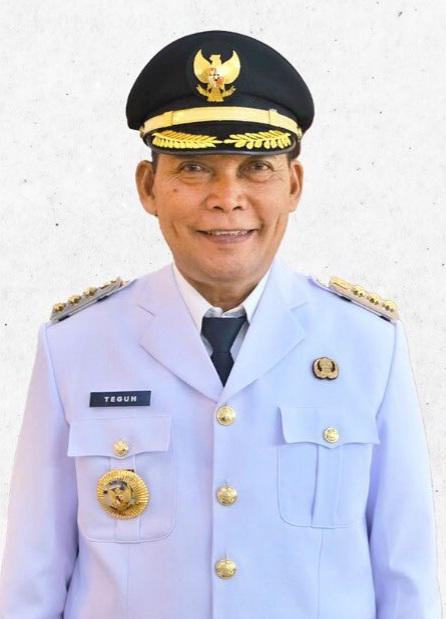
Candidate	Respati Ardi	Teguh Prakosa
Party	Gerindra	PDI-P
Running mate	Astrid Widayani	Bambang Nugroho
Popular vote	185,970	121,471
Percentage	60.49%	39.51%
- Results by district and subdistrict (Interactive version)
Mayor before election
Teguh Prakosa
PDI-P
Elected mayor
Respati Ardi
Gerindra

The 2024 Surakarta mayoral election was held on 27 November 2024 as part of nationwide local elections to elect the mayor and vice mayor of Surakarta, Central Java for a five-year term. The previous election was held in 2020. Respati Ardi of the Gerindra Party won the election in a landslide, securing 60% of the vote. He defeated incumbent mayor Teguh Prakosa of the Indonesian Democratic Party of Struggle (PDI-P), who received 39%.

== Electoral system ==
The election, like other local elections in 2024, follow the first-past-the-post system where the candidate with the most votes wins the election, even if they do not win a majority. It is possible for a candidate to run uncontested, in which case the candidate is still required to win a majority of votes "against" an "empty box" option. Should the candidate fail to do so, the election will be repeated on a later date.

== Candidates ==
According to electoral regulations, in order to qualify for the election, candidates were required to secure support from a political party or a coalition of parties controlling 9 seats (20 percent of all seats) in the Surakarta Regional House of Representatives (DPRD). Candidates may alternatively demonstrate support to run as an independent in form of photocopies of identity cards, which in Surakarta's case corresponds to 37,316 copies. No independent candidates registered for the election within the deadline set by the General Elections Commission (KPU).

The previous elected mayor, Gibran Rakabuming Raka, was elected Vice President of Indonesia in the 2024 presidential election, and was not a candidate in the election.

=== Official ===
Candidate from Gerindra and Independent
Respati Ardi	Astrid Widayani
for Mayor	for Vice Mayor
Chairman of HIPMI Surakarta (2023-2026)	Chancellor of Surakarta University (2023-2027)
Parties
25 / 45 (56%) PKS (7 seats); PAN (3 seats); Golkar (3 seats); Gerindra (5 seats); PSI (5 seats); PKB (2 seats)

Candidate from PDI-P
Teguh Prakosa	Bambang Gage
for Mayor	for Vice Mayor
Mayor of Surakarta (2024–2025)	Cadre of PDI-P Surakarta
Parties
20 / 45 (44%) PDI-P (20 seats)

=== Potential ===
The following are individuals who have either been publicly mentioned as a potential candidate by a political party in the DPRD, publicly declared their candidacy with press coverage, or considered as a potential candidate by media outlets:

- Anna Budiarti (PDI-P), member of the Surakarta DPRD.
- Astrid Widayani, chancellor of Surakarta University.
- Kevin Fabiano (PDI-P), chairman of PDI-P's youth wing in Surakarta.
- Teguh Prakosa (PDI-P), incumbent mayor.

=== Declined ===
The following are individuals mentioned as potential candidate.:

- Mangkunegara X, Duke of Mangkunegaran.
- Sekar Tandjung (Golkar), chairwoman of Golkar Surakarta branch and daughter of former Speaker of the House of Representatives Akbar Tandjung.

== Political map ==
Following the 2024 Indonesian legislative election, seven political parties are represented in the Surakarta DPRD:

Political parties	Seat count
Indonesian Democratic Party of Struggle (PDI-P)	20 / 45
Prosperous Justice Party (PKS)	7 / 45
Indonesian Solidarity Party (PSI)	5 / 45
Great Indonesia Movement Party (Gerindra)	5 / 45
Party of Functional Groups (Golkar)	3 / 45
National Mandate Party (PAN)	3 / 45
National Awakening Party (PKB)	2 / 45

== Opinion polls ==
=== Pre-election polls ===
Poll source	Date	Sample size					Lead	Error margin
Poll source	Date	Sample size	Kaesang Pangarep	Mangkunegara X	Teguh Prakosa	Sekar Tandjung	Lead	Error margin
Jejaring Analiytics, Research and Communication Consulting	27 June - 2 July 2024	500	23.4%	31.8%	27.0%	4.1%	4.8%	2.83%

== Results ==
Candidate	Running mate	Party	Votes	%
Respati Ardi	Astrid Widayani	Gerindra Party	185,970	60.49
Teguh Prakosa	Bambang Nugroho	Indonesian Democratic Party of Struggle	121,471	39.51
Total			307,441	100.00
Valid votes			307,441	93.99
Invalid/blank votes			19,671	6.01
Total votes			327,112	100.00
Registered voters/turnout			442,975	73.84
Source: KPU
