= Teguh Prakosa =

19th Surakarta Mayor

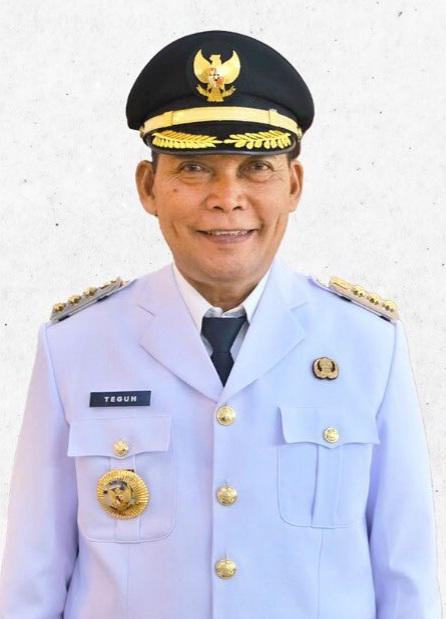
- Official Portrait, 2024

19th Mayor of Surakarta
- In office 19 July 2024 – 20 February 2025
- Preceded by: Gibran Rakabuming Raka
- Succeeded by: Respati Ardi

5th Vice Mayor of Surakarta
- In office 26 February 2021 – 19 July 2024
- Mayor: Gibran Rakabuming Raka
- Preceded by: Achmad Purnomo
- Succeeded by: Astrid Widayani

Member of Surakarta DPRD
- In office 14 August 2009 – 21 October 2020
- Succeeded by: Ety Isworo

Personal details
- Born: 10 November 1958 (age 68) Surakarta, Central Java, Indonesia
- Party: PDI-P

Teguh Prakosa (born 10 November 1958) is an Indonesian politician of the Indonesian Democratic Party of Struggle who served as the mayor of Surakarta, Central Java between July 2024 and February 2025, replacing Gibran Rakabuming Raka who was elected Vice President of Indonesia. He was previously the vice mayor of Gibran between 2021 and 2024, and had been elected three terms to Surakarta's city council.

== Early life ==
Teguh Prakosa was born on 10 November 1958 in Surakarta, Central Java. He completed his basic education there, graduating from State High School No. 4 Surakarta, before enrolling at the Sebelas Maret University to study sports science.

== Career ==
After receiving his degree, Prakosa began to work as a physical ed teacher at Bhineka Karya School in Surakarta, starting in 1986. He would remain in this job until 2009.

His participation in politics began when he joined the Indonesian Democratic Party of Struggle (PDI-P), starting from the party's branch in Pasar Kliwon district of Surakarta. In 2005, he became the party's vice-treasurer at the city level. His first candidacy was when he ran as a member of the Surakarta's Regional House of Representatives (DPRD) in the 2009 legislative election and won a seat. He was reelected for a second term in the 2014 election, and was appointed speaker of the DPRD. He was reelected for a third term in the 2019 election, after winning 6,830 votes.

In the 2020 Surakarta mayoral election, Prakosa ran as the running mate of Gibran Rakabuming Raka, with the pair winning 225,326 votes (86.1%). In order to do so, Prakosa had resigned from his seat in the legislature, effective on 21 October 2020. Gibran and Prakosa were sworn in as mayor and vice mayor on 26 February 2021.

Prakosa became mayor following the resignation of Gibran, who had been elected Vice President of Indonesia in the 2024 Indonesian general election, on 19 July 2024. His term expired on 20 February 2025, after he lost his 2024 election bid to Respati Ardi.

== Family ==
Prakosa married Serlly Yusnita, 26 years his junior, on 29 November 2015.
