= Forum Purnawirawan Declaration =

Political petition in Indonesia

Forum Purnawirawan Prajurit TNI 2025 refers to the political movement initiated by a coalition of retired Indonesian National Armed Forces (TNI) officers in April 2025. The forum issued an eight-point declaration calling for various political reforms, most notably urging the People's Consultative Assembly (MPR) to consider the removal of Vice President Gibran Rakabuming Raka. The movement criticized the constitutional amendment that enabled Gibran's candidacy in the 2024 presidential election, arguing it violated legal and ethical standards. Signed by 330 members of retired generals, admirals, and air marshals, including prominent figures such as former Vice President Try Sutrisno and General Fachrul Razi, the declaration became a focal point of political debate in Indonesia's early post-election period. While the forum expressed support for President Prabowo Subianto's administration, it sought to influence government policies and maintain adherence to what it viewed as constitutional principles.

== Background ==
Incumbent Indonesian Vice President, Gibran Rakabuming Raka

Gibran Rakabuming Raka, the eldest son of former President Joko Widodo (Jokowi), rose to national office following Indonesia's 2024 presidential election. Under Indonesia's Election Law, the minimum age requirement for presidential and vice-presidential candidates was originally set at 40 years (Article 169(q)). However, in October 2023, the Constitutional Court issued a controversial ruling amending the provision to allow individuals under 40 to run if they had experience as regional elected officials. This decision was widely perceived as paving the way for the 36-year-old Gibran's candidacy, sparking debates over judicial neutrality and accusations of nepotism. Despite public criticism, Gibran was selected as the vice-presidential running mate of Prabowo Subianto, a former general. The pair won the election held on February 14, 2024, a victory that was later certified by the General Election Commission (KPU) and upheld by the Constitutional Court in the face of post-election legal challenges. Gibran was officially inaugurated as Vice President of Indonesia in October 2024, alongside President Prabowo Subianto. His rise to the vice presidency—marking the first time a sitting president's child attained such high office—prompted widespread public scrutiny, raising concerns about constitutional legitimacy and the growing entrenchment of political dynasties. These developments also contributed to rising opposition from a faction of retired military officers in the months following the election.

== Petitioners ==
Main five petitioners of the Forum Purnawirawan Declaration

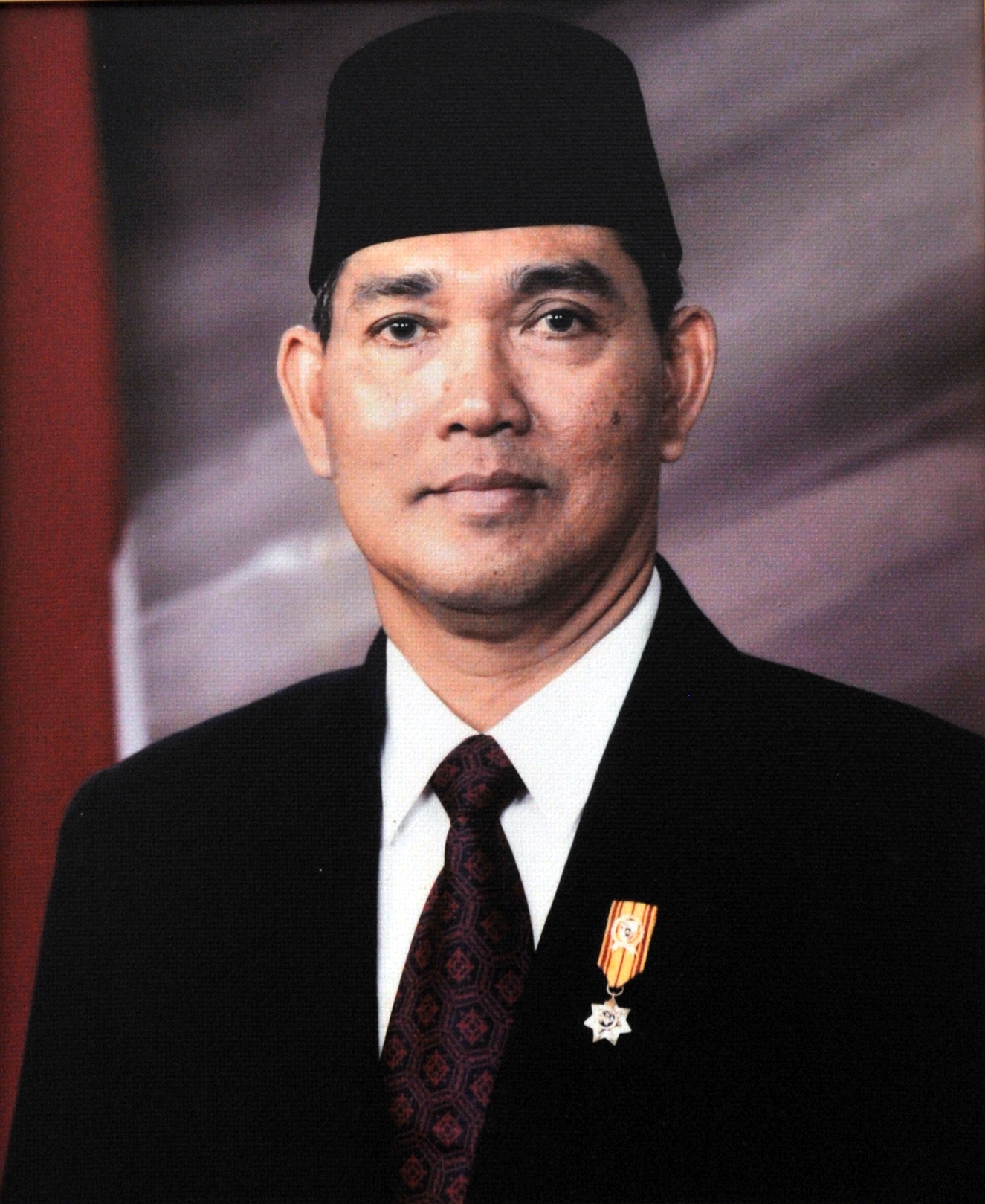
Former Vice President of Indonesia (1993–1998), Try Sutrisno (died March 2026)

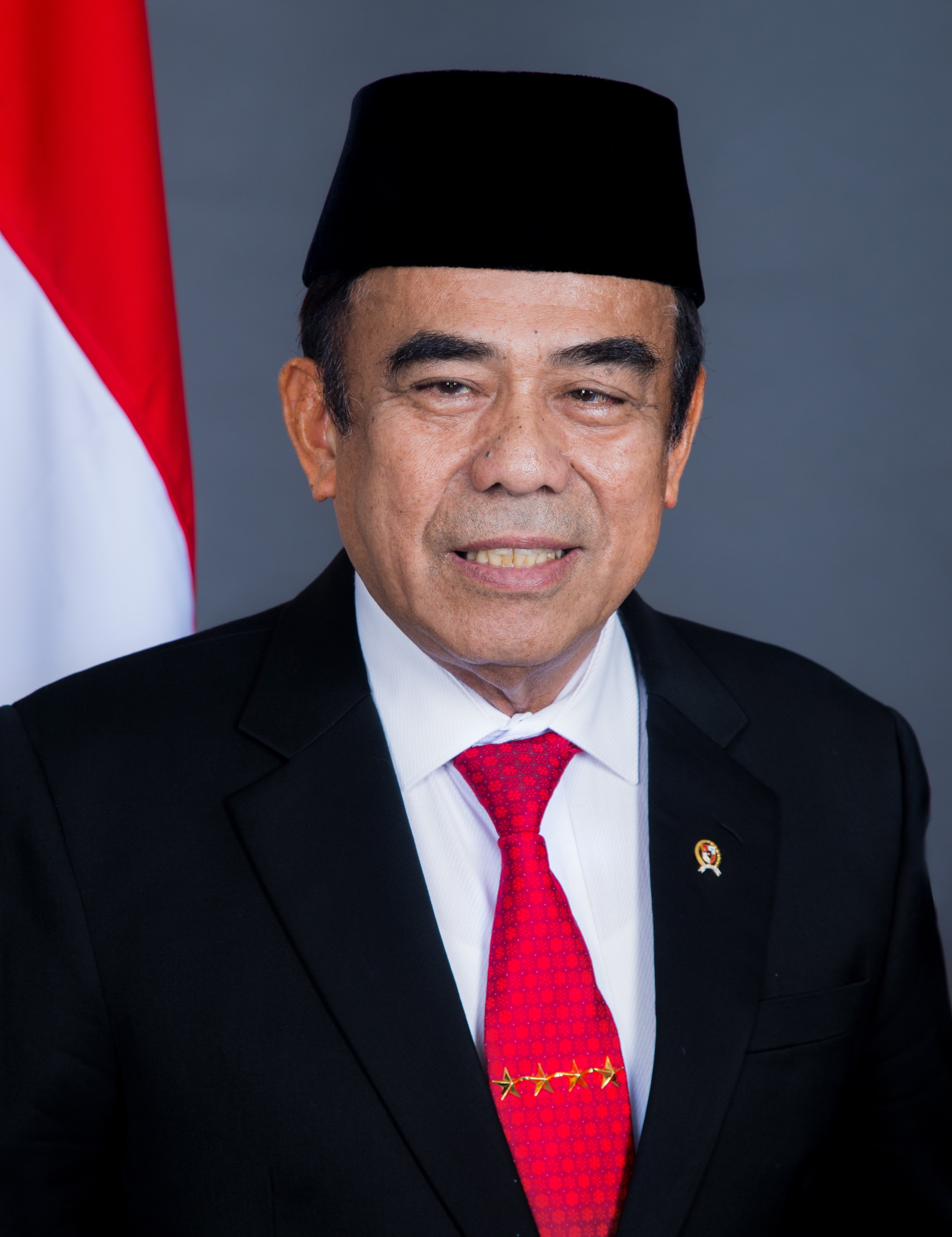
Former Vice Commander of the TNI (1999–2000), Fachrul Razi

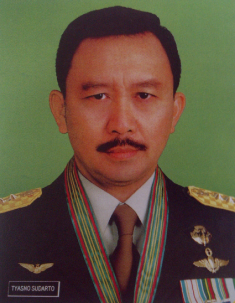
Former Army Chief of Staff (KSAD), (1999–2000), Tyasno Sudarto

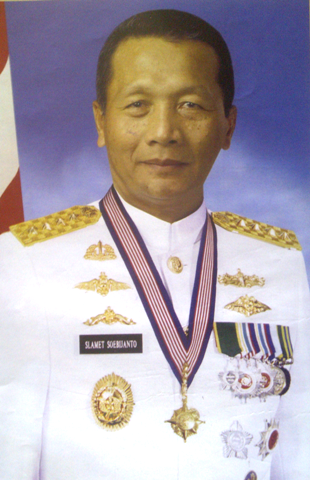
Former Navy Chief of Staff (KSAL), (2005–2007), Slamet Soebijanto

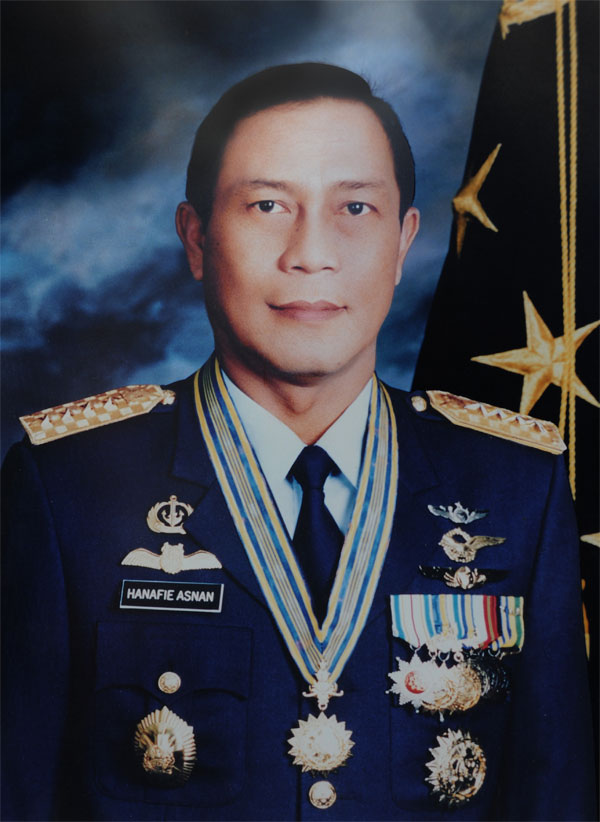
Former Air Force Chief of Staff (KSAU), (1998–2002), Hanafie Asnan

Following the inauguration of the new government, a coalition of retired Indonesian National Armed Forces (TNI) personnel organized to express their discontent. Known as the Forum Purnawirawan Prajurit TNI (Forum of Retired TNI Soldiers), the group convened a meeting on April 17, 2025, in Kelapa Gading, Jakarta. During silaturahmi (gathering), they issued a formal Pernyataan Sikap (statement of stance) articulating their concerns and demands. The statement of position was first broadcast on constitutional expert Refly Harun's podcast on YouTube on April 17, 2025. The document called for the removal of Vice President Gibran Rakabuming Raka from office and outlined a broader political reform agenda. It was signed by hundreds of former military officers and members of the TNI apparatus, including 103 retired generals, 73 retired admirals, 65 retired air marshals, and 91 retired colonels. Among the notable signatories were retired Army General Fachrul Razi (former TNI Vice Commander and Minister), retired General Tyasno Sudarto (Army Chief of Staff, 1999–2000), as well as former service chiefs Admiral Slamet Soebijanto (Navy) and Air Chief Marshal Hanafie Asnan (Air Force). Former Vice President Try Sutrisno, himself a retired TNI general who served from 1993 to 1998, also endorsed the statement, lending significant political weight to the forum's initiative.

The Forum Purnawirawan Prajurit TNI addressed its declaration to the People's Consultative Assembly (MPR), effectively petitioning the MPR to initiate proceedings to replace Gibran Rakabuming Raka as Vice President. Copies of the forum's eight-point statement quickly circulated across media outlets and online platforms, confirming its authenticity. In framing their demands, the retired officers emphasized their initiative as an effort to “save the nation,” prominently displaying the slogan: "We, the Forum of Retired TNI Soldiers, support President Prabowo Subianto in saving NKRI (the Unitary State of Indonesia)." The forum thereby affirmed loyalty to President Prabowo while opposing what they viewed as problematic remnants of the previous administration—most notably, the elevation of President Joko Widodo's son to the vice-presidency. This petition held a tug-of-war within the post-election ruling coalition, pitting Prabowo's military-aligned supporters against Jokowi's political camp.

=== Goals and Demands of the Purnawirawan Forum ===
In their April 17 declaration, the Forum Purnawirawan Prajurit TNI outlined eight principal demands addressing what they viewed as urgent political and governance challenges. Under the statement, the forum held broader ambitions, extending beyond the immediate issue of the vice presidency. The eight points are;

1. Return to the original 1945 Constitution as the foundation for Political Law and Government Procedures.
2. Support the Work Program of the Red and White Cabinet known as Asta Cita, except for the continuation of the development of the new capital city (IKN).
3. Halt the National Strategic Projects (PSN) PIK 2, PSN Rempang, and similar cases due to the significant harm and oppression of communities, as well as the environmental damage caused.
4. Stop the entry of Chinese foreign workers into the territory of the Republic of Indonesia and repatriate Chinese workers back to their country of origin.
5. The government must regulate mining operations that do not comply with regulations and with Article 33 Paragraphs 2 and 3 of the 1945 Constitution.
6. Conduct a reshuffle of ministers who are strongly suspected of committing corruption and take firm action against officials and state apparatuses who remain loyal or tied to the interests of former 7th President of Indonesia, Joko Widodo.
7. Return the Indonesian National Police (Polri) to its original function of maintaining public security and order (Kamtibmas) under the Ministry of Home Affairs.
8. Propose the replacement of the Vice President to the People's Consultative Assembly (MPR) on the grounds that the Constitutional Court's decision regarding Article 169 Letter Q of the Election Law violated Constitutional Court procedures and the Law on Judicial Power.

The forum repeatedly sent further copies of the petition, which sent in 19 August, followed by one more in 27 August. This time, the copies were also sent to the 6th Vice President of the Republic of Indonesia, Try Sutrisno; the 10th and 12th Vice Presidents of the Republic of Indonesia, Jusuf Kalla; the 11th Vice President of the Republic of Indonesia, Budiono; and the 13th Vice President of the Republic of Indonesia, K.H. Ma'ruf Amin. Copies were also sent to the Chief Justice of the Constitutional Court, the Commander of the Indonesian National Armed Forces (TNI), the Chiefs of Staff of the Army, Navy, and Air Force, the Chairman of the Indonesian Veterans Legion (LVRI), the Chairman of the 1945 National Daily Council, the Chairman of the Indonesian National Armed Forces (PEPABRI), the Chairman of the PPAD, PPAL, and PPAU, the Chairmen of Political Parties, the Chairmen of Community Organizations, and the Chairmen of Religious Organizations.

== Reaction ==
=== Prabowo ===
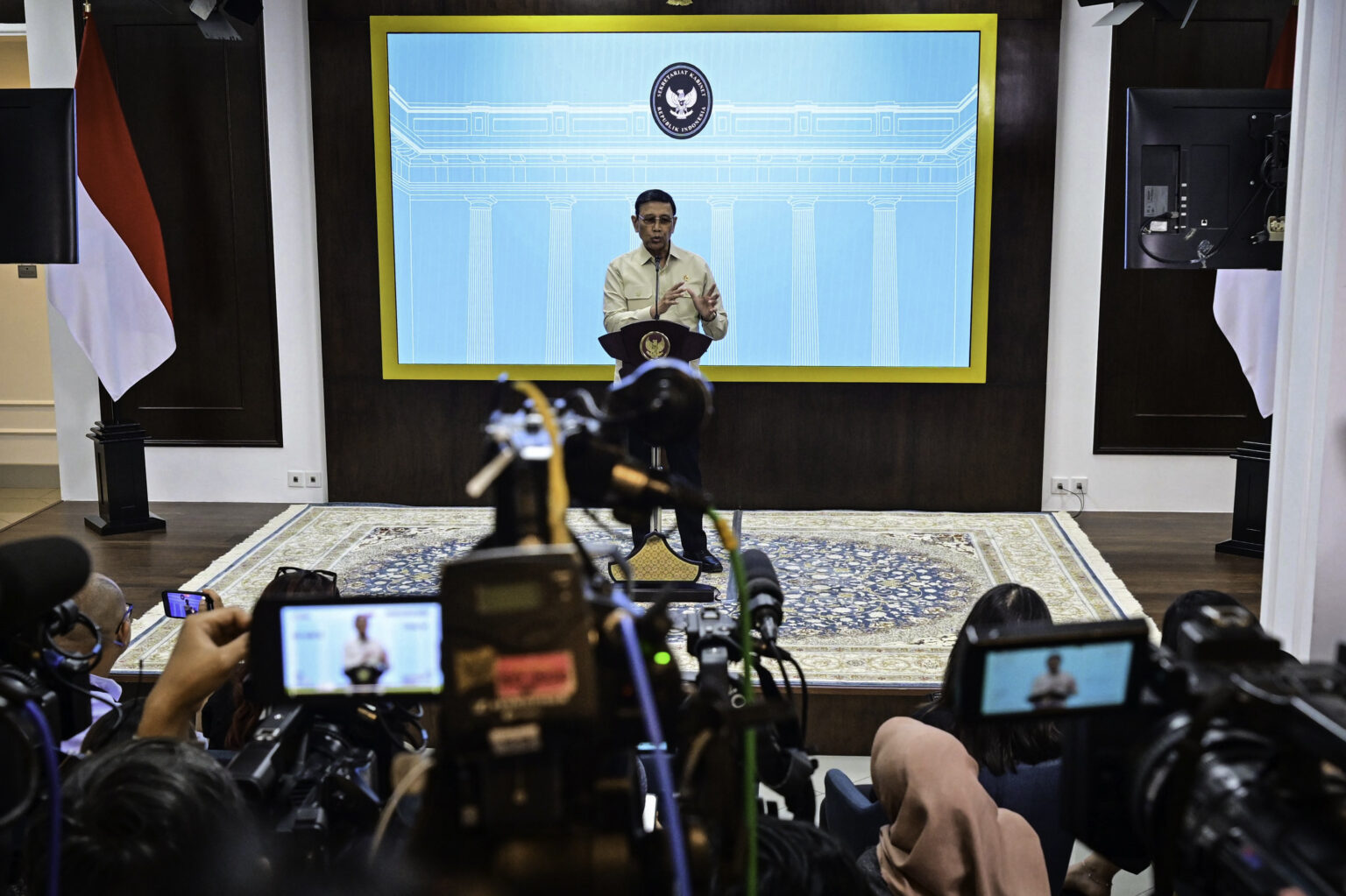
Special Advisor to the President for Political and Security Affairs, Wiranto delivers a press statement after meeting President Prabowo at the Presidential Palace, 24 April 2025.

President Prabowo Subianto's official response to the Forum Purnawirawan Prajurit TNI's demands has been characterized by measured respect combined with adherence to constitutional boundaries. Following the forum's public statement, Prabowo assigned Wiranto—a retired TNI general and his Special Advisor on Political and Security Affairs—to address the matter. In a press conference on April 24, Wiranto conveyed that President Prabowo “appreciates and respects” the aspirations of the retired officers, emphasizing that differing views are a natural feature of democracy. However, he underlines that the President must operate within the confines of the law and cannot act impulsively on demands that fall outside his constitutional authority. Wiranto specifically noted that certain proposals—implicitly referencing the removal of the Vice President—are “not the president's domain” and thus beyond Prabowo's unilateral powers. He affirmed that Prabowo would carefully study all eight points raised by the forum but would also seek advice from multiple other sources before considering any action. Furthermore, Prabowo, through Wiranto, urged the public to avoid overreacting or engaging in polemics over the issue, warning against “unnecessary commotion that could disturb our unity.” This response reflects a deliberate attempt to contain the controversy and maintain political stability amidst Jokowi loyalists and pro-Prabowo elements.

=== Government ===
“Don’t let our country be divided by foreign powers.”

— Luhut Binsar Pandjaitan, on Gibran's Impeachment petition, Tuesday, May 6, 2025.

Luhut Binsar Pandjaitan, as chairman of the National Economic Council and minister in Prabowo's cabinet, responded firmly to the proposal to impeach Gibran Rakabuming Raka from the TNI Retirees Forum. He called the call the petition as 'kampungan' (uneducated or uncouth) an uncouth commotion’ and emphasised that this could divide the unity of the nation with the manipulation of outside interests. Luhut also stressed the importance of upholding the constitution, going as far as stating that anyone unwilling to comply should consider leaving Indonesia. Furthermore, Luhut viewed this turmoil as an unproductive distraction amid greater global challenges and called on all elements of the nation to focus on supporting the stability of the Prabowo–Gibran administration.

==== MPR/DPR members ====
Ahmad Muzani, Speaker of the People's Consultative Assembly (MPR) and a senior figure within President Prabowo Subianto's Gerindra Party, responded to the Forum Purnawirawan's demands by reaffirming the legitimacy of the 2024 election outcome. Muzani emphasized that the Indonesian electorate had voted for the Prabowo-Gibran ticket, the ticket had been officially declared the winner, and even post-election challenges brought before the Constitutional Court had upheld the results. Speaking on 25 April 2025, Muzani reminded the public that the MPR's role was to inaugurate the elected president and vice president, which it had duly done, thereby affirming Gibran Rakabuming Raka's lawful position as Vice President. Muzani explicitly stated, “Prabowo is the legitimate President, and Gibran is the legitimate Vice President,” and emphasized that this outcome should be respected. When asked by reporters whether the replacement of a vice president was even conceivable, Muzani was non-committal but referred back to the electoral mandate. He acknowledged awareness of the retirees’ proposal but noted that no formal process within the MPR had been initiated regarding the matter. Muzani's remarks effectively signaled a lack of legislative momentum behind the forum's proposal, emphasizing continuity and respect for the electoral process.

United Development Party (PPP), a member of Prabowo's governing coalition, through politician Muhammad Romahurmuziy (Rommy), reacted by saying energy would be better spent addressing national economic issues than entertaining a proposal to remove Gibran. PPP suggested the focus should be on governing and solving problems, subtly indicating that the retirees’ idea is a distraction. This reflects a pragmatic view from a coalition partner that rocking the boat over Gibran is unnecessary and unhelpful.

Deddy Yevri Sitorus, a member of the House of Representatives (DPR) Commission II and a senior figure within the Indonesian Democratic Party of Struggle (PDI-P), publicly commented on the proposal. He described the suggestion as "a good idea," implying that such discourse could encourage the government and the Vice President to work more effectively for the people. However, Deddy clarified that he was not explicitly endorsing or rejecting the proposal, emphasizing that it is within the public's right to express opinions and suggestions.

=== Other ===
AM Hendropriyono, the former State Intelligence Agency (BIN) chief and a retired Lt. General known to be close to Jokowi, gave a nuanced take. Speaking on April 26, Hendropriyono defended the right of the retired generals to speak their mind as part of democratic freedom. However, he also implied that it is up to the broader public to judge whether the proposal is valid or not. Crucially, Hendropriyono expressed confidence that the retirees’ voice remains within the bounds of Pancasila ideology and that they likely had serious considerations before making the statement.

== See also ==
- Supersemar
