= Oetomo Ramelan =

Javanese mayor (1919–1967)

Raden Oetomo Ramelan
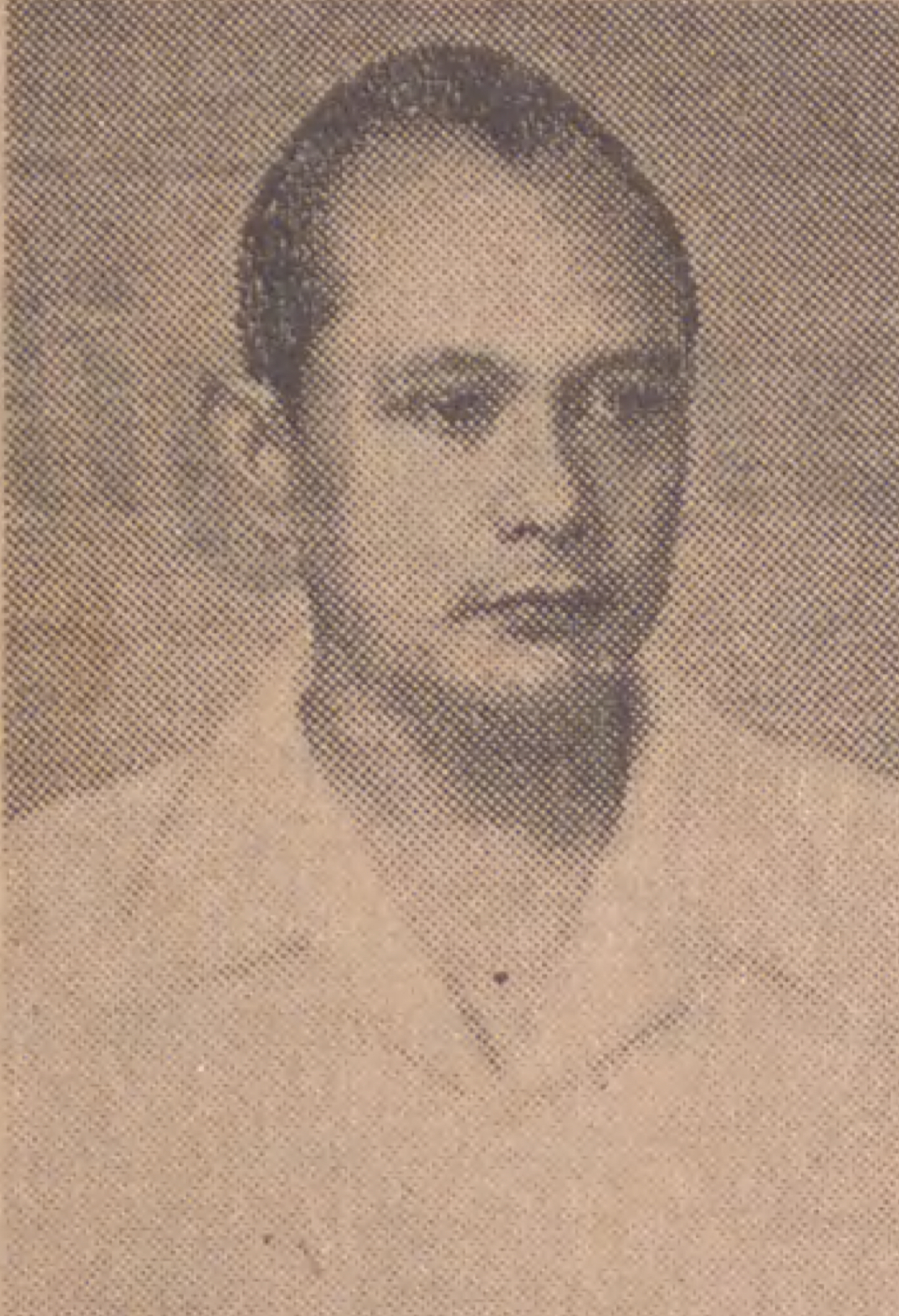

8th Mayor of Surakarta
- In office 17 February 1958 – 23 October 1965
- President: Sukarno
- Governor: Soekardji Mangoen Koesoemo; Hadisoebeno Sosrowerdojo; Mochtar
- Preceded by: Muhammad Saleh Werdisastro
- Succeeded by: Th. J. Soemantha

Member of Constitutional Assembly
- In office 9 November 1956 – 5 July 1959
- Constituency: Central Java

Personal details
- Born: 9 January 1919 Sragen, Dutch East Indies
- Died: c.1967 (aged 48) Indonesia
- Party: Communist Party of Indonesia
- Other political affiliations: Lembaga Kebudajaan Rakjat
- Education: Rechtshoogeschool te Batavia
- Profession: Politician, Artist

Raden Oetomo Ramelan (Republican Spelling: Utomo Ramelan, Javanese: ꦲ꦳ꦸꦠꦺꦴꦩꦺꦴꦬꦩꦼꦭꦤ꧀, translit. Hutomo Ramelan; 9 January 1919 – c.1967) was a former Mayor of Surakarta who served from 17 February 1958 to 23 October 1965. He was known as the only Mayor of Surakarta who came from the Indonesian Communist Party (PKI). Oetomo was sentenced to death by the Extraordinary Military Court (Mahmilub) on 22 June 1967, and shortly after that, he most likely faced execution.

== Early life ==
Oetomo was born in Sragen on 9 January 1919. His father, Raden Ramelan, was a district police chief (wedana polisi) in Surakarta. He was one of five siblings. One of his brothers, Mr. Oetojo Ramelan, was a former Indonesian Ambassador to Australia. His sister, Raden Roro Oetami, was the wife of Air Marshal Soerjadi Soerjadarma, the first Chief of Staff of the Indonesian Air Force (KSAU). His other two siblings were named Oetoro and Oetarjo.

Oetomo received his primary education at ELS in Surakarta. He then continued at MULO in the same city before finally enrolling in AMS Section A (Literature) in Yogyakarta in June 1939. He later took the entrance exam for the Rechtshogeschool te Batavia (RHS). Oetomo passed the RHS's first stage in September 1940 and the second stage in August 1941. After successfully passing both stages, he was admitted as a student at RHS and pursued his higher education there.

== Career ==
=== Japanese occupation era ===
In 1943, Oetomo worked as an employee at the Police Court (軽罪法院, keizaihōin, Kunrei-shiki: Keizai Hooin) in Jatinegara. The following year, he took the entrance exam for the Judicial Training School (司法監理養成所, shihōkanriyōseishō, Kunrei-shiki: sihookanri yooseizyo) located in Salemba (now the Postgraduate and Doctoral Campus of the Indonesian Defense University) and passed on 23 March 1944. In 1945, Oetomo became a prosecutor at the Surakarta District Court. He was also involved in the underground movement against the Japanese occupation.

=== Post-independence ===
In 1947, Oetomo became the personal secretary to the Military Governor of Surakarta at that time, Wikana. The following year, he became the editor-in-chief of the daily newspaper Ibu Kota. Additionally, he got involved in the conflict between the People's Democratic Front (FDR) and the central government by siding with the FDR. In 1950, Oetomo worked as a teacher at State Senior High School Surakarta (now State Senior High School 1 Surakarta) until 1957.

He then joined the Indonesian Communist Party (PKI) and became a candidate for the Constitutional Assembly in the 1955 general election from the Central Java electoral district. Oetomo was successfully elected as a member of the Constituent Assembly and served from 9 November 1956 until its dissolution on 5 July 1959. He also served on the Surakarta City Council, representing the PKI. Apart from becoming teacher and politician, Oetomo was also an active painter in the Surakarta branch of Lekra (Lembaga Kebudayaan Rakyat).

=== Mayor of Surakarta ===
In the 1957 local legislative elections, the Indonesian Communist Party (PKI) won 17 out of 30 seats in the Surakarta City Council. As a result, the PKI nominated Oetomo as mayor to replace Muhammad Saleh Werdisastro, a sympathizer of Muhammadiyah. He was successfully elected during the City Council session held on 23 January 1958. During his leadership, the PKI's influence grew significantly in both the rural areas and neighborhoods within and around Surakarta. In 1959, Lekra decided to hold its first national congress from 24 to 31 January in Surakarta. One of the main factors for choosing Surakarta as the congress venue was the PKI's dominance in the city, both in the executive branch and the parliament.

However, neither the party nor Oetomo himself ever implemented radical actions or policies. The party was more focused on social initiatives, such as improving road conditions, addressing the plight of the poor, and seeking support from civil servants. They never seized the assets of the wealthy. The batik merchants in Laweyan remained a respected force in the city. In fact, Oetomo himself stated that he had no objection if Indonesia accepted loans from the United States, as long as they were not accompanied by military aid.

In 1961, Oetomo established a red-light district for sex workers in Silir (now Mojo Sub-district). This area was created to ease government control over sex workers and to ensure that their rehabilitation process could be properly managed. They were provided with penicillin injections, craft and etiquette courses and were required to save money in a bank. Additionally, in 1962, Oetomo received an award for successfully eradicating illiteracy in Solo.

In 1963, he initiated the establishment of a private education institution, Surakarta Municipal University (UKPS/ Universitas Kotapradja Surakarta). (Note: UKPS was a private institution because, during Oetomo Ramelan's time, UNS (Universitas Sebelas Maret) was still in preparation.) This university was heavily influenced by the Indonesian Communist Party (PKI), with half of the members of the student organizations being dominated by cadres of the Consentrasi Gerakan Mahasiswa Indonesia (CGMI). Additionally, UKPS became a center for socialist studies in the city, and as a result, it was dissolved during the New Order era. On 20 February 1964, five music organizations took the initiative to form the Association of Indonesian Music Organizations (HOMI/Himpunan Organisasi Musik Indonesia) with the aim of improving the quality of music and ensuring that music in Indonesia aligned with the state's direction at the time. Oetomo, as both the mayor and an artist, acted as its patron.

== Post-30 September Movement ==
During the 30 September Movement, the Indonesian Communist Party (PKI) as a party did not mobilize the people of Surakarta to demonstrate in the streets in support of the movement. The only action taken by the party was to issue a statement of support through a radio broadcast made by Oetomo at 6 PM. Not much happened in Surakarta afterward, as the Revolutionary Council led by Major Iskandar decided to disband and release the officers who had been held hostage on 3 October after realizing that the movement in Jakarta had failed and they were no longer receiving orders from the Special Bureau.

The situation only changed drastically on October 22 when RPKAD (Army Para-Commando Regiment) troops arrived in Surakarta. The military took over the government, and the next day, Oetomo was arrested by the army. He was temporarily replaced by Lieutenant Colonel Th. J. Soemantha. Oetomo was then detained at the RPKAD barracks in Kandang Menjangan in Sukoharjo Regency, before being transferred to the Surakarta prison. Oetomo's trial began on 5 June 1967, and on 22 June 1967, he was found guilty by the Extraordinary Military Tribunal (Mahmilub). The tribunal sentenced him to death.

== Personal life ==
Oetomo had a wife who participated in the opening ceremony of the Cultural Week on 23 January 1959, a day before the First National Congress of Lekra was held. He was a Muslim.

== See also ==
- List of people who disappeared mysteriously: 1910–1990

== Bibliographies ==
- Crouch, Harold A. (2007). The Army and Politics in Indonesia. Singapore: Equinox Publishing. ISBN 978-979-3780-50-4.
- Fic, Victor M. (2005). Kudeta 1 Oktober 1965: Sebuah Studi Tentang Konspirasi. Jakarta: Yayasan Pustaka Obor Indonesia. ISBN 979-3780-50-9.
- Kementerian Penerangan (1956). Kumpulan Peraturan-Peraturan untuk Pemilihan Konstituante. Kementerian Penerangan.
- Poeze, Harry A. (2011). Madiun 1948: PKI Bergerak. Jakarta: Yayasan Pustaka Obor Indonesia. ISBN 978-979-461-780-9.
- Roosa, John (2020). Buried Histories: The Anticommunist Massacres of 1965–1966 in Indonesia. Madison: University of Wisconsin Press. ISBN 9780299327309.
- Yuliantri, Rhoma Dwi Aria; Dahlan, Muhidin M. (2008). Lekra Tak Membakar Buku: Suara Senyap Lembar Kebudayaan Harian Rakjat 1950-1965. Yogyakarta: Merakesumba. ISBN 978-979-184-750-6.
