= Surakarta City Regional House of Representatives =

Surakarta City Regional House of Representatives Dewan Perwakilan Rakyat Daerah Kota Surakarta
- 2024–2029 period

Type
- Type: Unicameral
- Term limits: 5 years

History
- New session started: 14 August 2024

Leadership
- Speaker: Budi Prasetyo, S.Sos., M.A.P., PDI-P since 16 October 2024
- 1st Vice Speaker: Daryono, S.T., PKS since 16 October 2024
- 2nd Vice Speaker: Muhammad Bilal, PSI since 16 October 2024
- 3rd Vice Speaker: Ardianto Kuswinarno, S.H., Gerindra since 16 October 2024

Structure
- Seats: 45
- Political groups: PKB (2) Gerindra (5) PDI-P (20) Golkar (3) PKS (7) PAN (3) PSI (5)

Elections
- Voting system: Open list
- Last election: 14 February 2024

Meeting place
- Surakarta City Regional House of Representatives Building; Adi Sucipto Street Number 143; Karangasem, Laweyan, Surakarta; Central Java, Indonesia

Website
- dprd.surakarta.go.id

The Surakarta City Regional House of Representatives (Indonesian: Dewan Perwakilan Rakyat Daerah Kota Surakarta, DPRD Kota Surakarta) is the unicameral municipal legislature of Surakarta, Central Java, Indonesia. It has 45 members, who are elected every five years, simultaneously with the national legislative election.

== Legal basis ==
The legislature for Surakarta was formed along with those of other cities in Central Java under Law Number 16 of 1950, which organized city governments within the province.

== General election results ==
=== 2024 Indonesian legislative election ===
The official valid votes received by political parties contesting the 2024 Indonesian legislative election in each electoral district (constituency) for members of the Surakarta City Regional House of Representatives are as follows.

2024 Indonesian legislative election results

Electoral district	PKB	Gerindra	PDI-P	Golkar	NasDem	Labour	Gelora	PKS	PKN	Hanura	Garuda	PAN	PBB	Democratic	PSI	Perindo	PPP	Ummat	Valid votes
Surakarta City 1	6,063	8,676	33,949	4,345	2,843	388	196	11,321	36	125	243	4,930	62	1,360	8,556	569	500	1,176	85,338
Surakarta City 2	2,401	4,884	23,069	6,491	1,248	341	198	9,778	21	74	82	2,937	259	619	9,343	423	529	357	63,054
Surakarta City 3	872	4,950	23,829	3,583	1,465	333	103	10,230	37	65	83	1,159	42	2,531	7,384	834	202	262	57,964
Surakarta City 4	668	6,568	18,750	3,620	306	369	160	8,983	2,304	48	81	4,319	34	742	4,229	378	2,589	115	54,263
Surakarta City 5	3,552	9,654	43,836	3,296	1,370	543	354	10,927	105	164	289	3,828	54	1,414	10,070	890	1,420	395	92,161
Total	13,556	34,732	143,433	21,335	7,232	1,974	1,011	51,239	2,503	476	778	17,173	451	6,666	39,582	3,094	5,240	2,305	352,780
Source: General Elections Commission of Indonesia

== Composition ==
The following is the composition of members of the Surakarta City Regional House of Representatives in the last four periods.

Party	Total seats			
Party	2009–2014	2014–2019	2019–2024	2024–2029
PKB seats	0	0	0	▲2
Gerindra seats	2	▲3	3	▲5
PDI-P seats	15	▲24	▲30	▼20
Golkar seats	4	4	▼3	3
PKS seats	4	▲5	5	▲7
Hanura seats	2	▼1	▼0	0
PAN seats	4	4	▼3	3
Demokrat seats	7	▼3	▼0	0
PSI seats			1	▲5
PPP seats	0	▲1	▼0	0
PDS seats	2			
Total Seats	40	▲45	45	45
Total Party	8	8	▼6	▲7

== Electoral District ==
In the 2019 Legislative Election, the Surakarta City Regional House of Representatives election was divided into 5 electoral districts as follows:

Electoral District Name	Electoral District Area	Number of Seats
SURAKARTA CITY 1	Pasar Kliwon, Serengan	11
SURAKARTA CITY 2	Laweyan	8
SURAKARTA CITY 3	Banjarsari A (Banyuanyar, Gilingan, Keprabon, Kestalan, Ketelan, Manahan, Mangkubumen, Punggawan, Setabelan, Sumber, Timuran)	7
SURAKARTA CITY 4	Banjarsari B (Kadipiro, Nusukan)	7
SURAKARTA CITY 5	Jebres	12
TOTAL		45

In the 2024 Legislative Election, the Surakarta City Regional House of Representatives election was divided into 5 electoral districts as follows:

Electoral District Name	Electoral District Area	Number of Seats
SURAKARTA CITY 1	Pasar Kliwon, Serengan	11
SURAKARTA CITY 2	Laweyan	8
SURAKARTA CITY 3	Banjarsari A (Gilingan, Setabelan, Kestalan, Keprabon, Timuran, Ketelan, Punggawan, Mangkubumen, Manahan, Sumber, Banyuanyar)	7
SURAKARTA CITY 4	Banjarsari B (Kadipiro, Nusukan, Banjarsari, Joglo)	7
SURAKARTA CITY 5	Jebres	12
TOTAL		45

== See also ==
- Surakarta
- Central Java
