= F. X. Hadi Rudyatmo =

Mayor of Surakarta from 2012 to 2021

Fransiskus Xaverius Hadi Rudyatmo
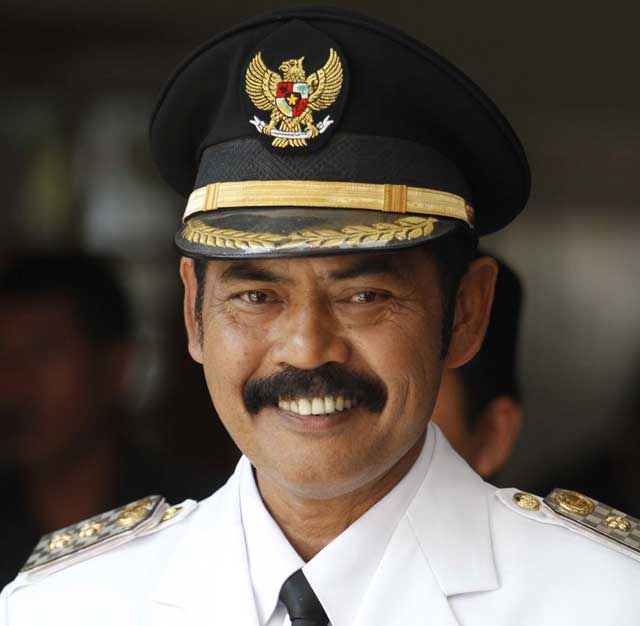

17th Mayor of Surakarta
- In office 19 October 2012 – 17 February 2021
- Vice Mayor: Achmad Purnomo
- Preceded by: Joko Widodo
- Succeeded by: Gibran Rakabuming Raka

3rd Vice Mayor of Surakarta
- In office 28 July 2005 – 4 October 2012
- Mayor: Joko Widodo
- Preceded by: J. Suprapto
- Succeeded by: Achmad Purnomo

Member of Surakarta City Council
- In office 2004–2005

Personal details
- Born: Fransiskus Xaverius Hadi Rudyatmo; 13 February 1960 (age 66) Surakarta, Central Java, Indonesia
- Party: PDI Perjuangan
- Spouse: Ny. Endang Prasetyaningsih Rudyatmo
- Children: 5

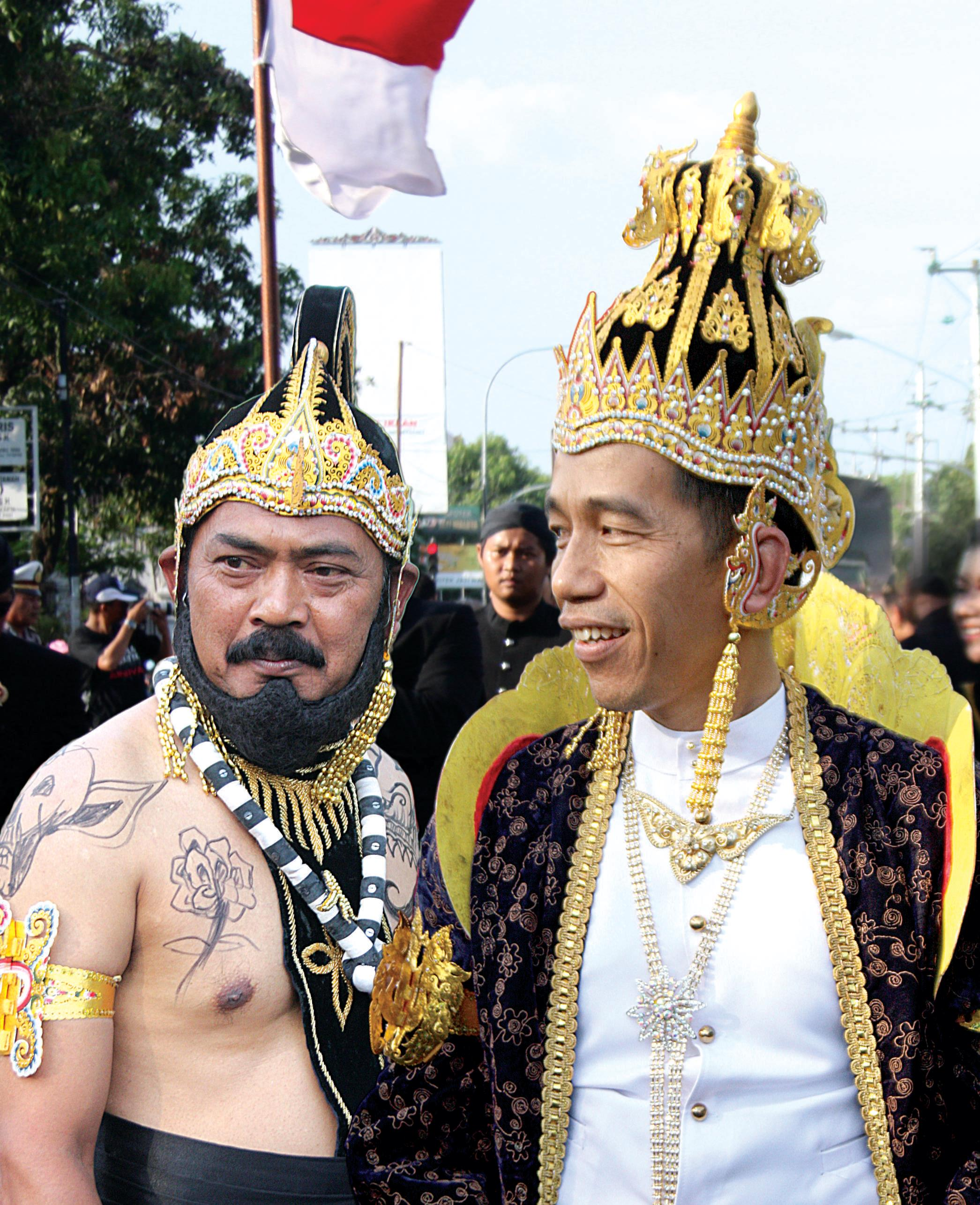
F. X. Hadi Rudyatmo and Jokowi as Surakarta's mayor in traditional Javanese wayang wong costume.

Fransiskus Xaverius Hadi Rudyatmo (born 13 February 1960) is an Indonesian politician and former Mayor of Surakarta. His party is the Indonesian Democratic Party – Struggle (PDI-P).

Before his role as mayor, he was elected to Surakarta's city council in 2004, and eventually became deputy mayor in 2005. After being reelected in 2010, he became the mayor when Joko Widodo became the Governor of Jakarta. He was then reelected in 2015. Prior to entering politics, he had worked as a welder and owned his own workshop.

After PDI-P and Jokowi's worsening ties in 2023, he became a prominent critic of Jokowi and his family.
