= 2029 Indonesian presidential election =

Presidential elections to be held in Indonesia before October 2029

- By 20 October 2029
Incumbent President
Prabowo Subianto
Gerindra

Presidential elections will be held in Indonesia no later than 20 October 2029. Incumbent president Prabowo Subianto is eligible to run again for a second term in office.

The presidential election will be held together with the legislative election for members of the House of Representatives (DPR) and the Regional Representative Council (DPD). After the Constitutional Court ruled in 2025 that national elections and local elections to be not simultaneous starting 2029, it is still unclear whether elections for provincial legislative councils (DPRD Provinsi) and municipal legislative councils (DPRD Kabupaten or DPRD Kota) will be held together too in 2029 or postponed to a later date.

The winner of the presidential election will be sworn in on 20 October 2029.

== Electoral system ==
The President of Indonesia is directly elected every five years. As stipulated in Article 7 of the Constitution, incumbent president Prabowo is eligible to run for a second and final term. The presidential election is required to be held before the expiration of his current term on 20 October 2029.

The general election period is regulated in Article 6A and Article 22E of the Constitution and by the Law on General Elections. The presidential and vice-presidential nominees are proposed by political parties or coalitions of parties, including those which are not sitting in the parliament. Unlike previous presidential elections, there will be no presidential threshold, thus every eligible political party may field a pair of candidates.

A runoff is held if no candidates obtains more than 50% of the votes with at least 20% of the votes in more than half of the provinces in Indonesia in the first round. As of the 2024 election, a runoff has only ever taken place in 2004.

== Candidates ==
=== Declared ===
==== Prabowo Subianto ====
Prabowo Subianto was nominated by the Gerindra Party as the 2029 presidential candidate on 14 February 2025. If re-elected, Prabowo will be 83 at the end of his second and final term.

Advanced Indonesia Coalition ticket
Prabowo Subianto	
for President	for Vice President
President of Indonesia (since 2024); Minister of Defense (2019–2024)	
Supporting parties: Golkar, National Awakening Party, National Mandate Party, Gema Bangsa Party, Indonesian People's Party

== Opinion polls ==
==== 2026 ====
Pollster	Fieldwork date	Sample size	Margin of error									Other candidates	Unsure	Lead
Pollster	Fieldwork date	Sample size	Margin of error	Prabowo Subianto Gerindra	Anies Baswedan Independent	Ganjar Pranowo PDI-P	Gibran Rakabuming Independent	Agus Yudhoyono Demokrat	Dedi Mulyadi Gerindra	Purbaya Yudhi Sadewa Independent	Sherly Tjoanda Independent	Other candidates	Unsure	Lead
Indonesia Political Opinion	12–20 October 2026	1,200	±2.9% pp	18.4	12.6	4.5	3.1	1.9	32.0	—N/a	1.0	6.4	20.1	Dedi +13.6
SMRC	1–10 October 2026	1,213	±2.9% pp	9.8	10.3	5.0	8.4	2.1	35.5	5.0	1.8	8.1 (Note: Mahfud MD (1.7) * Kaesang Pangarep (1.2) * Pramono Anung (1.0) * Erick Thohir (0.9) * Khofifah Indar Parawansa (0.8) * Andi Amran Sulaiman (0.5) * Susi Pudjiastuti (0.5) * Andika Perkasa (0.3) * Surya Paloh (0.3) * Muhaimin Iskandar (0.2) * Ahmad Luthfi (0.2) * Bahlil Lahadalia (0.2) * Others (0.3))	13.9	Dedi +25.2
Parameter Politik Indonesia	26 September–6 October 2026	1,200	±2.83% pp	31.6	10.1	4.4	6.9	2.3	11.4	0.8	1.1	5.9	25.5	Prabowo +20.2
Tempo Data Science	31 July–11 August 2026	1,260	±2.9% pp	15.0	10.0	4.0	6.0	3.0	42.0	—N/a	4.0	2.0 (Note: Mahfud MD (2.0))	14.0	Dedi +27.0
Median	21 July–2 August 2026	1,212	±2.76% pp	32.4	20.5	5.0	2.6	2.0	20.6	0.8	4.1	7.7 (Note: Mahfud MD (2.1) * Andika Perkasa (1.5) * Basuki Tjahaja Purnama (1.2) * Erick Thohir (1.0) * Sandiaga Uno (0.5) * Kaesang Pangarep (0.5) * Almuzzammil Yusuf (0.3) * Pramono Anung (0.2) * Bahlil Lahadalia (0.2) * Anis Matta (0.2))	4.5	Prabowo +11.8
Indonesia Political Opinion	27 July–3 August 2026	1,200	±2.9% pp	19.0	12.7	4.6	5.1	5.8	29.5	1.5	3.5	6.9	11.4	Dedi +10.5
SMRC	5–19 July 2026	749	±3.7% pp	14.5	8.2	4.2	7.7	4.9	35.0	1.1	1.2	10.3 (Note: Mahfud MD (4.0) * Puan Maharani (1.3) * Surya Paloh (1.0) * Other candidates, each <1% (4.0))	12.8	Dedi +20.5
SMRC	February–March 2026	—N/a	—N/a	33.3	10.8	—N/a	6.8	—N/a	23.3	—N/a	—N/a	18.9 (Note: Includes Ganjar Pranowo, Agus Harimurti Yudhoyono, Basuki Tjahaja Purnama, Purbaya Yudhi Sadewa, Puan Maharani, Sherly Tjoanda, and other candidates; individual figures for this wave were not broken out in SMRC's July 2026 trend chart.)	6.9	Prabowo +10.0
Poltracking	2–8 March 2026	1,220	±2.9% pp	32.9	9.2	2.6	4.2	1.9	13.5	0.8	—N/a	6.1 (Note: Basuki Tjahaja Purnama (0.5))	28.8	Prabowo +19.4
Indonesian Public Institute	30 January–5 February 2026	1,241	±2.78 pp	22.3	8.5	9.0	12.2	1.9	7.9	4.9	3.8	29.5 (Note: Pramono Anung (7.8) * Sjafrie Sjamsoeddin (7.5) * Puan Maharani (5.0) * Muzakir Manaf (3.1) * Sandiaga Uno (3.0) * Ridwan Kamil (1.6) * Other candidates (1.5))	—N/a	Prabowo +10.1
Indekstat	11–25 January 2026	1,200	±2.9 pp	48.9	10.1	3.4	3.7	0.9	16.9	4.4	—N/a	4.3 (Note: Basuki Tjahaja Purnama (2.3))	7.4	Prabowo +32.0

==== 2025 ====
Pollster	Fieldwork date	Sample size	Margin of error									Other candidates (Note: Included Muhaimin Iskandar and Mahfud MD in several polls, who were former running mates for the respective candidates Anies Baswedan and Ganjar Pranowo.)	Unsure	Lead
Pollster	Fieldwork date	Sample size	Margin of error	Prabowo Subianto Gerindra	Anies Baswedan Independent	Ganjar Pranowo PDI-P	Gibran Rakabuming Independent	Agus Yudhoyono Demokrat	Erick Thohir Independent	Dedi Mulyadi Gerindra	Purbaya Yudhi Sadewa Independent	Other candidates	Unsure	Lead
SMRC	November 2025 (Note: Conducted by telephone, unlike the mixed phone/face-to-face method used in the February–March 2026 and July 2026 polls.)	—N/a	—N/a	34.9	6.1	—N/a	5.1	—N/a	—N/a	19.7	—N/a	16.9 (Note: Includes Ganjar Pranowo, Agus Harimurti Yudhoyono, Basuki Tjahaja Purnama, Purbaya Yudhi Sadewa, Puan Maharani, Sherly Tjoanda, and other candidates; individual figures for this wave were not broken out in SMRC's July 2026 trend chart.)	17.3	Prabowo +15.2
Indikator	20–27 October 2025	1,220	±2.9 pp	46.7	9.0	3.7	4.8	3.9	0.4	18.4	1.5	4.0	7.6	Prabowo +28.3
Poltracking	3–10 October 2025	1,220	±2.9 pp	48.5	6.3	2.0	4.9	1.8	0.1	15.7	—N/a	3.0	17.7	Prabowo +32.8
Index Politica	1–10 October 2025	1,610	±1.6 pp	40.1	13.4	7.1	4.8	5.1	1.1	2.5	22.5	0.2	3.1	Prabowo +17.6
LSI	20–28 January 2025	1,220	±2.9 pp	69.4	8.2	2.2	6.4	3.1	0.5	1.0	—N/a	4.9	4.3	Prabowo +61.2
Indikator	16–21 January 2025	1,220	±2.9 pp	68.9	8.6	5.9	3.8	3.1	1.3	—N/a	—N/a	2.3	6.1	Prabowo +60.3
2024 election	14 February 2024	—N/a	—N/a	58.6	24.9	16.5	Running as Prabowo's running mate	Did not participate (Note: Except for Muhaimin Iskandar and Mahfud MD (who included in several polls) who were running mates for the respective candidates Anies Baswedan and Ganjar Pranowo.)					—N/a	Prabowo +33.7
