= KaburAjaDulu =

Indonesian protest induced Brain drain

#KaburAjaDulu (lit. 'Just escape first') is a viral hashtag that gained traction on Indonesian social media in February 2025, particularly on the platform X (formerly Twitter). The hashtag was widely used by Indonesian netizens to express a growing desire to seek better opportunities abroad, whether in the fields of employment, education, or overall quality of life. The trend has contributed to a wave of voluntary emigration and has been cited as a form of socially and politically driven brain drain. The phenomenon reflects public unease over domestic social and economic conditions, including the high cost of education, limited job opportunities, and low wages. Through #KaburAjaDulu, many users shared information on job openings, scholarships, and career opportunities abroad.

In addition, #KaburAjaDulu also became a platform for discussing social and economic pressures, including toxic work environments and unhealthy personal relationships. Some netizens viewed "escaping" as a solution to seek a better life, while others debated its implications for nationalism and loyalty to the country. Public figures such as Anies Baswedan argued that seeking opportunities abroad does not equate to a lack of nationalism, but rather can be a way to improve one's quality of life and contribute more meaningfully to the nation.

== Origins ==
The emergence of #KaburAjaDulu can be traced back to 2023, when technology enthusiasts began using the hashtag as a call to seek opportunities abroad. However, its popularity surged in February 2025, coinciding with growing public dissatisfaction over domestic conditions. The hashtag went viral as a form of criticism against various government policies perceived as harmful to the public, such as budget cuts to education and the rising number of layoffs.

One figure considered influential in promoting the idea of working abroad is Irwan Prasetiyo, a labor analyst who has long advocated for Indonesian youth to gain overseas work experience. Irwan frequently emphasizes that working abroad not only offers better salaries but also provides opportunities to acquire global skills that can be beneficial upon returning to Indonesia. In several interviews and seminars, he has criticized the government's inability to create quality jobs and encouraged young people not to hesitate in seeking opportunities overseas.

== Causes ==
Several key factors contributed to the emergence of the #KaburAjaDulu phenomenon:

- Many young Indonesians face significant challenges in obtaining decent jobs that align with their qualifications and expectations. High unemployment rates—particularly among recent graduates—along with wages that do not keep pace with the rising cost of living, are major factors driving dissatisfaction in the workforce.
- Government policies on budget efficiency, such as those outlined in Presidential Instruction No. 1 of 2025, have had a significant impact on various sectors, including education and public services. These budget cuts have led to a decline in the quality of services and opportunities, thereby fueling public disappointment.
- The gap between the rich and the poor is widening, making it increasingly difficult for many young people to improve their standard of living. Access to quality education and adequate healthcare remains limited for those from economically disadvantaged backgrounds.
- Corruption, injustice, and discrimination continue to be unresolved issues in Indonesia. Many young people have grown skeptical about the nation's future and have lost trust in the government and political parties.

== Impact ==
=== Economic impact ===
One of the main consequences of this phenomenon is the potential for a brain drain—the migration of skilled and educated workers abroad. The loss of young and productive talent can reduce national productivity and hinder innovation across various sectors. In addition, a decline in the number of high-quality workers within the country may slow economic growth and weaken Indonesia's competitiveness on the global stage.

=== Social impact ===
Socially, the #KaburAjaDulu phenomenon reflects the anxiety and disappointment of the younger generation regarding the domestic situation. Many young people feel they have little hope or a bright future in Indonesia, particularly due to difficulties in obtaining decent employment and the high level of social inequality. This can trigger feelings of frustration and alienation among youth, which in turn may reduce social cohesion and increase distrust toward government institutions.

=== Political ===
From a political perspective, the growing desire to leave Indonesia can be seen as a form of criticism toward government policies perceived as failing to meet the needs and aspirations of the younger generation. This phenomenon may affect political stability, especially if the government is unable to respond with effective policies to address the root causes behind the desire to migrate.

== Response ==
=== Government ===
The Minister of Manpower, Yassierli, acknowledged that the #KaburAjaDulu trend poses a challenge for the government. He emphasized the importance of the government addressing public aspirations by creating better employment opportunities within the country. Yassierli also encouraged the younger generation to remain optimistic and to contribute to national development. The Deputy Minister of Manpower, Afriansyah Noor, responded to the phenomenon by stating that the government supports Indonesian citizens who wish to work abroad. However, he also emphasized that the government continues to make efforts to create decent job opportunities within the country so that people do not feel compelled to seek opportunities overseas.

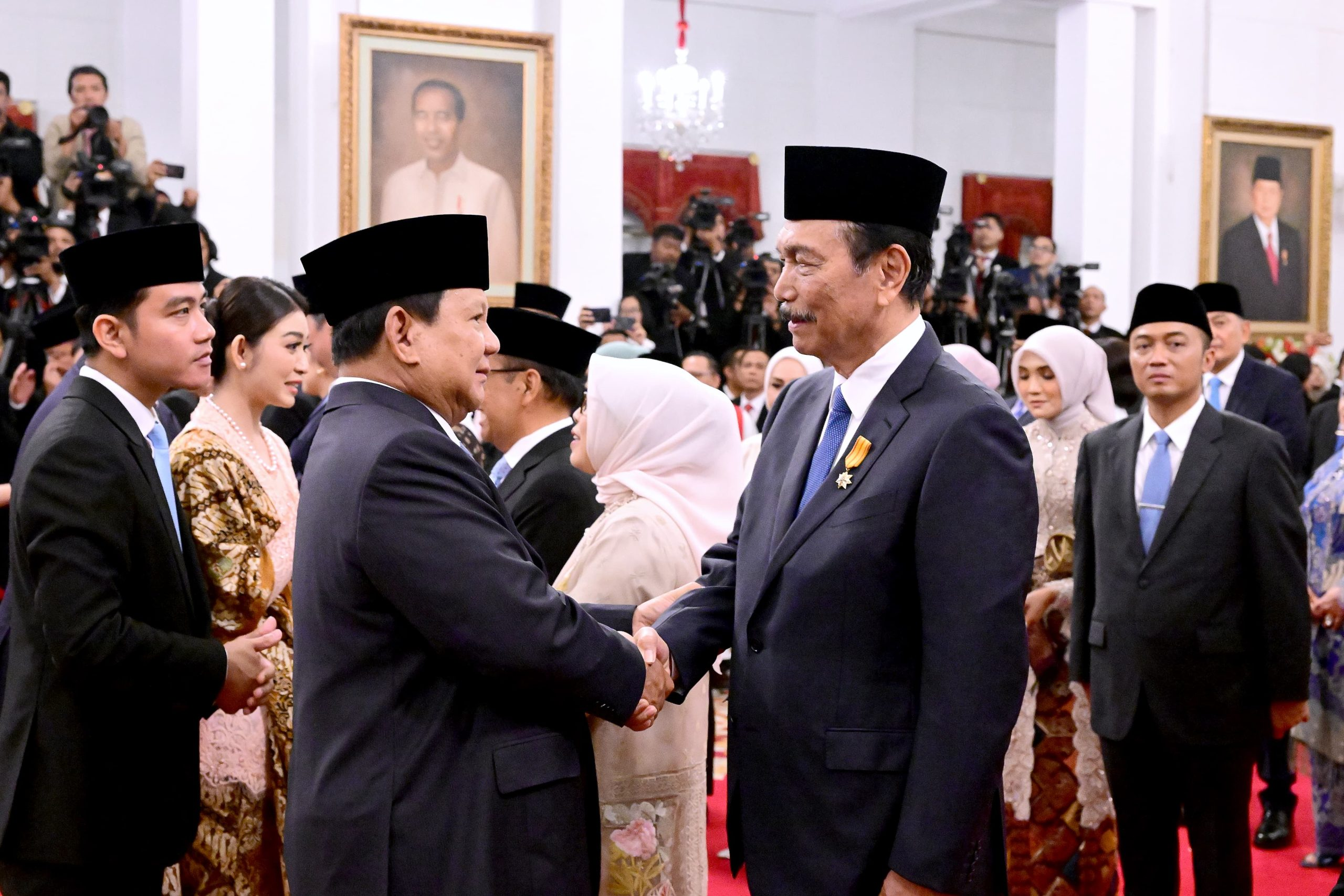
Luhut Binsar Pandjaitan after being inaugurated by President Prabowo Subianto

The Chairman of the National Economic Council and Special Presidential Advisor, Luhut Binsar Pandjaitan, urged the public not to rush in judging the performance of President Prabowo Subianto's administration, which had only been in office for about 100 days. He called on the public to give the government time to realize the programs that had been planned.

The Director for the Protection of Indonesian Citizens and Legal Entities Abroad at the Ministry of Foreign Affairs, Judha Nugraha, responded to the phenomenon by stressing the importance of proper procedures for Indonesians seeking to work or study abroad. Judha revealed that there were 67,000 cases involving the Indonesian diaspora, most of which were related to immigration violations. Therefore, he emphasized the need to comply with official procedures to avoid legal issues in the destination countries. Although there has been no official statement from the Minister of Education and Culture, several officials from the ministry have stated that they are reviewing the #KaburAjaDulu phenomenon as part of an evaluation to improve the quality of education and create a stronger link and match between the education system and industry. This initiative is expected to reduce the desire among the younger generation to seek opportunities abroad.

=== Legislators ===
Charles Honoris, Deputy Chair of Commission IX of the Indonesian House of Representatives (DPR RI), viewed the emergence of the #KaburAjaDulu hashtag as a signal of young people's dissatisfaction with working conditions in Indonesia. He urged the government not to respond to the phenomenon carelessly, such as by labeling citizens who wish to go abroad as lacking in nationalism. Instead, Charles suggested that the government use this moment for introspection and evaluation of existing policies. According to him, this is essential to ensure that the younger generation remains optimistic and believes they can build a future in Indonesia.

Okta Kumala Dewi, a member of Commission I of the DPR RI from the National Mandate Party (PAN), stated that the desire of young people to seek opportunities abroad is their right. She emphasized that every individual has the freedom to choose their own path in life, including pursuing work or education overseas. However, Okta also expressed hope that the government would create a more supportive environment at home, so that young people feel motivated to contribute to national development.

Willy Aditya, Chair of Commission XIII of the DPR RI, interpreted the #KaburAjaDulu movement as an emotional expression of the public in response to current conditions. He considered the expression a temporary form of escapism and stressed that such emotions are natural. Nevertheless, Willy reminded that the real challenge lies in how the government can create conditions that make young people feel at home and hopeful in their own country.

Rahayu Saraswati, Deputy Chair of the Gerindra Party, stated that studying or working abroad is normal and can provide individuals with valuable experiences. However, she expressed hope that those who go abroad will maintain the intention to return and contribute to the nation. According to her, the experience and knowledge gained overseas can become valuable assets for building a better Indonesia.

=== Academics ===
Tadjudin Nur Effendi, a labor analyst from Gadjah Mada University (UGM), linked the virality of the #KaburAjaDulu hashtag to uncertainty over socioeconomic conditions in Indonesia. He highlighted the government's budget cuts of Rp306.69 trillion in the 2025 state budget (APBN) as one of the factors triggering public anxiety. According to him, these cuts disrupted the job stability of civil servants and created uncertainty in the public sector.

Enda Nasution, coordinator of Bijak Bersosmed, noted that the #KaburAjaDulu hashtag had actually been used for several years, but went viral again in response to the current situation. He observed that social media played a major role in amplifying the phenomenon, allowing young people to express their disappointment with conditions in Indonesia and explore alternatives abroad.

Radius Setiyawan, a sociology expert from Muhammadiyah University of Surabaya, viewed the #KaburAjaDulu trend as an expression of frustration—particularly from Generation Z—toward controversial public policies. He emphasized that this phenomenon deserves serious government attention, especially as it emerged alongside reports of 80% approval for the administration's first 100 days. According to him, such expressions of disappointment reveal a gap between the government's perception and the reality felt by the public.

Suko Widodo, a political communication expert from Airlangga University, believed the #KaburAjaDulu phenomenon reflects the weakening of national spirit among youth due to socioeconomic uncertainty. He argued that the frustration was not only driven by economic hardship but also by dissatisfaction with government policies seen as neglectful of younger generations. Suko warned that if the issue is not addressed, Indonesia risks losing its brightest youth to overseas opportunities.

Tiara Puspita observed that the #KaburAjaDulu trend reveals young people's frustration with conditions that seem difficult to change. She explained that many feel powerless in the face of structural barriers, and prefer to seek certainty abroad rather than remain in domestic uncertainty.

=== Public response ===
The #KaburAjaDulu phenomenon has sparked diverse reactions among Indonesians, particularly on social media. The hashtag has become a platform for younger generations to express dissatisfaction with the situation in Indonesia. Many believe that job opportunities and quality of life abroad are more promising than at home. This is reflected in various social media posts sharing experiences of working or studying abroad, as well as encouraging others to follow suit. The phenomenon is seen as a form of criticism toward government policies perceived as neglecting youth. Although there is encouragement to seek opportunities abroad, some segments of society emphasize that this does not imply a lack of love for Indonesia. On the contrary, there is a view that by working or studying abroad and achieving success, young people can bring a positive image of Indonesia to the international stage. This concept is known as "cosmopolitan nationalism", where individuals maintain their love for the homeland while contributing globally.

The rise of the #KaburAjaDulu hashtag is also seen as a form of digital criticism of government policies perceived as not pro-people. People have turned to social media as a platform to voice discontent on issues such as budget cuts to education and political instability. This phenomenon demonstrates growing public awareness of the right to express opinions and criticize the government. Some public figures see the #KaburAjaDulu movement as a positive call for young people to seek experience and opportunities abroad. By going abroad, it is hoped that they can grow, gain new skills, and eventually make more meaningful contributions to Indonesia. However, it is important to ensure that this process is carried out legally and with proper planning to avoid future complications.

On the other hand, there are concerns that the phenomenon could lead to an exodus of young Indonesian talent. If large numbers of young people choose to leave Indonesia, it could negatively impact the country's development and the growth of its human resources. For this reason, the public hopes the government can create more conducive conditions that motivate youth to contribute to the nation.

=== Foreign media ===
The #KaburAjaDulu phenomenon has attracted some international media attention. Foreign outlets highlighted the movement as a reflection of public frustration over various issues in Indonesia, prompting the younger generation to consider relocating to other countries. International observers such as Yanuar Nugroho, a Visiting Senior Fellow at the Yusof Ishak Institute (ISEAS) in Singapore, observed that the #KaburAjaDulu phenomenon is a response from Indonesian youth who feel that living conditions in the country are increasingly deteriorating, difficult, uncertain, and unclear.

== See also ==
- Indonesian diaspora
- 2025 Indonesian Protests

=== International ===
- Venezuelan refugee crisis
- Vietnamese boat people
- Cuban exiles
