= 2020 Surakarta mayoral election =

Local elections in Central Java, Indonesia

- 9 December 2020
- Registered: 418,283
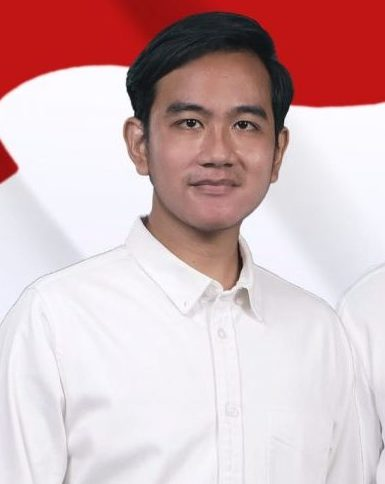

| Nominee | Gibran Rakabuming | Bagyo Wahyono |
| Party | PDI-P | Independent |
| Running mate | Teguh Prakosa | F. X. Supardjo |
| Popular vote | 225,419 | 35,113 |
| Percentage | 86.5% | 13.5% |
Mayor before election
F. X. Hadi Rudyatmo
PDI-P
Elected mayor
Gibran Rakabuming
PDI-P

The 2020 Surakarta mayoral election was held on 9 December 2020, as part of the 2020 simultaneous local elections across Indonesia. The mayoral seat was contested between Gibran Rakabuming Raka and independent candidate Bagyo Wahyono.

== Candidates ==
There were two candidates running in the election:

- Gibran Rakabuming Raka, businessman and eldest son of President Joko Widodo, running as a PDI-P candidate,
- Bagyo Wahyono, a tailor, running as an independent candidate.

=== Nominations ===
The local office of PDI-P initially appeared to be intent on nominating Surakarta's deputy mayor Achmad Purnomo for the mayoral race, but Gibran entered the race through the provincial branch of the party, and the central board of the party itself eventually opted to nominate Gibran, alongside Teguh Prakosa who was the party's secretary in Surakarta. Achmad himself had also previously made statements regarding his intention to withdraw his mayoral nomination. The incumbent mayor F. X. Hadi Rudyatmo had previously endorsed Purnomo, but accepted Gibran's nomination.

Bagyo was accepted as an independent candidate after collecting enough support in form of ID card submissions numbering 38,831, in excess of the 35,870 required to be accepted. His candidacy was based on grassroots support by the Tikus Pithi Hanoto Baris organization. His running mate, FX Supardjo, served as the head of a local rukun warga community.

== Campaign ==
Along with other elections in the 2020 local elections, face-to-face campaigning which could result in large crowds are explicitly prohibited by the General Elections Commission (KPU), due to the ongoing COVID-19 pandemic. However, Wahyono's campaign team stated that they would continue to conduct their campaigning offline, citing the effectivity of such methods compared to online campaigns, and supporters of both candidates formed sizeable crowds during both candidates' registration to the KPU office.

Public debates were held between the two candidates on 6 November and 23 November 2020.

== Results ==
| Candidate | Votes | Percentage |
|---|---|---|
| Gibran Rakabuming | 225,419 | 86.5% |
| Bagyo Wahyono | 35,113 | 13.5% |
| Total | 260,532 | 100% |

Source: General Elections Commission
