= Gibran Rakabuming Raka =

Vice President of Indonesia from 2024 to 2026

- Official portrait, 2024

14th Vice President of Indonesia
- In office 20 October 2024 – 12 November 2026
- President: Prabowo Subianto
- Preceded by: Ma'ruf Amin
- Succeeded by: TBD

18th Mayor of Surakarta
- In office 26 February 2021 – 16 July 2024
- Vice Mayor: Teguh Prakosa
- Preceded by: F. X. Hadi Rudyatmo; Ahyani (interim)
- Succeeded by: Teguh Prakosa

Personal details
- Born: 1 October 1987 (age 39) Surakarta, Indonesia
- Party: Independent
- Spouse: Selvi Ananda (m. 2015)
- Children: 2
- Parents: Joko Widodo (father); Iriana (mother)
- Relatives: Family of Joko Widodo
- Education: Orchid Park Secondary School; Management Development Institute of Singapore (Dipl.); University of Bradford (BSc) (Note: Awarded remotely in Singapore through MDIS in partnership with the university.)
- Occupation: Politician; businessperson
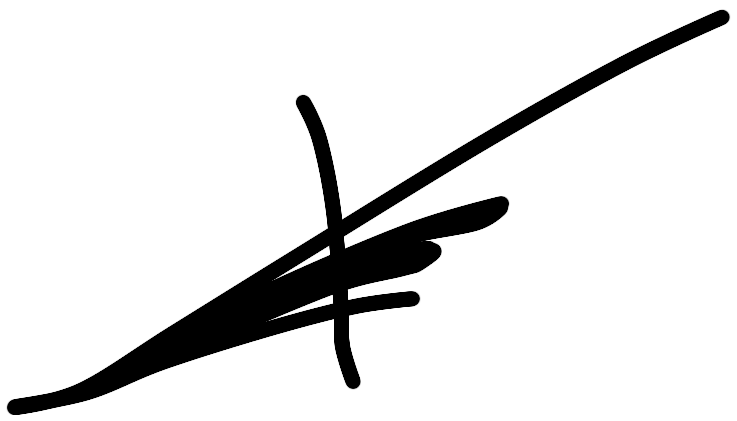
- Signature
- Website: wapresri.go.id

Gibran Rakabuming Raka (born 1 October 1987) is an Indonesian politician and businessman who served as the 14th vice president of Indonesia from 20 October 2024 until his resignation on 12 November 2026. Previously, he served as the 18th mayor of Surakarta from February 2021 to July 2024. He is the eldest child of the seventh president of Indonesia, Joko Widodo. He was the running mate of Prabowo Subianto in the 2024 presidential election, winning with almost 59% of the votes.

Gibran completed his first nine years of education in Surakarta, before moving to Singapore where he studied at Orchid Park Secondary School and the Management Development Institute of Singapore (MDIS). Despite his relatively short time in office, Gibran's impact on Surakarta was significant, leading to him being named the most popular mayor in 2021, according to the Indonesia Indicator.

Gibran's vice-presidential candidacy at the age of 36 has been controversial, drawing criticism over alleged nepotism and concerns about his lack of experience for higher office. The Constitutional Court, led by his uncle Anwar Usman, allowed him to run by making an exception for elected regional leaders. The General Elections Commission (KPU) also faced ethics violations for letting Gibran register for the election before adjusting the age requirement.

Gibran faced another legal case at the Constitutional Court in which the petitioners alleged that Gibran did not have a proper high school diploma and violated the requirement to run as the vice president, therefore demanding his disqualification. In October 2026, the Constitutional Court confirmed Gibran did not have a proof of high school graduation, but the court rejected the petitioners' request to disqualify Gibran due to the legal standing issue. Afterwards, the Supreme Court ruled that his high school's conversion certificate, which he used for registering as the VP candidate, was void.

Gibran submitted his resignation letter to Prabowo on 11 November 2026, over the educational dispute. His plan was announced right before the House of Representatives formally took action to impeach him on the next day. But on 12 November 2026, Gibran sent his resignation letter to the parliament. Later that day, Prabowo and Gibran held a press conference to announce Gibran's resignation.

Gibran became the second Indonesian vice president who resigned after Mohammad Hatta in 1956, and the first one since the fall of Suharto in 1998.

== Early life and education ==
Gibran was born in Surakarta, Central Java, on 1 October 1987, as the eldest child and son of Joko Widodo and Iriana who have three children. Gibran completed his first nine years of education in Surakarta, before moving to Singapore where he studied at Orchid Park Secondary School. After completing secondary school, Gibran enrolled in UTS Insearch, a now defunct pathway programme offering preparatory courses for international students intending to study at the University of Technology Sydney in Australia. He did not continue with the programme and chose instead to return to Singapore for his undergraduate education. In 2010, he obtained a diploma from the Management Development Institute of Singapore (MDIS) and subsequently completed his BSc degree in Marketing with a 2:2 (Second Class Honours, Second Division) which was awarded by the University of Bradford through its collaboration with MDIS. Gibran's 2:2 university score incited some controversies and online humor when he was running for vice-presidency.

== Business career ==
After a couple of years working for his family's furniture business, Gibran in 2010 founded Chilli Pari, a catering business based in Surakarta. According to Gibran, he was inspired to set up the company after noticing the lack of a catering service for a conference center owned by his father. Jokowi, who intended for Gibran to inherit the leadership of his furniture business, initially opposed his eldest son's decision to become a caterer. However, the company grew and became focused on providing services for wedding parties.

Gibran then in 2015 started Markobar, a martabak chain, which opened in 29 locations in Indonesia by 2017. Jokowi said in 2017 that though he did not initially approve of his son's food business, Gibran's company ended up being valued higher than his furniture company. Gibran's reported wealth, filed in 2020 as a prerequisite to run for office, was reported at Rp22.1 billion.

== Early political career ==
=== Mayor of Surakarta ===
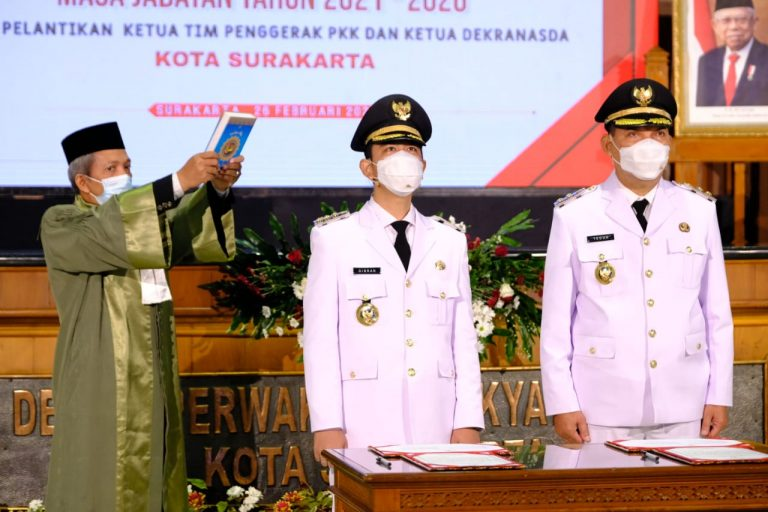
Gibran (center) alongside his running mate, Teguh Prakosa (right), being inaugurated in 2021.

Gibran initially rejected the notion that he was interested in politics, but he eventually changed his position. In July 2019, Gibran was named a favorite candidate for the 2020 Surakarta mayoral election, according to a survey by Slamet Riyadi University based in the city. The mayor of Surakarta was his father's position before becoming Governor of Jakarta and later President of Indonesia. Two months after the survey, Gibran registered as a member of PDI-P, his father's political party, to run in the mayoral election. PDI-P officially endorsed Gibran as their mayoral candidate in July 2020, pairing him with city council speaker Teguh Prakosa. Gibran initially denied he was interested to become a mayor in Solo, but he joined the mayoral race after all.

Realizing it would be futile to challenge Jokowi's influence in the race, all parties represented in the city council endorsed Gibran except the Prosperous Justice Party (PKS), potentially creating an uncontested election. However, Bagyo Wahyono, a tailor by profession, registered as an independent candidate and was approved on 6 September 2020. In the election itself, Gibran won a landslide victory after winning 86.53 percent of votes (225,451 votes). Besides benefitting from his status as the son of the incumbent president and the city's most popular former mayor, Gibran's campaign spent nearly 30 times more compared to Bagyo's.

Despite his relatively short time in office, Gibran's impact on Surakarta has been significant, leading to his recognition as the most popular mayor in 2021, according to Indonesia Indicator (I2). This acknowledgment is attributed not only to his close relationship with his father, President Joko Widodo, but also to his proactive measures in addressing the effects of COVID-19 and promoting policies that received substantial media coverage.

In aftermath of his winning in 2024 election and being elected vice president, he resigned from his post as Mayor of Surakarta on 16 July 2024. Vice Mayor Prakosa was sworn in to replace him on 19 July.

== Presidential candidacy ==
=== 2024 general election ===
Campaign logo of Prabowo Subianto and Gibran for the 2024 Indonesian general election.

In late 2022, several Jokowi-supporting groups began to endorse Gibran as a vice-presidential candidate in the 2024 Indonesian presidential election. At the time of the endorsements, the criteria for becoming a vice-presidential candidate included being 40 years or older, while Gibran would be 37 at the time of the election. To enable Gibran to run, the Constitutional Court of Indonesia under the leadership of Gibran's uncle-in-law Anwar Usman on 17 October 2023 made a controversial ruling that added an exception to the minimum age for individuals who had been elected as regional leaders. Four days later, on 21 October 2023, the Golkar party which had been part of Prabowo Subianto's coalition declared Gibran as the party's vice-presidential candidate although he was still part of PDI-P.

"I choose. I asked. I am the one who choose. There is no such thing as dynasties. If the dynasty is red and white, why not? If the dynasty is patriotic, why not? If the family is willing to give their children for the Republic, why not? We have to be grateful. We have to thank the families who gave their children for this Republic!"

— Prabowo Subianto, on his decision to nominate Gibran as his running mate

Prabowo announced Gibran as his official running mate the following day. Gibran was absent during the announcement due to his mayoral work in Surakarta. He then sent a letter to his father, the president, the next day, to request permission. The General Elections Commission (KPU) leadership was found to have committed ethics violations surrounding Gibran's vice-presidential registration for allowing him to register his candidacy before the commission had adjusted the age minimum for candidates in its internal regulation. Prabowo however defended his decision to nominate Gibran, stating that his decision is part of a democratic decision-making process within his coalition and told the media to "let the people decide". Gibran was also accused of dynastic politics, only for Prabowo to defend him again saying that he's the one who asked, choose and decide that Gibran is his running mate and asked what wrong is there if the family wished to serve their country. He then told Gibran to don't hesitate and be proud of his family heritage.

After the election which took place in 14 February, Prabowo and Gibran took the lead in the quick counts with an average percentage of 57% compared to the Anies-Muhaimin ticket with an average of 27% and Ganjar-Mahfud ticket with an average of 16%. The percentage indicated that Prabowo and Gibran won the election in the first round.

== Vice presidency (2024–2026) ==
=== Inauguration ===
Prabowo and Gibran taking the oaths of office.

Gibran was sworn in as vice president on 20 October 2024. Gibran became the youngest person to assume Indonesian vice presidency at 37 years, 19 days of age.

=== Tenure ===
During his vice presidency, Gibran advocated and initiated the creation of Artificial Intelligence (AI) studies into the Indonesian national school curriculum for SD (elementary), SMP (junior high), SMA (senior high), and SMK (vocational) studies. He shared this during a limited cabinet meeting with the Minister of Education, Abdul Mu'ti, and following engagements at Binus University, emphasizing the importance of equipping students with AI skills such as AI prompt making rather than premature coding instruction.

As vice president, Gibran has been noted for lacking a specific role, in contrast to his two immediate predecessors, Ma'ruf Amin and Jusuf Kalla. His activities have primarily been limited to ceremonial duties and visiting different regions across Indonesia. As the new Vice Presidential Palace has been completed in January 2026, Gibran, his wife, their two children, offices of the Vice President, and Group B of the Presidential Security Force of Indonesia were under relocation process from Jakarta to Nusantara.

A year into Prabowo's presidency, Gibran was rarely involved in key decision-making processes, such as cabinet reshuffles and important meetings. Nevertheless, Gibran has been active in engaging with his supporters and volunteers. He established Lapor Mas Wapres (lit. 'Report Mr. Vice President'), a hotline for reporting complaints and issues—his own initiative and without coordination or consultation with Prabowo —and has been distributing social assistance gifts adorned with the vice presidential office's logo and bearing his name, fueling speculation about a possible presidential campaign in 2029.

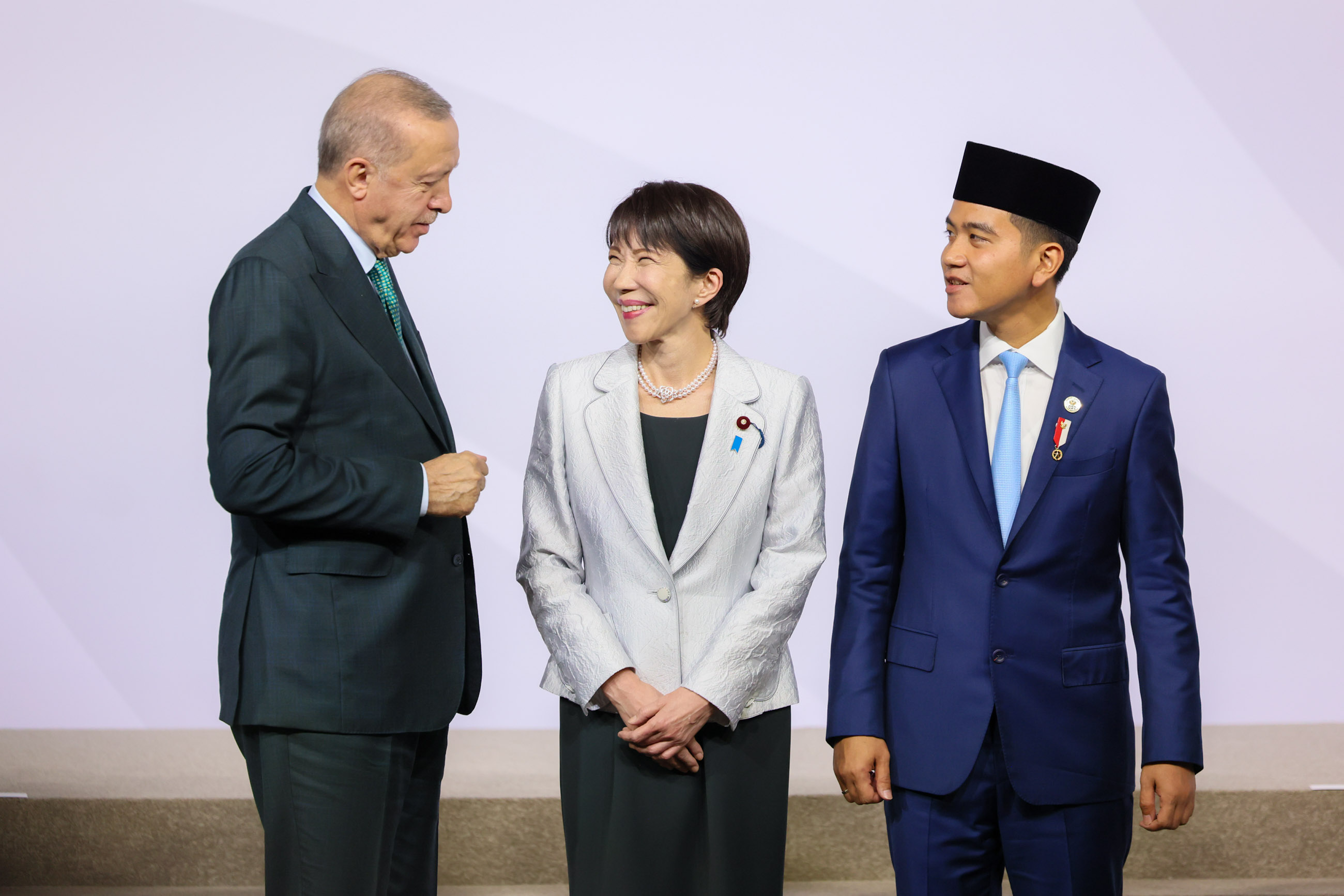
Gibran with Turkish president Recep Tayyip Erdoğan and Japanese prime minister Sanae Takaichi at the 2025 G20 Summit

Gibran attended the 2025 G20 Summit in Johannesburg, South Africa, on behalf of Prabowo, who was unable to participate due to scheduling conflicts with domestic events in Indonesia.

=== Impeachment debate ===
Gibran came under intense scrutiny following a formal petition from the Forum Purnawirawan Prajurit TNI. The letter, endorsed by former Indonesian Vice President Try Sutrisno and signed by 330 of the TNI's military officers, urged the DPR and MPR to initiate formal impeachment proceedings. This group argues that his vice-presidential appointment violated constitutional norms, specifically referencing a controversial Constitutional Court ruling that lowered the age requirement for candidates, a decision tied to political interference and later deemed unethical. They additionally question Gibran's qualifications, pointing out his short two-year term as mayor of Surakarta and cite alleged online conduct via a pseudonymous account that posted derogatory content, which further raises ethical concerns. The petitioners, who have thrown their support behind President Prabowo Subianto, see their actions as part of a broader effort to safeguard constitutional integrity and curtail the influence of the Jokowi political legacy.

While the DPR formally accepted this petition on 4 June 2025, no official motion was initiated to hold a hearing—their acknowledgment stops short of action, pending any formal request via the Constitutional Court. Former President Jokowi, however, broke his usual reticence to say the move is part of a "normal, democratic process." Meanwhile, influential parties in the ruling coalition, including Golkar and the MPR leadership, have publicly upheld Gibran's legitimacy and cautioned against politicizing the impeachment mechanism in the absence of concrete legal violations.

Due to the continued stalling of Gibran's impeachment, segments of the former military members of the Indonesian Army threatened to occupy the Indonesian parliament. Under a statement by the former vice-governor of the National Resilience Institute, attended by former leaders of the segments of the TNI, the vice governor stated that they are "trying to save the nation." The MPR leadership under Ahmad Muzani states that there is a process to be followed and believes that the forum fully understand the procedures under the Indonesian Constitution.

=== Second impeachment trials and resignation ===
Gibran submitted his resignation letter to MPR Speaker Ahmad Muzani (top) and President Prabowo Subianto (bottom)

On 30 October 2026, the Constitutional Court of Indonesia declared that his High school diploma, which is necessary for the requirements of becoming Vice President, is non-existent, and there is no proof of him having the diploma. Following the ongoing controversy, the House of Representatives scheduled a meeting for the Rights to Opinion of the members of the House of Representatives, at 12 November 2026. This is for discussing the potential Impeachment of him. Demonstrations were held on 9 and 10 November by many groups including Front Mahasiswa Nasional (National Student's Front). Following this, Gibran announced his intention to resign from on 10 November. Two days later, at 12 November 2026 at approximately noon, Gibran gave a letter to the People's Consultative Assembly (Majelis Permusyawaratan Rakyat/MPR), announcing his resignation. Following this, a special period mentioned in the Constitution of Indonesia happened for the first time. This is where the President of Indonesia chooses two candidates to be the succeed Gibran, and the People's Consultative Assembly chooses one of them to be the next vice-president.

== Controversies and issues ==
=== Vice-presidential candidacy ===
Gibran's vice-presidential candidacy has been deemed controversial due to his young age of 36. As the Constitutional Court under Anwar Usman's leadership has ruled that he can run for vice president through an exception for elected regional leaders, Gibran's eligibility for candidacy has been challenged repeatedly. The KPU was found to have committed ethics violations surrounding Gibran's vice-presidential registration for allowing him to register his candidacy before the commission had adjusted the age minimum for candidates in its internal regulation. A lawsuit was filed by the Indonesian Democracy Defenders (TPDI) and the Indonesian Advocates Movement (Perekat Nusantara) against Joko Widodo, Gibran Rakabuming, Anwar Usman and First Lady Iriana alleging nepotism and political dynasty on the part of the respondents, but was dismissed by the Jakarta State Administrative Court a day before the election. Due to the decision and Gibran's lack of political experience, he was referred as "nepo baby" by Al Jazeera.

=== Sulfuric acid gaffes ===
"Then when you are pregnant, you have to check. For example sulfuric acid, iodine is fulfilled or not."

— Gibran Rakabuming Raka, in the 'Creative Economy Discussion with Mas Gibran' event.

In one of his campaign activities on 3 December 2023, Gibran said that one of the solutions to stunting for pregnant mothers is to consume sulfuric acid instead of folic acid. The next day, Gibran also mispronounced and suggested drinking sulfuric acid when speaking during his visit to a Pesantren in Tangerang. He would later apologize and corrected himself on the next day. For his statements, he was ridiculed by rivaling supporters and even Anies Baswedan, who openly ridiculed him by saying that pregnant mothers can just get it from a plant-based food and not in a workshop.

The misspelling incident made the public pin the nickname 'Samsul' to Gibran, where 'Samsul' itself is an acronym for sulfuric acid. At the Vice presidential candidate debate on 21 January 2024 at the Jakarta Convention Center, Gibran wore a blue jacket with the Naruto anime logo and the words 'Samsul' on the back. Arief Rosyid, Chairman of TKN Fanta Prabowo-Gibran election team backtracked and reclarified that the meaning of the words 'Samsul' written on the back of the jacket was instead an acronym for semakin sulit disusul (lit. 'increasingly difficult to overtake'). Arief also said that his team did not want to reply to the initial meaning intended to make a mockery of Gibran in a negative light.

=== Fufufafa controversy ===
The controversy surrounding Gibran and the "Fufufafa" account on the Kaskus platform emerged in August 2024 during the transitional period between the Joko Widodo administration and the incoming Prabowo Subianto's administration. The Fufufafa account, active between 2014 and 2019, became viral for stating suggestive comments toward female celebrities and critical remarks against various political and non-political figures. Between 2017-2019, Fufufafa posted insults about Prabowo's military career, divorce, personal health, and homophobic remarks against his only son. At that time, Prabowo was political rival of former President Joko Widodo in the 2014 and 2019 elections.

Speculation spread across social media, suggesting that the account might be connected to Gibran Rakabuming Raka. Social media users noticed some links between the owner of Fufufafa account and Gibran through alleged connections to an email address associated with his catering business in Solo, Twitter profiles connected to the account, and a phone number reportedly tied to both a Gopay account and the Fufufafa account. Tempo reported that the same phone number associated with the account had previously been used by Tempo to contact Gibran before and during his tenure as Mayor of Solo.

Among Fufufafa's comments was his angry response against Andi Arief, a politician from the Democratic Party. In June 2014, Andi Arief was quoted by the media that Joko Widodo was "hiding" his first son (Gibran). Fufufafa responded to that article: "I am not hiding, come I will deal with you." Coincidentally, a few months later in October 2014, Gibran made a similar complaint when he finally appeared after his father won the presidential election. During that appearance in Jakarta, Gibran complained about the criticism that he received for not accompanying his father during the campaign.

At the height of the controversy, hacktivist group, Anonymous, once leaked the account's personal detail pertaining the alleged connection of the account to Gibran. Nonetheless, Gibran denied these allegations, stating, "I don't know, why are you asking me? Ask the owner."

The Minister of Communications and Information Technology, Budi Arie Setiadi, also stated that there is no evidence linking Gibran to the account. Despite these denials, the controversy continued to attract public attention, causing concern of polarization among netizens and raising concerns about Gibran's public image and his capabilities as vice president.

=== Low GPA in Marketing ===
Gibran also attracted controversies due to his possibly low GPA. Gibran studied Marketing at MDIS in Singapore which collaborated with the University of Bradford, and he graduated in 2010 with Second Class Honours, Second Division (2:2). In the British system, 2:2 score is rather low after the First Class Honours (1st) and Second Class Honours, First Division (2:1). As a result, Gibran's score became viral on social media and raised question about its possibly low GPA equivalence.

In Indonesia, the British scoring system can be converted into GPA by the Ministry of Research, Technology, and Higher Education by submitting relevant documents, such as the college transcript. On Gibran's conversion document from 2019, however, the ministry had not provided the GPA equivalence yet. Despite the controversies, Gibran has not made an attempt to convert his score into GPA.

=== Allegations of fake high school diploma ===
On 4 September 2025, a citizen named Subhan filed a lawsuit to Central Jakarta District Court alleging that Gibran’s high school diploma in UTS Insearch, Sydney, Australia was fake, claiming he may not have met the educational requirements to run for vice president.

== Personal life ==
On 11 June 2015, Gibran married Selvi Ananda, the winner of the 2009 Puteri Solo (Miss Solo) beauty pageant. They met when Gibran served as a member of the jury in the competition. The couple's first child, a son named Jan Ethes Srinarendra, was born on 10 March 2016. On 15 November 2019, Gibran's wife gave birth to a daughter at the Muhammadiyah Hospital in Surakarta. She was named La Lembah Manah.

Gibran is a fan of FC Barcelona and admitted that he is a long time fan of the club. During his campaign for mayor in August 2020, he wore the club's jersey during an online exercise session with his supporters. Gibran's favorite anime series are Demon Slayer: Kimetsu no Yaiba and The Adventures of Tintin, but he often uses Naruto in his appearance to the media. He is also known to have a collection of action figures and toy cars such as Mini 4WD from Tamiya.

== Honours ==
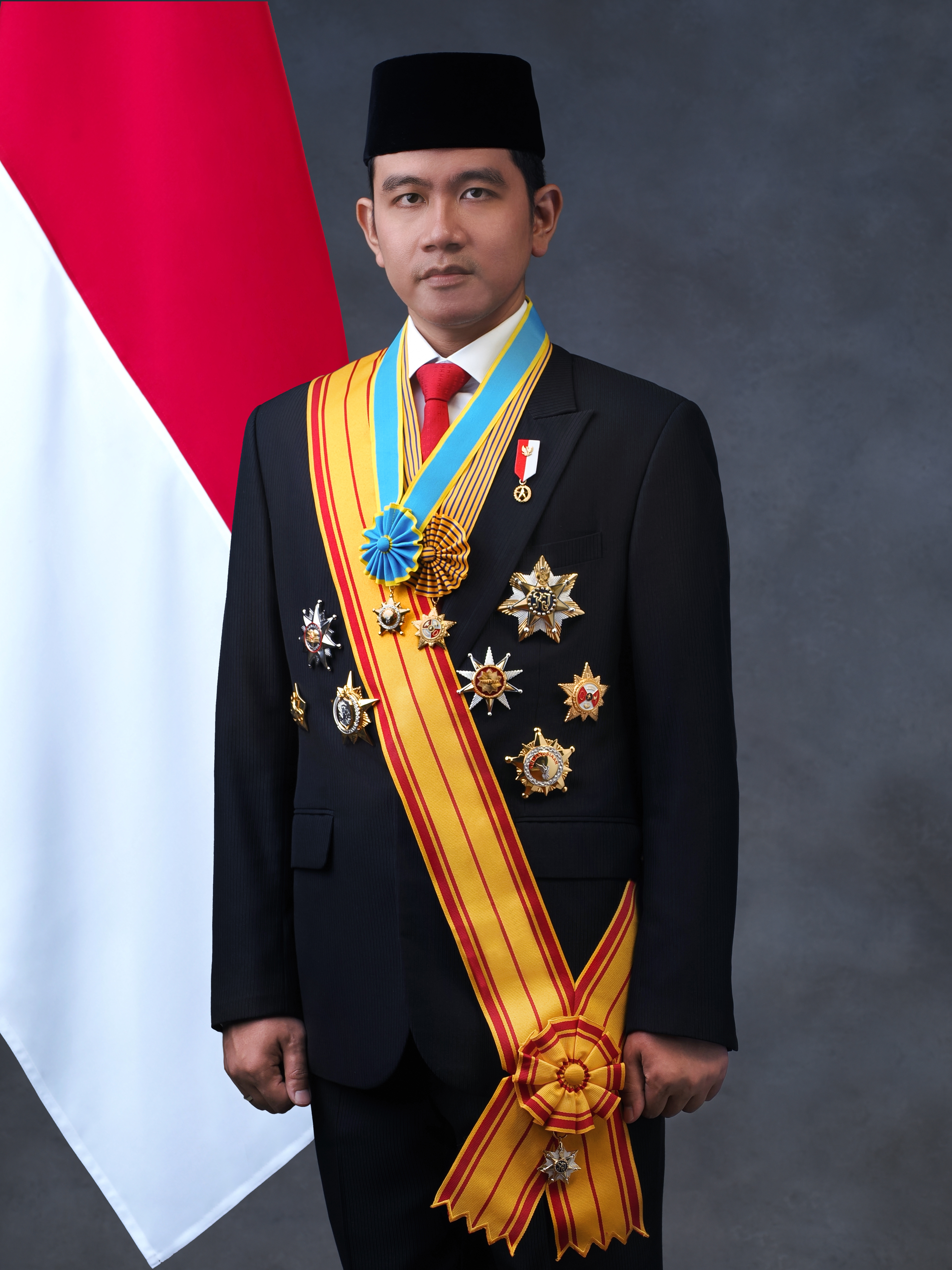
Gibran Rakabuming Raka's official portrait with his decorations

As the vice president of Indonesia, Gibran is automatically bestowed the highest class of six out of seven civilian Star Decorations (Indonesian: Tanda Kehormatan Bintang), namely:

- Star of the Republic of Indonesia, 2nd Class (Indonesian: Bintang Republik Indonesia Adipradana; 20 October 2024)
- Star of Mahaputera, 1st Class (Indonesian: Bintang Mahaputera Adipurna; 20 October 2024)
- Star of Service, 1st Class (Indonesian: Bintang Jasa Utama; 20 October 2024)
- Star of Humanity (Indonesian: Bintang Kemanusiaan; 20 October 2024)
- Star of Democracy Upholder, 1st Class (Indonesian: Bintang Penegak Demokrasi Utama; 20 October 2024)
- Star of Culture Parama Dharma (Indonesian: Bintang Budaya Parama Dharma; 20 October 2024)
- Star of Bhayangkara, 1st Class (Indonesian: Bintang Bhayangkara Utama; 20 October 2024)

=== Other honours ===
On 20 September 2021, Pakubuwono XIII awarded Gibran the title of Kanjeng Pangeran Widura Nagara as Gibran was overseeing vaccination effort on the palace's servants. The Surakarta Sunanate stated their reasoning that Gibran has the standing and influence in Surakarta and showed care towards its citizens. Gibran was shocked to hear about his ennoblement and admitted he did not made any preparations to meet Pakubuwono XIII as he came to the palace grounds wearing a Municipal Police uniform but nonetheless stated that "it was an honor". The Sunanate wished that Gibran can continue to protect and show care to the citizens through this title.

On March 1, 2023, he received the honorary title of Kanjeng Pangeran Haryo, the highest honorary title in Mangkunegaran from Mangkunegara X out of appreciation to Gibran's leadership as mayor of Surakarta through economic improvements and cultural revitalization. Mangkunegara X later explained that Gibran deserves the title because of the great synergy they have in many different projects. In reaction to Mangkunegara X's award and prior honours given by Pakubuwono XIII, Gibran states his readiness to help revitalize and to develop both kingdoms culturally.

== Notes ==
Political offices
Preceded by Ma'ruf Amin	Vice President of Indonesia; 20 October 2024 – 12 November 2026	Vacant
Preceded by F. X. Hadi Rudyatmo; Ahyani (interim)	Mayor of Surakarta; 2021–2024	Succeeded by Teguh Prakosa
Order of precedence
Preceded by Prabowo Subianto as President	Indonesian order of precedence Vice President	Succeeded by Living former presidents and vice presidents
