= 2005 Surakarta mayoral election =

27 June 2005	2010 →
- Turnout: 72.3%
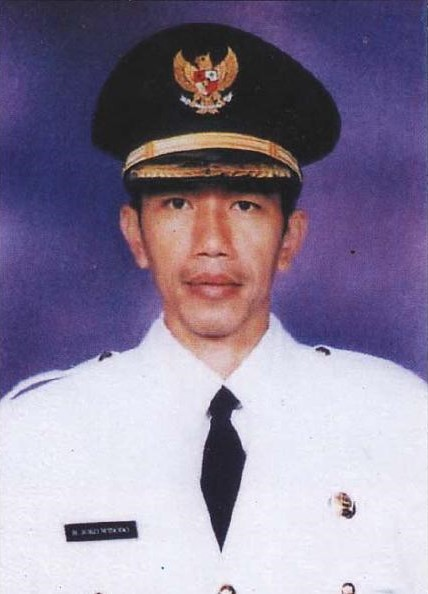

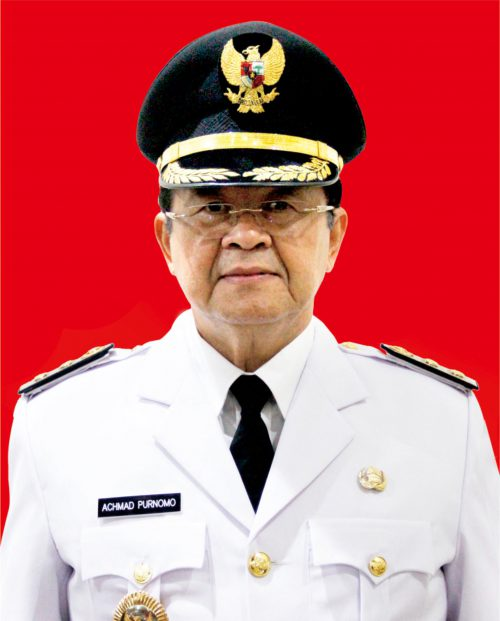
Nominee	Joko Widodo	Achmad Purnomo
Party	PDI-P	PAN
Running mate	F. X. Hadi Rudyatmo	Istar Yuliadi
Popular vote	99,747	79,213
Percentage	36.62	29.08
Mayor before election
Slamet Suryanto
PDI-P
Elected mayor
Joko Widodo
PDI-P

The 2005 Surakarta mayoral election took place on 27 June 2005, as the first direct mayoral election for the city. Four pairs of candidates for Surakarta's mayor and deputy mayor participated in the election. The election was famous because it was won by Joko Widodo, who would later become President of Indonesia in 2014.

== Background ==
Starting in 2005, as part of a decentralization process, Indonesia implemented a direct election system for local leaders (i.e. mayors, regents, and governors), replacing the previous system of election by vote within local legislatures during the New Order era. The first of such elections, initially scheduled for January 2005, were delayed to June 2005 in order to allow for preparations.

== Candidates ==
There were four pairs of candidates for the election, including former mayor Slamet Suryanto. Suryanto, who was the chairman of PDI-P's local office, had been sanctioned by his party for running instead through a coalition of small parties, as the party had instead nominated Joko Widodo, who at the time was chairman of the city's furniture-makers association. Aside from the two, there was also the Achmad Purnomo-Istar Yuliadi ticket, endorsed by the National Mandate Party, and the Hardono-Dipokusomo ticket, endorsed by a coalition of Golkar, the Democratic Party, and the Prosperous Justice Party. Additionally, the National Awakening Party also endorsed Widodo.

== Results ==
Candidate	Votes	Percentage
Joko Widodo	99,747	36.62
Achmad Purnomo	79,213	29.08
Hardono	78,989	29
Slamet Suryanto	14,414	5.29

The election was held in 1,385 polling stations across the city.
