= Joko Widodo =

President of Indonesia from 2014 to 2024

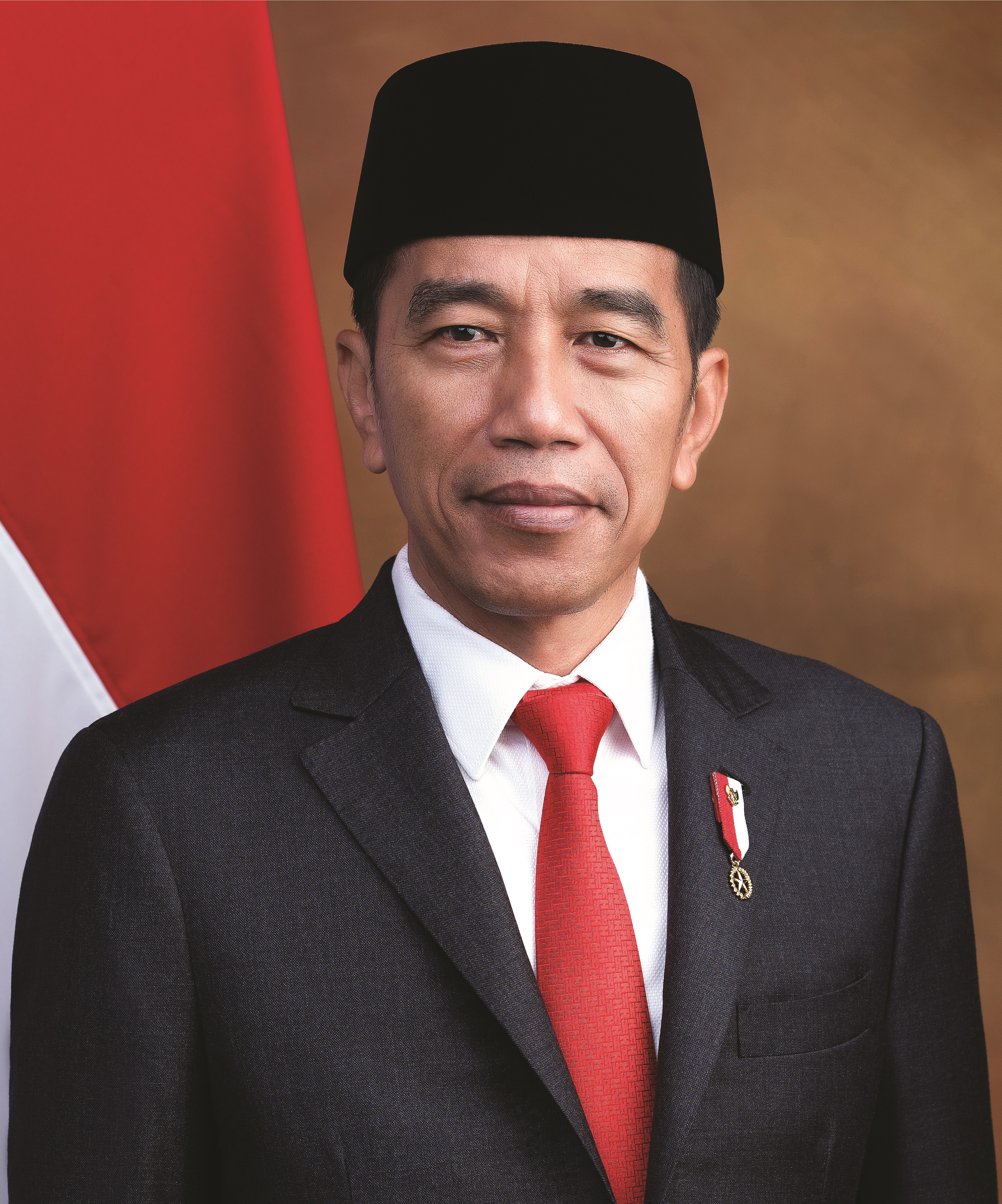
- Official portrait, 2019

7th President of Indonesia
- In office 20 October 2014 – 20 October 2024
- Vice President: Jusuf Kalla (2014–2019); Ma'ruf Amin (2019–2024)
- Preceded by: Susilo Bambang Yudhoyono
- Succeeded by: Prabowo Subianto

11th Governor of Jakarta
- In office 15 October 2012 – 16 October 2014
- Vice Governor: Basuki Tjahaja Purnama
- Preceded by: Fauzi Bowo; Fadjar Panjaitan (acting)
- Succeeded by: Basuki Tjahaja Purnama

16th Mayor of Surakarta
- In office 28 July 2005 – 1 October 2012
- Vice Mayor: F. X. Hadi Rudyatmo
- Preceded by: Slamet Suryanto
- Succeeded by: F. X. Hadi Rudyatmo

Personal details
- Born: Mulyono; 21 June 1961 (age 65) Surakarta, Indonesia
- Party: PSI (since 2025)
- Other political affiliations: PDI-P (2004–2024); Independent (2024–2025)
- Height: 175 cm (5 ft 9 in)
- Spouse: Iriana (m. 1986)
- Children: Gibran, Kaesang and Kahiyang Ayu
- Parents: Widjiatno Notomihardjo (father); Sudjiatmi (mother)
- Relatives: Widodo family
- Education: Gadjah Mada University: Engineer, Forestry
- Occupation: Politician; businessman
- Nickname: Jokowi
- Joko Widodo's voice Jokowi announcing Community Activities Restrictions Enforcement (CARE) due to the COVID-19 pandemic in Indonesia; Recorded 1 July 2021

Joko Widodo (Indonesian: [ˌd͡ʒoko wiˈdodo]; born Mulyono, Indonesian: [muˈljono]; 21 June 1961), often known mononymously as Jokowi (Indonesian: [d͡ʒoˈkowi]), is an Indonesian politician and businessman who served as the seventh President of Indonesia from 2014 to 2024. Previously a member of the Indonesian Democratic Party of Struggle (PDI-P), he was the country's first president not to emerge from the political or military elite. Before becoming president, he served as Mayor of Surakarta from 2005 to 2012 and as Governor of Jakarta from 2012 to 2014.

Born and raised in Surakarta, Widodo studied at Gadjah Mada University and later worked in the furniture industry, including as an exporter, before entering politics. As mayor of Surakarta, he gained national attention for his populist style, emphasis on urban redevelopment, and direct engagement with residents through blusukan visits. His tenure as governor of Jakarta further raised his national profile, with policies on healthcare, education, bureaucratic reform, flood mitigation, and public transport.

In the 2014 Indonesian presidential election, Widodo was nominated by the PDI-P and defeated Prabowo Subianto, before being re-elected in 2019. As president, he prioritised infrastructure development, social welfare expansion, bureaucratic reform, and economic development. His administration also pursued a pragmatic foreign policy centred on sovereignty, economic diplomacy, maritime affairs, and a more assertive response to issues such as illegal fishing and disputes in the South China Sea. Other major initiatives of his presidency included the planned relocation of Indonesia's capital to Nusantara.

Widodo's presidency has drawn both praise and criticism. Supporters have credited him with expanding infrastructure, improving public services, and maintaining political popularity, while critics pointed to his use of the death penalty, restrictions on civil liberties, weakened anti-corruption efforts, environmental controversies, and signs of democratic backsliding. His final years in office were overshadowed by accusations of political interference and dynastic politics, especially after his son Gibran Rakabuming Raka became Prabowo's running mate in the presidential election of 2024. After leaving office that year, Widodo's falling out with the PDI-P culminated in his expulsion from the party, with Widodo joining the Indonesian Solidarity Party the following year.

== Early life and education ==
Joko Widodo was born as Mulyono on 21 June 1961 at Brayat Minulya General Hospital in Surakarta, Central Java, Indonesia. Of Javanese heritage, he is the only son of Widjiatno Notomihardjo and Sudjiatmi and the eldest of four siblings. His father came from Karanganyar, while his grandparents came from a village in Boyolali. His three younger sisters are Iit Sriyantini, Idayati, and Titik Relawati. Because he was often sick as a toddler, his name was later changed—a common practice in Javanese culture—to Joko Widodo, with widodo meaning "healthy" in Javanese. At the age of 12, he began working in his father's furniture workshop. During his youth, his family lived in three different rented homes, one of which was later declared condemned by the government, an experience that strongly affected him. He later cited such experiences in developing low-income housing in Surakarta during his mayoralty.

Jokowi began his education at State Elementary School 111 Tirtoyoso, an ordinary public school. He continued at State Junior High School 1 Surakarta. He had hoped to attend State Senior High School 1 Surakarta, but his entrance-exam score was not high enough, and he instead enrolled at State Senior High School 6 in the city. When he was in college, his KKN buddies nicknamed him 'Jack'. In 1985, he graduated from Gadjah Mada University in Yogyakarta with a bachelor's degree in Forestry.

== Business career ==
After graduating from university, Widodo began working at PT Kertas Kraft Aceh (KKA), a state-owned company in Aceh, Sumatra. Between 1986 and 1988, he worked in what is now Bener Meriah Regency as a supervisor of forestry and raw materials at a Sumatran pine plantation. He soon lost interest in the company and returned home. He then worked in his grandfather's furniture factory for a year before establishing his own business, Rakabu, named after his first child. He raised his initial capital through a Rp 15 million contribution from his father and a bank loan. The company, which mainly produced teak furniture, nearly went bankrupt at one point but survived after receiving an IDR 500 million loan from Perusahaan Gas Negara. By 1991, it had begun exporting and found success in international markets. The company first entered the European market through France, and it was through a French client named Bernard who gave Joko Widodo the nickname "Jokowi".

By 2002, Widodo had become chairman of Surakarta's furniture manufacturers association. He eventually decided to enter politics and pursue reform in his hometown of Surakarta after observing the orderly layout of several European cities while promoting his furniture there. After becoming mayor, he also entered a joint venture with politician and former lieutenant general Luhut Binsar Pandjaitan, when the two founded PT Rakabu Sejahtera, combining Rakabu with Luhut's PT Toba Sejahtera.

In 2018, Jokowi reported a net worth of Rp 50.25 billion (US$3.5 million as of 2018), most of it in the form of property holdings in Central Java and Jakarta.

== Early political career ==
=== Mayor of Surakarta ===
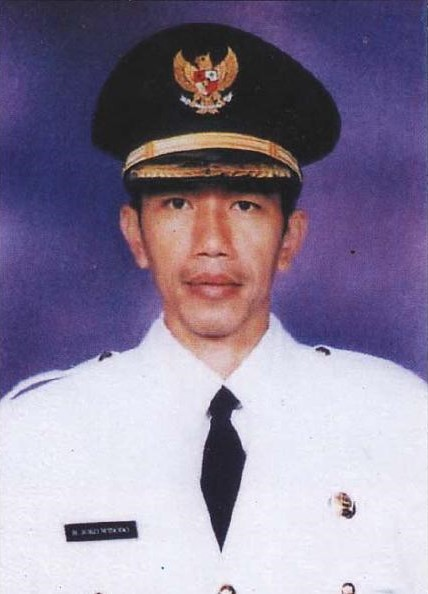
Official portrait of Joko Widodo as mayor of Surakarta, 2005

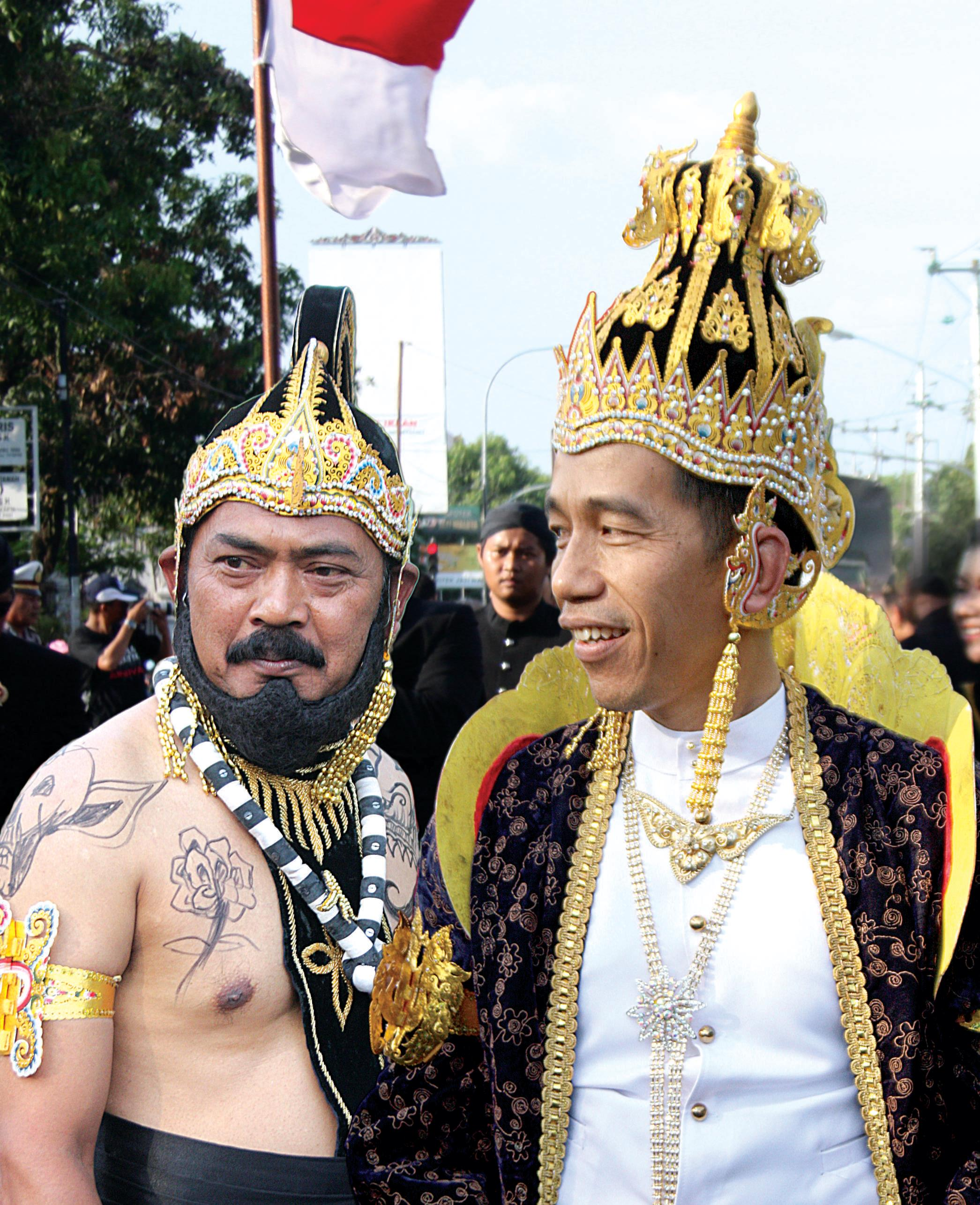
Joko Widodo and his deputy F. X. Hadi Rudyatmo in a traditional Javanese wayang wong costume, 2011

After joining PDI-P in 2004, Jokowi contested the 2005 mayoral election in Surakarta with F. X. Hadi Rudyatmo as his running mate, backed by PDI-P and the National Awakening Party. The pair won 36.62 per cent of the vote against the incumbent Slamet Suryanto and two other candidates. During the campaign, many questioned his background as a property and furniture businessman. One academic study, however, argued that his leadership style succeeded in building an interactive relationship with the public, allowing him to inspire strong trust among residents. He also adopted aspects of the development model of European cities, which he had frequently visited as a businessman, as a guide for changes in Surakarta.

His notable policies as mayor included the construction of new traditional markets and the renovation of existing ones, the creation of a 7-kilometre city walk with a 3-metre-wide pedestrian path along Surakarta's main street, the revitalisation of Balekambang and Sriwedari parks, stricter rules on cutting down trees along major roads, and the rebranding of the city as a centre of Javanese culture and tourism under the slogan "The Spirit of Java". He also promoted Surakarta as a centre for meetings, incentives, conventions and exhibitions (MICE), launched healthcare and education insurance programmes for residents, and introduced a local bus rapid transit system, Batik Solo Trans, as well as Solo Techno Park, which helped support the Esemka Indonesian car project.

It was during his tenure as mayor that he began the blusukan practice, making impromptu visits to neighbourhoods to hear residents' concerns directly, a style that later became a hallmark of his political career. He also barred family members from bidding for city projects, which he said was intended to reduce the risk of corruption. Some of his policies brought him into conflict with the then governor of Central Java, Bibit Waluyo, who at one point called Jokowi a "fool" over his opposition to a provincial construction project in Surakarta.

His supporters pointed to rapid changes in Surakarta under his leadership and to the city's branding under the motto 'Solo: The Spirit of Java'. While in office, he relocated antique stalls in Banjarsari Gardens without unrest, a move presented as part of the effort to restore the site's role as open green space. He also stressed the importance of business participation in community life and improved communication with residents through regular appearances on local television. As part of the city's rebranding, he applied for Surakarta to join the Organization of World Heritage Cities, which accepted the city in 2006, and Surakarta was later chosen to host the organisation's conference in October 2008.

In 2007, Surakarta also hosted the World Music Festival (Festival Musik Dunia/FMD) at the Fort Vastenburg complex near the city centre. The following year, the festival was held in the Mangkunegaran Palace complex.

Part of Jokowi's style was a populist, can-do approach (punya gaye) intended to build ties with a broad electorate. As mayor, he became personally involved in an incident just before Christmas 2011, when the Surakarta municipality had overdue electricity bills of nearly $1 million (IDR 8.9 billion) owed to the state-owned electricity company Perusahaan Listrik Negara (PLN). As part of a stricter policy on collecting overdue bills, PLN cut power to the city's street lights just before Christmas. The city government quickly authorised payment but also protested that PLN should have considered the public interest before acting. To reinforce the point, Jokowi made a widely publicised visit to the local PLN office to deliver the IDR 8.9 billion in cash, in the form of hundreds of bundles of banknotes and even small coins.

In 2010, he was re-elected for a second term, again with Hadi as his running mate. They won 90.09 per cent of the vote and lost in only a single polling station. He was later named Tempo magazine's 'Leader of Choice' in 2008 and received a 'Changemakers Award' from Republika in 2010. His name also began to appear in national polls for the Jakarta governorship well before PDI-P formally nominated him, including surveys by the University of Indonesia and Cyrus Network in 2011.

In 2012, after declaring his intention to run in the Jakarta gubernatorial election, Jokowi faced a smear campaign. A group calling itself the Save Solo, Save Jakarta and Save Indonesia Team (TS3) reported him to the Corruption Eradication Commission (KPK), alleging that he had facilitated the misuse of education funds by subordinates in Surakarta in 2010. The KPK investigated the allegation, found that it was based on false data, and stated that there was no indication Jokowi had misappropriated funds.

=== Governor of Jakarta ===
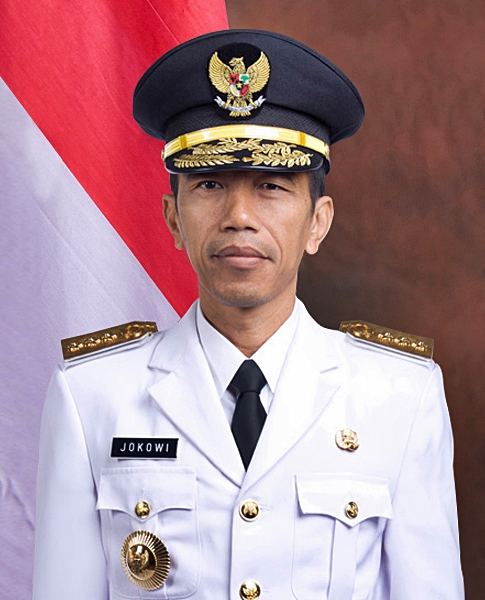
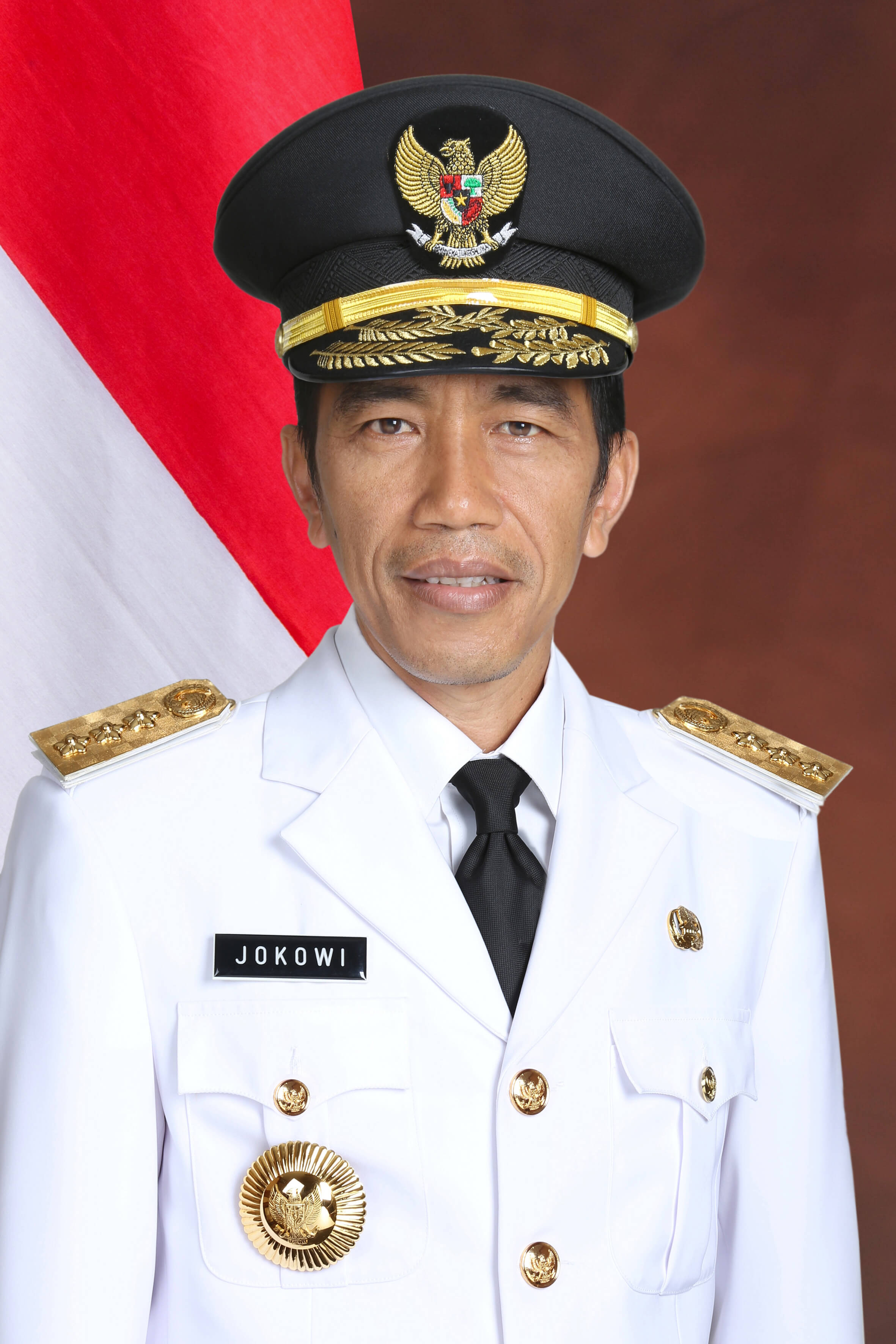
Two versions of Widodo's official portrait as governor of Jakarta, 2012

Despite disappointment among some Surakarta residents that he would not complete his second term as mayor, Jokowi ran in the 2012 Jakarta gubernatorial election and defeated the incumbent Fauzi Bowo in a runoff. His inner circle of advisers in Jakarta reportedly included figures such as F. X. Hadi 'Rudy' Rudyatmo, Sumartono Hadinoto and Anggit Nugroho, who had worked with him while he was mayor of Surakarta, as well as Basuki Tjahaja Purnama ("Ahok"), his deputy governor. Jokowi continued the blusukan style he had adopted as mayor of Surakarta by regularly visiting neighbourhoods, especially slum areas. During these visits, he wore simple informal clothes and stopped at markets or walked through narrow alleys to hear residents' concerns directly, including food prices, housing problems, flooding and transport. Polling and media coverage suggested that this hands-on approach was highly popular both in Jakarta and elsewhere in Indonesia.

After he took office, tax revenues and Jakarta's provincial budget rose significantly, from IDR 41 trillion in 2012 to IDR 72 trillion in 2014. Jokowi and Ahok both publicised their monthly salaries and the provincial budget. They also introduced programmes aimed at improving transparency, including online tax reporting, e-budgeting, e-purchasing and a cash-management system. In addition, meetings and activities attended by Jokowi and Ahok were recorded and uploaded to YouTube.

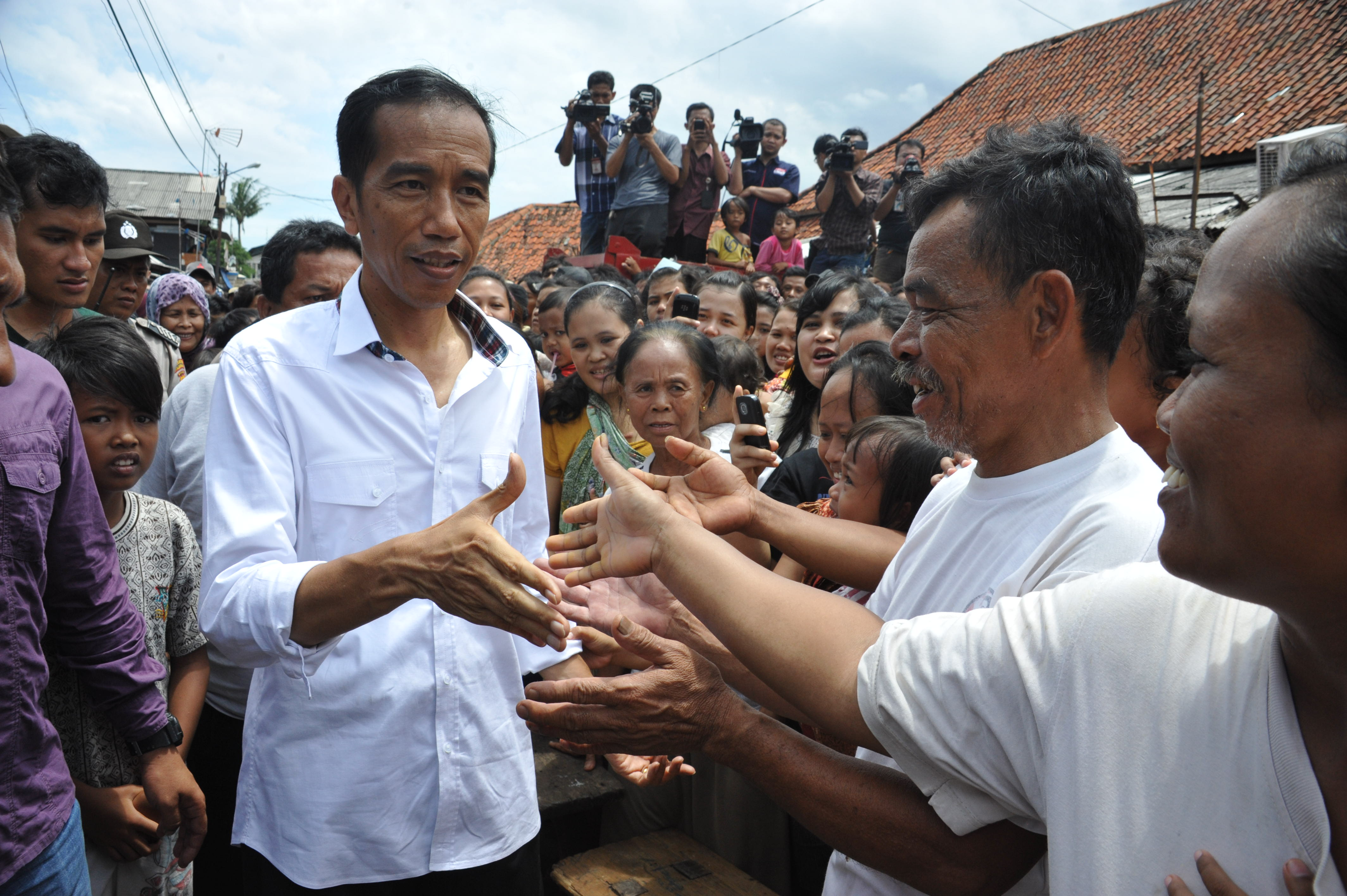
Jokowi on a blusukan neighborhood visit in Jakarta

In healthcare, Jokowi introduced the universal healthcare programme known as the 'Healthy Jakarta Card' (Kartu Jakarta Sehat, KJS). It combined an insurance scheme administered through the state-owned insurer PT Askes Indonesia (Persero) with a plan to regulate treatment charges for more than 20,000 services and procedures. The programme was criticised over confusion in its implementation and long queues, though Jokowi defended it and urged patience. In education, he launched the 'Smart Jakarta Card' (Kartu Jakarta Pintar, KJP) on 1 December 2012 to assist students from low-income families. The card provided an allowance that could be withdrawn from ATMs to pay for school needs such as books and uniforms.

Other notable policies of his administration included a bureaucratic recruitment system known as lelang jabatan (lit. 'auction of office position'), which gave civil servants an equal chance to compete for certain posts by meeting the required qualifications; efforts to regulate the chaotic concentration of street vendors in Pasar Minggu and Pasar Tanah Abang; dredging and reservoir-normalisation projects to reduce flooding; and the commencement of the long-delayed Jakarta MRT and Jakarta LRT projects. As governor, Jokowi also appointed a non-Muslim lurah (subdistrict chief) to the Muslim-majority subdistrict of Lenteng Agung despite protests from some residents. Former deputy governor Prijanto claimed that Jokowi had committed maladministration by formalising another expired certificate in relation to the BMW Park government asset certificate.

In 2013, Jokowi was reported to the National Commission on Human Rights over the eviction of squatters near Pluit. In earlier "political contracts", he had promised not to relocate residents to distant places. Jokowi met with Pluit residents and Komnas HAM to explain that the evictions were necessary to restore water catchment areas in order to reduce flooding, and that affected families were being moved to low-cost apartments.

== Elections ==
Jokowi's popularity in Indonesian politics and the economy has been termed the "Jokowi Effect". When he was declared a candidate in the 2014 presidential election, it was believed to have boosted the popularity of the Indonesian Democratic Party of Struggle to 30 per cent in the 2014 legislative election. In the capital market, the effect was also said to have boosted the Indonesian stock market and the Rupiah, as Jokowi was regarded as having a clean track record. The Jokowi Effect was likewise widely cited as a factor in Prabowo Subianto's victory in the 2024 Indonesian presidential election.

=== 2014 general election ===
Megawati Sukarnoputri nominated Jokowi as her party's presidential candidate. During the campaign, a social-media volunteer team, JASMEV, made a provocative statement threatening that Islam would not be given space in Indonesia if Jokowi won the 2014 election. The group was paid IDR 500 million to campaign for the Joko Widodo–Jusuf Kalla ticket during the election.

After quick-count results from multiple polling agencies were released, Jokowi declared victory on 9 July. His opponent Prabowo also claimed victory, creating confusion among the public. On 22 July, hours before the formal announcement of the result, Prabowo withdrew. Jokowi's victory was confirmed later that day. The General Elections Commission (KPU) gave him a narrow victory with 53.15 per cent of the vote (almost 71 million votes), against Prabowo's 46.85 per cent (62 million votes), though Prabowo's camp disputed the tally.

After his victory, Jokowi said that, having grown up under the authoritarian and corrupt New Order regime, he would never have expected someone from a lower-class background to become president. The New York Times quoted him as saying, "Now, it's quite similar to America, yeah? There is the American dream, and here we have the Indonesian dream." Jokowi was the first Indonesian president from outside the military and political elite, and political commentator Salim Said described the popular view of him as "someone who is our neighbour, who decided to get into politics and run for president."

=== 2019 general election ===
In 2018, Jokowi announced that he would run for re-election the following year. His vice president Jusuf Kalla was ineligible for another term because of the term limits on the offices of president and vice president, having already served a five-year term as vice president during Susilo Bambang Yudhoyono's first administration (2004–2009). Speculation over Jokowi's choice of running mate centred on several figures, including Mahfud MD, a former defence minister and chief justice of the Constitutional Court. In a surprise move, Jokowi announced that Ma'ruf Amin would be his running mate. Mahfud had reportedly been preparing for the vice-presidential candidacy. Ma'ruf was selected instead following pressure from several constituent parties in Jokowi's governing coalition and from influential Islamic figures. Explaining his decision, Jokowi cited Ma'ruf's long experience in government and religious affairs.

The KPU officially announced in the early hours of 21 May 2019 that the Joko Widodo–Ma'ruf Amin ticket had won the election. The official tally gave Jokowi 85 million votes (55.50 per cent) and Prabowo 68 million votes (44.50 per cent). Prabowo supporters protested the result in Jakarta, and the unrest escalated into riots that left eight people dead and more than 600 injured. Prabowo's campaign team later brought a case to the Constitutional Court, which rejected the challenge in its entirety.

== Presidency (2014–2024) ==
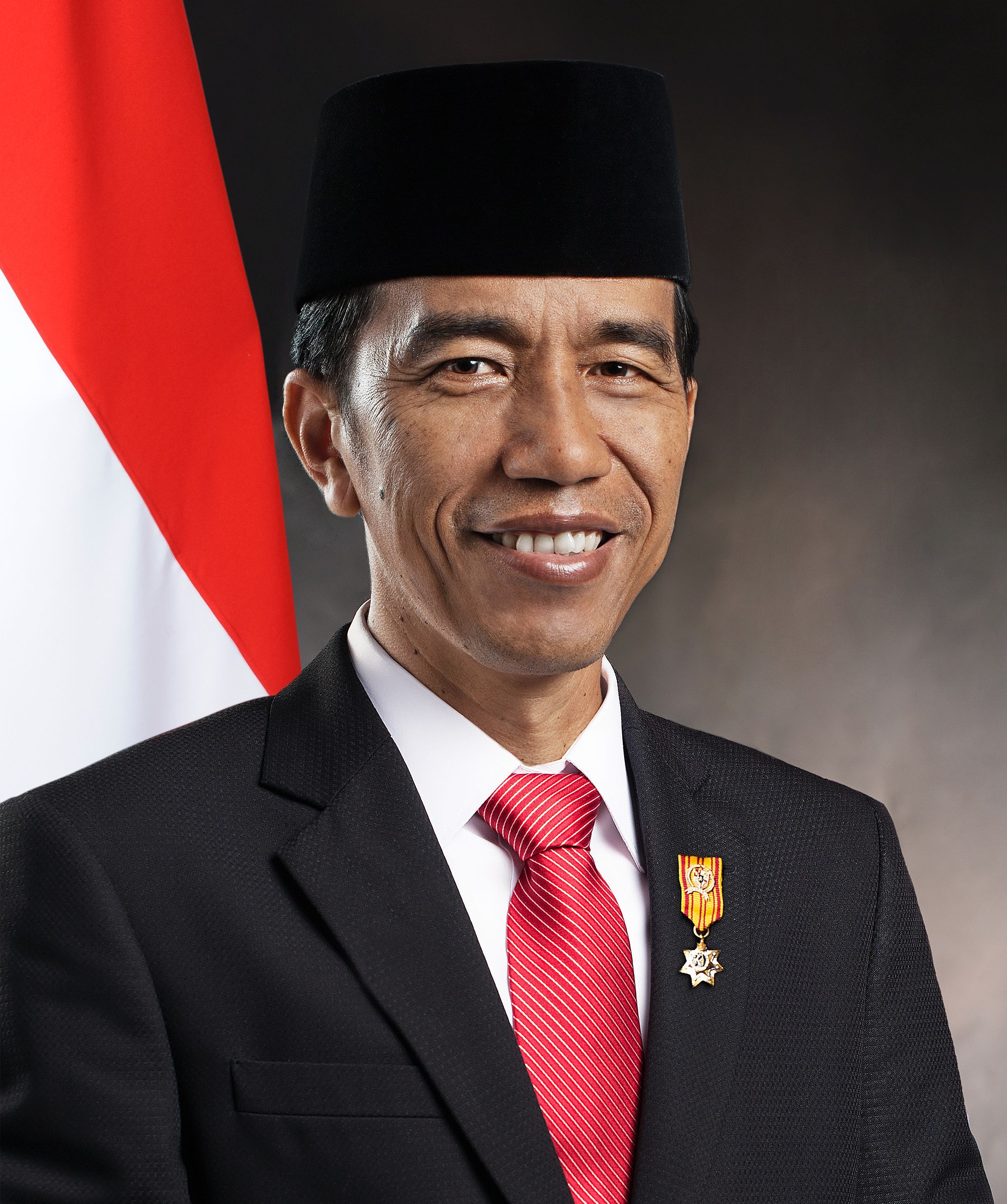
- Presidency of Joko Widodo; 20 October 2014 – 20 October 2024
- Cabinet: First Widodo Cabinet; Second Widodo Cabinet
- Party: Indonesian Democratic Party of Struggle
- Election: 2014; 2019
- Seat: Istana Negara
- Seal of the President of Indonesia

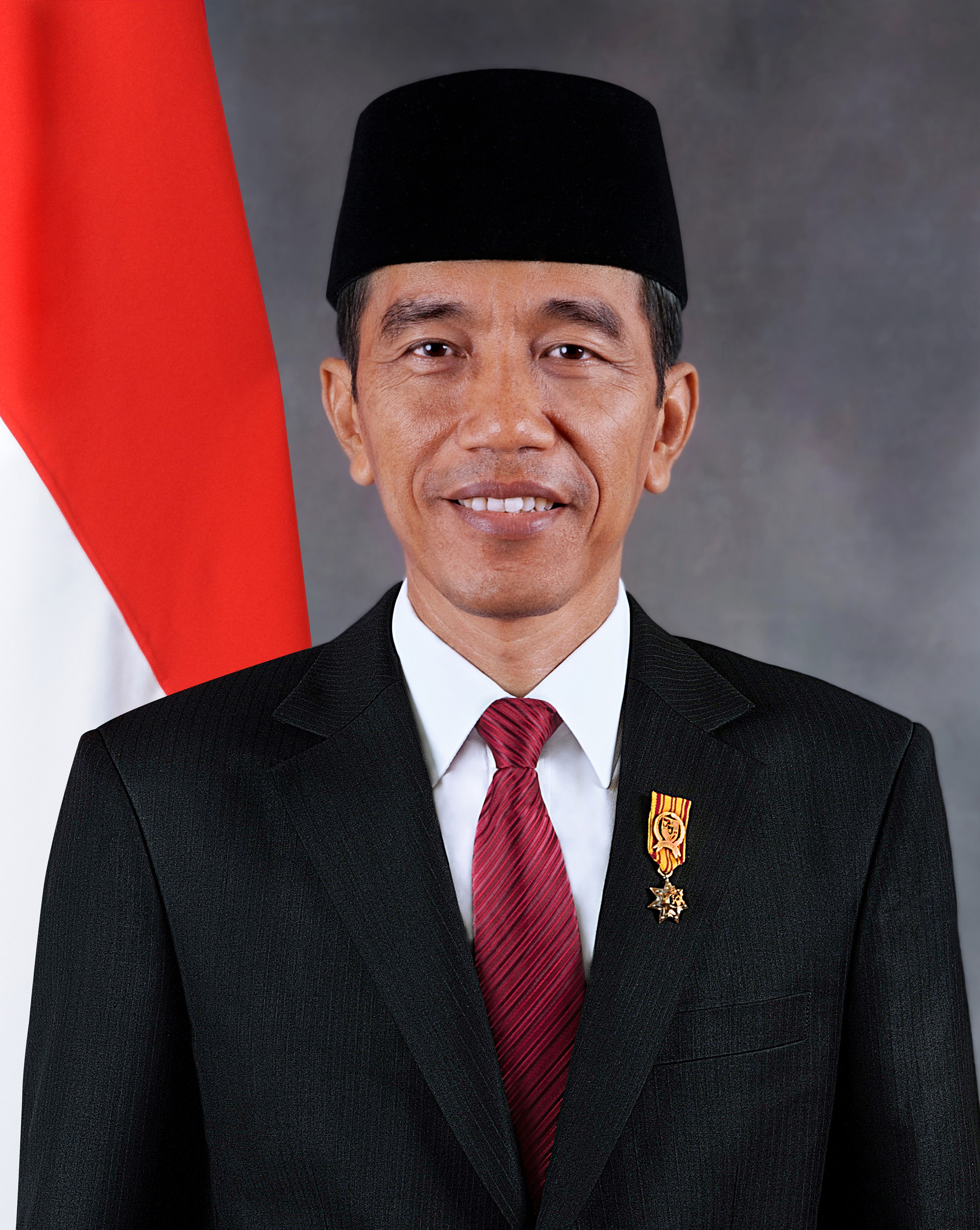
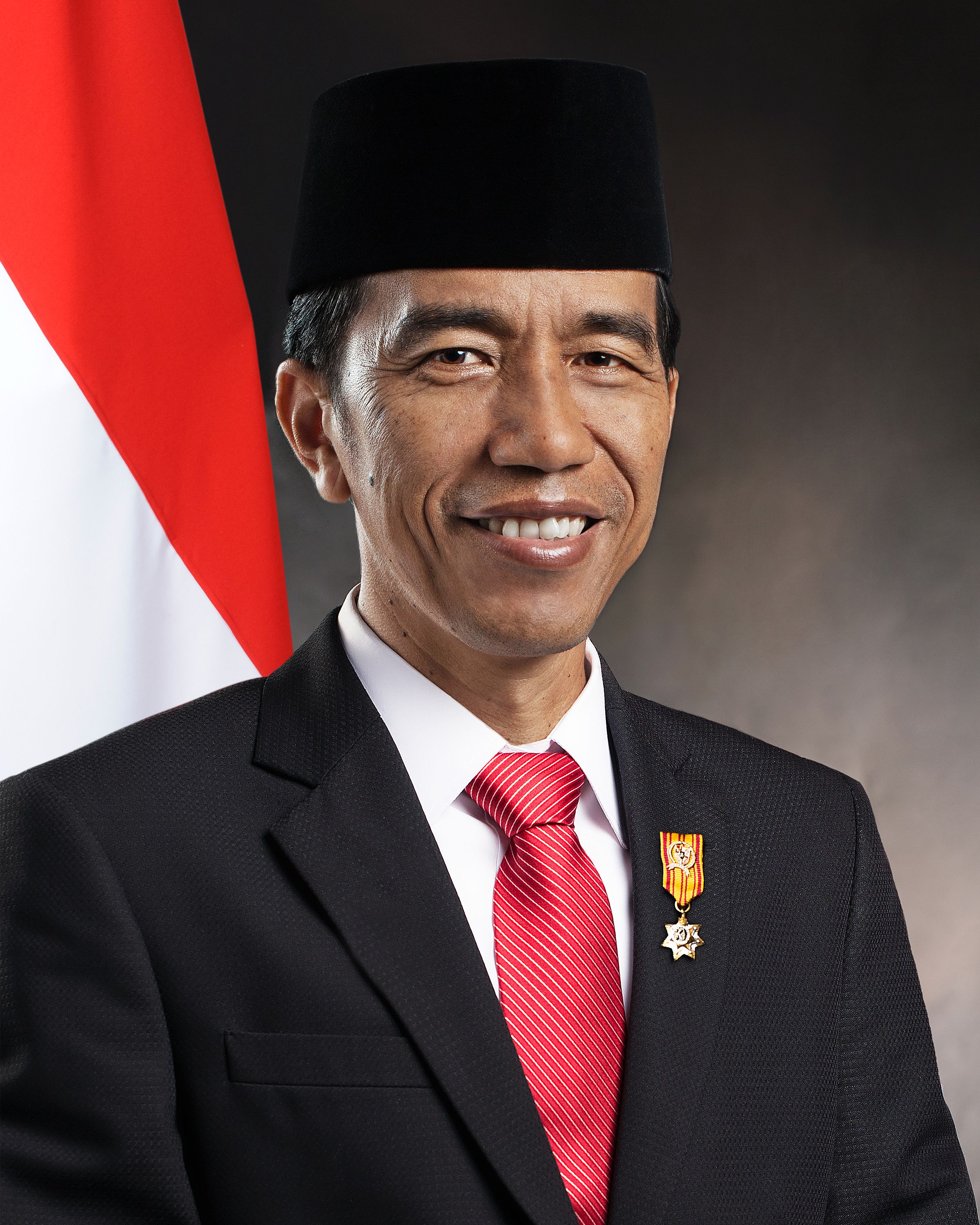
Two versions of Joko Widodo's official presidential portrait during his first term; released in 2014 (left) and 2016 (right)

=== Cabinets ===
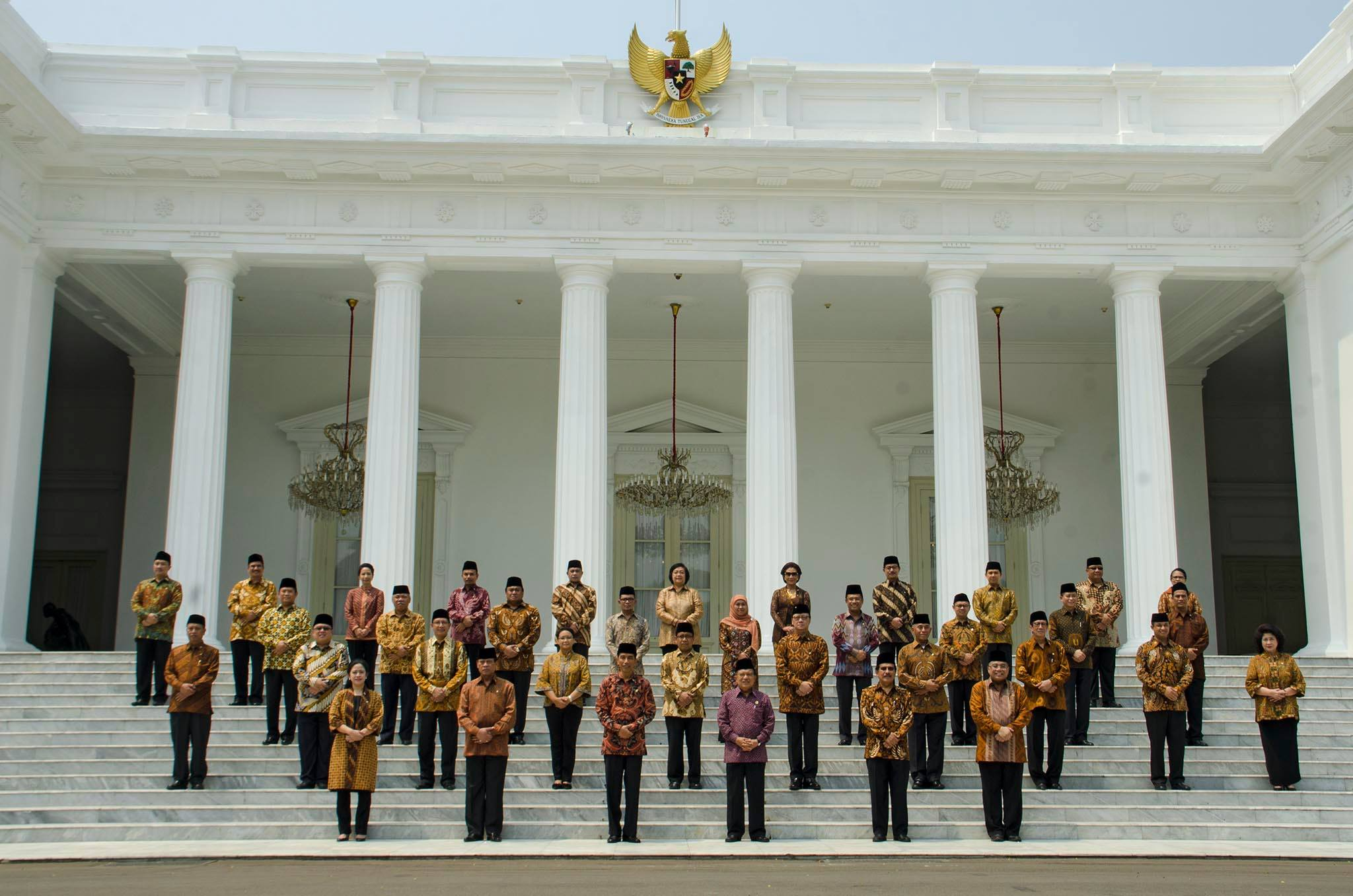
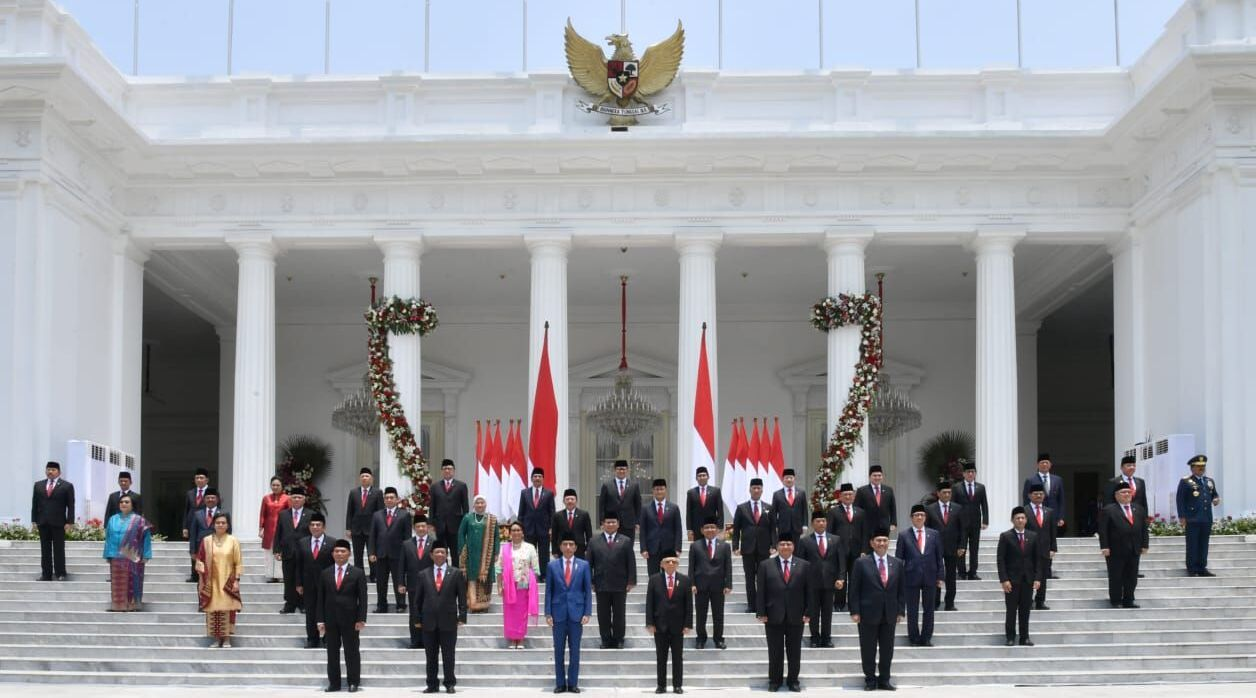
Joko Widodo's initial cabinet lines-up in 2014 (top) and 2019 (bottom)

Despite vowing during the 2014 campaign not to distribute government posts simply to political allies, Jokowi's first cabinet included many members of political parties. During the first year of his administration, he led a minority government until Golkar, the second-largest party in the People's Representative Council (DPR), switched from the opposition to the governing coalition. Jokowi denied accusations that he had interfered in Golkar's internal affairs, although he acknowledged that Luhut might have influenced the shift. His minister of industry, Airlangga Hartarto, was elected chairman of Golkar in 2018. The National Mandate Party (PAN) had also moved into the government camp earlier, but returned to the opposition in 2018.

Jokowi announced the 34 members of his first cabinet on 26 October 2014. It was praised for the inclusion of women, with Retno Marsudi becoming Indonesia's first female foreign minister, but also drew criticism for several appointments seen as politically motivated, including that of Puan Maharani, daughter of Megawati Sukarnoputri. His administration also created two new ministries—the Ministry of Public Works and Housing and the Ministry of Environment and Forestry—through mergers of existing ministries, while renaming and reorganising others. Jokowi carried out three cabinet reshuffles by 2018, removing ministers such as Rizal Ramli and Bambang Brodjonegoro while bringing in figures including Luhut and former World Bank managing director Sri Mulyani Indrawati. A further reshuffle followed in December 2020, replacing six ministers, including two who had been apprehended by the KPK.

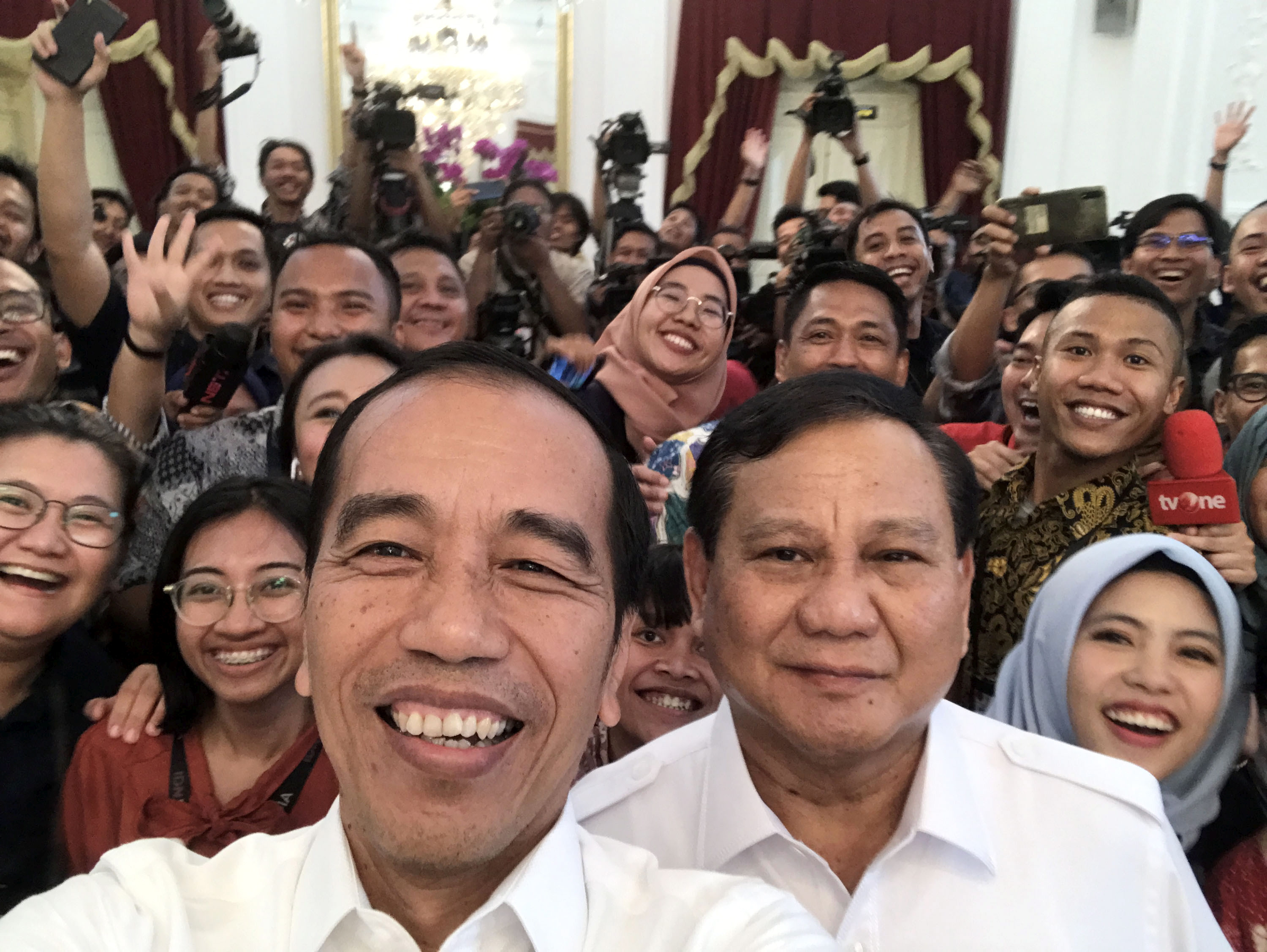
Joko Widodo and Prabowo Subianto in October 2019

Jokowi was criticised by PDI-P over what it saw as weaknesses in his policies, and PDI-P legislator Effendi Simbolon called for his impeachment. On 9 April 2015, during a PDI-P congress, party leader Megawati Sukarnoputri referred to Jokowi as a party functionary. She noted that presidential candidates are nominated by political parties, implying that Jokowi owed his position to the party and should follow its policy line. Several months earlier, Megawati and Jokowi had disagreed over the appointment of a new police chief, with Megawati backing Budi Gunawan, her former adjutant, while Jokowi preferred Badrodin Haiti.

After his re-election, Jokowi announced his second cabinet on 23 October 2019. He retained several ministers, including Sri Mulyani and Luhut, while also appointing Gojek founder Nadiem Makarim and his two-time presidential rival Prabowo Subianto as education and defence ministers, respectively.

In the first year of his second term, Jokowi's approval rating fell to 45.2 per cent, while his disapproval rating rose to 52 per cent. His deputy, Ma'ruf Amin, had a 67 per cent disapproval rating. The decline was attributed to unpopular policies. By early 2023, however, Jokowi's approval rating had reached an all-time high of 76.2 per cent after the easing of COVID-19 restrictions.

=== Politics ===
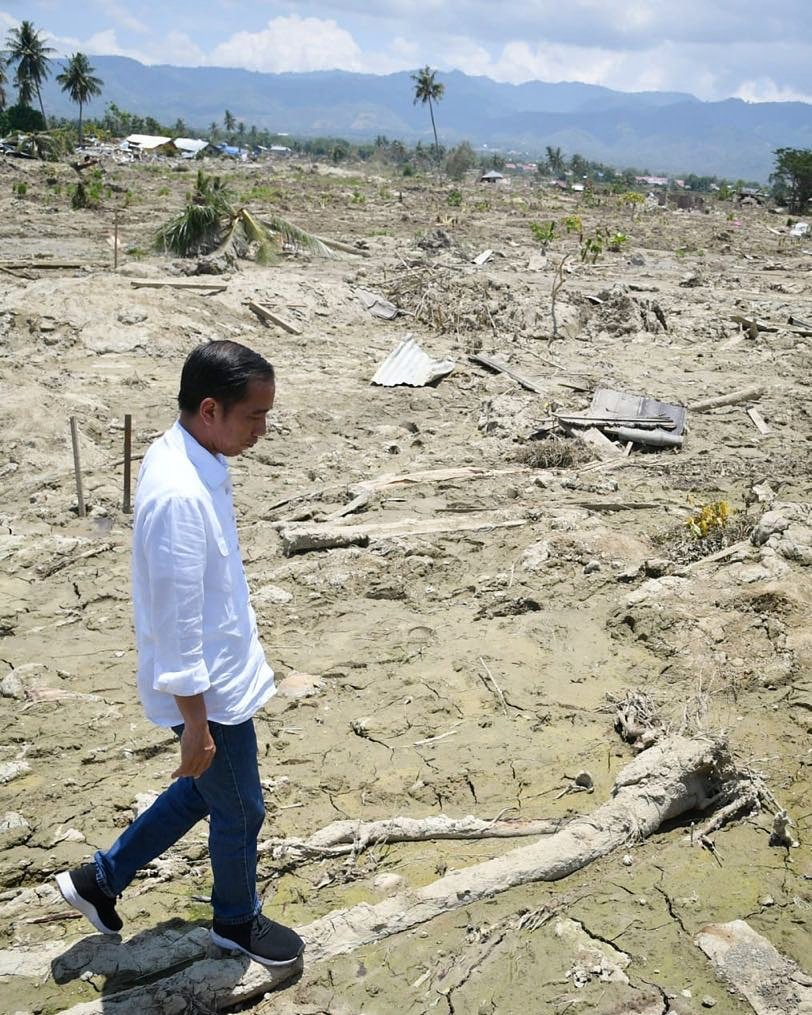
Jokowi visiting the destroyed village of Petobo after the 2018 Sulawesi earthquake and tsunami

Early in his first term, the opposition coalition in the DPR attempted to revoke a regulation (Perppu, Government Regulation in Lieu of Acts) issued by Jokowi's predecessor that had guaranteed direct regional elections in Indonesia, overriding an earlier law that provided for indirect elections. Jokowi supported direct regional elections and opposed efforts to revoke the regulation, stating that "direct regional elections was, in principle, non-negotiable". Within the first three years of his administration, he issued four such Perppu. Jokowi's government, which included parties that had opposed him in presidential elections, has been described as a big tent government and, by former Singaporean foreign minister George Yeo, as "democracy with Javanese characteristics".

After his re-election in 2019, a number of prominent politicians began floating the idea of amending the constitution to allow Jokowi to seek a third term in 2024. Cabinet figures who voiced support for extending term limits included coordinating ministers Airlangga Hartarto and Luhut Binsar Pandjaitan. The proposal gained greater prominence after the COVID-19 pandemic, amid claims that government programmes in his second term had been disrupted. By April 2022, however, Jokowi had explicitly stated that he would not seek a third term and ordered his cabinet to stop publicly discussing either a term-limit extension or an election delay.

Although he was not running for a third term, Jokowi told media outlets that he would not be a neutral actor and that he would "meddle" in the 2024 presidential election. He also met political party leaders in his capacity as president. In September 2023, during a public rally, he said that he possessed intelligence information gathered by government agencies, including BIN and BAIS, on the internal workings of political parties. In October 2023, Constitutional Court chief justice Anwar Usman, Jokowi's brother-in-law, issued a ruling that created a loophole in the minimum age requirement for presidential and vice-presidential candidates, allowing Jokowi's son Gibran Rakabuming Raka to run as Prabowo's running mate in 2024. Usman was later reprimanded by a judicial panel over the ruling and removed as chief justice. On 12 February 2024, investigative journalist Dandhy Laksono released Dirty Vote, a documentary on YouTube alleging that Jokowi had used state funds to support Prabowo's campaign. Prabowo went on to win the election by a wide margin, which a number of analysts attributed to Jokowi's backing. Jokowi was later also accused of interfering in the 2024 Indonesian local elections because of controversies over candidate-age requirements, notably affecting his son Kaesang Pangarep, and over political support, notably affecting Anies Baswedan, a prominent critic of his administration.

Near the end of his second term, however, Jokowi's relationship with PDI-P deteriorated because he backed Prabowo in the 2024 presidential campaign rather than his own party's candidate, Ganjar Pranowo; Jokowi's eldest son, Gibran Rakabuming Raka, also ran as Prabowo's vice-presidential candidate. On 22 April 2024, after the Constitutional Court rejected all claims and disputes relating to the 2024 presidential election, the PDI-P Honorary Council declared that Jokowi and Gibran were no longer members of the party, confirming their break with PDI-P. Even so, they were allowed to retain their membership cards as a gesture of respect for Jokowi as the sitting president and Gibran as the incoming vice president, although the cards no longer carried any rights within the party. The expulsion was declared complete on 4 December 2024.

=== Law and human rights ===
Judicial executions in Indonesia are carried out under a presidential decree following a death sentence imposed by a trial court. Jokowi in 2015 said he would not grant clemency for drug offenders sentenced to death, arguing Indonesia was in a state of emergency over drug-related crimes, citing statistics the Jakarta Globe reported to be faulty. His stance drew criticism as it could harm relations with the native countries of the condemned convicts, and also imperil Indonesians facing the death penalty abroad. Australia, Brazil and the Netherlands recalled their ambassadors from Indonesia following multiple executions in 2015. Australia reduced its foreign aid to Indonesia by nearly half, and Amnesty International issued a condemnation saying they showed a "complete disregard for due process and human rights safeguards". Former Indonesian Constitutional Court chief justice Jimly Asshiddiqie, who was a key player in the anti-death penalty lobby in Jakarta, said the push for the execution of Australians Myuran Sukumaran and Andrew Chan had come from Jokowi personally. The Sydney Morning Herald reported that Jokowi did not have or read related documents when he refused their clemency requests. In the same year, Jokowi granted Frenchman Serge Atlaoui and Filipino Mary Jane Veloso temporary reprieves due to pending legal appeals. As of 2017, around 260 people remain on death row in Indonesia.

Regarding terrorism, Jokowi's administration in early 2016 proposed replacing the 2003 anti-terrorism law. Following the 2018 Surabaya bombings, the worst terrorist attack on Indonesian soil since the 2002 Bali bombings, the controversial bill passed, allowing the Indonesian National Armed Forces to participate in counter-terrorism activities upon police request and presidential approval. It also allowed extended detention of terror suspects and permitted wiretapping without initial court approval. Jokowi had threatened to issue a presidential regulation in lieu of law (Perppu) if the bill did not pass the parliament by June that year.

During Jokowi's administration, there have been numerous instances where people were arrested or reported to police for activities deemed insulting to the president. Rights activists deem such arrests as a violation of the Constitution's guarantee of freedom of speech. A group claiming to be Jokowi's supporters reported Tempo magazine to police over a caricature of Jokowi as Pinocchio, after which the Presidential Palace issued a statement saying "the President respected freedom of press and speech". A book about Jokowi titled Jokowi Undercover was banned upon release and its author sentenced to three years in prison and buyers of the book being advised to surrender their copies to the authorities. Tempo magazine described the 436-page book as "trashy and tasteless, a compilation of hoax reports on President Joko Widodo, scattered across the internet and cyber chatrooms". The government's plans to resurrect a Dutch colonial law that would permit imprisonment for insulting the president resulted in widespread protests. A Law Firm and Public Interest Law Office (AMAR) institution later reported following the protests that they received many complaints of students regarding threats and sanctions of expulsion or suspension from their schools and universities. In addition, a remission granted to a journalist's murderer was revoked following media criticism.

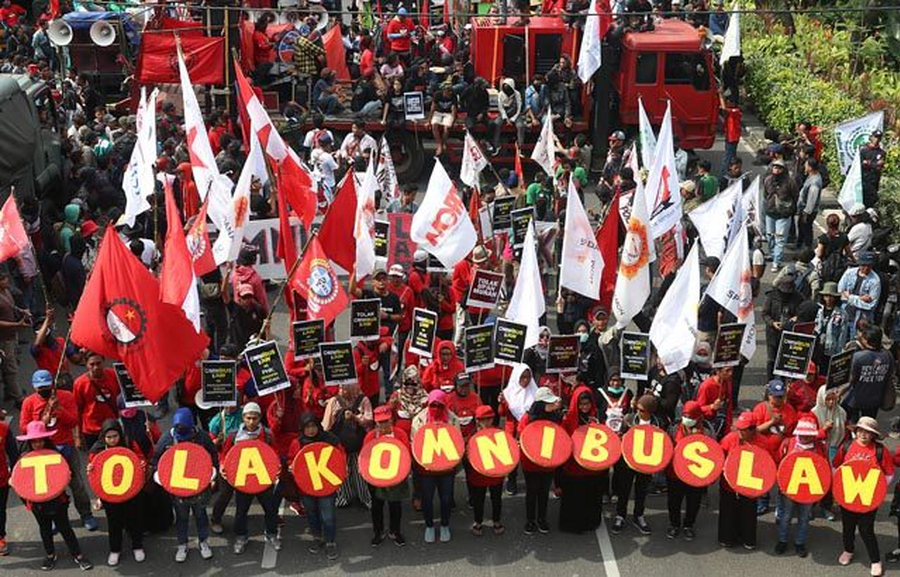
Since 2019, a series of mass protests and civil unrests were held across the country against some controversial policies.

In response to major protests, Jokowi's administration has generated some controversies. On 22 May 2019, amid post-election riots by supporters of losing presidential candidate Prabowo Subianto, the government limited the speed at which photos and videos could be shared on social media to stop people from being incited by fake news and calls for violence. In the aftermath, Amnesty International's Indonesian office denounced repressive measures against the demonstrators, condemned them as a grave human rights abuse and demanded the government investigate the extrajudicial executions in the clashes. In August and September 2019, the government blocked internet access in Papua and West Papua provinces amid violent protests against racism. Jakarta State Administrative Court in 2020 ruled the internet blocks in Papua illegal.

In 2017, Jokowi supported a controversial bill on mass organisations, which upon passing resulted in the disbandment of the Indonesian branch of Hizb ut-Tahrir. He argued the law was necessary to defend the national ideology, Pancasila. The 2020 banning of the Islamic Defenders Front (FPI) was also based on that law. Twenty-three days' earlier, police had shot dead six FPI members during a confrontation. The president's subsequent defence of the police during their duty and his statement that no citizens should break the law or harm the country was criticised by FPI secretary-general Munarman as a justification of human rights abuse and structural violence. A police chief involved in the car chase and subsequent murder claimed that the members were armed. After the passing of several controversial bills and repressive crackdowns from security officers on major protests since 2019, his presidency has been criticised for "neo-authoritarianism". The South China Morning Post even named him 'Little Suharto.'

A premium price hike of public health care BPJS Kesehatan through Executive Order (Perpres) 64/2020 was criticised as a flagrant breach of permanent Supreme Court (Mahkamah Agung) decision that nullified the Perpres 82/2018 about the price hike. The Perpres 64/2020 itself was signed amid the COVID-19 pandemic that had caused hardship among the population. His former deputy mayor of Surakarta, F. X. Hadi Rudyatmo, also voiced similar concerns.

Jokowi's presidency coincided with the 50th anniversary of the Indonesian mass killings of 1965–66 in 2015. A government-supported symposium to resolve human rights violations surrounding the event was held in 2016, but Jokowi said his government would not apologise to the victims of the mass purge. On LGBT rights, Jokowi stated that "there should be no discrimination against anyone", but added that "in terms of our beliefs, [the LGBT lifestyle] isn't allowed, Islam does not allow it." Under his presidency, the controversial transmigration program was cut once more, when in 2015, it was decided to end the migration program to the Papuan provinces.

Following the July 2022 murder of Nofriansyah Yosua Hutabarat, an Indonesian police officer, there were allegations of police involvement in a cover-up. Police chief General Listyo Sigit Prabowo took over the investigation, forming a special team including members of the Human Rights Commission and Police Commissions. Jokowi was keen for the force to be open about what happens: "Open it as it is. No cover-up. Transparent. That's it. This is important so that the people don't have doubts over the incident that occurred. This is what has to be maintained. Public trust in the police must be maintained." In August 2022, Hutabarat's former superior, Inspector General Ferdy Sambo, head of internal affairs of the Indonesian National Police, along with three others, was charged with Hutabarat's murder.

On 27 December 2023, hundreds of students from various universities in Aceh, such as Abulyatama University, Bina Bangsa Getsempena University, and University of Muhammadiyah Aceh, stormed a shelter for Rohingya refugees and forced them out of a convention centre in the city of Banda Aceh, demanding them to be deported. The students were also seen kicking the belongings of the Rohingya men, women, and children who were seated on the floor and crying in fear. They burned tires and chanted "Kick them out" and "Reject Rohingya in Aceh." Widodo later responded by inviting society to maintain tolerance and peace and to unite in maintaining a sense of unity, cooperation, and humanity, as well as being alert to world crises, such as food and economic crises, disputes between nations, and war.

On 31 January 2024, a group of faculty members at Gadjah Mada University, which Widodo attended, issued the Bulaksumur petition, criticizing his presidency and calling on him to uphold democracy and social justice.

=== Economy ===
Before taking office, Widodo sought to have outgoing president Susilo Bambang Yudhoyono (SBY) take responsibility for a further increase in fuel prices through further cuts to subsidies. Previous attempts by SBY to do so had led to civil unrest. On 1 January 2015, Jokowi introduced measures that appeared to reduce fuel subsidies. The policy prompted demonstrations, which Jokowi said were necessary to redirect spending toward infrastructure, education and health. From March 2015, however, the government set the price of Premium-branded petrol below market rates, effectively shifting the subsidy burden to the state-owned oil company Pertamina rather than the central government budget. The government also introduced a single-price policy aimed at selling fuel through official channels at the same price across the country, including in remote parts of Kalimantan and Papua. It said this target had been achieved by 2017.

In the first quarter of 2015, year-on-year GDP growth was 4.92 per cent, and in the second quarter it fell to 4.6 per cent, the lowest figure since 2009. Growth later remained above 5 per cent, though still below levels some observers regarded as desirable for the economy. The Indonesian rupiah (IDR) also weakened during Jokowi's administration: its exchange rate against the U.S. dollar briefly passed IDR 15,000 in 2018, its lowest level since the 1997 Asian financial crisis, and fell further to 16,700 in 2020. Year-on-year inflation in June 2015 was 7.26 per cent, higher than in May (7.15 per cent) and in June the previous year (6.7 per cent).

In 2016, the administration signed a tax amnesty law after a lengthy public debate and pushback, allowing wealthy Indonesians to declare previously unreported assets before the government tightened rules and oversight over imports and exports. It became the most successful programme of its kind in history, with more than IDR 4,865 trillion (approximately US$366 billion) in previously undeclared assets reported to the tax office.

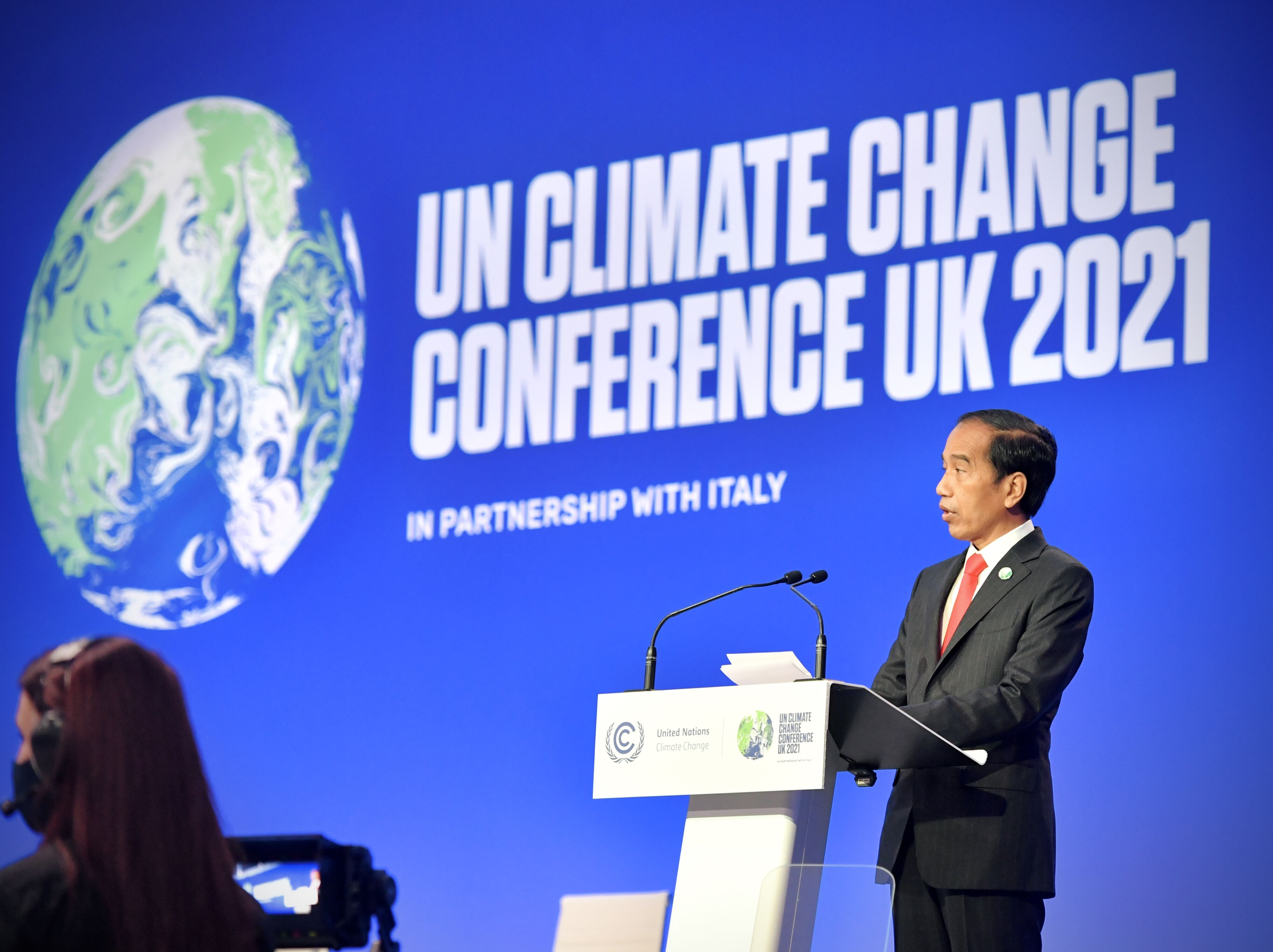
Widodo speaking at the opening ceremony of the COP26 climate summit in Glasgow, Scotland on 1 November 2021

Infrastructure development was a major feature of the Jokowi administration, with an emphasis on roads, railways, seaports, airports and irrigation. In 2016, the state budget allocated Rp 290 trillion (US$22 billion) to infrastructure, the largest such allocation in Indonesian history at the time. In total, his administration planned 265 infrastructure projects beginning in 2016. In September 2015, Indonesia awarded a $5.5 billion high-speed rail project to China, disappointing Japan, which had also sought the contract. Indonesia's transport ministry later listed numerous shortcomings in the project's plans, casting doubt on its viability and highlighting the administration's difficulties in turning mega-projects into reality while seeking foreign investment. Other major projects included the completion of the 4,325-kilometre Trans Papua road and the Trans-Java Toll Road, the start of construction on the Trans-Sulawesi Railway, and the Trans-Sumatra Toll Road, a US$50 billion plan to develop the maritime sector, including 24 "strategic ports", and the expansion of airport capacity in remote areas. The port development and modernisation programme, known as the Sea Toll Road, was intended to reduce price disparities between the more developed western regions and the less populated eastern regions of the country.

The opposition criticised the scale of infrastructure spending, noting that Indonesia's national debt rose by 48 per cent between 2014 and March 2018 to US$181 billion. They also argued that much of the debt had been used for remuneration rather than infrastructure development. In April 2018, Jokowi also introduced a policy allowing foreign workers in Indonesia to work without an Indonesian-language requirement, arguing that this would increase investment. The measure faced significant opposition from labour unions, which argued that it would raise unemployment.

During the 2019 presidential election campaign, Jokowi introduced the Pre-Employment Card, a training-assistance programme intended to improve workforce skills through training, retraining and upskilling. It was introduced alongside the Smart Indonesia College Card and the Cheap Food Card.

Eligible recipients of the Pre-Employment Card received training funds of IDR 1,000,000, which could be used on partner digital platforms. More than 150 training institutions provided courses that could be purchased and followed online from anywhere.

During the COVID-19 pandemic, the government shifted the Pre-Employment Card into a semi-social assistance programme to help workers affected by layoffs and recent graduates entering the labour market. To expand its reach, the budget was doubled to IDR 20 trillion. When the programme was launched in April 2020, the government said it was intended to reduce the cost of training for workers and companies, lower the cost of accessing information about training, improve the skills and competitiveness of Indonesian workers, and supplement formal education. The programme, however, remained limited to online training.

In 2020, the DPR passed the Omnibus Law on Job Creation. Although it was intended to boost investment and reduce red tape, it was also widely seen as weakening labour and environmental protections, prompting a series of protests in major cities. Jokowi defended the law as necessary for job creation and urged protesters to challenge it through the Constitutional Court of Indonesia. The law, which revised more than 70 existing laws and contained around 1,200 clauses, had been proposed by Jokowi after his 2019 re-election. Several groups criticised the government's lack of transparency during its deliberation. In the same year, Indonesia recorded its lowest inflation rate on record and experienced its first recession since the 1997 Asian financial crisis.

In November 2021, Jokowi promised at the COP26 climate summit to end and reverse deforestation in Indonesia by 2030 as part of the summit's first major agreement. The European Commission later approved a measure to phase out palm oil-based biofuels by 2030. During a meeting with European Commission President Ursula von der Leyen, Jokowi expressed concern about the EU Regulation on Deforestation-free products (EUDR), which aims to prevent products linked to deforestation from entering the EU market.

The Jokowi administration continued its predecessor's policy of resource nationalism, increasing government shareholding in multinational companies such as Freeport McMoRan, TotalEnergies and Chevron. In 2018, in a move intended to reduce imports, oil companies operating in Indonesia were ordered to sell their crude oil to state-owned Pertamina. A ban was also imposed on exports of raw nickel ore to encourage the growth of domestic nickel-related industries such as smelters and battery factories. The policy was later extended, with export bans on unprocessed copper, tin, bauxite and gold ores expected to take effect in mid-2023. By 2023, Indonesian nickel exports had risen from US$3 billion annually to US$30 billion.

=== Foreign policy ===
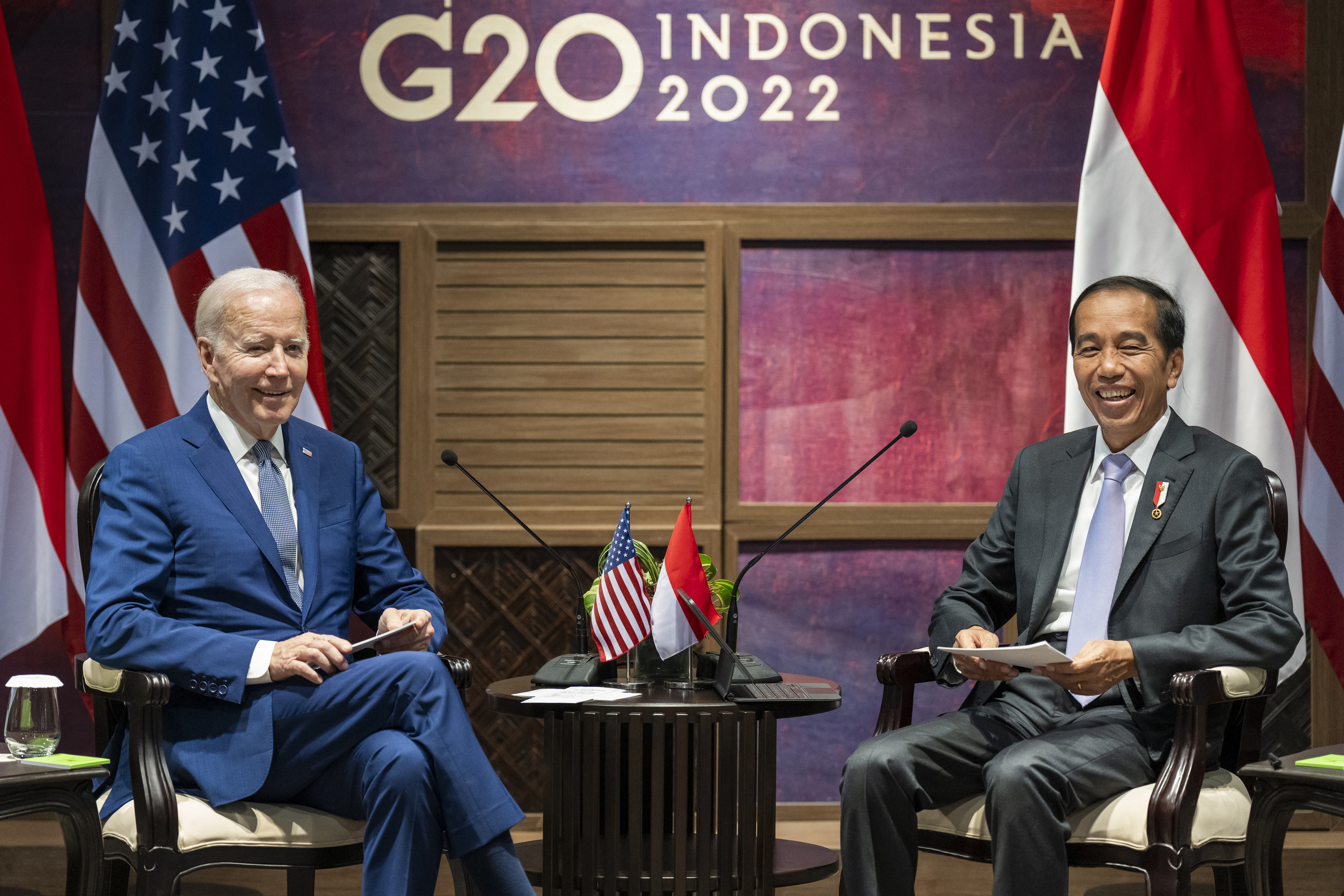
Joko Widodo and US President Joe Biden at the 2022 G20 Bali summit, 14 November 2022

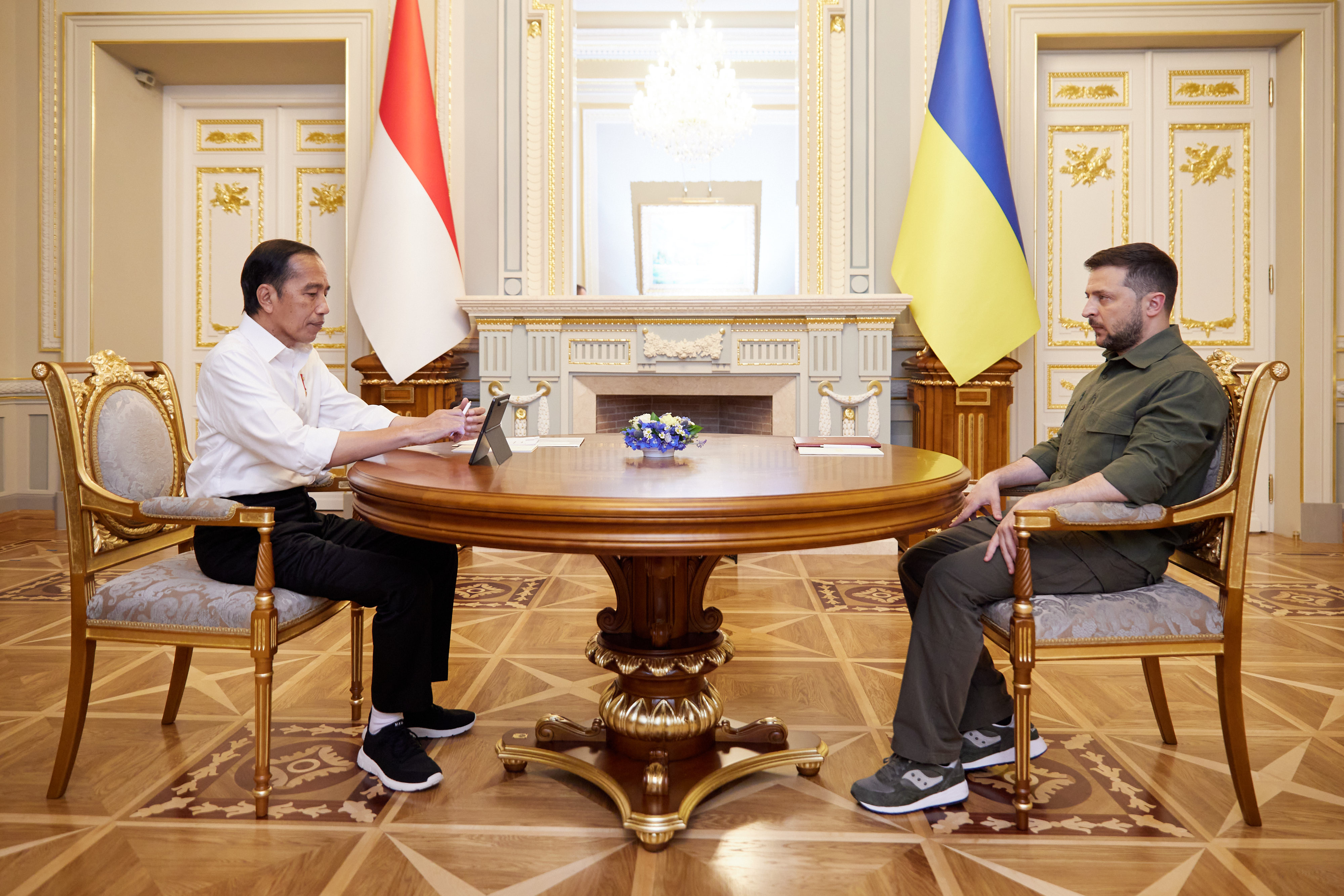
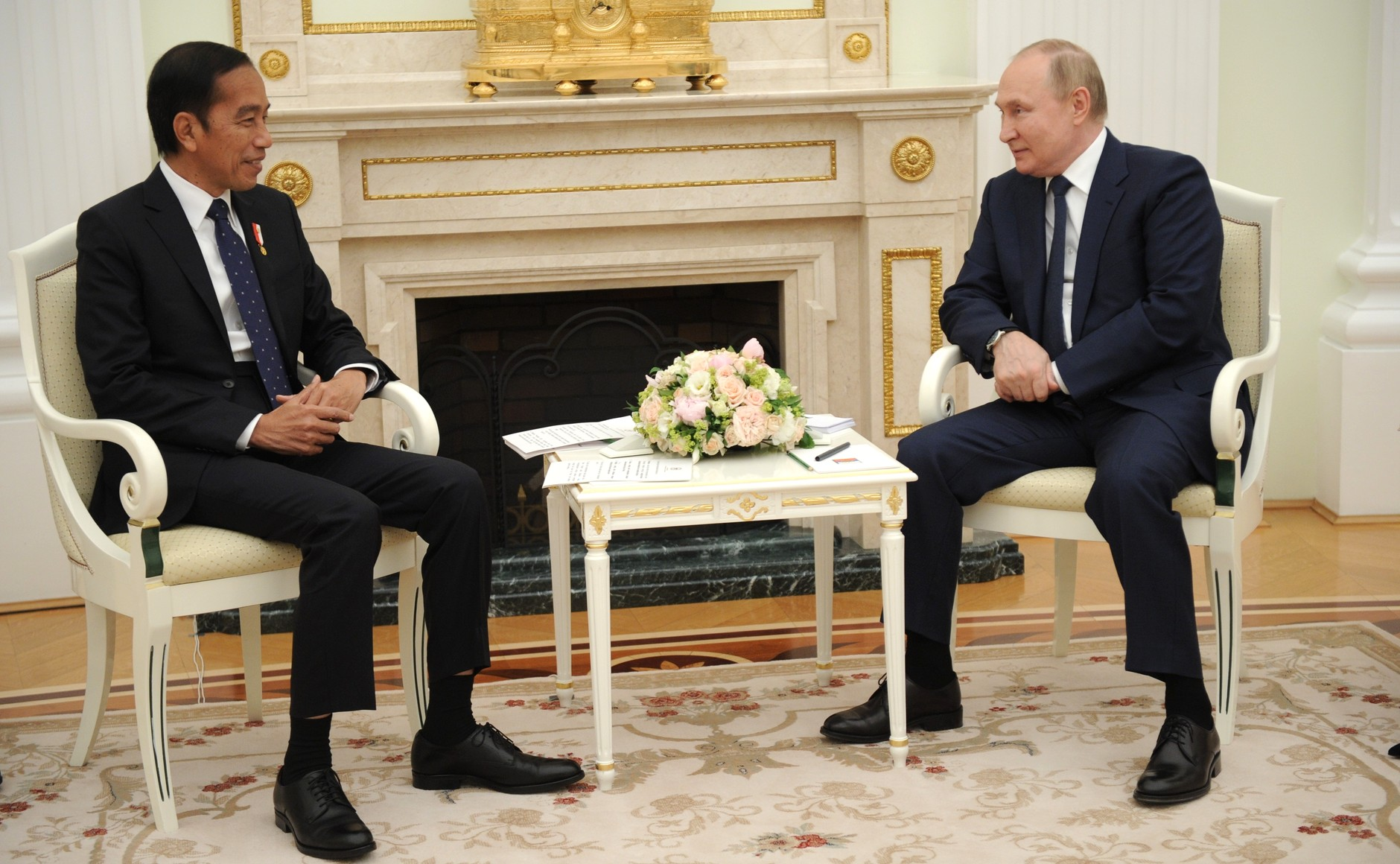
Joko Widodo meeting with Ukrainian President Volodymyr Zelenskyy in Kyiv on 29 June 2022 (top) and with Russian President Vladimir Putin in Moscow on 30 June 2022 (bottom)

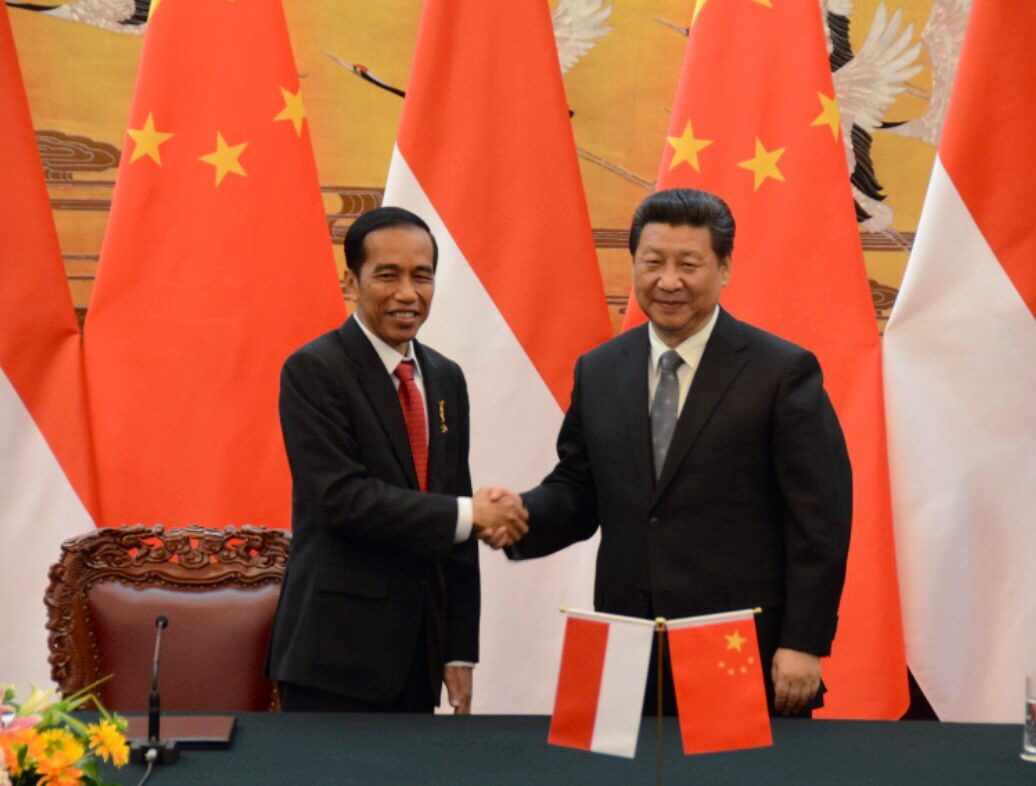
Indonesian President Joko Widodo meeting Chinese President Xi Jinping

Before Jokowi's election, Indonesia's foreign policy was shaped by his predecessor's dictum of "a thousand friends and zero enemies." Jokowi outlined a three-pronged foreign policy centred on maintaining Indonesia's sovereignty, improving protection for Indonesian citizens, and intensifying economic diplomacy. Indonesian foreign policy during his tenure has been described as "pragmatic and inward-looking", with a strong emphasis on economic development and investment. During his ten years in office, he did not attend a session of the United Nations General Assembly, although he addressed it virtually in 2020 and 2021.

Jokowi aspired to make Indonesia a global maritime power (poros maritim dunia, lit. 'global maritime axis'). He saw the sea as central to Indonesia's future and argued that, as a maritime nation, Indonesia should assert itself between the Indian Ocean and the Pacific Ocean. The doctrine's five pillars were the revival of Indonesia's maritime culture, the protection and management of marine resources, the development of maritime infrastructure, connectivity, shipping and tourism, greater international maritime cooperation and conflict resolution at sea, and the strengthening of maritime defence forces. As part of this vision, Jokowi adopted a tougher stance on illegal fishing. He said that Jakarta could no longer tolerate a situation in which more than 5,000 vessels were operating illegally in Indonesian waters each day, making a mockery of Indonesian sovereignty and causing annual losses of more than $20 billion.

On the territorial disputes in the South China Sea, particularly around the Natuna Islands, where China's nine-dash line overlaps with Indonesian EEZ claims, Jokowi stated that "there will be no compromise on sovereignty", and renamed Indonesia's section of the South China Sea the "North Natuna Sea". In June 2016, he held a cabinet meeting off the islands aboard the Indonesian Navy corvette KRI Imam Bonjol, calling for increased maritime patrols in the area. Under his administration, Indonesia also released an "Indo-Pacific Vision" for ASEAN countries, which treated the Indian and Pacific Oceans as a single interconnected geostrategic area and called for a regional architecture built on cooperation. Indonesia further entered a trilateral agreement with Malaysia and the Philippines allowing coordinated patrols in the pirate-infested Sulu Sea.

In the Muslim world, Jokowi called on leaders at the Organisation of Islamic Cooperation summit in Jakarta to unite in support of reconciliation and Palestinian independence. Under Jokowi, Indonesia's foreign minister visited Palestine but rejected calls to establish bilateral diplomatic relations with Israel. An honorary consul was established in Ramallah in the West Bank, though it had to be inaugurated in Amman, Jordan. Jokowi also condemned the persecution of Rohingya Muslims in Myanmar and oversaw the dispatch of four Indonesian Air Force transport planes carrying 34 tons of relief supplies for Rohingya refugees in Bangladesh. In October 2021, he advocated COVID-19 vaccine equity, urging richer countries to share vaccines with poorer ones.

In response to the Russian invasion of Ukraine, Jokowi visited both countries in July 2022, meeting Ukrainian President Volodymyr Zelenskyy and Russian President Vladimir Putin while emphasizing the need for peace and the restoration of global food supply chains. Although the visits did not contribute directly to a peace settlement, Jokowi was praised for the effort as a mediator. As Indonesia hosted the 2022 G20 Summit later that year, Jokowi also invited Zelenskyy to attend, while resisting calls to revoke Russia's invitation to the summit.

During a press conference at the White House on 14 November 2023, Jokowi called for a ceasefire in the Gaza war, "for the sake of humanity", and urged U.S. President Joe Biden to do more to end "atrocities" in the Gaza Strip. On 11 October 2024, two Indonesian TNI soldiers serving as UNIFIL peacekeepers were injured by IDF tank fire at the UNIFIL headquarters in Naqoura, in southern Lebanon. In response, Widodo called for caution amid the apparent escalation and widening of the Israel-Hamas War to Lebanon.

=== New capital ===
By April 2019, it had become public that Widodo had decided in a cabinet meeting to move the capital of Indonesia away from Jakarta to a location outside Java. On 25 August 2019, it was announced that the new capital would be located in Kalimantan, between the regencies of Penajam North Paser and Kutai Kartanegara. On 30 July 2024, Jokowi began working in the new capital, Nusantara.

== Post-presidency ==
Widodo's second term ended on 20 October 2024, and he was succeeded by Prabowo Subianto, with Jokowi's eldest son, Gibran Rakabuming Raka, becoming vice president. In the 2024 Indonesian local elections, he publicly endorsed 84 candidates for the position of governor, mayor and regent. Candidates backed by Jokowi performed strongly in the elections, notably in Central Java, where his preferred candidate, Ahmad Luthfi, defeated the PDI-P-backed candidate, Andika Perkasa, in one of the party's traditional strongholds, and in North Sumatra, where Jokowi's son-in-law Bobby Nasution defeated the incumbent governor.

In April 2025, Widodo joined the advisory board of Bloomberg New Economy. Other former senior officials on the board included the former Italian prime minister Mario Draghi and former United States secretary of commerce Gina Raimondo. He formally joined the Indonesian Solidarity Party (PSI) on 14 October 2025, though he only confirmed his membership in September 2026.

== Personal life ==
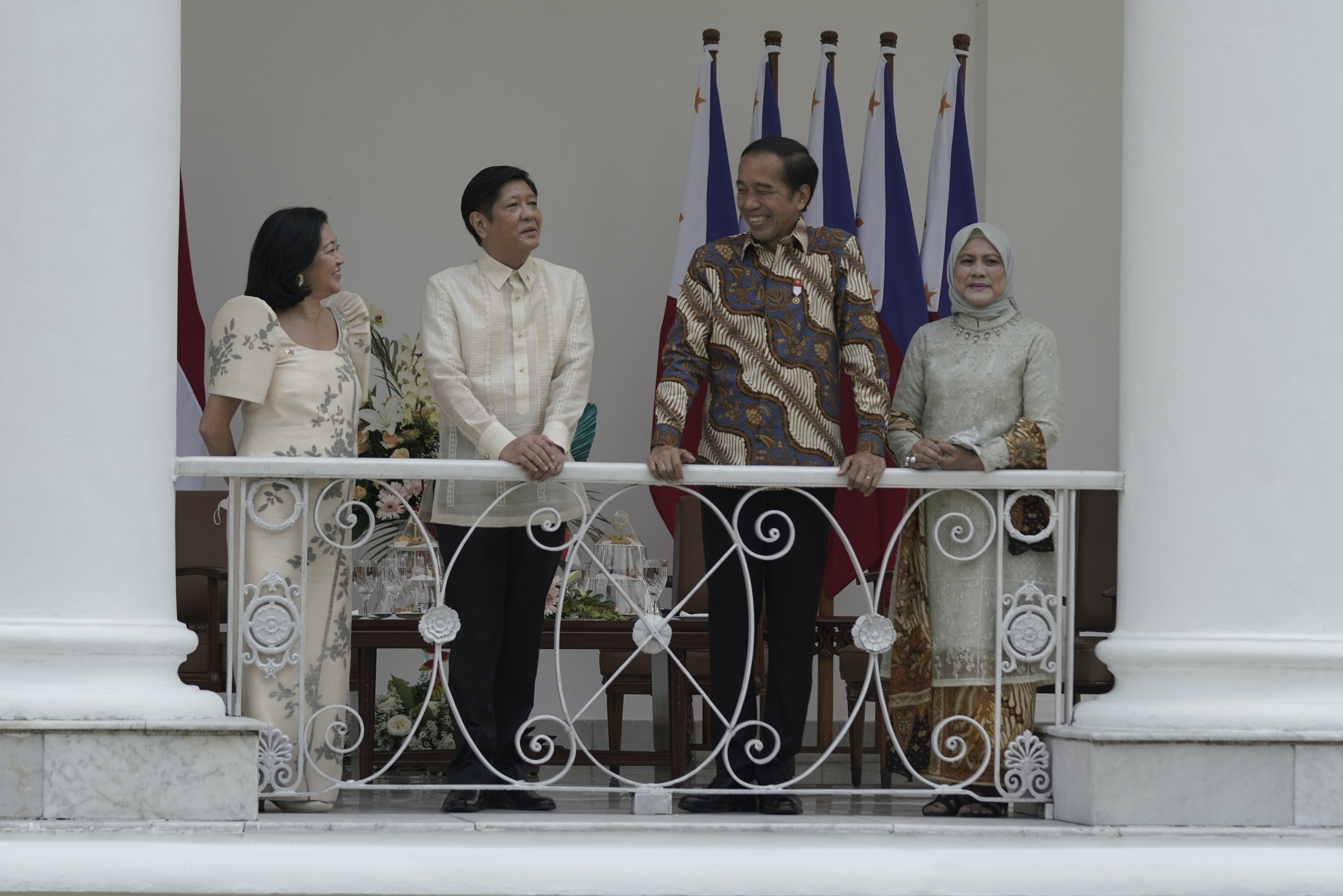
Joko Widodo and First Lady Iriana hosting Philippine president Bongbong Marcos at the Bogor Palace in Java on 5 September 2022

Widodo married his wife Iriana on 24 December 1986. The couple have two sons and one daughter. Their first son, Gibran Rakabuming Raka (born 1 October 1987), studied in Sydney and Singapore, including at the Management Development Institute of Singapore (MDIS), and served as mayor of Surakarta, Jokowi's hometown, from 2021 to 2024. Their only daughter, Kahiyang Ayu (born 20 April 1991), completed an undergraduate degree in food technology at Sebelas Maret University in Surakarta. Their second son, Kaesang Pangarep (born 25 December 1994), completed his secondary education at ACS International in Singapore, and is known mainly as an online vlogger. Jokowi has six grandchildren: a grandson and a granddaughter from Gibran (born in 2016 and 2019, respectively), and a granddaughter, two grandsons from Kahiyang (born in 2018, 2020 and 2022, respectively) and one granddaughter from Kaesang (born in 2024).

Several members of Widodo's family later entered politics, running in the 2020 local elections. Gibran declared his candidacy for the mayorship of Surakarta, as did Jokowi's son-in-law Bobby Nasution in Medan and his brother-in-law Wahyu Purwanto in Gunung Kidul Regency. Gibran and Bobby won their elections and both took office in 2021, while Wahyu withdrew his candidacy at Jokowi's request. Jokowi's younger sister Idayati married Anwar Usman, Chief Justice of the Constitutional Court of Indonesia, in May 2022. In September 2023, Kaesang entered politics by joining Indonesian Solidarity Party and was named its chairman a few days later. A month later, Gibran was announced as a vice-presidential candidate in the 2024 presidential election.

Jokowi has been described as "Muslim but broadly secular in his outlook." His 2019 statement that religion and politics should be separated prompted public debate over whether he was promoting secularism in Indonesia. In June 2013, a film titled Jokowi, depicting his childhood and youth, was released. He objected to the film, saying that he considered his life too simple to merit a screen adaptation.

According to The Economist, Jokowi "has a penchant for loud rock music" and once owned a bass guitar signed by Robert Trujillo of the heavy metal band Metallica, which was later confiscated by the KPK. In November 2017, Danish Prime Minister Lars Løkke Rasmussen, during an official visit to Jakarta, gave Jokowi a Metallica Master of Puppets vinyl box set as a diplomatic gift. It was signed by the band's drummer and co-founder, Lars Ulrich, who is Danish. In keeping with his transparency policy, Jokowi paid IDR 11 million ($800) from his personal funds to keep the record after it had been declared a state asset, thereby avoiding accusations of gratification. In support of Megadeth's 2018 tour in Indonesia, the band's lead vocalist Dave Mustaine invited Jokowi to attend the concert. Unable to attend, Jokowi instead opened the concert with a video greeting, saying, "I am a fan of Megadeth, I like their songs; Sweating Bullets, Ashes in Your Mouth, and Wake Up Dead. Enjoy watching everyone". He is also a fan of other metal bands, including Lamb of God, Carcass and Napalm Death. On 2 November 2013, while serving as governor of Jakarta, he was seen attending the rock festival Rock in Solo in casual dress.

Jokowi has often been noted for his resemblance to former U.S. president Barack Obama, and his outsider political profile has likewise invited comparisons with Obama.

Jokowi is a silat practitioner. He has practised the Setia Hati Terate style of Persaudaraan Setia Hati Terate since junior high school and later attained the first-degree pendekar warga rank on 16 November 2013.

== Controversies ==
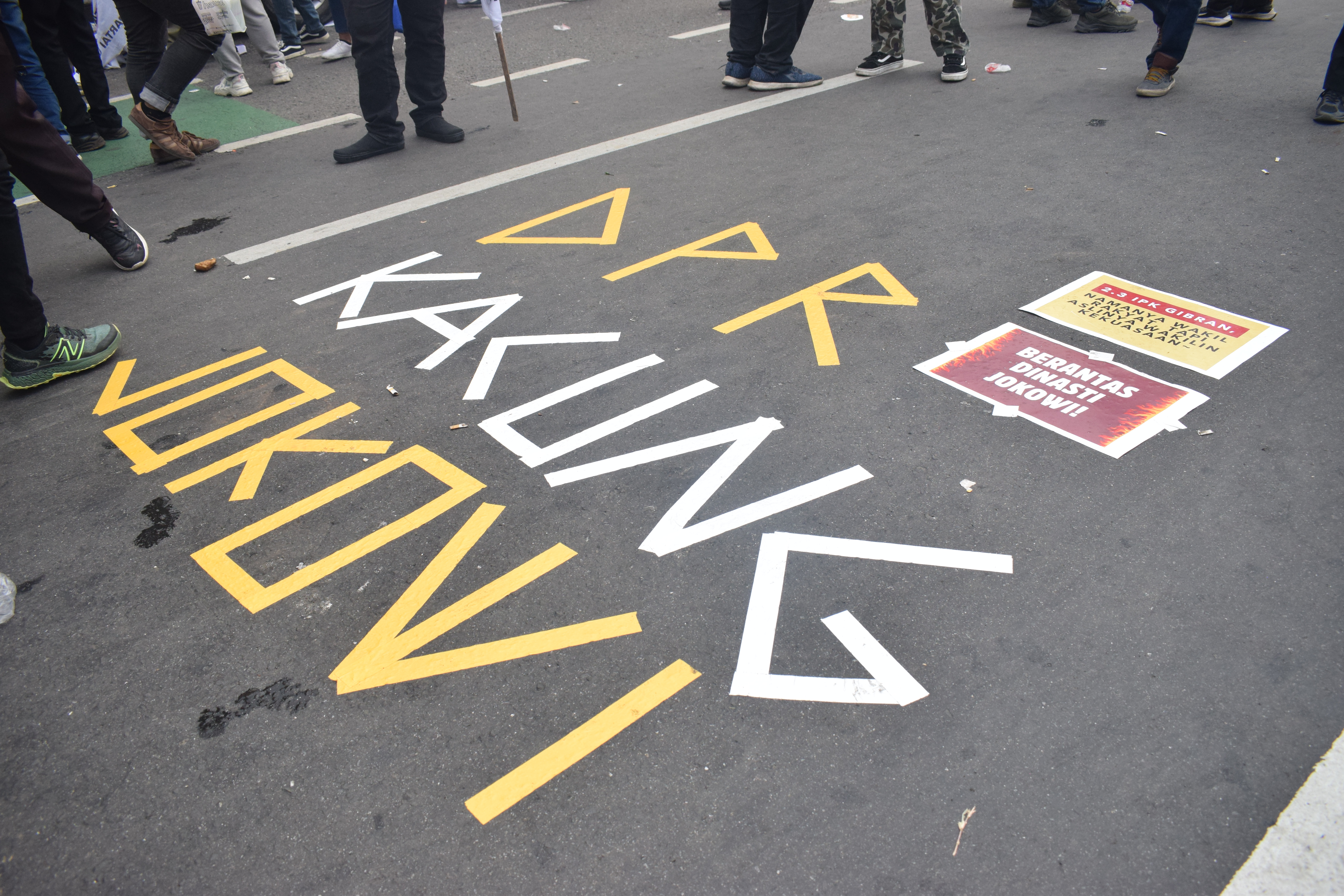
A tape art that reads "DPR kacung Jokowi" (lit. 'House of Representatives is Jokowi's lackey') and criticism of Jokowi's nepotism during 2024 Indonesian local election law protests.

=== Allegations of neo-authoritarianism ===
Jokowi was criticised for policies seen as weakening opposition parties, restricting freedom of speech, and enabling repressive conduct by law enforcement officials during demonstrations. Other policies, such as the Omnibus Law on Job Creation and the Electronic Information and Transaction Act (UU ITE), were also cited in support of these accusations. The charge was rejected by the PDI-P secretary-general Hasto Kristiyanto, who argued that the government was responding to unlawful acts such as damaging public facilities or spreading fake news, and that the actions of the security forces therefore should not be seen as authoritarian repression. Following the passage of several controversial bills and security crackdowns on major protests since 2019, his government was criticised as exhibiting "neo-authoritarianism", a characterization linked by critics to the New Order under Suharto. The South China Morning Post described him as "Little Suharto".

=== Controversial appointments ===
Jokowi was strongly criticised after appointing HM Prasetyo as attorney general, as Prasetyo was seen as lacking sufficient experience in the prosecutor's office and as being closely tied to a political party. He was also seen as inconsistent when he appointed Airlangga Hartarto, the general chairman of Golkar, as minister of industry after initially asking ministers not to hold concurrent positions as party administrators. Previously, Puan Maharani had also served for a time as chair of the PDI-P Central Committee while holding office as Coordinating Minister for Human Development and Cultural Affairs.

Jokowi again drew widespread controversy and protests when he proposed Commissioner General Budi Gunawan to the DPR in mid-January 2015 as the sole candidate for National Police Chief. Budi Gunawan was regarded by critics as having a poor record in the police and, as a former aide to Megawati Sukarnoputri, his nomination was seen by some as an act of political repayment. A day before the DPR confirmed him as a candidate, he was named a suspect by the Corruption Eradication Commission in an alleged fat bank account case. Jokowi then postponed his inauguration as National Police Chief until the legal process involving Budi Gunawan was completed, and appointed Deputy National Police Chief Commissioner General Badrodin Haiti to carry out the office's daily duties. Badrodin Haiti was officially appointed National Police Chief on 17 April 2015, and was later replaced by Tito Karnavian, while Budi Gunawan became head of BIN. Because of his decision not to proceed with Budi Gunawan's appointment as National Police Chief, Jokowi was jeered by PDI-P cadres.

=== Accusations of dynastic politics ===
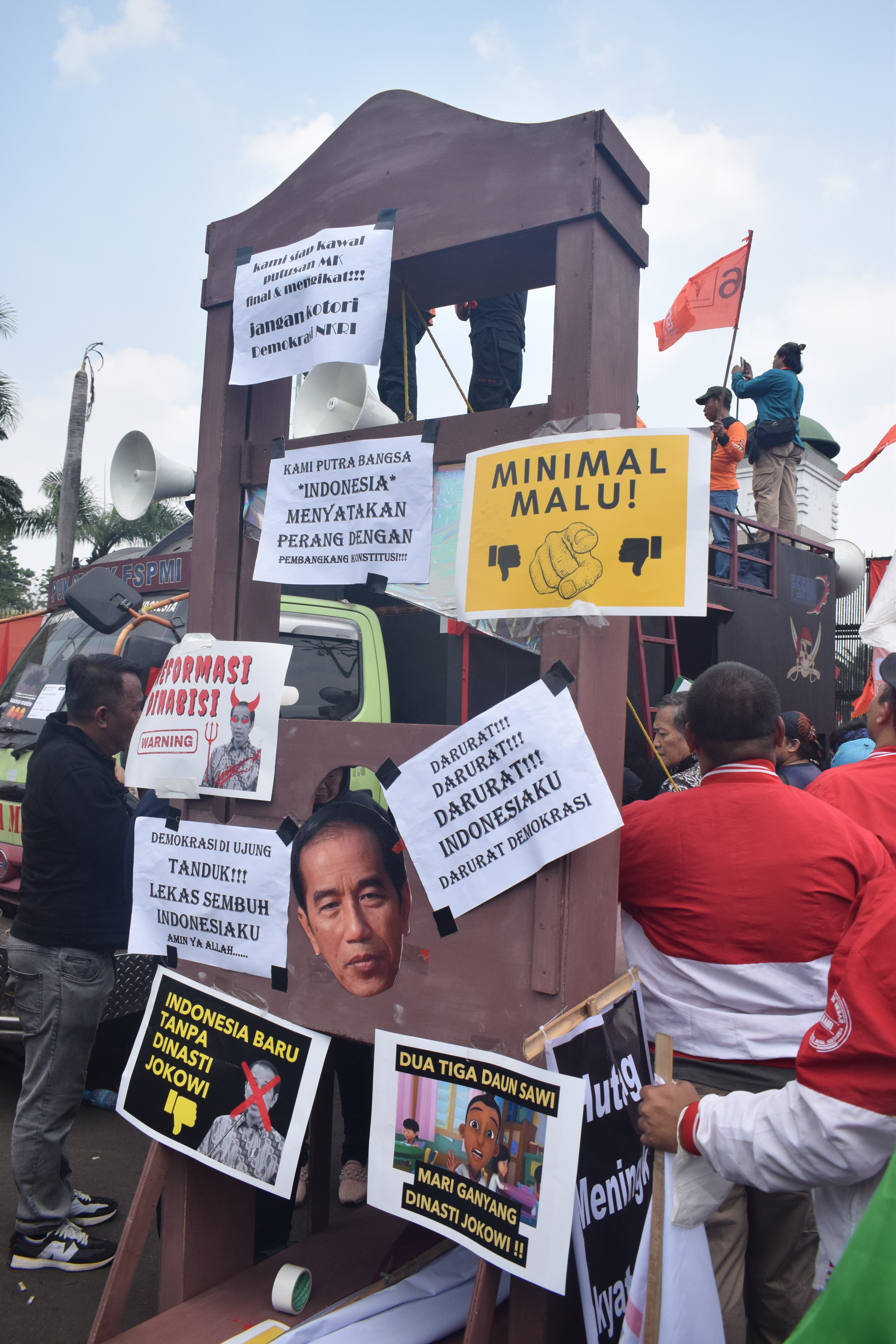
A miniature guillotine emblazoned with Jokowi's face and posters containing criticism and accusations of Jokowi's dynasty politics during the 2024 protests.

Jokowi faced accusations of dynastic politics and nepotism toward the end of his second term. These accusations arose after his eldest son, Gibran Rakabuming Raka, ran as the vice-presidential candidate alongside Prabowo Subianto in the 2024 presidential election, following a Constitutional Court decision issued when the court was chaired by Jokowi's brother-in-law, Anwar Usman. The issue drew further attention as other members of the Jokowi family also entered or were linked to electoral politics, including Bobby Nasution in the North Sumatra gubernatorial election, Kaesang Pangarep as a possible successor to Gibran as mayor of Surakarta, and Erina Gudono, Kaesang's wife, who was said to be considering a run in the 2024 Sleman regental election. Jokowi was also accused of nepotism and of undermining "people's sovereignty". Tempo magazine argued that Jokowi's dynastic politics were damaging democracy in Indonesia, and wrote that his interference in the 2024 Indonesian presidential election was an attempt to protect himself from possible legal consequences. The issue culminated in the 2024 Indonesian local election law protests after the House of Representatives attempted to draft a regional elections (Pilkada) bill that contradicted the Constitutional Court's ruling.

The Organized Crime and Corruption Reporting Project (OCCRP) included Jokowi among its finalists for the 2024 Person of the Year in Organized Crime and Corruption after he received one of the highest vote totals. OCCRP said that "civil society groups and experts say that Jokowi's government significantly weakened Indonesia's anti-corruption commission" and that "Jokowi was also widely criticised for undermining Indonesia’s electoral and judicial institutions to benefit the political ambitions of his son, who is now vice-president." OCCRP ultimately named the deposed Syrian president Bashar al-Assad as the winner.

=== Environmental issues ===
In 2019, during a presidential debate with Prabowo Subianto, Jokowi sought to win public support by highlighting Prabowo's alleged ownership of approximately 120,000 hectares of land in Aceh. In 2020, Joko Widodo enacted the Omnibus Law (Job Creation Law), which requires palm oil entrepreneurs to support smallholder plantations in the name of social justice for poor communities, while also creating opportunities to legalise previously illegal forest clearing.

During the floods in Aceh, North Sumatra, and West Sumatra at the end of 2025, Jokowi's volunteer team again targeted Prabowo Subianto over his land ownership in Aceh and accused Susilo Bambang Yudhoyono of issuing the largest number of forest-release permits, citing Greenpeace data.

However, there is no evidence that President Susilo Bambang Yudhoyono issued permits for forest clearing on degraded or critical lands before 2014, nor is there evidence that Jokowi granted permits on critical lands that caused the floods in Aceh, West Sumatra, and North Sumatra.

=== Rumors of interference ===
On 12 February 2024, investigative journalist Dandhy Laksono released Dirty Vote, a documentary he directed and uploaded to YouTube, alleging that Joko Widodo had used state funds to support Prabowo Subianto's campaign. The film went viral within a day and prompted accusations of sabotage from Prabowo's campaign team. The presidential office denied the claims, and protests were held in response to the allegations.

=== University diploma ===
Jokowi's university diploma has been the subject of authenticity allegations. The first public figure to claim that Joko Widodo's academic degree was fake was Bambang Tri Mulyono in his book Jokowi Undercover. In 2017, he was tried in court and sentenced to three years in prison for defaming Joko Widodo.

Rismon Hasiholan Sianipar, an alumnus of the Faculty of Technology of Gadjah Mada University (UGM) who believes Jokowi's diploma is fake, wrote a forensic analysis of the degree. His work was supported by telematics expert and former Minister of Youth and Sports Roy Suryo. Suryo cited an earlier post of his from 25 February 2020, which included a page from a 1985 graduation book. He said the book showed a photograph of the late Hari Mulyono under the name "Jokowi". Suryo also questioned the authenticity of Jokowi's diploma and highlighted the typefaces used in the document, arguing that printing technology in 1985 would not have allowed the fonts seen in Jokowi's diploma and thesis documents.

According to allegations advanced by Rismon Sianipar, Roy Suryo, and Tifauzia Tyassuma, Jokowi attended UGM but did not graduate because his grade point average was below two, while his brother-in-law Hari Mulyono did graduate. They further alleged that Joko Widodo borrowed and used Hari Mulyono's diploma for employment purposes and later used a diploma bearing Hari Mulyono's serial number, together with a photograph they described as a composite of Dumatno and Jokowi, as part of the requirements for his candidacy for Mayor of Surakarta. In 2017, Hari Mulyono reportedly died under unexplained circumstances. The police rejected these allegations and instead named Rismon Sianipar, Roy Suryo, and Dr. Tifauzia Tyassuma as suspects in cases of defamation and slander.

On 15 and 16 April 2025, protests over the authenticity of his university diploma took place at the UGM campus and at his residence in Surakarta.

On 22 May 2025, after comparing Jokowi's university diploma with other diplomas and UGM's university records, the Criminal Investigation Agency declared the diploma authentic.

== In popular culture ==
Jokowi Adalah Kita is an Indonesian drama film based on Jokowi's life. The film stars Ben Joshua, Sylvia Fully, and Agustin Taidy, and was released on 20 November 2014. Its broadcast, however, was delayed amid protests over the government's decision to raise fuel prices.

One of his best-known quotes is "Yo ndak tau. Kok tanya saya?" (in Indonesian, usually shortened to YNTKTS), which literally means "I don't know. Why are you asking me?" He first used it while serving as Governor of Jakarta in response to questions from journalists, and it became closely associated with his public manner. The phrase became widely popular across social media in the 2020s. In Indonesian internet slang, it is often used jokingly or satirically in response to a problem. A variation of the phrase was coined by his youngest son, Kaesang Pangarep, when journalist Najwa Shihab asked about Jokowi's hobby of raising tadpoles on her talk show. He replied, "Ya tanya bapak. Jangan tanya saya." (usually shortened to YTBJTS), meaning "Yeah. Ask my dad. Don't ask me."

== Electoral history ==
Electoral history of Joko Widodo
Year	Office	Party	Votes received				Result
Year	Office	Party	Total	%	P.	Swing	Result
2005	Mayor of Surakarta	PDI-P	99,747	36.62%	1st	—N/a	Won
2010	Mayor of Surakarta	PDI-P	248,243	90.09%	1st	+53.47	Won
2012	Governor of Jakarta	PDI-P	2,472,130	53.82%	1st	—N/a	Won
2014	President of Indonesia	PDI-P	70,997,833	53.15%	1st	—N/a	Won
2019	President of Indonesia	PDI-P	85,607,362	55.50%	1st	+2.35	Won

== Awards ==
=== National honours ===
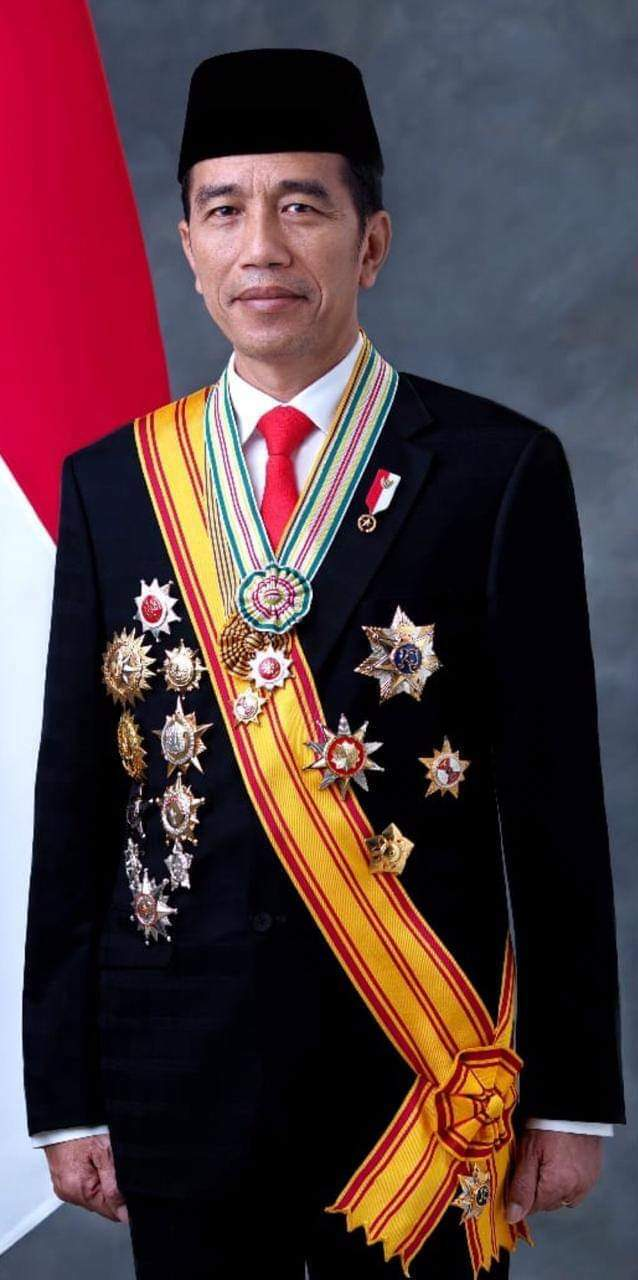
Joko Widodo's second term official portrait with presidential decorations

- Star of the Republic of Indonesia, 1st Class – 2014
- Star of Mahaputera, 1st Class – 2014
- Star of Merit, 1st Class – 2011
- Star of Humanity – 2014
- Star of Democracy Upholder, 1st Class – 2014
- Star of Budaya Parama Dharma – 2014
- Star of Bhayangkara, 1st Class – 2014
- Guerilla Star – 2014
- Sacred Star – 2014
- Star of Dharma – 2014
- Star of Yudha Dharma, 1st Class – 2014
- Star of Kartika Eka Paksi, 1st Class – 2014
- Star of Jalasena, 1st Class – 2014
- Star of Swa Bhuwana Paksa, 1st Class – 2014

=== Foreign honours ===
Coat of arms as member of the Order of the Seraphim

Afghanistan

- Medal of Ghazi Amanullah – 29 January 2018

Brunei

- The Most Esteemed Family Order of Brunei (DK) – 7 February 2015
- Sultan of Brunei Golden Jubilee Medal – 6 October 2017

East Timor

- Grand Collar of the Order of Timor-Leste – 26 January 2016

Saudi Arabia

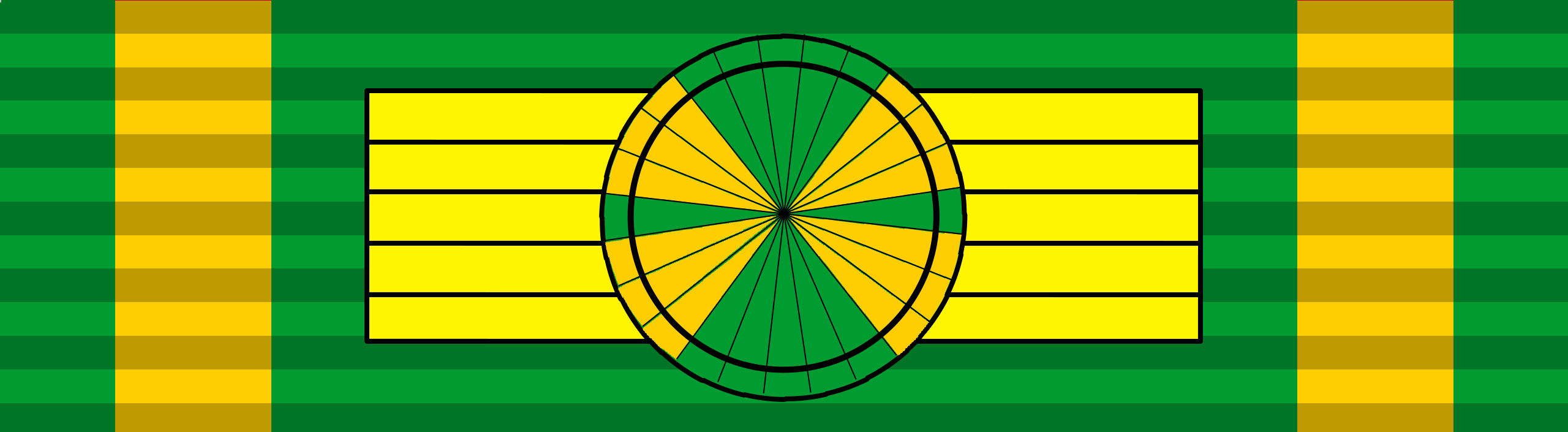
- Order of Abdulaziz al Saud – 12 September 2015

Sweden

- Knight of the Royal Order of the Seraphim – 22 May 2017

United Arab Emirates

- Collar of the Order of Zayed – 17 July 2024

Palestine

- Grand Collar Order of the State of Palestine – 19 August 2024

=== Honorary brevet ===
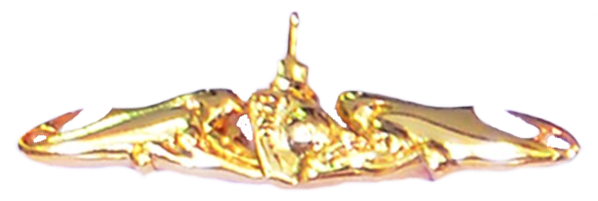
Brevet Hiu Kencana (Golden Shark Brevet) – 28 September 2024

=== Acknowledgments ===
- 2008: Listed by Tempo as one of the 'Top 10 Indonesian Mayors of 2008'.
- 2012: Ranked 3rd at the 2012 World Mayor Prize for "transforming a crime-ridden city into a regional centre for art and culture and an attractive city to tourists".
- 2013: Nominated as the global mayor of the month by the City Mayors Foundation, based in London.
- 2013: Listed as one of "The Leading Global Thinkers of 2013" in Foreign Policy Magazine.
- 2014: Listed by Fortune as one of "The World's 50 Greatest Leaders".
- 2016–2017, 2024: List by "The Muslim 500" as one of the most influential Muslims in the world, which ranked 11 in 2016 and 13 both in 2017 and 2024.
- 2017: Received the award for "Best Gratification Reporting" from the Corruption Eradication Commission (KPK).
- 2022: Received "Certificate of Acknowledgement" from International Rice Research Institute. IRRI has recognized Indonesia's resilient agricultural and food systems and rice self-sufficiency in 2019–2021.
- 2022: Received "Imam Hasan ibn Ali Peace Prize" from Abu Dhabi Forum for Peace.
- 2022: Received "Global Citizen Awards" from Atlantic Council. The Global Citizen Award is an award for figures who are considered to have made great contributions to overcoming poverty, climate change and equality.
- 2023: Received the title of "Father of Nusantara Unity and Culture" from the Indonesian Christian Youth Movement (GAMKI).
- 2024: Received the award as the "Father of Indonesian Construction". The award was given by the Indonesian National Construction Implementation Association (Gapensi).
- 2024: Received "FAO Agricola Medal" from Food and Agriculture Organization for making great progress in transforming Indonesia's agrifood system within the context of sustained economic growth, even in the face of global challenges and uncertainties, including the COVID-19 pandemic.
- 2024: Awarded the title of "Honorary Citizen" by the Mobile Brigade Corps (Brimob), Indonesian National Police (Polri).
- 2024: Awarded the honorary medal of public security and safety "Loka Praja Samrakshana" by the Indonesian National Police (Polri) for his major role in the development of the Bhayangkara Corps organization.

=== Customary titles ===
- 2014: Received the title "Ki Jaka Winata". This title was given by the traditional community of Garut, West Java.
- 2015: Received the customary title "Biji Nagara Madafalo" or Yang Dipertuan Agung Anak Negara from the Sultanate of Tidore, North Maluku.
- 2016: Crowned as Dayak King with the title "Raja Haring Hatungku Tungket Langit" by the Dayak Customary Council (DAD) of Central Kalimantan, meaning wise king with a noble personality and supporter of national unity. This title serves as a token of appreciation from the Dayak people to President Joko Widodo, who is recognized as a capable leader of the Indonesian nation and a unifying force for national unity.
- 2017: Received the honorary customary title "Upu Kalatia Kenalean Da Ntul Po Deyo Routnya Hnulho Maluku" from the people of Maluku because he was considered a great leader who cared deeply about the welfare of the people's lives.
- 2017: Awarded the customary title "Kapiteng Lau Pulo" from the Tanah Bumbu Customary Institution, South Kalimantan.
- 2018: Given the customary name "Kambepit" with the title "Panglima Perang Adat Asmat" from the Asmat People.
- 2018: Received customary title "Tuanku Sri Indera Utama Junjungan Negeri" from Sultanate of Deli.
- 2018: Received the award as "Pinisepuh" of the Pasundan Association.
- 2018: Received customary title "Rajo Balaq Mangku Nagara" from Komering people, South Sumatra.
- 2018: Received customary title "Datuk Seri Setia Amanah Negara" from Riau Malay Customary Institution.
- 2019: Received the title "Derayen Acang Aco" from the traditional figure of Dayak Laundayeh in the Krayan region. Derayen Acang Aco means a great leader who is able to do and exert all efforts for the progress, welfare, and prosperity of his people.
- 2022: Received the customary title "Mosalaki Ulu Beu Eko Bewa" from the Ende Community, which means leader of the entire Indonesian region from Sabang to Merauke.
- 2022: Awarded the Customary Honorary Title of the Sultanate of Buton "La Ode Muhammad Lakina Bhawaangi yi Nusantara".
- 2022: Crowned as Prince of the Sultanate of Ternate with the title "Kaitjil". Kaitjil was the prince or first line of the Sultan of Ternate.
- 2022: Awarded the title "Dada Madopo Malomo" by the Sultan of Ternate which means great leader.
- 2023: Received a customary title from the Dayak tribe while visiting West Kutai, East Kalimantan. The customary title received was "Ajiq Tatau Narakng Bulau, Penimakng Sookng Matiiq, Penerajuuq Bawe Ayaakng". The title has the meaning of having the right and authority to form and determine the best sons and daughters of the nation to carry out tasks aimed at peace and prosperity.
- 2023: Received customary title "Marambe Ambaralla Palunglaa Porodisa" from Talaud Customary Council.

=== Named after him ===
- JKW Reservoir in Nusantara Capital City.
- Joko Widodo Building at the Nahdlatul Ulama University (UNU) Yogyakarta in Sleman Regency, Yogyakarta.
- Joko Widodo Library at the Islamic University of Malang (Unisma) in Malang City, East Java.
- Jokowi Alley in Gunungpati District, Semarang City, Central Java.
- Jokowi Alley in Kelimutu Subdistrict, Ende Tengah District, Ende Lio Regency, East Nusa Tenggara.
- Jokowi Bridge in Magelang Regency, Central Java.
- Jokowi Bridge in Sragen Regency, Central Java.
- Jokowi Hill at the Mandalika Circuit, Central Lombok Regency, West Nusa Tenggara.
- Jokowi Hill in Jayapura City, Papua.
- Jokowi Iriana Park on Trikora Street, Kaimana City Subdistrict, Kaimana District, Kaimana Regency, West Papua.
- Jokowi Learning Center Building at Kebangsaan Senior High School, South Lampung Regency, Lampung.
- Jokowi Park at Pluit Reservoir in Penjaringan District, North Jakarta City, Jakarta.
- Jokowi Park in Anggrem, Padarni Subdistrict, West Manokwari District, Manokwari Regency, West Papua.
- Jokowi Park in Banyuaeng Village, Karangnongko District, Klaten Regency, Central Java.
- Jokowi Street in Tegalpete Hamlet, Solodiran Village, Manisrenggo District, Klaten Regency, Central Java.
- President Joko Widodo Mosque in Abu Dhabi, United Arab Emirates.
- President Joko Widodo Street in Abu Dhabi, United Arab Emirates.

=== Statues ===
- Jokowi Statue on the peak of Mount Sunu, Sunu Village, South Amanatun District, South Central Timor Regency, East Nusa Tenggara.
- Jokowi Wax Statue at Madame Tussauds Museum in Hong Kong Special Administrative Region of the People's Republic of China.
- Juma Jokowi in Kutambelin Village, Karo Regency, North Sumatra.
- President Joko Widodo Statue in Krajan Hamlet, Jambewangi Village, Sempu District, Banyuwangi Regency, East Java.
- Speed Jokowi at the Mandalika Circuit, Central Lombok Regency, West Nusa Tenggara.

Political offices
Preceded by Susilo Bambang Yudhoyono	President of Indonesia; 20 October 2014 – 20 October 2024	Succeeded by Prabowo Subianto
Preceded by Fauzi Bowo; Fadjar Panjaitan (acting)	Governor of Jakarta; 2012–2014	Succeeded by Basuki Tjahaja Purnama
Preceded by Slamet Suryanto	Mayor of Surakarta; 2005–2012	Succeeded by F. X. Hadi Rudyatmo
Party political offices
Preceded by Megawati Sukarnoputri	Indonesian Democratic Party of Struggle nominee for President of Indonesia; 2014, 2019 (won)	Succeeded by Ganjar Pranowo
Diplomatic posts
Preceded by Mario Draghi	Chair of the Group of 20; 2022	Succeeded by Narendra Modi
Preceded by Hun Sen	Chairperson of ASEAN; 2023	Succeeded by Sonexay Siphandone
