= 2010 Surakarta mayoral election =

← 2005	26 April 2010	2015 →
- Turnout: 71.8%
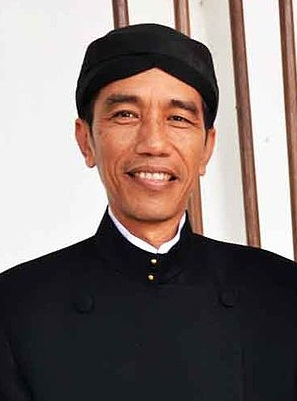
Nominee	Joko Widodo	Edy Wirabhumi
Party	PDI-P	Demokrat
Running mate	F. X. Hadi Rudyatmo	Supradi Kertamenawi
Popular vote	248,243	27,306
Percentage	90.09	9.91
Mayor before election
Joko Widodo
PDI-P
Elected mayor
Joko Widodo
PDI-P

The 2010 Surakarta mayoral election took place on 27 June 2010. The election resulted in a landslide victory for the incumbent mayor Joko Widodo, who won over 90 percent of the votes.

== Candidates ==
The incumbent mayor, Joko Widodo, ran for a second term, with his deputy F.X. Hadi Rudyatmo remaining as his running mate. Aside from their party PDI-P, they were also endorsed by the National Mandate Party and the Prosperous Justice Party. Opposing the pair was the Edy Wirabhumi and Supradi Kertamenawi ticket, who were endorsed by the Democratic Party and Golkar.

== Results ==
Candidate	Votes	Percentage
Joko Widodo	248,243	90.09
Edy Wirabhumi	27,306	9.91

The turnout for the election was the highest among other mayoral elections held in Central Java in that year. The votes were held in 932 polling stations, with Widodo only losing in a single station.
