= Imam Soetopo =

Mayor of Surakarta, Indonesia, 1995–2000

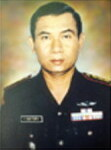

14th Mayor of Surakarta
- In office 9 January 1995 – 12 January 2000
- Preceded by: H. R. Hartomo
- Succeeded by: Slamet Suryanto

Personal details
- Born: 1940 or 1941
- Died: 11 July 2022 (aged 81) Surakarta, Central Java, Indonesia

Military service
- Allegiance: Indonesia
- Branch/service: Indonesian Army
- Years of service: 1965–1995
- Rank: Colonel
- Unit: Infantry

Imam Soetopo (1940/1941 – 11 July 2022) was an Indonesian army officer and politician who served as the mayor of Surakarta between 1995 and 2000. Before becoming mayor, Soetopo served in the army, with his last military office being the commander of the city's military region.

== Early life and military career ==
He was born around 1940 or 1941. He entered the Indonesian Military Academy in 1962 and graduated from the academy in 1965 as an infantry second lieutenant. Following several years of service in the military, Soetopo was promoted to the rank of lieutenant colonel and became Indonesia's military attaché to Singapore. Afterwards, he was promoted again to colonel and was appointed the assistant for operations in the Brawijaya (East Java) Regional Military Command. On 8 July 1988, he was transferred to South Sulawesi and became the commander of the 141st military region in the Bone Regency.

He returned to Java with his appointment as the commander of the 74th military region in Surakarta, the capital of Central Java, in February 1991. During this period, Soetopo ordered the mobilization of soldiers to secure the Kedung Ombo Dam project. He ended his tenure as commander of the military region on 6 November 1992.

== Mayor of Surakarta ==
Soetopo was installed as the Mayor of Surakarta on 9 January 1995, replacing Hartomo. Under the leadership of Soetopo, the city experienced development in tourism infrastructure. The Surakarta-Yogyakarta and the Surakarta-Semarang interprovincial highways as well as the city's bus terminal and train stations were repaired at the start of his term. The runway of the Adisumarmo International Airport, the city's main airport, was extended to meet international standards. These developments in tourism continued in the following years with the construction of starred hotels. The city's income also increased steadily during his term as a result of these developments.

Prior to Soetopo's term, Surakarta was widely known by tourists as "pleasure city" due to the existence of a sizeable red light district located in the outskirts of the city. After the city was named as a "cultural city", Soetopo announced the closure of the red light district in 1998. The prostitutes later protested to the city council's office and demanded the closure to be delayed for three months in order for them to seek alternate sources of income. However, Soetopo ignored these demands and the red light district was destroyed about a month after the announcement.

At the end of his term as mayor, as the city council had failed to elect his replacement in a timely manner, the provincial government appointed Tedjo Suminto to replace him in an acting capacity, beginning on 12 January 2000.

== Personal life ==
Soetopo was married to Siswardinah and had four children.

Soetopo died at the age of 81 at the Kasih Ibu Hospital in Surakarta on the morning of 11 July 2022. Previously, Soetopo was brought to hospital several times after falling and injuring his hips. His body lay in state at the Surakarta mayor's office before his burial in a military ceremony at the North Astana (Astana Oetara) Cemetery in Nunukan, Surakarta.
