= Slamet Suryanto =

Mayor of Surakarta from 2000 to 2005

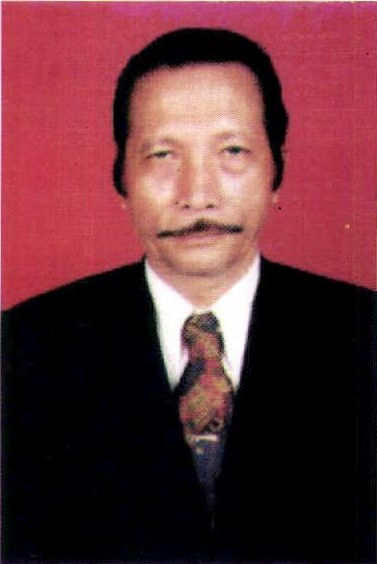
- Official portrait, 1999

15th Mayor of Surakarta
- In office 28 July 2000 – 28 July 2005
- Vice Mayor: J. Suprapto
- Preceded by: Imam Soetopo
- Succeeded by: Joko Widodo

Member of People's Representative Council
- In office 1999–2000

Member of Surakarta City Council
- In office 1985–1990

Personal details
- Born: 1 November 1944 Ponorogo, Japanese Dutch East Indies
- Died: 3 April 2018 (aged 73) Surakarta, Central Java

Slamet Suryanto (1 November 1944 – 3 April 2018) was an Indonesian politician who served as the mayor of Surakarta between 2000 and 2005.

Having been elected member of Surakarta's city council by 1985, he also served a year at the People's Representative Council before becoming mayor. He would lose his re-election to Joko Widodo, and get convicted of corruption. He died in 2018 due to stroke.

== Early life ==
He was born in Ponorogo on 1 November 1944, during the Japanese occupation of the Dutch East Indies. He later studied at Surakarta's state-funded educational institute (IKIP Negeri Surakarta), graduating in 1970. He later studied at Jakarta's National Defense Institute (Lemhanas) in 2001.

== Career ==
He had led the Banjarsari subdistrict office of PDI-P as early as 1980, with him being elected to the city council in 1985 and becoming the party's head for the city in 1999. According to F.X. Hadi Rudyatmo, Suryanto had strongly defended Megawati Sukarnoputri during a schism of the Indonesian Democratic Party. Later, he was elected to the People's Representative Council in the 1999 election, though he resigned after just one year.

He ran for mayor of Surakarta in 2000. Despite being a popular figure there, he could not secure an endorsement from PDI-P city councilors, with only 9 of 23 backing him (executive elections prior to 2004 were done by legislators and not through a popular vote). However, he managed to convince other members of the council, including his later-deputy J. Soeprapto, to support him, and hence secured the mayoral seat.

During his time as mayor, he reconstructed Surakarta's city hall, which was burnt down in 1999 by a mob following Megawati's defeat in the 1999 presidential vote. He became a suspect of a corruption case in 2004 for three projects rife with fake/manipulated budgets, including the city hall's construction.

In 2005, Suryanto failed to secure the endorsement of PDI-P for his reelection, who instead had supported the Joko Widodo/F.X. Hadi Rudyatmo ticket. Suryanto ran anyway, with the support of a coalition of minor parties. For this action, he was penalized by PDI-P. He lost in the election, only winning about 5 percent of votes with Widodo coming on top with around 35 percent.

After his defeat, he was sentenced to 15 months in prison for the city hall's graft case in January 2007. Although the Supreme Court upheld the decision in July 2008, further prosecution of his cases was postponed in 2010 due to his deteriorating health.

== Death ==
He died on 3 April 2018, at around 19:00 local time, due to stroke. He was laid in state at the Surakarta City Hall prior to him being buried in Banjarsari's Bonoloyo funeral.
