= Kaesang Pangarep =

3rd Chairman of the Indonesian Solidarity Party

- Kaesang Pangarep in 2025

3rd General Chairman of the Indonesian Solidarity Party
- Incumbent
- Assumed office 25 September 2023
- President: Joko Widodo; Prabowo Subianto
- Secretary General: Raja Juli Antoni
- Preceded by: Giring Ganesha

Personal details
- Born: 25 December 1994 (age 31) Surakarta, Indonesia
- Party: PSI (since 2023)
- Spouse: Erina Gudono (m. 2022)
- Children: 1
- Parents: Joko Widodo (father); Iriana (mother)
- Relatives: Family of Joko Widodo
- Education: Anglo-Chinese School Singapore (IBDP)
- Alma mater: Singapore University of Social Sciences (BSc)
- Occupation: Politician; YouTuber; entrepreneur
- Website: Instagram account

YouTube information
- Channel: Kaesang Pangarep
- Genres: Vlog; comedy
- Subscribers: 2.52 million
- Views: 252 million
- Last updated: August 2025

Kaesang Pangarep (born 25 December 1994) is an Indonesian politician, entrepreneur, and YouTuber. He is the third and youngest child of former Indonesian president Joko Widodo. In September 2023, he was appointed as chairman of the Indonesian Solidarity Party (PSI).

He is currently the owner of Liga 1 football club Persis Solo along with Erick Thohir.

== Early life and education ==
He graduated from ACS International in Singapore with an International Baccalaureate diploma, and Singapore University of Social Sciences.

== Entertainment career ==
He became popular as a blogger called 'diary anak kampung' or 'mister kacang' in 2011. His writing style is considered creative and funny, which explores his personal life and his relation with his family.

Since 2016, Kaesang has been active on YouTube, and many of his videos went viral because of his sense of humor. His YouTube vlogs became popular; as of May 2017, he had more than 270,000 subscribers. Because of Kaesang's influence, Jokowi created his own YouTube vlog called #JKWVLOG, which gained popularity after posting Jokowi's lunch with King Salman. Kaesang also appeared in the Indonesian television show Mata Najwa to explain his life as the son of Indonesia's president. In 2017, Kaesang released a single song called 'Bersatulah' to promote unity and tolerance among Indonesia's citizens. Kaesang Pangarep made a cameo appearance in the Indonesian movie Cek Toko Sebelah.

== Business career ==
Kaesang is active in the culinary business, owning a chain of banana-centered outlets operating in several cities in Indonesia. He also created a clothing line, featuring images of tadpoles. In addition, he is active as a marketer in a 2017-launched startup called Madhang, which works with culinary SMEs and households. In 2019, he co-founded GK HEBAT, a business incubator focusing on SMEs in the culinary sector. He became the company's CEO. Among other investments, the firm took an 8 percent stake in a publicly listed frozen shrimp products company for Rp 92 billion (~USD 6.5 million).

== Political career ==
=== 2023 Depok mayoral election ===
In 2023, Kaesang stated his intention to run as mayor of Depok in the 2024 mayoral election.

=== Indonesian Solidarity Party ===
The Indonesian Solidarity Party (PSI) voiced its support for Kaesang shortly afterwards, along with the Gerindra Party. He officially became a member of PSI on 23 September 2023, and was appointed as party chairman two days later.

=== 2024 Indonesian general election ===
PSI took part in the 2024 Indonesian general election under Kaesang's leadership. The party failed to secure any seats in the national House of Representatives, although they managed to secure over double the number of Regional Houses of Representatives seats won in 2019.

=== 2024 potential gubernatorial candidacy ===
After the general election, Kaesang was named as a potential candidate for mayoral elections in Bekasi and Surabaya, in addition to Depok. He was also initially considered as a candidate for the Jakarta gubernatorial election, but did not meet the age requirements – Kaesang would be 29 years and 11 months on the date of the election at 27 November 2024, while the minimum age was 30. However, on 30 May 2024, the Supreme Court of Indonesia ruled that the age limitation applied to the date of taking office, not the date of election.

== Personal life ==
Kaesang married Indonesian model Erina Gudono in Yogyakarta, Special Region of Yogyakarta, on 10 December 2022. Their first child, a daughter named Bebingah Sang Tansahayu, was born on 15 October 2024.

== Controversies ==
=== Blasphemy report ===
After creating a video responding to children chanting 'kill Ahok' in a Ramadan rally, Kaesang was reported to the police for blasphemy and hate speech. However, the police found no evidence of blasphemy and dropped the case.

=== Private Jet ===
In August 2024, Kaesang faced significant public scrutiny on social media for using a private jet while travelling to the United States. The incident was discovered by chance on social media, after an inquiry online regarding the cabin windows from Erina Gudono's post on social media. Kaesang private jet usage were coincided with a period of widespread Indonesian local election law protests against the House of Representatives attempt to amend the regional law election in August 2024. BBC reported that the amend is an effort to find a way around existing Constitutional Court of Indonesia court decision (Note: Constitutional Court of Indonesia decision about rejection of petition No. 70/PUU-XXII/2024) to uphold the current minimum age limit of 30-year-old for candidates, which pivotal for Kaesang candidacy in 2024 Central Java gubernatorial election.

This public scrutiny made Erina in the public spotlight for her social media posts that are said to show off a luxurious lifestyle, with netizens called her behavior like Marie Antoinette. Prior to her US trip, Erina announced that she had received a scholarship to study social policy at the University of Pennsylvania. The private jet is known to be Gulfstream G650ER type with tail number N588SE, FAA registration shows that airplane belongs to Garena, a holding company that in the past few years already have relationship with Kaesang and his brother, Gibran Rakabuming Raka in various development projects in Surakarta.

Kaesang then was reported to the Corruption Eradication Commission (KPK) by Indonesian Anti-Corruption Society (MAKI). On 17 September 2024, Kaesang visited KPK, and told the media that he and his wife was hitching their friend on the jet.

Kaesang's August 2024 is not the only trip, another video from the past were circulated where Kaesang and Erina went directly to a car after getting off from same N588SE private jet while bringing numerous shopping bags without going through proper airports customs procedure.
