= 2024 Indonesian local election law protests =

Protests over proposed legislation

- Part of Post-Suharto era in Indonesia
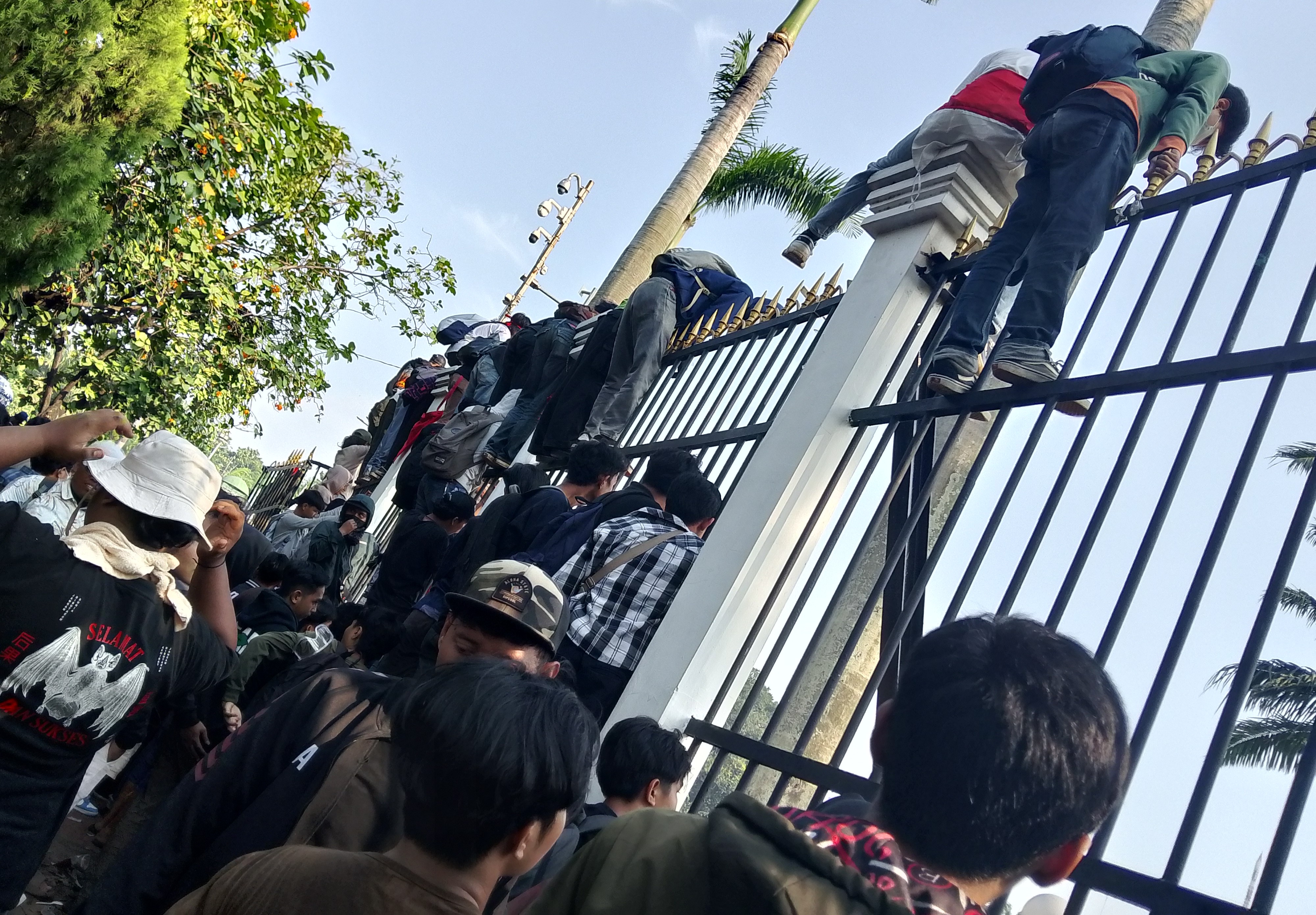
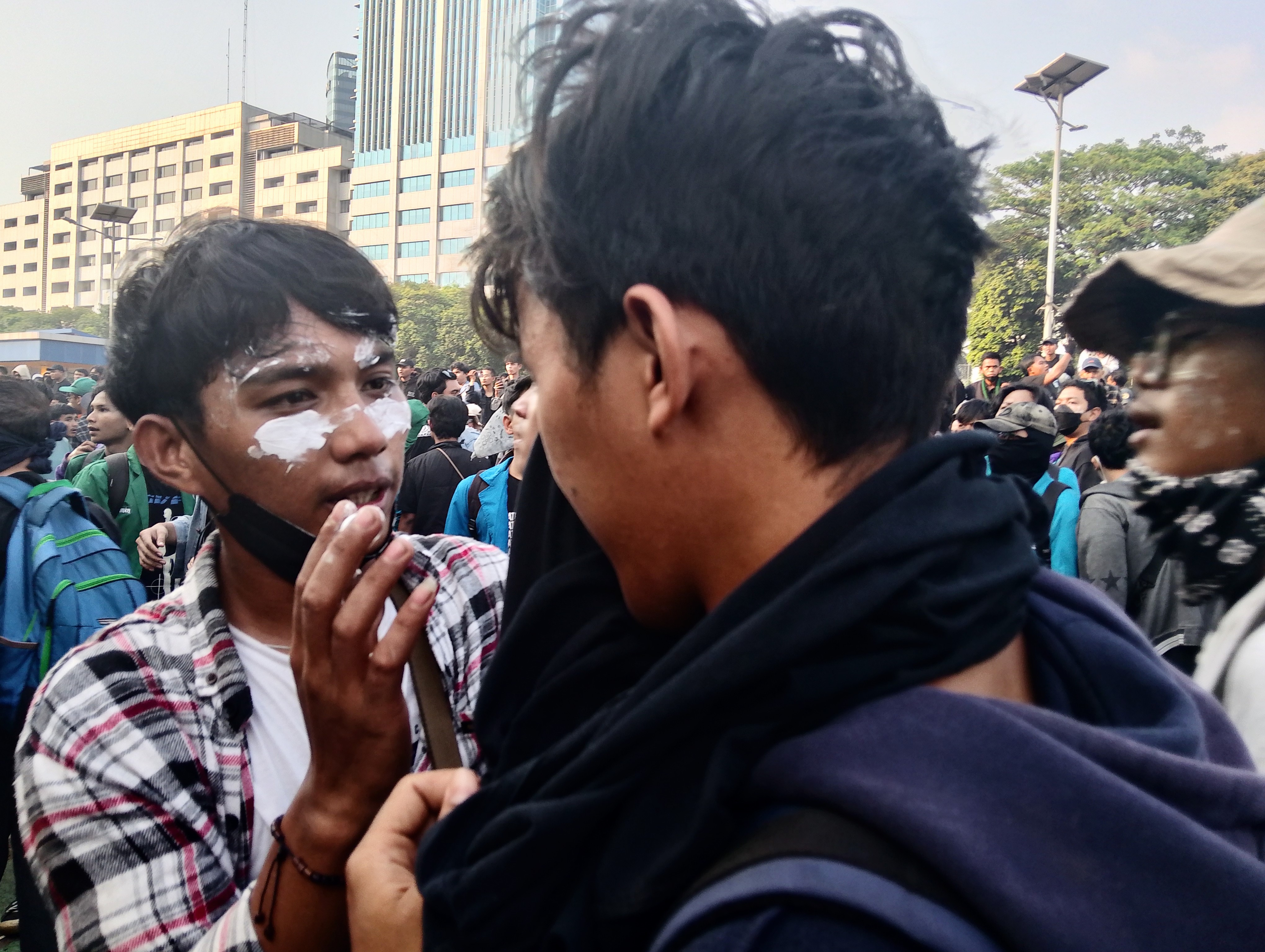
- Protestors climb over a collapsed parliament fence Protestors preparing to face tear gas Student demonstrations in Senayan, Jakarta.
- Date: 22–27 August 2024 (5 days)
- Location: Indonesia (Note: Demonstrations in Jakarta, Medan, Yogyakarta, Bandung, Padang, Surakarta, Surabaya, Semarang, Malang, Makassar, Tasikmalaya, Jambi, Bandar Lampung, Ambon, Bengkulu, Cirebon, Kendari, Palembang, Samarinda, Bekasi, Banjarmasin, Balikpapan, Palu, Gorontalo, Mataram, Kupang, Pekanbaru, Banda Aceh, Palangka Raya, Kediri, Bukittinggi, Langsa, Majene, Luwuk, Bogor, Lhokseumawe, Denpasar, Manokwari, Sorong, Pontianak, and Kuningan)
- Caused by: Actions to ratify the draft fourth amendment to the Law on General Elections of Governors, Regents, and Mayors of Indonesia; Violation of the Constitutional Court of Indonesia's rights committed by the House of Representatives by overturning the court's ruling
- Goals: Cancellation of the ratification of the fourth amendment to the Law on General Elections for Governors, Regents, and Mayors.; Implementation of the 2024 Regional Head General Election in accordance with Constitutional Court Decisions No. 60/PUU-XXII/2024 and No. 70/PPU-XXII/2024
- Methods: Demonstration internet activism student activism protest protest art sit-in vandalism
- Result: The ratification of the bill by the House of Representatives cancelled

Parties
(Indonesia) Protesters and organisations: (no centralised authority): Student unions of various universities; Students' representative council (BEM); High school students; Labour unions; Dissenting parties; Indonesian Democratic Party of Struggle (PDI-P); Labour Party; Constitutional Court of Indonesia (MK); Non-governmental organizations; Indonesian Legal Aid Foundation (YLBHI); University of Indonesia Professors Council; Cross-Press Organization Coalition	Indonesian Government; Advanced Indonesia Coalition Plus (KIM Plus); House of Representatives (except PDI-P); Legislation Committee (Badan Legislasi DPR RI); General Elections Commission (KPU); Supreme Court of Indonesia (MA); Indonesian Army; Military Police; Indonesian National Police; Mobile Brigade Corps

Lead figures
Protesters and organisations: No centralised leadership Political figures: (Indonesia) Megawati Soekarnoputri Chairperson of PDI-P; (Indonesia) Said Iqbal President of Labour Party; (Indonesia) Anies Baswedan Former Governor of Jakarta	Government: Joko Widodo President of Indonesia; Prabowo Subianto President-elect of Indonesia; (Indonesia) Sufmi Dasco Ahmad House of Representative Deputy Speaker

Casualties and losses
122 injured (Note: 19 in Jakarta; 59 in Semarang (Note: On 22 August protest: 26 casualties; On 26 August protest: 33 casualties); 31 in Bandung; 7 in Palu; 4 in Jambi; 1 in Cirebon; 1 in Riau); 460 arrested (Note: 301 in the Parliament area; 159 outside the Parliament)	14 injured (Note: 13 police officers injured; 1 parliament member injured)
- 2 journalists injured

The 2024 Indonesian local election law protests, also known as Emergency Alert for Indonesia (Indonesian: Peringatan Darurat Indonesia) or Indonesian Democratic Emergency (Indonesian: Indonesia Darurat Demokrasi), were public and student-led demonstrations against the House of Representatives for drafting a bill on regional head elections (pilkada) that contradicts the Constitutional Court's ruling and power, intended to regulate the 2024 Indonesian local elections.

The hashtags #KawalPutusanMK or #KawalKeputusanMK (Escort MK's Decision), #TolakPolitikDinasti (Reject Political Dynasty), and #TolakPilkadaAkal2an (Reject Manipulated Local Elections) became widely popular on social media. This online movement culminated in nationwide demonstrations on 22 August 2024, as people took to the streets to express their discontent.

== Background ==
=== Laws of Indonesia and Indonesian Election Laws ===
Major Indonesian rules come in different forms and follow a certain hierarchy as defined by Act No. 12 of 2011 (amended several times most recently with Act No. 13 of 2022). The power of each types of rules is in accordance with the hierarchy, and sitting at the top of the hierarchy is the Indonesian Constitution. While there exists other forms of rules beyond the ones in the hierarchy, such rules only have the force of binding if it is ordered by higher rules or established by an authority granted by other rules. (Note: According to article 7, article 8, and explanation of article 8 of the Act No. 7 of 2011 on the Creation of Rules) One type of major rules is Acts and one type of other rules is General Elections Commission Rules (Peraturan KPU).

Since 2017, elections for public offices in Indonesia are regulated by two separate Acts, both of which are continuously amended: Act No. 7 of 2017 (amended with Government Regulation in-lieu-of Act No. 1 of 2022, as ratified by Act No. 7 of 2023), known as General Election Law, for the presidential and legislative elections (DPR, DPD, and DPRD); and Act No. 1 of 2015 (amended with Act No. 10 of 2016), known as Local Election Law, for the regional heads (governors, mayors, and regents). Further provisions to implement the Acts are governed through various forms of rules, notably through General Election Commission Rules.

One way to amend rules in Indonesia is through a Supreme Court or Constitutional Court ruling. The Constitutional Court has the authority to test whether an Act violates the Indonesian Constitution, while the authority to test whether any forms of rules under Acts violate certain Acts is granted to the Supreme Court. (Note: According to article 9 section 1 and article 9 section 2 of the Act No. 7 of 2011 on the Creation of Rules)

=== October 2023 Constitutional Court ruling ===
On 16 October 2023, in response to the case number 90/PUU-XXI/2023 filed by a student and a self-acclaimed fan of Gibran Rakabuming Raka (President Joko Widodo's son) named Almas Tsaqibbirru, the Constitutional Court amended the General Election Law (Act No. 7 of 2017) to allow people under the minimum age of 40 years old to stand for the presidency or vice-presidency as long as they are currently or have previously held a public office that is elected through elections, including regional head elections. This allowed the 36-year-old Gibran, who at the time was the Mayor of Surakarta, to take part in the 2024 presidential election as a vice presidential candidate just 3 days before the registration period started. The ruling attracted criticism because the then Chief Justice Anwar Usman is President Widodo's brother-in-law and Gibran's uncle.

In November 2023, The Constitutional Court Ethics Council (MKMK) ruled that Anwar Usman had committed serious ethical violations during his handling of the October 2023 case. Due to his actions, the court ordered his removal from the Chief Justice position. However, the court rejected the request to carry out an assessment on, cancel, correct, or review the controversial ruling.

Gibran himself later became the running-mate of Defence Minister Prabowo Subianto and together they won the 2024 election becoming the president and vice president-elect.

=== May 2024 Supreme Court ruling ===
On 29 May 2024, responding to the petition number 23 P/HUM/2024 from the Garuda Party, the Supreme Court decided to amend Article 4 Section 1 of the General Elections Commission Rules (PKPU) No. 9 of 2020 on the Nominations for the Election of Governor and Deputy Governor, Regent and Deputy Regent and/or Mayor and Deputy mayor. The court stated that the provision is not in accordance with the Local Election Law (Act No. 1 of 2015) as revised by Act No. 10 of 2016, and changed the age requirement for governor and vice governor candidates from 30 years old calculated during the determination of the candidate pair to 30 years old calculated during the inauguration. This ruling once again benefitted President Widodo's son, this time Kaesang Pangarep. Before the ruling, Kaesang was unqualified for the governorship or vice-governorship as he would still be 29 years old on 22 September, the candidate pair determination date, and will only turn 30 on 25 December. Thus, moving the calculation to the inauguration date will allow him to reach 30 before the calculation date and make him qualified for the registration.

=== August 2024 Constitutional Court rulings and the Local election law revision controversy ===
Undang-Undang Republik Indonesia Nomor 10 Tahun 2016

On 20 August 2024, the Constitutional Court read their decisions on several cases, two of which are cases number 60/PUU-XXII/2024 and 70/PUU-XXII/2024.

The Constitutional Court's position is the ultimate arbiter of a regulation's conflict with the Basic Law. The House of Representatives (DPR) refused to implement the Constitutional Court's decision by stipulating that the age limit for regional head candidates would only take effect after the inauguration of the 2024 election winners, in accordance with the May 2024 Supreme Court's decision on case No. 23 P/HUM/2024. This interpretation contradicts the Constitutional Court's decision on case No. 70/PUU-XXII/2024, which stipulates that the age limit for regional head candidates takes effect at the time of determining the candidates.

The House of Representatives also only partially followed the Constitutional Court's decision on case number 60/PUU-XXII/2024 regarding the removal of the party seat requirement in the Regional House of Representatives to nominate regional head candidates. The drafted Rancangan Undang-Undang (RUU) PIlkada (Regional Head Election Bill) only applies the removal to parties that did not have seats. On the other hand, the DPR immediately approved when General Elections Commission implemented the October 2023 Constitutional Court's decision on case number 90/PUU-XXI/2023 into KPU regulations related to relaxing the age requirements in the 2024 Indonesian presidential election.

This action was then formulated into the Regional Head Election Bill in a relatively short period of time. The proposal is widely considered to only benefit certain candidates who are related to the Widodo family, perceived as the shift of Indonesian democracy into a state of "monarchy" and nepotism. The buzz around this topic caused the hashtag #KawalPutusanMK and Indonesia Emergency Alert to emerge as one of the trending topics on social media X.

==== Party reactions ====
Indonesian Democratic Party of Struggle (PDI-P) was the only faction to openly oppose this move by the Badan Legislasi (Baleg) of DPR (Legislation Committee of the House of Representatives). PDI-P has attempted to stop the bill by rejecting its proposal during the Legislation Committee meeting and being absent for the plenary meeting so that the meeting did not meet the quorum. The meeting to pass the Regional Head Election Bill would then be postponed, and ultimately cancelled.

Meanwhile, National Awakening Party (PKB) exhibited ambiguity regarding the Regional Head Election Bill. This was evident from a statement by Muhaimin Iskandar, the Deputy Speaker of the House of Representatives, who claimed to be unaware of the agenda for drafting the bill. Additionally, Luqman Hakim from the PKB faction did not attend the plenary session. However, despite these mixed signals, the PKB faction, in general, supported the bill.

Gelora Party has also taken an ambiguous stance on this issue. Although initially favorable towards the bill, the party's position became uncertain after Fahri Hamzah, a prominent party figure, expressed his disappointment with the Constitutional Court's decision, which he believed went against the party's demands. Gelora Party considered suing the Constitutional Court, aiming to secure the right for parties without seats in the House of Representatives to nominate their own regional leaders.

=== Kaesang and Erina's lifestyle ===
Although not directly related, Kaesang Pangarep and his wife, Erina Gudono, drew condemnation from Indonesian netizens because of their luxury travels at the time when the demonstrations occurred. Kaesang and his wife allegedly took the luxury private jet Gulfstream G650 from Jakarta to Los Angeles for holiday before taking Erina to Philadelphia, Pennsylvania, for her Master's studies. An investigation by The Straits Times revealed that the plane was formerly delivered to Singaporean based company, Garena, on 15 July 2021, before it was bought by the Bank of Utah’s trust on 29 December 2022. Garena's parent company, SEA Ltd did not comment by request for more information. Garena was one of the main sponsors to the Persis Solo football club, which is co-owned by Kaesang Pangarep.

Erina also shared Instagram stories of her luxury travels in the United States, which included the purchase of a lobster roll that cost an estimated Rp 400,000 and a baby stroller costing Rp 21 million. These raised the ire of netizens, leading to Erina being compared with Marie Antoinette. With many netizens requoting the words of "let them eat cake!" attributed to her and comparing the lobster roll that Kaesang gave to his wife with the salary of some honorary teachers, which is equivalent to or less than Rp 400,000. Indonesian netizens proceeded to send mass emails to the University of Pennsylvania, imploring them to revoke Erina's partial scholarship. Indonesian netizens were then quick to find out where the two were staying in the United States after another two portraits taken by Erina were found to closely match the interiors of the Four Seasons Hotel at Mandalay Bay in Las Vegas and the Four Seasons Beverly Wilshire Hotel in Los Angeles before heading to "Philly." With the cheapest room at Mandalay Bay costing Rp 29.96 million per night and at Beverly Wilshire around Rp 16 million per night, Suara estimated that just the amount spent on one night at Beverly Wilshire could have been enough to pay the salaries of at least 40 honorary teachers in Indonesia. Erina herself was once considered as a candidate to be the Regent of Sleman.

A video surfaced showing Kaesang and Erina disembarking from a private jet in Surakarta, confirmed the type of aircraft they were using being a Gulfstream G650. The footage also captured the group moving a large number of shopping items from the United States and loading them into a Toyota Alphard that had been parked on the apron. The video sparked outrage among netizens, who were angered by the fact that the items seemed to bypass inspection, immigration, and customs procedures. Nirwala Dwi Heriyanto, the Director of Communication and User Guidance of Customs Services at the Directorate General of Customs and Excise (Bea Cukai), stated that all items must undergo customs checks, with no exemptions for private planes except on domestic flights. He also mentioned that an investigation into the matter was underway. In response to the criticisms from netizens regarding the flight, Silfester Matutina, Deputy General Manager of the Prabowo-Gibran National Campaign Team, defended Kaesang's use of the private jet by stating that "Many people also use private jets."

== Indonesian emergency warning ==
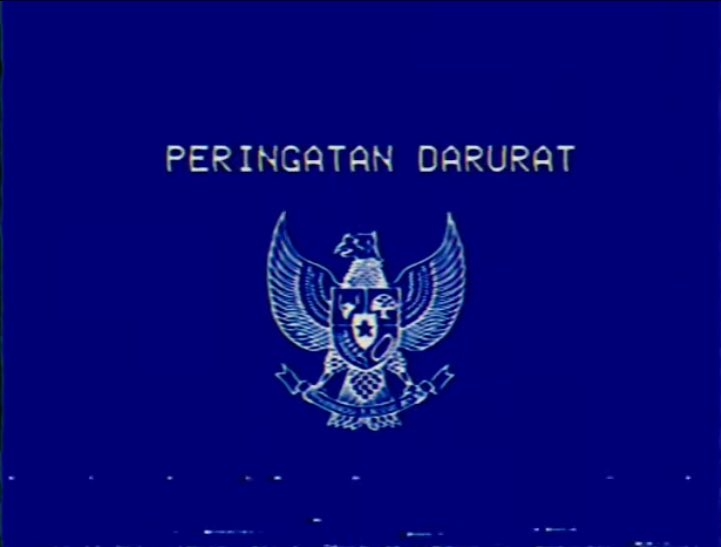
A fictional blue Emergency Alert System (EAS) screen, conceptualized by the EAS Indonesia Concept Youtube channel, was widely circulated prior to and during the protests

‘Peringatan Darurat’ (English: Emergency Alert) is an internet meme that became the impetus for the Regional Head Election Bill rally on 22 August 2024. This phenomenon is in the form of uploaded images, screenshots, and short videos with a dark blue background with the Garuda Pancasila symbol and white emergency warning text, which resembles Emergency Alert Systems used in several countries. The meme became known as the Blue Garuda. The image comes from the short film with the analog horror genre entitled ‘EAS Indonesia Concept (24/10/1991), ANM-021 (Mesem) - First Encounter’ uploaded by the EAS Indonesia Concept YouTube channel. The short film features an air raid siren and a jingle taken from a 1970s Soviet Georgian television as its signature sound effect.

This phenomenon was initiated by the upload of the meme on X by the @BudiBukanIntel account on Wednesday (21/08) at 8:12 (WIB). This post was a response to the post by the @PJalawira account as a joke, to an image with the hypothetical story of the occupation of government offices by the military due to an "ongoing constitutional crisis". This discussion occurred during the Legislation Committee meeting which was discussing the Regional Head Election Bill, considered to be a violation of the constitution. Subsequently, this ‘emergency warning’ image was widely used by social media users as a symbol of protest against the DPR for violating the constitution. Public figures such as Najwa Shihab, Bivitri Susanti, Joko Anwar, and Pandji Pragiwaksono also shared the ‘emergency alert’ image on various social media channels. Community accounts, NGOs, campuses, and mass group accounts also used this image to gather, consolidate, and provide support for protests on the ground. Garuda Biru's post was later amplified by artists by releasing graphic art with a dark blue background. The public referred to the dark blue color in the "Emergency Warning" meme as "resistance blue" (Indonesian: biru perlawanan). Later, this symbol was juxtaposed with the light blue color used by the Advanced Indonesia Coalition and the Prabowo-Gibran 2024 Campaign that referred by the public as "oligarch blue" (Indonesian: biru oligarki).

Garuda Biru was also used by musicians when they performed on stage at various music festivals, such as Hindia, Kunto Aji, Danilla Riyadi, BAALE, Reality Club, Feel Koplo, as well as Juicy Luicy, and Adrian Khalif.

== Issues ==
In general, the main issue raised during the demonstrations were criticisms of the DPR regarding the plan to ratify the new Local Elections Bill, because it defies the Constitutional Court's decision. However, other issues were also raised, varying at each demonstration points and location, such as:

- Asking Joko Widodo to not interfere in the 2024 Indonesian local elections
- Rejecting the return of TNI/Polri dual function (Dwifungsi) in the civilian government
- Ratify the Asset Confiscation Bill
- Ratify the Indigenous People's Bill
- Repeal the People's House Saving Law (Act No. 4 of 2016, i.e. UU TAPERA)
- Revoking and revising Ministry of Education, Culture, Research, and Technology Rule No.2 of 2024
- Resolving cases of gross human rights violations
- Investigating cases of police repressive action
- Repeal the Omnibus Law on Job Creation (Government Regulation in-lieu-of Act No. 2 of 2022, as ratified by Act No. 6 of 2023)
- Reevaluate poverty figures
- Rejecting commercialization of universities
- Implementation of Ministry of Education, Culture, Research, and Technology Rule No. 30/2021 concerning sexual violence prevention.

== Protests ==
=== Political protest ===
The spread of the "Peringatan Darurat" message was used as a rallying call for demonstrations at several points across Indonesia. Among many other Indonesian cities, these protests were mostly initiated by university students in their respective provinces, with the protests turning violent and several protests ending up with students occupying local government buildings.

==== In Jakarta ====
A Wikipedian covers the situation on the ground as protesters tries to barge inside the left wing entrance gate of DPR

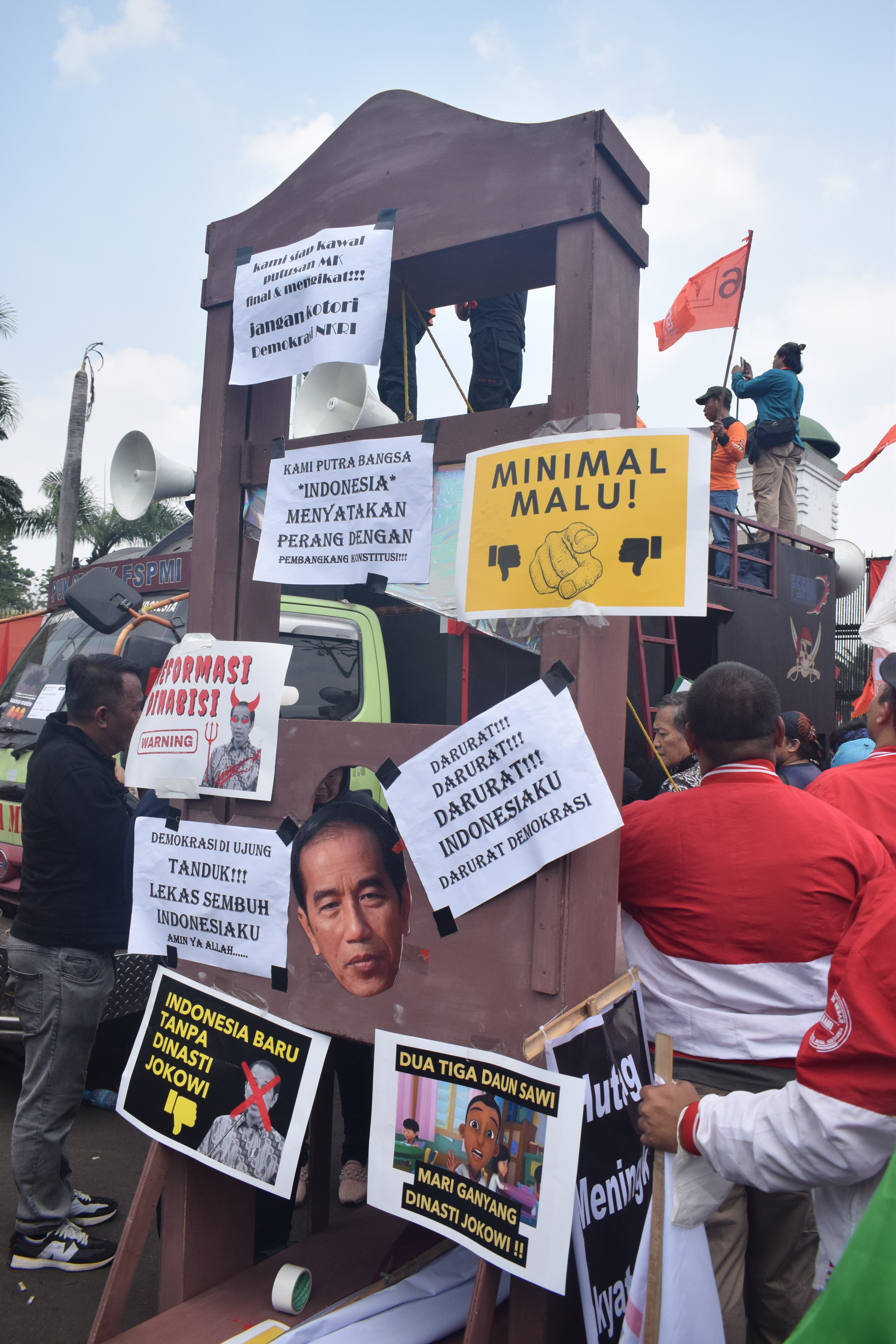
A miniature of guillotine, with the face of Jokowi resting below, at the protest. Plastered with Anti-Jokowi papers. One reads, "At least be ashamed!"

On 22 August 2024, a demonstration in front of the House of Representatives was attended by thousands of people, which led to 3,200 officers being deployed for security. A similar demonstration also took place in front of the Constitutional Court Building. At 14:20 (WIB), the crowd broke down the right gate of the House of Representatives Building. Coincidentally, the 828th Thursday Action in front of the Istana Negara also became a mass gathering point. This protest carried a replica of the guillotine knife that symbolises resistance to monarchy, first seen in the French revolution. This protest was not only attended by masses of workers and students, but also by celebrities such as film activists Joko Anwar and Reza Rahadian; solo comedians such as Arie Kriting, Mamat Alkatiri, Abdur Arsyad, Ananta Rispo, Rigen Rakelna, and Bintang Emon. Several figures such as Halida Hatta (daughter of the first Indonesian Vice President Mohammad Hatta), Tom Lembong (former Indonesian Minister of Trade), Mudji Sutrisno, also attended the protest.

Habiburrokhman (wearing white shirt) announcing the cancellation of the bill revision. Habiburrokhman was constantly thrown with water bottles while standing at the command truck.

At 14:20 (WIB), the crowd tore down the right gate of the House of Representatives, followed by the collapse of the rear gate by another group of protesters on 17:30 (WIB). One of the members of the House of Representatives, Habiburokhman, was hit by a bottle thrown by the protesters. The protest lasted into the night and police were recorded as beating, using tear gas, and firing water cannons to deal with the crowd. Tempo, Narasi, and IDN journalists were mistreated for trying to cover protesters being beaten by the authorities and were asked to delete their video footage. The director of Lokataru, Delpedro Marhaen, was also mistreated and arrested.

By around 18:00 (WIB), as most of the initial protesters, who were university students, had left the area, a second group composed of high school students arrived, clad with wooden spears and masks, and clashed with the police. The second crowd also damaged two bus stops in front of the building.

Another demonstration was held on 23 August 2024, centred at the KPU RI Building.

==== In Java ====
While in Bandung, the protest was held in front of the West Java DPRD building. At 17:30 (WIB), the DPRD Building fence was torn down and the demonstration turned violent. One journalist was mistreated because he was accused of being an intel and one student lost an eyeball due to stone throwing from the security forces. In Tasikmalaya, the demonstration was characterised by the burning of several facilities in the Tasikmalaya City DPRD building. In Bogor, the protest was held at Tugu Kujang. In Cirebon, one student and one policeman were injured during a demonstration in front of the Cirebon City DPRD Building.

In Yogyakarta, the protest was attended by thousands of people, clad with black clothing and masks in attempt to emulate the successes and symbolism of the 2019 Hong Kong Protestors, starting at the Abu Bakar Ali Parking Lot, walking to the Zero Kilometer Point of Yogyakarta City, and stopping in front of the Yogyakartan DPRD Building.

In Semarang, the protest in front of the Central Java Regional House of Representatives (DPRD Jawa Tengah) Building ended in disorder after the masses forced to enter by attempting to collapse the building's entrance gate, with the police retaliating to disperse thousands of masses with the use of tear gas and water cannons. 26 protesters were injured, with 18 of those protesters hospitalized.

In Surabaya, the demonstration was held in front of the Heroes Monument. In Surakarta, the demonstration was held in front of the City Hall Building. Some students symbolized their protests in walking backwards. According to the coordinator of the Student Executive Body of Greater Surakarta, Rozin Afianto said that the reverse walk as a symbolism for a "Backward Indonesia Cabinet". In Malang, thousands of protesters took to the streets, around the Tugu Malang Roundabout area, turning traffic in the city to a standstill.

==== In Sumatra ====
In Padang, a demonstration was held in front of the West Sumatra DPRD Building. In Bukittinggi, a rally in front of the Bukittinggi City DPRD Building was held by hundreds of people on 23 August 2024 under heavy rain. In Lampung, a rally was held the night before, wearing Money Heist costumes. In South Sumatra, a rally was held at Simpang Lima by hundreds of students wearing masks of politicians such as Joko Widodo, Bahlil Lahadalia, Yusril Ihza Mahendra, Prabowo Subianto, and Bobby Nasution. The protest also included a coffin. In Jambi, thousands of students marched from Bank Indonesia junction to the parliament building in Telanai. The protest ended in chaos after demonstrators were beaten by police. Three people fainted and four were injured. A demonstration in Bengkulu was marred by the mistreatment of students by DPRD security officers when they tried to disperse the crowd. A video of a security guard stomping on a student caused widespread anger. A similar protest took place at the Aceh DPRA, Banda Aceh, which was attended by thousands of students. This protest ended in chaos and five people were arrested. Another demonstration in a different city in aceh also took place, in front of the Lhokseumawe DPRK led to thousands of students clashing with the authorities.

==== Protest in Sulawesi ====
In Makassar, a protest of thousands of people took to the streets to protest the ratification of the Pilkada Bill. There was a tyre burning protest in this demonstration. The demonstration was forcibly disbanded after it was discovered that First Lady, Iriana Jokowi, was going to pass through the road that was being used for demonstrations. On 26 August, in retaliation toward student protests, a counter protest by surrounding residents in AP Pettarani street, destroyed UNM facilities. In Kendari, thousands of people consisting of students and journalists demonstrated in front of the Southeast Sulawesi DPRD building. The protest in Palu was carried out on 23 August 2024 in front of the Central Sulawesi DPRD Building. In Luwuk, the protesters, most of whom were students from Tompotika University, held a long march from their campus to the Banggai Regency DPRD office.

In Majene, demonstrators consisting of students managed to broke into the Majene Regency DPRD office and destroyed all the facilities inside. They forced their way into the plenary session room and into the council leadership. Several students were reported injured after the riots.

==== In Nusa Tenggara and Bali ====
In Kupang, a sit-in demonstration took place in front of the NTT KPU office. In Mataram, the protest ended in chaos after thousands of students in front of the West Nusa Tenggara DPRD Building refused to be dispersed by the police. Forced dispersal was then carried out with tear gas and water cannons.

In Denpasar, the protest was carried out on 23 August 2024 followed by student representatives from various universities in Bali, external student organisations, NGOs in Bali, Non-government organizations in Bali (as the party that assisted from a legal perspective), to the general public.

==== In Maluku and Papua ====
In Ambon, the protest ended in chaos as protesters began to break the glass windows of the building, after the request of the protest masses who were members of the Pattimura Student Alliance to meet DPRD members from the Advanced Indonesia Plus coalition party was rejected because none of the DPRD members came. In Manokwari, the protest was carried out in front of the West Papua DPRD Building. A similar demonstration was held in Sorong, precisely Taman Sorong, by carrying out a silent protest.

==== In Kalimantan ====
In Banjarmasin, thousands of people from various campus elements occupied the South Kalimantan DPRD in a demonstration. While in Samarinda, thousands of people gathered in front of the East Kalimantan DPRD Building to demand the cancellation of the Pilkada Bill and the acceleration of the passing of the Asset Forfeiture Bill. Although their representatives have met DPRD members, the mediation failed and the protests became increasingly violent, as a result, two policemen were injured due to Molotov cocktails. The protest in Balikpapan at the Balikpapan DPRD building turned violent after students pushed each other with the police. A number of students took part in the democracy emergency protest at the West Kalimantan Provincial DPRD in Pontianak, West Kalimantan, on Friday 23 August 2024. In Palangkaraya, the protest of hundreds of students ended in chaos, after the desire to present the Chairman of the Central Kalimantan DPRD was not fulfilled. The masses rejected the proposed conditions, namely that only representatives are allowed to enter the DPR building and have their aspirations heard. In Tarakan, the protest coincided with the inauguration of the elected city parliament members in the 2024 Indonesian general election. This protest later also turned violent, resulting in 11 police and one student injured.

=== Police brutality ===
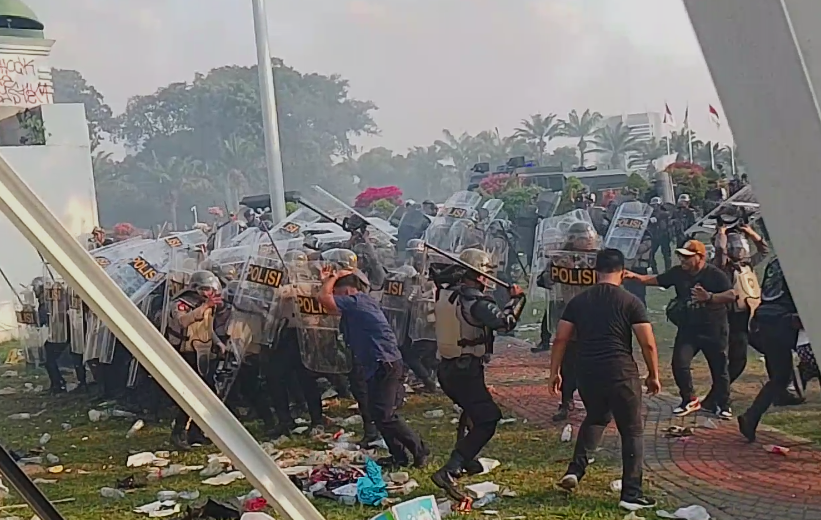
Police and protestors clash at the House of Representatives building. Visible; non-armed protesters getting hit by a baton and an officer slamming his riot shield to protestors in the background.

The police were widely criticised for excessive actions in dealing with protesters, including beatings, the use of tear gas and water cannons, to even kidnappings. One of them was the police brutality against protesters in Palu, where a student suffered a torn ear. A total of 20 people were named as suspects in the vandalism of the DPR RI building fence. On the other hand, a number of parties such as Haidar Alwi from the Haidar Alwi Institute appreciated the security measures taken during the demonstration, where he is known as a Jokowi loyalist and pro-government.

Protestors getting run over by police in an attempt to disperse the protests at the gates of the DPR (19:00PM)

According to the Indonesian Legal Aid Foundation, in Jakarta, the police have started to hunt down students. 11 demonstrators had been confirmed to have been arrested by the police, and one person was publicly doxed without cause by the police. In addition to also received 26 reports with actions in the form of violence, doxing and kidnappings. Whilst also receiving information that hundreds of demonstrators were arrested while on route to the location of the demonstration. The organization has long since advocated for the protestors and urged Indonesian Police to stop committing violence.

Additionally, the Indonesian Army, specifically Kodam Jayakarta, was also involved in violence against protestors.

=== Online activism ===
As a form of protest against Joko Widodo's political dynasty, some social media users and demonstrators called Jokowi by his birth name, "Mulyono", which was changed in a ruwatan ceremony to cleanse diseases according to the Javanese tradition. This action is comparable to deadnaming and is believed by some netizens to be a taboo that can bring bad luck to the owner of the birth name superstitiously. Some netizens and demonstrators also insulted Joko Widodo with the male pregnancy (mpreg) meme through digital and printed protest arts which was previously a trending topic on Twitter to mock patriarchal men behavior through their fragile masculinity.

On 22 August 2024 while the protests was taking place, businessman and celebrity Raffi Ahmad went to accompany Gibran Rakabuming Raka, the vice president-elect and eldest son of President Joko Widodo, to West Bandung. Later in the evening, via social media Instagram, Raffi Ahmad uploaded a screenshot containing the statement of the Deputy Speaker of the House of Representatives regarding the cancellation of the ratification of the Pilkada Bill, which was also affixed with the Prabowo-Gibran 2024 Campaign logo. This upload drew criticism from the public because it was considered to be just an order and did not really care about the aspirations of the community regarding the rejection of the Pilkada Bill. This was based on his attitude which contrasted with several other celebrities who attended the protests. Then on 23 August 2024, Raffi Ahmad uploaded a statement of his political stance supporting the decision of the Constitutional Court. This again drew criticism and was followed by a boycott call against him, Nagita Slavina, and RANS Entertainment. The boycott call was based on his closeness to the government and his support during the 2024 Indonesian election campaign for the Prabowo-Gibran pair, a candidate who is considered the successor to Joko Widodo's political dynasty. Other Prabowo-Gibran supporting celebrities such as Gading Marten, Atta Halilintar, and Kiky Saputri were also targeted by the boycott. In response to the boycott call, Pandji Pragiwaksono asked the public not to politicise the issue and embrace those who want to join despite coming from different camps.

Social media users highlighted the absence of Kiky Saputri, who is known for commenting on national political issues, amidst the presence of several solo comedians at the rally. Through X social media, Kiky Saputri said that she was unable to attend the rally due to work reasons and still supported the rally. She stated that even though she did not attend the rally, she would ‘fight through the inside track’ by communicating directly to the relevant parties. This later received comments from netizens who felt that Kiky Saputri did not have enough influence to be able to convey aspirations personally and her closeness to figures in the government only occurred because she was employed with her status as an internet celebrity. Kiky Saputri also said that she was of the view that the Constitutional Court's decision could not be contested, as when the Constitutional Court issued Constitutional Court Decision No. 90/PUU-XXI/2023 which made Gibran Rakabuming Raka able to run as a vice presidential candidate even though he had not met the minimum age limit to participate in the 2024 elections.

Social media users throwing harsh criticisms on Kaesang's lifestyle also results in insults being thrown to Erina Gudono mostly regarding to her personal hygiene. Rumors regarding to her personal hygiene arose from a picture of her standing next to a student who tried to cover his nose. As Erina will start her masters degree in University of Pennsylvania, social media users throw criticisms at her learning about social justice, calling her insensitive and hypocrite, stating that the 5th principle of the Pancasila has been violated by Jokowi's perceived actions to backslide democracy. Due to personal criticisms and insults thrown at her, many also questioned Erina's mental health facing such issues. Some users also congratulated Kaesang's ex-girlfriends for not marrying him as Kaesang and Erina became a target of insult by the public due to their hedonistic lifestyle.

== Impact ==
=== Political ===
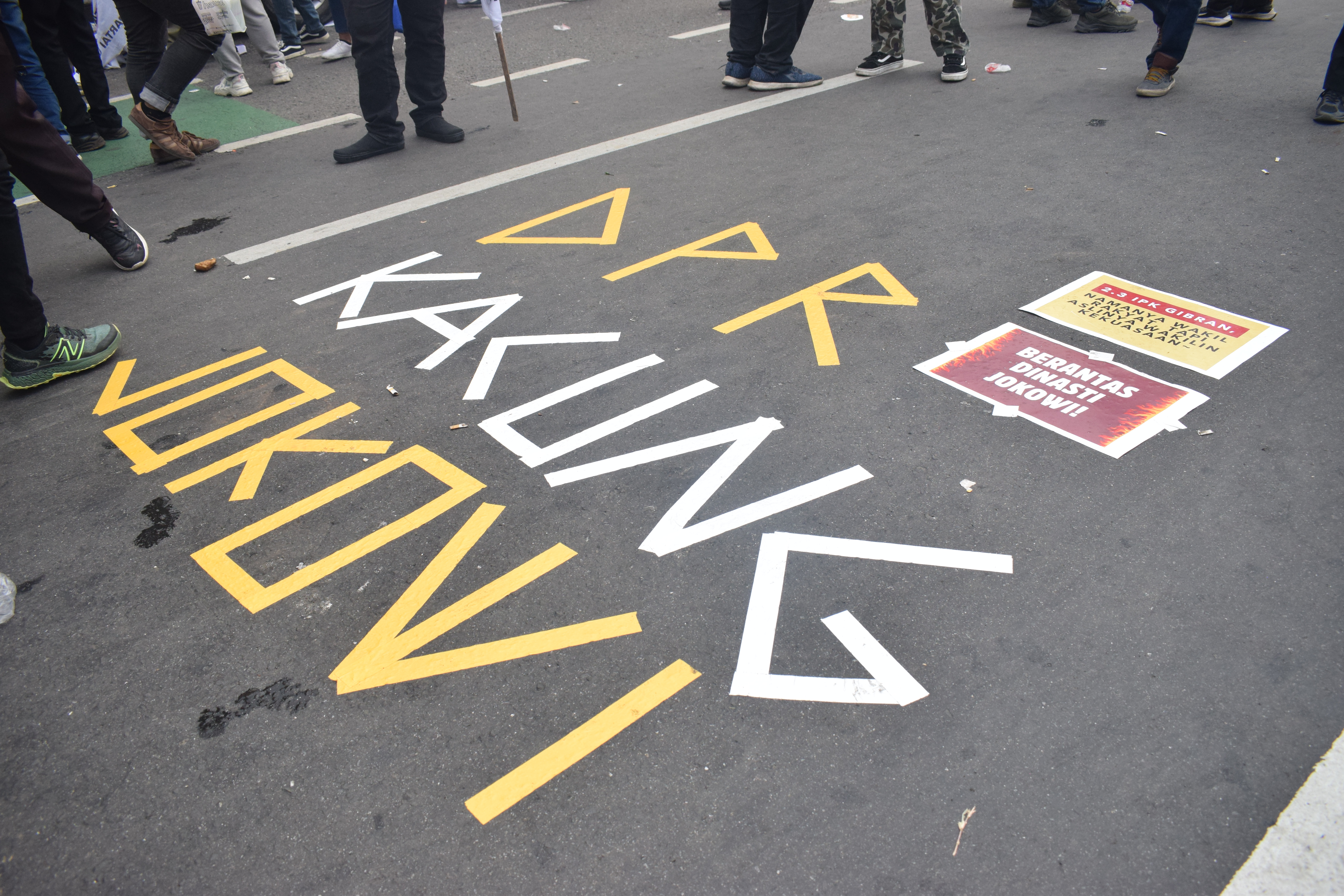
Tape art displaying the words, "The DPR are lackeys of Jokowi" (DPR Kacung Jokowi)

Prosperous Justice Party (PKS) reversed its position on the bill and instead supported its cancellation "in accordance to the people's voice and demands". Similarly, PKB issued a statement of gratitude for the cancellation of the bill, signalling that people's aspirations are still being heard. Democratic Party published a press release on behalf of the party's faction in DPR, stating it would not proceed with the bill. Sufmi Dasco from Gerindra Party stated that the decision of the Constitutional Court (MK) will still be implemented, but the drafted Regional Head Election Bill can be implemented in the next election period.

Former Ministry of Law and Human Rights Hamid Awaludin reported Prabowo Subianto's anger on the sudden maneuvers to change the local election law. Gerindra indirectly either denied or confirm that Prabowo was very furious, but then announced that Prabowo wants to prioritize democracy and obeying laws and regulations.

With the Constitutional Court's ruling upheld, regional parliament threshold of 20% in the 2024 Indonesian local elections has been nullified and more parties are able to field their own candidate pairings in the election. In the roundup of the election candidacies, the Advanced Indonesia Coalition had managed to assemble a grand coalition supporting candidates such as in Jakarta, West Java, Central Java, East Java, and North Sumatra, along with several cities and regencies across Indonesia and Gerindra politician Ahmad Muzani opened up that there are indications that parties will abandon the coalition in favor of their own candidates. PKB chairman Muhaimin Iskandar states that his party will not always be endorsing candidates from the Advanced Indonesia Coalition. The ruling also opens up PDI-P chances to nominate their own candidates albeit in a lower threshold and potentially breaking the coalition up in some parts of Indonesia. According to Aditya Permana of the Algoritma Research and Consulting, this ruling aims to widen the candidate field and to minimize the possibility to run against an empty ballot box.

On 24 August 2024, Gerindra announced that they will recommend Vice Governor Taj Yasin Maimoen to stand for reelection as Ahmad Luthfi's running mate instead of Kaesang Pangarep. Kaesang was reportedly gearing up to run as Ahmad Luthfi's partner in the 2024 Central Java gubernatorial election a few days before the protests occurred. Even after the protests has begun and the House of Representatives reversed the bill, the lawyer in Jakarta High Court states that Kaesang has prepared 3 documents required for him to stand as a candidate, which are a certificate stating that he had never been a defendant, a certificate stating that his voting rights on the voters list had not been revoked and a certificate stating that he had no debts, which gave skepticisms on whether or not the House of Representatives is really serious on repealing their draft bill on local elections. Kaesang later suspended his preparations according to the PSI administration team. PSI further backpedaled by stating that Kaesang had no interest in running in the 2024 Pilkada since the beginning and that he "preferred to concentrate on business and taking care of his family." Despite the setback, the media still report that Kaesang could have run for mayor or regent due to the lower minimum age requirement of 25 instead of 30 for governorship.

Individually, politician Wanda Hamidah announced her resignation from Golkar. She stated that the decision was taken because she "does not want to be on the wrong side of history" and that she loves her country "too much".

=== Economic ===
As protests took place, the IDX Composite (IHSG) fell to 7,497. The rupiah currency weakened to Rp 15,615.00 per US$1, and exchange rate into the euro currency spiked to 17,460.00 IDR per 1 euro (EUR). Chairman of the Indonesian Hotel and Restaurant Association, Hariyadi B Sukamdani, is more concerned about the cause of this action. He feels that political intervention in the legal sphere can have an impact on legal certainty issues that can trigger greater effects if not handled properly and neutrally. After the House of Representatives decided to upheld the Constitutional Court's ruling, the rupiah strengthened to Rp 15,492.00 per US$1.

== Reactions ==
=== Domestic reactions ===
==== Executive government ====
President Joko Widodo's statement on the Constitutional Court's decision in an orchestrated mock up interview organized by the Presidential Secretariat, 21 August 2024.

Jokowi was criticized for making a statement that this was only part of the "checks and balances" function of the Constitutional Court and the House of Representatives, even though the position of the Constitutional Court's decision is final and binding, and is considered the highest in testing between laws and the Constitution. Thus, it is unconstitutional for the House of Representatives to create a new bill to circumvent the decision. On 22 August 2024, at 17:44, a new statement was then made by the head of the Presidential Communication Office, Hasan Nasbi, that the government has complied with the Constitutional Court's decision. Meanwhile, the Minister of Home Affairs stated that he was still waiting for the discussion of the Regional Head Election Bill by the Legislation Committee.

On 23 August 2024, Jokowi in reaction to the wave of protest demanding the government to upheld the Constitutional Court's ruling told the media that he will not issue a government regulations in-lieu-of Acts (Perppu) regarding to local elections after the House of Representatives decided not to ratify the drafted bill and praised the protesters for delivering their aspirations. However, he refused to comment on the failure to pass the bill into law because the quorum is not present, stating that it was the legislative branch's area to respond.

==== Legislative ====
Speaker of the House of Representatives Puan Maharani thanked the demonstrators for their aspirations on the issue and asked the demonstrators to work together to keep the House of Representatives accountable for their acts. Deputy Speaker of the House of Representatives Sufmi Dasco Ahmad who preside the meeting session on the bill states that the drafted bill will not pass and the registration for the election will be done based on the Constitutional Court's ruling. Member of Regional Representative Council from Central Kalimantan Agustin Teras Narang praised the Constitutional Court's ruling, stating that the ruling could reduce the arrogance of political parties in gathering the people's aspiration as well as reducing the high political cost that may have to be incurred by candidates during the election.

However, due to Kaesang's reportedly preparing documents required to stand as a candidate and public distrust of the House of Representatives, skepticism arises on whether the House of Representatives is truly serious in repealing the drafted bill. Herdiansyah Hamzah of the Constitutional and Administrative Law Society (CALS) state that the protesters must continue to voice their aspirations as he believed that the failure is a way to "test the waters" and when public pressure waned, the House of Representatives could try again and make sure the bill will pass into law.

==== General Election Commission ====
The General Elections Commission (KPU) stated that it would still follow the Constitutional Court's decision, but after consulting with the DPR, regarding the rules that had changed because previously it referred to the interpretation of the Supreme Court. On 24 August 2024, a draft of the KPU decision was circulated referring to the MK decision. The KPU confirmed that the information was correct.

== Social media ==
=== International reactions ===
==== Foreign news coverage ====
Reuters covered the protests with the headline "Protests across Indonesia as parliament delays changes to election law", highlighting the dismissive attitude by Jokowi who stated that the role of the Constitutional Court and the House of Representatives in this event was part of "checks and balances". A similar negative highlight was given by the British Broadcasting Corporation (BBC) in a story titled "Election law changes spark mass protests in Indonesia". The BBC reported that the revision of the law was an attempt to scuttle Anies Baswedan, as well as pave the way for Kaesang, who does not meet the minimum age requirement for elections.

South Korea's national media, Yonhap, reported a similar story, suggesting that the DPR's action was aimed at smoothing Kaesang's path in the 2024 Regional Head Election. Meanwhile, Channel News Asia published a story titled "Thousands protest Indonesian parliament's move to subvert court ruling, pave way for Jokowi's son to contest in local elections", which highlighted Jokowi's tendency to pave the way for his children after Gibran was also allowed to run in the presidential election after the Constitutional Court, under the leadership of his brother-in-law, Anwar Usman, changed the rules regarding the age limit.

Malaysian media The Star reported that the demonstrations disrupted the Indonesian economy. Voice of America reported that the influence of this demonstration had spread to various cities in Indonesia. Aljazeera highlighted the strangeness of the sudden ratification process of the bill and it appeared to smoothen Jokowi's steps in building dynastic politics.

==== Individuals ====
International journalist Mario Nawfal in Twitter tweeted his own recap on the several publications from foreign news source regarding the protests. He stated that this demonstration occurred because the DPR gave Kaesang the opportunity to take part in the regional elections by circumventing the age limit.

South Korean musician Jae Park gave his support to the protesters. He said he is aware his stances can affect his chances to perform in a concert at Indonesia but he can't be silent witnessing what has transpired.

== Criticism ==
=== Asset Confiscation Bill ===
Several social media accounts criticized the demonstration because it did not involve demands for the acceleration of the ratification of the Asset Confiscation Bill. Later, this narrative was also amplified by Joko Widodo by demanding the House of Representatives to accelerate the ratification of Asset Consfiscation Bill. In several regional demonstrations, such demands had actually been made, such as those in Palangka Raya, Kediri, Subang, Padang, Buleleng, and Balikpapan. However, Tempo's Fact Check site also stated that this criticism was misleading because this issue was actually part of the demands of the demonstration, including those in Jakarta. Some netizens also criticized this narrative as whataboutism that can divert the focus of the main issue.

=== Counter-narrative ===
In the aftermath of the demonstrations in Jakarta, some social media accounts defending the government (known as 'Buzzers' in Indonesia and comparable to Wumaos or Vatniks) attempted to counter the criticisms by posting sanitized versions of the Indonesian emergency warning image, accompanied by the phrase "Indonesia Baik-Baik Saja" (Indonesia is fine). This effort was aimed at downplaying the severity of the situation and reassuring the public.

Additionally, there were reports of attempts to financially incentivize individuals to spread messages supporting the DPR's decision. Offers were made to pit Anies Baswedan's supporters against PDI-P supporters, but these offers were rejected by the wider public. Similarly, efforts to financially reward individuals for portraying the DPR's decision as being widely accepted also faced rejection by counter-posts and artworks in social media. The DPR denied any involvement in these financial offers.

== Gallery ==
=== In Jakarta ===
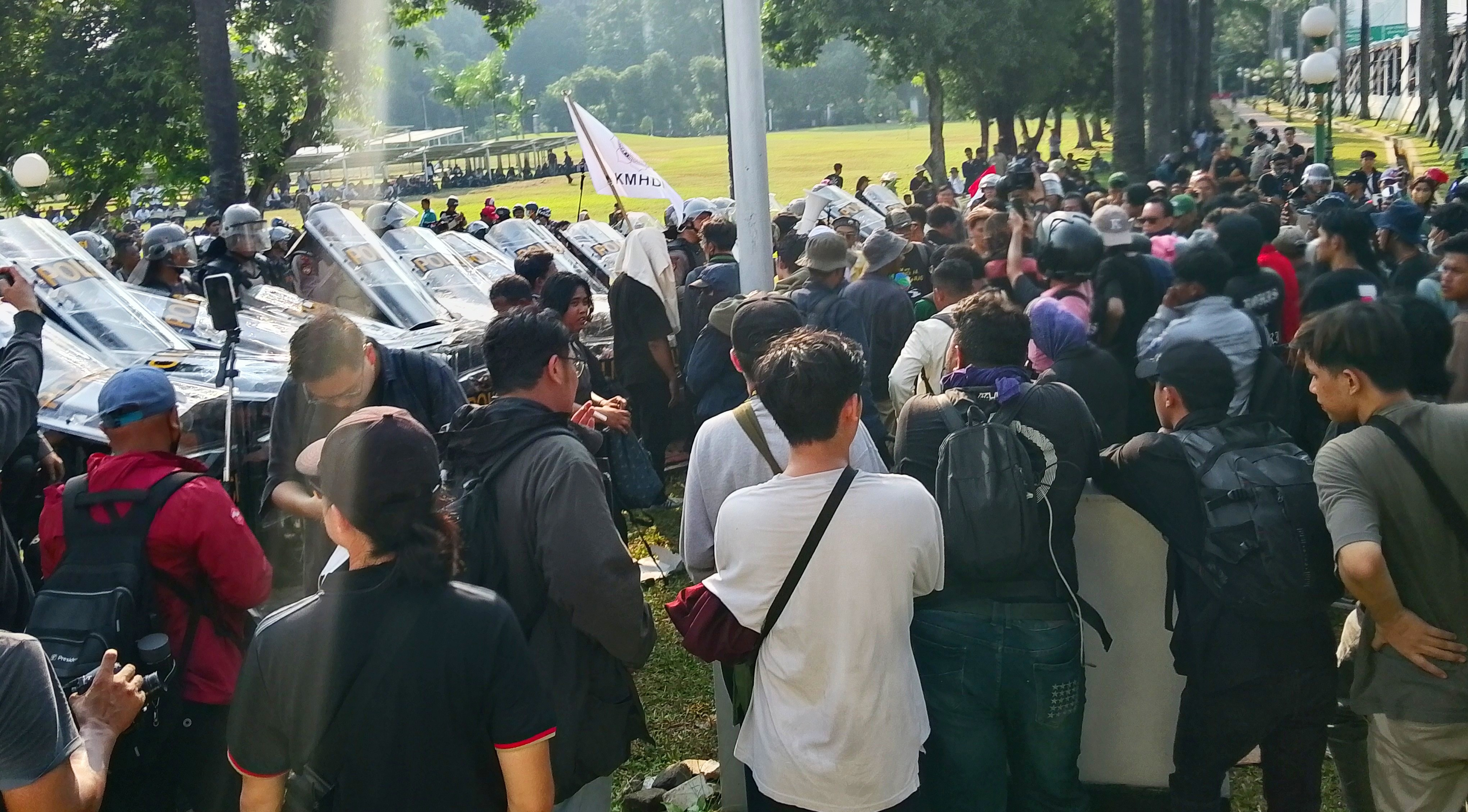
Protestors enter the grounds of the House of Representatives after the right gate was broken down during a demonstration on the regional election bill

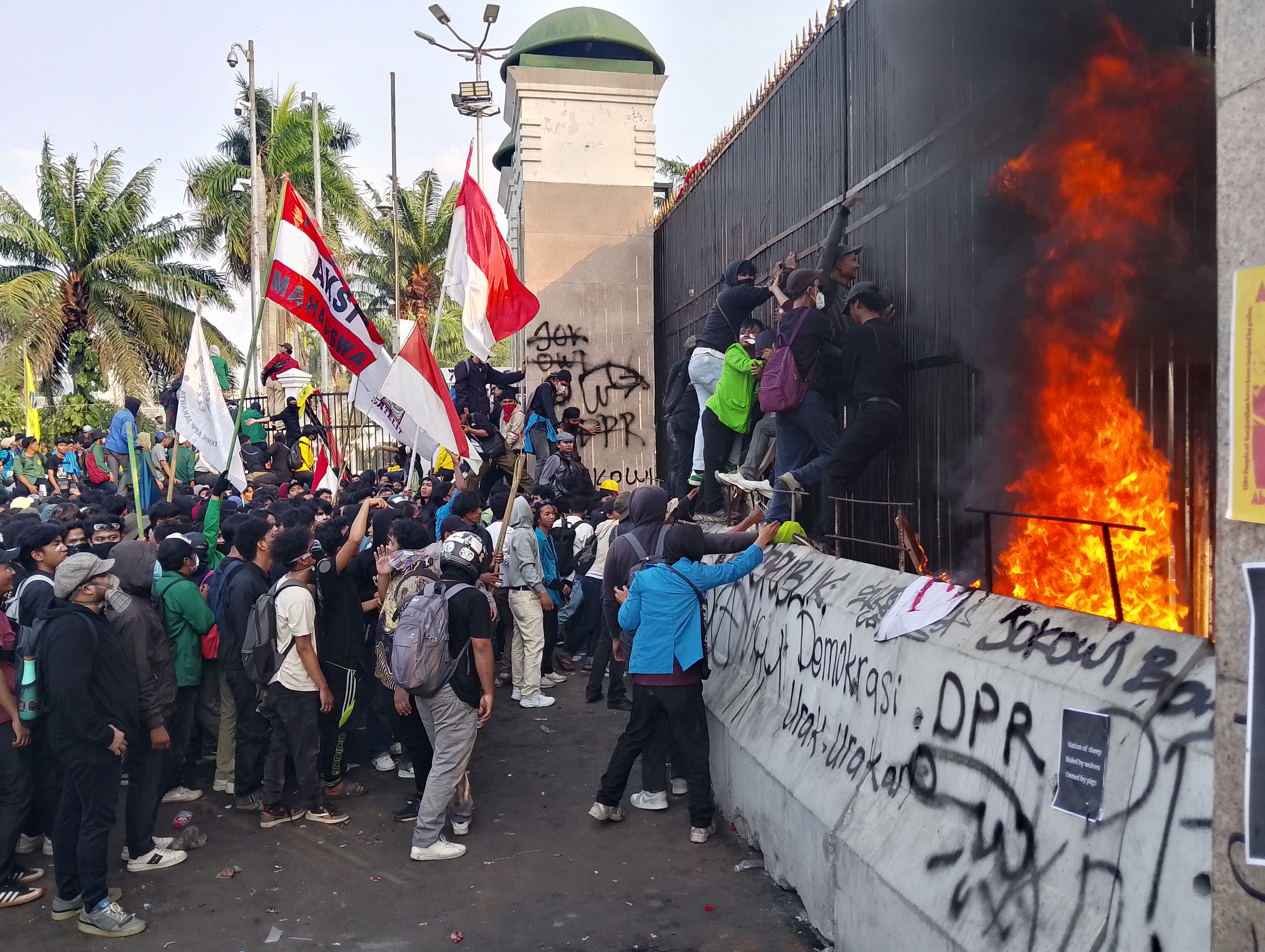
Situation at the Gates of the DPR Building as protestors defaced and set a fire pit to the entrance

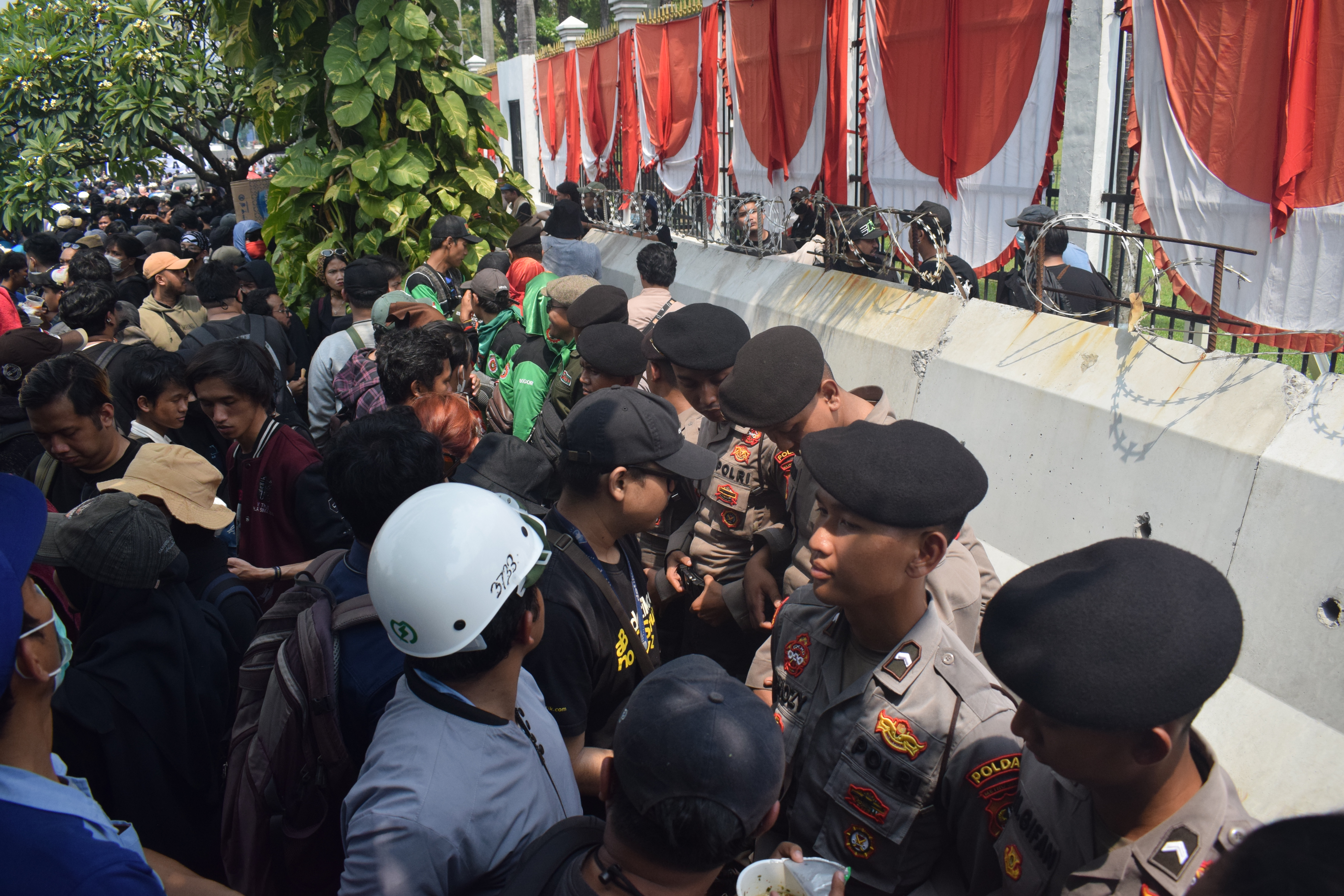
Workers and students directly confronts the police at the perimeter of the DPR Building

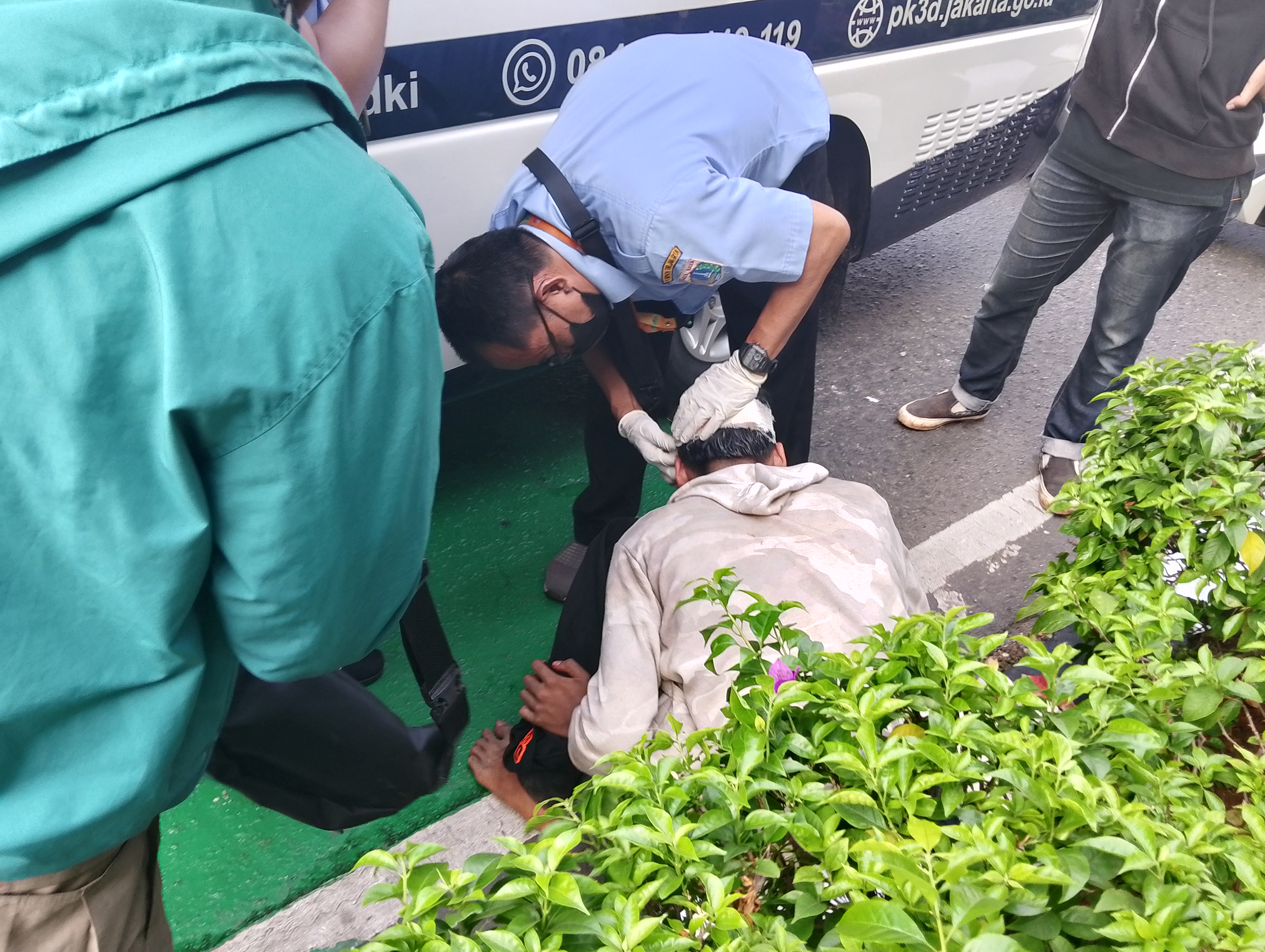
An injured protestor getting checked by medical personnel

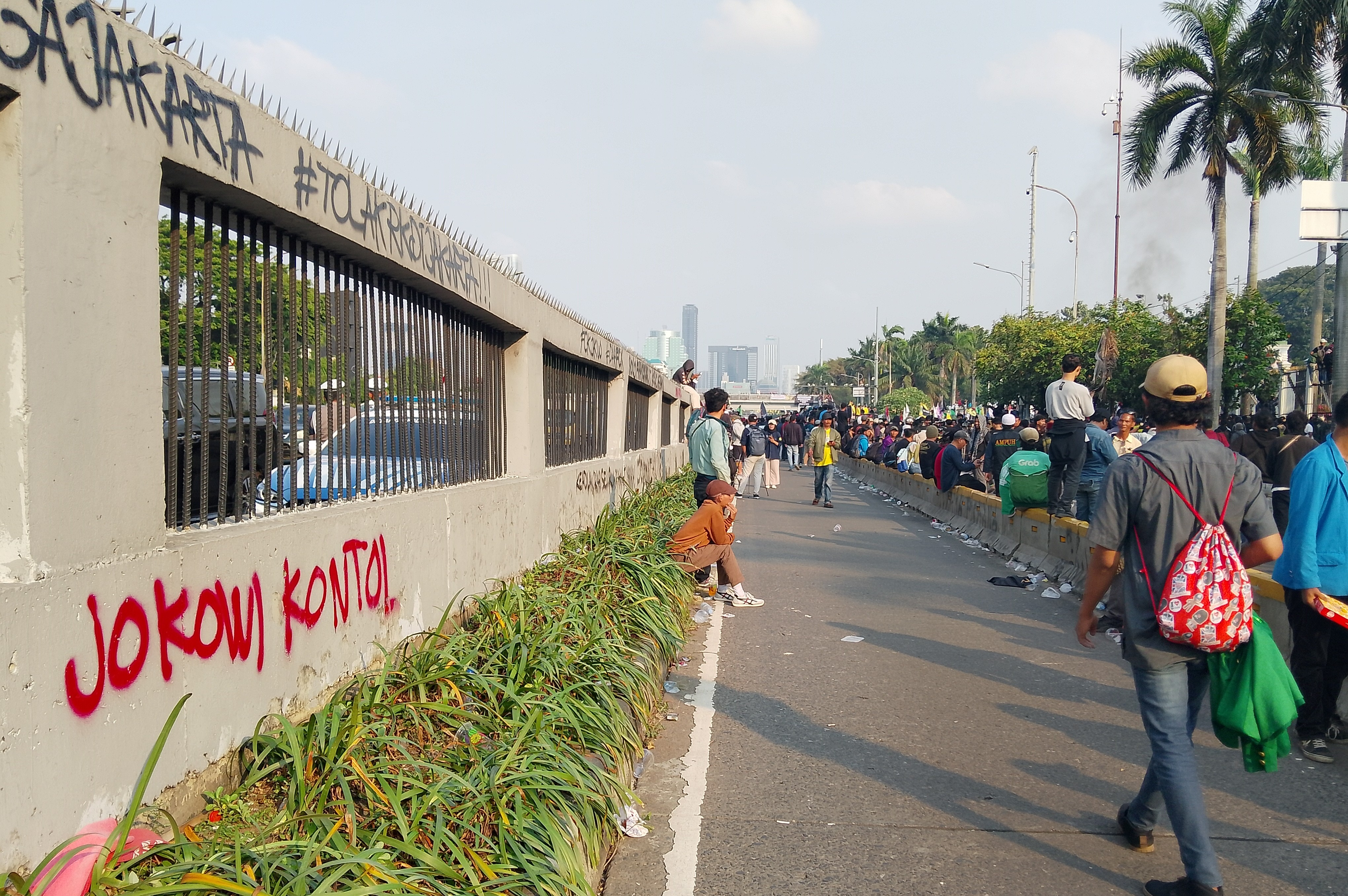
Graffiti on crowd control barriers to the JIRR tollway.

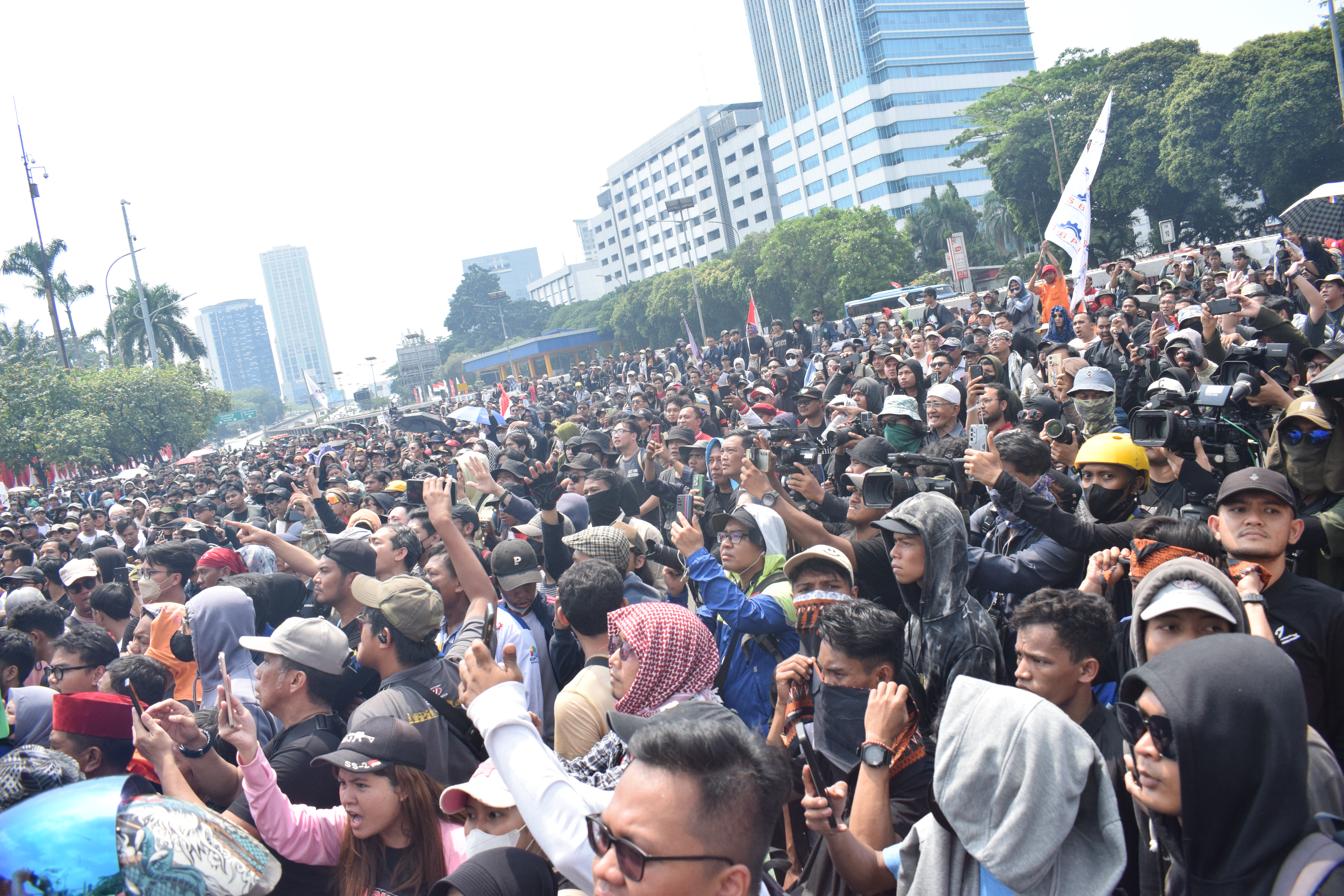
Situation in front of the DPR gates at 12:52 PM

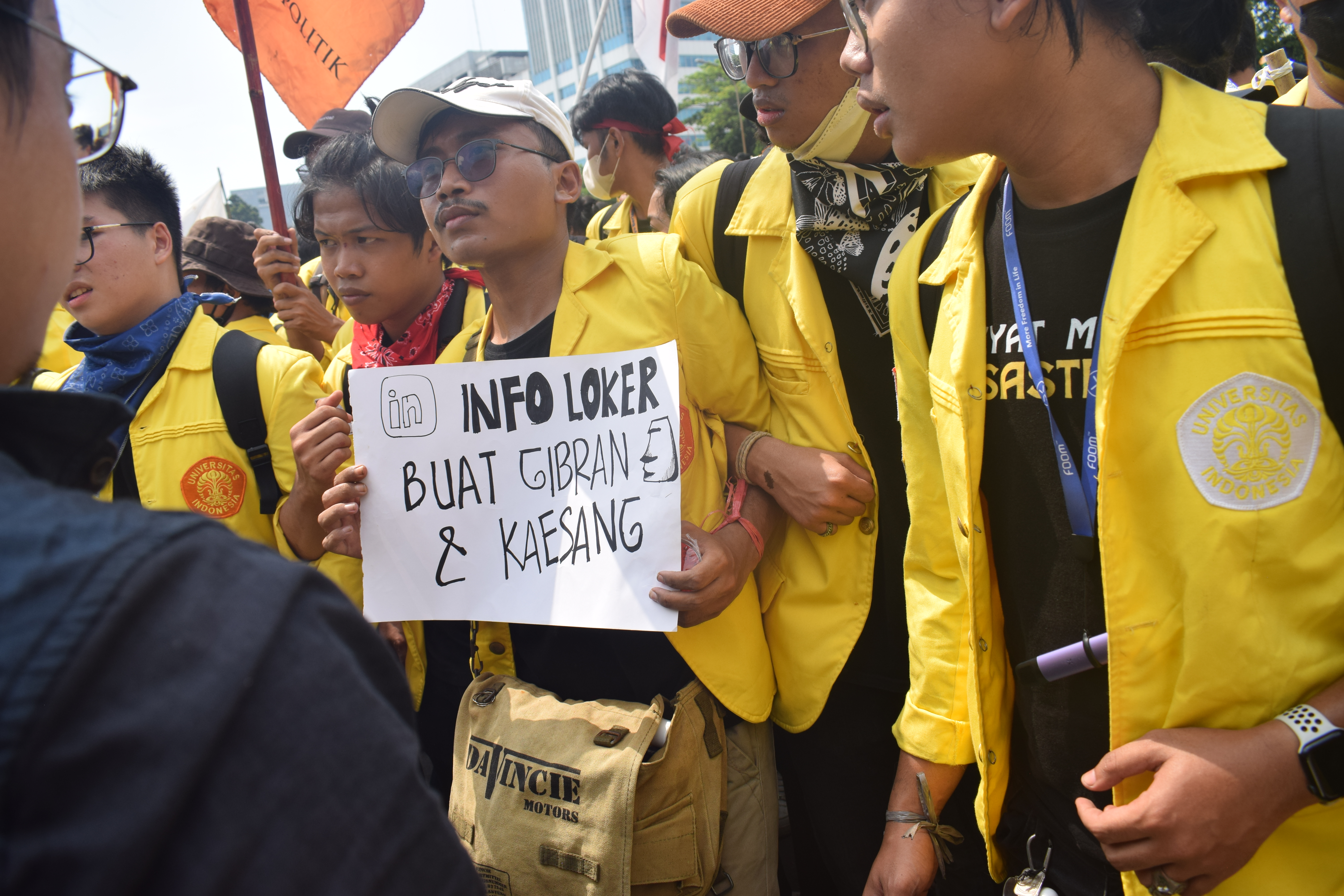
University of Indonesia student holds a sign that reads, 'Info Loker for Gibran & Kaesang,' referencing the ease with which the two secured their positions.

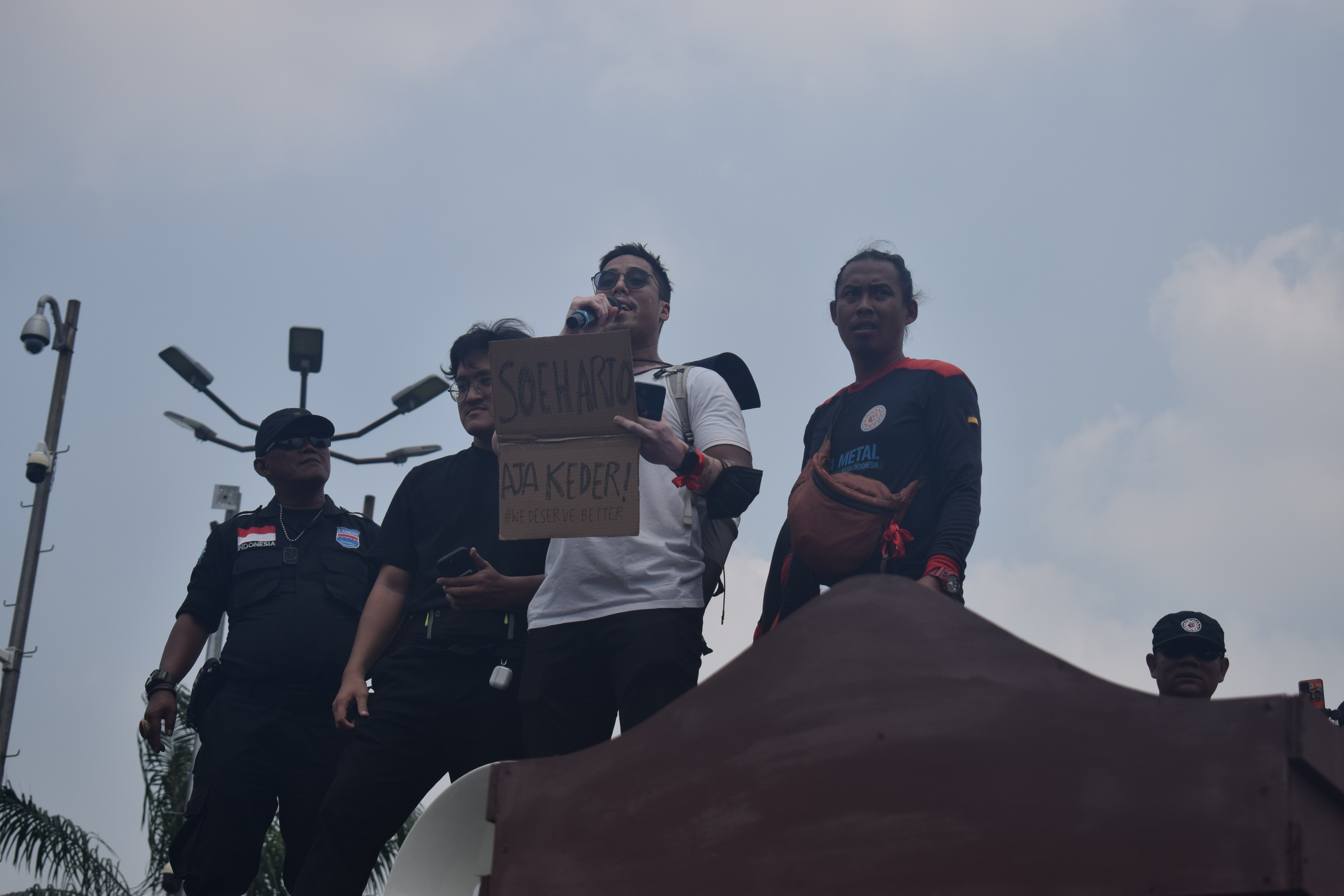
A middle-class worker calling for the office workers of SCBD to protest together. He holds the sign, "Even Soeharto got scared! #WeDeserveBetter"

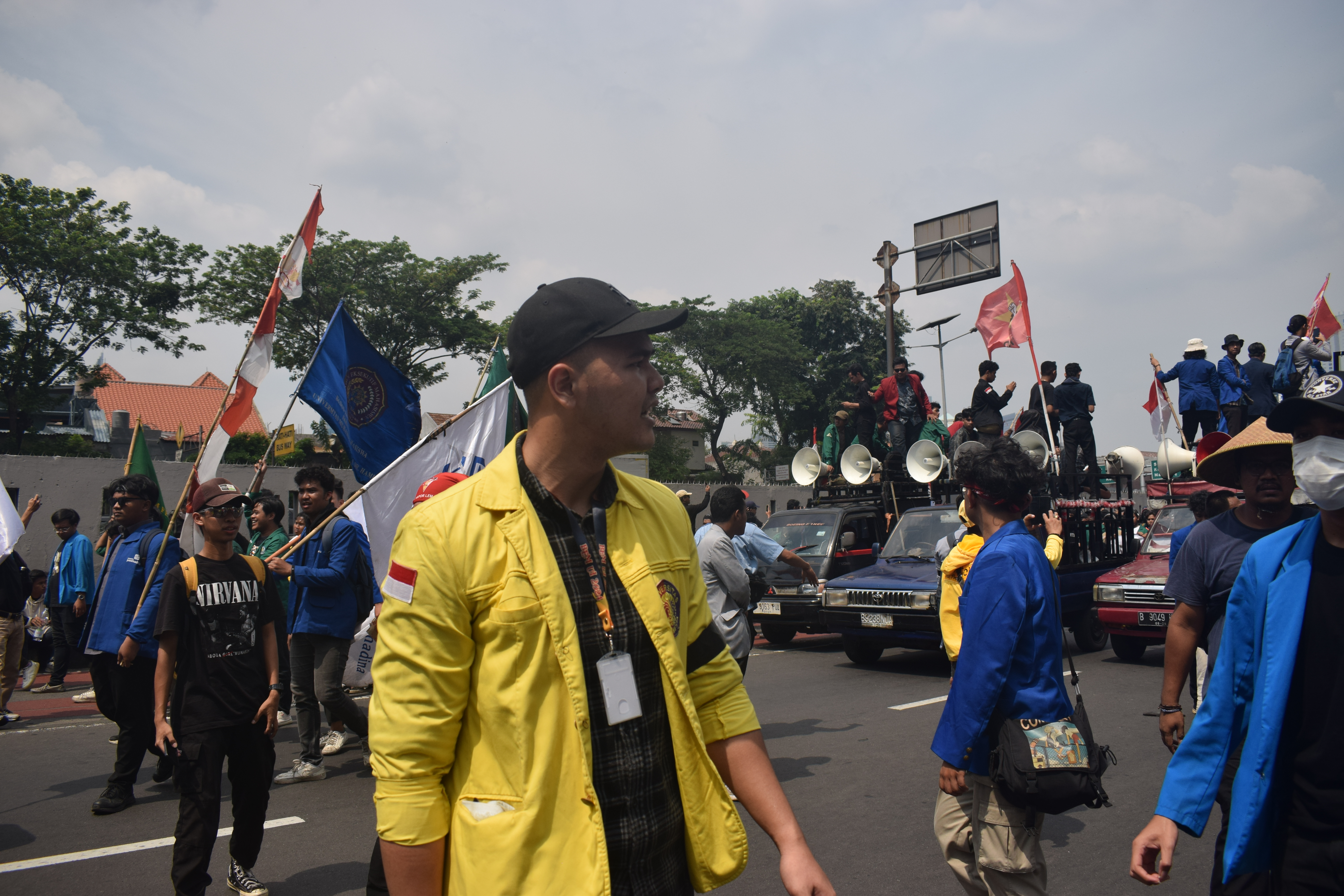
Head of BEM UI, Verrel Uziel, coordinating with other university students. Later becoming viral for his speeches.

=== In Medan ===
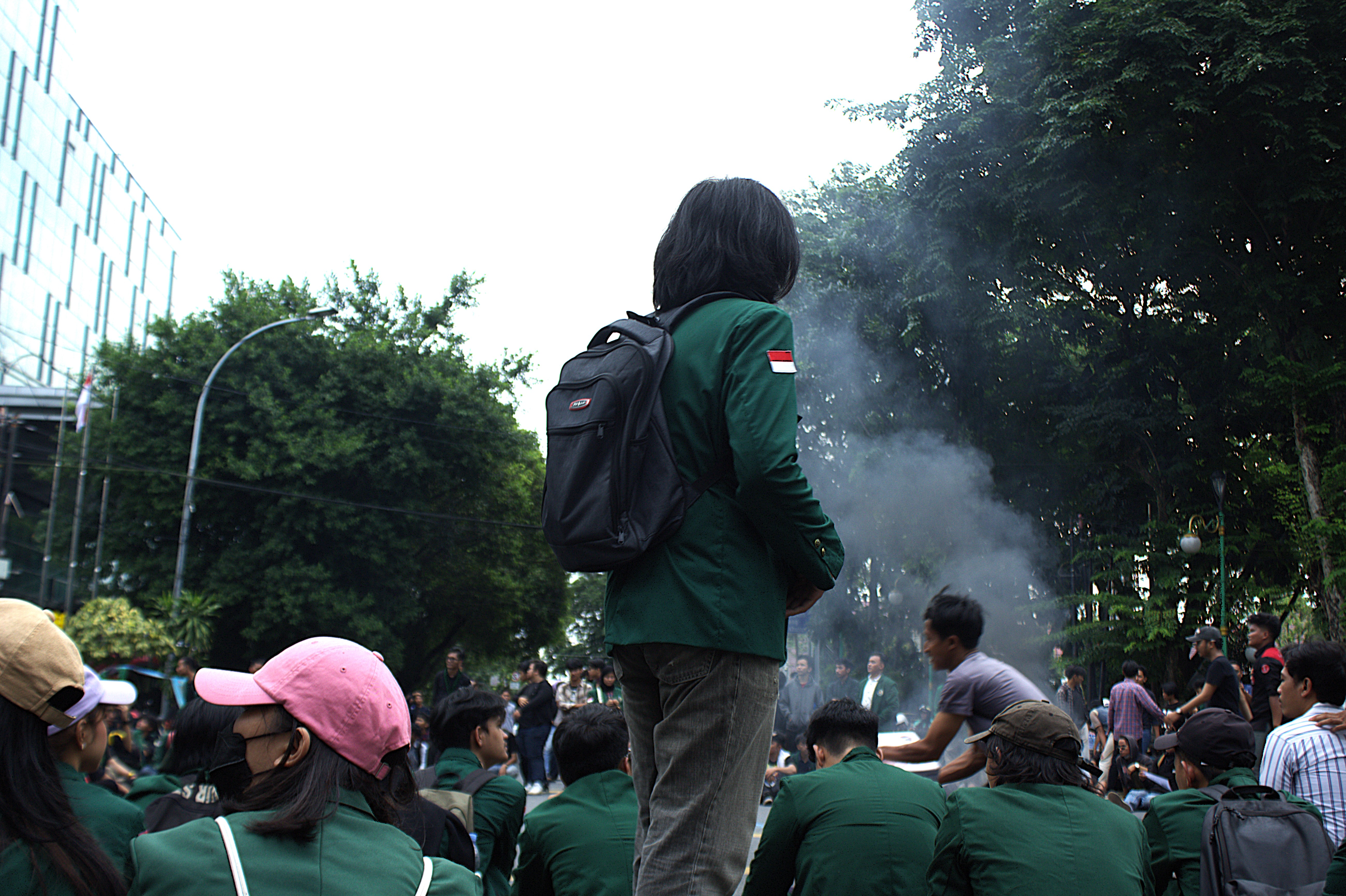
A protestor stands in the middle of a sit in protest in Medan

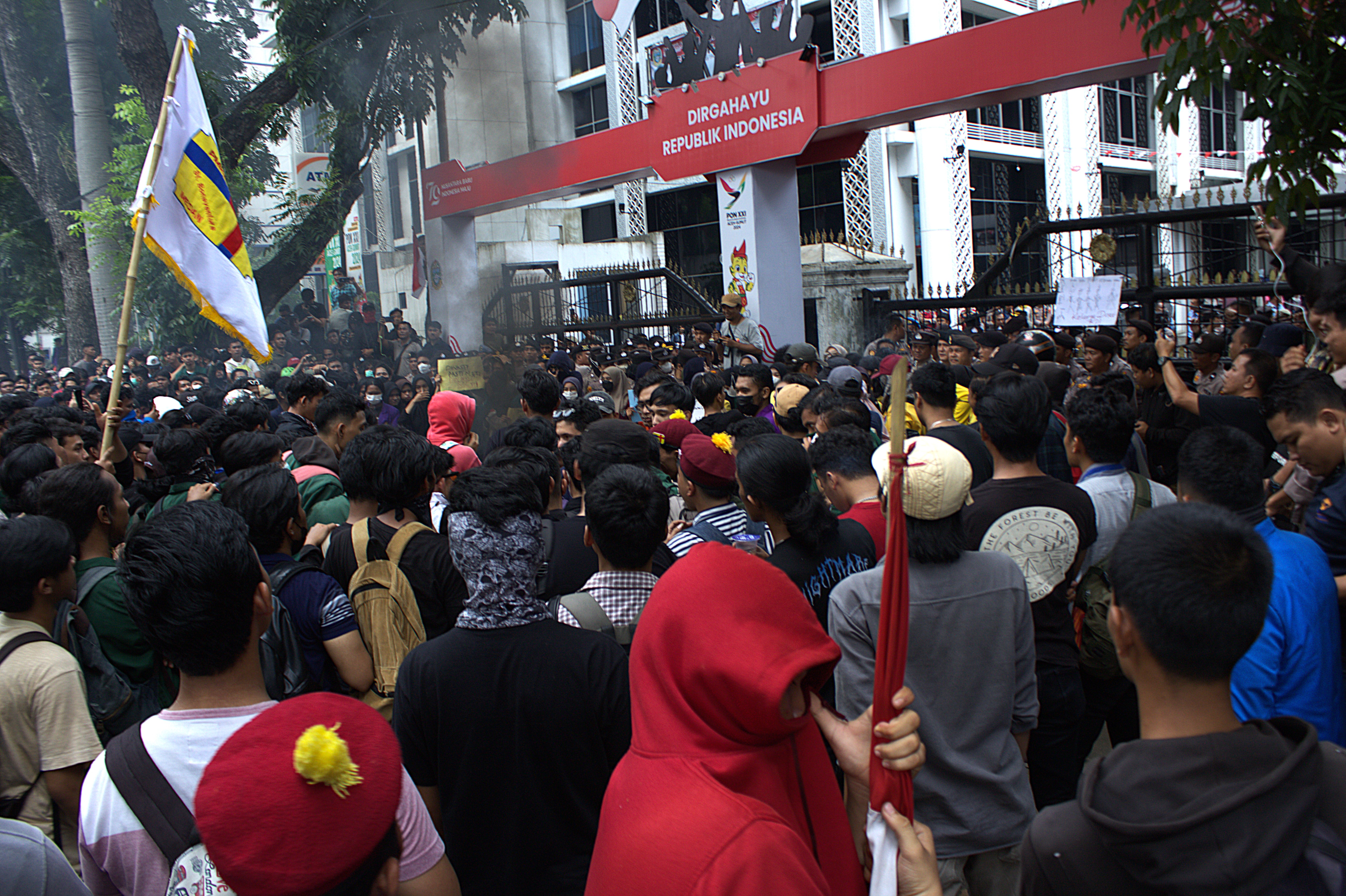
Protestors blockade the front gate of the North Sumatra DPRD Building

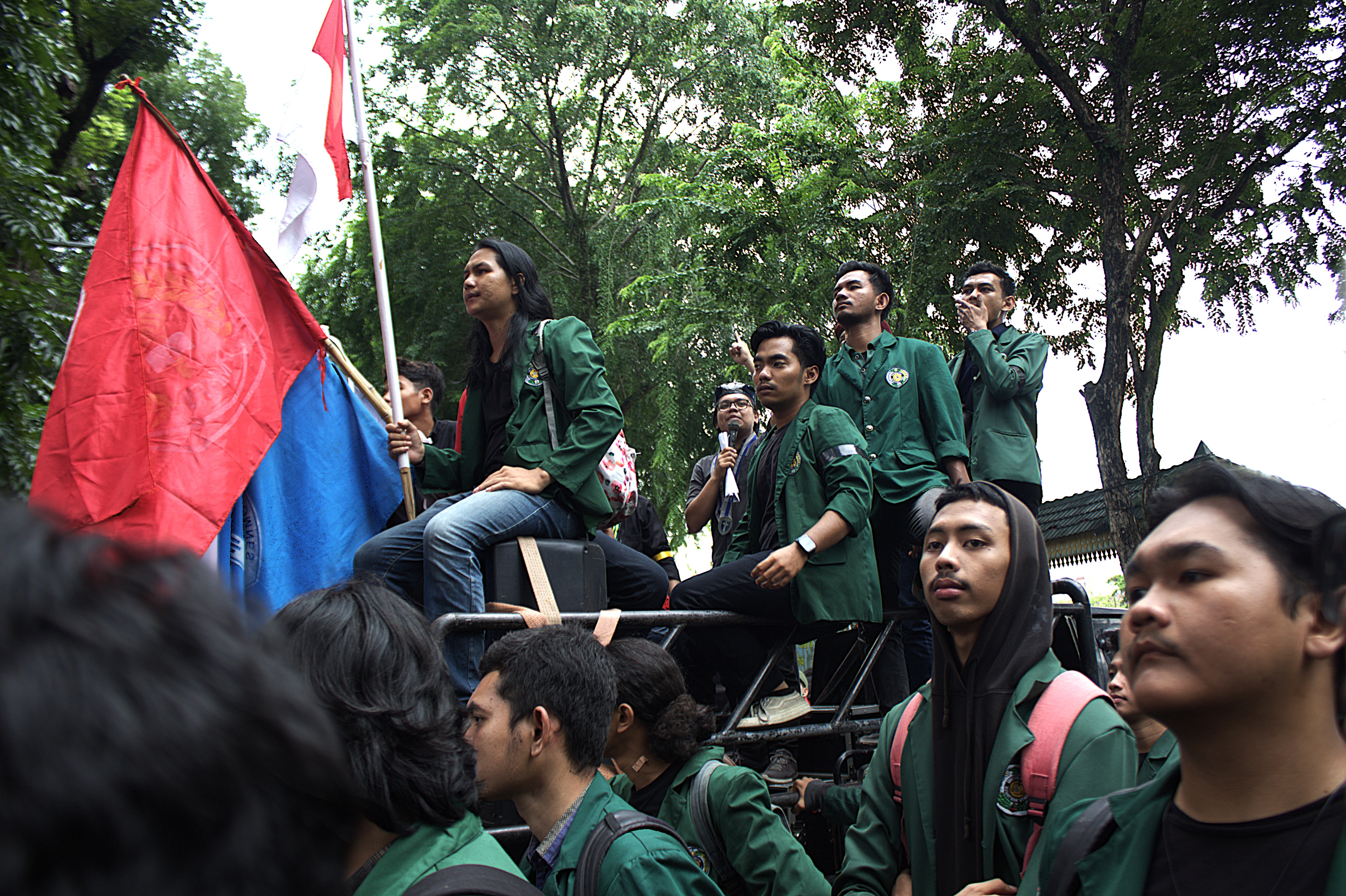
Students from the University of North Sumatra waiting patiently in a sit-in protest

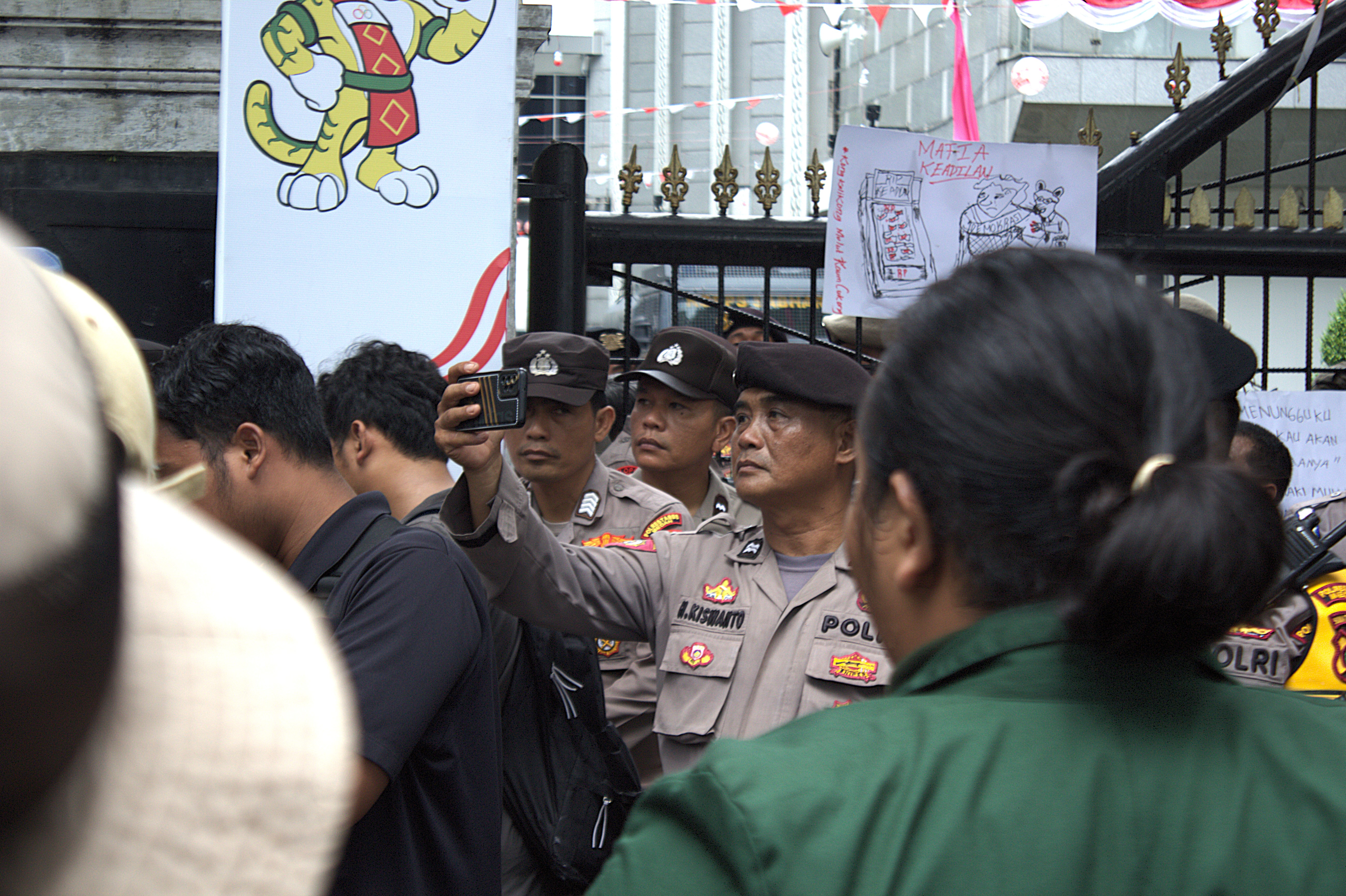
A Medan Police officer taking a picture during protests

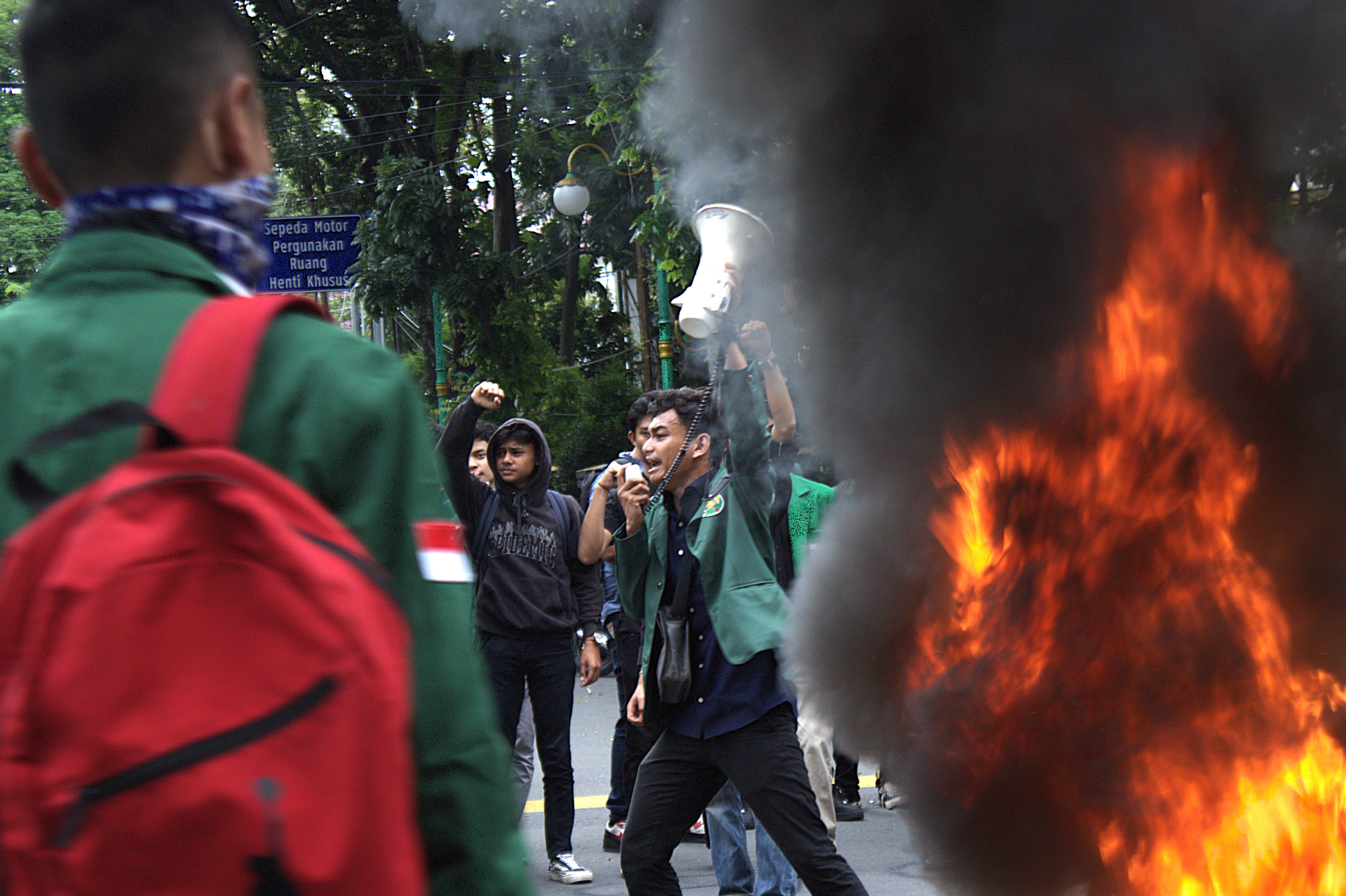
A university students speaks his aspirations through a megaphone

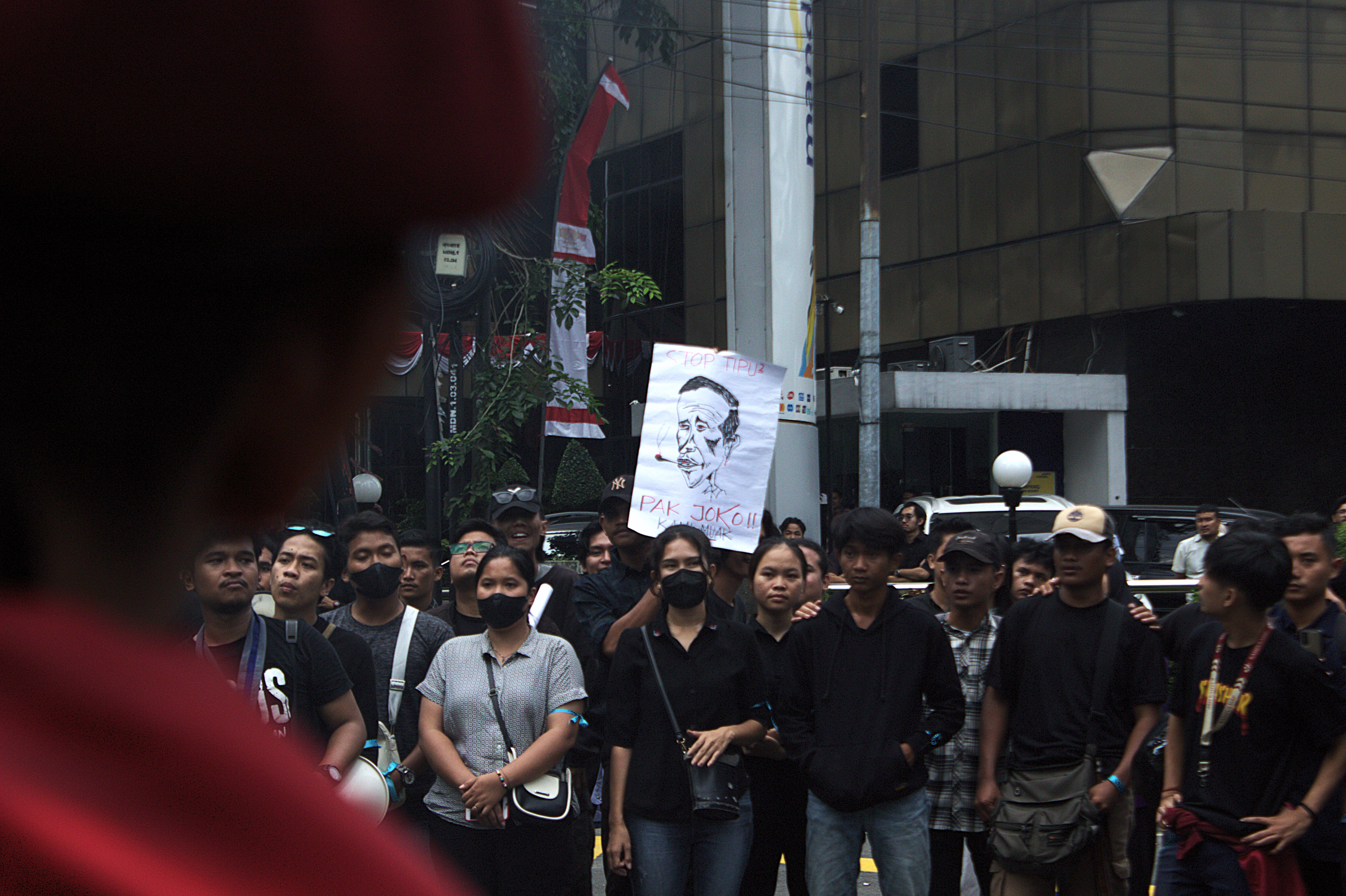
Activists clad in black in Medan

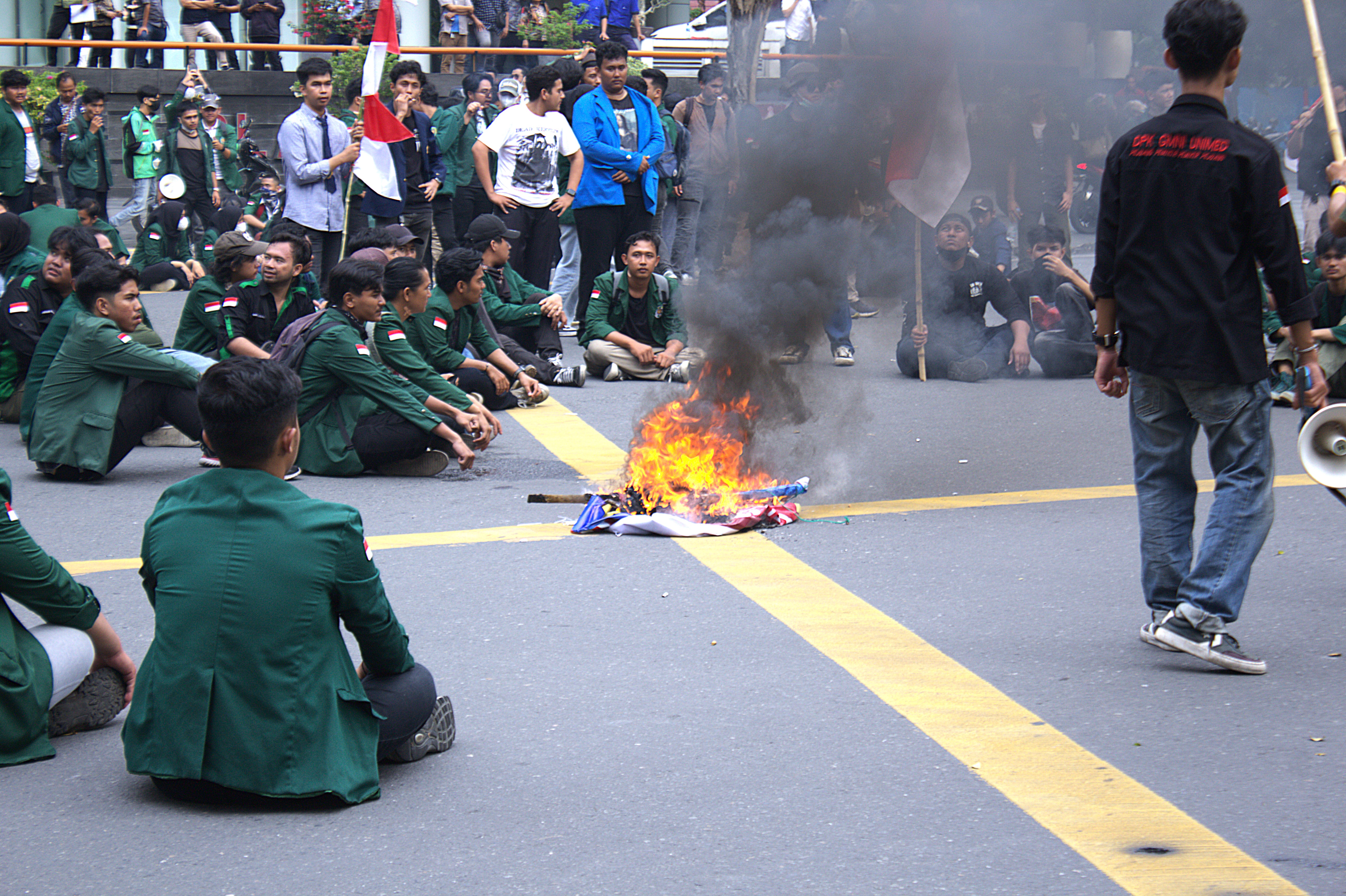
Students gather around a makeshift fire in the middle of an intersection near the North Sumatra DPRD

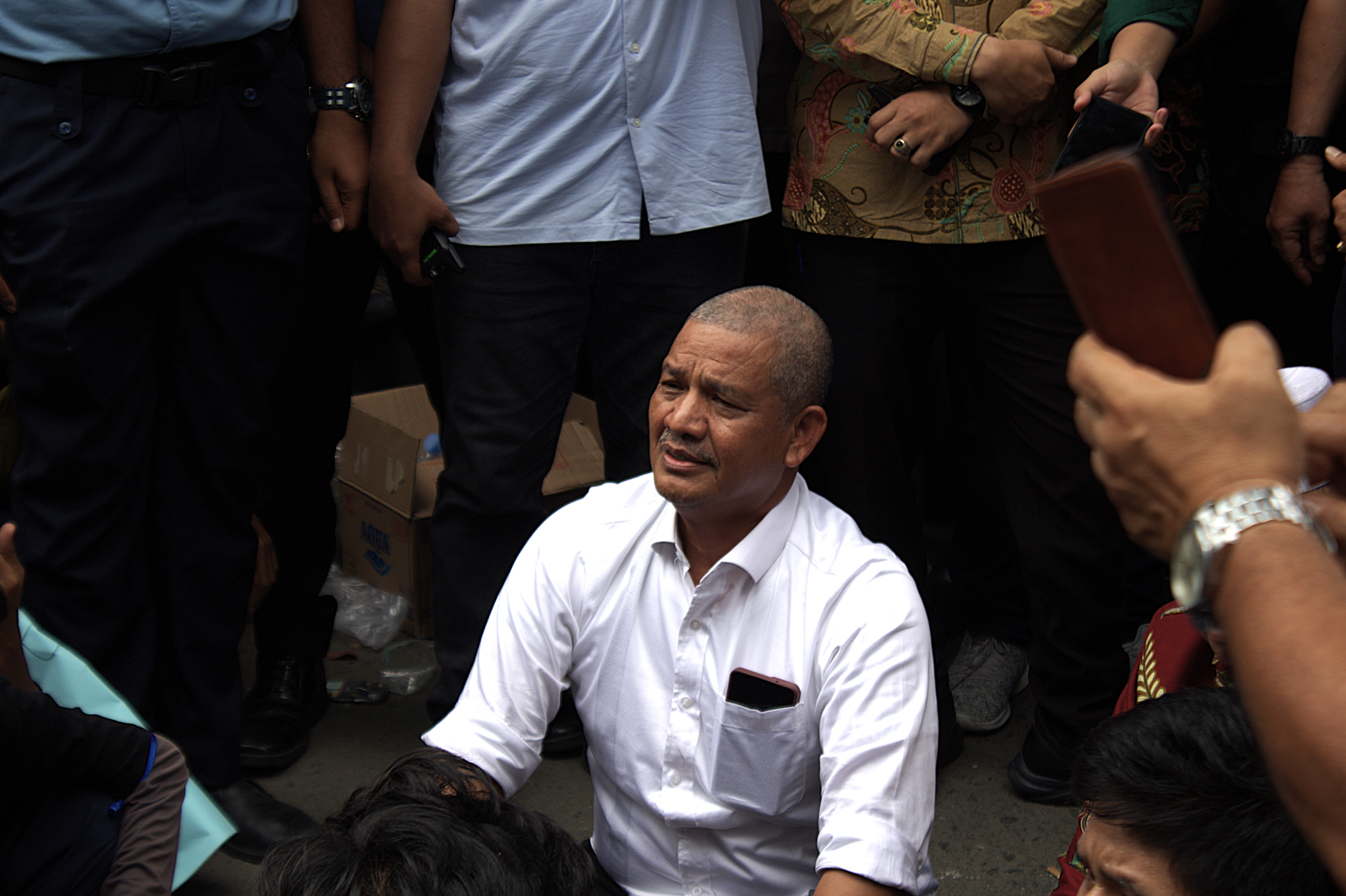
Chairman of the North Sumatra DPRD, Sutarto, also joined in the sit-in protest

== See also ==
Student protests in Indonesia

- May 1998 riots of Indonesia – Period of civil unrest, anti-government protests, and racial violence in Indonesia
- 2019 Indonesian protests and riots – Another nation-wide, students-led protests during Jokowi's presidency
- Indonesia omnibus law protests
- 2022 Indonesian student protests – Protests against rumors of the delay of 2024 elections
- 2025 Indonesian protests – Protests against controversial policies by the government

Other protests

- 2022–2024 Bangladesh protests - Series of protests against the government of Sheikh Hasina
  - 2024 Bangladesh quota reform movement – Protest against a supreme court ruling in Bangladesh
  - 2024 Non-cooperation movement
- Milk Tea Alliance – Pro-democracy movement in Asia
  - 2019–2020 Hong Kong protests – Similar pro-democracy protest against a proposed bill
  - 2020–2021 Thai protests
  - 2021–2022 Myanmar protests
