= Erina Gudono =

Indonesian model

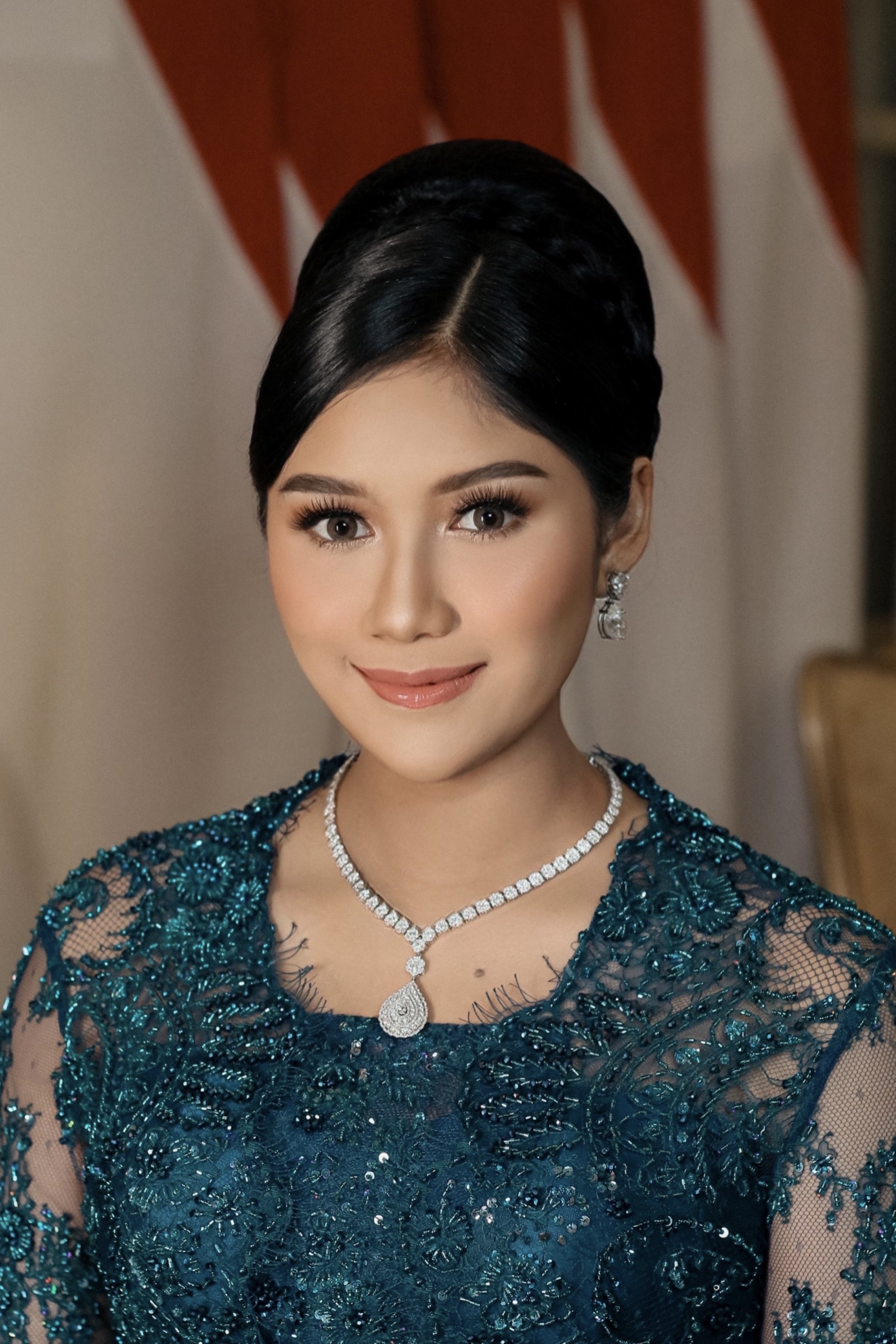
- Born: Erina Sofia Gudono; 11 December 1996 (age 29); Philadelphia, Pennsylvania, United States
- Education: Gadjah Mada University
- Occupations: Model; artist; presenter; financial analyst
- Years active: 2019–present
- Title: Puteri Indonesia D.I. Yogyakarta 2022
- Spouse: Kaesang Pangarep (m. 2022)
- Children: 1
- Parents: Mohammad Gudono (father); Sofiatun Gudono (mother)
- Family: Family of Joko Widodo
- Beauty pageant titleholder
- Hair color: Black
- Eye color: Dark brown
- Major competitions: Puteri Indonesia D.I. Yogyakarta 2022 (Won); Puteri Indonesia 2022 (Top 11)

Erina Sofia Gudono (born 11 December 1996) is an Indonesian model and beauty pageant titleholder who was crowned Puteri Indonesia Yogyakarta Special Region 2022. She represented the Yogyakarta Special Region province in Puteri Indonesia 2022, where she achieved the Top 11 position. She is married to Kaesang Pangarep, the youngest son of Indonesian seventh president Joko Widodo.

== Education ==
She studied at SMA 3 Yogyakarta, and at Gadjah Mada University, majoring in economics.

== Career ==
Gudono started her career as an Assistant Manager Apprenticeship Project at the Payment System Policy Department at Bank Indonesia. She then worked at JP Morgan as a Finance Analyst. Later, she was appointed as an Associate Brand Strategist at Tokopedia from April 2019 to October 2020.

== Beauty contest ==
=== Puteri Indonesia Special Region of Yogyakarta 2022 ===
In 2022, at the age of 25, Erina won the 2021-2022 Puteri Indonesia Special Region of Yogyakarta competition which was held at the Ballroom of the Sheraton Mustika Hotel Yogyakarta Resort & Spa on Tuesday, 14 December 2021. In this contest, she managed to win by defeating Shania Binti Mahir Hamdun, who obtained the position of 1st Runner-up.

=== Puteri Indonesia 2022 ===
Due to her victory at the Puteri Indonesia DI Yogyakarta 2022 competition, she has the right to represent the province of Special Region of Yogyakarta at the Puteri Indonesia 2022, which was held on 27 May 2022 at the Jakarta Convention Center, Jakarta. In the national contest, she was ranked 11 out of 45 participants from all provincial representatives in Indonesia.

== Achievements ==
Erina is a delegate of the 2022 Harvard World Model United Nations. Apart from that, she won the Business Project Competition in Tokyo, 1st place in the National Business Plan Competition, and 1st place in the AIESEC Social Initiative Competition.

Erina received the Most Social Spirited Scholar scholarship in the UGM FEB Award activities. Erina is a polyglot who is fluent in Javanese, Indonesian, English, Japanese, and French. Erina can write Javanese script.

Erina is known to be active at the Yogyakarta Marginal School. She has run social programs, such as the ABC Package, literacy and numeracy (calistung) classes, book donations, and entrepreneurship training for women. She is involved in volunteer activities at the Story of Love Organization to help MSMEs affected by the COVID-19 pandemic. Erina was then asked to become an education developer in Biak, Papua.

== Personal life ==
Erina is married to Kaesang Pangarep, who is the youngest son of Joko Widodo and makes her the younger daughter-in-law in the Joko Widodo family. Erina and Kaesang officially held their wedding ceremony and reception on 10 December 2022 at Pendopo Agung Ambarrukmo, Yogyakarta. Their first child, a daughter named Bebingah Sang Tansahayu, was born on 15 October 2024.

== Television ==
Year	Show	TV stations	Notes
2022	Puteri Indonesia 2022	SCTV	As a contestant
2023	masakINDOng	iNews	As a host

== Controversies ==
=== Private jet ===
In August 2024, Erina faced significant public scrutiny on social media for using private jet while going to United States, which being discovered by chance on social media, after someone had a simple inquiry regarding cabin window from her post on social media. Erina private jet usage were coincided with a period of widespread Indonesian local election law protests against the House of Representatives attempt to amend the regional law election in August 2024. BBC reported that the amend is an effort to find a way around existing Constitutional Court of Indonesia court decision (Note: Constitutional Court of Indonesia decision about rejection of petition No. 70/PUU-XXII/2024) to uphold the current minimum age limit of 30-year-old for candidates, which pivotal for her husband candidacy in 2024 Central Java gubernatorial election.

This public scrutiny made Erina in the public spotlight for her social media posts that are said to show off a luxurious lifestyle, with netizens called her behavior like Marie Antoinette. Prior to her US trip, Erina announced that she had received a scholarship to study social policy at the University of Pennsylvania. The private jet is known to be Gulfstream G650ER type with tail number N588SE, FAA registration shows that airplane belongs to Garena, a holding company that in the past few years already have relationship with her husband and her brother-in-law, Gibran Rakabuming Raka in various development projects in Surakarta.

Her husband then was reported to the Corruption Eradication Commission (KPK) by Indonesian Anti-Corruption Society (MAKI). On 17 September 2024, her husband visited KPK, and told the media that he and Erina was hitching their friend on the jet.

Erina's August 2024 is not the only trip, another video from the past were circulated where she and Kaesang went directly to a car after getting off from same N588SE private jet while bringing numerous shopping bags without going through proper airports customs procedure.

== Notes ==
Awards and achievements
Preceded by Ervina Nathasia	Puteri Indonesia DI Yogyakarta; 2022	Succeeded by Dinda Nur Safira; Bianca Havika Aidi
