= Endorsements in the 2024 Indonesian presidential election =

This page is a non-exhaustive list of notable individuals and organisations who endorsed individual candidates for the 2024 Indonesian presidential election. Politicians are noted with their party origin or political affiliation should they come from parties not part of the candidate's coalition. Celebrities are noted with their party origin should they have one.

== Endorsements for Anies Baswedan ==
=== Central government ===
==== Presidents and vice presidents ====
- Jusuf Kalla, Vice President of Indonesia (2004–2009, 2014–2019), Chairman of the Indonesian Red Cross Society (2009–present), Leader of Golkar (2004–2009), Coordinating Minister for People's Welfare of Indonesia (2001–2004), Minister of Industry and Trade of Indonesia (1999–2000)

==== Cabinet-level officers ====
- Malam Sambat Kaban, Minister of Forestry (2004–2009), Member of People's Representative Council (1999–2004), Chairman of Crescent Star Party (2005–2015)
- Helmy Faishal Zaini, Minister of Villages, Development of Disadvantaged Regions, and Transmigration (2009–2014), Member of People's Representative Council (2004–2009, 2014–2019, 2019–present), Secretary General of the Executive Council of Nahdlatul Ulama (2015–2021)
- Abdul Halim Iskandar, Minister of Villages, Development of Disadvantaged Regions, and Transmigration (2019–present), Speaker of the East Java Regional People's Representative Council (2014–2019)
- Ida Fauziyah, Minister of Manpower (2019–present), Member of People's Representative Council (1999–2004, 2004–2009, 2009–2014, 2014–2018)
- Fachrul Razi, Minister of Religious Affairs (2019–2020), retired general of Indonesian Army
- Sudirman Said, Minister of Energy and Mineral Resources (2014–2016)
- Muhammad Hanif Dhakiri, Minister of Manpower (2014–2019), Acting Minister of Youth and Sports (2019), Member of People's Representative Council (2009–2014)
- Susi Pudjiastuti, Minister of Maritime Affairs and Fisheries of Indonesia (2014–2019)
- Thomas Lembong, Head of Investment Coordinating Board (2016–2019), Minister of Trade of Indonesia (2015–2016)
- Nur Mahmudi Ismail, Minister Forestry (1999–2001), Mayor of Depok (2006–2011, 2011–2016), President of Prosperous Justice Party (1999–2000), Member of People's Representative Council (1999)
- Suswono, Minister of Agriculture (2009–2014), Member of People's Representative Council (2004–2009)
- Suharna Surapranata, Minister for Research and Technology (2009–2011), Member of People's Representative Council (2009)
- Salim Segaf Al-Jufri, Minister of Social Affairs (2009–2014), Indonesian Ambassador to Saudi Arabia (2005–2009)
- Bachtiar Chamsyah, Minister of Social Affairs (2001–2004, 2004–2009)
- Ryaas Rasyid, Minister of State Apparatus Utilization (2000–2001), State Minister for Regional Autonomy (1999–2000), Member of Presidential Advisory Council (2010–2014)
- Hayono Isman, State Minister of Youth and Sports (1993–1998), Member of People's Representative Council (1987–1993, 2009–2014)
- Surya Tjandra, Deputy Minister of Agrarian Affairs and Spatial Planning (2019–2022)
- Fasli Jalal, Deputy Minister of National Education (2010–2011), Rector of YARSI University (2019–present)

==== Members of national parliament ====
- Surya Paloh, Member of People's Consultative Assembly (1977–1987), Leader of NasDem Party (2013–present), President Director of Metro TV (2000–2006)
- Amien Rais, Speaker of the People's Consultative Assembly (1999–2004), Chairman of Muhammadiyah (1995–1998)
- Hidayat Nur Wahid, Deputy Speaker of the People's Consultative Assembly (2014–present), Speaker of the People's Consultative Assembly (2004–2009), President of Prosperous Justice Party (2000–2004)
- Sohibul Iman, Deputy Speaker of the People's Representative Council (2013–2014), President of Prosperous Justice Party (2015–2020), Member of People's Representative Council (2009–2014, 2014–2017)
- Rachmad Gobel, Third Deputy Speaker of the People's Representative Council (2019–present), Minister of Trade of Indonesia (2014–2015), Member of National Committee on Innovation (2010–2014)
- Tifatul Sembiring, Member of People's Representative Council (2009, 2014–2019, 2019–present), Minister of Communications and Informatics (2009–2014), President of Prosperous Justice Party (2004–2009)
- Ahmad Syaikhu, Member of People's Representative Council (2019–present), President of Prosperous Justice Party (2020–present), Vice Mayor of Bekasi (2013–2018), Member of West Java Regional House of Representatives (2009–2013)
- Lestari Moerdijat, Deputy Speaker of the People's Consultative Assembly of Indonesia (2019–present)
- Tamsil Linrung, Member of Regional Representative Council (2019–present), Member of People's Representative Council (2004–2009, 2009–2014, 2014–2019)
- Jazilul Fawaid, Deputy Speaker of the People's Consultative Assembly of Indonesia (2019–present), Member of People's Representative Council (2013–2014, 2014–2019, 2019–present)
- Aboe Bakar Al-Habsyi, Member of People's Representative Council (2004–2009, 2009–2014, 2014–2019, 2019–present)
- Dimyati Natakusumah, Member of People's Representative Council (2009–2014, 2014–2018), Deputy Speaker of People's Consultative Assembly (2014), Regent of Pandeglang
- Jazuli Juwaini, Member of People's Representative Council (2004–2009, 2009–2014, 2014–2019, 2019–present)
- Al Muzzammil Yusuf, Member of People's Representative Council (2004–2009, 2009–2014, 2014–2019, 2019–present)
- Adang Daradjatun, Member of People's Representative Council (2009–2014, 2014–2019, 2019–present), Deputy Chief of Indonesian National Police (2004–2006)
- Mardani Ali Sera, Member of People's Representative Council (2011–2014, 2017–2019, 2019–present)
- Nihayatul Wafiroh, Member of People's Representative Council (2014–2019, 2019–present)
- Ahmad Sahroni, Member of People's Representative Council (2014–2019, 2019–present)
- Rafly Kande, Member of People's Representative Council (2019–present), Member of Regional Representative Council (2014–2019)
- Irmawan, Member of People's Representative Council (2014–2019, 2019–present)
- Muhammad Nasir Djamil, Member of People's Representative Council (2004–2009, 2009–2014, 2014–2019, 2019–present)
- Prananda Surya Paloh, Member of People's Representative Council (2014–2019, 2019–present)
- Mustafa Kamal, Member of People's Representative Council (2004–2009, 2009–2014, 2014–2019, 2019–present)
- Ansory Siregar, Member of People's Representative Council (2004–2009, 2009–2014, 2014–2019, 2019–present)
- Iskan Qolba Lubis, Member of People's Representative Council (2009–2014, 2014–2019, 2019–present)
- Mahfudz Abdurrahman, Member of People's Representative Council (2009–2014, 2014–2019, 2019–present)
- Sugeng Suparwoto, Member of People's Representative Council (2019–present)
- Syaiful Huda, Member of People's Representative Council (2019–present)
- Willy Aditya, Member of People's Representative Council (2019–present)
- Dossy Iskandar, Member of People's Representative Council (2014–2019)
- Lukmanul Khakim, Member of People's Representative Council (2014–2019)
- Ahmad Ali, Member of the People's Representative Council (2014–2019, 2019–present)
- Martin Manurung, Member of the People's Representative Council (2019–present)
- Hasanuddin Wahid, Member of the People's Representative Council (2020–present), Secretary General of National Awakening Party (2019–present)
- Sugeng Suparwoto, Member of the People's Representative Council (2019–present)
- Syaiful Huda, Member of the People's Representative Council (2019–present)
- Fahira Idris, Member of Regional Representative Council (2014–2019, 2019–present)
- Taufiq R. Abdullah, Member of the People's Representative Council (2014–2019, 2019–present)
- Faisol Riza, Member of the People's Representative Council (2019–present)
- Anggia Ermarini, Member of the People's Representative Council (2019–present), General Chairwoman of Fatayat Nahdlatul Ulama (2015–2022)
- Fathan Subchi, Member of the People's Representative Council (2014–2019, 2019–present)
- Taufik Basari, Member of the People's Representative Council (2019–present)
- Charles Meikyansah, Member of the People's Representative Council (2019–present)
- Okky Asokawati, Member of the People's Representative Council (2009–2014, 2014–2018)
- Syarief Abdullah Alkadrie, Member of the People's Representative Council (2014–2019, 2019–present)

==== Independent agencies ====
- Abdullah Hehamahua, Adviser of Corruption Eradication Commission (2005–2009, 2009–2013)
- Abraham Samad, Chairman of Corruption Eradication Commission (2011–2015)
- Bambang Widjojanto, Vice Chairman of the Corruption Eradication Commission (2011–2015)
- Hamdan Zoelva, Chief Justice of the Constitutional Court (2013–2015), Deputy Chief Justice of the Constitutional Court (2013), Member of the People's Representative Council (1999–2004)
- Jan Darmadi, Member of Presidential Advisory Council (2015–2019)
- Jumhur Hidayat, Head of National Agency of Placement and Protection of Indonesian Overseas Workers (2007–2014)
- Muhammad Prasetyo, Attorney General of Indonesia (2014–2019), Member of the People's Representative Council (2014)
- Sigit Pramono, President Director of Bank Negara Indonesia (2003–2008)
- Soetrisno Bachir, Chairman of National Industry and Economic Committee (2016–2020), Chairman of National Mandate Party (2005–2010)
- Sutiyoso, Director of the State Intelligence Agency (2015–2016), Governor of Jakarta (1997–2007), retired lieutenant general of the Indonesian Army (1968–1996)
- Syamsir Siregar, Director of the State Intelligence Agency (2004–2009), retired major general of the Indonesian Army (1965–1996)
- Thony Saut Situmorang, Vice Chairman of the Corruption Eradication Commission (2015–2019)

=== Provincial government ===
==== Governors and vice governors ====
- Ahmad Heryawan, Governor of West Java (2008–2018), Deputy Speaker of Jakarta Regional House of Representatives (2004–2008)
- Edy Rahmayadi, Governor of North Sumatra (2018–2023), Commander of Army Strategic Command (2015–2018), Chair of the Football Association of Indonesia (2016–2019)
- Irwan Prayitno, Governor of West Sumatra (2010–2015, 2016–2021), Member of People's Representative Council (1999–2004, 2004–2009, 2009–2010)
- Mahyeldi Ansharullah, Governor of West Sumatra (2021–present), Mayor of Padang (2014–2021)
- Wahidin Halim, Governor of Banten (2017–2022), Mayor of Tangerang (2003–2013), Member of People's Representative Council (2014–2016)
- Herman Deru, Governor of South Sumatra (2018–2023), Regent of East Ogan Komering Ulu (2005–2010, 2010–2015), Adviser of Nahdlatul Ulama (2022–present)
- Dominggus Mandacan, Governor of West Papua (2017–2022), Regent of Arfak Mountains Regency (2013–2015), Regent of Manokwari Regency (2000–2005, 2005–2010)
- Anwar Adnan Saleh, Governor of West Sulawesi (2006–2011, 2011–2016)
- Irianto Lambrie, Governor of North Kalimantan (2013–2015, 2016–2021), Regional Secretary of East Kalimantan (2008–2013)
- Syahrial Oesman, Governor of South Sumatra (2003–2008), Regent of Ogam Komering Ulu (2000–2003)
- Ali Mazi, Governor of Southeast Sulawesi (2003–2008, 2018–2023)
- Zulkieflimansyah, Governor of West Nusa Tenggara (2018–2023), Member of People's Representative Council (2004–2018)
- Ma'mun Amir, Vice Governor of Central Sulawesi (2021–present), Regent of Banggai Regency (2006–2011)
- Muhammad Nazar, Vice Governor of Aceh (2007–2012), Chairman of SIRA Party (2017–2022)
- Said Ismail, Vice Governor of Central Kalimantan (2016–2021), Member of Regional Representative Council (2014–2015), Member of Central Kalimantan Regional House of Representatives (2009–2014)
- Chusnunia Chalim, Vice Governor of Lampung (2019–2023), Regent of East Lampung (2016–2019), Member of People's Representative Council (2009–2014, 2014–2015)
- Abdullah Sani, Vice Governor of Jambi (2021–present), Vice Mayor of Jambi City (2013–2018)
- Marlin Agustina, Vice Governor of Riau Islands (2021–present)

==== Members of provincial parliament ====
- Nilam Sari Lawira, Speaker of Central Sulawesi Regional House of Representatives (2019–present)
- Achmad Ru'yat, Deputy Speaker of West Java Regional House of Representatives (2004–2009, 2019–present), Mayor of Bogor (2009–2014)
- Khoirudin, Deputy Speaker of Jakarta Regional House of Representatives (2022–present), Member of Jakarta Regional House of Representatives (2019–present)
- Abdul Ghoni, Member of Jakarta Regional House of Representatives (2019–2023)
- Aulia Agsa, Member of North Sumatra Regional House of Representatives (2019–present)
- Haru Suandharu, Member of West Java Regional House of Representatives (2019–present)
- Nova Harivan Paloh, Member of Jakarta Regional House of Representatives (2019–present)
- Rahmat Saleh, Member of West Sumatra Regional House of Representatives (2014–2019, 2019–present)
- Wibi Andrino, Member of Jakarta Regional House of Representatives (2019–present)
- Yusra Alhabsyi, Member of North Sulawesi Regional House of Representatives (2019–present)

=== Municipal government ===
==== Mayors and regents ====
- Fauzi Bahar, Mayor of Padang (2004–2014)
- Fadly Amran, Mayor of Padang Panjang (2018–2023)
- Syarif Fasha, Mayor of Jambi (2013–2018, 2018–2023)
- Mohammad Idris, Mayor of Depok (2016–2021, 2021–present)
- Muhammad Rudi, Mayor of Batam (2016–2021, 2021–present), Vice Mayor of Batam (2011–2016)
- Vicky Lumentut, Mayor of Manado (2010–2015, 2016–2021)
- Michael Manufandu, Mayor of Jayapura (1989–1993), Indonesian Ambassador to Colombia (2008–2011)
- Abdul Halim Muslih, Regent of Bantul Regency (2021–present), Vice Regent of Bantul Regency (2016–2021)
- Sukirman, Regent of West Bangka Regency (2021–present), Vice Regent of West Bangka Regency (2010–2015), Member of Bangka Belitung Islands Regional House of Representatives (2019–2020)
- Thoriqul Haq, Regent of Lumajang Regency (2018–present)
- Mathius Awoitauw, Regent of Jayapura Regency (2012–2017, 2017–present)
- Romanus Mbaraka, Regent of Merauke Regency (2011–2016, 2021–present)
- Natalis Tabuni, Regent of Intan Jaya Regency (2012–2017, 2017–present)
- Didimus Yahuli, Regent of Yahukimo Regency (2021–present)
- Rusdi Masse Mappasessu, Regent of Sidenreng Rappang Regency (2008–2018), Member of People's Representative Council (2019–present)
- Suyoto, Regent of Bojonegoro Regency (2008–2018)
- Fatmawati Rusdi, Vice Mayor of Makassar (2021–2023)
- Amsakar Achmad, Vice Mayor of Batam (2016–2021, 2021–present)
- Imam Budi Hartono, Vice Mayor of Depok (2021–present)
- Sanuji Pentamarta, Vice Mayor of Cilegon (2021–present)
- Abdul Mujib Imron, Vice Regent of Pasuruan Regency (2018–present), Member of Regional Representative Council (2004–2009)
- Nasirul Mahasin, ulama, Vice Regent of Rembang Regency (2000–2005)

==== Members of municipal parliament ====
- Afri Rizki Lubis, member of Medan City Regional House of Representatives (2019–present)
- Rudianto Lallo, member of Makassar City Regional House of Representatives (2019–present)
- Sholihin, member of Bekasi City Regional House of Representatives (2019–present)

=== Other politicians ===
- Beni Pramula, activist and writer, Leader of Pelita Party (2022–present)
- Farhat Abbas, lawyer
- Hermawi Taslim, Secretary General of NasDem Party (2023–present)
- Refly Harun, constitutional law expert, lawyer, and political observer
- Thaha Alhamid, Secretary General of Papua Presidium Council
- Yapto Soerjosoemarno, Leader of Pancasila Youth (1981–present)

=== Retired military and police personnel ===
==== Retired Indonesian Army personnel ====
- Agus Kriswanto, Commander of Army Strategic Reserve Command (2018)
- Burhanudin Amin, Commander of Army Strategic Reserve Command (2010)
- I Gusti Kompyang Manila, retired major general of the Indonesian Army (1964–1996)
- Madsuni, Commander of the Armed Forces Education, Training and Doctrine Command (2021), Commandant General of Kopassus (2016–2018), Deputy Commandant General of Kopassus (2016)
- Tyasno Sudarto, Chief of Staff of the Indonesian Army (1999–2000), Head of the Indonesian Strategic Intelligence Agency (1999)

==== Retired Indonesian Air Force personnel ====
- Boy Syahril Qamar, retired air marshal of the Indonesian Air Force (1980–2014)
- Muhammad Syaugi, retired air marshal of the Indonesian Air Force (1984–2018), Head of the National Search and Rescue Agency (2017–2019)
- M. Basri Sidehabi, retired air marshal of the Indonesian Air Force (1974–2008)
- Pieter Wattimena, retired air vice-marshal of the Indonesian Air Force (1972–2004)
- Tamsil Gustari Malik, retired air marshal of the Indonesian Air Force (1987–2021)

==== Retired Indonesian Navy personnel ====
- Achmad Djamaludin, retired vice admiral of the Indonesian Navy (1984–2020)
- Deddy Muhibah Pribadi, retired vice admiral of the Indonesian Navy (1985–2019)

==== Retired Indonesian Police personnel ====
- Anas Yusuf, Governor of the Indonesian National Police Academy (2015–2017), Chief of the East Java Regional Police (2014–2015), Chief of the East Kalimantan Regional Police (2012–2013)
- Irlan Kustian, Vice Chief of the East Kalimantan Regional Police (2020)
- Oegroseno, Vice Chief of the Indonesian National Police (2013–2014)
- Susno Duadji, Head of Criminal Investigation Agency (2013–2014)

=== Businesspeople ===
- Ary Ginanjar Agustian, motivator, entrepreneur, educator, founder of ESQ Business School
- Gamal Albinsaid, doctor, health innovator and social entrepreneur
- Leontinus Alpha Edison, businessman, co-founder of Tokopedia
- Peter F. Gontha, businessman, former vice president of Bimantara Citra Group, former executives of RCTI and SCTV, founder of BTV, Indonesian Ambassador to Poland (2014–2019)
- Yusuf Muhammad Martak, vice president of Energi Mega Persada (2004–2012), treasurer of Indonesian Ulema Council (2015–2020)

=== Celebrities ===
- Abdur Arsyad, comedian
- Choky Sitohang, actor and presenter
- Didi Riyadi, actor and musician
- Frans Mohede, singer, actor and Muay-thai instructor
- Iyeth Bustami, musician
- Nafa Urbach, musician
- Narji, actor and comedian
- Olvah Alhamid, model
- Rhoma Irama, dangdut singer-songwriter and actor
- Vicky Shu, singer and model

=== Religious figures ===
- Abdul Somad, ustad, Islamic scholar and preacher
- Adi Hidayat, ustad, Vice Chairman of Majelis Tabligh Muhammadiyah (2022–present)
- Ahmad Bahauddin Nursalim, ulama, Leader of Supreme Council of Nahdlatul Ulama (2022–present)
- Anwar Manshur, ulama, Supreme Leader of the Pondok Pesantren Lirboyo (2014–present), Leader of East Java Nahdlatul Ulama Regional Supreme Council (2018–2023), Adviser of Nahdlatul Ulama (2015–present)
- Bachtiar Nasir, ustad, General Chairman of GNPF Ulama (2016–2018)
- Din Syamsuddin, Chairman of Indonesian Ulema Council (2014–2015), Chairman of Muhammadiyah (2005–2015)
- Fadlan Garamatan, ustad, Islamic preacher
- Marzuqi Mustamar, ulama, Chairman of Executive Council of Nahdlatul Ulama of East Java (2018–present)
- Muhammad Hanif Alatas, habib, Islamic scholar and preacher
- Najih Maimun, ulama, Leader of the Pondok Pesantren Al-Anwar (2019–present)
- Rizieq Shihab, habib, Grand Imam of Islamic Defenders Front (2013–2022)
- Said Aqil Siradj, General Chairman of the Executive Council of Nahdlatul Ulama (2010–2021)
- Syukron Ma'mun, ulama, Leader of the Pondok Pesantren Daarul Rahman, Chairman of Indonesian Nahdlatul Community Party (2003–2009)
- Zaitun Rasmin, ustad, General Chairman of Wahdah Islamiyah (2012–present)
- Abu Bakar Ba’asyir, cleric, Leader of Jamaah Ansharut Tauhid and Jemaah Islamiyah

== Endorsements for Prabowo Subianto ==
=== Central government ===
==== Presidents and vice presidents ====
- Susilo Bambang Yudhoyono, 6th President of Indonesia (2004–2014)
- Try Sutrisno, 6th Vice President of Indonesia (1993–1998)

==== Cabinet-level officers ====
- Moeldoko, Presidential Chief of Staff (2018–present), Commander of the National Armed Forces (2013–2015), Chief of Staff of the Army (2013)
- Agum Gumelar, Member of Presidential Advisory Council (2018–2019), Coordinating Minister for Political, Legal, and Security Affairs (2001), Minister of Transportation (2001–2004, 1999–2001), Minister of Defense (2001), Governor of National Resilience Institute (1998–1999), Commandant General of Kopassus (1993–1994)
- Luhut Binsar Pandjaitan, Coordinating Minister for Maritime and Investment Affairs (2016–present), Coordinating Minister for Political, Legal, and Security Affairs (2015–2016), Presidential Chief of Staff (2014–2015), Minister of Industry and Trade (2000–2001)
- Aburizal Bakrie, Coordinating Minister for Economic Affairs (2004–2005), Coordinating Minister for People's Welfare (2005–2009)
- Hatta Rajasa, Coordinating Minister for Economic Affairs (2009–2014), Minister of State Secretariat (2007–2009), Minister of Transportation (2004–2007), State Minister for Research and Technology (2001–2004)
- Airlangga Hartarto, Coordinating Minister for Economic Affairs (2019–present), Minister of Industry (2016–2019), member of the People's Representative Council (2004–2016)
- Wiranto, Chairman of the Presidential Advisory Council (2019–present), Coordinating Minister for Political, Legal and Security Affairs (1999–2000; 2016–2019), Commander of the Indonesian National Armed Forces (1998–1999)
- Agung Laksono, Member of the Presidential Advisory Council (2019–present), Coordinating Minister of People's Welfare (2009–2014), Speaker of the People's Representative Council (2004–2009)
- Yusril Ihza Mahendra, Minister of Law and Legislation (1999–2001), Minister of Justice and Human Rights (2001–2004), State Secretary of Indonesia (2004–2007)
- Widodo Adi Sutjipto, Coordinating Minister for Political, Legal, and Security Affairs of Indonesia (2004–2009), Member of Presidential Advisory Council (2010–2014), Commander of the Indonesian National Armed Forces (1999–2002), Chief of Staff of the Indonesian Navy (1998–1999)
- Burhanuddin Abdullah, Governor of Bank Indonesia (2003–2008), Coordinating Minister for Economics, Finance and Industry (2001)
- Pratikno, Secretary of State (2014–present), Rector of Gadjah Mada University (2012–2014)
- Erick Thohir, Minister of State Owned Enterprises (2019–present), Chair of the Football Association of Indonesia (2023–present), Chair of the Basketball Association of Indonesia (2004–2006)
- Zulkifli Hasan, Minister of Trade (2022–present), Minister of Forestry Affairs (2009–2014), Deputy speaker of the People's Consultative Assembly (2019–2022), Speaker of the People's Consultative Assembly (2014–2019)
- Agus Gumiwang Kartasasmita, Minister of Industry (2019–present), Minister of Social Affairs (2018–2019), Member of People's Representative Council (2009–2018)
- Budi Arie Setiadi, Minister of Communications and Informatics (2023–present), Deputy Minister of Villages, Development of Disadvantaged Regions, and Transmigration (2019–2023), chairman of Projo
- Amran Sulaiman, Minister of Agriculture (2014–2019, 2023–present)
- Bahlil Lahadalia, Minister of Investment (2021–present)
- Dito Ariotedjo, Minister of Youth and Sports (2023–present)
- Amir Syamsuddin, Minister of Justice and Human Rights of Indonesia (2011–2014)
- Andi Alfian Mallarangeng, Minister of Youth and Sports (2009–2012)
- Theo L. Sambuaga, Minister of Public Housing (1998–1999), Minister of Manpower (1998)
- Sharif Cicip Sutarjo, Minister of Marine Affairs and Fisheries (2011–2014)
- Linda Amalia Sari, Minister of Women Empowerment and Child Protection (2009–2014)
- Asman Abnur, Minister of State Apparatus Utilization and Bureaucratic Reform (2016–2018), Member of People's Representative Council (2004–2009, 2014–2016, 2019–present), Vice Mayor of Batam (2001–2004)
- Fuad Bawazier, Minister of Finance (1998), Member of People's Representative Council (2004–2009)
- Idrus Marham, Minister of Social Affairs (2018), Member of People's Representative Council (2004–2009, 2009–2011)
- Rosan Roeslani, Deputy Minister of State-Owned Enterprises (2023), Indonesian Ambassador to the United States (2021–2023)
- Afriansyah Noor, Deputy Minister of Manpower (2022–present)
- Raja Juli Antoni, Deputy Minister for Agrarian Affairs and Spatial Planning (2022–present)
- Jerry Sambuaga, Deputy Minister of Trade (2019–present)
- Paiman Raharjo, Deputy Minister of Villages, Development of Disadvantaged Regions, and Transmigration (2023–present)
- Sjafrie Sjamsoeddin, Deputy Minister of Defence (2010–2014), retired lieutenant general of Indonesian Army

==== Members of national parliament ====
- Bambang Soesatyo, Speaker of the People's Consultative Assembly (2019–present), Speaker of the People's Representative Council (2018–2019), Member of People's Representative Council (2009–present)
- E. E. Mangindaan, Deputy Speaker of People's Consultative Assembly (2014–2019), Minister of Transportation (2011–2014), Minister of State Apparatus Utilization and Bureaucratic Reform (2009–2014), Member of People's Representative Council (2004–2009, 2014–2019), Governor of North Sulawesi (1995–2000)
- Fahri Hamzah, Deputy Speaker of People's Representative Council on People's Welfare (2014–2019), Member of People's Representative Council (2004–2019)
- Fadli Zon, Acting Speaker of People's Representative Council (2015–2016, 2017–2018), Deputy Speaker of People's Representative Council (2014–2019), Member of People's Representative Council (2014–present)
- Anis Matta, Deputy Speaker of the People's Representative Council (2009–2013) President of the Prosperous Justice Party (2013–2015), Chairman of Gelora Party (2019–present)
- Syarief Hasan, Deputy Speaker of People's Consultative Assembly (2019–present), Minister of Cooperatives and Small & Medium Enterprises (2009–2014), Member of People's Representative Council (2004–2009, 2014–2019, 2019–present)
- Marzuki Alie, Speaker of the People's Representative Council (2009–2014)
- Ahmad Muzani, Deputy Speaker of the People's Consultative Assembly (2018–2019, 2018–present), Member of People's Representative Council (2009–present)
- Sufmi Dasco Ahmad, Second Deputy Speaker of the People's Representative Council (2019–present), Member of the People's Representative Council (2014–present)
- Lodewijk Freidrich Paulus, First Deputy Speaker of the People's Representative Council (2021–present), Member of People's Representative Council (2019–present), General Commander of Kopassus (2009–2011)
- Yandri Susanto, Deputy Speaker of the People's Consultative Assembly (2022–present), Member of the People's Representative Council (2012–2014, 2014–2019, 2019–present)
- Budiman Sudjatmiko, Member of the People's Representative Council (2009–2019), activist during the New Order
- Effendi Simbolon, Member of People's Representative Council (2004–2009, 2009–2014, 2014–2019, 2019–present)
- Benny Kabur Harman, Member of the People's Representative Council (2004–2008, 2009–2018, 2019–present), Member of Regional Representative Council (2009–2014)
- Nurdin Halid, Member of the People's Representative Council (1999–2004), Chair of the Football Association of Indonesia (2003–2011)
- Dedi Mulyadi, Member of the People's Representative Council (2019–present), Regent of Purwakarta (2008–2013, 2013–2018), Vice Regent of Purwakarta (2003–2008)
- Mulan Jameela, Member of People's Representative Council (2019–present)
- Dhohir Farisi, Member of People's Representative Council (2009–2014)
- Nusron Wahid, Member of People's Representative Council (2004–2015, 2019–present), Vice Chairman of the Executive Council of Nahdlatul Ulama (2022–present)
- Edhie Baskoro Yudhoyono, Member of People's Representative Council (2019–present)
- Ace Hasan Syadzily, Member of People's Representative Council (2013–2014, 2017–2019, 2019–present)
- Muhammad Sarmuji, Member of People's Representative Council (2014–present)
- Andi Iwan Darmawan Aras, Member of People's Representative Council (2014–present)
- Andre Rosiade, Member of People's Representative Council (2019–present)
- Gus Irawan Pasaribu, Member of People's Representative Council (2014–present)
- Hendrik Lewerissa, Member of People's Representative Council (2019–present)
- Nurul Arifin, Member of People's Representative Council (2009–2014, 2019–present)
- Hinca Panjaitan, Member of People's Representative Council (2018–present)
- Rahayu Saraswati, Member of People's Representative Council (2014–2019) (Prabowo's niece)
- Aryo Djojohadikusumo, Member of People's Representative Council (2014–2019) (Prabowo's nephew)
- Eddy Soeparno, Member of People's Representative Council (2019–present)
- Mahfudz Siddiq, Member of People's Representative Council (2004–2009, 2009–2014, 2014–2019)
- Eko Patrio, Member of People's Representative Council (2009–present)
- Habiburokhman, Member of People's Representative Council (2019–present)
- Ali Masykur Musa, Member of People's Representative Council (1999–2004, 2004–2009), Member of the Supreme Audit Agency (2009–2014)
- Titiek Suharto, Member of People's Representative Council (2014–2018), daughter of 2nd President Suharto (Prabowo's former wife)
- Achmad Hafisz Tohir, Member of People's Representative Council (2014–2019, 2019–present)
- Nasrullah, Member of People's Representative Council (2009–2014)
- Dedi Gumelar, Member of People's Representative Council (2009–2014)
- Ratih Sanggarwati, Member of People's Representative Council (2018–2019)
- Sayed Fuad Zakaria, Member of People's Representative Council (2009–2014)
- Laode Masihu Kamaluddin, Member of People's Consultative Assembly (1993–1997, 1999–2004), Member of People's Representative Council (1997–1999, 2004–2009)
- Sarjan Tahir, Member of People's Representative Council (2004–2008)
- Vera Febyanthy, Member of People's Representative Council (2009–2014, 2014–2019, 2019–present)
- Mohamad Hekal, Member of People's Representative Council (2014–2019, 2019–present)
- Budi Djiwandono, Member of the People's Representative Council (2017–2019, 2019–present) (Prabowo's nephew)
- Dyah Roro Esti Widya Putri, Member of the People's Representative Council (2019–present)
- Rizki Aulia Rahman Natakusumah, Member of the People's Representative Council (2019–present)
- Sarifuddin Sudding, Member of the People's Representative Council (2009–2014, 2014–2018, 2019–present)
- Adies Kadir, Member of the People's Representative Council (2014–2019, 2019–present)
- Supriansa, Member of the People's Representative Council (2019–present), Vice Regent of Soppeng Regency (2016–2018)
- Andi Achmad Dara, Member of the People's Representative Council (2019–present)
- Himmatul Aliyah, Member of the People's Representative Council (2019–present)
- Kamrussamad, Member of the People's Representative Council (2019–present)
- Moreno Soeprapto, Member of the People's Representative Council (2014–2019, 2019–present)
- Suhardi Duka, Member of the People's Representative Council (2019–present), Regent of Mamuju Regency (2005–2010, 2010–2015)
- La Tinro La Tunrung, Member of the People's Representative Council (2019–present), Regent of Enrekang Regency (2013–2018, 2018–2023)
- Azikin Solthan, Member of the People's Representative Council (2014–2019, 2019–present), Regent of Bantaeng Regency (1998–2003, 2003–2008)
- Ashabul Kahfi, Member of the People's Representative Council (2019–present), Deputy Speaker of South Sulawesi Regional House of Representatives (2014–2019)
- Martin Hutabarat, Member of the People's Representative Council (1987–1992, 2009–2014, 2014–2019)
- Djohar Arifin Husin, Member of the People's Representative Council (2019–present), Chair of the Football Association of Indonesia (2011–2015)
- Darizal Basir, Member of the People's Representative Council (2009–2014, 2014–2019, 2019–present), Regent of Pesisir Selatan Regency (1995–2000, 2000–2005)
- Muhidin M. Said, Member of People's Representative Council (2004–2009, 2009–2014, 2014–2019, 2019–present), Member of People's Consultative Assembly (1992–2004)
- Rudy Mas'ud, Member of the People's Representative Council (2019–present)
- Desy Ratnasari, Member of the People's Representative Council (2014–2019, 2019–present)

==== Independent agencies ====
- Abdullah Mahmud Hendropriyono, Head of the Indonesian State Intelligence Agency (2001–2004), Minister of Transmigration and Forest Squatter Settlements (1998–1999), Chairman of Indonesian Justice and Unity Party (2016–2018)
- J. Soedradjad Djiwandono, Governor of Bank Indonesia (1993–1998) (Prabowo's brother-in-law)
- Subur Budhisantoso, Member of Presidential Advisory Council (2007–2010), Leader of the Democratic Party (2001–2005)
- Putri Kuswisnu Wardani, Member of Presidential Advisory Council (2019–present)
- Juri Ardiantoro, Chairman of the General Elections Commission (2016–2017)
- Mochamad Iriawan, Principal Secretary of National Resilience Institute (2018–2020), Chair of the Football Association of Indonesia (2019–2023)
- Boy Rafli Amar, Chief of National Counter Terrorism Agency (2020–2023)
- Akbar Buchari, General Chairperson of the Central Governing Body of the Indonesian Young Entrepreneurs Association (2022–present)

=== Provincial government ===
==== Governors and vice governors ====
- Khofifah Indar Parawansa, Governor of East Java (2019–2023), Minister of Social Affairs (2014–2018), State Minister of Female Empowerment (1999–2001), Deputy Speaker of People's Representative Council (1999)
- Ridwan Kamil, Governor of West Java (2018–2023), Mayor of Bandung (2013–2018)
- Andi Sudirman Sulaiman, Governor of South Sulawesi (2022–2023), Vice Governor of South Sulawesi (2018–2022)
- Rohidin Mersyah, Governor of Bengkulu (2018–2021, 2021–present), Vice Governor of Bengkulu (2016–2017), Vice Regent of South Bengkulu Regency (2010–2015)
- Murad Ismail, Governor of Maluku (2019–present), Commander of the Mobile Brigade Corps (2015–2018)
- Arinal Djunaidi, Governor of Lampung (2019–present)
- Rusdy Mastura, Governor of Central Sulawesi (2021–present), Mayor of Palu (2005–2015)
- Syamsuar, Governor of Riau (2019–present), Regent of Siak (2011–2019)
- Al Haris, Governor of Jambi (2021–present), Regent of Merangin Regency (2013–2018, 2018–2021), Chairman of Association of Indonesian Provincial Governments (2023–present)
- Soekarwo, Governor of East Java (2009–2019), Member of Presidential Advisory Council (2019–present)
- Bibit Waluyo, Governor of Central Java (2008–2013)
- Erzaldi Rosman Djohan, Governor of Bangka-Belitung Islands (2017–2022), Regent of Central Bangka (2010–2015, 2016–2017)
- Longki Djanggola, Governor of Central Sulawesi (2011–2021)
- Syahrial Oesman, Governor of South Sumatra (2003–2008), Regent of Ogan Komering Ulu Regency (2000–2003)
- Isran Noor, Governor of East Kalimantan (2018–2023), Regent of East Kutai (2009–2015), Vice Regent of East Kutai (2006–2009)
- Ahmad Riza Patria, Vice Governor of Jakarta (2020–2022), Member of People's Representative Council (2014–2020)
- Prijanto, Vice Governor of Jakarta (2007–2012), retired Major general of Indonesian Army
- Ma'mun Amir, Vice Governor of Central Sulawesi (2021–present), Regent of Banggai Regency (2006–2011)
- Emil Dardak, Vice Governor of East Java (2019–present), Regent of Trenggalek (2016–2019)
- Deddy Mizwar, Vice Governor of West Java (2013–2018), actor, film director
- Musa Rajekshah, Vice Governor of North Sumatra (2018–2023)
- Hadi Mulyadi, Vice Governor of East Kalimantan (2018–2023), Member of People's Representative Council (2014–2018)
- Ishak Mekki, Vice Governor of South Sumatra (2013–2018), Regent of Ogan Komering Ilir Regency (2004–2009, 2009–2013), Member of People's Representative Council (2019–present)
- Yansen Tipa Padan, Vice Governor of North Kalimantan (2021–present), Regent of Malinau Regency (2011–2016, 2016–2021)
- Muzakir Manaf, Vice Governor of Aceh (2012–2017), Leader of Aceh Party (2007–present)
- Rusli Baco Dg. Palabbi, Vice Governor of Central Sulawesi (2019–2021)
- Agus Arifin Nu'mang, Vice Governor of South Sulawesi (2008–2013, 2013–2018), Speaker of South Sulawesi Regional House of Representatives (2004–2008)
- Dede Yusuf, Vice Governor of West Java (2008–2013), Member of People's Representative Council (2004–2008, 2014–present)
- Mawardi Yahya, Vice Governor of South Sumatra (2018–2023), Regent of Ogan Ilir Regency (2005–2010, 2010–2015)

==== Members of provincial parliament ====
- Andra Soni, Speaker of Banten Regional House of Representatives (2019–present)
- Anita Noeringhati, Speaker of South Sumatra Regional House of Representatives (2019–present), Member of South Sumatra Regional House of Representatives (2009–2014, 2014–2019, 2019–present)
- Baiq Isvie Rupaeda, Speaker of West Nusa Tenggara Regional House of Representatives (2016–2019, 2019–present), Member of West Nusa Tenggara Regional House of Representatives (2014–2019, 2019–present), Member of People's Consultative Assembly (1999–2004)
- Supardi, Speaker of West Sumatra Regional House of Representatives (2019–present), Member of West Sumatra Regional House of Representatives (2009–2014, 2014–2019, 2019–present)
- Taufik Hidayat, Speaker of West Java Regional House of Representatives (2019–present)
- Wagirin Arman, Speaker of North Sumatra Regional House of Representatives (2014–2019), Member of North Sumatra Regional House of Representatives (2019–present)
- Harun Mustafa Nasution, Deputy Speaker of North Sumatra Regional House of Representatives (2019–present)
- Rani Mauliani, Deputy Speaker of Jakarta Regional House of Representatives (2022–present)
- Teuku Raja Keumangan, Deputy Speaker of Aceh House of Representatives (2022–present)
- Zita Anjani, Deputy Speaker of Jakarta Regional House of Representatives (2019–present)
- Anggara Wicitra Sastroamidjojo, Member of Jakarta Regional House of Representatives (2019–2023), grandson of 8th & 10th Prime Minister of Indonesia Ali Sastroamidjojo
- Hasbullah Rahmad, Member of West Java Regional House of Representatives (2009–2014, 2014–2019, 2019–present)
- Tondi Roni Tua, Member of North Sumatra Regional House of Representatives (2019–present)
- Viani Limardi, Member of Jakarta Regional House of Representatives (2019–present)

=== Municipal government ===
==== Mayors and regents ====
- Airin Rachmi Diany, Mayor of South Tangerang (2011–2021)
- Akhyar Nasution, Mayor of Medan (2019–2021), Vice Mayor of Medan (2016–2019)
- Andi Harun, Mayor of Samarinda (2021–present)
- Bima Arya Sugiarto, Mayor of Bogor (2014–present)
- Bobby Nasution, Mayor of Medan (2021–present)
- Eddy Santana Putra, Mayor of Palembang (2003–2008, 2008–2013), Member of People's Representative Council (2019–present)
- Helldy Agustian, Mayor of Cilegon (2021–present)
- Hendri Septa, Mayor of Padang (2021–present)
- Ilham Arief Sirajuddin, Mayor of Makassar (2004–2009, 2009–2014), Member of South Sulawesi Regional House of Representatives (1999–2004)
- Jimmy Rimba Rogi, Mayor of Manado (2005–2008)
- Mulyadi Jayabaya, Regent of Lebak Regency (2003–2008, 2008–2013)
- Ngatiyana, Mayor of Cimahi (2022), Acting Mayor of Cimahi (2020–2022), Vice Mayor of Cimahi (2017–2020)
- Taufan Pawe, Mayor of Parepare (2013–2018, 2018–2023)
- Yuliyanto, Mayor of Salatiga (2011–2022)
- Abdul Faris Umlati, Regent of Raja Ampat Regency (2016–2021, 2021–present)
- Aditya Halindra Faridzky, Regent of Tuban Regency (2021–present), Member of East Java Regional House of Representatives (2019–2020)
- Aliong Mus, Regent of Taliabu Island Regency (2016–2021, 2021–present)
- Cik Ujang, Regent of Lahat Regency (2018–present)
- Dico Ganinduto, Regent of Kendal (2021–present)
- Djoko Nugroho, Regent of Blora Regency (2010–2015, 2016–2021)
- Idealisman Dachi, Regent of South Nias Regency (2011–2016)
- Indah Dhamayanti Putri, Regent of Bima Regency (2016–2021, 2021–present)
- Iti Octavia Jayabaya, Regent of Lebak Regency (2014–present), Member of People's Representative Council (2009–2014)
- Iskandar, Regent of Ogan Komering Ilir Regency (2014–2019, 2019–present), Vice Regent of Ogan Ilir Regency (2005–2010)
- Joncik Muhammad, Regent of Empat Lawang Regency (2018–present)
- Juliyatmono, Regent of Karanganyar (2013–2023)
- Khairuddin Syah Sitorus, Regent of North Labuhanbatu Regency (2010–2015, 2016–2020)
- Lalu Pathul Bahri, Regent of Central Lombok (2021–present)
- Mahmud Abdullah, Regent of Sumbawa Regency (2021–present), Vice Regent of Sumbawa (2016–2021)
- Mohammad Uswanas, Regent of Fakfak Regency (2010–2015, 2016–2021)
- Musa Ahmad, Regent of Central Lampung Regency (2021–present), Vice Regent of Central Lampung Regency (2008–2010)
- Ngogesa Sitepu, Regent of Langkat Regency (2009–2014, 2014–2019)
- Popo Ali Martopo, Regent of South Ogan Komering Ulu Regency (2016–present)
- Ratna Machmud, Regent of Musi Rawas Regency (2021–present)
- Ratu Tatu Chasanah, Regent of Serang Regency (2016–present), Vice Regent of Serang Regency (2010–2015)
- Rudy Gunawan, Regent of Garut (2014–present)
- Rustam Effendy Nainggolan, Regent of North Tapanuli Regency (1999–2004), Secretary of North Sumatra (2008–2010)
- Saipul A. Mbuinga, Regent of Pohuwato Regency (2021–present)
- Suhaili Fadhil Thohir, Regent of Central Lombok Regency (2010–2015, 2016–2021)
- Untung Tamsil, Regent of Fakfak Regency (2021–present)
- Kherlani, Acting Regent of South Lampung Regency (2015–2016), Acting Regent of Pesisir Barat Regency (2013–2015), Vice Mayor of Bandar Lampung (2005–2010, 2010–2015)
- Syah Afandin, Acting Regent of Langkat Regency (2022–present), Vice Regent of Langkat (2019–2022)
- Sigit Purnomo Said, Vice Mayor of Palu (2016–2021), former lead singer of Ungu
- Sofyan Edi Jarwoko, Vice Mayor of Malang (2018–2023)
- Timbas Tarigan, Vice Mayor of Binjai (2010–2015, 2016–2021)
- Atika Azmi Utammi, Vice Regent of Mandailing Natal Regency (2021–present)
- Dahlan M. Noer, Vice Regent of Bima Regency (2016–present)
- Desra Ediwan Anantanur, Vice Regent of Solok Regency (2005–2010, 2010–2015)
- Islan Hanura, Vice Regent of Musi Banyuasin Regency (2019–2012)
- Suharsi Igirisa, Vice Regent of Pohuwato Regency (2021–present)

==== Members of municipal parliament ====
- Ihwan Ritonga, Deputy Speaker of Medan City Regional House of Representatives (2019–present)
- Tengku Rizki Aljupri, Member of Tegal City Regional House of Representatives (2019–present)

=== Other politicians ===
- Ade Armando, activist and academician
- Ahmad Ridha Sabana, Leader of the Garuda Party (2015–present)
- Agus Harimurti Yudhoyono, Leader of the Democratic Party (2020–present)
- Agus Jabo Priyono, General Chairman of Just and Prosperous People's Party (2021–present), former Chairman of People's Democratic Party
- Dedek Prayudi, Indonesian Solidarity Party politician
- Faldo Maldini, Indonesian Solidarity Party politician
- Fauzan Rachmansyah, Secretary General of the Berkarya Party (2022–present)
- Grace Natalie, Leader of the Indonesian Solidarity Party (2014–2021), former television newsreader and journalist
- Giring Ganesha, Chairman of the Indonesian Solidarity Party (2021–2023), political activist, former lead singer of Nidji
- Hercules, political broker
- Immanuel Ebenezer, activist and politician
- Isyana Bagoes Oka, Indonesian Solidarity Party politician
- Kaesang Pangarep, chairman of the Indonesian Solidarity Party (2023–present)
- Muchdi Purwoprandjono, chairman of the Berkarya Party (2020–present)
- Nurmala Kartini Sjahrir, Leader of New Indonesia Party of Struggle (2007–2011), Indonesia Ambassador to Argentina (2010–2014)
- Tsamara Amany, politician

=== Retired military and police personnel ===
==== Retired Indonesian Army personnel ====
- Agustadi Sasongko Purnomo, Chief of Staff of the Indonesian Army (2007–2009)
- Fransen G. Siahaan, Commander of Kodam XVII/Cenderawasih (2014–2015), retired major general of Indonesian Army
- Nachrowi Ramli, retired major general of Indonesian Army
- R. Gautama Wiranegara, retired major general of Indonesian Army
- Sumardi, Commander of Indonesian National Armed Forces Doctrine, Education and Training Development Command (2016–2017), retired major general of Indonesian Army

==== Retired Indonesian Air Force personnel ====
- Dwi Badarmanto, retired air commodore of Indonesian Air Force
- Imam Sufaat, Chief of Staff of the Indonesian Air Force (2009–2012)
- Ida Bagus Putu Dunia, Chief of Staff of the Indonesian Air Force (2012–2015)
- M. Dadan Gunawan, retired air commodore of Indonesian Air Force

==== Retired Indonesian Navy personnel ====
- Achmad Sutjipto, Chief of Staff of the Indonesian Navy (1999–2000)
- Arie Soedewo, Head of Indonesian Maritime Security Agency (2016–2018), retired vice admiral of Indonesian Navy
- Mochamad Jurianto, retired vice admiral of Indonesian Navy
- Moekhlas Sidik, retired vice admiral of Indonesian Navy
- Iskandar Sitompul, retired rear admiral of Indonesian Navy

==== Retired Indonesian Police personnel ====
- Sutanto, Chief of the Indonesian National Police (2005–2008)
- Idham Azis, Chief of the Indonesian National Police (2018–2021), Chief of Bareskrim (2019)
- Sutarman, Chief of the Indonesian National Police (2013–2015), Chief of Bareskrim (2011–2013)
- Ari Dono Sukmanto, Vice Chief of the Indonesian National Police (2018–2020), Chief of Bareskrim (2016–2018)
- Adnas, Chief of Gorontalo Regional Police (2020)
- Condro Kirono, Chief of Central Java Regional Police (2016–2019)
- Yovianes Mahar, Chief of Bengkulu Regional Police (2016–2017)
- Damisnur A.M., retired inspector general of the Indonesian National Police
- Frederik Kalalembang, retired inspector general of the Indonesian National Police
- Idris Kadir, retired brigadier general of the Indonesian National Police

=== Businesspeople ===
- Bayu Priawan Djokosoetono, commissioner of Blue Bird Group
- Didit Hediprasetyo, fashion designer (Prabowo's son)
- Erwin Aksa, businessman, commissioner of Bosowa Corp
- Hashim Djojohadikusumo, vice chair of Gerindra Founders Board (Prabowo's younger brother)
- Jusuf Hamka, businessman, owner of Citra Marga Nusaphala Persada
- Kukrit Suryo Wicaksono, entrepreneur, social activist, and Chief executive officer of Suara Merdeka
- Olfriady Letunggamu, businessman, president director of Prima Nusantara Group
- Pandu Patria Sjahrir, businessman, director of TBS Energi Utama

=== Celebrities ===
- Aan Story, entrepreneur, composer, and producer
- Anna Shirley, actress
- Ahmad Dhani, musician, frontman of Dewa 19
- Atta Halilintar, YouTuber, content creator, social media personality, actor, singer and businessman
- Dewa 19, rock band
- Fauzi Baadilla, actor, model, and politician
- Helmy Yahya, television presenter, actor, producer, and politician
- Jaja Mihardja, actor, comedian, singer, and presenter
- Jessica Mila, actress
- Kiky Saputri, comedian, actress, and presenter
- Kirana Larasati, actress, politician
- Melly Goeslaw, singer, songwriter, composer, producer, and writer
- Nagita Slavina, actress, presenter, singer and businesswoman
- Nikita Mirzani, actress, model, singer, presenter, film producer, and entrepreneur
- Neno Warisman, actress, singer, activist, and politician
- Raffi Ahmad, actor, presenter, singer, entrepreneur, media personality, and producer
- Verrell Bramasta, actor, model, singer, and politician
- Zarry Hendrik, comedian and writer
- Zebi Magnolia Fawwaz, Former member of JKT48

=== Religious figures ===
- Muhammad Luthfi bin Yahya, habib, Islamic preacher, National Leader of the Jam'iyyah Ahlith Thariqah al-Mu'tabarah an-Nahdliyyah (2000–present), Adviser of Nahdlatul Ulama (2015–present), Member of Presidential Advisory Council (2019–present)
- Syech bin Abdul Qodir Assegaf, habib, Islamic preacher, Leader of Majelis Ahbaabul Musthofa (1998–present), A'wan of Nahdlatul Ulama (2022–present)
- Nabiel Al Musawa, habib, Islamic preacher, Leader of Majelis Rasulullah (2014–present), Vice Chairman of Dawah Commission of Indonesian Ulema Council (2020–present), Member of the People's Representative Council (2009–2014)
- Machfudhoh Aly Ubaid, ulama, female cleric, Adviser of Nahdlatul Ulama (2022–present), Leader of Pondok Pesantren Putri Al Lathifiyyah 1 Bahrul Ulum Tambakberas (1994–present), Member of the People's Representative Council (2004–2009)
- Hasib Wahab Chasbullah, Leader of Pondok Pesantren Bahrul Ulum Tambakberas (2006–present), Chairman of Executive Council of Nahdlatul Ulama (2022–present), Member of the People's Representative Council (2004–2009)
- Lalu Gede Muhammad Zainuddin Atsani, Chairman of the Executive Council of Nahdlatul Wathan (2019–present)
- Muhammad Murtadho Dimyathi, ulama, Adviser of Nahdlatul Ulama of Banten (2018–present)
- Miftah Maulana Habiburrahman, ulama, Islamic preacher
- Hasan Mutawakkil 'Alallah, Leader of Pesantren Zainul Hasan Genggong (1991–present)
- Abdul Ghofur, ulama, Adviser of Nahdlatul Ulama of East Java
- Abdul Hakim Mahfudz, Leader of Pondok Pesantren Tebuireng (2020–present), Chairman of Executive Council of Nahdlatul Ulama (2022–present)
- Anwar Iskandar, Chairman of Indonesian Ulema Council (2023–present), Vice General Leader of Supreme Council of Nahdlatul Ulama (2022–present)
- Arrazy Hasyim, ulama, Islamic preacher, Islamic Education Movement cleric
- Asep Saifuddin Chalim, ulama, Chairman of Nahdlatul Ulama Teachers Association (2011–present)
- Bonar Napitupulu, Ephorus of the Batak Christian Protestant Church (2004–2012)
- Misbahul Munir Kholil, ulama, Islamic preacher
- Mas'oed Abidin, ulama, Chairman of West Sumatra Indonesian Ulema Council (2003–2006)

=== Sports figures ===
- Aris Budi Prasetyo, former Indonesia national team player
- Marcus Fernandi Gideon, professional badminton player
- Pratama Arhan, professional footballer, Indonesia national team player
- Taufik Hidayat, former badminton player, Olympic gold medalist in Athens 2004
- Wisnu Wardhana, former Indonesian swimmer

=== Other figures ===
- Hotman Paris Hutapea, lawyer
- Otto Hasibuan, lawyer and businessman
- Sudjarwadi, Rector of Gadjah Mada University (2007–2012)

== Endorsements for Ganjar Pranowo ==
=== Central government ===
==== Presidents and vice presidents ====
- Megawati Sukarnoputri, 5th President of Indonesia (2001–2004); leader of the Indonesian Democratic Party of Struggle

==== Cabinet-level officers ====
- Alwi Shihab, Coordinating Minister for Human Development and Cultural Affairs (2004–2005), Minister of Foreign Affairs (1999–2001)
- Angela Tanoesoedibjo, Vice Minister of Tourism and Creative Economy (2019–present)
- Sandiaga Uno, Minister of Tourism and Creative Economy (2020–present), Vice Governor of Jakarta (2017–2018)
- Siswono Yudo Husodo, Minister of Transmigration and Forest Settlement (1993–1998), Minister of Public Housing (1988–1993), Member of the People's Representative Council (2009–2014), Member of the People's Consultative Assembly (1999–2004)
- Tri Rismaharini, Minister of Social Affairs (2020–present), Mayor of Surabaya (2010–2015, 2016–2020)

==== Members of national parliament ====
- Puan Maharani, Speaker of the People's Representative Council (2019–present), Coordinating Minister for Human Development and Cultural Affairs (2014–2019), Member of People's Representative Council (2009–2014, 2019–present)
- Oesman Sapta Odang, Speaker of Regional Representative Council (2017–2019), Deputy Speaker of People's Consultative Assembly (2002–2004, 2014–2019), Leader of People's Conscience Party (2016–present)
- Ahmad Basarah, Deputy Speaker of People's Consultative Assembly (2018–2019, 2019–present), Member of People's Representative Council (2004–2009, 2009–2014, 2014–2019, 2019–present)
- Arwani Thomafi, Member of People's Representative Council (2009–2014, 2014–2019, 2019–present), Secretary-General of the United Development Party (2021–present)
- Bambang Wuryanto, Member of People's Representative Council (2004–2009, 2009–2014, 2014–2019, 2019–present)
- Guruh Sukarnoputra, Member of People's Representative Council (1999–2004, 2004–2009, 2009–2014, 2014–2019, 2019–present)
- Hasto Kristiyanto, Member of People's Representative Council (2004–2009), Secretary-General of the Indonesian Democratic Party of Struggle (2014–present)
- Hendrawan Supratikno, Member of People's Representative Council (2009–2014, 2014–2019, 2019–present)
- Johan Budi, Member of People's Representative Council (2019–present)
- Junimart Girsang, Member of People's Representative Council (2014–2019, 2019–present)
- Puti Guntur Sukarno, Member of People's Representative Council (2009–2014, 2014–2019, 2019–present)
- Rudianto Tjen, Member of People's Representative Council (2004–2009, 2009–2014, 2014–2019, 2019–present)
- Utut Adianto, former chess player, Member of People's Representative Council (2009–2014, 2014–2019, 2019–present)

==== Independent agencies ====
- Andi Widjajanto, Governor of National Resilience Institute (2022–present), Cabinet Secretary (2014–2015)
- Djan Faridz, Member of the Presidential Advisory Council (2023–present), Minister of Public Housing (2011–2014), Member of Regional Representative Council (2009–2011)
- Eko Sulistyo, Commissioner of Perusahaan Listrik Negara (2019–present)
- Heru Dewanto, Deputy Chairman for Education and Culture Affairs of the Indonesian Chamber of Commerce and Industry (2021–present)
- Jaleswari Pramodhawardhani, Deputy Chief of Staff for Politics, Law, Defense, Security, and Human Rights (2016–present), Commissioner of Pindad (2021–present)
- Muhamad Mardiono, Member of Presidential Advisory Council (2019–2022), Acting Chairman of the United Development Party (2022–present)
- Sandrayati Moniaga, Commissioner for Studies and Research of the National Commission on Human Rights (2017–2022), Deputy Head of External Affairs of the National Commission on Human Rights (2012–2013)

=== Provincial government ===
==== Governors and vice governors ====
- Abdul Ghani Kasuba, Governor of North Maluku (2014–2023), Vice Governor of North Maluku (2008–2013)
- Basuki Tjahaja Purnama, President Commissioner of Pertamina; Governor of Jakarta (2014–2017)
- I Wayan Koster, Governor of Bali (2018–2023; 2025-present)
- Muhammad Zainul Majdi, Governor of West Nusa Tenggara (2008–2018), ulama, General Chairman of Nahdlatul Wathan Diniyah Islamiyah (2021–present)
- Olly Dondokambey, Governor of North Sulawesi (2016–2024, Member of People's Representative Council (2004–2009, 2009–2014, 2014–2015)
- Rano Karno, Governor of Banten (2015–2017)
- Solihin G. P., Governor of West Java (1970–1975), retired lieutenant general of Indonesian Army (1948–1968), Governor of Indonesian Military Academy (1968–1970)
- Taj Yasin Maimoen, Vice Governor of Central Java (2018–2023)
- Uu Ruzhanul Ulum, Vice Governor of West Java (2018–2023)

==== Members of provincial parliament ====
- William Aditya Sarana, Member of Jakarta Regional House of Representatives (2019–present)
- Tina Toon, Member of Jakarta Regional House of Representatives (2019–present)

=== Municipal government ===
==== Mayors and regents ====
- Eri Cahyadi, Mayor of Surabaya (2021–present)
- F. X. Hadi Rudyatmo, Mayor of Surakarta (2012–2021)
- Mohammad Ramdhan Pomanto, Mayor of Makassar (2014–2019; 2021–present)

==== Members of municipal parliament ====
- Hasyim, Speaker of Medan City Regional House of Representatives (2019–present)

=== Other politicians ===
- Ahmad Rofiq, Secretary-General of the Perindo Party (2015–present)
- Denny Siregar, social media activist
- Dwi Rubiyanti Kholifah, Indonesian Women's rights leader and Human rights activist
- Hary Tanoesoedibjo, Leader of Perindo Party (2014–present), conglomerate, President Commissioner of Media Nusantara Citra
- Muhammad Guntur Romli, writer and activist
- Siti Nur Azizah, law expert, 4th daughter of Vice President Ma'ruf Amin
- Sukmawati Sukarnoputri, Leader of Indonesian National Party Marhaenism
- Todung Mulya Lubis, Indonesian Ambassador to Norway (2018–2022), lawyer and activist
- Yenny Wahid, Director of The Wahid Institute, Daughter of 4th President Abdurrahman Wahid

=== Retired military and police personnel ===
==== Retired Indonesian Army personnel ====
- Andika Perkasa, Commander of the Indonesian National Armed Forces (2021–2022)
- Ita Jayadi, retired brigadier general of the Indonesian Army (1987–2022)
- Joni Supriyanto, General Chief of Staff of the Indonesian National Armed Forces (2019–2020), Head of the Indonesian Strategic Intelligence Agency (2020–2022), Commander of Kodam Jayakarta (2018–2019)
- Samuel Petrus Hehakaya, retired brigadier general of the Indonesian Army (1987–2022)

==== Retired Indonesian Air Force personnel ====
- Tatang Harlyansyah, retired air marshal of the Indonesian Air Force (1987—2022), Commander of the Indonesian Air Force Doctrine, Education and Training Development Command (2019–2022), Superintendent of the Indonesian Air Force Academy (2018–2019)

==== Retired Indonesian Navy personnel ====
- Bernard Kent Sondakh, Chief of Staff of the Indonesian Navy (2002–2005)
- Desi Albert Mamahit, retired vice admiral of the Indonesian Navy (1984–2017), Head of the Indonesian Maritime Security Agency (2015–2016)

==== Retired Indonesian Police personnel ====
- Da'i Bachtiar, Chief of the Indonesian National Police (2001–2005)
- Gatot Eddy Pramono, Vice Chief of the Indonesian National Police (2020–2023)
- Luki Hermawan, Vice Chief of the National Cyber and Crypto Agency (2022–2023), Chief of East Java Regional Police (2018–2020)

=== Businesspeople ===
- Arsjad Rasjid, businessman, Chairman of the Indonesian Chamber of Commerce and Industry (2021–present)
- Denon Prawiraatmadja, businessman
- Miftah Sabri, online media and e-commerce entrepreneur, researcher and politician

=== Celebrities ===
- Adhisty Zara, actress & singer, ex-JKT48 member
- Aiman Witjaksono, journalist, news anchor and interviewer at RCTI
- Arnold Poernomo, celebrity chef
- Arie Kriting, comedian, actor, writer, and producer
- Cak Lontong, comedian
- Ernest Prakasa, comedian, actor, writer, and producer
- Fujianti Utami Putri, internet celebrity
- Gilang Dirga, presenter, actor and comedian
- Ike Suharjo, former news presenter of tvOne
- Once Mekel, singer
- Putri Ayu Silaen, singer
- Roy Marten, actor
- Slank, rock band group
- Tamara Geraldine, presenter and author
- Young Lex, rapper and actor

=== Religious figures ===
- Ahmad Muhtadi Dimyathi, ulama, Adviser of Nahdlatul Ulama (2015–present)
- Ahmad Muwafiq, ulama, Nahdlatul Ulama preacher

=== Other figures ===
- Guntur Sukarnoputra, activist, eldest son of President Sukarno
- Ilham Akbar Habibie, aerospace engineer, son of President B. J. Habibie
