= Coordinating Ministry for Human Development and Cultural Affairs =

Government ministry of Indonesia

- Kementerian Koordinator Bidang Pembangunan Manusia dan Kebudayaan
- Seal of the Coordinating Ministry for Human Development and Cultural Affairs

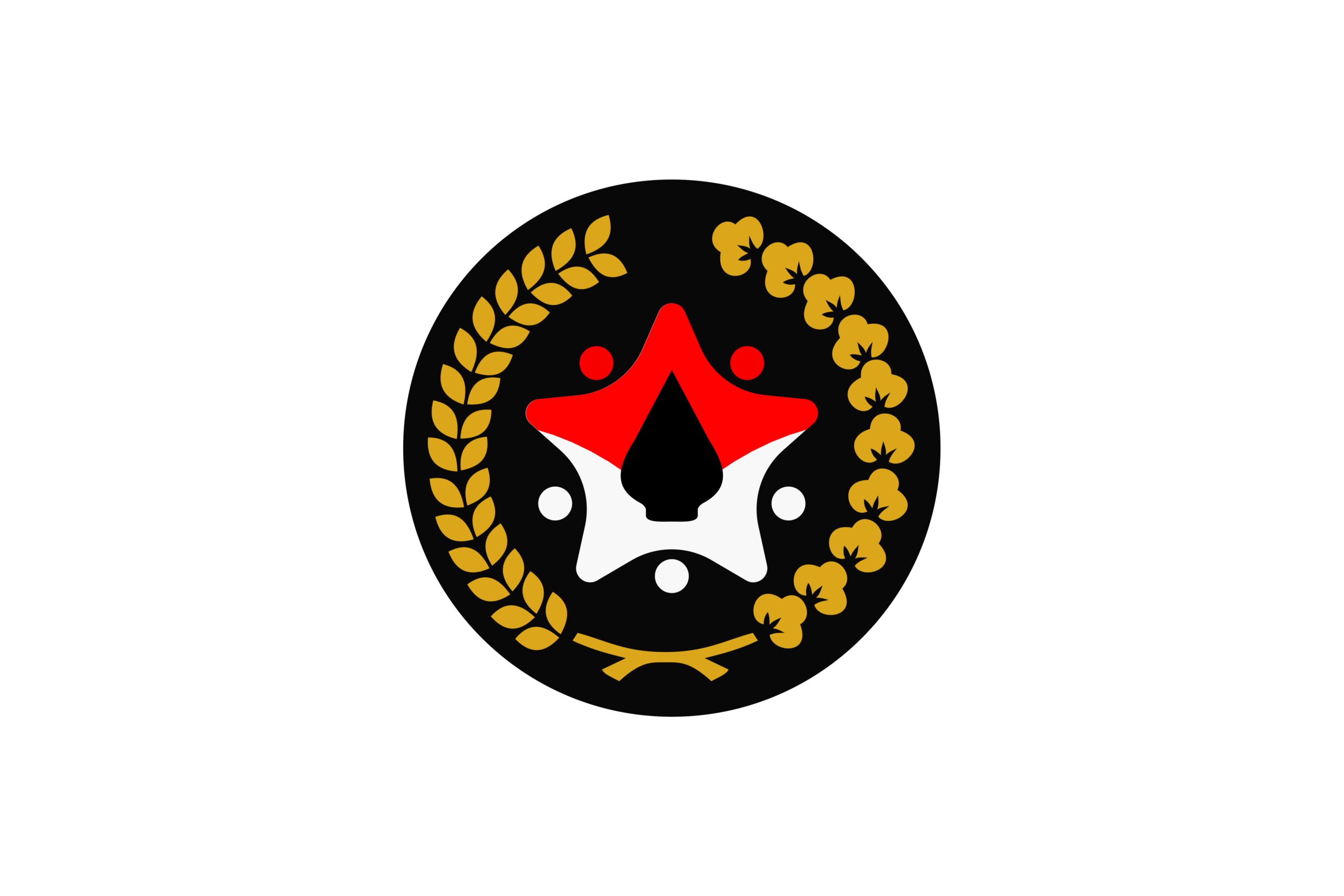
- Flag of the Coordinating Ministry for Human Development and Cultural Affairs

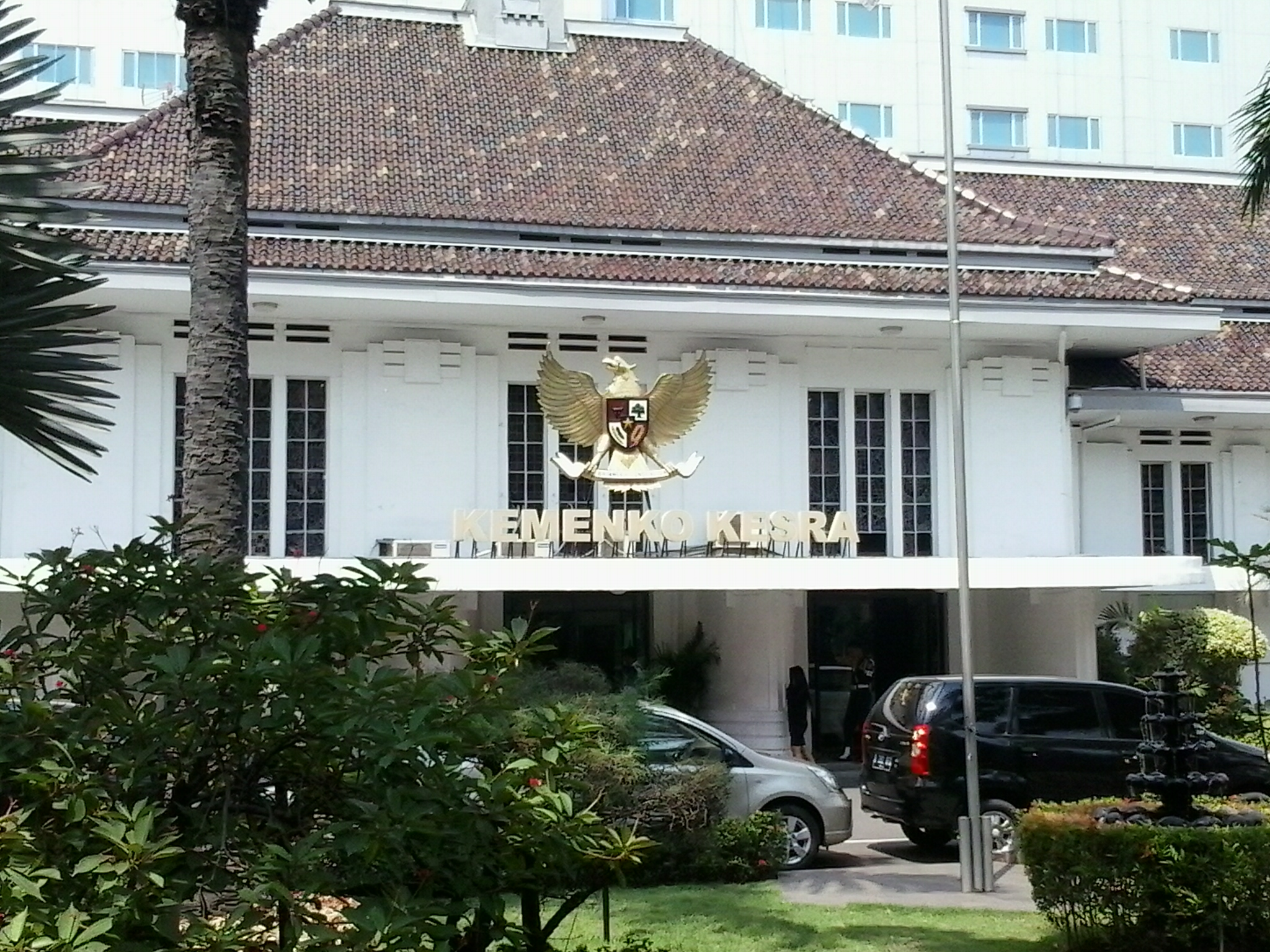
- Coordinating Ministry of Human Developments and Cultural Affairs headquarters

Agency overview
- Formed: 27 October 2014; 11 years ago
- Preceding agency: Coordinating Ministry for Public Welfare
- Jurisdiction: Government of Indonesia
- Headquarters: Jl. Medan Merdeka Barat No. 3 Jakarta Pusat 10110
- Minister responsible: Sugiono, Coordinating Minister
- Website: www.kemenkopmk.go.id

The Coordinating Ministry for Human Development and Cultural Affairs (Note: Indonesian: Kementerian Koordinator Bidang Pembangunan Manusia dan Kebudayaan, abbreviated as Kemenko PMK.) is an Indonesian government coordinating ministry. The ministry is responsible to coordinate, synchronize and control governance in human development and culture. The ministry is currently led by Sugiono, who was appointed on 1 October 2026, succeeding Pratikno.

== Organization ==
Based on the Presidential Decree No. 144/2024 and the Coordinating Ministrer for Human Development and Cultural Affairs Decree No. 4/2024, the Coordinating Ministry for Human Development and Cultural Affairs is organized into the following:

- Office of the Coordinating Minister for Human Development and Cultural Affairs
- Office of the Deputy Coordinating Minister for Human Development and Cultural Affairs
- Coordinating Ministry Secretariat
  - Bureau of Performance Management, Partnerships, and Human Resources
  - Bureau of Law, Organization, and Administration
  - Bureau of Communication and Proceedings
  - Bureau of Digitalization and Information Management
  - Bureau of General Affairs and Finance
  - General Inspectorate
- Deputy for Family and Population Quality Improvement Coordination (Deputy I)
  - Assistant Deputy for Family Resilience and Population Development
  - Assistant Deputy for Child Protection and Child Rights Fulfillment
  - Assistant Deputy for Women's Rights Fulfillment, Women Protection, and Women Empowerment
  - Assistant Deputy for Elderly Welfare and Disabled Welfare
- Deputy for Health Quality Improvement Coordination (Deputy II)
  - Assistant Deputy for the Improvement of Healthcare Access and Service Quality
  - Assistant Deputy for the Improvement of Health Capacity and Health Resilience
  - Assistant Deputy for the Improvement of Healthcare Resources
  - Assistant Deputy for the Nutrition Improvement and Stunting Prevention
- Deputy for Education Quality Improvement Coordination (Deputy III)
  - Assistant Deputy for Early and Primary Education
  - Assistant Deputy for Middle and Higher Education
  - Assistant Deputy for Research, Technology, and Industrial Partnership
  - Assistant Deputy for the Improvement of Human Resources in Education
- Deputy for National Character and Identity Strengthening Coordination (Deputy IV)
  - Assistant Deputy for Character Strengthening
  - Assistant Deputy for Religious Development
  - Assistant Deputy for Youth Empowerment and National Achievements Improvement
  - Assistant Deputy for Cultural Advancement and Conservation
- Deputy for Disaster Management and Social Conflicts Coordination (Deputy V)
  - Assistant Deputy for Disaster Risk Mitigation
  - Assistant Deputy for Disaster Management
  - Assistant Deputy for Rehabilitation and Reconstruction
  - Assistant Deputy for Post-Social Conflict Resolution
- Board of Experts
  - Senior Expert to the Minister on Law and Governmental Administration
  - Senior Expert to the Minister on Sustainability Development
  - Senior Expert to the Minister on Qualified Human Resources
  - Senior Expert to the Minister on Social, Ecology, and Cultural Resilience

== Coordinated agencies ==
Based on the Presidential Decree No. 91/2025, these ministries are placed under the coordinating ministry:

- Ministry of Religious Affairs
- Ministry of Hajj and Umrah
- Ministry of Primary and Secondary Education
- Ministry of Higher Education, Science, and Technology
- Ministry of Culture
- Ministry of Health
- Ministry of Women Empowerment and Child Protection
- Ministry of Population and Family Development
- Ministry of Youth and Sports
