= William Aditya Sarana =

Indonesian politician

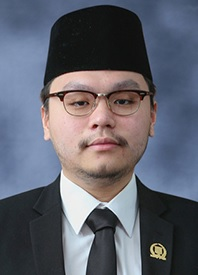
- Official portrait, 2019

Member of Jakarta Regional House of Representatives
- Incumbent
- Assumed office 26 August 2019

Personal details
- Born: 2 May 1996 (age 30) Jakarta, Indonesia
- Party: PSI

William Aditya Sarana (born 2 May 1996) is an Indonesian politician of the Indonesian Solidarity Party who currently serves as a member of the Jakarta Regional House of Representatives. He is head of his party's faction within the legislature.

== Early life ==
Sarana was born on 2 May 1996 in Jakarta. His father is a legal advocate. He is of Chinese Indonesian descent, and is a Protestant. He studied at the Dian Harapan High School in Kalideres, West Jakarta, and later studied law at the University of Indonesia (UI). In 2018, as an UI student, he petitioned the Constitutional Court of Indonesia for a judicial review of the Terrorism Law of 2018, raising concerns over the law's definition of "radicalism". He took part in a student exchange program to the University of Malaya.

== Career ==
Sarana was elected into the Jakarta Regional House of Representatives following the 2019 Indonesian legislative election after winning 12,295 votes, representing the 9th electoral district (Kalideres, Cengkareng, and Tambora districts). According to Sarana, he avoided areas known as bases of support for Anies Baswedan during his campaign due to poor reception there, and instead he focused on areas known to support Basuki Tjahaja Purnama in the 2017 gubernatorial election. When he was sworn in on 26 August 2019, he was 23, making him the youngest member of the legislature. Four days later, on 30 August 2019, he graduated from university.

At the beginning of his tenure, Sarana publicly denounced several unusual items in the annual budget – namely, Rp 82 billion (~USD 6 million) item for glue and Rp 124 billion (~USD 9 million) item for ballpoints. He was later given a reprimand by the legislature's ethical body for violating the budgetary process through the public statement. The municipal government attributed the budget items to an input mistake. Following the departure of PSI's faction head Anggara Wicitra Sastroamidjojo to the National Mandate Party, Sarana became PSI's faction head.

He ran for a second term from the same electoral district in the 2024 legislative election, and was reelected with 39,720 votes, the highest of all candidates. He endorsed Ganjar Pranowo in the 2024 presidential election, while his party supported Prabowo Subianto.
