= Miftah Maulana Habiburrohman =

Indonesian Islamic preacher (born 1981)

Gus Miftah Maulana Habiburrohman
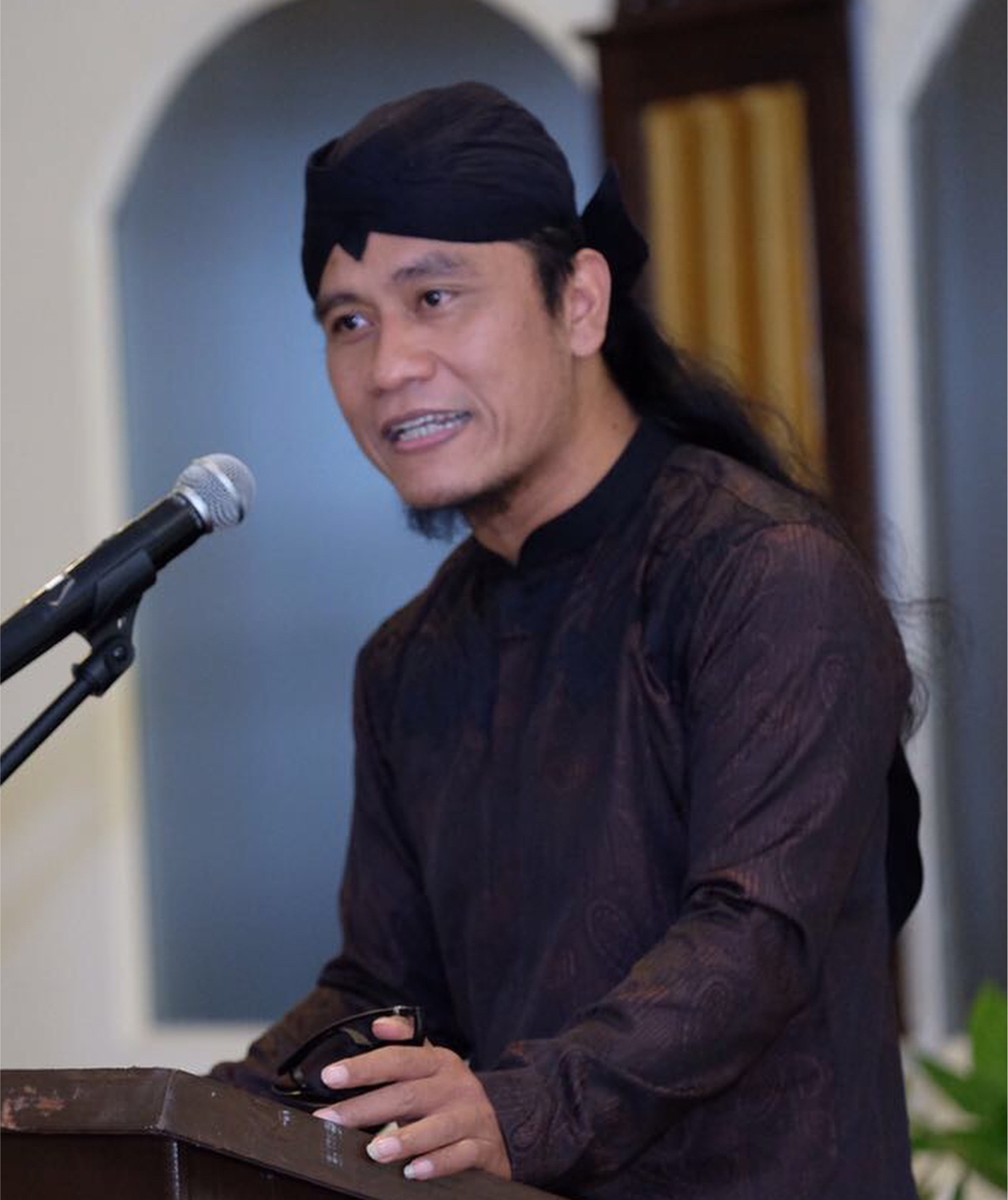
- Miftah in 2019

Envoy to the President for Religious Tolerance and Religious Infrastructure Development
- In office 22 October 2024 – 06 December 2024
- Preceded by: office established
- Succeeded by: office abolished

Personal life
- Born: 5 August 1981 (age 45) Adilihur, Jabung, East Lampung, Indonesia
- Spouse: Ning Astuti (m. 2004)
- Children: 2
- Education: Sultan Agung Islamic University
- Other name: Gus Miftah
- Occupation: Scholar; Ustad

Religious life
- Religion: Islam
- Denomination: Sunni

Miftah Maulana Habiburrohman (born 5 August 1981), also known as Gus Miftah, is a preacher and the leader of the Ora Aji Islamic Boarding School in Sleman. He served as the Special Envoy to the President for Religious Harmony and the Development of Religious Facilities in 2024 before resigning.

Miftah studied at Sunan Kalijaga State Islamic University but did not complete his studies. During his time in college, he was active in the Indonesian Islamic Student Movement (PMII), which is affiliated with Nahdlatul Ulama. In 2023, he completed his bachelor's degree in Islamic Religious Education at the Faculty of Islamic Studies, Sultan Agung Islamic University, Semarang.

As a preacher, Miftah preaches religious teachings to marginalized communities. He began to gain recognition when a video of him delivering a sermon at a nightclub in Bali went viral.

== Paternal lineage ==
His father's name is M. Murodhi bin M. Boniran, and he is a descendant of Kyai Muhammad Ageng Besari, the founder of the Tegalsari Islamic Boarding School in Ponorogo.

== Dawah activities ==
Miftah admitted that the initial idea for preaching to marginalized communities appeared to him when he performed prayers at a small mosque near Pasar Kembang, a red-light district in Yogyakarta. In this area, he began holding regular religious studies attended by nightlife workers. Subsequently, he also preached at nightclubs and "plus-plus" salons.

Miftah found out that nightlife workers face difficulties in accessing religious education. When they wanted to attend religious studies outside, they often became the subject of gossip. On the other hand, there are no religious studies available at their workplaces.

His preaching activities among marginalized communities received support from Luthfi bin Yahya who is from Pekalongan.

== Controversy ==
=== Remarks toward iced tea vendor ===
During a tabligh akbar event held at drh. Soepardi Field in Mungkid on 20 November 2024, Miftah made a joke that was deemed insulting. From the stage, he interacted with an iced tea vendor. He asked, "Es tehmu jik okeh ra?" (Is your iced tea still plenty?). When the vendor nodded, he responded, "Masih? Yo kono didol, goblok!" (Still? Then go sell it, idiot!).

As a Special Envoy to the President, Miftah's behavior sparked widespread criticism from the public. On December 4, the Head of the Presidential Communications Office, Hasan Nasbi, stated that President Prabowo Subianto had reprimanded Miftah through Cabinet Secretary Teddy Indra Wijaya. Miftah visited the iced tea vendor's house on the same day to apologize.

A petition was made on change.org demanding the president remove Miftah from his position as Special Envoy to the President. By the morning of 6 December, 215,161 people had signed the petition. On the same day, Miftah released a statement announcing his resignation as Special Envoy to the President.

== Filmography ==
=== Film ===
Year	Title	Role	Production
2022	Mengejar Surga	Ustaz	Viera Film

Description

Not yet released
- N/A: Not Available

=== TV Show ===
- Jalan Dakwah (BTV)
