= Wahdah Islamiyah =

Islamic organization based in Makassar, South Sulawesi, Indonesia

Wahdah Islamiyah جمعية الوحدة الإسلامية
- Abbreviation: Wahdah
- Formation: late-1980s
- Type: Mass organization
- Headquarters: Makassar, South Sulawesi
- Official language: Bahasa Indonesia
- Leader: Muhammad Zaytun Rasmin
- Affiliations: Sunni Islam (Salafiyyah)
- Website: https://wahdah.or.id/

Wahdah Islamiyah is a Salafi Islamic mass organization (ormas) based in Makassar, South Sulawesi, Indonesia. The organization emerged in the late-1980s and today it owns approximately 120 branches across the archipelago. Wahdah maintains an extensive cadre training system and runs more than 200 schools, including its own higher educational institutions. The organization has a long history of cooperating with the local government through the provision of social welfare and religious education.

== Description ==
Wahdah Islamiyah emerged in the late 1980s when the Salafi Islamic thoughts were gradually imported from the Middle East to Indonesia. The original founders of the organization were linked to Muhammadiyah, but they were dismayed by the organization for being accommodative to the autocratic Suharto regime. These members received scholarships from the Indonesian Islamic Propagation Council (DDII) in the 1990s to pursue religious study in Saudi Arabia. They returned with extensive knowledge of Salafi Islam and a global network of donors and educational institutions.

Wahdah mainly recruits its members from the small religious study circles (halaqah) in the university campuses. As such, members and leaders of Wahdah are predominantly originated from the well-educated middle class. Wahdah appealed to the newly recruited members by arguing the individuals become professional, disciplined, and respectable Muslims by joining the organization. Wahdah invests significant time and resources in the cadre training, based on their idealism of building an individual based on the five M's: Mukmin (piety), Muslih (selflessness), Mujahid (knowledge of Islam), Muta'awin (ability to work with others to build an Islamic society) and Mutqin (professionalism). It also provides religious education based on the Salafi Islamic teaching which is curtailed based on the socio-political environment of Indonesian society.

Wahdah's overseas network of Salafi Islamic movements range from educational institutions such as the Islamic University of Madinah in Saudi Arabia to the NGOs and charitable organizations such as the Al-Turath in Kuwait, Islamic Relief in the United Kingdom, and the Dar al Ber Society in the United Arab Emirates.

Since the reformation and democratization, Wahdah began collaborating with public institutions. This especially accelerated during the Susilo Bambang Yudhoyono presidency whose policies accommodated Islamic groups. Especially Jusuf Kalla, the Vice President of Indonesia from 2004 to 2009, who also hailed from South Sulawesi, provided extensive patronage toward Wahdah Islamiyah. Kalla has delivered a keynote speech in all of Wahdah's past national congresses.

During this time, Wahdah increasingly collaborated with the local government and civil society organizations to provide social welfare, from religious education to police units, counseling to charged drug offenders, distribution of social welfare programs to the remote villages, and blood donation for the International Red Cross.

Wahdah has also built an extensive network of Islamic schools (pesantren). Today the organization runs more than 200 schools, from the elementary level to higher education. Wahdah's higher educational institution, the Higher Learning Facility for Islam and Arabic (Sekolah Tinggi Islam dan Bahasa Arab, STIBA), received a permit for establishment in 2002 and expanded its operation in 2014.

The leaders of Wahdah Islamiyah have often been involved in political lobbying and exerted huge political influence on occasion. For example, the leaders of Wahdah joined activists of other Islamist organizations based in South Sulawesi to form the Preparatory Committee for Upholding Islamic Law (Komite Persiapan Penegakan Syariat Islam, KPPSI). KPPSI lobbied the local government to implement Sharia in the province. The leaders of Wahdah Islamiyah also joined the Aksi Bela Islam (Action for Defending Islam) rally from 2016 to 2017, led by the Islamic Defenders Front (FPI), to denounce the Christian-Chinese governor of Jakarta, Basuki Tjahaja Purnama, for his blasphemy case.
