= Muhammad Luthfi bin Yahya =

Arab Indonesian Islamic sheikh, kyai and preacher

Mawlānā Habib Muhammad Luthfi Ali Yahya
- محمد لطفي علي يحيى
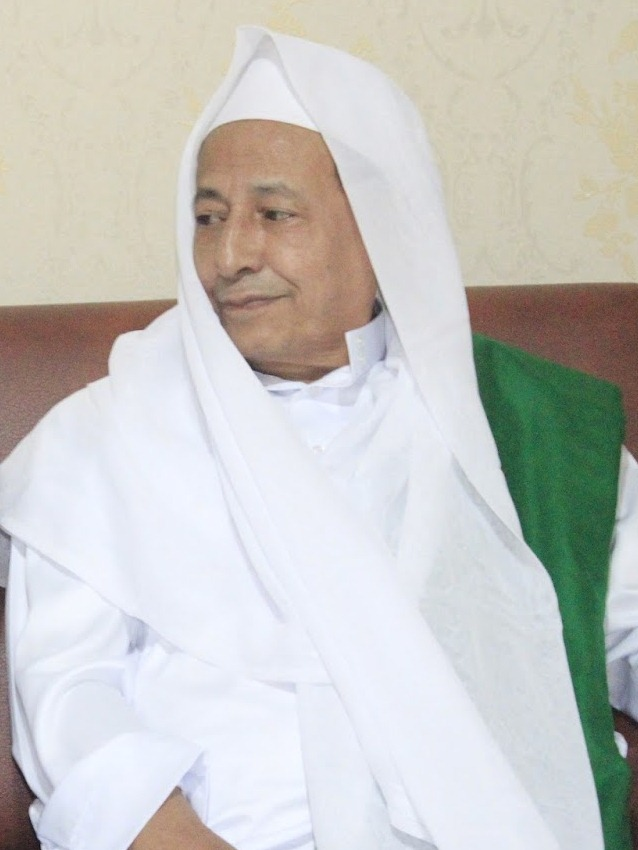
- Luthfi bin Yahya in 2017

National Leader of Jam'iyyah Ahlith Thariqah al-Mu'tabarah an-Nahdliyyah
- Incumbent
- Assumed office February 28, 2000
- Preceded by: Ahmad Muthohar bin Abdurrahman

Member of Presidential Advisory Council of the Republic of Indonesia
- Incumbent
- Assumed office December 13, 2019 Serving with List: Wiranto (chairman); Sidarto Danusubroto; Agung Laksono; Tahir; Putri Kuswisnuwardhani; Mardiono Bakar; Arifin Panigoro; Soekarwo
- President: Joko Widodo

Personal details
- Born: November 10, 1947 (age 78) Pekalongan, Central Java
- Occupation: Chairman of MUI Central Java
- Website: Official website

Maulana Al-Habib Muhammad Luthfi bin Ali bin Yahya (born November 10, 1947), colloquially known as Habib Luthfi, is an Arab Indonesian Islamic sheikh, kyai and preacher from Pekalongan, Central Java, who has served as a member of the Indonesian Presidential Advisory Council since December 2019.

In addition to being a preacher, he leads Ba 'Alawiyya tariqa in Indonesia and chairs the Central Java chapter of the Indonesian Ulema Council. He is regarded as one of the giants among Nahdlatul Ulama (NU), the largest Islamic organization in Indonesia, as he serves as the Ra'is Amm (national chairman) of Jam’iyyah Ahli Thariqah al-Mu’tabarah al-Nahdliyah (the Association of Recognized Sufi Orders), holding authority toward the direction of traditions within the Sufis in Indonesia and its institutions. He is also commonly held as the guardian of Islamic harmony within the framework of Indonesia as a nation-state, taking the leadership of thousands of santris in several madrasahs and pesantrens across the archipelago. In 2017, he is listed among the top 50 group in the annual publication of The 500 Most Influential Muslims.

== Early life ==
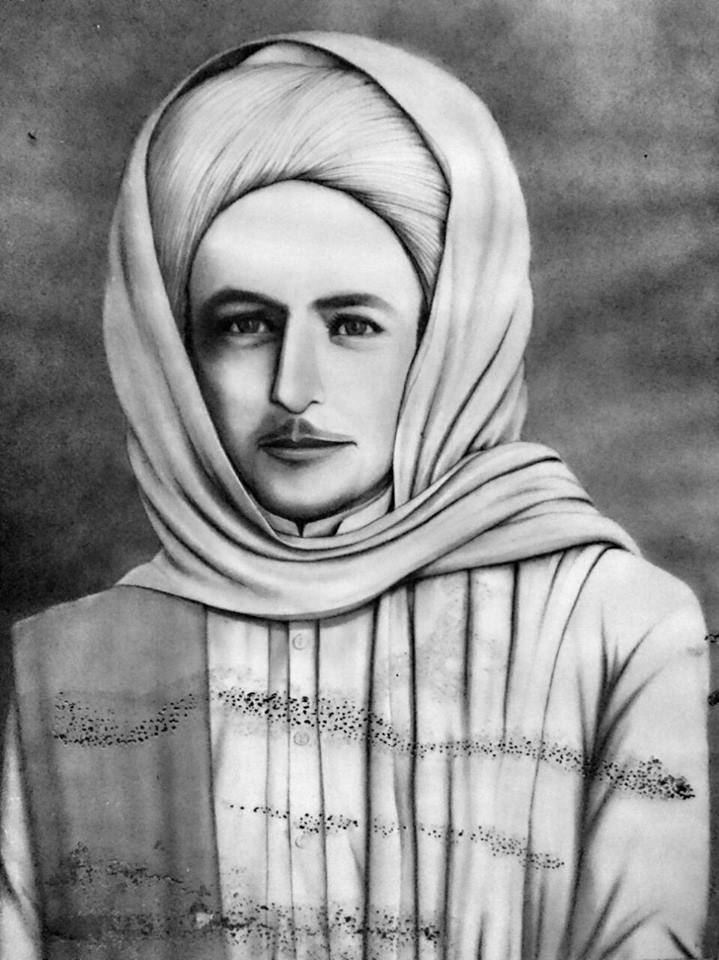
Habib Hasyim bin Yahya, grandfather of Habib Luthfi bin Yahya

Luthfi is a descendant of the group of the prominent Hadhrami Arab family Ba 'Alawi sada which is considered can be traced back to the Islamic prophet Muhammad. He received his first education from the father of the prominent local sheikh Habib al-Hafidz 'Ali al-Ghalib, and then continued his secondary education at the Madrasah Salafiah for three years. He learned the science of Islamic mysticism (tasawwuf) among Naqshbandi and Shadhili tariqas, and obtained the certificate of bay'ah (oath) and the qualification for murshid (educator) under the supervision of Muhammadiyah ulamas. Subsequently, in 1959, he continued his study at the pesantren in Benda Kerep, Cirebon. Following this, he moved to Mecca and Medina, receiving the diploma for several fields of Islamic science including sharia, tariqa, tasawwuf, tafsir and hadith studies.

== Views ==
He takes a syncretic approach toward the innovation and preservation of religious traditions, especially regarding Sufism, and known for implementing Western musical instruments for the religious recital in pesantrens for example.
