= Ali Masykur Musa =

Indonesian politician

Ali Masykur Musa (born September 12, 1962) is an Indonesian politician who serves as current chairman of Central Board of NU's Scholars Association (PP ISNU). He is also current member of the Supreme Audit Agency of the Republic of Indonesia (BPK RI) and appointed as official candidate for chairman of The Working Group on Environmental Auditing (WGEA), under the International Organization of Supreme Audit Institutions (INTOSAI). Ali had close relationship with former president and co-founder of National Awakening Party (PKB), Abdurrahman “Gus Dur” Wahid, and was twice elected as chairman of the party's faction in the House of Representatives in 2002 and 2006.

== Early life and organization ==
Ali Masykur Musa was born on 12 September 1962 in Tulungagung regency of East Java. His parents were Kiyai Hadji Musa Asy’ari, a local priest, and Hadjah Muthmainnah. He was the fourth of 5 children.

After completing high school and Pondok Pesantren (Indonesians' Islamic Boarding School), he attended the International Relations department, Social and Politic Science Faculty of Jember University, East Java. He became active in Indonesian Islamic Student Movement (PMII) and was running for local chairman of Jember regency branch from 1985 to 1986. In 1991, he was elected as chairman of Central Board of PMII. He was also appointed as deputy chairman of GP Ansor, the youth wing of Indonesia's Nahdlatul Ulama (NU), Jember regency branch in 1986. He was elected as Chairman of the Indonesian National Youth Committee (KNPI) from 1999 to 2000. In the Nahdlatul Ulama leadership board (PB NU), he held the position of chairman of Economic Institution department from 2000 to 2005. Since 2012, he serves as chairman of Central Board of NU's Scholars Association (PP ISNU).

== Political career ==
- Member of National Awakening Party (PKB) Faction at the House of Representatives of the Republic of Indonesia (DPR RI) 1999-2001
- Chairman of National Awakening Party (PKB) Faction at the House of Representatives of the Republic of Indonesia (DPR RI) 2002-2003 and 2004-2006
- Secretary of Ad Hoc Committee of the People's Consultative Assembly (PAH I BP MPR) 2000-2003
- Member of Working committee on the Organization of Islamic Conference (OKI) Parliament 2002-2005
- Member of the Indonesian House of Representatives’ Inter-parliamentary Cooperation Committee (BKSAP DPR-RI) 1999-2003
- Member of Commission IX, the House of Representatives (DPR-RI) 1999-2002
- Member of Commission VI, the House of Representatives (DPR-RI) 2002-2003
- Deputy Chairman of Commission IX, the House of Representatives (DPR-RI) 2003-2004
- Deputy Chairman of Commission XI, the House of Representatives (DPR-RI) 2004-2006
- Member of the House Legislative Committee (Baleg DPR-RI) 2005-2009
- Member of Commission XI, the House of Representatives (DPR -RI) 2006-2009
- Member IV of The Supreme Audit Agency of Republic of Indonesia (BPK-RI) 2009-2014
- Chairman of Working Committee INTOSAI WGEA on The Supreme Audit Agency of Republic of Indonesia (BPK-RI) 2013-2016

== Education ==
- Bachelor of Social Sciences (S.Sos.) in International Relations department, Social and Politic Science Faculty (FISIP) of Jember University 1986
- Study-Internship of “Area Studies”, Inter-university Center (PAU), Gadjah Mada University (UGM) 1987
- Study-Internship of “International Relations Method and International Political Economic”, Inter-university Center (PAU), University of Indonesia (UI) 1988
- Master of Humaniora (M.Hum.) in Political Science, University of Indonesia 1998
- Ph.D. (Dr.) in Management of Education, Policy Studies and Budget Politics, Jakarta State University (UNJ) 2007
- Master of Science (M.Si.) in Business Law, Gadjah Mada University (UGM) 2009
- Bachelor of Law (S.H.), Law Faculty of Sahid University (Jakarta) 2010
- Comparative study of state, law, and civics in several countries such as South Korea, China, Japan, Chile, USA, Saudi Arabia, Egypt, Germany, Switzerland, Spain, *Brazil, Argentina, Morocco, Greece, Russia, etc.
