= I Gusti Kompyang Manila =

Indonesian military officer and politician (1942–2025)

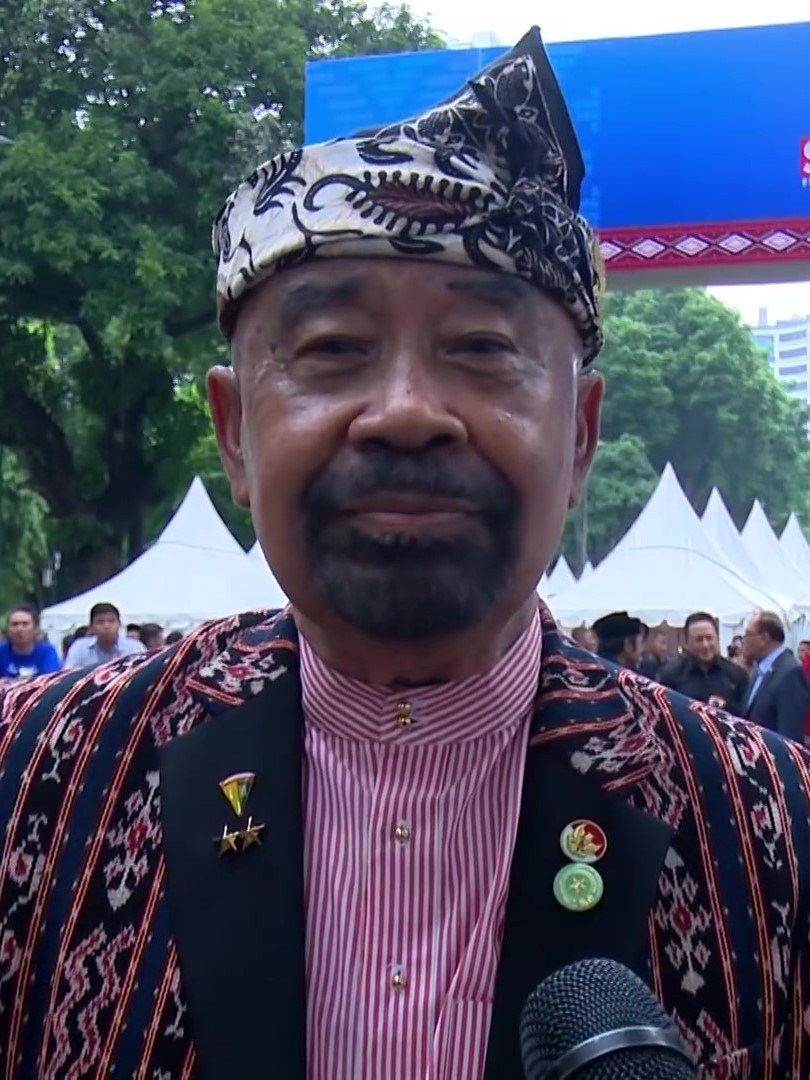
- Manila in 2019

Secretary General of the Department of Information
- In office 15 May 1998 – 1 April 2000
- Minister: Alwi Dahlan; Yunus Yosfiah
- Preceded by: Tonny Soekaton
- Succeeded by: office dissolved

Chairman of the Home Governance College
- In office 21 September 1995 – 1998
- Preceded by: Sartono Hadisumarto
- Succeeded by: Tjahya Supriatna

Personal details
- Born: 8 July 1942 Singaraja, Bali, Japanese-occupied East Indies
- Died: 18 August 2025 (aged 83) Jakarta, Indonesia
- Education: Indonesian Military Academy; General Achmad Yani University

Military service
- Allegiance: Indonesia
- Branch/service: Indonesian Army
- Years of service: 1964–1996
- Rank: Major general
- Unit: Army Military Police Corps

I Gusti Kompyang Manila (8 July 1942 – 18 August 2025) was an Indonesian military officer, civil servant, and politician who served in a number of positions in the Indonesian National Armed Forces and the Government of Indonesia, including as the deputy commander of the Army Military Police Corps, chairman of the Home Governance College, and the final secretary general of the Department of Information. Raised from humble beginnings in Bali, Manila served in the Army Police Corps and played a pivotal role in Operation Ganesha, a landmark mission to relocate wild Sumatran elephants in South Sumatra. As secretary general of the department of information, Manila oversaw its dissolution and the transition to the National Agency for Communication and Information (BIKN). Upon retirement, Manila joined the NasDem Party and held strategic positions within the party.

== Early life and education ==
Manila was born on 8 July 1942 in Kampung Anyar, Singaraja, Bali, as the eldest son of three of I Gusti Ketut Yatra, a police officer, and Ni Jero Taman. At the time of his birth, his father was on duty, and his mother was brought to the nearest hospital by his nephew in the middle of the night. He was named Manila in reference to the fall of Manila to the Imperial Japanese Army during its Philippines campaign, which was widely reported at the time of his birth.

Manila's father, who was on duty in Lombok, died while Manila was three. Following his father's death, Manila's family moved to Gianyar, and by 1949 his mother remarried. His father's family rejected his mother's decision, prompting Manila and his two younger sisters to be brought to Denpasar. Manila was seven years old at that time.

Manila lived in poverty during his elementary school years, and he had to take different jobs in order to pay his tuition. He sold cakes in the morning, and, after school, worked as a ballboy at the Puputan tennis field in Denpasar. Near the evening until night, Manila became an announcer and spread movie pamphlets at the Wisnu theater, a local theater in Denpasar. As he grew up and became stronger, he was promoted as the screen puller in the theater.

Upon completing elementary school, Manila continued his education at the Saraswati Middle School in Taen Siat. Manila learned to ride bicycle at the 2nd grade and, after he was able to ride a bicycle, he worked as a newspaper carrier for the Suara Indonesia daily. He was able to pay his middle school tuition with the money he made as a newspaper carrier. He continued this job after he graduated middle school and continued his education at the Saraswati High School in Kreneng.

Manila finished high school in 1961 and he was recommended by Bali's provincial secretary, Ida Bagus Ketut Rurus, one of his newspaper subscribers, to continue his education at the C basic course (forerunner to the Home Governance Academy) in Lombok. At the same time, he also applied for the Indonesian Military Academy. He was accepted for both and he opted for the military academy. He departed for the academy alongside I Made Kerana (later army financial director), who was the only other applicant from Bali who was accepted.

Manila's work routine during his childhood made him able to overcome hazing and physical challenges in the military academy. He often read books on Mahatma Gandhi, Jawaharlal Nehru, and Sudirman in the academy's library. Shortly before his graduation from the academy, Manila made an oath to circumcise himself after an incident at the academy's pool, in which he was found out by other cadets to be uncircumcised. His action was later followed by his juniors.

Upon graduating from the academy in 1964 at the age of 24, Manila was commissioned as a second lieutenant within the army police corps. He visited Gianyar and reconciled with his mother, which was met with opposition from his relatives, as traditionally his mother was not a part of their family anymore since she had already married another man. Manila rejected this interpretation and, until his mother's death in 2010, spared some of his wages for his mother.

== Career ==
=== Peacekeeping mission ===
From 1977 to 1978, he joined the Garuda Force VII-6 contingent, which was tasked with maintaining peace in the Middle East following the Yom Kippur War. Serving as a liaison officer with the rank of major, he was stationed in the Sinai desert. His duties included overseeing the UNDOF Zone separating Egypt and Israel, ensuring the area remained free of military activity from either side, and inspecting individuals crossing the border.

During a patrol, Manila and his colleagues were caught in a sudden, powerful sandstorm. After enduring the storm for nearly 30 minutes, they found themselves disoriented and lost, with their communication equipment failing. In a moment of despair, they were discovered by a Bedouin man on a camel. Recognizing that they were from Indonesia, the man invited them to his simple tent, where he offered them tea. During their conversation, Manila admired a knife tucked into the man's belt. Upon learning that Manila was a collector of sharp weapons, the man, as a sign of friendship, immediately offered him the knife. Manila, respecting the local tradition, accepted the gift and gave the Bedouin several coins in return. After spending two hours at the camp, they were able to re-establish communication with their headquarters and were picked up by helicopter.

=== Operation Ganesha ===
Manila's most notable military assignment came in late 1982 when he became the chief of the Sriwijaya Regional Military Command's army police with the rank of lieutenant colonel. He was tasked with leading Operation Ganesha (OG), an unprecedented mission to herd hundreds of wild elephants out of the Air Sugihan and Air Saleh swamp forests in South Sumatra. The operation was initiated by the then Minister of Development Supervision and Environment, Emil Salim, and commissioned by the military commander of the Sriwijaya Regional Military Command, Major General Try Sutrisno. With no prior experience or established strategy for such an operation, Manila described the mission as a significant challenge.

The primary objective of Operation Ganesha was to prevent elephants from damaging local settlements and crops without causing them harm. The operation, which lasted for 75 days between October and December 1982, involved a large team of over 300 military personnel, 500-740 transmigrants, and conservation staff. The team's methods included using loud noises and recordings of human shouts, helicopter blades, chainsaws, and TNT explosions to guide the elephants. During the operation, Manila grew a thick mustache and beard, which he later said was a strategy to repel mosquitoes. Following the successful herding of approximately 300 wild elephants, the operation received significant attention from both national and international media. After the operation, Manila remained a vocal advocate for wildlife conservation, particularly for Sumatran elephants.

=== Chairman of the Home Governance College ===
Manila's career rose following the successful Operation Ganesha. He served as the commander of the army police corps education center from 1983 to 1988 and as the deputy commander of the army police corps from 1988 to 1993. On 9 January 1993, he was promoted to the rank of brigadier general with his appointment as the armed forces commander advisor (expert staff). On 21 September 1995, Manila became the chairman of the Home Governance College, Indonesia's civil servant college. His appointment was followed by a promotion to the rank of major general on 1 October 1996.

As the college's chairman, Manila introduced facilities such as billiards hall, fitness center, deer farm, and student shooting club. Despite receiving silent criticism from some alumni, Manila believed these policies were necessary to ensure the students remained "human beings" and not "robots". His leadership, though brief, led to a revolutionary change in the status of the graduating students, who were able to obtain a bachelor's degree and a higher civil servant rank upon graduation, which a significant leap compared to previous generations. However, Manila was also criticized for transforming the college into an increasingly rigid, authoritarian, and heavily militaristic institution, by implementing a curriculum which emphasized military training and the dual-function mentality of the armed forces and enforcing military discipline.

=== Department of Information and BIKN ===
After serving within the army police corps and the Home Governance College, on 15 May 1998 Manila became the secretary general of the Department of Information, replacing Tonny Soekaton from the navy. Six days after his appointment, President Suharto resigned from the presidency and was replaced by B. J. Habibie. Habibie brought press freedom by signing a new press law. News union and observers pressured the government to amend the broadcasting law, including abolishing the role of the department of information to regulate broadcasting.

Demands to amend the broadcasting law significantly weakened the position of the department. From its internal, on 10 June 1999 civil servants of the department of information decided to disband the department's civil servant union, which set a precedent. Manila supported the dissolution, stating that the decision was made democratically. Habibie's predecessor, Abdurrahman Wahid, abolished the department based on the advice from information minister Yunus Yosfiah that the new press law made the information department obsolete. Abdurrahman established the National Agency for Communication and Information (Badan Informasi dan Komunikasi Nasional, BIKN) in its place on 7 December 1999. Manila continued to serve as secretary general until the expiry of his term on 1 April 2000.

As the most senior bureaucrat within the department of information, Manila was designated as the authorizator, or acting head, of the agency. Only half of the information department employees were absorbed into the new agency, while the other half were reassigned to other agencies such as the police, Ministry of Marine and Fisheries, Ministry of Law, armed forces, and the intelligence. Although the agency had a well-defined function on paper, which was to bridge communication between the government and the public, in reality the agency never functioned as expected, as it never had a clear leadership. When President Megawati Soekarnoputri nominated a number of department of information bureaucrats for the agency's head, Manila refused to be nominated as he wanted to focus himself on sports.

Another problem that hindered BIKN was on assets, as 3 billion rupiahs of funds were being held under the Anta Kupa foundation, a welfare fund established by information minister R. Hartono. Manila called for the return of the funds to the former information department employees, but expressed doubt that the money would be recovered, citing the foundation’s private ownership and lack of legal ties to the information department. At the same time, BIKN struggled to trace other missing assets and funds that vanished during the transition, as some assets have reportedly changed hands.

== Later life and death ==
Manila joined the NasDem Party upon its founding and became the chairman of the party in Bali in 2011. In 2013, he was sent to Gorontalo to serve as the acting chairman of the party's branch for three-and-half months in order to resolve internal dispute within the branch which led to thousands of members resigning. Manila was offered to run in the 2014 legislative election, but he rejected the offer, citing regeneration.

In 2017, the chairman of NasDem, Surya Paloh, established the National Defense Academy (Akademi Bela Negara, ABN), which functioned as the party's caderization center. Manila became the academy's governor from its inception and he was responsible for designing and formulating the curriculum.

On 18 August 2025, Manila died at the Bunda Hospital in Menteng, Central Jakarta. His body was laid in state at the ABN campus in Pancoran, South Jakarta, and a cremation ceremony was scheduled for Wednesday morning at the Gatot Soebroto Army Hospital, in accordance with his wishes.

== Bibliography ==
- Angkatan Bersenjata, Indonesia (October 1996), "Daftar Nama Karyawan ABRI yang Naik Pangkat ke dalam Gol Pati Periode 1-10-1996 Vide Keppres RI No. 49/ABRI/1996 Tgl 27-9-1996", Mimbar Kekaryaan, p. 72, archived from the original on 27 February 2023
- Broto, Happy W.; Lopiwudhi, Josep; Bahtiar, Erly (2013), Situmorang, Ian (ed.), IGK Manila: ada surga di telapak kaki ibu : strategi jitu menggiring gajah hingga medali emas SEA Games (in Indonesian), Pustaka Spirit, p. 219, ISBN 9786028367875
- [Dharmasena] (January 1993), "Apapun Bidang Profesinya Kepemimpinan Merupakan Hal yang Amat Penting", Dharmasena (in Indonesian), no. 1, p. 76
- Fazli, Achmad Zulfikar (18 August 2025), "IGK Manila Wafat, Surya Paloh: NasDem Kehilangan Sosok Mentor dan Sahabat" [IGK Manila Passes Away, Surya Paloh: NasDem Lost a Mentor and a Friend], Metrotvnews.com (in Indonesian)
- Khalida, Melalusa Susthira (18 August 2025), NasDem: IGK Manila berkontribusi desain Akademi Bela Negara sejak awal (in Indonesian), ANTARA News
- [Kompas] (23 September 1995), "Sari Berita Sosial-Politik: Mendagri Moh Yogie SM mengatakan, walaupun keduanya dibatasi oleh aturan keorganisasian namun", Kompas (in Indonesian), p. 11
- [Kompas] (16 May 1998). "Sari Berita Sosial-Politik: Empat Pejabat Baru Deppen". Kompas (in Indonesian). p. 3.
- [Kompas] (6 March 2000), "BIKN takkan Tampung Seluruh Karyawan Departemen Penerangan", Kompas (in Indonesian), archived from the original on 28 August 2003
- [Kompas] (27 April 2000), "IGK Manila: Menggiring Gajah dan karyawan Deppen", Kompas (in Indonesian), p. 12
- [Kompas] (20 October 2000), "Tiga Nama Calon Kepala BIKN Diajukan", Kompas (in Indonesian), archived from the original on 19 August 2003
- Lubis, Coki (5 December 2016), Gus Dur Sang Pembela Kebebasan Pers (in Indonesian), Medcom.id
- Mamonto, Wahiyudin (14 February 2013), Igk Manila: Persoalan Nasdem Hanya Dinamika Politik (in Indonesian), ANTARA News Gorontalo
- Masduki (2007), Regulasi Penyiaran: Dari Otoriter ke Liberal (ebook) (in Indonesian), LKiS, p. 116, ISBN 978-979-1283-17-5
- Mastura, Chadijah; Triono, Bambang (20 October 2000), Hartono Disinyalir Menyimpan Dana Karyawan Deppen (in Indonesian), Liputan6.com
- Muhadam (18 August 2025), Mengenang IGK Manila di Lembah Manglayang, Kilasbabel.com
- Paramita, Aloysia Nindya (14 July 2017), DPP NasDem Buka Akademi Bela Negara (in Indonesian), BERNAS.id
- [RMOL] (25 January 2011), IGK Manila Pimpin Nasdem di Bali (in Indonesian), RMOL
- Rozi, Syafuan (2006), Zaman bergerak, birokrasi dirombak: potret birokrasi dan politik di Indonesia (book) (in Indonesian), P2P-LIPI, ISBN 9789792458626
- Subiakto, Henri (15 August 2024), Demokratisasi Penyiaran dan Tantangan Komunikasi di Era Digital (ebook) (in Indonesian), Damera Press, p. 162
- Suryana; Pangkapi, M. Ridwan (July 1999), "Nasib Sekolah Birokrat", Panji Masyarakat, Bandung: Yayasan Nurul Islam
