= National Resilience Institute =

Indonesian government agency

- Lembaga Ketahanan Nasional
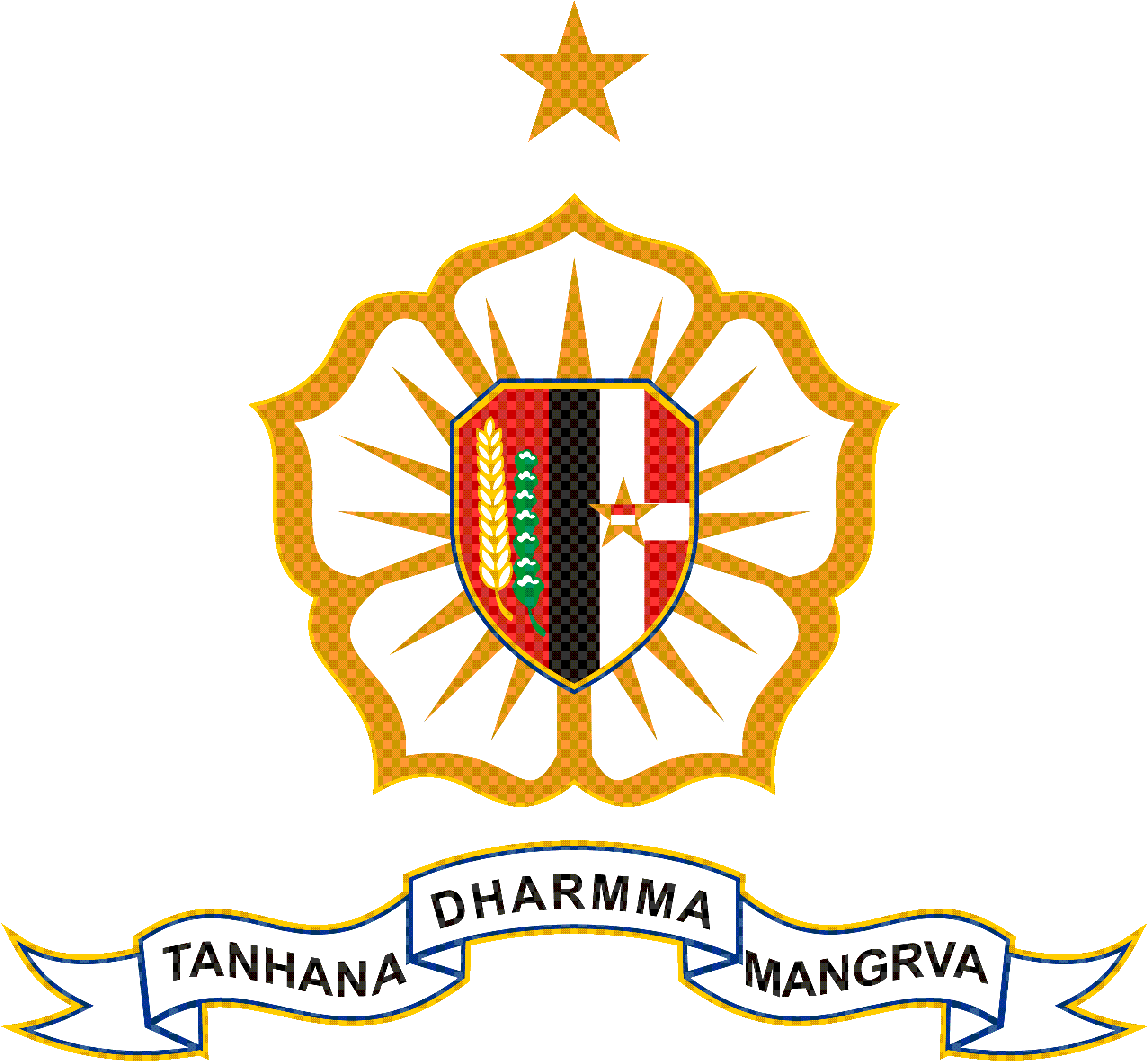
- Emblem of National Resilience Institute

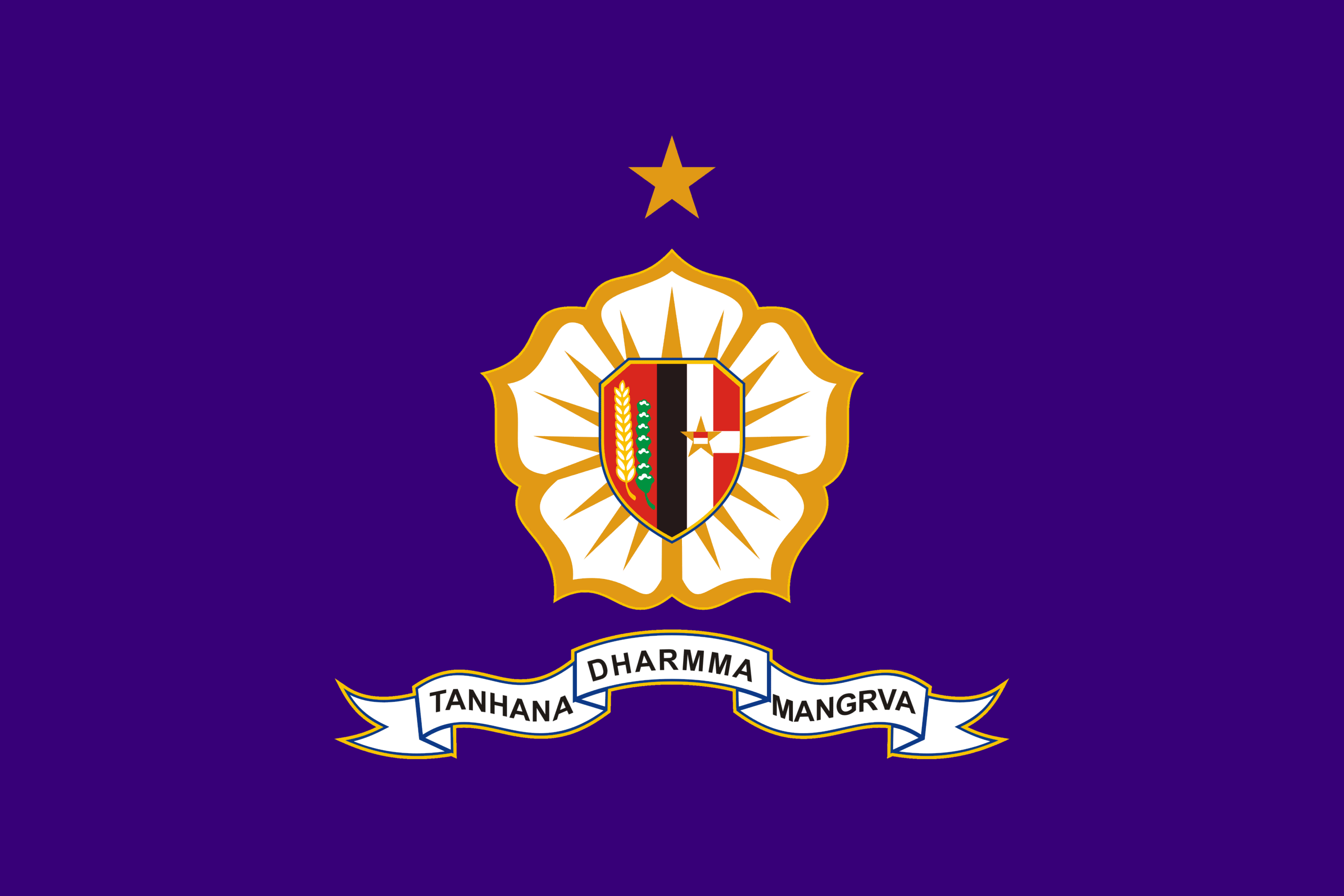
- Flag of the National Resilience Institute

Agency overview
- Formed: 1965
- Jurisdiction: Government of Indonesia
- Headquarters: Jakarta
- Agency executive: Ace Hasan Syadzily, Governor
- Website: www.lemhannas.go.id

National Resilience Institute (Indonesian: Lembaga Ketahanan Nasional, abbreviated as Lemhannas) is an Indonesian non-ministerial government agency tasked with carrying out duties in the field of education for national leaders, strategic assessment of national resilience and the strengthening of national values.

== History ==
The National Defense Institute was established on 20 May 1965, based on Government Regulation No. 37/1964, and is directly under the President. The idea of the formation of the agency is to create an educational institute in defense to prepare and develop future national leaders (civil servants and military officers) in the context of political strategy and national defense.

In 1983, the agency was placed under the Commander of National Armed Forces and became part of the executive agency within the National Armed Forces HQ. In 1994, this agency was renamed the National Resilience Institute and placed directly under the Minister of Defense and Security. In 2001, along with several other agencies, the National Resilience Institute became a non-departmental government agency that directly reports to the President. In 2006, the position of the Governor of the National Resilience Institute is equivalent to the position of the Minister. Since 2016, the National Resilience Institute is regulated by Presidential Decree No. 98/2016 on the Nasional Resilience Institute.

== Tasks and functions ==
According to article 2 of Presidential Decree No. 98/2016 on the Nasional Resilience Institute, Lemhannas has the task of assisting the President in:

- Organize education to prepare cadres and strengthen national-level leaders;
- Carry out a conceptual and strategic study on various national, regional, and international issues required by the President;
- Carry out the consolidation of national values.

Article 3 of Presidential Decree No. 98/2016, stipulates that Lemhannas carries out the following functions:

- Educate, prepare cadres, and strengthen national-level leaders through all business activities and work including educational programs, preparation of educational materials, educational operations, and training of participants and alumni as well as evaluation;
- Examine various national, regional, and international strategic issues in the fields of geography, demography, natural resources, ideology, politics, law and security, economics, social culture, and science as well as international issues;
- Strengthen the national values contained in the preamble to the 1945 Constitution of the Republic of Indonesia as well as the values of Pancasila as the nation's ideology, the spirit of defending the country, the transformation of universal values, the national system, and the cultivation of national values;
- Evaluate and develop the execution of education of national-level leaders;
- Conduct research and measure the national resilience level in Indonesia;
- Execute training and studies in the field of national leadership;
- Postgraduate education cooperation in the field of national resilience strategy with national and/or international educational institutions.
