= Rafly Kande =

Rafli

Member of House of Representatives
- In office 1 October 2019 – 30 September 2024
- Constituency: Aceh I

Senator for Aceh
- In office 1 October 2014 – 1 October 2019

Personal details
- Born: Rafli; 1 August 1967 (age 59) Samadua, Indonesia
- Party: PKS (since 2019)
- Occupation: Singer; Politician
- Other names: Rafly Kande; Kandé

Rafli (born 1 August 1966), better known as Rafly Kande (stylised as Rafly KanDe), is an Acehnese singer and politician, a member of the Prosperous Justice Party (PKS). He served as a member of the House of Representatives from 2019 until 2024.

== Biography ==
Rafli was born in Subarang, a village (desa) in Samadua District, South Aceh Regency, Aceh, to Muhammad Isa and Mansiar. He was active in music since he was six, especially the local Acehnese Islamic music traditions due to his upbringings in a family who were traditional musicians.

=== Musical career ===
From 1988 until 1994, he decided to try popular music styles, especially rock, he often won festival events, one of which is in the Aceh Rock music festival in 1991, where he got first place.

In the late 1990s and early 2000s, Acehnese music was dominated by adaptations of dangdut and Indian music with Acehnese lyrics. Concerned about the lack of creativity in local music, in 1994, Rafli decided to shift away from popular and rock music to focus on more traditional Acehnese music traditions. Dedicated to revitalizing local music, he spent six years developing Acehnese musical identity by mixing tradition with modernity. In 1999, Rafli would release "Aneuk Yatim" (Orphan), this song would gain popularity after the 2004 Indian Ocean tsunami due to its relatability regarding the current situation of Aceh.

In 2000, he formed the KanDe band, a group based on traditional Acehnese music.

=== Political career ===
Before becoming a member of the House of Representatives, Rafli previously served as a member of the Regional Representative Council of the Republic of Indonesia as an independent between 2014 and 2019, representing Aceh. He became a member of PKS in 2019 and earned a seat in the House of Representatives from 2019 until 2024.

In 2024, he ran again under PKS as a candidate for the House of Representatives, but lost to Ghufran.
