= Rustam Effendy Nainggolan =

Indonesian politician (born 1950)

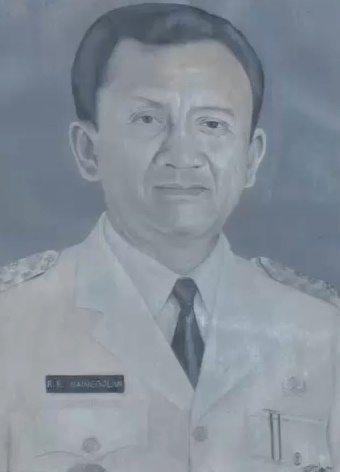

Regent of North Tapanuli
- In office 1994–1999
- Preceded by: Tahan Mangaraja Halomoan Sinaga
- Succeeded by: Torang Lumbantobing

Provincial Secretary of Sumatera Utara
- In office 2008–2010
- President: Susilo Bambang Yudhoyono
- Governor: Syamsul Arifin

Personal details
- Born: November 21, 1950 (age 75) Pematangsiantar, Sumatera Utara, Indonesia
- Spouse: Linda Mariany br. Sihombing
- Children: Septa Glory; Gabriel Renjana; Vera Reni; Gaza Renato
- Education: Universitas Sumatera Utara
- Website: sumutbersatu.com

Dr. Drs. Rustam Effendy Nainggolan, M.M. (born November 21, 1950) in Pematang Siantar, North Sumatera also known as RE Nainggolan is a local government official in North Sumatra, his last position as Provincial Secretary of North Sumatra.

== Career and education ==
He graduated cum laude from the University of North Sumatra (USU) in 2008 in the field of spatial planning, having previously completed a Master of Management (S-2) on the same campus, he is also a graduate of APDN and Institute of Government (IIP), and has attended educational classes of Sepadya, Sepanas, trap Lemhannas.

He was district office staff in Pahae Jae and Siborongborong, Head of Social and Cultural Development Agency, Head of Department of Revenue, Government Affairs Assistant / Ekbang and Head of Planning, all in North Tapanuli, then Sekwilda in Dairi, North Tapanuli regent, as well as the Head of Information and the Head of Planning and last as Province Secretary of North Sumatra.

He reached the highest peak of a career as Provincial Secretary North Sumatra in 2008.

At the end of 2012 RE Nainggolan forward to the election of Governor of North Sumatra (PILGUBSU) as Deputy Governor Candidates accompany Amri Tambunan, North Sumatra Governor Candidates.

== Awards ==
In 2011, RE Nainggolan received the award from Religious Communication Forum as Diversity Leaders of Sumatera Utara, 2007 he received Gold Badges from PGI North Sumatera, charter award from Serikat Perusahaan Pers North Sumatra (2006 and 2007). He has received over 34 awards from the government and various other institutions.
