= Ahmad Bahauddin Nursalim =

Indonesian cleric

Kyai Hajji Ahmad Bahauddin Nursalim
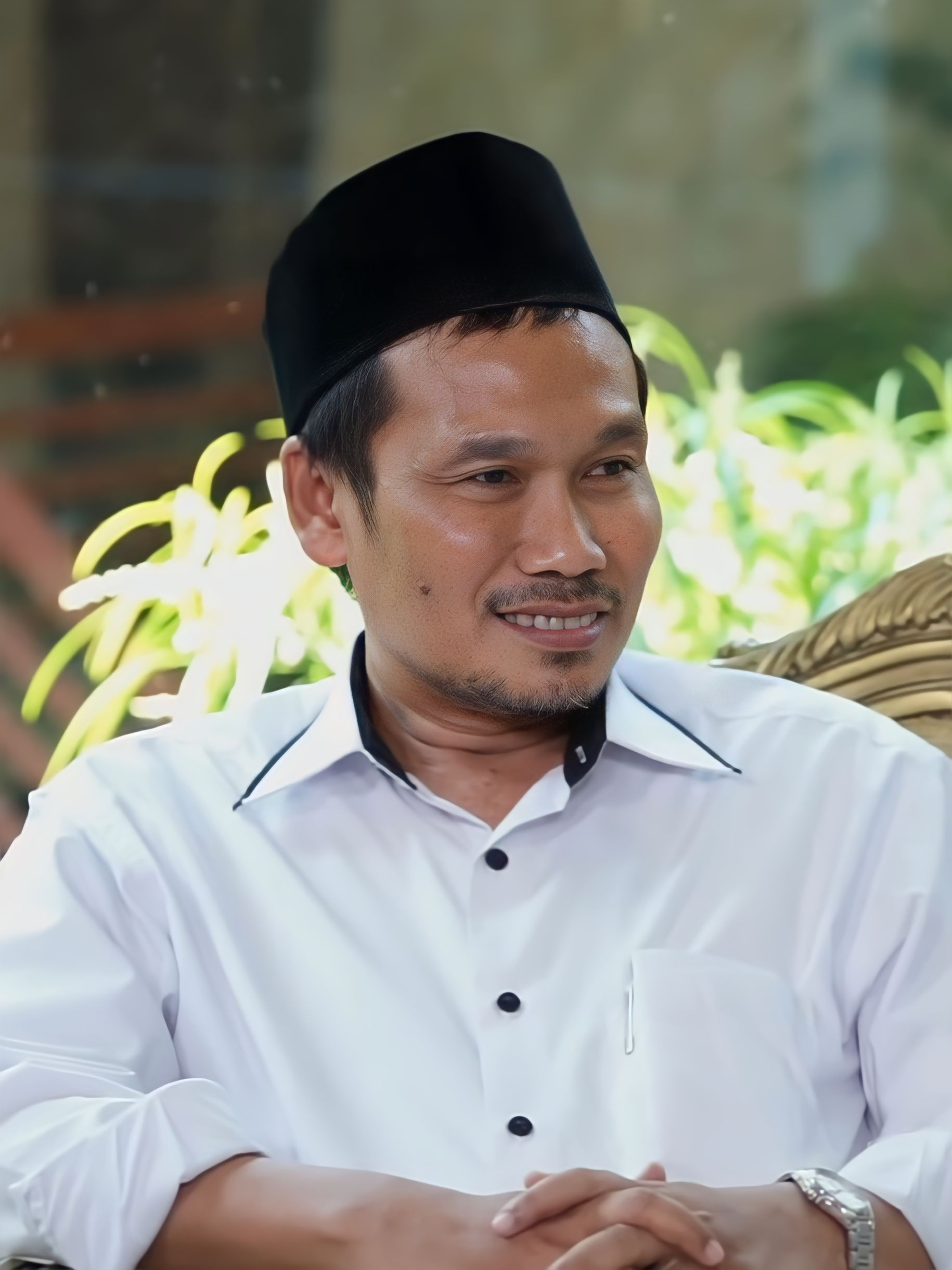
- Nursalim in 2020

Personal life
- Born: Ahmad Bahauddin Nursalim; September 29, 1970 (age 55) Sarang, Rembang Regency, Central Java
- Era: Modern era
- Main interests: Quran; hadith; tafsir; fiqh
- Education: Pondok Pesantren Al-Anwar
- Other name: Gus Baha
- Occupation: Leader of Supreme Council of Nahdlatul Ulama (2022–present)
- Relatives: Nasirul Mahasin (elder brother)

Religious life
- Religion: Islam
- Denomination: Sunni
- Jurisprudence: Shafi‘i
- Creed: Ashʿari

Muslim leader
- Teacher: Maimun Zubair

Ahmad Bahauddin Nursalim (born September 29, 1970) or better known as Gus Baha is a cleric from Rembang Regency, Central Java, who specializes in interpreting the quran.

Gus Baha is the son of a ulama who is an expert in the Qur'an and also the caretaker of the Tahfidzul Qur'an Islamic Boarding School LP3IA, Kiai Nursalim al-Hafizh, from Narukan, Kragan, Rembang. Kiai Nursalim was a santri of Kiai Arwani Kudus and Kiai Abdullah Salam, Kajen, Mergoyoso, Pati. His lineage continues to the great ulama. Along with KH Hamim Jazuli (Gus Miek), Gus Baha started the Jantiko movement (Jamaah Anti Koler) which held roving Al-Quran studies.

Jantiko then changed its name to Mantab (Majelis Nawaitu Topo Broto), then changed to Dzikrul Ghafilin. Sometimes the three are mentioned together: Jantiko-Mantab and Dzikrul Ghafilin.

From his father's family tree, Gus Baha is the 4th generation of Qur'an scholars. While from his mother's family tree, Gus Baha is part of the large Lasem ulama family, from Bani Mbah Abdurrahman Basyeiban or Mbah Sambu.

== Biography ==
He is the leader of Pondok Pesantren Tahfidzul Qur'an LP3IA, Narukan, Kragan, Rembang, since the death of his father, KH. Nursalim, in 2005. In 2022, he was appointed as one of the Rais Syuriyah (Leader of Supreme Council) of Nahdlatul Ulama along with several otherscholars including Nasaruddin Umar, Muhammad Cholil Nafis, Abdul Ghofur Maimoen.
