= Irmawan =

Indonesian politician

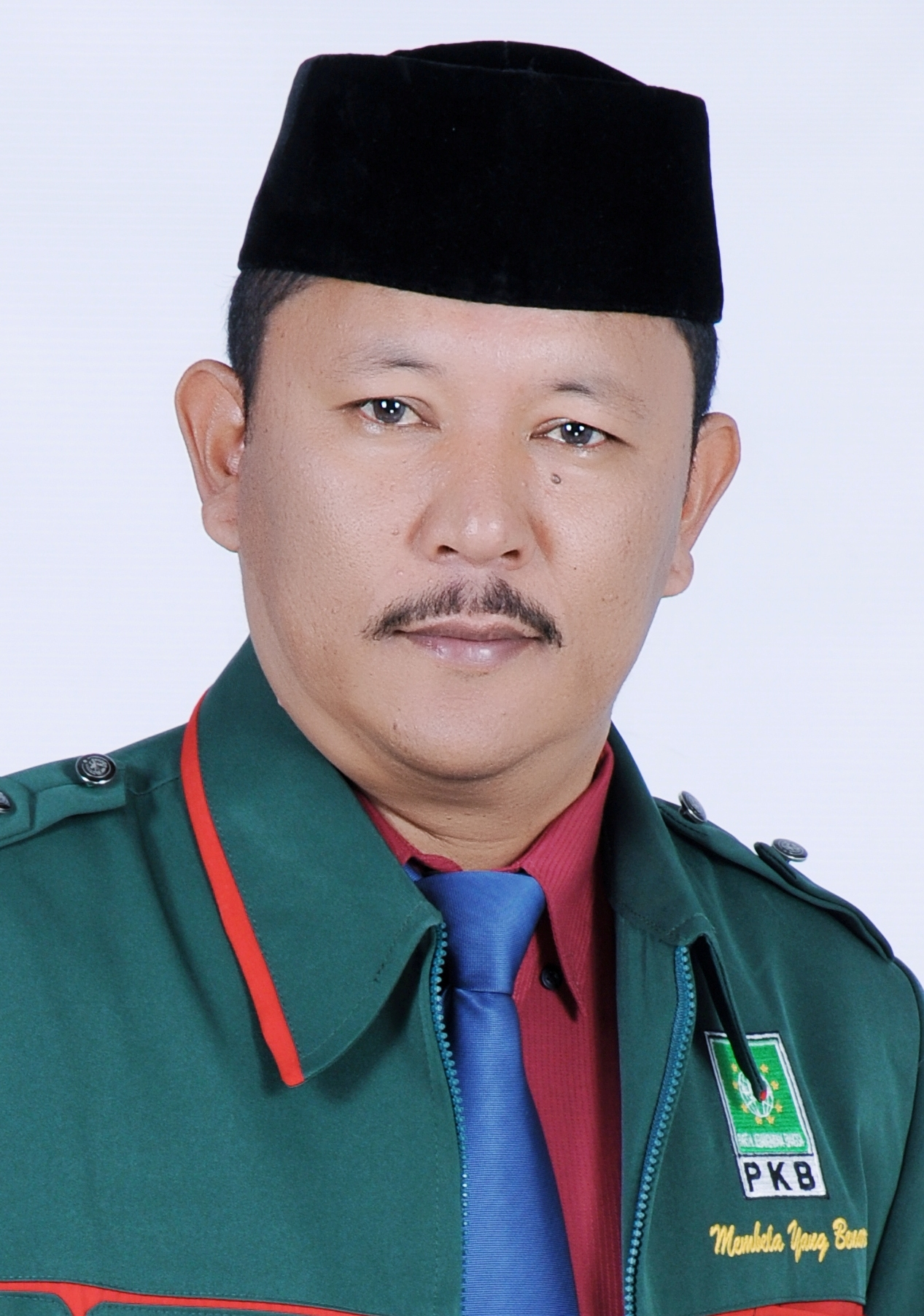

Member of the Indonesian House of Representatives
- Incumbent
- Assumed office 1 October 2014
- Constituency: Aceh I

Member of the Aceh House of Representatives
- In office 2009–2012

Personal details
- Born: Irmawan; 21 December 1967 (age 58) Southeast Aceh Regency, Aceh, Indonesia
- Party: PKB
- Spouse: Ellis Dewi
- Education: Medan Area University (BA Political Science, 2000); (MM, 2003)
- Occupation: Politician, former civil servant

Irmawan is an Indonesian politician and a member of the Indonesian House of Representatives since 2014. He represents the Aceh I constituency, and is currently serving in the DPR's Commission V overseeing infrastructures, transportation, and underdeveloped regions.

A member of the National Awakening Party (PKB), Irmawan is the Chairman of the Aceh PKB Regional Executive Board and also sits on the party's central leadership council as its Secretary of Energy and Natural Resources.

== Early life ==
Born on December 21, 1967, in Southeast Aceh Regency, Aceh, Irmawan is of Gayo ethnicity. He earned his undergraduate degree in Political Science from Medan Area University in 2000, followed by a Master of Management degree in 2003.

Prior to entering politics, Irmawan served as a civil servant for 14 years (1994-2008). He began his bureaucratic career with the Southeast Aceh Regency government, later transferring to the newly established Gayo Lues Regency when it was split off from Southeast Aceh in 2002.

== Political career ==
Irmawan entered politics in 2007 when he ran for regent in Gayo Lues' first regent election but was unsuccessful. In 2008, he ended his civil service career.

In 2009, he was elected to the Aceh House of Representatives as a PKB representative and became Chairman of the PKB Aceh Regional Board the same year.

After three years in the provincial parliament, Irmawan resigned in 2012 to run again for Gayo Lues regent, which was also another unsuccessful bid.

In the 2014 General Election, Irmawan was elected to the Indonesian House of Representatives with 40,191 votes, representing the Aceh I electoral district. He served on Commission III, which handles law, human rights, and security. He served on Commission II in January 2016.

In the 2019 General Election, Irmawan was reelected with 57,289 votes. He joined the PKB Central Executive Board as Secretary of Energy and Natural Resources Division that same year. During his second term, he served on Commission V, which oversees infrastructure, transportation, and underdeveloped regions.

On January 9, 2021, Irmawan was reelected as Chairman of the PKB Aceh Regional Board for a second term. In the 2024 General Election, he was reelected for a third term with 125,234 votes and continues to serve on Commission V.

== Electoral history ==
Election	Legislative body	District	Party	Votes obtained	Result
2014	Indonesian House of Representatives	Aceh I	PKB	40,191	Elected
2019	Indonesian House of Representatives	Aceh I	PKB	57,289	Elected
2024	Indonesian House of Representatives	Aceh I	PKB	125,234	Elected
