= Ministry of Youth and Sports (Indonesia) =

Government ministry of Indonesia

- Kementerian Pemuda dan Olahraga
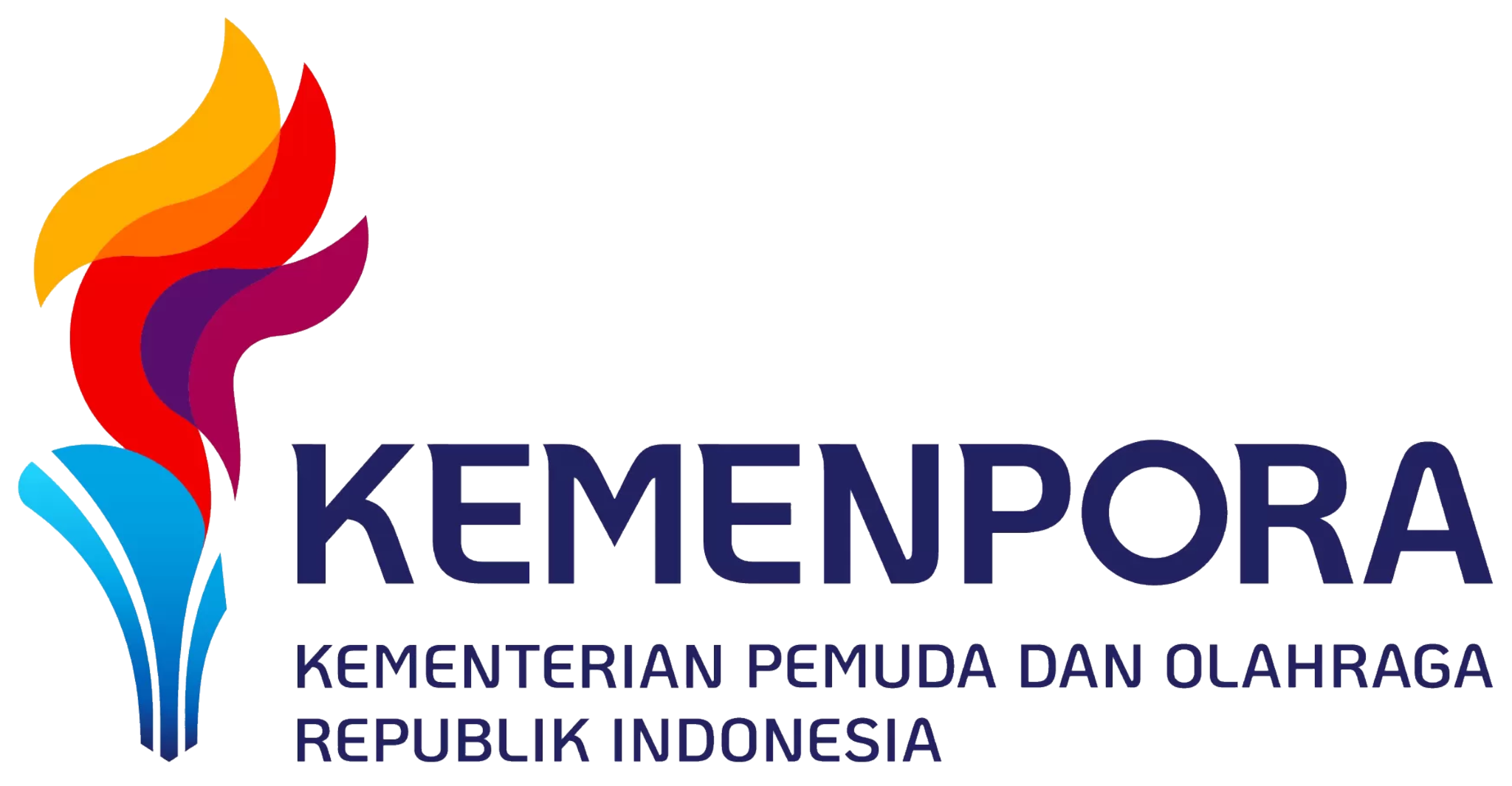

Ministry overview
- Formed: 29 June 1946; 80 years ago
- Jurisdiction: Government of Indonesia
- Minister responsible: Erick Thohir, Minister of Youth and Sports
- Deputy Minister responsible: Taufik Hidayat, Deputy Minister of Youth and Sports
- Website: kemenpora.go.id

The Ministry of Youth and Sports of the Republic of Indonesia (Indonesian: Kementerian Pemuda dan Olahraga; abbreviated as Kemenpora) is a ministry within the Government of Indonesia that oversees youth and sports affairs. The Ministry of Youth and Sports is led by a minister of youth and sports (Menpora) who since September 17, 2025 has been held by Erick Thohir.

== History ==
The institutional milestones that deal with youth and sports development have actually existed since the early days of Indonesian independence. In the first Cabinet structure formed on August 19, 1945. The presidential cabinet had a Ministry of Education led by Minister Ki Hajar Dewantoro. Sports and physical education activities were under the minister of education. The first cabinet, which was less than three months old, was later replaced by the parliamentary Cabinet II under the leadership of Prime Minister Sutan Sjahrir who was inaugurated on November 14, 1945.

In 1999–2004, during the National Unity Cabinet and the Mutual Assistance Cabinet, the Ministry of Youth and Sports was merged into the Ministry of Education and Culture so that youth and sports affairs were only managed by the echelon I structure, namely the Directorate General of Non-Formal Education, Youth, and Sports. When President Susilo Bambang Yudhoyono came to power, the Ministry of Youth and Sports was re-established in 2004.

== Organizational structure ==
According to Presidential Decree No. 187/2024 and as expanded by the Ministry of Youth and Sports Decree No. 1/2025, the organizational structure of the Ministry consists of:

- Office of the Ministry of Youth and Sports
- Office of the Deputy Ministry of Youth and Sports
- Office of Ministry Secretariat
  - Bureau of Planning, Performance Management, and Data
  - Bureau of Public Relations and Protocols
  - Bureau of Human Resources and Organization
  - Bureau of Legal Affairs and Cooperations
  - Bureau of Finance and General Affairs
- Deputy for Youth Services
  - Assistant Deputy for Youth Services Systems and Strategies
  - Assistant Deputy for Central and Regional Fostering for Youth Services
  - Assistant Deputy for Youth and Sports for Business and Private Sectors Fostering for Youth Services
  - Assistant Deputy for Scouting Transformation, Youth Organizations, and Youth Communities
  - Assistant Deputy for Global Youth Development
- Deputy for Sports Culture
  - Assistant Deputy for Educational Sports
  - Assistant Deputy for Youth and Sports for All
  - Assistant Deputy for Sports for Special Needs
  - Assistant Deputy for Sports Culture Development Organization and Personnel
- Deputy for Sports Achievement Improvement
  - Assistant Deputy for Youth Athletes Development Center
  - Assistant Deputy for Elite Athletes Affairs
  - Assistant Deputy for Sports Achievement Organization and Personnel
  - Assistant Deputy for Sports Performance Facilities and Infrastructure
- Deputy for Sports Industry Development
  - Assistant Deputy for Sport Tourism
  - Assistant Deputy for Professional Sports
  - Assistant Deputy for Management of Sports Services, Facilities, and Infrastructure
  - Assistant Deputy for Sports Promotion and Global Partnerships
- Inspectorate
- Board of Experts
  - Senior Expert Staff to the Minister for Youth and Sports Innovation
  - Senior Expert Staff to the Minister for Youth and Sports Regulation
  - Senior Expert Staff to the Minister for Bureaucratic Transformation and Governance
  - Senior Expert Staff to the Minister for Central, Regional, and International Relations
- Special Staffs
  - Special Staff to Minister of Youth and Sports for Public Policy and Communication
  - Special Staff of Minister of Youth and Sports for Legal Affairs and Regulation
  - Special Staff to Minister of Youth and Sports for Planning and Administration
