= Jam'iyyah Ahlith Thariqah al-Mu'tabarah an-Nahdliyyah =

Islamic organization based in Indonesia

JATMAN
- Jam'iyyah Ahlith Thariqah al-Mu'tabarah an-Nahdliyyah
- جمعية أهل الطريقة المعتبرة النهضية
- Logo of JATMAN
- Abbreviation: JATMAN
- Predecessor: Jam'iyyah Ahlith Thariqah al-Mu'tabarah (JATM); Tarekat Nahdlatul Ulama
- Formation: October 10, 1957; 69 years ago (as JATM); June 1979; 47 years ago (current name)
- Founder: Muslih Abdurrahman; Abdul Wahab Hasbullah; Bisri Syansuri; Idham Chalid; Masjkur
- Founded at: Tegalrejo, Magelang Regency
- Type: Religious organization
- Purpose: Tariqa
- Headquarters: Central Jakarta, Jakarta
- Region served: Indonesia
- Members: 40 million (2016)
- National Leader: KH. Achmad Chalwali
- General Chairman: Umar Ahmad Muthohar (acting)
- Secretary General: Mashudi
- Affiliations: Nahdlatul Ulama
- Website: jatman.or.id

Jam'iyyah Ahlith Thariqah al-Mu'tabarah an-Nahdliyyah (JATMAN; Arabic: جمعية أهل الطريقة المعتبرة النهضية, romanized: Jam‘iyyah Ahl al-Ṭarīqah al-Mu‘tabarah al-Nahḍiyyah, English: the Association of Recognized Sufi Orders of Nahdlatul Ulama) is an Indonesian religious organization whose members focus on practicing the teachings of the tariqa.

JATMAN was founded in Tegalrejo, Magelang Regency, on October 10, 1957 under the name Jam'iyyah Ahlith Thariqah al-Mu'tabarah (the Association of Recognized Sufi Orders) by a number of senior tariqa kiai who are all affiliated with Nahdlatul Ulama with the aim for uniting all of al-Ṭarīqah al-Mu‘tabarah (recognized Sufi orders) in order to maintain common interest. With the word al-Ṭarīqah al-Mu‘tabarah it means that the tariqa concerned observes the shari'a and included in the creed of Sunni Islam, and must have a legal silsila, that is continuous until the Islamic prophet Muhammad himself. Thus Jam'iyyah wanted to distinguish himself clearly from the kebatinan and other syncretistic mysticism movements, which were not included in Sunni.
