= Opinion polling for the 2024 Indonesian legislative election =

This page lists public opinion polls conducted for the 2024 Indonesian legislative election, which will be held on or before 14 February 2024.

== Opinion polls ==
=== Polling graph ===
This graph shows the polling trends in the run-up to the 2024 Indonesian legislative election. Scenario polls are not included.

The electoral threshold to obtain seats is currently set at 4%.

=== 2024 ===
Date	Polling firm	Sample size	Margin of Error	PDIP	Gerindra	Golkar	PKB	NasDem	PKS	Demokrat	PAN	PPP	PSI	Hanura	Ummat	PB	Perindo	Gelora	PBB	Garuda	Lead
14 February 2024	Election results			16.72%	13.22%	15.29%	10.62%	9.66%	8.42%	7.43%	7.24%	3.87%	2.81%	0.72%	0.42%	0.64%	1.29%	0.84%	0.32%	0.27%	1.43%
4-9 February 2024	LSN	1,200	2.83%	16.8%	20.9%	10.2%	8.1%	8.3%	8.9%	7.9%	4.3%	3.4%	4.1%	-	-	-	2.5%	-	-	-	4.1%
3-7 February 2024	Polstat	1,200	2.83%	16.5%	20.9%	9.8%	7.8%	7.9%	8.9%	6.8%	4.2%	3.4%	4.1%	-	-	-	2.9%	-	-	-	4.4%
3-6 February 2024	Puspoll Indonesia	1,175	2.85%	21.5%	17.4%	10.8%	7.8%	6.1%	6.8%	4.2%	4.3%	4.0%	1.8%	0.4%	0.2%	0.1%	2.4%	0.1%	0.6%	0.0%	4.1%
30 January - 4 February 2024	Median	1,100	2.95%	19.2%	20.4%	10.0%	9.0%	7.1%	5.8%	4.3%	4.2%	1.2%	4.2%	0.5%	0.2%	0.5%	0.5%	4.0%	0.4%	0.1%	1.2%
28 January - 4 February 2024	Indikator	1,200	2.9%	19.6%	17.2%	12.1%	9.5%	6.7%	7.9%	6.9%	6.4%	2.2%	2.0%	0.3%	0.3%	0.1%	1.2%	0.4%	0.2%	0.1%	2.4%
27 January - 3 February 2024	Populi Center	1,500	2.53%	17.4%	16.0%	11.7%	9.5%	5.1%	6.9%	6.4%	6.3%	2.3%	-	-	-	-	-	-	-	-	1.4%
27 January - 2 February 2024	Poltracking	1,220	2.9%	16.4%	18.1%	10.1%	9.3%	7.1%	8.3%	6.6%	6.5%	3.7%	3.4%	0.7%	0.2%	0.1%	2.0%	0.4%	0.5%	0.1%	1.7%
26 January - 1 February 2024	ICRC	1,230	2.79%	21.1%	18.1%	9.8%	8.0%	8.6%	7.1%	5.0%	4.8%	4.1%	3.1%	-	-	-	4.3%	-	-	-	3.0%
28-31 January 2024	SPIN	1,200	2.8%	18.9%	21.8%	9.7%	7.3%	7.0%	5.1%	5.0%	4.0%	3.0%	4.0%	0.1%	0.1%	0.1%	2.1%	3.6%	2.1%	0.1%	2.9%
25-31 January 2024	JRC	1,200	2.9%	16.7%	22.5%	9.8%	8.4%	5.0%	5.2%	5.2%	4.8%	2.6%	4.7%	0.6%	0.3%	0.0%	1.5%	0.8%	0.4%	0.1%	5.8%
26-28 January 2024	Point Indonesia	1,500	2.53%	14.9%	22.3%	11.3%	6.7%	8.1%	7.3%	7.8%	4.0%	3.0%	3.0%	0.7%	0.1%	0.1%	-	1.8%	1.7%	0.6%	7.4%
21-25 January 2024	PWS	1,200	2.83%	18.5%	21.8%	10.2%	8.7%	7.8%	8.1%	8.5%	4.1%	3.2%	3.5%	1.4%							3.3%
20-25 January 2024	DRA	1,200	2.9%	17.8%	20.6%	8.5%	7.8%	4.7%	5.1%	5.0%	4.6%	2.5%	4.3%	0.3%	0.1%	0.0%	1.3%	0.6%	0.4%	0.1%	2.8%
13-21 January 2024	SDI	1,240	2.78%	15.7%	27.2%	8.6%	7.3%	9.8%	8.3%	2.5%	-	0.8%	1.3%	0.2%	0.2%	0.2%	4.5%	0.1%	0.2%	0.2%	11.5%
14-20 January 2024	SPI	1,200	TBD	21.1%	20.6%	9.2%	7.2%	5.8%	7.1%	4.7%	4.6%	-	-	-	-	-	4.5%	-	-	-	0.5%
15-16 January 2024	SPI	1,219	2.9%	18.1%	18.4%	11.0%	7.3%	Missing	6.5%	5.7%	-	-	-	-	-	-	-	-	-	-	0.3%
9-15 January 2024	EPI Center	1,200	2.9%	16.4%	18.9%	10.5%	7.3%	4.8%	5.2%	5.6%	4.6%	2.7%	4.2%	0.6%	0.3%	0.0%	1.5%	0.4%	-	0.2%	2.5%
8-14 January 2024	SPIN	2,178	2.1%	19.7%	21.1%	10.1%	7.2%	5.8%	6.9%	8.4%	4.1%	2.2%	3.8%	0.2%	0.2%	0.1%	1.1%	2.0%	-	0.1%	2.1%
7-13 January 2024	IPS	1,220	2.8%	18.8%	22.1%	9.8%	7.8%	8.5%	6.7%	9.4%	3.8%	3.3%	3.5%	-	-	-	3.3%	-	-	-	3.3%
10-11 January 2024	LSI	1,206	2.9%	20.4%	20.8%	11.5%	9.0%	5.6%	6.1%	4.8%	4.7%	2.3%	2.2%	0.3%	0.2%	0.2%	1.2%	0.4%	0.2%	0.1%	0.4%
4-11 January 2024	Charta PolitikaCenter	1,220	2.82%	22.6%	18.8%	9.3%	8.0%	8.8%	6.8%	3.9%	4.0%	3.6%	1.9%	0.6%	0.1%	0.2%	2.8%	0.3%	0.3%	-	3.8%
1-7 January 2024	Poltracking	1,220	2.9%	20.1%	19.9%	10.7%	9.9%	8.1%	7.5%	5.0%	4.7%	2.9%	2.0%	0.8%	0.1%	0.1%	1.3%	0.3%	-	0.1%	0.2%
30 December 2023 - 6 January 2024	Indikator	1,200	2.0%	20.0%	18.1%	11.2%	9.1%	6.9%	6.2%	4.6%	4.2%	2.8%	1.4%	0.4%	0.4%	0.1%	0.9%	0.3%	-	0.0%	1.9%
27 December 2023 - 5 January 2024	IPSOS	2,000	2.19%	21.0%	27.0%	8.0%	7.0%	6.0%	7.0%	3.0%	4.0%	1.0%	1.0%	-	-	-	-	-	-	-	6.0%
28 December 2023 - 2 January 2024	LSN	1,420	2.6%	18.5%	20.3%	10.2%	8.9%	7.5%	7.9%	8.7%	4.1%	3.2%	3.1%	2.1%							1.8%
23 December 2023 - 2 January 2024	IndexPolitica	2,300	5.0%	13.95%	15.29%	12.21%	7.24%	5.88%	6.56%	10.54%	3.88%	3.08%	3.75%	1.00%	0.01%	0.01%	3.39%	0.90%	-	0.45%	1.34%
23 December 2023 - 2 January 2024	IndexPolitica	2,300	5.0%	15.62%	17.12%	13.67%	8.11%	6.58%	7.35%	11.80%	4.35%	3.45%	4.20%	1.12%	0.01%	0.01%	3.80%	1.01%	-	0.50%	1.50%
17 April 2019	Election results			19.33%	12.57%	12.31%	9.69%	9.05%	8.21%	7.77%	6.84%	4.52%	1.89%	1.54%	-	-	2.67%	-	0.79%	0.5%	6.76%

=== 2023 ===
Date	Polling firm	Sample size	Margin of Error	PDIP	Gerindra	Golkar	PKB	NasDem	PKS	Demokrat	PAN	PPP	PSI	Hanura	Ummat	PB	Perindo	Gelora	Garuda	Lead
20-27 December 2023	PRC	1,200	2.7%	17.7%	14.2%	13.2%	11.1%	8.8%	10.3%	4.8%	4.1%	2.4%	1.6%	0.4%	0.5%	0.2%	0.5%	0.3%	-	3.5%
23–24 December 2023	Indikator	1,217	2.9%	19.1%	18.2%	9.3%	7.8%	6.2%	6.0%	4.4%	4.5%	2.8%	2.4%	0.4%	0.8%	0.2%	1.7%	0.3%	0.2%	0.9%
13–18 December 2023	CSIS	1,300	2.7%	16.4%	14.6%	11.9%	9.2%	6.4%	11.8%	4.8%	5.2%	3.5%	1.3%	0.5%	0.1%	-	1.5%	0.4%	0.1%	1.8%
1–7 December 2023	Indometer	1,200	2.98%	16.6%	18.5%	10.8%	7.5%	2.5%	4.1%	6.8%	3.2%	2.0%	6.5%	0.4%	0.5%	0.0%	1.5%	1.4%	0.2%	1.9%
29 November-4 December 2023	Litbang Kompas	1,364	2.65%	18.3%	21.9%	8.0%	7.4%	4.9%	4.5%	4.5%	4.2%	2.4%	2.6%	4%						3.6%
20 November–3 December 2023	LSI	1,200	2.9%	19.3%	19.5%	11.6%	7.7%	5.8%	7.3%	3.6%	3.3%	2.9%	1.5%	1.0%	0.1%	0.2%	1.0%	0.3%	0.0%	0.2%
29 October-5 November 2023	Populi Center	1,200	2.83%	18.1%	15.2%	10.7%	9.1%	4.8%	6.4%	4.8%	5.4%	3.6%	2.3%	0.8%	0.3%	0.1%	1.6%	0.2%	0.2%	2.9%
31 October-3 November 2023	SMRC	1,201	2.9%	19.5%	18.7%	12.1%	Missing	5.7%	5.6%	4.0%	4.1%	3.1%	2.3%	0.8%	1.3%	-	1.6%	0.4%	0.2%	0.8%
28 October-3 November 2023	Poltracking	1,220	2.9%	23.0%	18.1%	8.8%	8.4%	8.3%	6.5%	5.1%	4.8%	3.2%	1.8%	0.7%	0.1%	0.1%	2.1%	0.1%	0.3%	4.9%
26-31 October 2023	Charta Politika	2,400	2.0%	26.3%	17.8%	8.1%	7.9%	7.6%	6.9%	3.8%	3.1%	3.4%	1.6%	3%						6.4%
25-28 October 2023	Polling Institute	1,207	TBA	22.2%	15.8%	8.1%	5.1%	4.3%	6.6%	4.3%	4.0%	-	1.6%	-	-	-	-	-	-	6.4%
16-20 October 2023	IPI	2,567	1.97%	25.2%	14.5%	9.4%	7.6%	6.8%	5.7%	4.4%	4.5%	2.7%	0.9%	0.2%	0.2%	0.1%	1.6%	0.2%	0.0%	10.7%
16-18 October 2023	LSI	1,229	2.9%	23.0%	17.1%	7.4%	6.3%	5.2%	6.4%	4.3%	4.1%	2.5%	1.0%	0.6%	1.2%	0.2%	2.4%	0.3%	0.3%	5.9%
2-10 October 2023	Indikator Politik	1,200	2.9%	22.3%	16.9%	9.1%	8.1%	6.9%	5.7%	4.3%	4.5%	3.2%	1.0%	0.3%	0.1%	0.1%	1.8%	0.2%	0.1%	5.4%
2-8 October 2023	LSI	1,620	2.5%	26.1%	14.4%	9.7%	7.6%	7.0%	6.0%	4.3%	4.2%	2.5%	0.8%	0.4%	0.2%	0.0%	1.3%	0.2%	0.3%	11.7%
1-3 October 2023	Polling Institute	TBA	2.9%	23.1%	14.0%	7.1%	5.7%	4.4%	4.0%	6.7%	5.4%	2.7%	3.5%	0.7%	1.0%	0.0%	2.9%	0.4%	0.0%	9.1%
1 October 2023	IPI	4,090	TBA	26.0%	12.6%	9.2%	7.5%	4.8%	5.2%	5.1%	4.5%	2.4%	0.8%	0.3%	0.0%	0.1%	1.9%	0.2%	0.3%	13.4%
20-30 September 2023	LSN	1,420	2.6%	19.8%	17.2%	10.0%	7.9%	8.5%	7.6%	10.1%	4.3%	2.3%	2.1%	0.4%	0.8%	-	4.2%	1.1%	-	2.6%
25 September 2023	Kaesang Pangarep is appointed as Chairman of PSI																			
13-23 September 2023	Republic Institute	2,010	2.19%	23.4%	15.3%	8.7%	10.0%	7.2%	6.0%	11.8%	3.2%	1.5%	0.6%	0.4%	0.2%	0.2%	0.6%	0.2%	0.2%	8.1%
18-20 September 2023	LSI	1,206	2.9%	23.4%	15.7%	7.3%	5.8%	4.1%	5.0%	4.2%	4.0%	2.4%	1.1%	0.5%	1.0%	0.1%	2.6%	0.2%	0.2%	7.7%
3-9 September 2023	Poltracking	1,220	2.9%	24.4%	16.7%	10.1%	9.3%	9.1%	5.3%	6.9%	4.3%	3.3%	0.3%	0.1%	0.2%	0.1%	2.0%	0.1%	0.1%	7.7%
1-7 September 2023	Voxpopuli	1,200	2.9%	17.4%	17.0%	8.1%	7.6%	2.4%	4.2%	6.3%	2.7%	2.5%	6.0%	0.2%	0.6%	0.0%	1.8%	1.0%	0.0%	0.4%
25 August-3 September 2023	CPSC	4,090	2.9%	26.0%	12.6%	9.2%	7.5%	4.8%	5.2%	5.1%	4.6%	2.4%	0.8%	0.3%	0.0%	0.1%	1.9%	0.2%	0.3%	13.4%
21-27 August 2023	CPSC	1,200	2.9%	17.3%	16.8%	8.6%	7.0%	2.3%	4.2%	6.3%	2.7%	2.4%	6.0%	0.2%	0.6%	0.0%	1.8%	1.1%	0.0%	0.5%
21-25 August 2023	Polling Institute	1,201	2.9%	25.7%	15.2%	9.0%	5.2%	4.6%	6.2%	6.8%	3.9%	1.9%	0.8%	0.5%	0.4%	0.3%	1.9%	0.1%	0.2%	10.5%
14-24 August 2023	LSJ	1,200	2.83%	19.2%	17.5%	10.9%	7.9%	9.2%	7.7%	9.9%	3.1%	2.1%	3.9%							1.7%
13-20 August 2023	PWS	1,200	2.83%	19.2%	17.5%	11.3%	7.8%	9.1%	7.2%	8.9%	3.4%	2.1%	1.3%	-	0.8%	-	4.9%	1.1%	-	1.7%
3-9 August 2023	LSI	1,220	2.9%	25.4%	13.0%	9.3%	7.6%	5.0%	5.2%	6.6%	4.2%	2.5%	0.4%	0.5%	0.2%	0.3%	1.9%	0.1%	0.2%	12.4%
1-8 August 2023	LSI	1,200	2.9%	23.2%	15.7%	12.7%	6.6%	5.6%	5.6%	3.3%	5.0%	2.0%	-	-	-	-	-	-	-	7.5%
27 July-7 August 2023	Litbang	1,364	2.65%	24.4%	18.9%	7.2%	7.6%	5.9%	6.3%	7.0%	3.4%	1.6%	0.8%	0.8%	0.2%	0.1%	3.4%	0.4%	0.5%	5.5%
24 July-2 August 2023	Voxpol	1,200	2.83%	22.6%	25.7%	4.3%	6.0%	7.6%	8.5%	4.2%	2.5%	1.6%	0.3%	0.7%	0.3%	0.2%	2.4%	0.7%	0.2%	3.1%
15-25 July 2023	SPIN	1,230	2.8%	20.1%	19.5%	10.5%	9.0%	4.3%	5.9%	10.0%	4.1%	2.1%	0.5%	0.6%	0.4%	0.2%	4.1%	0.5%	0.1%	0.6%
15-21 July 2023	Indikator	1,811	2.35%	24.7%	12.3%	10.7%	8.0%	5.0%	5.3%	6.9%	4.3%	2.7%	0.6%	0.5%	0.1%	0.2%	1.6%	0.2%	0.1%	12.4%
10-19 July 2023	LSN	1,420	2.6%	19.2%	17.1%	9.6%	7.9%	9.8%	7.7%	10.1%	3.5%	2.3%	-	-	-	-	5.2%	-	-	2.1%
1-8 July 2023	LSI	1,241	2.8%	23.7%	14.2%	6.0%	5.7%	5.5%	6.2%	4.4%	2.5%	2.5%	0.9%	0.5%	0.3%	0.3%	4.1%	0.3%	0.7%	9.5%
20-24 June 2023	IPI	1,220	2.9%	25.3%	13.6%	9.2%	7.0%	5.0%	5.2%	6.5%	3.1%	2.8%	0.2%	0.7%	0.2%	0.1%	2.8%	0.0%	0.3%	11.7%
15-21 June 2023	Voxpopuli	1,200	2.9%	17.1%	16.4%	8.5%	7.7%	2.6%	4.6%	6.1%	2.3%	2.8%	5.8%	0.3%	1.0%	0.0%	1.7%	1.2%	0.0%	0.7%
9-20 June 2023	Indostrategic	1,400	2.62%	21.7%	15.2%	10.8%	9.8%	8.4%	7.7%	10.2%	2.8%	2.6%	0.6%	0.2%	0.1%	0.2%	0.6%	0.3%	0.1%	6.5%
5-12 June 2023	Populi Center	1,200	2.83%	20.8%	11.8%	10.1%	7.7%	6.2%	6.8%	6.5%	3.3%	3.1%	0.4%	1.0%	0.0%	0.9%	2.5%	0.5%	0.3%	9.0%
5-11 June 2023	Indopol	1,240	2.85%	25.5%	24.2%	12.1%	4.7%	12.6%	5.8%	4.1%	2.9%	1.2%	0.4%	1.3%	0.8%	0.8%	1.4%	0.3%	0.5%	1.3%
5-10 June 2023	Indometer	1,200	2.98%	17.3%	16.0%	8.8%	7.0%	2.3%	4.4%	6.2%	2.4%	2.7%	5.8%	0.2%	0.6%	0.0%	1.7%	1.0%	0.0%	1.3%
29 May - 10 June 2023	Algoritma	2,009	2.1%	22.7%	13.0%	6.4%	11.4%	6.3%	4.1%	4.8%	2.9%	4.0%	0.6%	0.6%	0.1%	0.2%	1.5%	0.3%	-	9.7%
26 – 30 May 2023	Indikator	1,230	2.90%	20.7%	17.4%	7.7%	6.0%	6.0%	5.2%	6.0%	3.1%	2.0%	0.9%	0.7%	0.3%	0.0%	3.0%	0.4%	0.9%	3.3%
11 - 20 May 2023	SMRC		3.1%	25.1%	16.4%	7.7%	7.5%	5.2%	5.1%	6.7%	3.0%	2.4%	0.6%	0.1%	0.1%	0.9%	1.7%	0.1%	0.3%	8.7%
29 April - 10 May 2023	Litbang Kompas	1200	2.83%	23.3%	18.6%	7.3%	5.5%	6.3%	3.8%	8.0%	3.2%	2.9%	0.3%	0.6%	0.1%	0.3%	3.1%	0.3%	0.2%	4.7%
2 - 7 May 2023	Charta Politika	1220	2.82%	22.1%	14.9%	9.8%	7.8%	6.6%	7.2%	6.1%	3.8%	4.1%	0.5%	0.1%	0.2%	0.1%	3.2%	0.2%	0.3%	7.2%
30 April - 7 May 2023	SMRC	1,020	3,1%	28.2%	15.3%	8.0%	6.8%	4.5%	5.1%	7.0%	2.5%	2.3%	0.5%	0.6%	0.2%	0.4%	2.4%	0.5%	0.0%	12.9%
30 April - 5 May 2023	Indikator	1200	2.90%	20.0%	17.2%	7.8%	6.1%	6.2%	5.7%	7.7%	2.7%	2.6%	0.5%	0.9%	0.3%	0.0%	2.5%	0.5%	0.6%	2.8%
29 April - 10 May 2023	IPO	1,200	2.83%	21.5%	19.7%	9.3%	7.7%	7.5%	4.8%	9.2%	5.0%	2.1%	0.6%	0.4%	0.1%	0.0%	4.5%	0.6%	0.0%	1.8%
27 - 30 April 2023	Charta Politika	1200	2.83%	21.1%	14.1%	10.0%	8.0%	6.8%	6.8%	6.6%	4.0%	3.8%	1.5%	0.2%	0.3%	1.1%	3.6%	0.8%	0.3%	7.0%
18 - 19 April 2023	SMRC	831	3.5%	16.1%	11.7%	8.7%	6.1%	4.9%	4.4%	5.1%	1.6%	2.3%	1.0%	1.1%	1.3%	0.2%	3.3%	0.3%	0.6%	4.4%
11 - 17 April 2023	Indikator	1,220	2.9%	23.9%	13.7%	10.2%	6.6%	6.5%	4.7%	7.6%	2.5%	2.4%	0.2%	1.0%	0.1%	0.1%	2.4%	0.3%	0.2%	10.2%
9 - 15 April 2023	Poltracking	1,220	2.9%	23.3%	16.3%	8.7%	8.5%	8.8%	5.4%	7.4%	2.3%	2.8%	0.6%	0.5%	0.2%	0.3%	2.1%	-	-	7.0%
31 March - 4 April 2023	LSI	1,229	2.9%	17.7%	12.8%	7.8%	4.4%	4.1%	7.6%	5.4%	0.7%	1.4%	1.0%	0.6%	0.9%	0.5%	3.1%	0.3%	0.5%	4.9%
15 - 22 March 2023	New Indonesia	1,200	2.89%	19.1%	13.3%	8.5%	7.3%	3.4%	4.7%	6.4%	2.1%	2.3%	6.0%	0.4%	0.8%	0.0%	1.5%	1.0%	0.0%	5.8%
12 - 18 March 2023	Indikator	800	3.5%	23.5%	14.0%	9.6%	8.2%	6.4%	5.8%	9.1%	2.1%	2.3%	0.6%	0.4%	0.3%	0.2%	2.4%	0.2%	0.0%	9.5%
2 - 11 March 2023	SMRC	1,220	3.1%	23.4%	14.1%	9.1%	10.3%	7.0%	5.7%	5.9%	1.9%	2.4%	1.1%	0.5%	0.1%	-	1.7%	0.5%	0.1%	9.3%
10 - 18 February 2023	POLSTAT	1,220	2.8%	22.2%	16.8%	9.8%	7.4%	7.9%	7.5%	10.2%	2.2%	1.9%	-	-	-	-	5.1%	-	-	5.4%
3 - 13 February 2023	SPIN	1,230		20.6%	19.1%	10.1%	8.9%	4.4%	5.5%	9.5%	1.7%	2.2%	-	-	-	-	3.0%	-	-	1.5%
25 January - 4 February 2023	Litbang Kompas	1,200	2.83%	22.9%	14.3%	9.0%	6.1%	7.3%	4.8%	8.7%	1.6%	2.3%	0.5%	0.5%	-	-	4.1%	-	-	8.6%
25 January - 2 February 2023	Populi	1,200		24.5%	13.6%	11.7%	8.4%	5.8%	5.5%	4.8%	1.3%	2.3%	0.5%	0.4%	0.2%	0.3%	1.8%	0.3%	0.1%	11.2%
23 - 31 January 2023	PWS	1,200	+/-2.83%	21.8%	15.6%	9.6%	7.5%	9.1%	7.8%	10.1%	2.8%	1.9%	-	-	-	-	4.6%	-	-	6.2%
19 - 30 January 2023	Algoritma Research & Consulting	1,214	+/-3.0%	22.1%	12.2%	7.6%	6.8%	7.9%	4.2%	5.3%	1.9%	2.2%	0.2%	0.2%	-	0.8%	1.6%	0.4%	-	9.9%
10 - 18 January 2023	Polmatrix	2,000	2.2%	18.1%	11.7%	8.5%	8.0%	2.9%	4.2%	10.5%	1.8%	2.2%	5.7%	0.7%	1.2%	-	1.0%	1.5%	0.1%	6.4%
18 January 2023	LSJ			22.3%	16.1%	8.9%	6.7%	8.7%	6.9%	9.2%	3.2%	1.9%	-	-	-	-	4.5%	-	-	6.2%
7 - 11 January 2023	LSI	1,221	2.9%	21.9%	12.1%	6.7%	4.7%	5.0%	5.0%	7.1%	0.6%	2.2%	0.3%	0.5%	0.5%	0.3%	4.8%	0.1%	1.3%	2.8%
5 - 10 January 2023	New Indonesia	1,200	2.89%	18.6%	12.8%	8.1%	7.5%	3.5%	4.8%	6.0%	2.5%	2.0%	5.8%	0.3%	0.6%	-	1.3%	1.1%	0.1%	5.8%
27 December 2022 - 9 January 2023	Citra Network	2,200	2.08%	18.6%	16.4%	19.8%	6.4%	4.2%	7.2%	8.8%	2.7%	4.4%	-	-	-	-	-	-	-	3.4%
4 January 2023	Indo Riset/Indikator Politik			26.0%	12.6%	12.0%	8.7%	6.5%	6.4%	9.6%	2.1%	3.6%	0.6%	0.8%	0.3%	-	3.1%	0.2%	0.3%	13.4%
4 January 2023	Indo Riset/Indikator Politik			25.7%	9.5%	10.5%	7.4%	5.1%	4.4%	9.0%	2.3%	2.1%	-	-	-	-	2.8%	-	-	15.2%
17 April 2019	Election results			19.33%	12.57%	12.31%	9.69%	9.05%	8.21%	7.77%	6.84%	4.52%	1.89%	1.54%	-	-	2.67%	-	0.5%	6.76%

=== 2022 ===
Date	Polling firm	Sample size	Margin of Error	PDIP	Gerindra	Golkar	PKB	NasDem	PKS	Demokrat	PAN	PPP	PSI	Hanura	Ummat	PRIMA	Others	Lead
17 - 23 December 2022	VoxPopuli	1,200	2.9%	18.4%	13.5%	7.3%	8.0%	3.3%	4.8%	5.7%	2.2%	2.0%	5.5%	0.5%	0.8%	-	3.0%	4.9%
11 - 20 December 2022	IndEX	1,200	2.9%	18.5%	12.0%	7.1%	6.8%	1.7%	5.6%	7.4%	-	-	6.2%	-	-	-	-	6.5%
8 - 16 December 2022	Charta Politika	1,220	2.83%	23.5%	13.7%	9.0%	8.7%	4.3%	7.2%	7.7%	3.4%	3.4%	0.5%	0.2%	-	-	4.9%	9.8%
3 - 11 December 2022	SMRC	1,029	3.1%	24.1%	8.9%	9.4%	6.1%	3.2%	6.2%	8.9%	1.7%	2.9%	0.5%	0.7%	0.0%	-	5.8%	14.7%
1 - 10 December 2022	SPIN	1,230	2.8%	21.6%	20.1%	9.7%	8.4%	4.5%	5.4%	9.9%	1.2%	2.2%	0.7%	0.2%	-	-	3.1%	1.5%
1 - 8 December 2022	CPCS	1,200	2.9%	18.8%	11.6%	7.3%	6.3%	1.9%	5.0%	7.5%	2.8%	2.0%	5.8%	0.6%	0.8%	-	4.6%	7.2%
18 - 28 November 2022	LSI	1,500	3.05%	18.2%	11.8%	7.2%	4.6%	8.2%	7.4%	14.1%	2.4%	2.1%	1.2%	0.9%	-	-	1.6%	4.1%
9 - 17 November 2022	Median	1,200	2.83%	22.5%	14.4%	11.2%	10.2%	7.5%	5.1%	8.5%	1.3%	3.9%	1.0%	0.4%	-	-	2.5%	8.1%
5 - 13 November 2022	SMRC	1,220	3.1%	25.6%	9.0%	9.7%	5.6%	4.8%	4.1%	8.6%	3.2%	-	-	-	-	-	3.0%	15.9%
6 - 12 November 2022	SSI	1,200	1.83%	18.3%	19.0%	8.9%	1.9%	5.1%	5.8%	6.3%	1.7%	2.3%	0.1%	0.1%	-	-	1.5%	0.7%
4 - 12 November 2022	Charta Politika	1,220	2.83%	21.7%	14.5%	9.8%	8.5%	6.0%	6.9%	7.3%	4.0%	3.6%	0.5%	0.4%	-	-	3.8%	7.2%
22 October - 7 November 2022	Voxpol	1,220	2.81%	20.3%	18.2%	11.6%	11.2%	7.4%	9.6%	5.7%	2.4%	3.0%	-	-	-	-	13.8%	2.1%
27 October - 5 November 2022	IndoStrategi	1,230	2.83%	20.4%	17.9%	10.1%	9.9%	4.0%	5.8%	10.3%	1.5%	1.3%	1.1%	0.8%	0.3%	-	5.1%	2.5%
31 October 2022	DPI	1,200	3.0%	24.3%	14.2%	10.1%	6.7%	6.1%	7.0%	9.8%	2.5%	1.8%	0.1%	0.4%	-	-	5.2%	10.1%
19 - 24 October 2022	IPO	1,200	2.9%	26.2%	12.4%	9.3%	7.9%	5.2%	6.3%	8.7%	2.1%	1.7%	-	-	-	-	4.7%	13.8%
17 - 22 October 2022	Polmatrix	2,000	2.2%	18.5%	10.8%	8.0%	7.7%	3.1%	4.7%	11.3%	2.5%	2.0%	5.5%	0.5%	1.0%	-	4.2%	7.2%
9 - 17 October 2022	Populi Center	1,200	2.83%	15.7%	12.6%	10.3%	7.8%	7.3%	6.4%	6.3%	2.0%	3.0%	0.3%	0.2%	-	-	2.1%	3.1%
7 - 17 October 2022	IPS	1,200	2.83%	22.7%	15.8%	10.4%	6.8%	7.2%	7.1%	10.5%	2.1%	1.8%	1.1%	-	1.0%	-	5.3%	6.9%
7 - 16 October 2022	SPIN	1,230	2.8%	21.5%	19.6%	10.1%	8.2%	4.3%	5.4%	9.7%	1.3%	2.3%	-	-	-	-	3.1%	1.9%
3 - 9 October 2022	SMRC	1,220	3.1%	24.0%	13.4%	8.5%	7.1%	5.4%	6.9%	5.5%	1.2%	3.3%	-	-	-	-	5.4%	10.6%
1 - 9 October 2022	Polstat			12.9%	12.5%	10.5%	2.9%	1.9%	10.2%	14.0%	4.1%	2.4%	2.9%	-	0.5%	-	5.4%	0.4%
24 September - 7 October 2022	Litbang Kompas	1,200	2.8%	21.1%	16.2%	7.9%	5.6%	4.3%	6.3%	14.0%	3.1%	1.7%	-	-	-	-	4.5%	4.9%
10 - 20 September 2022	LSJ	1,220	2.81%	22.8%	16.9%	10.3%	6.9%	3.8%	7.3%	10.1%	2.8%	2.1%	-	-	-	-	7.9%	5.9%
6 - 13 September 2022	Charta Politika	1,220	2.82%	21.4%	14.8%	9.3%	8.7%	4.8%	7.6%	6.6%	2.7%	2.1%	0.9%	0.4%	-	-	3.7%	6.6%
5 September 2022	Muhamad Mardiono is appointed as Acting-Chairman of PPP																	
12 - 24 August 2022	Warna Institute	2,200	2.09%	14.6%	14.8%	15.8%	5.2%	4.4%	5.1%	5.4%	4.1%	4.1%	1.8%	0.8%	-	-	3.2%	1.0%
9 - 18 August 2022	ISC	1,520	2.5%	21.1%	19.8%	8.8%	6.7%	5.5%	5.8%	9.1%	2.1%	2.2%	-	-	-	-	3.6%	1.3%
8 - 13 August 2022	CSIS	1,220	3.07%	21.6%	18.0%	11.3%	6.9%	5.1%	5.8%	11.3%	1.8%	1.8%	0.8%	0.5%	-	-	6.3%	3.6%
5 - 13 August 2022	SMRC	1,220	3.1%	24.8%	12.6%	9.1%	9.5%	3.5%	4.1%	6.6%	1.9%	2.7%	-	-	-	-	4.0%	12.2%
1 - 8 August 2022	IPS	1,220	2.8%	22.3%	17.8%	10.9%	6.7%	3.6%	6.8%	10.8%	2.8%	1.9%	1.1%	0.5%	0.4%	-	5.3%	4.5%
1 - 7 August 2022	Poltracking	1,220	2.9%	20.4%	10.5%	9.5%	8.0%	6.7%	5.2%	8.6%	4.1%	3.1%	1.1%	0.3%	-	-	3.5%	9.9%
22 - 27 July 2022	CPCS	1,200	2.9%	19.5%	13.2%	8.8%	7.1%	2.1%	6.0%	5.3%	2.3%	2.7%	5.6%	0.4%	1.0%	-	4.6%	6.3%
3 - 12 July 2022	SSI	1,200	2.83%	18.58%	12.50%	9.83%	5.08%	3.08%	5.92%	5.00%	1.33%	2.92%	0.08%	0.08%	-	-	1.07%	6.08%
1 - 7 July 2022	IndEx	1,200	2.9%	18.1%	12.6%	7.8%	6.5%	1.5%	7.0%	4.7%	2.3%	1.8%	6.0%	0.5%	0.8%	-	4.1%	5.5%
21 June - 5 July 2022	ARSC	1,225	2.8%	14.9%	10.0%	8.8%	3.2%	4.2%	5.0%	4.9%	1.7%	0.7%	0.5%	-	-	-	3.4%	4.9%
12 June - 3 July 2022	PRC	1,200	2.74%	18.2%	12.7%	12.0%	8.0%	5.5%	7.8%	9.7%	1.0%	2.9%	0.5%	0.1%	-	-	1.8%	5.5%
24 June - 1 July 2022	Indopol	1,230	2.8%	18.94%	9.43%	6.34%	3.98%	3.41%	4.55%	5.04%	-	-	-	-	-	-	-	9.51%
10 - 24 June 2022	LSN	1,500	2.53%	22.2%	16.4%	10.1%	6.7%	3.6%	5.1%	11.1%	2.6%	1.9%	0.9%	0.5%	0.4%	-	4.0%	5.8%
16 - 21 June 2022	Polmatrix	2,000	2.2%	17.8%	12.4%	7.3%	8.8%	3.8%	5.1%	8.5%	1.6%	2.6%	5.4%	0.6%	1.4%	-	3.7%	5.4%
26 May - 4 June 2022	Litbang Kompas	1,200	2.8%	22.8%	12.5%	10.3%	5.4%	4.1%	5.4%	11.6%	3.6%	2.0%	0.7%	1.0%	-	-	3.7%	2.5%
25 May - 2 June 2022	Charta Politika	1,200	2.83%	16.3%	13.8%	11.3%	8.3%	5.3%	7.0%	7.2%	2.0%	2.7%	0.6%	0.4%	0.1%	-	1.8%	2.5%
16 - 30 May 2022	Citra Network; Nasional	2,200	2.08%	16.3%	17.7%	18.2%	5.1%	4.2%	4.1%	4.1%	4.8%	4.4%	1.7%	0.9%	0.1%	2.2%	5.9%	0.5%
23 - 28 May 2022	IPO	1,200	2.9%	24.8%	11.6%	9.7%	9.2%	5.9%	5.4%	10.8%	4.9%	2.4%	-	-	-	-	3.6%	13.2%
16 - 22 May 2022	Poltracking	1,220	2.9%	21.3%	10.6%	9.9%	8.0%	7.3%	5.8%	7.2%	4.4%	3.2%	-	-	-	-	1.0%	10.7%
11 - 21 May 2022	SPIN	1,230	2.8%	19.7%	17.9%	5.2%	4.3%	5.4%	4.9%	7.4%	1.3%	3.3%	0.3%	0.3%	0.1%	-	2.1%	1.8%
6 - 20 May 2022	PSI	2,160	2.11%	16.2%	16.1%	16.9%	4.7%	6.4%	5.6%	5.2%	2.2%	2.2%	0.9%	0.2%	0.1%	2.2%	5.5%	0.7%
10 - 17 May 2022	SMRC	1,220	3.07%	23.7%	9.2%	8.3%	6.2%	2.0%	2.5%	5.7%	1.7%	1.4%	0.6%	0.4%	-	0.2%	2.4%	14.5%
17 - 30 April 2022	LKPI	2,150	2.12%	16.4%	16.3%	17.8%	4.3%	4.2%	5.2%	7.4%	2.2%	2.1%	0.5%	0.2%	0.1%	2.0%	6.5%	1.4%
20 - 27 April 2022	Indometer	1,200	2.98%	18.4%	12.2%	5.6%	8.1%	4.2%	4.7%	5.8%	1.8%	2.5%	5.2%	0.6%	1.4%	-	3.7%	6.2%
11 - 20 April 2022	CPCS	1,200	2.9%	18.1%	12.3%	8.3%	6.8%	4.0%	4.4%	5.1%	1.7%	2.3%	5.5%	0.5%	1.3%	-	3.2%	5.8%
14 - 19 April 2022	Indikator Politik; Indonesia	1,220	2.9%	23.7%	11.4%	10.2%	9.8%	3.9%	5.5%	9.1%	1.1%	3.3%	-	-	-	-	3.2%	12,3%
10 - 17 April 2022	Charta Politika	1,220	2.83%	24.7%	11.9%	9.2%	9.8%	5.1%	7.7%	7.7%	1.5%	2.0%	0.2%	0.3%	0.2%	-	2.0%	12,8%
28 March - 7 April 2022	SPIN	1,230	2.8%	22.1%	20.6%	6.2%	4.3%	7.6%	6.0%	8.7%	1.1%	3.3%	0.8%	0.2%	0.1%	-	2.7%	1.5%
19 March - 4 April 2022	WRC	2,426	1.99%	16.3%	15.7%	16.7%	6.2%	4.2%	6.1%	7.1%	1.8%	1.7%	0.4%	1.3%	0.3%	2.0%	7.5%	0.4%
11 - 31 March 2022	LPMM	2,140	2.12%	18.2%	17.9%	20.7%	4.2%	4.2%	5.4%	4.6%	1.8%	1.6%	0.7%	0.4%	0.3%	1.8%	5.4%	2.5%
21 - 30 March 2022	IndEx	1,200	2.9%	17.5%	13.0%	8.3%	6.4%	4.1%	4.8%	5.4%	1.5%	2.1%	6.1%	0.7%	1.2%	-	3.4%	4.5%
21 - 29 March 2022	Populi Center	1,200	2.83%	19.3%	11.6%	11.3%	6.8%	3.1%	5.1%	6.7%	2.5%	3.5%	0.3%	0.5%	0.2%	-	2.2%	7.7%
17 - 27 March 2022	IPN	1,200	2.83%	21.2%	19.8%	9.2%	4.2%	8.0%	7.9%	10.3%	1.6%	4.0%	-	-	-	-	4.0%	1.4%
11 - 20 March 2022	Polmatrix	2,000	2.2%	16.1%	12.3%	9.6%	9.2%	5.1%	5.0%	8.4%	1.7%	2.3%	6.0%	0.5%	1.3%	-	3.5%	3.8%
8 - 18 March 2022	IPS	1,220	2.8%	20.9%	16.5%	11.4%	7.1%	5.5%	7.1%	8.3%	2.6%	2.1%	-	-	-	-	2.2%	4.4%
11 - 17 March 2022	IPO	1,220		26.1%	12.7%	8.5%	4.6%	5.8%	6.1%	10.3%	2.2%	2.6%	-	-	-	-	3.8%	13.4%
1 - 15 March 2022	DSI	2,500	1.92%	14.8%	14.6%	16.1%	5.2%	5.1%	6.3%	7.2%	2.2%	1.7%	1.1%	1.1%	0.2%	1.9%	6.4%	1.3%
24 February - 9 March 2022	Indonesia Political; Review	2,140	2.12%	18.3%	18.1%	19.1%	5.2%	7.2%	6.6%	4.2%	1.9%	1.4%	1.1%	0.8%	0.4%	1.8%	5.9%	0.8%
1 - 7 March 2022	Median	1,200	2.83%	19.6%	13.5%	8.8%	8.6%	4.5%	6.3%	10.6%	2.0%	2.5%	1.5%	0.7%	0.2%	-	2.6%	6.1%
24 February - 4 March 2022	Y-Publica	1,200	2.89%	15.3%	12.5%	8.6%	6.5%	4.5%	5.2%	8.9%	1.3%	2.4%	5.4%	0.5%	1.4%	-	3.2%	2.8%
20 January - 3 February 2022	INES	2,058	2.16%	15.2%	14.8%	18.2%	7.4%	4.7%	5.1%	5.2%	2.8%	2.7%	0.5%	0.9%	0.1%	1.8%	3.9%	3.0%
21 - 31 January 2022	CPCS	1,200	2.9%	15.8%	13.0%	8.1%	6.5%	4.3%	4.6%	5.0%	1.5%	2.6%	5.1%	0.6%	1.6%	-	3.3%	2.8%
12 - 28 January 2022	LKPI	1,982	2.21%	15.2%	14.8%	16.9%	5.4%	4.3%	5.3%	5.7%	3.2%	2.2%	1.0%	1.0%	0.1%	1.9%	5.5%	1.7%
3 - 12 January 2022	Trust Indonesia; Research and Consulting	1,200	2.83%	21.8%	17.3%	10.6%	8.1%	3.9%	9.9%	7.0%	1.9%	2.9%	0.5%	0.1%	0.1%	-	2.0%	4.5%
22 December 2021 - 6 January 2022	DSI	1,988	2.2%	13.9%	13.3%	13.6%	6.2%	5.7%	6.7%	5.2%	4.2%	2.1%	1.1%	1.3%	0.9%	1.8%	6.8%	0.3%
26 December 2021 - 5 January 2022	IndEX	1,200	2.9%	16.7%	13.5%	7.0%	6.1%	4.0%	5.5%	4.9%	1.1%	2.5%	5.4%	0.6%	1.3%	-	3.3%	3.2%
17 April 2019	Election results			19.33%	12.57%	12.31%	9.69%	9.05%	8.21%	7.77%	6.84%	4.52%	1.89%	1.54%	-	-	6.27%	6.76%

=== 2021 ===
Date	Polling firm	Sample size	Margin of Error	PDIP	Gerindra	Golkar	PKB	NasDem	PKS	Demokrat	PAN	PPP	PSI	Hanura	Ummat	Others	Lead
14 - 29 December 2021	PSI	1,820	2.3%	12.7%	11.9%	12.4%	7.1%	6.8%	6.1%	8.9%	3.3%	2.6%	1.3%	1.1%	0.2%	6.9%	0.3%
11 - 20 December 2021	Indometer	1,200	2.98%	16.5%	13.1%	7.3%	7.8%	4.0%	6.4%	4.8%	1.5%	2.6%	5.1%	0.7%	1.7%	3.5%	3.4%
8 - 16 December 2021	SMRC	2,420	2.2%	25.2%	10.8%	11.2%	8.4%	3.4%	5.1%	6.2%	1.8%	2.7%	-	-	-	-	14.0%
1 - 9 December 2021	Populi Center		2.83%	20.5%	13.1%	8.3%	8.2%	3.9%	7.0%	9.6%	1.7%	2.8%	0.7%	0.3%	-	2.1%	7.4%
1 - 7 December 2021	CISA	1,200	2.85%	24.92%	10.5%	13.09%	10.25%	5.75%	6.5%	18.83%	3.66%	2.92%	-	-	-	3.58%	6.09%
21 - 30 November 2021	Polmatrix	2,000		15.8%	11.0%	4.7%	9.4%	5.0%	5.7%	9.0%	1.2%	2.5%	5.2%	0.4%	1.5%	3.5%	4.8%
19 - 27 November 2021	Indopol	1,230	2.8%	15.04%	13.01%	6.34%	3.98%	2.11%	1.95%	5.77%	1.95%	1.30%	0.41%	0.00%	-	1.87%	2.03%
16 November 2021	Giring Ganesha is elected as Chairman of PSI																
11 - 20 November 2021	New Indonesia; Research & Consulting	1,200	2.89%	16.4%	9.6%	4.9%	7.7%	9.3%	4.5%	7.3%	1.1%	2.2%	5.4%	0.6%	1.5%	3.7%	6.8%
1 - 7 November 2021	Y-Publica	1,200	2.89%	17.8%	13.0%	8.3%	6.0%	4.0%	5.0%	10.4%	1.2%	2.2%	5.4%	0.8%	1.5%	4.2%	4.8%
5 - 15 October 2021	CPCS	1,200	2.9%	17.4%	13.3%	8.5%	5.7%	3.9%	4.8%	10.6%	1.3%	2.5%	5.0%	0.7%	1.7%	4.0%	4.1%
26 September - 9 October 2021	Litbang Kompas	1,200	2.8%	19.1%	8.8%	7.3%	3.9%	2.0%	6.7%	5.4%	1.7%	1.3%	0.8%	0.3%	-	1.9%	10.3%
24 September - 8 October 2021	LSI	2,178		13.10%	12.6%	12.8%	5.8%	6.3%	5.4%	6.3%	-	-	-	-	-	-	0.3%
21 - 30 September 2021	IndEX	1,200	2.9%	17.8%	13.9%	8.7%	5.8%	3.8%	5.0%	10.6%	1.3%	2.3%	5.2%	0.8%	1.5%	3.7%	3.9%
15 - 21 September 2021	SMRC	1,220	3.05%	22.1%	9.9%	11.3%	10.0%	4.2%	6.0%	8.6%	1.4%	2.3%	-	-	-	-	10.8%
24 August - 3 September 2021	Arus Survei; Indonesia	1,200		18.4%	11.1%	10.5%	7.9%	8.5%	5.9%	8.2%	6.1	2.1%	1.1%	0.8%	0.1%	5.6%	7.3%
27 - 31 August 2021	CISA	1,200	2.85%	24.58%	7.25%	14.25%	10.67%	5.33%	9.33%	18.75%	3.75%	2.92%	-	-	-	3.17%	5.83%
10 - 20 August 2021	Vox Populi; Research Center	1,200	2.9%	15.8%	13.5%	8.8%	6.1%	3.7%	4.9%	11.2%	1.3%	2.0%	5.0%	0.7%	1.5%	3.6%	2.3%
2 - 10 August 2021	Indonesia Political; Opinion	1,200	2.5%	19.5%	12.6%	13.8%	7.5%	7.8%	4.9%	8.7%	5.8%	1.9%	1.8%	0.9%	-	5.4%	5.7%
22 - 30 July 2021	New Indonesia; Research & Consulting	1,200	2.89%	19.8%	10.4%	7.3%	5.7%	3.5%	4.8%	10.1%	1.2%	2.0%	5.3%	0.5%	1.7%	2.5%	9.4%
22 June - 1 July 2021	Voxpol Center	1,200	2.83%	23.0%	27.9%	6.8%	4.9%	2.3%	9.4%	7.8%	0.9%	1.3%	0.3%	0.8%	0.2%	2.1%	4.9%
21-30 May 2021	IndEX	1,200	2.90%	22.3%	12.7%	7.5%	5.2%	3.5%	6.0%	8.3%	1.0%	2.2%	5.1%	0.5%	1.6%	0.6%	9.6%
21 - 28 May 2021	SMRC	1,220	3.05%	19.3%	10.9%	10.7%	9.7%	3.7%	4.6%	6.6%	2.6%	1.8%	-	-	-	-	8.4%
22 May 2021	ARSC	1,200	2.90%	19.6%	15.0%	10.4%	5.5%	4.4%	9.1%	15.0%	4.4%	1.5%	2.4%	0.2%	-	0.8%	4.6%
13-17 April 2021	Indikator Politik; Indonesia	1,200	2.90%	25.3%	13.1%	9.2%	7.2%	2.3%	7.2%	8.0%	1.5%	2.4%	0.4%	0.3%	-	2.1%	12.2%
20-25 March 2021	Polmatrix	2,000	2.20%	20.3%	10.5%	8.4%	5.4%	3.7%	5.1%	8.1%	1.0%	1.6%	5.0%	0.3%	1.3%	0.9%	9.8%
20-24 March 2021	Charta Politika	1,200	2.89%	20.7%	14.2%	7.8%	9.7%	5.4%	8.2%	4.2%	1.0%	2.2%	1.8%	0.6%	0.1%	2.0%	6.5%
25 February-5 March 2021	IndEX	1,200	2.90%	24.7%	12.3%	7.8%	5.4%	3.6%	6.2%	7.1%	1.1%	2.0%	5.0%	0.6%	1.3%	1.1%	12.4%
22 February 2021	Litbang Kompas	2,000	2.83%	19.7%	9.6%	3.4%	5.5%	1.7%	5.4%	4.6%	0.8%	0.5%	0.2%	0.2%	-	1.1%	10.1%
20-31 January 2021	New Indonesia; Research & Consulting	1,200	2.89%	23.1%	12.6%	9.1%	6.4%	3.5%	7.7%	8.2%	1.0%	2.0%	4.8%	0.2%	1.1%	0.3%	10.5%
17 April 2019	Election results			19.33%	12.57%	12.31%	9.69%	9.05%	8.21%	7.77%	6.84%	4.52%	1.89%	1.54%	-	6.27%	6.76%

=== 2020 ===
Date	Polling firm	Sample size	Margin of Error	PDIP	Gerindra	Golkar	PKB	NasDem	PKS	Demokrat	PAN	PPP	PSI	Hanura	Ummat	Others	Lead
26-31 December 2020	Vox Populi; Research Center	1,200	2.90%	19.6%	9.3%	8.4%	5.5%	3.6%	8.1%	5.1%	-	2.1%	4.9%	-	-	-	10.3%
23-26 December 2020	SMRC	1,202	2.90%	31.3%	13.4%	5.6%	3.0%	3.1%	5.2%	4.5%	1.1%	1.2%	-	-	-	-	17.9%
8-12 November 2020	IndEX	1,200	2.90%	31.5%	13.4%	8.0%	5.1%	3.7%	5.5%	3.2%	1.7%	2.0%	4.8%	0.5%	0.1%	1.4%	18.1%
5 October 2020	Ahmad Syaikhu is elected as President of PKS																
16 September 2020	Polmatrix	1,200	2.90%	28.7%	13.9%	8.4%	5.3%	3.9%	5.8%	3.7%	2.0%	1.7%	4.5%	0.5%	-	1.5%	14.8%
15 March 2020	Agus Harimurti Yudhoyono is elected as Chairman of Demokrat																
17 April 2019	Election results			19.33%	12.57%	12.31%	9.69%	9.05%	8.21%	7.77%	6.84%	4.52%	1.89%	1.54%	-	6.27%	6.76%

== See also ==
- Opinion polling for the 2024 Indonesian presidential election
