= Opinion polling for the 2024 Indonesian presidential election =

Opinion polls for the 2024 Indonesian presidential election

This page lists public opinion polls conducted for the 2024 Indonesian presidential election. Incumbent president Joko Widodo is ineligible to run for a third term.

== First round ==
=== After candidate nominations ===
==== National ====
Quick count Real count

Pollster	Fieldwork date	Sample size	Margin of error			
Pollster	Fieldwork date	Sample size	Margin of error	Prabowo Gerindra	Anies Independent	Ganjar PDI-P
14 February 2024	Election results			58.59%	24.95%	16.47%
Litbang Kompas	14 February 2024			58.45%	25.25%	16.30%
Charta Politika	14 February 2024			57.99%	25.36%	16.64%
SMRC	14 February 2024	1,994		58.36%	24.86%	16.78%
Lembaga Survei Indonesia	14 February 2024		1%	57.46%	25.30%	17.23%
Indikator	14 February 2024	3,000	0.52%	58.17%	25.38%	16.46%
LSI Denny JA	14 February 2024			58.47%	24.98%	16.55%
Poltracking	14 February 2024	3,000	1%	58.51%	25.13%	16.36%
Populi Center	14 February 2024		0.16%	59.08%	25.06%	15.86%
CSIS - Cyrus Network	14 February 2024	2,000	1%	58.22%	24.94%	16.84%
Politika Research & Consulting	14 February 2024			59.22%	24.07%	16.71%
SPIN	5 - 8 February 2024	1,200	2.8%	54.8%	24.3%	16.1%
LSI Denny JA	26 January - 6 February 2024	1,200	2.9%	53.5%	21.7%	19.2%
Lembaga Survei Indonesia	29 January - 5 February 2024	1,220	2.9%	51.9%	23.3%	20.3%
4 February 2024	Fifth presidential debate					
Indikator	28 January - 4 February 2024	1,200	2.9%	51.8%	24.1%	19.6%
Populi Center	27 January - 3 February 2024	1,500	2.53%	52.5%	22.1%	16.9%
Poltracking	25 January - 2 February 2024	1,220	2.9%	50.9%	25.1%	18.4%
Lembaga Point Indonesia	26 - 28 January 2024	1,500	2.53%	52.9%	22.7%	19.1%
Political Weather Station	21 - 25 January 2024	1,220	2.81%	52.3%	21.3%	19.7%
LSI Denny JA	16 - 26 January 2024	1,200	2.9%	50.7%	22%	19.7%
21 January 2024	Fourth presidential debate					
Polling Institute	15 - 16 January 2024	1,219	2.9%	48.7%	23%	20.9%
Indonesia Survey Center	11 - 19 January 2024	1,670	2.4%	52%	21.7%	18.1%
Indikator	10 - 16 January 2024	1,200	2.9%	48.6%	24.2%	21.6%
SPIN	8 - 14 January 2024	2,178	2.1%	50.9%	18.7%	23.5%
Lembaga Survei Indonesia	10 - 11 January 2024	1,206	2.9%	47.0%	23.2%	21.7%
Indonesia Polling Stations	7 - 13 January 2024	1,220	2.8%	51.8%	21.3%	19.2%
Charta Politika	4 - 11 January 2024	1,220	2.82%	42.2%	26.7%	28.0%
LSI Denny JA	3 - 11 January 2024	1,200	2.9%	46.6%	22.8%	24.8%
7 January 2024	Third presidential debate					
Indonesia Political Opinion	1 - 7 January 2024	1,200	2.5%	42.3%	34.5%	21.5%
Poltracking	1 - 7 January 2024	1,220	2.9%	46.7%	26.9%	20.6%
Indikator	30 December 2023 - 6 January 2024	1,200	2%	45,8%	25,5%	23%
Ipsos Public Affairs	27 December 2023 - 5 January 2024	2,000	2.19%	48.1%	21.8%	18.4%
Lembaga Survei Nasional	28 December 2023 - 2 January 2024	1,420	2.6%	49.5%	24.3%	20.5%
Median	23 December 2023 - 1 January 2024	1,500	2.53%	43.1%	26.8%	20.1%
Polling Institute	26 - 28 December 2023	1,246	2.9%	46.2%	24.6%	21.3%
PRC	20 - 27 December 2023	1,200	2.7%	42.4%	28.0%	21.8%
ICRC	20 - 26 December 2023	1,230	2.79%	39.4%	25.6%	29.1%
Indikator	23 - 24 December 2023	1,217	2.9%	46.7%	21.0%	24.5%
LSI Denny JA	17 - 23 December 2023	1,200	2.9%	43.3%	25.3%	22.9%
22 December 2023	Second presidential debate					
Polling Institute	15 - 19 December 2023	2,130	2.9%	46.1%	22.1%	20.5%
CSIS	13 - 18 December 2023	1,300	2.7%	43.7%	26.1%	19.4%
Puspoll	11 - 18 December 2023	1,220	2.83%	41%	26.1%	27.6%
12 December 2023	First presidential debate					
Indikator Publik	3 - 11 December 2023	1,670	2.4%	50.2%	22.7%	23.1%
Poltracking	29 November - 5 December 2023	1,220	2.9%	45.2%	23.1%	27.3%
Populi Center	28 November - 5 December 2023	1,200	2.83%	46.7%	21.7%	21.7%
Litbang Kompas	29 November - 4 December 2023	1,364	2.65%	39.3%	16.7%	15.3%
Indikator	23 November - 1 December 2023	1,200	2.9%	38.2%	19.1%	20.4%
LSI Denny JA	6 - 13 November 2023	1,200	2.90%	40.3%	20.3%	28.6%
Populi Center	29 October - 5 November 2023	1,200	2.83%	43.1%	22.3%	23.0%
Poltracking	28 October - 3 November 2023	1,220	2.9%	40.2%	24.4%	30.1%
Indikator	27 October - 1 November 2023	1,220	2.9%	39.7%	24.4%	30.0%
Charta Politika	26 - 31 October 2023	2,400	2.0%	34.7%	24.3%	36.8%
Indo Barometer	25 - 31 October 2023	1,230	2.79%	43.5%	23.2%	33.3%

==== By province ====
===== Banten =====
Pollster	Fieldwork date	Sample size	Margin of error			
Pollster	Fieldwork date	Sample size	Margin of error	Prabowo Gerindra	Anies Independent	Ganjar PDI-P
Indikator	27 October - 1 November 2023	Part of national survey	Part of national survey	55.1%	34.8%	10.1%

===== Jakarta =====
Pollster	Fieldwork date	Sample size	Margin of error			
Pollster	Fieldwork date	Sample size	Margin of error	Prabowo Gerindra	Anies Independent	Ganjar PDI-P
Indikator	27 October - 1 November 2023	Part of national survey	Part of national survey	29.8%	39.2%	17.2%

===== West Java =====
Pollster	Fieldwork date	Sample size	Margin of error			
Pollster	Fieldwork date	Sample size	Margin of error	Prabowo Gerindra	Anies Independent	Ganjar PDI-P
Indikator	27 October - 1 November 2023	Part of national survey	Part of national survey	37.7%	30.1%	26.7%

===== East Java =====
Pollster	Fieldwork date	Sample size	Margin of error			
Pollster	Fieldwork date	Sample size	Margin of error	Prabowo Gerindra	Anies Independent	Ganjar PDI-P
Indikator	27 October - 1 November 2023	Part of national survey	Part of national survey	49.0%	16.2%	30.0%

=== 2023 ===
Pollster	Fieldwork date	Sample size	Margin of error			
Pollster	Fieldwork date	Sample size	Margin of error	Prabowo Gerindra	Anies Independent	Ganjar PDI-P
Indikator	27 October - 1 November	1,220	2.9%	40.6%	23.7%	27.8%
Charta Politika	26 - 31 October	2,400	2.0%	35.3%	24.3%	36.9%
19 - 25 October	Candidate registration period					
Indikator	16 - 20 October	2,567	1.97%	37%	22.3%	34.8%
Ipsos Public Affairs	17 - 19 October	1,207	2.83%	31.3% (Note: With Gibran Rakabuming Raka as running mate)	28.9% (Note: With Muhaimin Iskandar as running mate)	32% (Note: With Mahfud MD as running mate)
Lembaga Survei Indonesia	16 - 18 October	1,229	2.9%	35.8%	19.7%	30.9%
Indikator	2 - 10 October	1,200	2.9%	37.0%	21.9%	34.5%
Ipsos Public Affairs	1 - 10 October	2,039	2.19%	30.1%	20%	29.8%
Lembaga Survei Indonesia	2 - 8 October	1,620	2.5%	37.0%	22.7%	35.2%
Alvara Research Center	1 - 6 October	1,517	2.52%	30.1% (Note: With Gibran Rakabuming Raka as running mate)	19.4% (Note: With Muhaimin Iskandar as running mate)	36.5% (Note: With Mahfud MD as running mate)
Polling Institute	1 - 3 October	1,206	2,9%	36.5%	18,7%	31,2%
Indonesia Survey Center	17 - 27 September	1,200	2.83%	42.3%	20.4%	33.1%
Lingkaran Survei Indonesia	4 - 12 September	1,200	2.9%	39.8%	14.5%	37.9%
Poligov	5 - 11 September	1,200	2.9%	33.6%	15.8%	33.1%
SMRC	5 - 8 September	1,212	2.9%	31.7% (Note: With Erick Thohir as running mate)	16.5% (Note: With Muhaimin Iskandar as running mate)	35.4% (Note: With Ridwan Kamil as running mate)
Poltracking	3 - 9 September	1,220	2.9%	38.9%	19.9%	37%
Ipsos Public Affairs	22 - 27 August	1,200	2.83%	37.2%	22.7%	40.1%
Lembaga Survei Nasional	14 - 24 August	1,420	2.6%	40.7%	22.1%	31.4%
Lembaga Survei Jakarta	14 - 24 August	1,200	2.83%	40.8%	20.9%	33.1%
Political Weather Station	13 - 20 August	1,200	2.83%	40.8%	19.5%	35.6%
Lembaga Survei Indonesia	3 - 9 August	1,220	2.90%	35.3%	22.2%	37.0%
SMRC	31 July - 11 August	4,260	1.65%	33.6%	20.4%	35.9%
Litbang Kompas	27 July - 7 August	1,364	2.65%	31.3%	19.2%	34.1%
SPIN	15 – 25 July	1,230	2.80%	41.7%	21.0%	30.3%
Indikator	15 - 21 July	1,811	2.35%	33.2%	23.9%	35.2%
Lembaga Survei Nasional	10 – 19 July	1,420	2.60%	40.5%	22.4%	30.8%
Lembaga Survei Indonesia	1 – 8 July	1,242	2.80%	35.8%	21.4%	32.2%
Indikator	20 – 24 June	1,220	2.90%	36.8%	21.5%	35.7%
Political Weather Station	10 – 18 June	1,200	2.83%	40.5%	20.8%	33.4%
Utting Research	12 – 17 June	1,200	2.80%	33%	27%	34%
Populi Center	5 – 12 June	1,200	2.83%	33.4%	23.2%	35.8%
Indopol	5 – 11 June	1,240	2.85%	31.2%	26.5%	30.5%
Algoritma	29 May - 10 June	2,009	2.1%	30.8%	22.1%	34.0%
Lembaga Survei Nasional	24 May – 3 June	1,420	2.60%	38.5%	21.9%	32.8%
SMRC	30 – 31 May	909	3.30%	33.5%	19.2%	37.9%
Indikator	26 – 30 May	1,230	2.90%	38.0%	18.9%	34.2%
SMRC	23 – 24 May	915	3.30%	32.8%	20.1%	35.9%
LSI Denny JA	3 – 14 May	1,200	2.90%	33.9%	20.8%	31.9%
Populi Center	4 – 12 May	1,200	2.83%	35.8%	21.5%	34.4%
Litbang Kompas	29 Apr – 10 May	1,200	2.83%	36.8%	23.2%	40.0%
Charta Politika	2 – 7 May	1,220	2.82%	31.1%	23.6%	38.2%
SMRC	30 Apr – 7 May	1,220	3.10%	32.1%	19.7%	39.2%
SMRC	2 – 5 May	925	3.30%	34.5%	21.7%	33.3%
Indikator	30 Apr – 5 May	1,200	2.90%	34.8%	21.8%	34.4%
Lembaga Survei Nasional	25 Apr – 2 May	1,230	2.80%	36.5%	24.6%	25.8%
Charta Politika	27 – 30 Apr	1,200	2.83%	33.2%	23.0%	36.6%
Indikator	11 – 17 Apr	1,220	2.90%	31.7%	25.2%	34.0%
Poltracking	9 – 15 Apr	1,220	2.90%	33.0%	22.4%	31.1%
Lembaga Survei Indonesia	31 Mar – 4 Apr	1,229	2.90%	30.3%	25.3%	26.9%
Indikator	12 – 18 Mar	800	3.50%	27.0%	26.8%	36.8%
SMRC	2 – 11 Mar	1,220	3.10%	27.2%	24.8%	35.5%
Populi Center	25 Jan – 3 Feb	1,200	2.83%	28.8%	24.5%	36.3%
Lembaga Survei Indonesia	7 – 11 Jan	1,221	2.9%	23.2%	24.2%	36.3%

==== By province ====
===== Banten =====
Pollster	Fieldwork date	Sample size	Margin of error			
Pollster	Fieldwork date	Sample size	Margin of error	Prabowo Gerindra	Anies Independent	Ganjar PDI-P
Indikator	2 - 10 October	350	5.3%	41.9%	30.6%	25.3%
Lembaga Survei Indonesia	1 – 8 July	Part of national survey	Part of national survey	47.8%	31.7%	15.0%
Lembaga Survei Nasional	24 May – 3 June	Part of national survey	Part of national survey	57.3%	19.2%	19.8%
LSI Denny JA	3 – 14 May	Part of national survey	Part of national survey	48.2%	17.5%	4.3%

===== Jakarta =====
Pollster	Fieldwork date	Sample size	Margin of error			
Pollster	Fieldwork date	Sample size	Margin of error	Prabowo Gerindra	Anies Independent	Ganjar PDI-P
Indikator	2 - 10 October	400	5.0%	27.0%	40.3%	28.4%
Lembaga Survei Indonesia	1 – 8 July	Part of national survey	Part of national survey	24.8%	27.0%	42.9%
Lembaga Survei Nasional	24 May – 3 June	Part of national survey	Part of national survey	27.1%	40.3%	27.5%

===== West Java =====
Pollster	Fieldwork date	Sample size	Margin of error			
Pollster	Fieldwork date	Sample size	Margin of error	Prabowo Gerindra	Anies Independent	Ganjar PDI-P
Indikator	2 - 10 October	400	5.0%	48.7%	29.6%	20.7%
Lembaga Survei Indonesia	1 – 8 July	Part of national survey	Part of national survey	30.2%	38.6%	25.7%
Fixpoll	15 – 23 June	840	3.38%	38.4%	33.7%	15.9%
Lembaga Survei Nasional	24 May – 3 June	Part of national survey	Part of national survey	53.2%	22.5%	20.4%
LSI Denny JA	3 – 14 May	Part of national survey	Part of national survey	29.0%	26.3%	15.0%

===== Central Java =====
Pollster	Fieldwork date	Sample size	Margin of error			
Pollster	Fieldwork date	Sample size	Margin of error	Prabowo Gerindra	Anies Independent	Ganjar PDI-P
Indikator	2 - 10 October	400	5.0%	26.1%	8.3%	63.2%
Lembaga Survei Nasional	24 May – 3 June	Part of national survey	Part of national survey	25.3%	12.8%	58.6%
LSI Denny JA	3 – 14 May	Part of national survey	Part of national survey	20.4%	4.3%	55.2%

===== East Java =====
Pollster	Fieldwork date	Sample size	Margin of error			
Pollster	Fieldwork date	Sample size	Margin of error	Prabowo Gerindra	Anies Independent	Ganjar PDI-P
Indikator	2 - 10 October	400	5.0%	35.8%	12.9%	44.5%
Surabaya Survey Center	25 July – 3 August	1,200	2.83%	37.8%	17.3%	41.5%
ARCI	4 – 15 July	1,250	2.8%	33.7%	23.3%	30.5%
Lembaga Survei Indonesia	1 – 8 July	Part of national survey	Part of national survey	38.4%	10.7%	42.5%
Lembaga Survei Nasional	24 May – 3 June	Part of national survey	Part of national survey	41.2%	13.3%	40.8%
Surabaya Research Syndicate	20 – 30 May	1,000	3.10%	43.5%	12.8%	38.5%
Arus Survei Indonesia	15 – 22 May	800	3.00%	38.2%	12.1%	36.4%
Fixpoll	9 – 16 May	840	3.00%	31.7%	11.9%	32.1%
LSI Denny JA	3 – 14 May	Part of national survey	Part of national survey	20.2%	8.2%	35.3%
ARCI	25 April – 4 May	1,249	2.8%	29.7%	15.2%	28.5%

===== Lampung =====
Pollster	Fieldwork date	Sample size	Margin of error			
Pollster	Fieldwork date	Sample size	Margin of error	Prabowo Gerindra	Anies Independent	Ganjar PDI-P
Indikator	2 - 10 October	300	5.8%	45.9%	17.3%	32.0%
Lembaga Survei Indonesia	19 – 26 June	1,620	3.5%	38.3%	14.9%	39.7%
Lembaga Survei Nasional	24 May – 3 June	Part of national survey	Part of national survey	35.4%	15.5%	40.2%

===== North Sumatra =====
Pollster	Fieldwork date	Sample size	Margin of error			
Pollster	Fieldwork date	Sample size	Margin of error	Prabowo Gerindra	Anies Independent	Ganjar PDI-P
Indikator	2 - 10 October	350	5.3%	37.2%	31.1%	25.3%
Lembaga Survei Nasional	24 May – 3 June	Part of national survey	Part of national survey	42.5%	13.2%	40.6%
LSI Denny JA	3 – 14 May	Part of national survey	Part of national survey	50.0%	32.6%	16.2%

===== West Sumatra =====
Pollster	Fieldwork date	Sample size	Margin of error			
Pollster	Fieldwork date	Sample size	Margin of error	Prabowo Gerindra	Anies Independent	Ganjar PDI-P
Indikator	26 June – 10 July	1620	2.7%	48.0%	39.5%	6.2%

===== South Sumatra =====
Pollster	Fieldwork date	Sample size	Margin of error			
Pollster	Fieldwork date	Sample size	Margin of error	Prabowo Gerindra	Anies Independent	Ganjar PDI-P
Indikator	2 - 10 October	300	5.8%	50.9%	14.7%	22.3%
Lembaga Survei Nasional	24 May – 3 June	Part of national survey	Part of national survey	38.5%	24.3%	28.7%

===== South Sulawesi =====
Pollster	Fieldwork date	Sample size	Margin of error			
Pollster	Fieldwork date	Sample size	Margin of error	Prabowo Gerindra	Anies Independent	Ganjar PDI-P
Indikator	2 - 10 October	300	5.8%	48.5%	34.2%	7.9%
Lembaga Survei Nasional	24 May – 3 June	Part of national survey	Part of national survey	35.6%	26.5%	30.2%

== Second round after candidate nominations ==
=== Prabowo-Gibran vs. Ganjar-Mahfud ===
Pollster	Fieldwork date	Sample size	Margin of error		
Pollster	Fieldwork date	Sample size	Margin of error	Prabowo-Gibran Gerindra	Ganjar-Mahfud PDI-P
Populi Center	29 October - 5 November 2023	1,200	2.83%	59.3%	29.3%
Poltracking	28 October - 3 November 2023	1,220	2.9%	49.9%	32.9%
Indikator	27 October - 1 November 2023	1,220	2.9%	53.6%	33.3%
Charta Politika	26 - 31 October 2023	2,400	2.0%	43.5%	40.6%

=== Prabowo-Gibran vs. Anies-Muhaimin ===
Pollster	Fieldwork date	Sample size	Margin of error		
Pollster	Fieldwork date	Sample size	Margin of error	Prabowo-Gibran Gerindra	Anies-Muhaimin Independent
Populi Center	29 October - 5 November 2023	1,200	2.83%	59.8%	28.6%
Poltracking	28 October - 3 November 2023	1,220	2.9%	55.8%	28.8%
Indikator	27 October - 1 November 2023	1,220	2.9%	58.0%	28.6%
Charta Politika	26 - 31 October 2023	2,400	2.0%	50.3%	29.0%

=== Ganjar-Mahfud vs. Anies-Muhaimin ===
Pollster	Fieldwork date	Sample size	Margin of error		
Pollster	Fieldwork date	Sample size	Margin of error	Ganjar-Mahfud PDI-P	Anies-Muhaimin Independent
Populi Center	29 October - 5 November 2023	1,200	2.83%	47.0%	39.6%
Poltracking	28 October - 3 November 2023	1,220	2.9%	40.9%	33.1%
Indikator	27 October - 1 November 2023	1,220	2.9%	46.7%	37.0%
Charta Politika	26 - 31 October 2023	2,400	2.0%	45.5%	34.4%

== Second round before candidate nominations ==
=== Prabowo vs. Ganjar ===
Pollster	Fieldwork date	Sample size	Margin of error		
Pollster	Fieldwork date	Sample size	Margin of error	Prabowo Gerindra	Ganjar PDI-P
Charta Politika	26 - 31 October 2023	2,400	2.0%	44.4%	40.8%
Lembaga Survei Indonesia	16 - 18 October 2023	1,229	2.9%	48.9%	32.8%
Indikator	2 - 10 October 2023	1,200	2.9%	51.5%	37.8%
Lembaga Survei Indonesia	2 - 8 October 2023	1,620	2.5%	49.2%	37.8%
SMRC	31 July - 11 August 2023	4,260	1.65%	44.5%	41.5%
Lembaga Survei Indonesia	3 - 9 August 2023	1,220	2.90%	47.3%	42.2%
Indikator	15 - 21 July 2023	1,811	2.35%	47.0%	39.6%
LSI Denny JA	3 – 15 July 2023	1,200	2.90%	52.0%	41.6%
Lembaga Survei Indonesia	1 – 8 July 2023	1,242	2.80%	48.1%	38.1%
Indikator	20 – 24 June 2023	1,220	2.90%	49.5%	40.9%
Indopol	5 – 11 June 2023	1,240	2.85%	42.9%	36.94%
Indikator	26 – 30 May 2023	1,230	2.90%	50.5%	39.3%
LSI Denny JA	3 – 14 May 2023	1,200	2.90%	50.4%	43.2%
Litbang Kompas	29 April - 10 May 2023	1,200	2.83%	51.1%	48.9%
SMRC	2 - 5 May 2023	925	3.30%	41.9%	42.2%
Lembaga Survei Nasional	25 April - 2 May 2023	1230	2.80%	51.6%	38.5%
SMRC	25 - 28 April 2023	1,021	3.10%	45.7%	38.1%
Lembaga Survei Indonesia	12 - 17 April 2023	1220	2.90%	49.2%	39.7%
Indikator	11 - 17 April 2023	1220	2.90%	46.8%	40.0%
Indikator	12 - 18 March 2023	800	3.50%	40.9%	41.8%
Indikator	9 - 16 February 2023	1,200	2.90%	37.5%	45.0%
Litbang Kompas	25 January - 4 February 2023	1,202	2.83%	43.3%	56.7%
Litbang Kompas	24 September - 7 October 2022	1,200	2.8%	47.1%	52.9%
Poltracking Indonesia	16-22 May 2022	1,220	2.9%	33.4%	32.5%
Indo Barometer	9–15 January 2020	1,200	2.83%	47.7%	18.8%

==== By province ====
===== Banten =====
Pollster	Fieldwork date	Sample size	Margin of error		
Pollster	Fieldwork date	Sample size	Margin of error	Prabowo Gerindra	Ganjar PDI-P
Indopol	5 – 11 June 2023	Part of national survey	Part of national survey	36.0%	22.0%
LSI Denny JA	3 – 14 May 2023	Part of national survey	Part of national survey	82.2%	16.9%

===== West Java =====
Pollster	Fieldwork date	Sample size	Margin of error		
Pollster	Fieldwork date	Sample size	Margin of error	Prabowo Gerindra	Ganjar PDI-P
Indopol	5 – 11 June 2023	Part of national survey	Part of national survey	42.5%	24.5%
LSI Denny JA	3 – 14 May 2023	Part of national survey	Part of national survey	70.6%	28.1%

===== Central Java =====
Pollster	Fieldwork date	Sample size	Margin of error		
Pollster	Fieldwork date	Sample size	Margin of error	Prabowo Gerindra	Ganjar PDI-P
LSI Denny JA	3 – 14 May 2023	Part of national survey	Part of national survey	17.8%	80.6%

===== East Java =====
Pollster	Fieldwork date	Sample size	Margin of error		
Pollster	Fieldwork date	Sample size	Margin of error	Prabowo Gerindra	Ganjar PDI-P
Indopol	5 – 11 June 2023	Part of national survey	Part of national survey	45.6%	41.7%
LSI Denny JA	3 – 14 May	Part of national survey	Part of national survey	26.2%	49.7%

===== Jakarta =====
Pollster	Fieldwork date	Sample size	Margin of error		
Pollster	Fieldwork date	Sample size	Margin of error	Prabowo Gerindra	Ganjar PDI-P
Indopol	5 – 11 June 2023	Part of national survey	Part of national survey	30.0%	18.0%

===== Lampung =====
Pollster	Fieldwork date	Sample size	Margin of error		
Pollster	Fieldwork date	Sample size	Margin of error	Prabowo Gerindra	Ganjar PDI-P
Lembaga Survei Indonesia	19 – 26 June 2023	1,620	3.5%	47.7%	41.8%

===== North Sumatra =====
Pollster	Fieldwork date	Sample size	Margin of error		
Pollster	Fieldwork date	Sample size	Margin of error	Prabowo Gerindra	Ganjar PDI-P
LSI Denny JA	3 – 14 May 2023	Part of national survey	Part of national survey	70.8%	28.3%

===== West Sumatra =====
Pollster	Fieldwork date	Sample size	Margin of error		
Pollster	Fieldwork date	Sample size	Margin of error	Prabowo Gerindra	Ganjar PDI-P
Indikator	26 June – 10 July 2023	1620	2.7%	70.5%	9.4%

=== Prabowo vs. Anies ===
Pollster	Fieldwork date	Sample size	Margin of error		
Pollster	Fieldwork date	Sample size	Margin of error	Prabowo Gerindra	Anies Independent
Charta Politika	26 - 31 October 2023	2,400	2.0%	50.1%	29.5%
Lembaga Survei Indonesia	16 - 18 October 2023	1,229	2.9%	54.8%	23.8%
Indikator	2 - 10 October 2023	1,200	2.9%	55.7%	29.1%
Lembaga Survei Indonesia	2 - 8 October 2023	1,620	2.5%	52.6%	33.0%
SMRC	31 July - 11 August 2023	4,260	1.65%	52.0%	30.2%
Lembaga Survei Indonesia	3 - 9 August 2023	1,220	2.90%	53.1%	31.5%
Indikator	15 - 21 July 2023	1,811	2.35%	51.2%	33.5%
Lembaga Survei Indonesia	1 – 8 July 2023	1,242	2.80%	50.9%	27.9%
Indikator	20 – 24 June 2023	1,220	2.90%	56.2%	29.6%
Indikator	26 – 30 May 2023	1,230	2.90%	56.8%	26.5%
Litbang Kompas	29 April - 10 May 2023	1,200	2.83%	62.0%	38.0%
SMRC	2 - 5 May 2023	925	3.30%	46.4%	31.5%
Lembaga Survei Nasional	25 April - 2 May 2023	1230	2.80%	56.4%	37.2%
Lembaga Survei Indonesia	12 - 17 April 2023	1220	2.90%	51.7%	35.8%
Indikator	11 - 17 April 2023	1220	2.90%	49.3%	33.7%
Indikator	12-18 March 2023	800	3.50%	45.0%	37.4%
Indikator	9-16 February 2023	1,200	2.90%	42.7%	39.4%
Litbang Kompas	25 January - 4 February 2023	1,202	2.83%	57.3%	42.7%
Populi Center	25 January - 3 February 2023	1,200	2.83%	43.8%	37.3%
Populi Center	9-17 October 2022	1,200	2.83%	38.3%	40.8%
Litbang Kompas	24 September - 7 October 2022	1,200	2.8%	52.1%	47.9%
Poltracking Indonesia	16-22 May 2022	1,220	2.9%	36%	20.8%
Indo Barometer	9–15 January 2020	1,200	2.83%	41.4%	23.3%

==== By Province ====
===== West Sumatra =====
Pollster	Fieldwork date	Sample size	Margin of error		
Pollster	Fieldwork date	Sample size	Margin of error	Prabowo Gerindra	Anies Independent
Indikator	26 June – 10 July 2023	1620	2.7%	49.2%	42.3%

=== Ganjar vs. Anies ===
Pollster	Fieldwork date	Sample size	Margin of error		
Pollster	Fieldwork date	Sample size	Margin of error	Ganjar PDI-P	Anies Independent
Charta Politika	26 - 31 October 2023	2,400	2.0%	45.6%	34.8%
Lembaga Survei Indonesia	16 - 18 October 2023	1,229	2.9%	47.2%	33.1%
Indikator	2 - 10 October 2023	1,200	2.9%	46.6%	36.5%
Lembaga Survei Indonesia	2 - 8 October 2023	1,620	2.5%	47.1%	37.5%
SMRC	31 July - 11 August 2023	4,260	1.65%	49.6%	32.8%
Lembaga Survei Indonesia	3 - 9 August 2023	1,220	2.90%	51.6%	32.6%
Indikator	15 - 21 July 2023	1,811	2.35%	48.3%	37.1%
Lembaga Survei Indonesia	1 – 8 July 2023	1,242	2.80%	48.0%	34.1%
Indikator	20 – 24 June 2023	1,220	2.90%	52.5%	35.7%
Indikator	26 – 30 May 2023	1,230	2.90%	51.0%	34.5%
Litbang Kompas	29 April - 10 May 2023	1,200	2.83%	59.9%	40.1%
SMRC	2 - 5 May 2023	925	3.30%	49.3%	33.6%
Lembaga Survei Nasional	25 April - 2 May 2023	1230	2.80%	40.2%	39.6%
Lembaga Survei Indonesia	12 - 17 April 2023	1220	2.90%	46.7%	39.2%
Indikator	11 - 17 April 2023	1220	2.90%	44.7%	37.9%
Indikator	12 - 18 March 2023	800	3.50%	45.2%	37.6%
Indikator	9 - 16 February 2023	1,200	2.90%	46.6%	39.8%
Litbang Kompas	25 January - 4 February 2023	1,202	2.83%	60.2%	39.8%
Populi Center	25 January - 3 February 2023	1,200	2.83%	47.3%	35.4%
SMRC	3-11 December 2022	1,220	3.1%	43.3%	40.5%
Populi Center	9-17 October 2022	1,200	2.83%	38.5%	41.5%
Litbang Kompas	24 September - 7 October 2022	1,200	2.8%	52.8%	47.2%
Poltracking Indonesia	16-22 May 2022	1,220	2.9%	33.8%	25.2%

=== Other hypothetical matchups ===
==== Prabowo vs. RK ====
Pollster	Fieldwork date	Sample size	Margin of error		
Pollster	Fieldwork date	Sample size	Margin of error	Prabowo Gerindra	RK Independent
Indo Barometer	9–15 January 2020	1,200	2.83%	46.7%	17.8%

==== Prabowo vs. Khofifah ====
Pollster	Fieldwork date	Sample size	Margin of error		
Pollster	Fieldwork date	Sample size	Margin of error	Prabowo Gerindra	Khofifah PKB
Indo Barometer	9–15 January 2020	1,200	2.83%	48.0%	17.1%

==== Prabowo vs. Puan ====
Pollster	Fieldwork date	Sample size	Margin of error		
Pollster	Fieldwork date	Sample size	Margin of error	Prabowo Gerindra	Puan PDI-P
Indo Barometer	9–15 January 2020	1,200	2.83%	46.9%	13.9%

==== Prabowo vs. Airlangga ====
Pollster	Fieldwork date	Sample size	Margin of error		
Pollster	Fieldwork date	Sample size	Margin of error	Prabowo Gerindra	Airlangga Golkar
Indo Barometer	9–15 January 2020	1,200	2.83%	50.9%	7.2%

==== Prabowo vs. Nadiem ====
Pollster	Fieldwork date	Sample size	Margin of error		
Pollster	Fieldwork date	Sample size	Margin of error	Prabowo Gerindra	Nadiem Independent
Indo Barometer	9–15 January 2020	1,200	2.83%	50.4%	10.5%

==== Prabowo vs. Erick ====
Pollster	Fieldwork date	Sample size	Margin of error		
Pollster	Fieldwork date	Sample size	Margin of error	Prabowo Gerindra	Erick Independent
Indo Barometer	9–15 January 2020	1,200	2.83%	49.3%	13.0%

== Open ==
=== 2023 ===
Pollster	Fieldwork date	Sample size	Margin of error						
Pollster	Fieldwork date	Sample size	Margin of error	Prabowo Gerindra	Anies Independent	Ganjar PDI-P	AHY Demokrat	RK Golkar	Airlangga Golkar
Lembaga Survei Nasional	10 – 19 July	1,420	2.60%	38.2%	21.4%	28.5%	-	-	2.4%
Lembaga Survei Indonesia	1 – 8 July	1,242	2.80%	25.3%	15.4%	25.1%	1.6%	4.3%	0.5%
Indikator	20 – 24 June	1,220	2.90%	31.6%	17.6%	31.4%	0.6%	4.0%	0.7%
Political Weather Station	10 – 18 June	1,200	2.83%	32.8%	16.5%	27.1%	-	4.7%	1.9%
Populi Center	5 – 12 June	1,200	2.83%	19.3%	14.4%	21.9%	0.2%	1.3%	0.3%
Indopol	5 – 11 June	1,240	2.85%	28.79%	23.87%	27.50%	1.05%	3.23%	0.32%
Algoritma	29 May - 10 June	2,009	2.1%	24.6%	16.9%	29.3%	1.5%	2.3%	0.5%
Indikator	26 – 30 May	1,230	2.90%	25.3%	12.5%	25.2%	1.9%	4.9%	0.5%
Litbang Kompas	29 April - 10 May 2023	1,200	2.83%	24.5%	13.6%	22.8%	1.2%	5.8%	-
Charta Politika	2 - 7 May	1,220	2.82%	28.1%	21.4%	34.6%	0.9%	4.8%	0.7%
SMRC	30 April - 7 May	1,220	3.10%	17.2%	10.7%	24.6%	0.2%	2.7%	0.1%
Indikator	30 April - 5 May	1200	2.90%	24.2%	15.0%	29.3%	2.1%	4.7%	0.6%
Lembaga Survei Nasional	25 April - 2 May	1230	2.80%	31.8%	18.2%	18.6%	2.4%	6.5%	1.8%
Charta Politika	27 - 30 April	1200	2.83%	22.3%	15.2%	28.9%	3.4%	6.4%	1.1%
SMRC	25 - 28 April	1,021	3.10%	29.5%	19.8%	30.4%	-	-	2.9%
Lembaga Survei Indonesia	12 - 17 April	1220	2.90%	28.3%	21.0%	27.3%	2.8%	7.0%	0.7%
Indikator	11 - 17 April	1220	2.90%	26.7%	19.7%	28.5%	2.1%	6.9%	1.3%
Poltracking	9 - 15 April	1,220	2.90%	30.1%	20.4%	28.3%	2.8%	3.3%	0.7%
SMRC	11 - 14 April	1,216	2.90%	22.5%	15.0%	24.3%	1.5%	6.8%	0.5%
Lembaga Survei Indonesia	31 March-4 April	1,229	2.90%	19.3%	18.4%	19.8%	2.0%	5.8%	0.9%
Indikator	12 - 18 March	800	3.50%	21.7%	21.7%	30.8%	1.6%	6.3%	0.2%
SMRC	2 - 11 March	1,220	3.10%	17.6%	16.7%	26.6%	1.6%	5.6%	0.6%
Roy Morgan	January - March	2,339	?	16.5%	15.5%	28%	5.5%	8%	1%
Litbang Kompas	25 January - 4 February	1,202	2.83%	18.1%	13.1%	25.3%	-	8.4%	-
Populi Center	25 January - 3 February	1,200	2.83%	17.1%	10.8%	19.8%	-	5.1%	-
Lembaga Survei Indonesia	7-11 January	1,221	2.9%	16.0%	16.8%	27.2%	2.4%	7.2%	1.0%

=== 2022 ===
Pollster	Fieldwork date	Sample size	Margin of error											
Pollster	Fieldwork date	Sample size	Margin of error	Prabowo Gerindra	Anies Independent	Ganjar PDI-P	Sandiaga Gerindra	AHY Demokrat	RK Independent	Khofifah PKB	Risma PDI-P	Mahfud Independent	Puan PDI-P	Erick Independent
Charta Politika	8-16 December	1,220	2.83%	23.0%	23.9%	31.7%	2.0%	2.3%	5.8%	1.2%	-	-	1.5%	1.1%
SMRC	3-11 December	1,220	3.1%	16.8%	18.6%	26.5%	1.4%	1.1%	6.0%	0.6%	0.6%	0.6%	0.6%	1.0%
SPIN	1-10 December	1,230	2.8%	31.8%	19.7%	20.1%	1.2%	3.2%	9.7%	2.4%	-	-	2.4%	1.6%
Lembaga Survei Jakarta	15-26 November	1,220	2.81%	32.2%	20.5%	19.7%	2.9%	4.7%	7.8%	-	-	-	2.5%	3.8%
SMRC	5-13 November	1,220	3.1%	18.8%	17%	26.7%	-	-	-	-	-	-	-	-
Charta Politika	4–12 November	1,200	2.83%	22%	23.1%	32.6%	–	–	–	–	–	–	–	–
Lembaga Survei Nasional	29 October – 2 November	1,230	2.79%	30.2%	20.8%	22.5%	–	–	–	–	–	–	–	–
Indonesia Polling Stations	7–17 October	1,200	2.83%	30.7%	17.6%	20.5%	2.3%	5.2%	8.2%	–	–	–	2%	4.8%
Litbang Kompas	24 September - 7 October	1,200	2.8%	17.6%	16.5%	23.2%	-	-	-	-	-	-	-	-
Charta Politika Indonesia	25 May – 2 June	1,200	2.8%	23.4%	20%	31.2%	3.6%	3.3%	4.6%	2.9%	–	–	1.8%	2%
Poltracking Indonesia	16–22 May	1,220	2.9%	26.8%	19.8%	30.6%	18.2%	14.1%	11.4%	–	–	–	7.2%	16%
INDOMETER	20–27 April	1,200	2.98%	22.5%	12.8%	22.1%	5.3%	4.5%	8.6%	3.1%	2.3%	1%	1.7%	4%
Charta Politika	10–17 April	1,220	2.83%	23%	20.2%	29.2%	4.9%	3.4%	–	3.3%	–	–	1.8%	1.5%
SPIN	28 March – 7 April	1,230	2.8%	26.5%	13.9%	17.2%	–	–	–	–	–	–	–	–
Charta Politika Indonesia	20–24 March	1,200	2.83%	19.6%	12.6%	16%	9.3%	4.8%	8.1%	–	5.3%	3.8%	1.2%	2.1%
Indonesia Polling Stations	8–18 March	1,220	2.8%	27.4%	15.9%	18.9%	7.2%	2.8%	6.2%	–	–	1.2%	0.6%	2.5%
Indikator Politik Indonesia	4–10 March	1,200	2.9%	9.5%	15.2%	13.7%	9.8%	4.1%	10.2%	0.7%	–	0.2%	1.1%	1.5%
Lembaga Survey Jakarta	18–28 February	1,225	2.8%	27.2%	15.2%	16.3%	7.9%	–	5.8%	–	–	–	–	–
Lembaga Survey Nasional	12–24 February	1,537	2.5%	21.9%	19.2%	18.8%	8.7%	2.6%	7.5%	–	–	0.9%	0.3%	2.8%
Indikator Politik Indonesia	11–21 February	1,200	2.9%	27.4%	22%	27.6%	–	6.7%	–	–	–	–	1.8%	2.4%
DTS Indonesia	7–20 February	2,060	2.1%	18%	20.4%	28.7%	5%	2.7%	7.4%	–	3.2%	–	0.6%	0.8%
Litbang Kompas	17–30 January	1,200	2.8%	26.5%	14.2%	20.5%	4.9%	3.7%	2.6%	–	2.6%	1.1%	0.6%	1.1%

=== October 2020 – December 2021 ===
Pollster	Fieldwork date	Sample size	Margin of error												
Pollster	Fieldwork date	Sample size	Margin of error	Prabowo Gerindra	Anies Independent	Ganjar PDI-P	Sandiaga Gerindra	AHY Demokrat	RK Independent	Khofifah PKB	Risma PDI-P	Mahfud Independent	Puan PDI-P	Giring PSI	Erick Independent
Saiful Mujani Research & Consulting	8–16 December 2021	2,062	2.2%	19.7%	13.4%	19.2%	3.5%	3.7%	3.3%	-	1.6%	-	-	-	-
Indikator Politik Indonesia	6-11 December 2021	1,220	2.9%	24.1%	15.1%	20.8%	3.9%	6.8%	5.5%	1.9%	3.2%	0.9%	1.8%	-	1%
Arus Survei Indonesia	26 August – 3 September 2021	1,200	2.9%	17.1%	14.5%	10.9%	8.5%	8.1%	8.2%	2.5%	3.6%	–	–	–	–
SPIN	7–21 August 2021	1,670	2.4%	21.9%	16.1%	15.6%	4.9%	8.7%	5%	–	–	–	–	–	–
Indonesia Politica; Opinion	2–10 August 2021	1,200	2.5%	7.8%	18.7%	16.5%	13.5%	9.9%	6.2%	-	-	-	-	-	4.7%
New Indonesia; Research & Consulting	21–30 July 2021	1,200	2.89%	16.7%	6.0%	20.5%	5.2%	5.8%	16.1%	2.1%	4.7%	1.0%	1.4%	2.6%	4.5%
Voxpol Center	22 June – 1 July 2021	1,200	2.83%	18.9%	14.1%	19.2%	8.3%	5.4%	5.8%	–	–	-	1.3%	-	–
CISA	27 May – 1 June 2021	1,600	2.85%	10.26%	19.20%	15.33%	–	15.51%	7.55%	1.35%	–	-	-	-	9.76%
Indonesia Elections and Strategic (indEX) Research	21–30 May 2021	1,200	2.90%	18.5%	7.1%	16.7%	6.3%	6.7%	13.4%	2.0%	4.5%	1.5%	1.2%	2.3%	4.8%
Indometer	27 April – 3 May 2021	1,200	2.98%	17.4%	5.9%	19.1%	6.1%	4.6%	14.5%	3.0%	4.4%	1.1%	1.3%	2.6%	4.0%
Litbang Kompas	13–26 April 2021	1,200	2.90%	21.3%	11.7%	10.1%	4.7%	4.4%	3.6%	–	3.6%	1.2%	–	–	–
Indikator	13–17 April 2021	1,200	2.90%	11.1%	14.6%	15.7%	8.1%	6.4%	10.0%	2.8%	–	0.6%	2.9%	–	0.6%
LP3ES	8–15 April 2021	1,200	2.80%	16.4%	12.8%	9.6%	6.2%	8.8%	7.5%	1.1%	4.3%	–	0.5%	–	0.7%
Charta Politika	20–24 March 2021	1,200	2.90%	22.2%	14.2%	20.0%	12.7%	–	9.2%	–	–	–	–	–	–
Charta Politika	20–24 March 2021	1,200	2.90%	19.6%	12.6%	16.0%	9.3%	4.8%	8.1%	–	5.3%	3.8%	1.2%	–	2.1%
CPCS	5–15 March 2021	1,200	2.90%	20.6%	5.1%	14.7%	5.4%	6.3%	15.2%	2.2%	3.7%	1.1%	1.3%	2.0%	5.6%
indEX	25 February – 5 March 2021	1,200	2.90%	20.4%	6.3%	13.5%	6.8%	7.0%	14.1%	2.7%	4.6%	1.6%	1.3%	2.1%	3.3%
Charta Politika	24–28 February 2021	1,200	2.90%	22.0%	14.3%	18.1%	12.1%	–	9.5%	–	–	–	–	–	–
Charta Politika	26–29 January 2021	1,200	2.90%	22.1%	13.9%	18.6%	12.7%	–	9.9%	–	–	–	–	–	–
Lembaga Survei Indonesia	25–31 January 2021	1,200	2.90%	22.5%	10.2%	10.6%	6.9%	4.8%	5.0%	1.8%	5.5%	0.9%	0.1%	–	0.6%
Vox Populi	26–31 December 2020	1,200	2.90%	18.9%	7.7%	18.5%	6.5%	4.3%	12.8%	5.4%	4.1%	1.0%	1.4%	2.4%	2.1%
Saiful Mujani Research and Consulting	23–26 December 2020	1,202	2.90%	14.9%	11.0%	15.7%	7.9%	3.1%	7.1%	–	3.1%	–	–	–	–
Center for Political Communication Studies	11–20 November 2020	1,200	2.90%	19.2%	6.6%	16.0%	5.8%	1.9%	9.3%	3.8%	1.4%	1.0%	1.1%	1.7%	2.7%
Indonesia Elections and Strategic (indEX) Research	8–12 November 2020	1,200	2.90%	22.3%	4.7%	15.2%	5.1%	2.1%	7.8%	3.9%	2.7%	1.3%	–	1.9%	2.2%
Populi Center	21–30 October 2020	1,000	3.10%	18.3%	9.5%	9.9%	4.8%	3.8%	5.8%	2.2%	4.2%	–	–	–	2.1%
Y-Publica	11–20 October 2020	1,200	2.89%	16.5%	8.6%	16.1%	8.1%	2.2%	11.8%	4.5%	3.1%	1.5%	1.1%	1.6%	3.3%
Indometer	25 September – 5 October 2020	1,200	2.98%	16.8%	8.9%	16.5%	7.7%	2.9%	10.6%	3.8%	2.1%	1.3%	1.1%	1.9%	2.3%

=== January–September 2020 ===
Pollster	Fieldwork date	Sample size	Margin of error											
Pollster	Fieldwork date	Sample size	Margin of error	Prabowo Gerindra	Anies Independent	Ganjar PDI-P	Sandiaga Gerindra	AHY Demokrat	RK Independent	Khofifah PKB	Risma PDI-P	Mahfud Independent	Puan PDI-P	Erick Independent
Indikator	24–30 September 2020	1,200	2.9%	16.8%	14.4%	18.7%	8.8%	4.2%	7.6%	4.0%	-	1.3%	0.9%	0.8%
Vox Populi	11–20 September 2020	1,200	2.9%	17.1%	9.4%	17.6%	8.5%	2.1%	13.2%	5.6%	3.8%	1.2%	1.7%	2.0%
Polmatrix	1–10 September 2020	2,000	2.2%	18.5%	10.6%	13.9%	8.4%	2.5%	11.1%	5.2%	1.6%	1.0%	-	1.2%
Indometer	11–20 July 2020	1,200	2.98%	17.6%	10.1%	15.4%	8.8%	3.3%	11.3%	4.1%	2.9%	1.4%	1.2%	1.8%
Indikator	13–16 July 2020	1,200	2.9%	13.5%	15.0%	16.2%	9.2%	6.8%	8.6%	3.6%	-	0.8%	2.0%	1.0%
Charta Politika	6–12 July 2020	2,000	2.19%	17.5%	15.0%	15.9%	11.2%	4.0%	10.1%	1.7%	2.1%	1.3%	-	2.1%
Y-Publica	1–10 July 2020	1,200	2.89%	17.3%	9.7%	15.2%	8.5%	2.6%	12.1%	3.7%	3.4%	1.3%	1.2%	2.9%
Center for Political Communication Studies	21–30 June 2020	1,200	2.9%	18.4%	10.6%	13.5%	9.3%	1.8%	11.3%	3.4%	3.3%	1.4%	2.4%	3.1%
Survey and Polling Indonesia	14–21 June 2020	1,100	2.83%	15.2%	12.6%	10.8%	9.5%	5.9%	8.1%	6.2%	3.6%	-	1.1%	3.0%
New Indonesia Research & Consulting	8–18 June 2020	1,200	2.89%	18.9%	9.8%	14.3%	8.9%	2.7%	11.0%	4.5%	1.6%	1.2%	1.1%	1.3%
Indikator	16–18 May 2020	1,200	2.9%	14.1%	10.4%	11.8%	6.0%	4.8%	7.7%	4.3%	-	3.3%	-	1.6%
Polmatrix	1–7 May 2020	2,000	2.2%	18.9%	12.8%	13.7%	8.6%	2.7%	7.9%	5.6%	3.0%	1.6%	1.1%	3.6%
indEX	23–29 April 2020	1,200	2.9%	21.1%	13.7%	14.1%	10.2%	2.3%	8.9%	2.7%	5.3%	1.5%	-	6,3%
Y-Publica	11–20 March 2020	1,200	2.89%	23.7%	14.7%	8.0%	10.3%	1.6%	4.9%	0.9%	3.6%	2.9%	1.1%	4.1%
Charta Politika	20–27 February 2020	1,200	2.83%	19.3%	15.3%	10.8%	7.3%	6.8%	5.3%	2.3%	4.7%	2.4%	-	2.3%
Indikator	4–10 February 2020	1,200	2.9%	22.2%	12.1%	9.1%	9.5%	6.5%	3.8%	5.7%	-	3.8%	-	1.9%
Median	1–14 February 2020	1,200	2.8%	18.8%	15.8%	5.5%	9.6%	8.3%	5.7%	5.4%	3.3%	3.3%	1.1%	1.3%
PPI-PRC	Early February 2020	2,197	2.13%	17.3%	7.8%	8.8%	9.1%	5.4%	4.7%	-	2.6%	2.4%	-	-
Cyrus Network	24–30 January 2020	1,230	2.85%	23.8%	13.2%	13.0%	18.8%	-	8.2%	5.8%	-	-	-	-
Indo Barometer	9–15 January 2020	1,200	2.83%	22.5%	14.3%	7.7%	8.1%	5.7%	2.6%	3.3%	6.8%	1.6%	1.0%	2.5%
2019 election	17 April 2019	—N/a	—N/a	44.5%	Did not participate		Running as Prabowo's running mate	Did not participate						

== See also ==
- Opinion polling for the 2024 Indonesian legislative election
