= Grace Natalie =

Founder of the Indonesian Solidarity Party

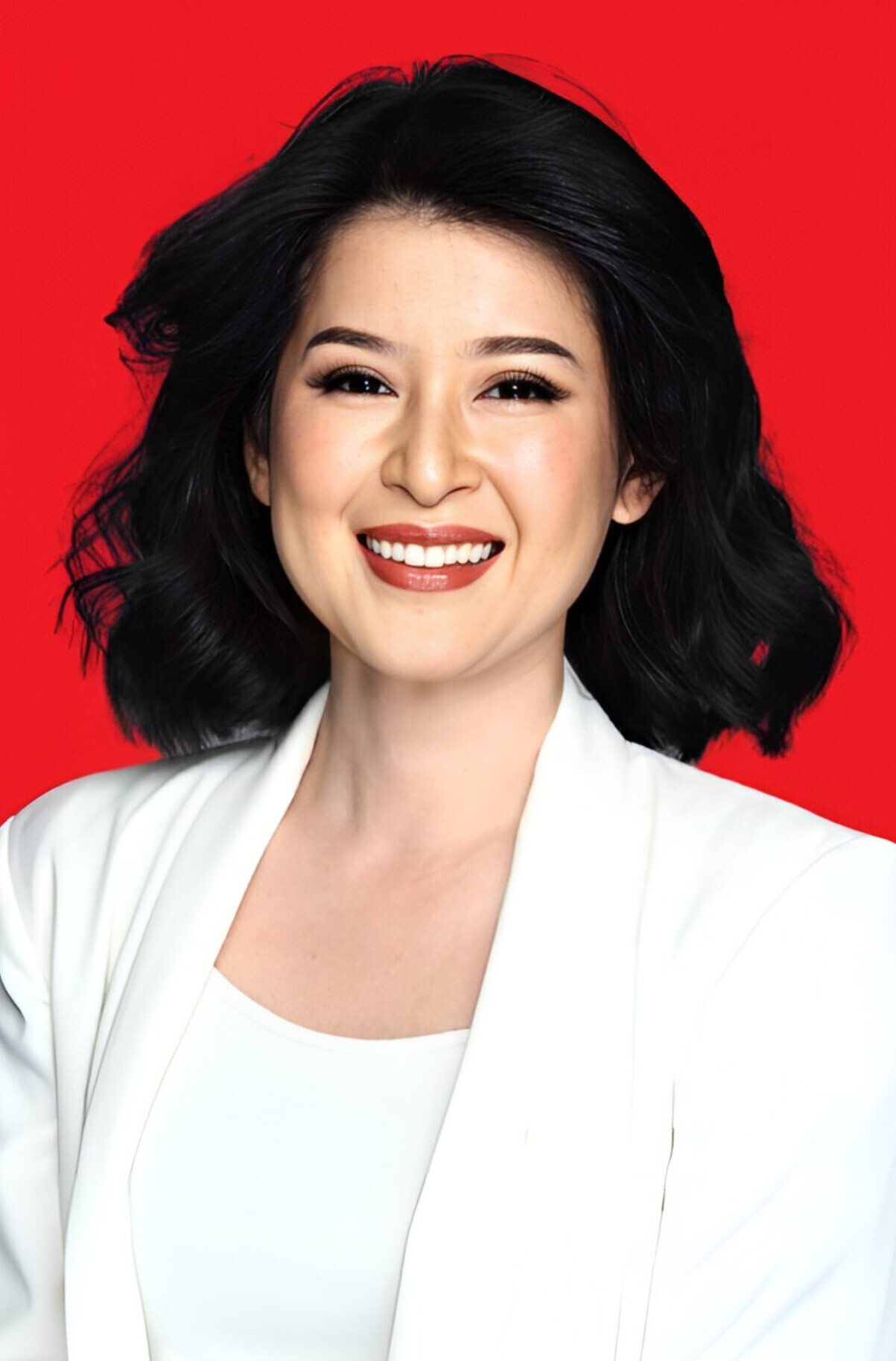
- Electoral portrait, 2023

1st General Chairman of the Indonesian Solidarity Party
- In office 16 November 2014 – 16 November 2021
- Preceded by: Office established
- Succeeded by: Giring Ganesha

Personal details
- Born: Grace Natalie Louisa; 4 July 1982 (age 44) Jakarta, Indonesia
- Party: PSI
- Spouse: Kevin Osmond (m. 2011)
- Education: Kwik Kian Gie School of Business (S.E.); Lee Kuan Yew School of Public Policy (MPA)
- Occupation: Politician; journalist

Grace Natalie Louisa (born 4 July 1982) is an Indonesian politician and former television newsreader and journalist. She is one of co-founders of the Indonesian Solidarity Party (PSI) in 2014, and was its leader until 2021.

== Education ==
Grace Natalie completed high school at SMAK 3 BPK Penabur, Jakarta. She then majored in accounting at the Institute of Business and Informatics Indonesia. She was a teaching assistant and also a Sunday school teacher in church.

Her introduction to journalism came when SCTV network held its SCTV Goes to Campus competition in search of graduates to train as journalists. Grace won the Jakarta division of the competition and went on to reach the top five nationally.

== TV career ==
After completing her studies, Grace was recruited by SCTV and became a presenter on its flagship news show Liputan 6. In her early years as a television journalist, she covered crime, politics, business and other current affairs. She said it was difficult to adapt to the highly dynamic world of television with unpredictable working hours. But that did not dampen her spirit, and she gradually fell in love with the world of journalism. Within three years, she moved to ANTV and then to tvOne.

== Post-TV career and politics ==
In June 2012, Grace left tvOne to become chief executive officer of Saiful Mujani Research and Consulting, saying she wanted to try a new challenge. In 2014, she entered politics and is now chairwoman of the Indonesian Solidarity Party (PSI), which competed in Indonesia's 2019 general election. Following the release of quick count results that indicated that PSI would fail to qualify for the People's Representative Council, Grace released a statement conceding the loss and vowing to continue supporting incumbent president Joko Widodo. This was despite Grace having received 179,949 votes, the highest in Jakarta's electoral district No. 3, where she won by a significant margin (in second place, Prosperous Justice Party member Adang Daradjatun received 111,549 votes).
