= Mohamad Guntur Romli =

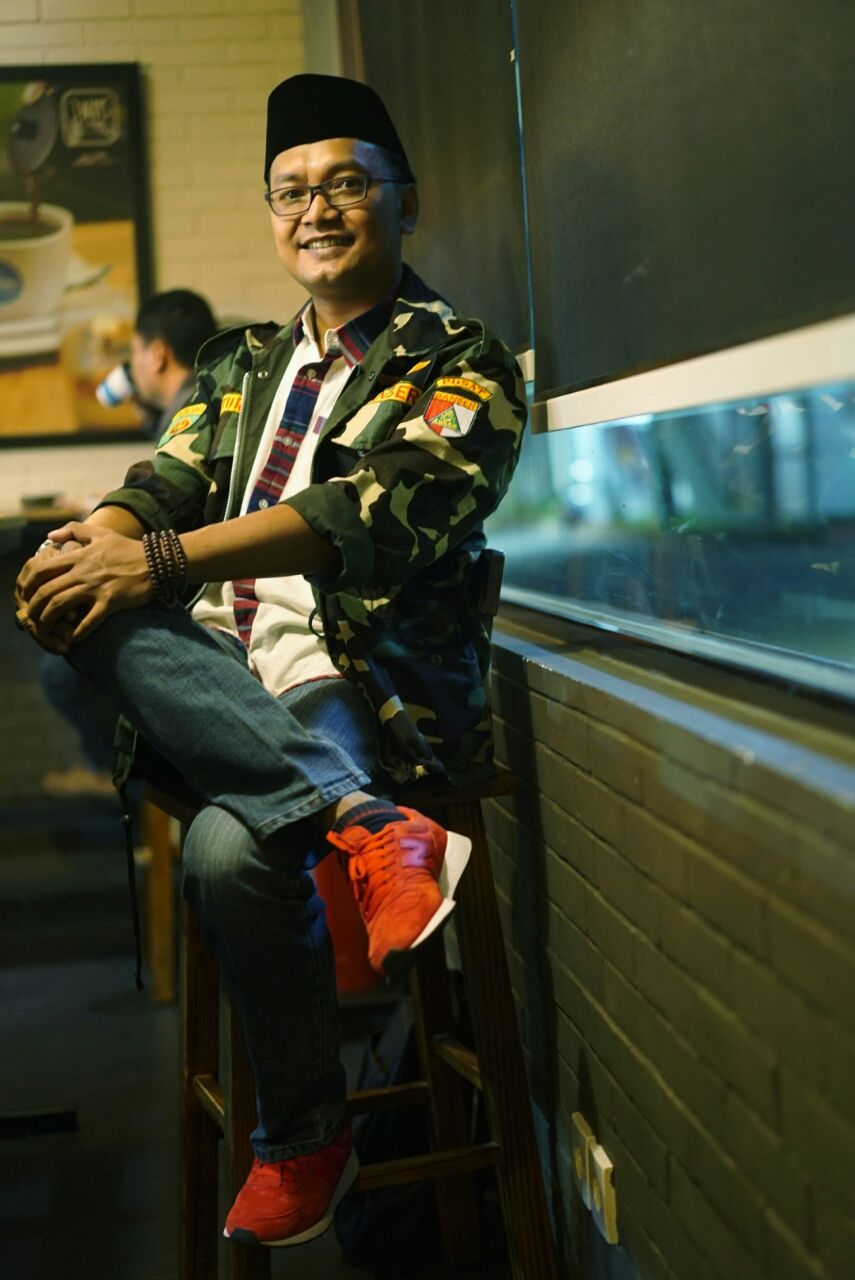
- Born: Mohamad Guntur Romli; March 17, 1978 (age 48); Situbondo, East Java, Indonesia
- Other name: GunRomli
- Political party: Partai Kebangkitan Bangsa (2000–2004); Partai Solidaritas Indonesia (2017–2023); Partai Demokrasi Indonesia Perjuangan (2023–present)
- Website: gunromli.com

H. Mohamad Guntur Romli (born 17 March 1978) is an Indonesian writer, Nahdlatul Ulama activist, and politician, he is currently the Chairman of Ganjarian Spartan Ganjar Pranowo. He studied at Al-Azhar University, Cairo, Egypt.

== Education and career ==
He completed his primary and secondary education and Islamic education in his father's pesantren and graduated in 1992. Until 1997 he continued his education at Tarbiyatul Muallimin al-Islamiyah Pondok Pesantren Al-Amien Prenduan, Sumenep, East Java.

From 1997 to 1998 he was an auxiliary teacher (ustadz) at his alma mater while studying at the Al-Amien Higher Islamic Boarding School (PTA) and the Al-Amien College of Islamic Studies (STIDA), Faculty of Tarbiyah. He was also the person in charge of the Arabic language magazine "Al-Wafa". In 1998, he received a scholarship from Al-Azhar University to continue his Islamic studies, and he entered the Faculty of Ushuluddin, Department of Aqidah Falsafah, Al-Azhar University, Cairo, Egypt.

== Personal life ==
His father, K.H. Achmad Zaini Romli, is the caretaker of Darul Aitam Arromli Islamic Boarding School, Jangkar, Situbondo and his mother, Hj. Sri Sungkawa Ningsih, is a teacher. He is married to Nong Darol Mahmada, a female activist, and has two daughters.

== Written works ==
- Ustadz, Saya Sudah di Surga (2007)
- Muslim Feminis: Polemik Kemunduran dan Kebangkitan Islam (2010).
- Syahadat Cinta Rabiah Al-Adawiyah (2011)
- Islam Tanpa Diskriminasi, Menegakkan Islam yang Rahmatan Lil Alamin (2013)

== Gallery ==
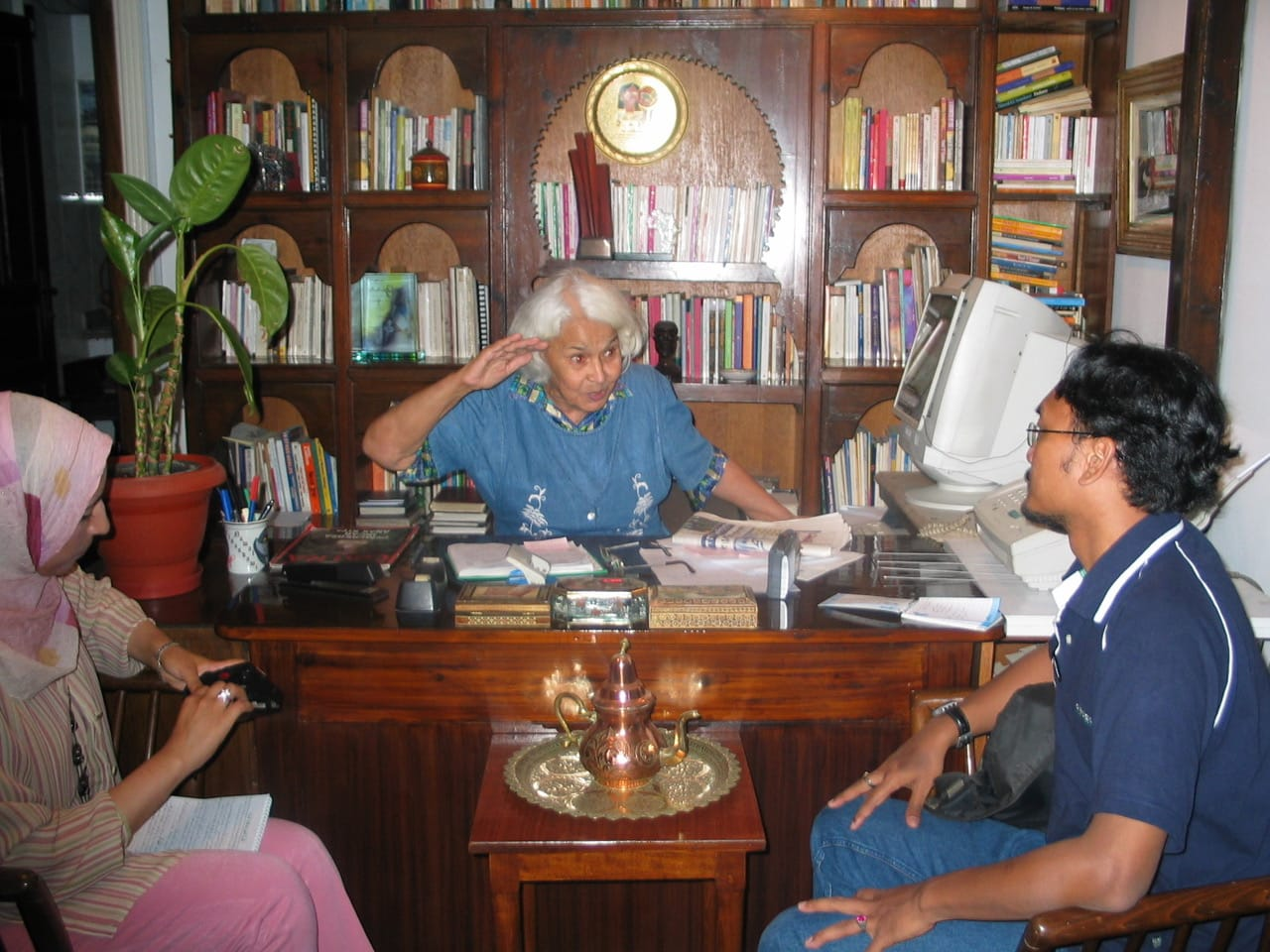
Interview with Nawal Saadawi as a Gatra journalist

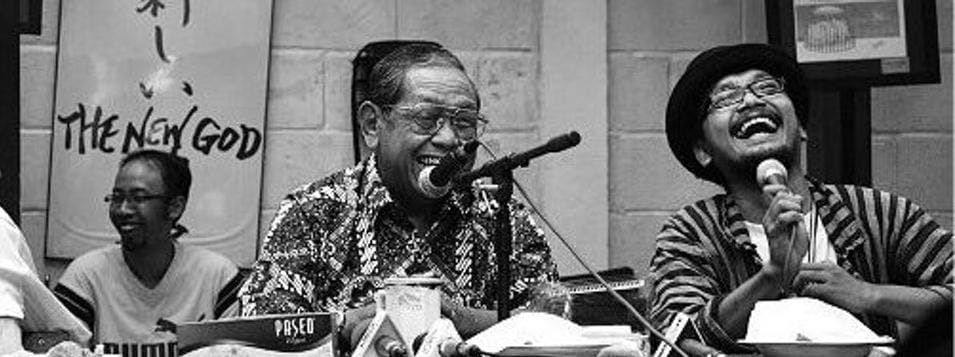
Together with President Gus Dur in a Kongkow Discussion event

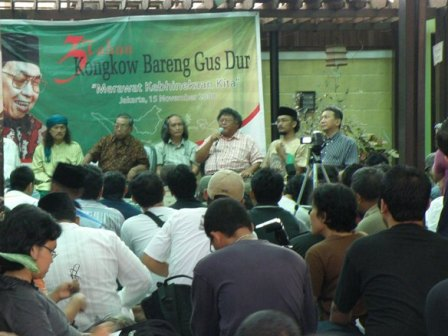
Guntur speaking in the "Kongkow Bareng Gus Dur" event
