= Anggara Wicitra Sastroamidjojo =

Indonesian politician

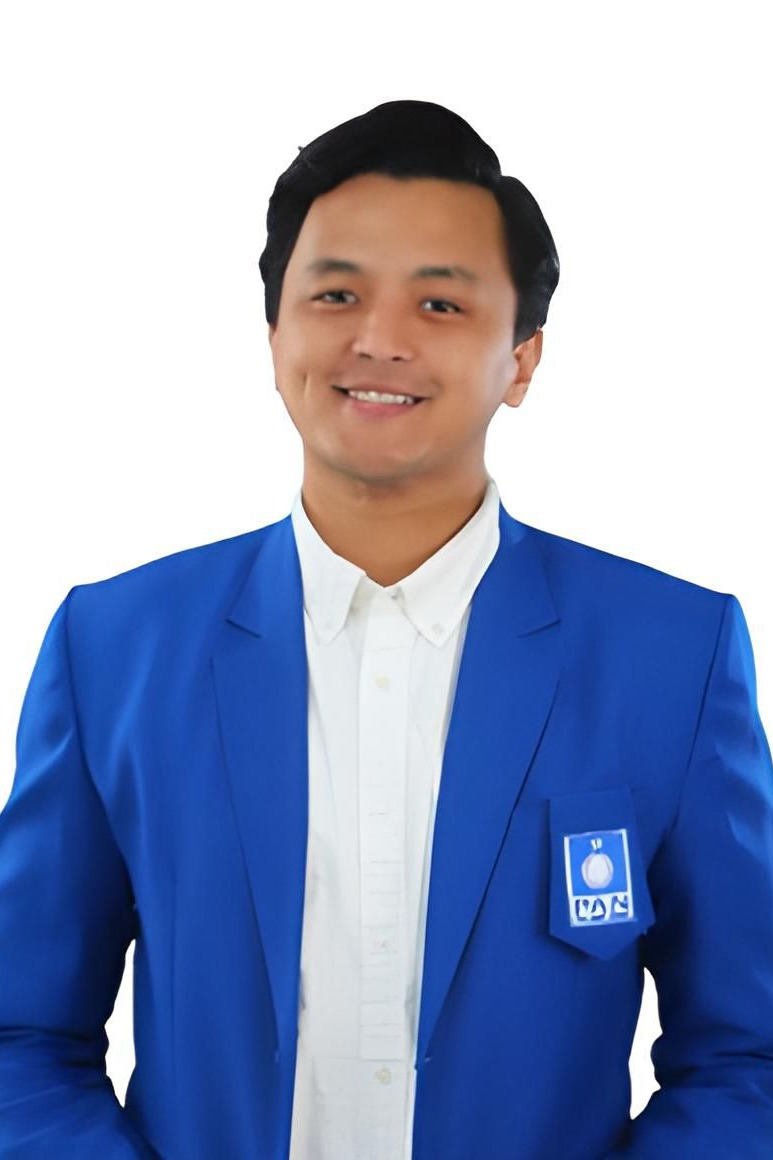

Member of Jakarta DPRD
- In office 1 October 2019 – September 2023

Personal details
- Born: 16 May 1989 (age 35); Jakarta, Indonesia
- Political party: National Mandate Party; PSI (until 2023)

Anggara Wicita Sastroamidjojo (born 16 May 1989) is an Indonesian politician of the National Mandate Party. He was previously a member of the Jakarta Regional People's Representative Council from the Indonesian Solidarity Party. He was elected into the council in 2019.

== Biography ==
Anggara was born on 16 May 1989 in Jakarta. He graduated from SMA Negeri 6 Jakarta in 2007, and proceeded to study advertising. Prior to his political career, he had worked as a project manager, a site surveyor, and a creative director.

In politics, Anggara joined the Indonesian Solidarity Party (PSI) and became chairman of the party's branch in South Jakarta. He was elected into the Jakarta Regional People's Representative Council following the 2019 election as one of eight PSI legislators. He had run in Jakarta's 7th electoral district, and had won 9,027 votes. Within the council, he was appointed as deputy chair of Commission E which covers welfare.

He was appointed leader of PSI's faction in the legislature in April 2022. He has criticized PSI's central committee for the party's attacks against governor Anies Baswedan, which he deemed as too "personal". He has also questioned the financial reasoning behind Jakarta's hosting of Formula E, citing the large commitment fee (Rp 560 billion) compared to the posted operating profit from the event (Rp 5 billion). In 2023, he proposed increasing the salaries of municipal health workers in Jakarta in order to compete with private hospitals.

In September 2023, Anggara moved to the National Mandate Party (PAN), and was replaced in the legislature as PSI's faction leader by William Aditya Sarana. He ran as a PAN candidate for the Jakarta legislature in the 2024 legislative election.

== Family ==
Anggara's grandfather is Ali Sastroamidjojo, who was a former Prime Minister of Indonesia. He received media attention in April 2022 for bringing his seven-month old child into the legislative chamber.
