= Indonesian Solidarity Party =

Political party in Indonesia

Indonesian Solidarity Party Partai Solidaritas Indonesia
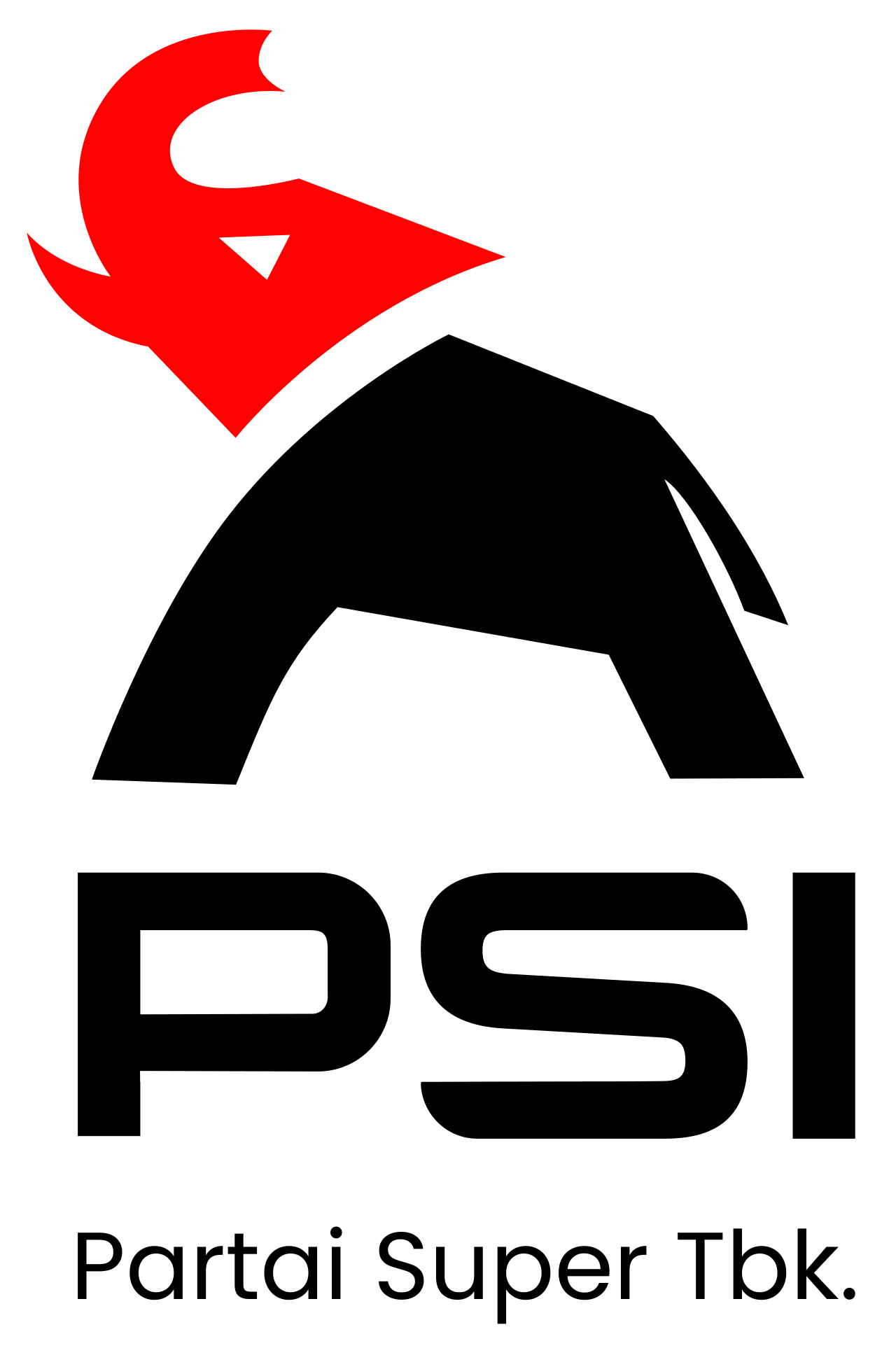
- Abbreviation: PSI
- General Chairman: Kaesang Pangarep
- Secretary-General: I Putu Yoga Saputra (acting)
- Founders: Grace Natalie; Jeffrie Geovanie; Raja Juli Antoni; Isyana Bagoes Oka
- Founded: 16 November 2014; 12 years ago
- Headquarters: Jl. K.H. Wahid Hasyim 194, Kampung Bali, Tanah Abang, Central Jakarta 10250
- Membership (2023): 385,481
- Ideology: Pancasila; Indonesian nationalism Jokowism; Republicanism; Secularism; Social democracy; Pluralism; Liberalism; Women's rights; Minority rights; Before 2024: Progressivism Youth politics
- Political position: Centre to centre-left
- National affiliation: Advanced Indonesia Coalition (2023–present); Onward Indonesia Coalition (2018–2023); Great Indonesia Coalition (2014–2018)
- Slogan: Partai Super Tbk. (Super Open Party.)
- Anthem: Mars PSI (PSI March)
- Ballot number: 15
- DPR seats: 0 / 580
- DPRD I seats: 33 / 2,372
- DPRD II seats: 149 / 17,510

Website
- psi.id

The Indonesian Solidarity Party (Indonesian: Partai Solidaritas Indonesia, PSI) is a political party in Indonesia that focuses on women's rights, pluralism, and Indonesian youth. It is led by Kaesang Pangarep who is the youngest son of former Indonesian President Joko Widodo. He joined the party on 23 September 2023 and became the general chairman on 25 September 2023.

PSI endorsed incumbent President Joko Widodo for the 2019 election. In the 2024 general election, PSI won only about 3% of the national vote and would therefore not be represented in the national parliament.

== Origins ==
The party's inception began with a chat at a café in South Jakarta in late 2014. The meeting was attended by Raja Juli Antoni, a former television presenter, Grace Natalie, and Isyana Bagoes Oka, as well as two other young people who were also present. The meeting was held due to the phenomenon of Joko Widodo's election as president in the 2014 presidential election. During the meeting, the issue of political party reform was discussed, resulting in the desire to establish a new political party. Some of the initiators knew each other and had the same perspective on the current political situation.

The party was established on 16 November 2014 in accordance with Notarial Deed Widyatmoko, S.H. Number 14 of 2014. Later on the same date, the PSI Central Leadership Council (DPP PSI) officially submitted a registration letter as a political party. Subsequently, the Ministry of Law and Human Rights officially requested the DPP PSI to complete the requirements for the formation of a political party in accordance with Law No. 2/2011 on Political Parties.

All PSI officials at all levels of leadership then completed the requirements for the formation of this party to ensure PSI passed the Ministry of Law and Human Rights verification which was expected to take place around mid-2016. In the end, it was officially declared a legal entity after passing the Ministry of Law and Human Rights verification on 7 October 2016. The party is the only new party to pass the legal entity selection after the 2014 presidential election. In February 2018, the General Elections Commission announced that PSI was eligible to contest the 2019 general election with the ballot number of 11.

== History ==
PSI logo (2014–2020)

PSI logo (2020–2025)

=== 2019-2020 elections ===
After being officially declared a political party participating in the 2019 elections, PSI immediately made a breakthrough in the selection of legislative candidates. The selection process of legislative candidates was held transparently, openly, and broadcast live on all PSI's social media. The aim is for the public to know and participate in assessing who the legislative candidates are who will represent their voices in the People's Representative Council (DPR-RI) and the Provincial and Regency/City DPRDs.

As many as 45 percent of PSI's candidates in the 2019 elections were women, the highest among other parties and above the minimum female representation requirement of 30 percent. PSI did not set a specific target for the number of female candidates it had field.

PSI's effort to improve the democratic system is to hold conventions to select candidates for regional heads. In the 2020 Indonesian local elections, PSI held Pilkada conventions for the cities of Surabaya and South Tangerang. The two cities were chosen because PSI has held 1 fraction there. In this open selection, PSI invited independent figures with integrity to join the selection committee. The selection in interview format was broadcast live on social media.

In the 2019 election, the party failed to qualify for the national House of Representatives. It won seats in regional legislatures ("Dewan Perwakilan Rakyat Daerah"/DPRD) such as Jakarta and Bali, in addition to the municipal legislatures of a number of relatively large cities such as Surabaya and Bandung.

=== 2024 elections ===
On 3 October 2022 in an online press conference, PSI Vice Chairperson of the Board of Trustees, Grace Natalie, stated that the Indonesian Solidarity Party officially endorsed and gave support to Central Java Governor Ganjar Pranowo as a presidential candidate and Yenny Wahid as a vice presidential candidate in the 2024 elections. The support was given before Ganjar's own party, the Indonesian Democratic Party of Struggle, announced his candidacy. Grace Natalie stated that Ganjar Pranowo was chosen from among nine candidates. PSI’s previous presidential candidates included Ganjar Pranowo, Mahfud MD, Tito Karnavian, Sri Mulyani, and Erick Thohir. The selection of Ganjar as the presidential candidate was determined through the Rembuk Rakyat screening mechanism which began in February 2022. PSI also stated that they would not support Anies Baswedan in the 2024 presidential election. Grace Natalie said this was because PSI believed that Anies had committed a "great sin" against democracy in Indonesia during the 2017 DKI Jakarta regional election. As a reaction, Ganjar stated that he did not know about PSI’s declaration and has not communicated with them. He says he only learned about their support from the media. PSI organized multiple rallies across Jakarta in support of Ganjar's candidacy, in conjunction with rallies by the People's Conscience Party and the United Development Party. Even to making baliho billboards in support of a Ganjar-Yenny candidacy across metropolitan cities and villages in Indonesia. As claims of putting the banners illegally emerged, PSI stated that it was a part of the Rembuk Rakyat process.

However in August 2023, presidential candidate Prabowo Subianto visited PSI and received praise by Grace Natalie, prompting pro-Ganjar member of PSI and the chairman of Ganjarian Spartan, Mohamad Guntur Romli to resign from the party.

Elements from Berkarya Party led by its former general secretary, Badaruddin Andi Picunang joined the party on 1 March 2023 after the failure of the Berkarya Party to contest in the 2024 Indonesian general election and prolonged internal conflicts inside the party.

In the 2024 legislative elections itself, PSI won 4,260,108 votes or 2.81%, below the parliamentary threshold and hence failing to place its members in the national House of Representatives. Chairman Kaesang Pangarep claimed that the party secured 180 seats in provincial and regency/city legislatures in the election, over double the number of seats won in 2019. Following Prabowo's election as president, PSI secretary-general Raja Juli Antoni was appointed Minister of Forestry in the Red White Cabinet.

=== Post-2024 elections ===
On 19 July 2025, its congress announced that Kaesang Pangarep was reelected as the chairman of PSI after defeating two other competitors, Ronald Aristone Sinaga and Agus Mulyono Herlambang, by 65.28% of votes. The voting process was conducted online between 12 and 18 July. At the same time, PSI also rebranded into Partai Super Tbk ('Super Open Party') to reflect its cadres' common ownership, not by the elite or certain group. Its logo was also changed to feature an elephant, with its head facing to left and coloured red (contrasting with the PDI-P's bull logo). In turn, ditching the Fist and Rose logo. This event was also attended by 7th president of Indonesia, Joko Widodo, of which appreciated the party's idea of e-voting during his speech.

In September 2026, Widodo announced that he had joined PSI in October 2025.

== Party policies and program ==
=== Programs ===
The party held National Coffee Break (KopDarNas) conventions in Jakarta, first started on 12 November 2015 as a way to entice young voters to party conventions with free coffee. President Joko Widodo visited the convention on 31st of January 2023.

At the start of the COVID-19 pandemic in Indonesia, PSI administrators and legislators across Indonesia distributed personal protective equipment (PPE) and masks to health workers.

=== Views ===
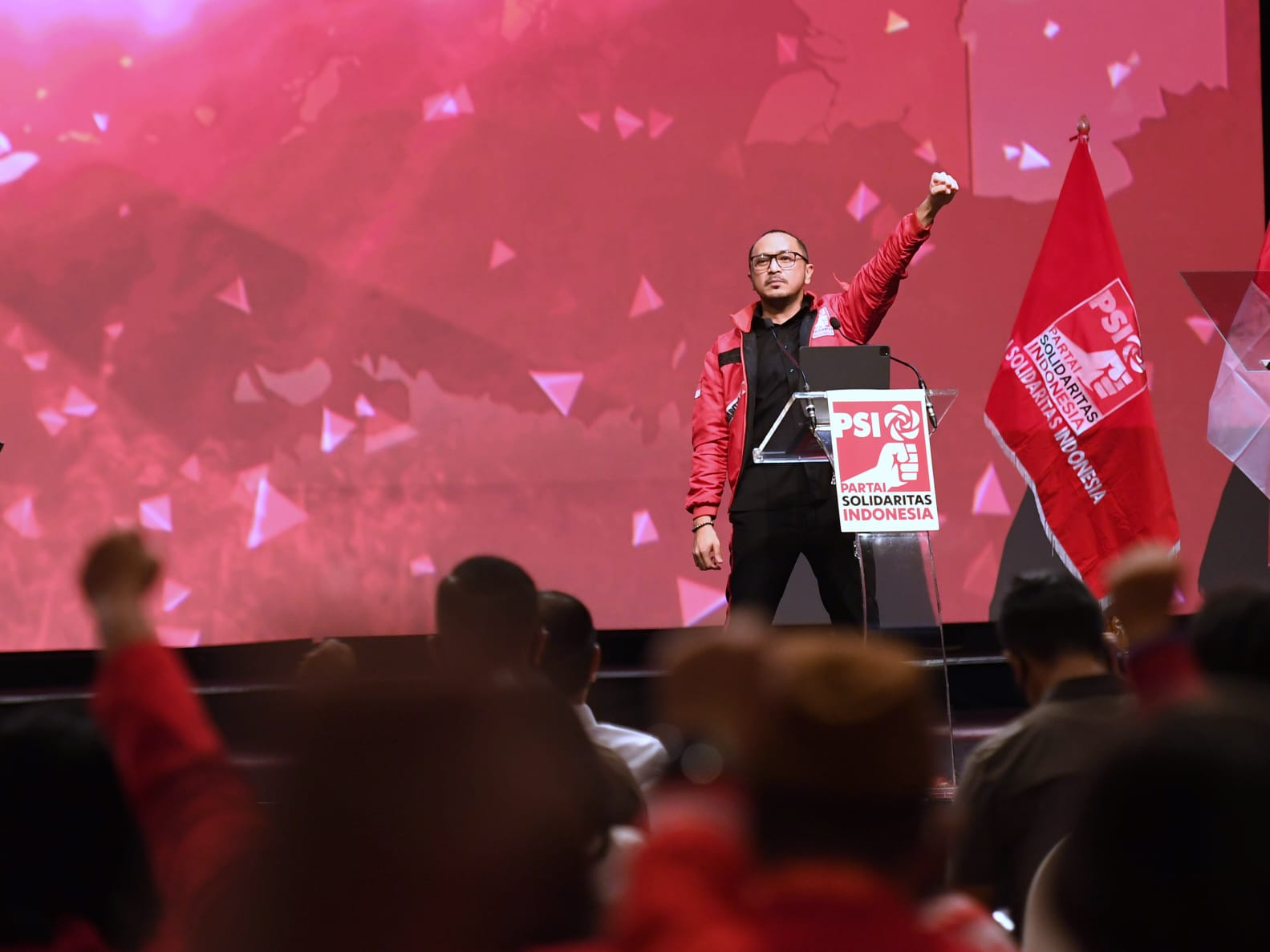
Giring Ganesha raises his fist during a KopDarNas Event.

The PSI claims to be a social democratic party, and has occasionally been described as such. Writing for The Jakarta Post, Yerica Lai has described the party's ideology as "politically liberal but economically conservative". Even though the rose is a symbol of many social democratic parties in Europe and elsewhere, the party claims on its website that its direction or ideology was inspired by the teachings of President Sukarno.

PSI's "trilogy" is named as "spreading virtue", "caring for diversity", and "affirming solidarity." PSI stated that they will fight for a polygamy ban practiced by public officials if elected into the parliament. The PSI Chairperson has also stated that PSI will oppose any religion-based local regulations. The party also famously and frequently criticizes its political opponents, especially Anies Baswedan. Some of the party's members, such as its parliamentary leader in Jakarta Anggara Wicitra Sastroamidjojo, have in turn criticized the party's focus on Baswedan.

In the aftermath of the announcement of the proposed criminal code bill additions and Indonesian Criminal Code Protest, PSI has repeatedly criticized and opposed the RKUHP, saying that it could harm vulnerable groups, minorities, and potentially be used as a tool of identity politics.

== Chairpersons ==
No.	Name	Potrait	Constituency / title	Term of office		Election results
No.	Name	Potrait	Constituency / title	Took office	Left office	Election results
General Chairpersons of the Indonesian Solidarity Party (2014–present)
1	Grace Natalie Louisa (born 1982)		–	16 November 2014	16 November 2021	2014 Unopposed
–	Giring Ganesha (born 1983) Acting		–	18 August 2020	16 November 2021	
2	Giring Ganesha (born 1983)		–	16 November 2021	25 September 2023	2021 Unopposed
3	Kaesang Pangarep (born 1994)		–	25 September 2023	Incumbent	2023 Unopposed 2025 Kaesang Pangarep – 65.28% (102,868); Ronald Sinaga – 22.23% (35,029); Agus Mulyono Herlambang– 12.49% (19,682)

== Election results ==
=== Presidential ===
Election	Ballot number	Candidate	Running mate	1st round (Total votes)	Share of votes	Outcome	2nd round (Total votes)	Share of votes	Outcome
2019	1	Joko Widodo	Ma'ruf Amin	85,607,362	55.50%	Elected			
2024	2	Prabowo Subianto	Gibran Rakabuming	96,214,691	58.59%	Elected			

=== Legislative ===
Election results for national House of Representatives
Election	Ballot number	Leader	Seats		Total votes	Share of votes	Outcome of election
Election	Ballot number	Leader	No.	±	Total votes	Share of votes	Outcome of election
2019	11	Grace Natalie	0 / 575		2,650,361	1.89%	Governing coalition
2024	15	Kaesang Pangarep	0 / 580	0	4,260,108	2.81%	Governing coalition
2024	15	Kaesang Pangarep	0 / 580	0	4,260,108	2.81%	Coalition supply
