= Giring Ganesha =

2nd Chairman of the Indonesian Solidarity Party

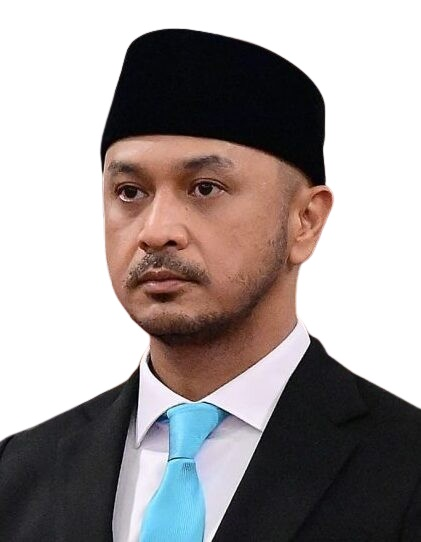
- Official portrait, 2024

Deputy Minister for Cultural Affairs
- Incumbent
- Assumed office 20 October 2024
- President: Prabowo Subianto
- Minister: Fadli Zon
- Preceded by: Wiendu Nuryanti

2nd General Chairman of the Indonesian Solidarity Party
- In office 16 November 2021 – 25 September 2023
- President: Joko Widodo
- Preceded by: Grace Natalie
- Succeeded by: Kaesang Pangarep

Personal details
- Born: Giring Ganesha Djumaryo; 14 July 1983 (age 43) Jakarta, Indonesia
- Party: Independent (since 2026)
- Other political affiliations: PSI (2014-2026)
- Spouse: Cynthia Riza (m. 2010)
- Education: Paramadina University; Open University (S.I.Kom.)
- Occupation: Politician; vocalist; actor
- Musical career
- Genres: Alternative rock; Britpop; Post-Britpop; electronic rock
- Years active: 2002–2017
- Label: Musica Studios
- Formerly of: Nidji

Giring Ganesha Djumaryo (born 14 July 1983) is an Indonesian vocalist and political activist who is currently serving as Deputy Minister for Cultural Affairs. He is a former lead singer of the Indonesian rock band, Nidji. On 31 December 2017, he announced his resignation as Nidji's lead vocalist in order to focus on his political journey. Giring is the former Leader of Indonesian Solidarity Party (PSI). He was previously Acting Leader to cover for Grace Natalie while she pursued her master's degree.

== Biography ==
Giring Ganesha Djumaryo was born in Jakarta on 14 July 1983. He is a Muslim. His father is Djumaryo Imam Muhni. Giring became interested in Britpop when he was in school.

In 2002, he was a founding member of the band Nidji (the name an adaptation of 虹 [niji], the Japanese word for rainbow) together with Muhammad Ramadista Akbar (Rama), Ariel, Muhammad Andro Regantoro (Andro) and Muhammad Adri Prakarsa (Adri). They released their first album, Breakthru', in 2006. Their second album, Top Up, followed in 2007.

In 2008, he and his bandmates wrote "Laskar Pelangi" ("Rainbow Warriors"), the title track for the film Laskar Pelangi, while in Makassar for a concert. He later told Rolling Stone Indonesia that as soon as he had finished reading Andrea Hirata's original book — the source material for the film — he knew he would write the song. Giring went on the hajj with his mother in late 2008/early 2009. That same year, Giring appeared in the music video for Chrisye's posthumous single "Lirih" ("Gentle Voice").

In 2009, Ganesha and Nidji released their third album, Let's Play. The album included a song written for Chintya Riza, at the time Ganesha's girlfriend, entitled "Dosakah Aku" ("Am I Sinning"). In the same year, he provided a voice for the animated film Paddle Pop Kombatei the Movie, a tie-in for the Paddle Pop ice cream marketed in Indonesia by Wall's. In an interview with Tempo magazine, he said he was nervous when providing the dubbing.

He played the role of Sudja, a student of Ahmad Dahlan, in Hanung Bramantyo's biopic Sang Pencerah (The Enlightener) in 2010; it was his first acting role. For the role, he worked out at a gym and ate less to lose 11 kilograms (24 lb); he said it was because there were very few large Indonesians during the Dutch colonisation of Indonesia. Giring also wrote a song for the film, titled "Allah Maha Suci" ("Allah, the All-Pure"), over a period of two days.

On 22 November 2011, Giring, Agnes Monica and Afgan Syahreza sang the song "Kita Bisa" ("We Can") at the closing ceremony of the Southeast Asian Games in Palembang, South Sumatra.

== Legacy ==
Rolling Stone Indonesia ranked "Laskar Pelangi" 134th on its list of the best Indonesian songs of all time. In his review, Hasief Ardiasyah wrote that it was difficult to believe the song had been written without divine intervention.

== Personal life ==
In July 2010, Giring Ganesha married Cynthia Riza, six years his junior, in a Javanese style ceremony. The couple had their first daughter in January 2011. He cites Chris Martin of Coldplay as one of his inspirations and favourite performers.
