= Pramono Anung =

Indonesian politician (born 1963)

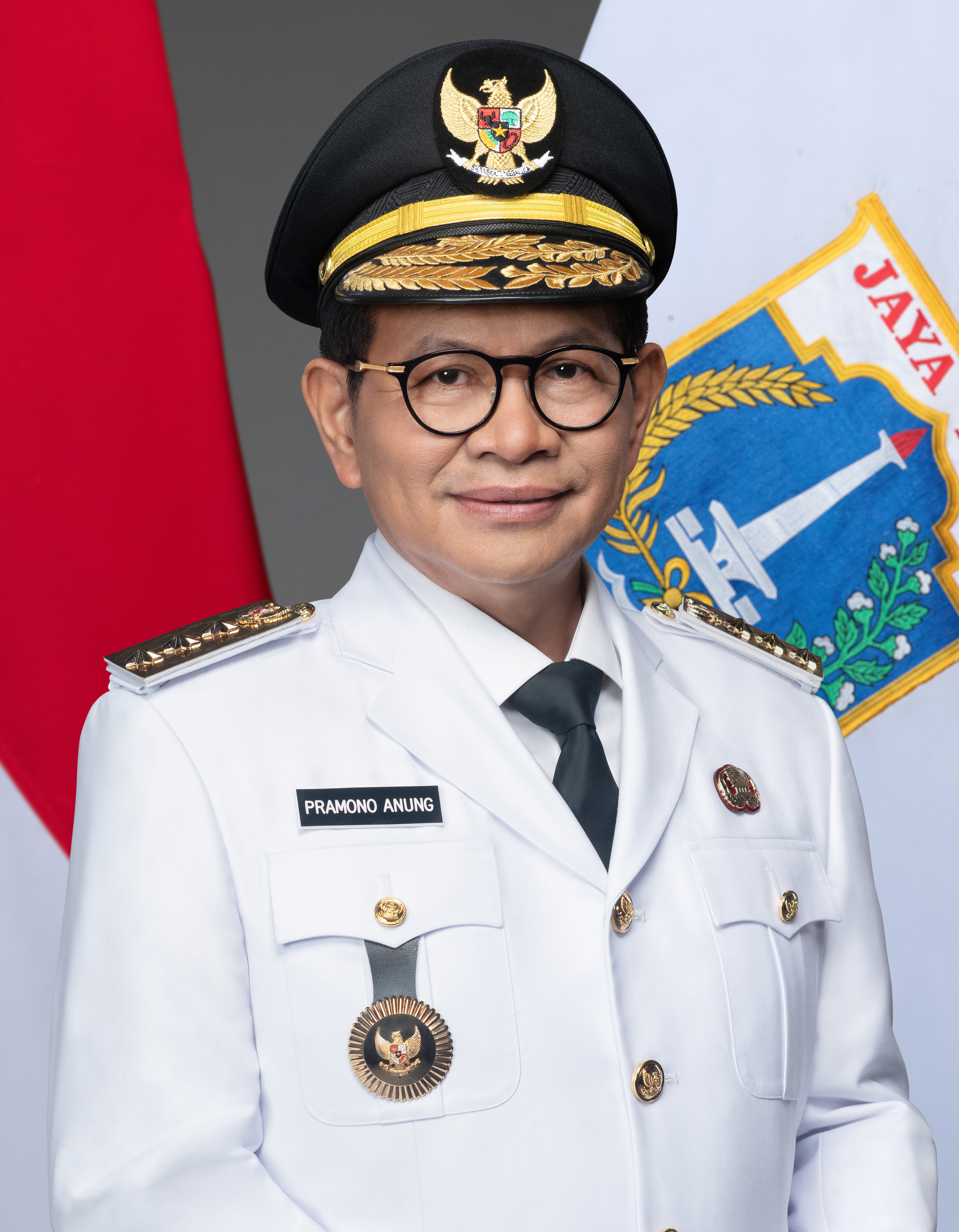
- Official portrait, 2025

15th Governor of Jakarta
- Incumbent
- Assumed office 20 February 2025
- Vice Governor: Rano Karno
- Preceded by: Anies Baswedan; Heru Budi Hartono (acting); Teguh Setyabudi (acting)

17th Cabinet Secretary
- In office 12 August 2015 – 20 September 2024
- President: Joko Widodo
- Preceded by: Andi Widjajanto
- Succeeded by: Pratikno (acting); Teddy Indra Wijaya

Second Deputy Speaker of the House of Representatives
- In office 1 October 2009 – 1 October 2014
- Speaker: Marzuki Alie
- Preceded by: Muhaimin Iskandar
- Succeeded by: Agus Hermanto

Member of the House of Representatives
- In office 1 October 1999 – 12 August 2015
- Succeeded by: Eva Kusuma Sundari
- Constituency: East Java (1999–2004); East Java V (2004–2009); East Java VI (2009–2015)
- Majority: 60,643 (2004); 164,265 (2009); 165,906 (2014)

3rd Secretary-General of the Indonesian Democratic Party of Struggle
- In office 2005 – 8 April 2010
- Chairwoman: Megawati Sukarnoputri
- Preceded by: Soetjipto Soedjono
- Succeeded by: Tjahjo Kumolo

Personal details
- Born: 11 June 1963 (age 63) Kediri, Indonesia
- Party: PDI-P
- Spouse: Endang Nugrahani (m. 1991)
- Children: 2, including Hanindhito Himawan Pramana
- Education: Bandung Institute of Technology; Gadjah Mada University; Padjadjaran University
- Occupation: Politician
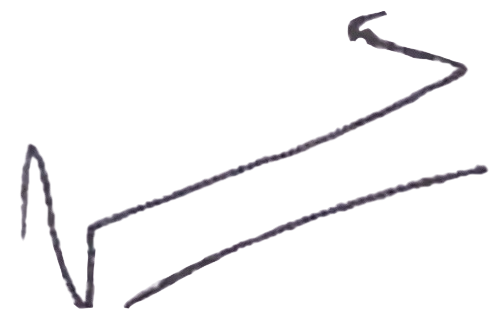
- Signature

Pramono Anung Wibowo (born 11 June 1963), also referred to as Mas Pram, is an Indonesian politician who is serving as the 15th governor of Jakarta since 2025. A member of the Indonesian Democratic Party of Struggle (PDI-P), he previously served as cabinet secretary from 2015 to 2024. He also served in the House of Representatives (DPR) from 2004 to 2015, including as its deputy speaker from 2009 to 2014. He was also secretary-general of PDI-P from 2005 to 2010.

== Early life and education ==
Pramono Anung was born in Kediri to R. Kasbe Prajitna and Sumarni. He is the third of seven children. He completed his elementary education at SD Pawyatan Daha Kediri, continued his junior high school at SMP Pawyatan Daha Kediri, and graduated from SMA Negeri 1 Kediri in 1982.

Then, during his higher education, he pursued his undergraduate education at Mining Engineering at Bandung Institute of Technology and Master of Management at Gadjah Mada University. On 11 January 2013, Pramono officially holds a doctorate degree in Political Communication Science from Padjadjaran University.

He was active in student activities against the government and was Chairman of the Communication Forum of the ITB Student Council Department Association in the 1986-1987 period. He was also the Chairman of the ITB Mining Student Association in the 1985-1986 period.

== Mining career ==
After graduating from university, he filled important positions, such as director at PT Tanito Harum (1988-1996) and PT Vietmindo Energitama (1979-1982), and commissioner at PT Yudhistira Haka Perkasa (1996-1999). He started his political career from the bottom by joining the Indonesian Democratic Party of Struggle (PDIP).

== Political career ==
=== Member of Parliament ===
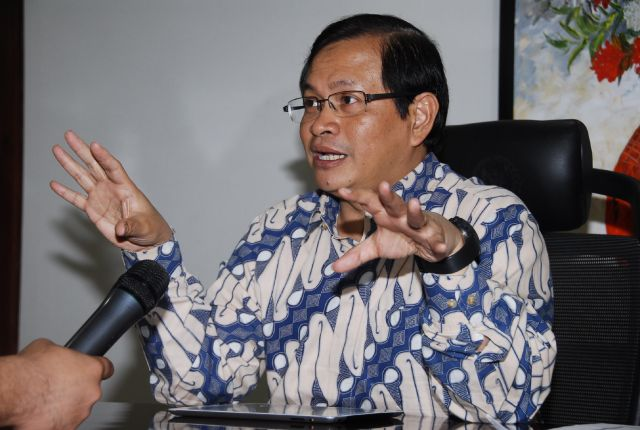
Pramono Anung as Deputy Speaker of the House of Representatives (2009-2014)

As a politician, he has a history of being elected four times as a member of the Indonesian House of Representatives. In 2000 he successfully served as Deputy Secretary General of the PDIP DPP. In 2005, Pramono Anung was promoted to PDIP Secretary General. As Secretary General of PDIP, he was in charge of driving the party's wheels to the regions. He became the driving force to ensure that all party organs worked to win Megawati in the 2009 elections.

During Susilo Bambang Yudhoyono's presidency, he was elected deputy speaker of the House of Representatives for the period 2009‒2014.

=== Cabinet Secretary ===
He was appointed as Cabinet Secretary on 12 August 2015, replacing Andi Widjajanto. During his 9 years of leadership, the Cabinet Secretariat has always received a "qualified without exception" opinion. During his leadership, the tradition of the Cabinet Secretary giving live information via podcast was started. All ministers are also required to attend a cabinet plenary session every month to ensure good coordination. On 2 January 2023, he issued Cabinet Secretary Regulation No 1 Year 2023 which regulates Key Performance Determinations in the Cabinet Secretary Scope.

He also started efforts to prevent the Cabinet Secretariat from becoming a channel for entrusting interests by issuing Cabinet Secretary Regulation No. 6/2017, which contains Guidelines for Handling Conflicts of Interest in 2017.

=== Governor of Jakarta ===
==== Election ====
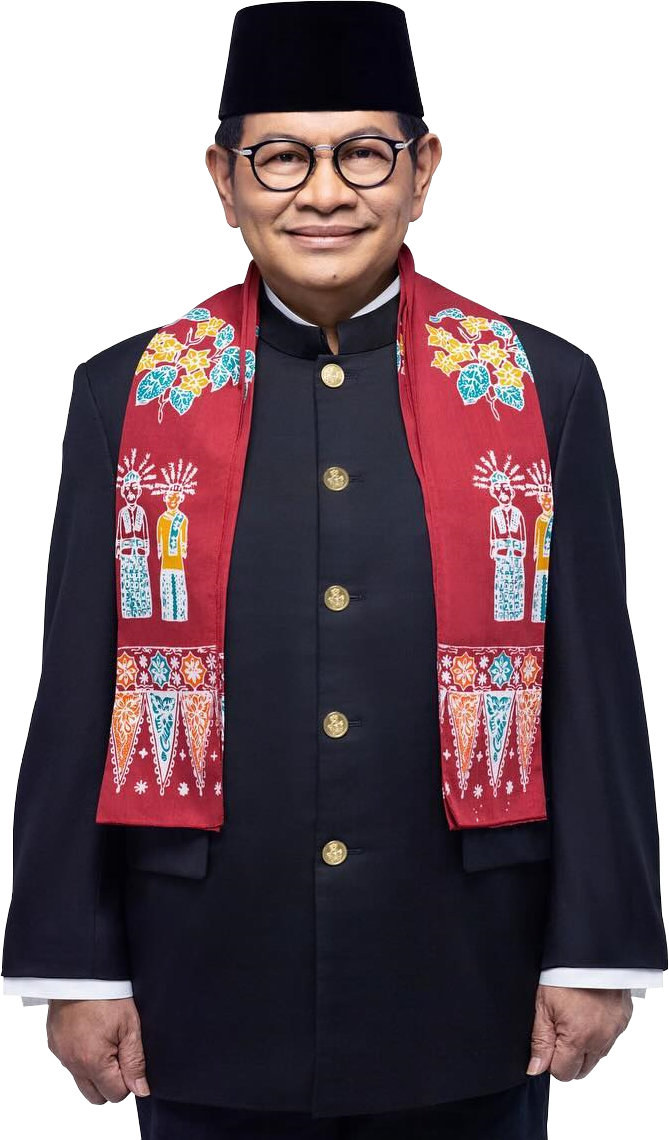
Pramono Anung as candidate of Governor of Jakarta (2024)

On 28 August, Pramono Anung and Rano Karno officially registered to run for governor and vice governor. Before PDI-P announced them as running governor and vice governor, they had several candidates to smoothly run against blank box, such like Anies Baswedan and Basuki Tjahaja Purnama. Initially, Anies Baswedan became PDI-P's presumptive nominee as both Anies and PDI-P traded praises and interests. His candidacy was further strengthened after the Constitutional Court's ruling nullifies the need of a 20% parliament threshold. Rumours of his nomination became stronger as Anies visited the party headquarters and met Rano Karno on August 26, 2024. The meeting then sparked a rumor that both Anies-Rano will be nominated as PDI-P's candidate. Responding to such rumours, 2024 presidential candidate Ganjar Pranowo states that the party is still weighing their options but states his preference in favor of their own party cadres instead while Djarot Saiful Hidayat said that Anies was one of the considered candidates that includes Basuki Tjahaja Purnama, Pramono and Rano Karno.

However, PDI-P eventually did not nominate Anies as their candidate as PDI-P nominated Cabinet Secretary Pramono Anung with Rano Karno acted as vice governor candidate. This decision was officially announced by party treasurer and former Governor of North Sulawesi Olly Dondokambey, states that Pramono-Rano will be nominated as PDI-P's candidate. Despite wearing red clothes that associated with the party and went to visit the party headquarters, Anies Baswedan was not present during the announcement, sparking speculations that PDI-P and Anies had parted ways. Pramono-Rano then registered themselves as candidates for the election on August 28, 2024. On 21 November 2024, Anies officially endorsed Pramono-Rano's candidacy at an event in Blok S Field, Kebayoran Baru, South Jakarta. This endorsement came after earlier speculation about Anies's own potential candidacy with PDI-P's support had not materialized.

Pramono-Rano won 2,183,239 votes (50.07 percent) in the election, defeating former West Java governor Ridwan Kamil and independent candidate Dharma Pongrekun.

==== Tenure ====
As governor, Pramono increased the maximum age of Public Facility Maintenance Agency workers from 55 to 58, along with increasing their contract periods from 1 to 3 years and reducing educational requirements for new recruits. In 2026, he announced that the provincial government aimed to issue Rp 3.5 trillion (~USD 195 million) in municipal bonds in 2027. He managed to gain support from New York mayor Zohran Mamdani who offered Pramono a finance team to help issuing and managing such bonds.

== Personal life ==
Pramono is a fan of New York Knicks. In a small talk with Zohran Mamdani, he said he was a fan since Patrick Ewing's era and admitted that he was very delighted when New York Knicks won the 2026 NBA Finals. He mentioned that Jalen Brunson and Josh Hart are his favorite players and he has been a fan since Patrick Ewing and Carmelo Anthony's era. He is also a fan of Chelsea F.C.

=== Family ===
Pramono is married to Endang Nugrahani and has two children, namely: Hanindhito Himawan Pramana born on 31 July 1992 and Hanifa Fadhila Pramono born on 5 February 1998. His eldest child, Hanindhito Himawan Pramana currently serves as the Regent of Kediri.

== Awards and honours ==
- Indonesia
  - Star of Mahaputera, 2nd Class (Indonesian: Bintang Mahaputera Adipradana) (2014)
  - Star of Bhayangkara, 1st Class (Indonesian: Bintang Bhayangkara Utama) (2017)

== Election history ==
Election	Position	District	Political party	Number of votes	election results
1999 Indonesian legislative election	House of Representatives	East Java	PDI–P	Unknown data	Winning
2004 Indonesian legislative election	House of Representatives	East Java V	PDI–P	60,643	Winning
2009 Indonesian legislative election	House of Representatives	East Java VI	PDI–P	164,265	Winning
2014 Indonesian legislative election	House of Representatives	East Java VI	PDI–P	165,906	Winning

Election	Position	Political party	Number of votes	election results
2024 Jakarta gubernatorial election	Governor of Jakarta	PDI–P	2,183,239	Winning
