= Hinsa Siburian =

Indonesian government official and former military officer

Lieutenant General (Ret.) Hinsa Siburian
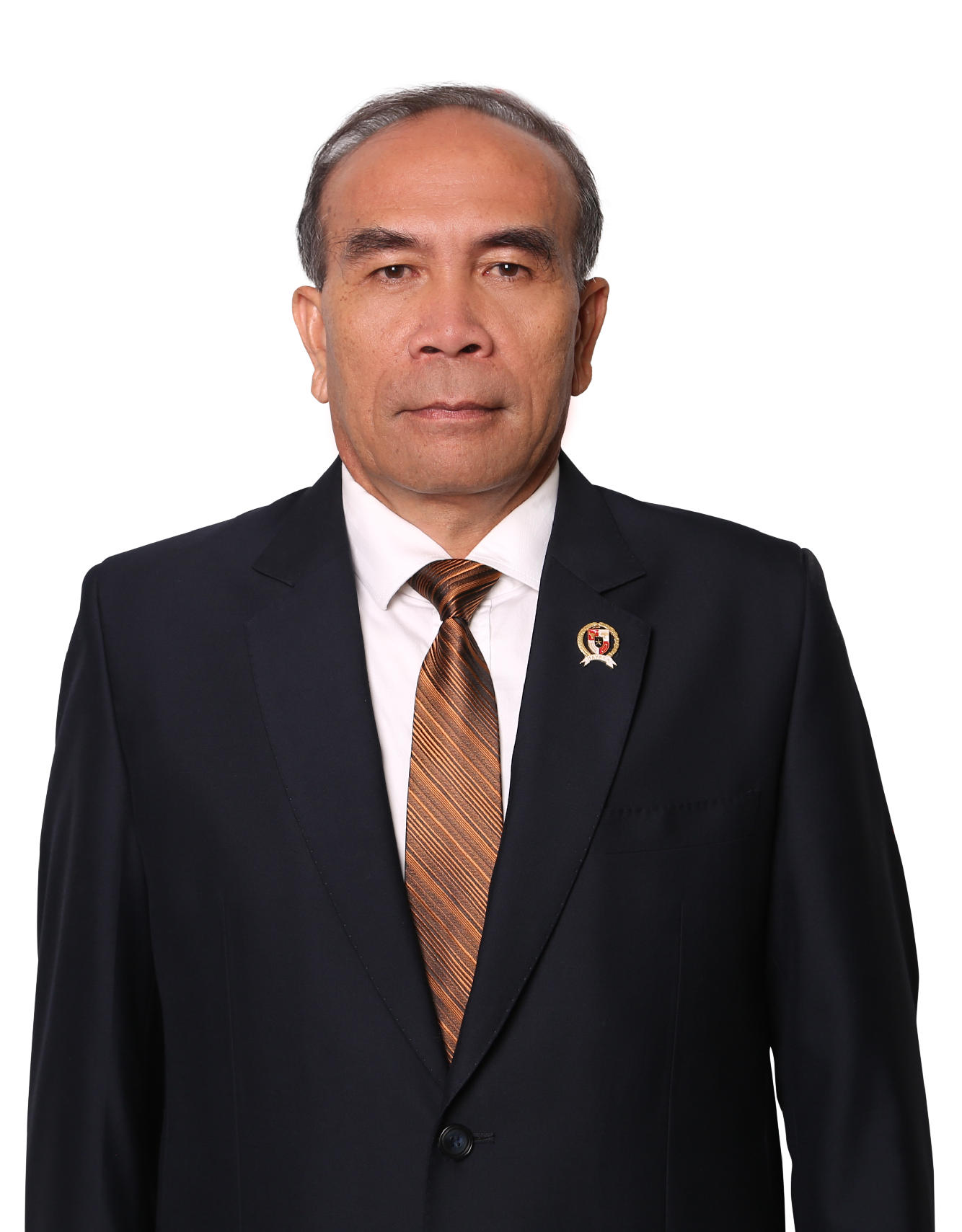

2nd Chief of National Cyber and Crypto Agency
- In office 21 May 2019 – 6 December 2024
- Deputy: Dharma Pongrekun
- Preceded by: Major General (Ret.) Dr. Djoko Setiadi
- Succeeded by: Vacant

Personal details
- Born: 28 October 1959 (age 66) Tarutung, North Sumatra, Indonesia
- Spouse: Lucyanna Endang boru Sianturi
- Education: Indonesian Military Academy (1986)

Military service
- Allegiance: Indonesia
- Branch/service: Indonesian Army
- Years of service: 1986–2017
- Rank: Lieutenant General
- Unit: Infantry (Kopassus)
- Battles/wars: Papua conflict, Indonesian invasion of East Timor

Lieutenant General (Ret.) Hinsa Siburian (born 28 October 1959) is an Indonesian government official and former military officer. He served as Chief of National Cyber and Crypto Agency (Indonesian: Badan Siber dan Sandi Negara, BSSN) beginning on 21 May 2019, replacing Major General (Ret.) Dr. Djoko Setiadi.

== Early life ==
Siburian was born at Tarutung, 28 October 1959. He graduated from Indonesian Military Academy in 1986, and won both Adhi Makayasa and Tri Sakti Wiratama awards. Adhi Makayasa was named best graduate of Indonesian Military Academies system (each branch has their own Adhi Makayasa winner), and Tri Sakti Wiratama awarded him with the highest honor, for excelling in mental, physical, and intellectual aspects.

He was educated in the Indonesian Army Command and General Staff College (graduated in 2000), Indonesian Armed Forces Staff and Command Colleges (graduated in 2006), and National Resilience Institute of The Republic of Indonesia (2011).

== Career ==
Siburian was assigned to Kopassus after graduation. He took various assignments during his time in military, mostly in Kopassus.

- Kopassus (1986–1994)
- Commander of Counter Terrorism Training Center, Sat-81/Counter Terror, Kopassus (1994)
- Task Force Commander of Cendrawasih Task Force, Group 3 Sandhi Yudha Kopassus (2002)
- Operation Assistant of Army Strategic Reserve Command (Kakostrad) (2009)
- Regimental Commander 043/Garuda Hitam, Kodam II/Sriwijaya (2010)
- Middle Commissioned Officer (Indonesian: Perwira Menengah, Pamen) HQ Detachment, TNI AD HQ (2011)
- Training Director Indonesian Army Doctrine, Education and Training Development Command (2012)
- Regimental Commander 173/Praja Vira Braja, Kodam XVII/Cendrawasih (2013)
- Kodam Chief of Staff (Indonesian: Kepala Staf Kodam, Kasdam) Kodam XVII/Cenderawasih (2013)
- Operation Assistant of Army Chief of Staff (2014)
- Commander of Infantry Weaponry Center, Indonesian Army Doctrine, Education and Training Development Command (2014)
- Chief of Kodam XVII/Cenderawasih (2015)
- Vice Chief of Staff Indonesian Army (2017)

During his assignment in Papua as Kasdam of Kodam XVII/Cenderawasih, he was instrumental in reconciling Dani tribe and Moni tribe, two indigenous tribe in Papua, which almost started the Timika tribal war in 2014.

== Post Military Career ==
In December 2018, he was appointed commissary of Freeport Indonesia.

On 21 May 2019, he was appointed by Joko Widodo as Chief of BSSN, where he remained through 2021.

== Chief of BSSN ==
On 21 May 2019, he was appointed Chief of BSSN via Presidential Decree No 56/P/2019. He was appointed as the second chief of BSSN, and the first to enjoy ministerial-level facilities and rights. He swore to fight hoaxes and to strengthen Indonesia cyber intelligence capabilities.

On 6 December 2024, he was stepped down from Chef of BSSN and replaced by Lieutenant General Nugroho Sulistyo Budi. However, before the transfer was finalized, Lieutenant General Budi entered his mandatory retirement age. As a result, the current chief of BSSN is currently vacant.

== Personal life ==
Siburian married Lucyanna Endang boru Sianturi. He was honored by both Siburian and Sianturi Batak clans on 5 August 2017 in a traditional ceremony.
