= Teguh Setyabudi =

Indonesian bureaucrat (born 1967)

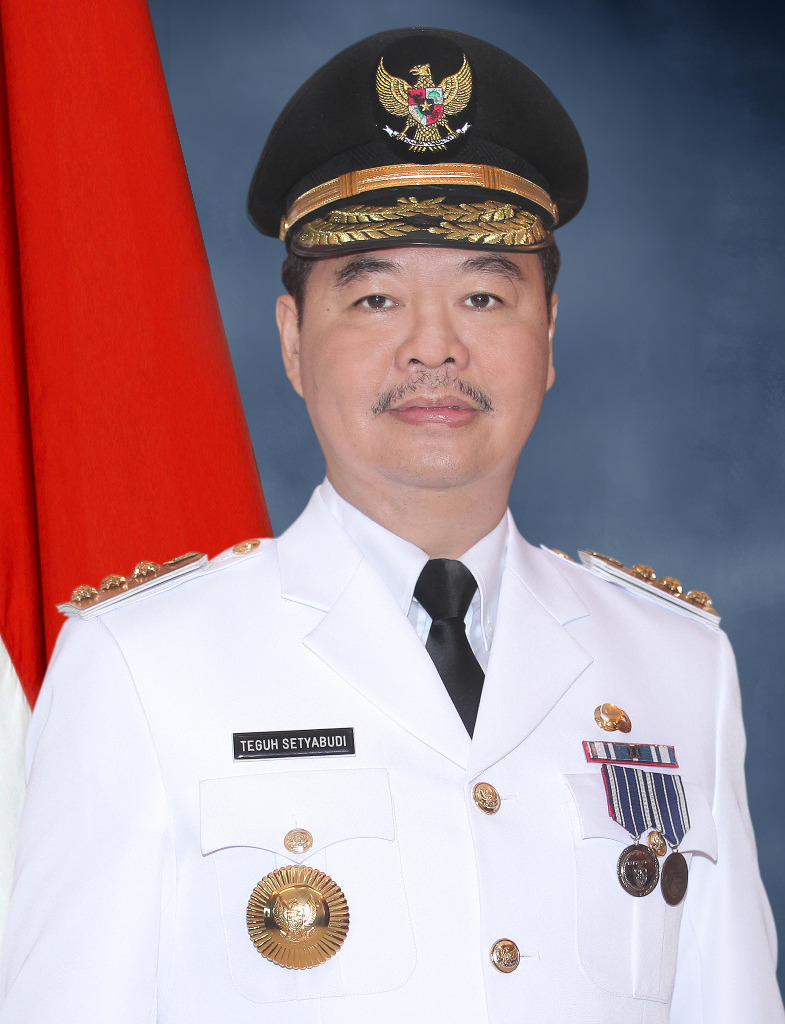
- Official portrait, 2018

Acting Governor of Jakarta
- In office 18 October 2024 – 20 February 2025
- Preceded by: Heru Budi Hartono (acting)
- Succeeded by: Pramono Anung

Acting Governor of North Kalimantan
- In office 26 September 2020 – 5 December 2020
- Preceded by: Irianto Lambrie
- Succeeded by: Irianto Lambrie

Acting Governor of Southeast Sulawesi
- In office 18 February 2018 – 5 September 2018
- Preceded by: Saleh Lasata (acting)
- Succeeded by: Ali Mazi

Personal details
- Born: 8 March 1967 (age 59) Purwokerto, Banyumas, Indonesia
- Party: Independent
- Spouse: Ika Octaviana (m. 1994)
- Education: Gadjah Mada University (Drs.); State University of Jakarta (M.Pd.); Institute of Home Affairs Governance (Dr.)
- Occupation: Bureaucrat

Teguh Setyabudi (born 8 March 1967) is an Indonesian civil servant who was acting Governor of Jakarta in 2024.

Setyabudi was appointed by Home Affairs Minister Tjahjo Kumolo to replace Saleh Lasata on 18 February 2018. Lasata himself had been appointed by Kumolo as acting governor to replace Nur Alam, who'd been removed from office due to a graft investigation by the Corruption Eradication Commission. Lasata praised Setyabudi's inauguration as an honor for the people.

On 15 March 2023 Teguh Setyabudi has also served as the Home Ministry's head of the Agency for Human Resources Development, as well as the head of the Directorate General of Regional Autonomy.

On 18 October 2024 Teguh Setyabudi appointed by Joko Widodo to serve as acting Governor of Jakarta replacing Heru Budi Hartono. This appointment was made to fill the vacant position until the election of the Governor in February 2025.
