= 2024 Jakarta gubernatorial election =

- 27 November 2024
- Turnout: 57.52% (▼19.50pp)
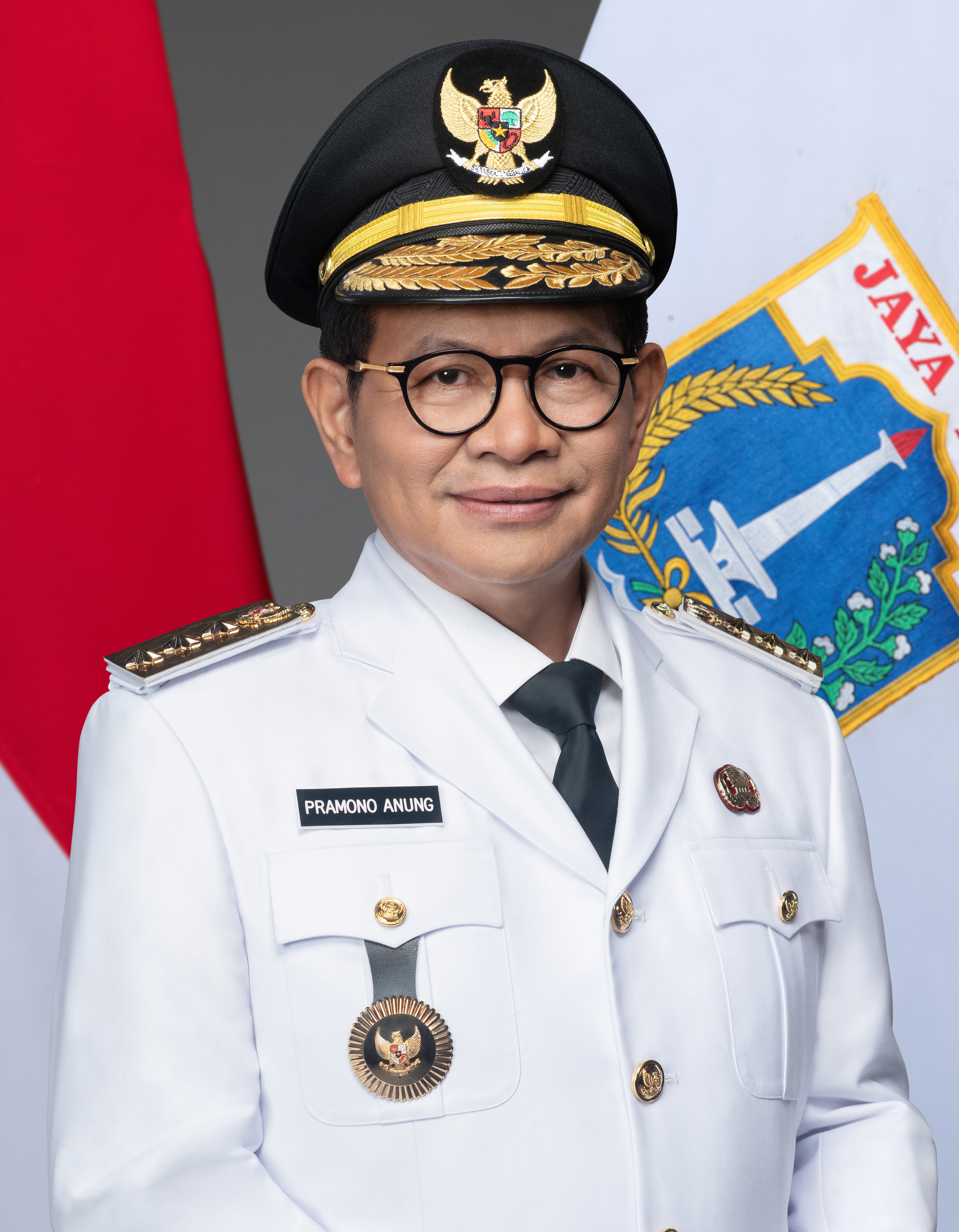

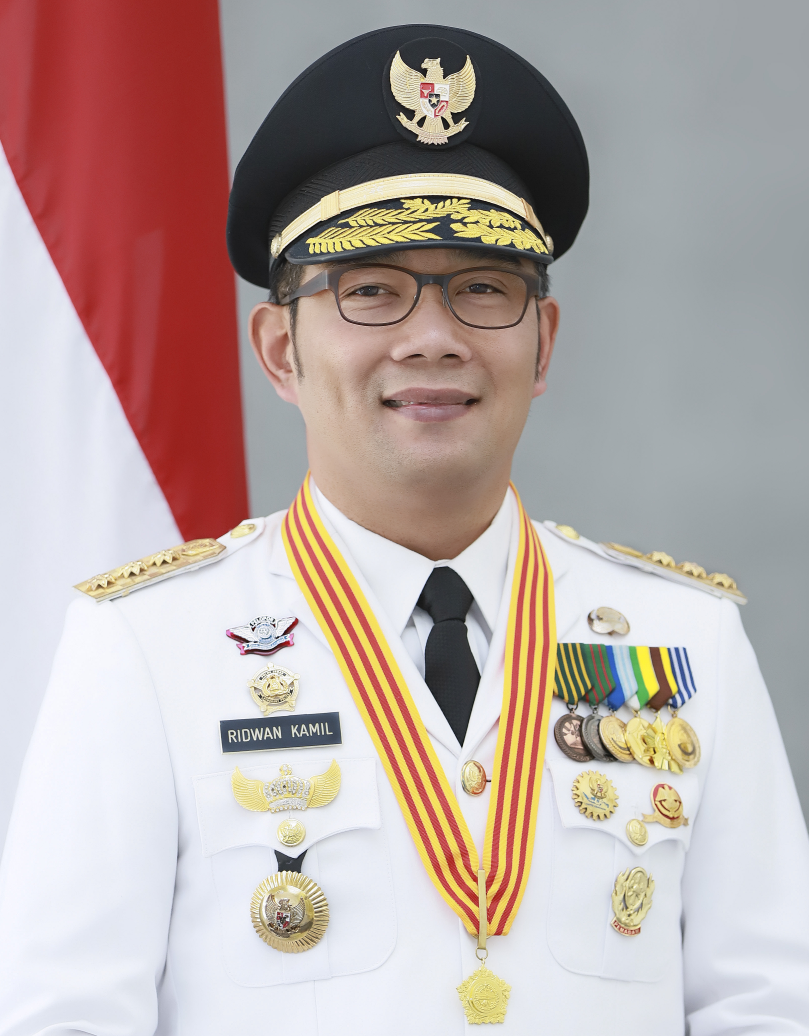

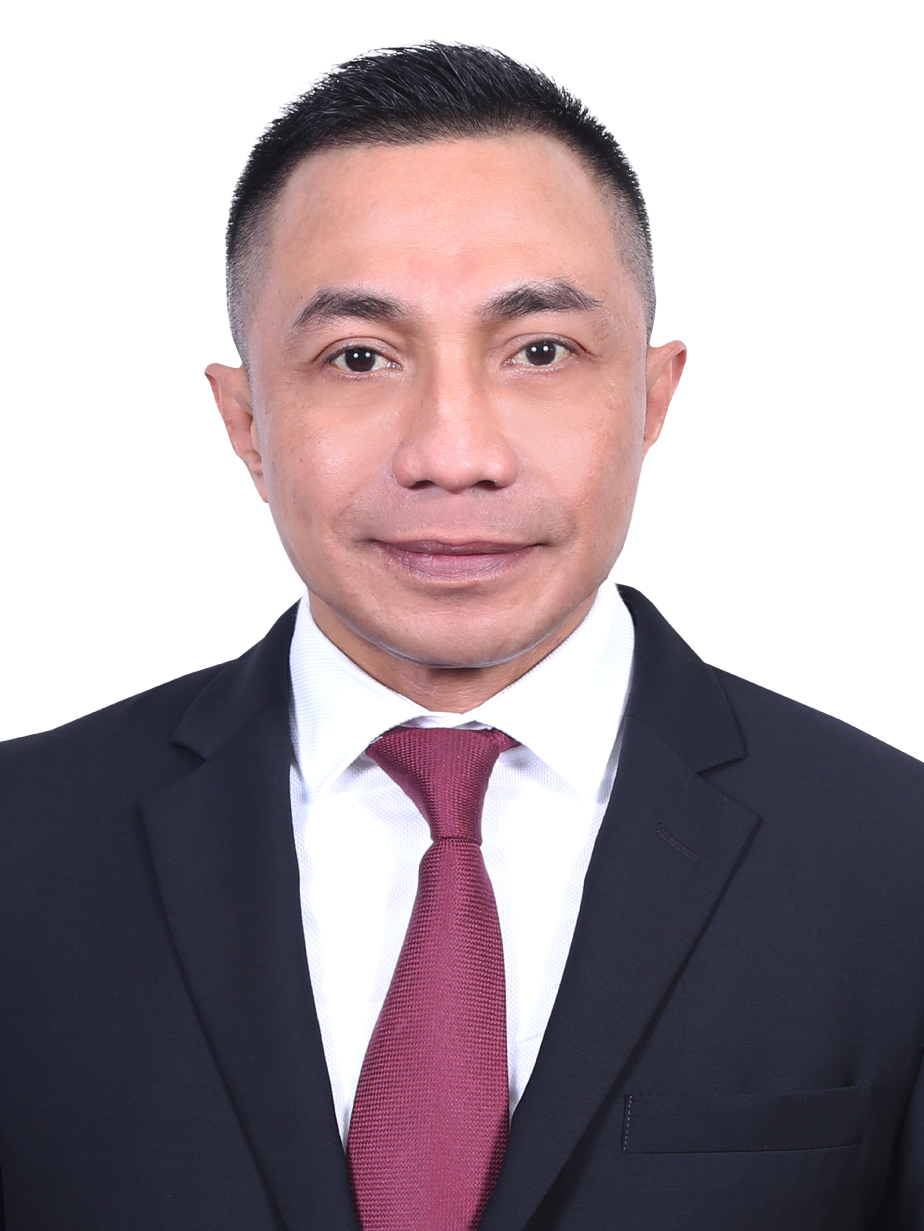
Candidate	Pramono Anung	Ridwan Kamil	Dharma Pongrekun
Party	PDI-P	Golkar	Independent
Alliance	–	KIM Plus	–
Running mate	Rano Karno	Suswono	Kun Wardana Abyoto
Popular vote	2,183,239	1,718,160	459,230
Percentage	50.07%	39.40%	10.53%
- Results by subdistrict ()
Governor before election
Teguh Setyabudi (acting)
Independent
Elected Governor
Pramono Anung
PDI-P

The 2024 Jakarta gubernatorial election was held on 27 November 2024 to elect both the governor and vice governor of Jakarta for the 2025 to 2030 term. The election was held as part of local elections for governors, regents, and mayors across 36 other provinces in Indonesia.

Anies Baswedan, the previous elected governor, was eligible to run for a second term, but his bid failed as supporting parties of his presidential campaign decided to support the Ridwan Kamil-Suswono pair of the Advanced Indonesia Coalition Plus (KIM Plus). As a result, three candidates participated in the elections, KIM Plus candidate Ridwan Kamil-Suswono, independent candidate Dharma Pongrekun-Kun Wardana Abyoto, and PDI-P candidate Pramono Anung-Rano Karno.

The Pramono-Rano pair emerged victorious, winning 50.07% of the votes, therefore avoiding a runoff election. The pair also won all six administrative areas. However, the election had the lowest voter turnout ever since the beginning of direct gubernatorial elections in Jakarta.

== Background ==
The election, originally scheduled for 2022, was postponed for two years following a 2016 ruling by the General Elections Commission that all 2024 regional elections are to be held on the same day. As a result, when the then-elected governor of Jakarta, Anies Baswedan, completed his term on 16 October 2022, Heru Budi Hartono was appointed acting governor. On 18 October 2024, President Joko Widodo appointed Teguh Setyabudi as acting governor of Jakarta, replacing Heru Budi Hartono.

== Electoral system ==
The gubernatorial election for Jakarta, uniquely for Indonesia's local elections, required a runoff should no candidates achieve a simple majority. It is possible for a candidate to run uncontested, in which case the candidate is still required to win a majority of votes "against" an "empty box" option. Should the candidate fail to do so, the election will be repeated on a later date.

== Candidates ==
Under regulations, only political parties having 22 seats or more in the Jakarta Regional House of Representatives (DPRD) can put forward a candidate. Following the 2024 general election, no parties won 22 or more seats in the DPRD, and so coalitions will be required to nominate a candidate. Candidates may alternatively run if they have gathered at least 618,968 copies of identity cards from local residents, which will be verified by the General Elections Commission (KPU).

On 25 June 2024, the Prosperous Justice Party, the largest party in the DPRD following the 2024 election, announced that the party will be endorsing Anies Baswedan (former governor of Jakarta in 2017–2022 and 2024 presidential candidate) with PKS executive and former leader Sohibul Iman as running mate. The issue of Anies candidacy reportedly showed that PKS is open to be partnered with any political parties. On 22 July 2024, the National Democrat Party declared its endorsement for Anies Baswedan for the 2024 Jakarta gubernatorial election.

In August, however, both Nasdem and PKS withdrew their endorsements of Anies.

On 21 August 2024, the Labour Party officially declared its stance of nominating Anies Baswedan as a prospective gubernatorial candidate in the 2024 Jakarta gubernatorial election. The Labor Party supports Anies pairing up with Basuki Tjahaja Purnama or more commonly known as Ahok, Rano Karno, or Hendrar Prihadi.

=== Declared ===
These are candidates who have been found to be eligible to run by gaining enough support from political parties or citizens:

1
Candidate from Golkar and PKS
Ridwan Kamil	Suswono
for Governor	for Vice Governor
Governor of West Java (2018–2023)	Minister of Agriculture of Indonesia (2009–2014)
Parties
91 / 106 (86%) PKS (18 seats); Gerindra (14 seats); NasDem (11 seats); Golkar (10 seats); PKB (10 seats); PAN (10 seats); Demokrat (8 seats); PSI (8 seats); PPP (1 seat); Perindo (1 seat)

After media speculations foreshadowing his candidacy, Ridwan Kamil, known popularly as Kang Emil, declared his candidacy to run for Governor of Jakarta. His candidacy was supported by the Advanced Indonesia Coalition along with other parties such as PKS, PKB, PPP, and NasDem which was dubbed as KIM plus.

Emil's candidacy is viewed as a strategic move due to his high popularity in Bandung as mayor and in West Java as governor. He had successfully held the mayoral office for 2 terms, and was governor for one term. In his campaign, he stressed the need for a healthy competition in a democracy, as he criticize the prospect of an election where only one candidate stands or having to face an empty ballot box.

Emil was endorsed by Golkar, the party he has become a member since 2021, to run for Governor. He gained a wide support within the Advanced Indonesia Coalition and outside of the coalition. Prior to the announcement of his running mate, Emil told the media that his running mate will be endorsed by the Advanced Indonesia Coalition plus members with the initial of 'S', in order to quench speculation. It was later revealed that Ridwan Kamil had chosen former Minister of Agriculture Suswono as his running mate and the pair will be declared on 19 August 2024.

2
Candidate from Independent
Dharma Pongrekun	Kun Wardana Abyoto
for Governor	for Vice Governor
Vice Head of the National Cyber and Crypto Agency (2019–2021)	Lecturer at the National Institute of Science and Technology

Five independent candidates expressed interest in registering. Only one of the five, former three-star police (commissioner) general Dharma Pongrekun, who retired in 2024, submitted the required documents. According to KPU, Pongrekun submitted over 840 thousand declaration of support by the provided deadline. Pongrekun is running with Kun Wardana Abyoto, an academic. Their candidacy is pending their submitted documents being verified until 29 May 2024. In June 2024, KPU announced the discovery of issues within Pongrekun's supporting documents, and suspended his candidacy pending amendments. His candidacy was confirmed by KPU on 15 August 2024.

After KPU's announcement of Pongrekun's candidacy, claims emerged on social media that identity card numbers registered as Pongrekun's supporters - used to fulfill the requirements for declaration of support - had been obtained without consent.

3
Candidate from PDI-P
Pramono Anung	Rano Karno
for Governor	for Vice Governor
Cabinet Secretary of Indonesia (2015–2024)	Governor of Banten (2015–2017)
Parties
15 / 106 (14%) PDI-P (15 seats)

On 28 August, Pramono Anung and Rano Karno officially registered to run for governor and vice governor. Before PDI-P announced them as running governor and vice governor, they had several candidates in mind to smoothly run against Kotak Kosong or empty ballot, such like Anies Baswedan and Basuki Tjahaja Purnama.

Initially, Anies Baswedan was PDI-P's presumptive nominee as both Anies and PDI-P traded praises and interests. His candidacy was further strengthened after the Constitutional Court's ruling nullifies the need of a 20% parliament threshold. Rumours of his nomination became stronger as Anies visited the party headquarters and met Rano Karno on 26 August 2024. The meeting then sparked a rumor that both Anies-Rano will be nominated as PDI-P's candidate. Responding to such rumours, 2024 presidential candidate Ganjar Pranowo states that the party is still weighing their options but states his preference in favor of their own party cadres instead while Djarot Saiful Hidayat said that Anies was one of the considered candidates that includes Basuki Tjahaja Purnama, Pramono Anung, and Rano Karno.

However, PDI-P eventually did not nominate Anies as their candidate as PDI-P nominated Cabinet Secretary Pramono Anung with Rano Karno acted as vice governor candidate. This decision was officially announced by party treasurer and former Governor of North Sulawesi Olly Dondokambey, states that Pramono-Rano will be nominated as PDI-P's candidate. Despite wearing red clothes that associated with the party and went to visit the party headquarters, Anies Baswedan was not present during the announcement, sparking speculations that PDI-P and Anies had parted ways. Pramono-Rano then registered themselves as candidates for the election on 28 August 2024.

Pramono's candidacy gained wide support from preceding Governors of Jakarta such as Fauzi Bowo, Basuki Tjahaja Purnama and Anies Baswedan. He also gained support from Persija Jakarta supporters, the Jakmania (knowing that Ridwan Kamil supported Persib Bandung, Persija's rival).

=== Potential ===
The following are notable individuals who have been mentioned as a potential candidate or expressed interest to run in the 2024 Jakarta gubernatorial election, prior to the opening of registration for the pairs of candidates for Governor and Vice Governor.

- Abdullah Azwar Anas, Minister of State Apparatus Utilization and Bureaucratic Reform
- Agus Harimurti Yudhoyono, Minister of Agrarian Affairs and Spatial Planning
- Ahmad Riza Patria, former Vice Governor of Jakarta
- Ahmad Sahroni, member of House of Representatives
- Ahmad Syaikhu, member of House of Representatives and President of the Prosperous Justice Party
- Airin Rachmi Diany, former mayor of South Tangerang
- Andika Perkasa, former Commander of the Indonesian National Armed Forces
- Anies Baswedan, previous governor and 2024 presidential candidate.
- Basuki Tjahaja Purnama, former Governor of Jakarta
- Djarot Saiful Hidayat, member of the House of Representatives, former Governor of Jakarta.
- Hendrar Prihadi, former mayor of Semarang
- Kaesang Pangarep, chairman of the Indonesian Solidarity Party and son of president Joko Widodo
- Mardani Ali Sera, member of the House of Representatives
- Okky Asokawati, former member of House of Representatives
- Prasetyo Edi Marsudi, Speaker of the Jakarta Regional House of Representatives
- Rahayu Saraswati Djojohadikusumo, member of the House of Representatives and niece of president-elect Prabowo Subianto
- Sandiaga Uno, Minister of Tourism and Creative Economy, former Vice Governor of Jakarta and 2019 presidential election vice-presidential candidate.
- Sudirman Said, former Minister of Energy and Mineral Resources.
- Tri Rismaharini, Minister of Social Affairs
- Zita Anjani, Deputy Speaker of Jakarta Regional House of Representatives and daughter of Minister of Trade Zulkifli Hasan

=== Canceled ===
The following are notable individuals who had declared their candidacy in the election, but canceled their bid:

- Anies Baswedan, Governor of Jakarta (2017–2022) and candidate of 2024 Indonesian presidential election

=== Declined ===
The following are the individuals who have been named as a potential candidate, but publicly declined to run or ran for another elected office:

- Budisatrio Djiwandono, member of the House of Representatives and nephew of president-elect Prabowo Subianto
- Gibran Rakabuming Raka, Mayor of Surakarta (2021–2024) and son of president Joko Widodo (ran for Vice President)

== Endorsements ==
Ridwan Kamil - Suswono

Executive Branch

- Prabowo Subianto, 8th President of Indonesia
- Joko Widodo, 7th President of Indonesia (2014-2024)
- Susilo Bambang Yudhoyono, 6th President of Indonesia (2004-2014)
- Gibran Rakabuming Raka, 14th Vice President of Indonesia
- Zulkifli Hasan, Coordinating Minister for Food Affairs
- Maruarar Sirait, Minister of Housing and Residential Area
- Sandiaga Uno, former Minister of Tourism and Creative Economy

Other Officials

- Agung Laksono, former member of the Presidential Advisory Council
- Mochamad Iriawan, former Secretary of Lemhamnas
- Tantowi Yahya, former Indonesian Ambassador to New Zealand

Member of Parliament

- Sufmi Dasco Ahmad, Deputy Speaker of DPR-RI
- Hidayat Nur Wahid, Deputy Speaker of DPR-RI
- Ahmad Dhani, Member of DPR-RI
- Dave Laksono, Member of DPR-RI
- Dede Yusuf, Member of DPR-RI
- Eko Patrio, Member of DPR-RI
- Habiburokhman, Member of DPR-RI
- Himmatul Aliyah, Member of DPR-RI
- Mardani Ali Sera, Member of DPR-RI
- Rahayu Saraswati Djojohadikusumo, Member of DPR-RI
- Verrell Bramasta, Member of DPR-RI
- Effendi Simbolon, former Member of DPR-RI

Provincial Officials

- Irwan Prayitno, former Governor of West Sumatra
- Ahmad Riza Patria, previous Vice Governor of Jakarta
- Khoirudin, Speaker of Jakarta Regional House of Representatives
- Ahmed Zaki Iskandar, former Regent of Tangerang

Religious Figures

- Rizieq Shihab, former Grand Imam of FPI

Other

- Angkie Yudistia, storyteller
- Astrid Khairunisha, model
- Cheryl Tanzil, politician and former journalist
- Erwin Aksa, politician and businessman
- Ferry Ardiansyah, actor
- Grace Natalie, politician and former journalist
- Jaja Miharja, actor and comedian
- Narji, actor and presenter
- Opie Kumis, actor and comedian
- Raffi Ahmad, actor
- Rhoma Irama, musician
- Said Bajuri, actor
Dharma Pongrekun-Kun Wardana Abyoto

Executive Branch

- Siti Fadilah Supari, former Health Minister of Indonesia

Others

- Kamaruddin Simanjuntak, lawyer
- Rocky Gerung, academic
Pramono Anung - Rano Karno

Executive Branch

- Megawati Soekarnoputri, 5th President of Indonesia (2001-2004)
- Luhut Binsar Pandjaitan, Special Advisor of the President for Digitalization and Government Technology Affairs

Member of Parliament

- Amien Rais, former Speaker of MPR-RI
- Charles Honoris, member of DPR-RI
- Darmadi Durianto, member of DPR-RI
- Denny Cagur, comedian and member of DPR-RI
- Once Mekel, singer and member of DPR-RI
- Putra Nababan, member of DPR-RI
- Rieke Dyah Pitaloka, actress and member of DPR-RI

Provincial Officials

- Anies Baswedan, previous Governor of Jakarta and 2024 presidential candidate
- Fauzi Bowo, former Governor of Jakarta
- Basuki Tjahaja Purnama, former Governor of Jakarta
- Djarot Saiful Hidayat, former Governor of Jakarta
- Sutiyoso, former Governor of Jakarta
- Ganjar Pranowo, former Governor of Central Java and 2024 presidential candidate
- Prasetyo Edi Marsudi, former Speaker of Jakarta Regional House of Representatives
- Tina Toon, singer member of Jakarta Regional House of Representatives

Other

- Ardhito Pramono, singer
- Cak Lontong, comedian
- Chicha Koeswoyo, singer
- Cornelia Agatha, actress
- Mandra, actor
- Suti Karno, actress

Organizations

- Jakmania

== Campaign ==
Ridwan Kamil (RK) campaigned on a direct cash disbursement program to individual communities (Rukun warga) in Jakarta, the expansion of community and cultural events such as festivals and car free days, programs to support senior citizens, and provision of mobile psychological counsellors. Kamil also campaigned on internship and housing suitable for the Generation Z, in addition to unemployment benefits for three months for those whose work was terminated, while touting his closeness with the then president-elect Prabowo Subianto in realizing his programs. On the campaign trail, he decided to sell his paintings in order to add on his campaign funds.

Pramono Anung promised to revitalize the city's community halls to be leasable by local residents for public activities, alongside expansion of the city's public transportation, biking, and CCTV infrastructures. He pursued "happy-go-lucky politics" (politik riang gembira) during the campaign trail and didn't want to disrupt his opponents; he used such strategy to reduce "divisions that occur in community groups".

Three rounds of candidate debates were scheduled by KPU, held on 6 and 27 October, and the final debate on 17 November.

== Political map ==
Following the 2024 Indonesian general election, 11 political parties are represented in the Jakarta Regional House of Representatives:

Political parties	Amount		
Political parties	Seat(s)	%	▲ ▼ (2019)
Prosperous Justice Party (PKS)	18 / 106	17.0%	▲2
Indonesian Democratic Party of Struggle (PDI-P)	15 / 106	14.2%	▼10
Great Indonesia Movement Party (Gerindra)	14 / 106	13.2%	▼5
NasDem Party (NasDem)	11 / 106	10.4%	▲4
Party of Functional Groups (Golkar)	10 / 106	9.4%	▲4
National Awakening Party (PKB)	10 / 106	9.4%	▲5
National Mandate Party (PAN)	10 / 106	9.4%	▲1
Democratic Party (Demokrat)	8 / 106	7.5%	▼2
Indonesian Solidarity Party (PSI)	8 / 106	7.5%	0
United Development Party (PPP)	1 / 106	0.9%	0
Perindo Party (Perindo)	1 / 106	0.9%	New

== Opinion polls ==
=== Pre-election polls ===
Poll source	Date	Sample size						Others	Lead	Error margin
Poll source	Date	Sample size	Anies	Risma	AHY	RK	Ahok	Others	Lead	Error margin
Litbang Kompas	15–20 June 2024	400	29.8%	1.0%	-	8.5%	20.0%	40.7%	9.8%	± 4.9%
Arus Survei Indonesia	23–29 April 2024	400	29%	4%	-	30.5%	-	13.8%	0.2%	N/A
Survei Proximity Indonesia	16–25 May 2024	800	18.5%	-	-	12.5%	14%	55%	4.5%	N/A
Lembaga Survei Jakarta	8–15 January 2024	TBA	18.4%	19.2%	-	23.4%	8.7%	30.3%	4.2%	N/A
Populi Center	26 January–1 February 2022	600	47.5%	3.5%	1.7%	-	8.5%	38.8%	0.2%	± 4%
Jakarta Research; Center	7–14 September 2021	800	28.0%	35.5%	5.6%	-	-	22.2%	7.5%	± 3.4%
Jakarta Research; Center	1–10 April 2021	800	32.4%	37.1%	7.8%	-	-	13.6%	4.7%	± 3.4%
Nusantara Strategic; Network	20–27 February 2021	400	31.8%	34.0%	3.3%	-	-	20.3%	2.2%	± 4.9%
Median	31 January–3 February 2021	400	40.5%	16.5%	-	-	8.5%	12.0%	24.0%	± 4.9%
Median	31 January–3 February 2021	400	45.0%	36.0%	-	-	-	19.0%	9.0%	± 4.9%

=== Election polls ===
Pollster	Fieldwork date	Sample size	Margin of error			
Pollster	Fieldwork date	Sample size	Margin of error	Ridwan Golkar	Dharma Independent	Pramono PDI-P
Alvara Research Center	17–21 November 2024	804	± 3.46%	44.5%	1.9%	49.0%
Indikator Politik Indonesia	15–21 November 2024	1,229	± 2.9%	40.5%	4.8%	42.1%
17 November 2024	Third gubernatorial debate					
Indopolling Research and Consulting	8–15 November 2024	880	± 3.3%	38.4%	4.0%	48.4%
PolMark Indonesia	7–15 November 2024	1,200	± 2.9%	34.8%	3.2%	40.3%
Saiful Mujani Research and Consulting	31 October–9 November 2024	1,210	± 2.9%	39.1%	5.1%	46.0%
27 October 2024	Second gubernatorial debate					
Litbang Kompas	20–25 October 2024	1,200	± 2.9%	34.6%	3.3%	38.3%
LSI Denny JA	20–22 October 2024	800	± 3.5%	37.4%	4.0%	37.1%
Lembaga Survei Indonesia	10–17 October 2024	1,200	± 2.9%	37.4%	6.6%	41.6%
Poltracking Indonesia	10–16 October 2024	2,000	± 2.2%	51.6%	3.9%	36.4%
Indonesia Development Monitoring	7–14 October 2024	1,700	± 2.38%	34.4%	6.4%	40.9%
Ethical Politics	1–10 October 2024	1,240	± 2.8%	30.0%	8.5%	45.6%
6 October 2024	First gubernatorial debate					
Panel Survei Indonesia	29 September–7 October 2024	1,800	± 2.31%	30.4%	4.6%	37.1%
Charta Politika	19–24 September 2024	1,200	± 2.83%	48.3%	5.6%	36.5%
Poltracking Indonesia	9–15 September 2024	1,200	± 2.9%	47.5%	5.1%	31.5%
Lembaga Survei Indonesia	6–12 September 2024	1,200	± 2.9%	51.8%	3.9%	28.4%

== Results ==
=== Quick count results ===
Source	Candidate			Sample entry
Source	Ridwan Kamil	Dharma Pongrekun	Pramono Anung	Sample entry
Charta Politika	39.25%	10.60%	50.15%	100.00%
Indikator Politik Indonesia	39.53%	10.61%	49.87%	100.00%
Lembaga Survei Indonesia	39.29%	10.61%	50.10%	100.00%
Litbang Kompas	40.02%	10.49%	49.49%	100.00%
Saiful Mujani Research and Consulting	38.80%	10.17%	51.03%	100.00%
LSI Denny JA	39.37%	10.68%	49.95%	100.00%

=== Official results ===
Candidate	Running mate	Party	Votes	%
Pramono Anung	Rano Karno	Indonesian Democratic Party of Struggle	2,183,239	50.07
Ridwan Kamil	Suswono	Golkar	1,718,160	39.40
Dharma Pongrekun	Kun Wardana Abyoto	Independent	459,230	10.53
Total			4,360,629	100.00
Valid votes			4,360,629	92.30
Invalid/blank votes			363,764	7.70
Total votes			4,724,393	100.00
Registered voters/turnout			8,214,007	57.52
Source: Official results (Archived)

=== Results by city and regency ===
Administrative city and regency							Valid votes	Invalid votes	Total votes	Turnout	Registered voters
Administrative city and regency	Ridwan Kamil Golkar		Dharma Pongrekun Independent		Pramono Anung PDI-P		Valid votes	Invalid votes	Total votes	Turnout	Registered voters
Administrative city and regency	Votes	%	Votes	%	Votes	%	Valid votes	Invalid votes	Total votes	Turnout	Registered voters
Central Jakarta	152,235	36.47%	44,865	10.75%	220,372	52.79%	417,472	38,077	455,549	55.98%	813,721
East Jakarta	535,613	40.96%	136,935	10.47%	635,170	48.57%	1,307,718	118,116	1,425,834	60.04%	2,374,828
North Jakarta	261,463	39.20%	77,026	11.55%	328,486	49.25%	666,975	45,392	712,367	52.93%	1,345,815
South Jakarta	375,391	39.24%	90,294	9.44%	491,017	51.32%	956,702	89,778	1,046,480	59.83%	1,748,961
West Jakarta	386,880	38.80%	109,457	10.98%	500,738	50.22%	997,075	71,927	1,069,002	55.98%	1,909,774
Thousand Islands	6,578	44.79%	653	4.45%	7,456	50.77%	14,687	474	15,161	72.51%	20,908
Total	1,718,160	39.40%	459,230	10.53%	2,183,239	50.07%	4,360,629	363,764	4,724,393	57.52%	8,214,007
Source: Official results (Archived)

== Aftermath ==
Tabulated quick count results pointed a Pramono-Rano victory, but were unsure on whether the election would have a second round. Three quick count sources (Charta Politika, Lembaga Survei Indonesia, and Saiful Mujani Research and Consulting) pointed to a majority, whereas the other three (Indikator Politik Indonesia, Litbang Kompas, and Lingkaran Survei Indonesia (LSI) Denny JA) pointed to a plurality, therefore necessitating a runoff. The Ridwan-Suswono camp was optimistic that the election would go to a second round, backed by their internal quick counts. Ridwan Kamil subsequently called for voters to wait for the results until its certification. Meanwhile, the Pramono-Rano campaign was generally optimistic for a first round victory, and former governor Anies Baswedan rebuked Ridwan-Suswono camp's claims, saying, "This is not a weather forecast, so just look at the data and see the facts."

After the certification of the election results by the Jakarta General Elections Commission (KPU Jakarta) on 8 December 2024, celebrations broke out at the Hotel Indonesia Roundabout, where supporters and the campaign team of the Pramono-Rano pair declared victory, with the treasurer of the campaign team, Charles Honoris, said, "Thank you for the people of Jakarta who have trusted Mas Pram and Bang Doel. After their inauguration, they will be working hard on solving Jakarta's problems." He hoped that the pair's rivals, Ridwan-Suswono and Dharma-Kun, would accept KPU Jakarta's decision. Former governor Basuki Tjahaja Purnama had communicated with the pair about KPU Jakarta's decision and was thankful that the pair won in the first round as expected. Former governor Anies Baswedan, tweeted, "Congratulations for the victory of the people of Jakarta! God willing, Jakarta is lightning up!"

The head of the Pramono-Rano campaign team, Cak Lontong, said that Dharma Pongrekun had congratulated the pair for winning the elections through the campaign team; Dharma himself rejected this, instead it was his spokesperson Ikhsan Tualeka that congratulated them. Subsequently, Dharma hoped that the newly elected governor will make Jakarta's air cleaner and make sure that there will be no more pandemics hitting Jakarta.

The Ridwan-Suswono camp objected the election results, with witnesses from the camp walking out on the day of the certification. They alleged that KPU Jakarta was not professional in the handling of the election, with the distribution of the election invitation cards they considered problematic, and wanted a rerun of the election in areas where they considered the distribution of forms to be problematic. The coordinator of the campaign team, Ramdan Alamsyah, said, "We will submit it to the Constitutional Court for us to seek justice, which is what we really should get." The Constitutional Court allowed for disputes to be filed pertaining to the election results for up to 3 days since the certification. However, no representative of each election camp filed election disputes to the court by the deadline. After the Jakarta Regional People's Representative Council confirmed the Pramono-Rano pair, Suswono, who represented Ridwan Kamil as he was away, said, "Yes, his message earlier was that the aspirations conveyed by the people of Jakarta through RIDO (Ridwan Kamil and Suswono) could be conveyed by the elected governor."

=== Analysis ===
The victory of the Pramono-Rano pair was attributed by the support of former governor Basuki Tjahaja Purnama (Ahok), and later on, the late endorsement of Anies Baswedan, both of which were rivals in the previous elections and had high electability levels based on surveys. Anies' endorsement, termed the "Anies effect", was perhaps important in Pramono's victory, as argued by political analyst Arif Nurul Imam, who said, "The endorsement factor from figures who support Pram and Rano Karno, including the Anies Baswedan factor. We know that Anies Baswedan's endorsement certainly has an impact on the electoral map in Jakarta. Given that Anies Baswedan is a former Governor of Jakarta, he has a mass base or loyalists in Jakarta." Mardani Ali Sera of the Prosperous Justice Party—Anies' former coalition partner—admitted that the "Anies effect" had a role in influencing the election, while declining findings that Ahok's endorsement increased Pramono's electability.

Survey organization Indonesian Politics Parameter (Parameter Politik Indonesia, PPI) disclosed four factors that led to Pramono-Rano's victory:

1. the Pramono-Rano campaign team had a more aggressive party machine that helped the pair, along with the massive installations of campaign props and social media publications;
2. the consolidation of voters of Anies Baswedan from 2017 and 2024 towards the pair after their meeting around mid-November 2024;
3. Suswono's gaffe on a joke pertaining to a rich widow; and
4. the background of the large coalition backing the Ridwan-Suswono pair which was not considered representative of Jakarta.

Voter turnout was the lowest ever since direct gubernatorial elections were instituted in Jakarta, at 57.52%; this was a large decrease compared to the previous gubernatorial election and general election's turnout at 77.02% and 82.39%, respectively. This reflected voters' disappointment during the candidate registration process, despite the more lenient candidate nomination process. In addition, there was a record percentage of invalid and blank votes at 7.70%, five times of the general election's, attributed to protest votes, particularly on the movement to vote for all three, thus making it invalid.
