= Ali Mazi =

Indonesian lawyer and politician

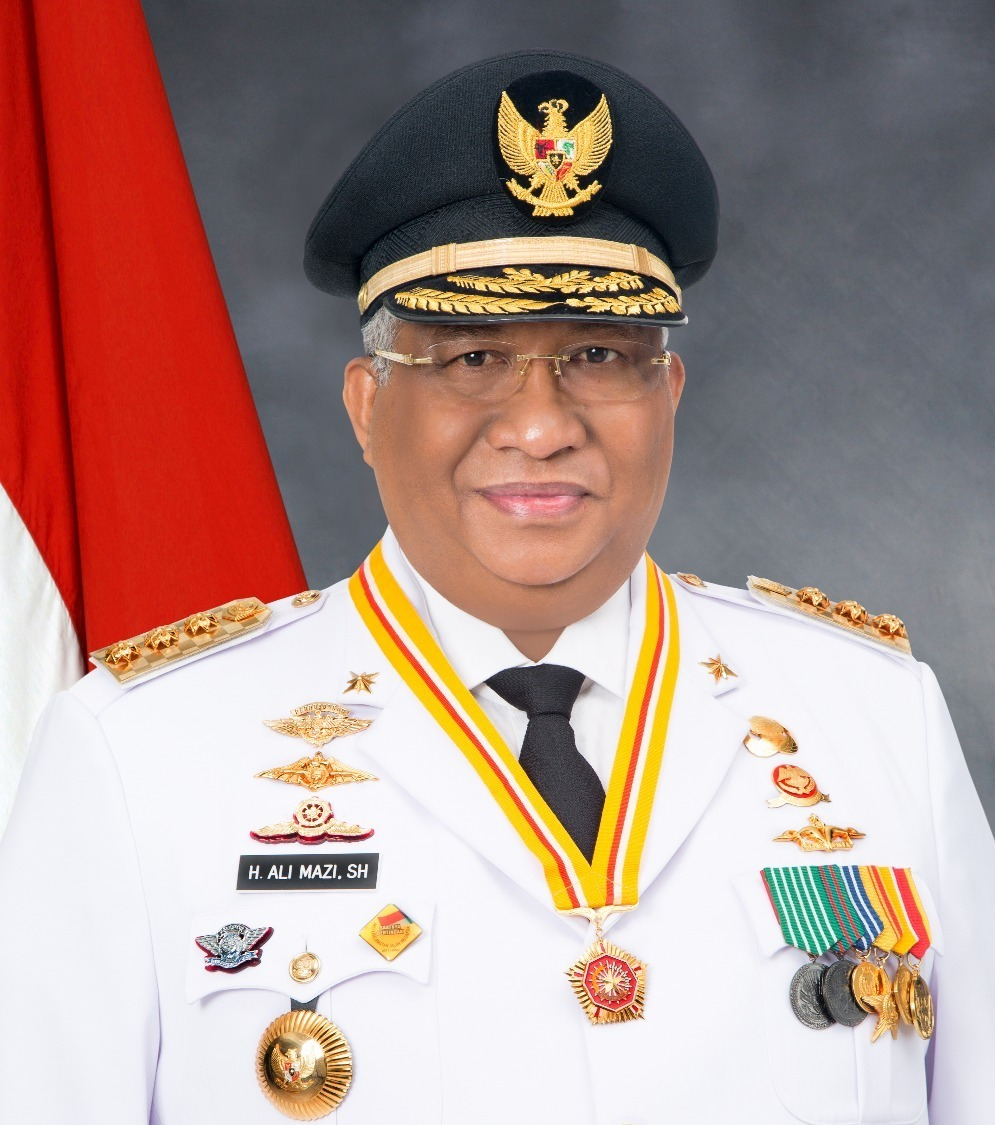

7th Governor of Southeast Sulawesi
- In office 5 September 2018 – 5 September 2023
- Deputy: Lukman Abunawas
- Preceded by: Teguh Setyabudi (acting)
- Succeeded by: Andap Budhi Revianto (acting); Andi Sumangerukka (since 2025)
- In office 16 July 2003 – 18 February 2008
- Deputy: Yusran Silondae
- Preceded by: Laode Kaminuddin
- Succeeded by: Nur Alam

Personal details
- Born: November 25, 1961 (age 64) Buton, Southeast Sulawesi
- Party: Nasdem

Ali Mazi is an Indonesian lawyer and politician who served as the governor of Southeast Sulawesi between 2003–2008 and 2018–2023.

Born in Buton, he previously served as governor between 2003 and 2008 before losing in the 2008 popular election. He was elected for his second term in 2018.

== Background and family ==
Born in Buton on 25 November 1961, completing high school in Baubau. He then went to university at 45 Proclamation University, Yogyakarta. After graduating, he worked as a lawyer, owning his own law firm in addition to serving as commissioner and director in various companies. He is married with five children.

== Career ==
=== First term (2003–2008) ===
He was first elected as governor following a vote by the provincial council, being sworn in on 16 July 2003. His swearing-in was delayed from the planned December 2002 schedule due to allegations of bribery during the voting process.

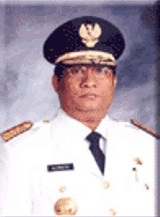
Mazi as Governor for the first term (2003)

In October 2006, he was removed from his post due to him being decided guilty in a corruption case involving building use rights of a Hilton hotel. However, in June 2007, he was released and found not guilty by Central Jakarta's district court. A Supreme Court ruling in October 2008 upheld the decision, citing a lack of proof from the prosecutors.

His first term ended on 18 January 2008, as he lost the 2008 gubernatorial election to Nur Alam. A budget analyst stated that during his first term, nearly Rp 1 trillion of assets disappeared from the local government inventories.

=== Second term ===
Sometime before the 2013 gubernatorial election, he moved from Golkar to the new political party Nasdem, eventually becoming the leader of the provincial office between 2013 and 2016. After failing to run due to a lack of support from political parties in 2013, he ran again in the 2018 election with the support of Golkar and Nasdem and won, securing 43.68 percent of votes in the 3-candidate race.

After the Constitutional Court denied his rivals' disputes regarding the election, he was sworn in on 5 September 2018.
