= 2018 Southeast Sulawesi gubernatorial election =

Local election in Indonesia

- 27 June 2018
- Turnout: 69.5%
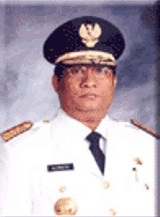

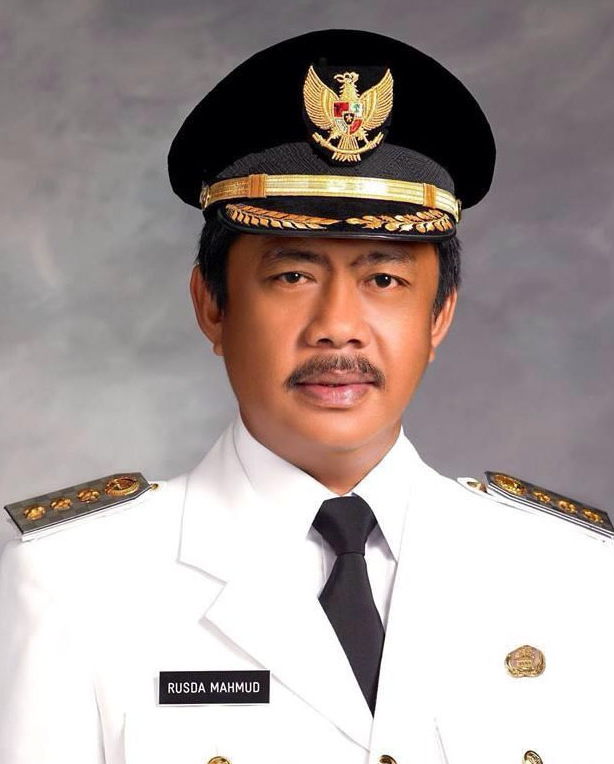

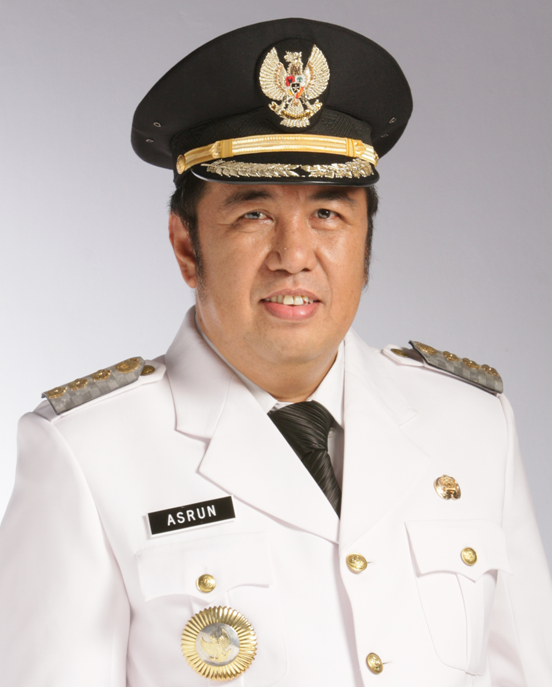
Nominee	Ali Mazi	Rusda Mahmud	Asrun
Party	NasDem	Demokrat	PAN
Running mate	Lukman Abunawas	LM Sjafei Kahar	Hugua
Popular vote	495,880	358,537	280,762
Percentage	43.68	31.58	24.73
- Location of Southeast Sulawesi within Indonesia
Governor before election
Saleh Lasata
PAN
Elected Governor
Ali Mazi
Nasdem

The 2018 Southeast Sulawesi gubernatorial election took place on 27 June 2018 as part of the simultaneous local elections. It was held to elect the governor of Southeast Sulawesi along with their deputy, whilst members of the provincial council (Dewan Perwakilan Rakyat Daerah) will be re-elected in 2019.

Former governor Ali Mazi came out on top of the three-candidate race, defeating former Kendari mayor Asrun and North Kolaka regent Rusda Mahmud.

== Timeline ==
Registration for party-backed candidates were opened between 8 and 10 January 2018, while independent candidates were required to register between 22 and 26 November 2017. The candidates were assigned their ballot numbers on 13 February 2018. The campaigning period would commence between 15 February and 24 June, with a three-day election silence before voting on 27 June. In May 2018, KPU declared that there were 1,628,320 eligible voters for the election.

== Candidates ==
#	Candidate	Positions	Parties
1	Ali Mazi	Governor of Southeast Sulawesi (2003-2008)	Nasdem (3 seats); Golkar (7 seats)
1	Lukman Abunawas	Incumbent provincial secretary	Nasdem (3 seats); Golkar (7 seats)
2	Asrun	Mayor of Kendari (2007-2017)	PAN (9 seats); PDI-P (5 seats); Prosperous Justice Party (5 seats); Hanura (3 seats); Gerindra (4 seats)
2	Hugua	Regent of Wakatobi (2006-2016)	PAN (9 seats); PDI-P (5 seats); Prosperous Justice Party (5 seats); Hanura (3 seats); Gerindra (4 seats)
3	Rusda Mahmud	Regent of North Kolaka (2007-2017)	Demokrat (6 seats); PPP (2 seats); PKB (1 seat)
3	Laode Muhammad Sjafei Kahar	Regent of Buton (2006-2016)	Demokrat (6 seats); PPP (2 seats); PKB (1 seat)

== Results ==
No	Candidate	Votes	%
1	Ali/Lukman	495,880	43.68
2	Asrun/Hugua	280,762	24.73
3	Mahmud/Kahar	358,537	31.58
Total votes		1,135,179	
Invalid votes		22,212	
Turnout		1,157,391	69.51
Source: KPU
