= Suswono =

Indonesian politician (born 1959)

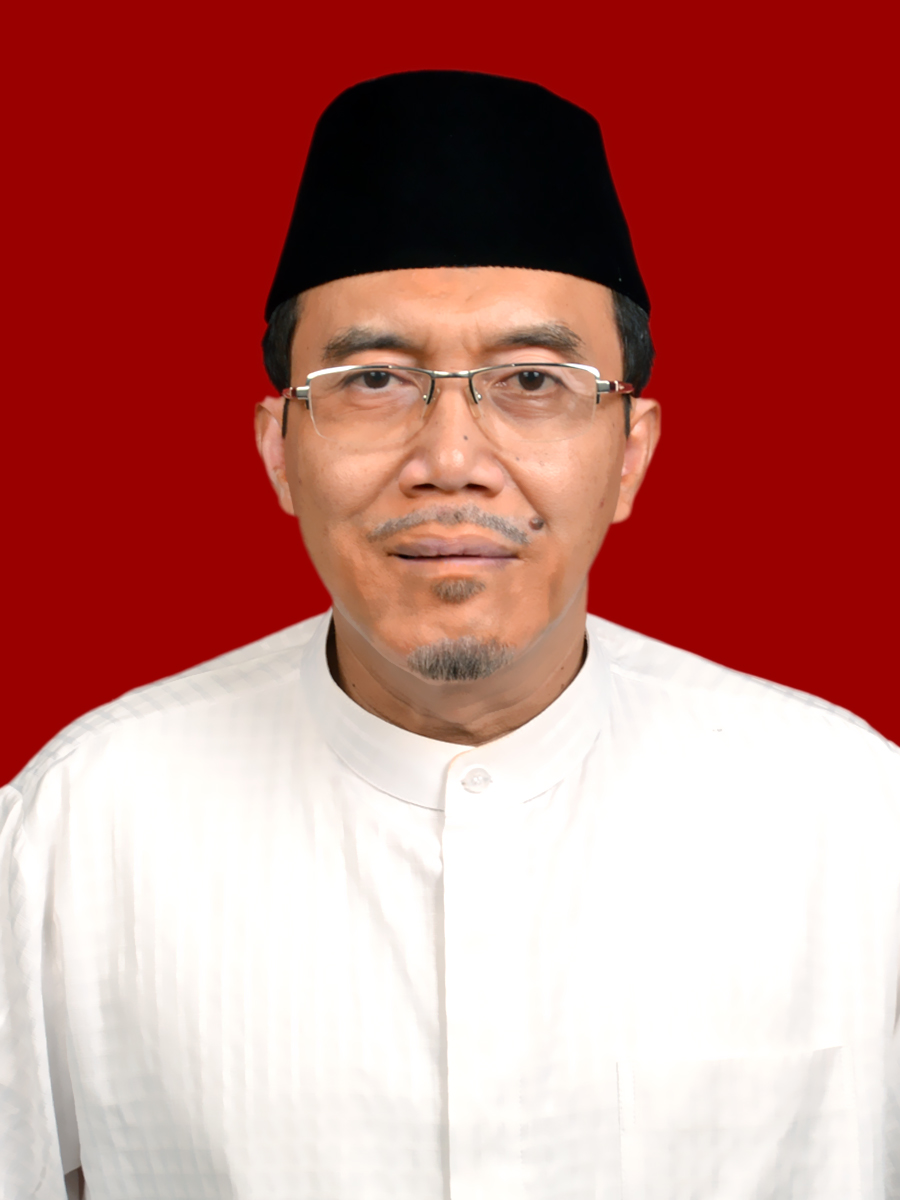

26th Minister of Agriculture
- In office 22 October 2009 – 21 October 2014
- President: Susilo Bambang Yudhoyono
- Preceded by: Anton Apriantono
- Succeeded by: Amran Sulaiman

Personal details
- Born: 20 April 1959 (age 67) Tegal, Indonesia
- Party: Prosperous Justice Party
- Spouse: Mieke Wahyuni
- Children: 4
- Education: Institut Pertanian Bogor
- Occupation: Politician

Suswono (born 20 April 1959) is an Indonesian politician from Tegal, Central Java. He was part of the Second United Indonesia Cabinet and served as Minister of Agriculture since 22 October 2009 until 20 October 2014. He previously served as Vice Chairman of the Commission IV Parliament for the period 2004–2009 for the Prosperous Justice Party. Suswono was a member of the House of Representatives through the local elections in Central Java.

Suswono is running mate for Vice Governor of Jakarta paired with Ridwan Kamil, former Governor of West Java in the 2024 Jakarta gubernatorial election.

== Honours ==
- France:
  - Knight of the Order of Agricultural Merit (2012)
