= Dharma Pongrekun =

Indonesian politician (born 1966)

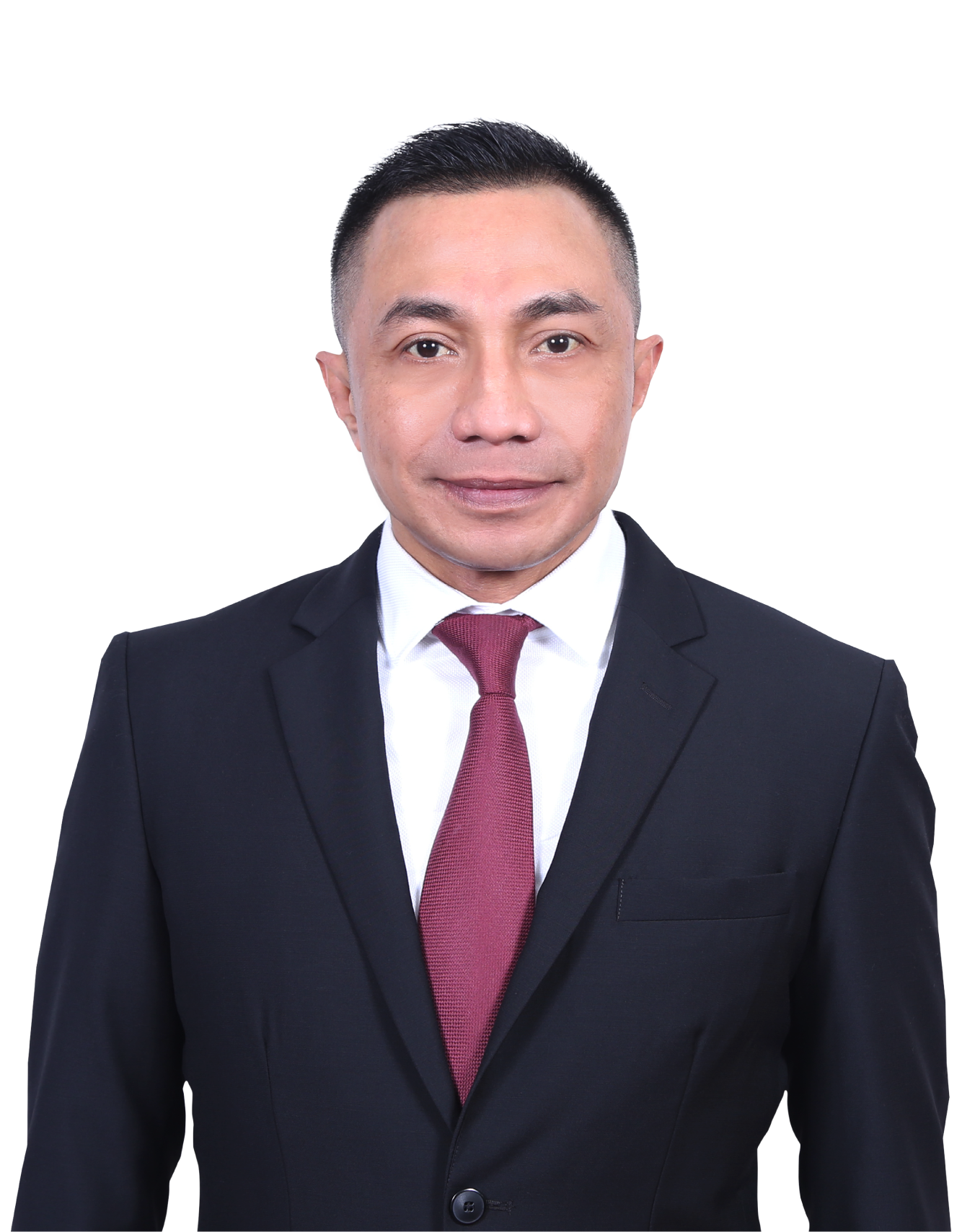
- Official portrait, 2019

Vice Head of the National Cyber and Crypto Agency
- In office 17 July 2019 – 7 October 2021
- Preceded by: Office established
- Succeeded by: Sutanto

Personal details
- Born: 12 January 1966 (age 60) Palu, Indonesia
- Party: Independent
- Education: Indonesian Police Academy; Indonesian Police College; Bhayangkara University Jakarta Raya; Gadjah Mada University
- Profession: Police, analyst, evangelist
- Police career
- Allegiance: Indonesia
- Department: Criminal Investigation Department (Bareskrim)
- Branch: Indonesian National Police
- Service years: 1988–2024
- Rank: Police Commissioner General
- Badge no.: 66010404

Dharma Pongrekun (born 12 January 1966) is an Indonesian former three-star police general, analyst, evangelist, media personality and politician who served as the Vice Head of the National Cyber and Crypto Agency from 17 July 2019 to 7 October 2021 under Hinsa Siburian. Previously, he served two offices in the Criminal Investigation Agency in 2015 and 2016. He retired from the police force in 2024. He ran in the 2024 Jakarta gubernatorial election with Kun Wardana Abyoto, an academic.

== Early life and career ==
Dharma Pongrekun was born in Palu City, Central Sulawesi Province. He attended elementary and middle school before going to Jakarta for high school. He graduated from Indonesian Police Academy, Bandung in 1988. He had a Master of Police Sciences from Indonesian Police College in 1995 and moving on to get a Master of Management at Universitas Bhayangkara Jakarta Raya, a private university affiliated with the National Police, in 2002. He studied again and earning a Master of Law at Gajah Mada University in 2006. In 2023, Pongrekun received an honorary doctorate in humanitarian studies from MBC University, Depok.

His last position in Indonesian National Police was an analyst affiliated with the Police Education and Training Institute (Lembaga Pendidikan dan Pelatihan POLRI, abbreviated as Lemdiklat Polri), Jakarta with the position of Principal Policy Analyst for Assessments and Development. He held the position from 2021 to 2024.

He is also an evangelist at Bethany Indonesian Church Sunter Jakarta, a Protestant church from 2017. He has been interviewed by people and has gained attention as a media personality. Some of these interviews are posted on YouTube.

== Political views ==
He is an Independent politician. He has questioned the mainstream education system. He warned the Indonesian government and public of rethinking their acceptance on the International Treaty on Pandemic Prevention, Preparedness and Response, "because it is against the stance of pro-people".

Being an evangelist, Pongrekun preached about the need of simple life and to some extent spreading luddite and even fear of technology. In the preaching. Based on the wealth report that he required to submit for his candidacy, Pongrekun does not have a single car.

Pongrekun also held views similar to far-right politicians. He often disseminated many fringe science and conspiracy theories against government policies in vaccines and healthcare.

== Rank ==
- Police Second Lieutenant (July 26, 1988)
- Police First Lieutenant (April 1, 1991)
- Police Captain (October 1, 1995)
- Police Commissioner (October 1, 1999)
- Police Adjunct Senior Commissioner (July 1, 2003)
- Police Senior Commissioner (July 1, 2011)
- Police Brigadier General (February 18, 2016)
- Police Inspector General (July 12, 2018)
- Police Commissioner General (August 28, 2019)

== Honours ==
=== National honours ===
During his service in the police force, Dharma Pongrekun received the following awards and decorations:

- National Police Meritorious Service Star, 2nd Class (Indonesian: Bintang Bhayangkara Pratama)
- National Police Meritorious Service Star, 3rd Class (Indonesian: Bintang Bhayangkara Nararya)
- Police Long Service Medal, 24 Years (Indonesian: Satyalancana Pengabdian XXIV Tahun)
- Police Long Service Medal, 16 Years (Indonesian: Satyalancana Pengabdian XVI Tahun)
- Police Long Service Medal, 8 Years (Indonesian: Satyalancana Pengabdian VIII Tahun)
- Medal for Police Education (Indonesian: Satyalancana Bhakti Pendidikan)
- Medal for Advancing Police Organization (Indonesian: Satyalancana Jana Utama)
- Medal for Meritorious Policing Duty (Indonesian: Satyalancana Ksatria Bhayangkara)
- Medal for Concrete Work in the Police Force (Indonesian: Satyalancana Karya Bhakti)
- Medal for Police Operation (Indonesian: Satyalancana Operasi Kepolisian)
- Military Operation Service Medal in Aceh (Indonesian: Satyalancana G.O.M VII)
- Medal for Police Duty in International Peacekeeping (Indonesian: Satyalencana Bhakti Buana)
- Medal for Police Duty in Remote Regions (Indonesian: Satyalancana Bhakti Nusa)
- Medal for National Defense Service (Indonesian: Satyalancana Dharma Nusa)
- Medal for Active International Military Duty (Indonesian: Satyalancana Santi Dharma)

=== Foreign honours ===
United Nations:

- United Nations Transitional Administration for Eastern Slavonia, Baranja and Western Sirmium (UNTAES) Medal
