= Anton Apriantono =

Indonesian academic (born 1959)

Anton Apriyantono
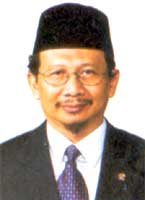

25th Minister of Agriculture of Indonesia
- In office 21 October 2004 – 20 October 2009
- President: Susilo Bambang Yudhoyono
- Preceded by: Bungaran Saragih
- Succeeded by: Suswono

Personal details
- Born: 5 October 1959 (age 66) Serang, West Java, Indonesia
- Party: Prosperous Justice Party
- Education: HMI
- Profession: Politician

Anton Apriantono (born 5 October 1959, in Serang, Banten) is an Indonesian academic who was Indonesia's Minister of Agriculture between October 2004 and October 2009. He studied at the University of Reading and currently is a faculty in Department of Food Science and Technology at Bogor Agricultural University.

Apriantono is also the President commissioner of Tiga Pilar.
