= Hanindhito Himawan Pramana =

Indonesian politician (born 1992)

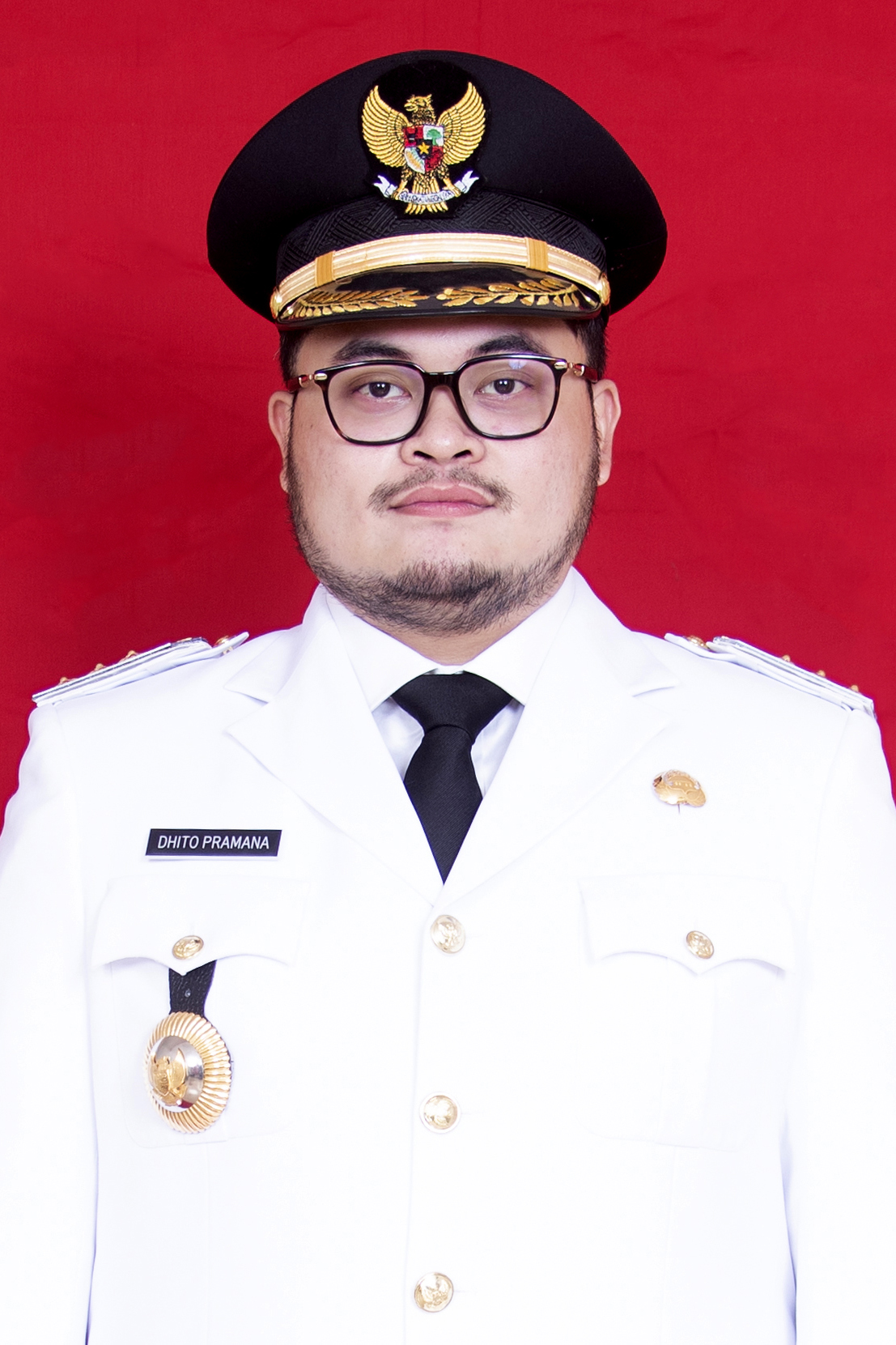

25th Regent of Kediri
- Incumbent
- Assumed office 26 February 2021
- President: Joko Widodo; Prabowo Subianto
- Governor: Khofifah Indar Parawansa; Adhy Karyono (Act.); Khofifah Indar Parawansa
- Deputy: Dewi Mariya Ulfa
- Preceded by: Haryanti Sutrisno; Dede Sujana (D.e.)

Personal details
- Born: July 31, 1992 (age 34) Yogyakarta, Indonesia
- Party: Indonesian Democratic Party of Struggle
- Spouse: Eriani Annisa
- Children: 2
- Parents: Pramono Anung (father); Endang Nugrahani (mother)
- Education: Gadjah Mada University (S.H.)
- Profession: Politician

Hanindhito Himawan Pramana or also familiarly called Mas Dhito (born 31 July 1992) is an Indonesian politician from the Indonesian Democratic Party of Struggle who served as Regent of Kediri for the 2021–2025 and 2025–2030 term. He served for a second term since 20 February 2025 after being inaugurated by President Prabowo Subianto at the Istana Negara, Jakarta. He also served as Chairman of the Kediri Regency Branch Leadership Council of the PDI-P for the 2025–2030 term.

In the 2024 Kediri regency election, Dhito again ran for Regent of Kediri for the 2025–2030 term, with the same vice, Dewi Mariya Ulfa. This pair of candidates won, winning 489.900 votes or 56,53% of the total valid votes.

Political offices
Preceded by Haryanti Sutrisno; Dede Sujana (D.e.)	Regent of Kediri; 2021–2025, 2025–now	Succeeded by Incumbent
