= Heru Budi Hartono =

Indonesian bureaucrat (born 1965)

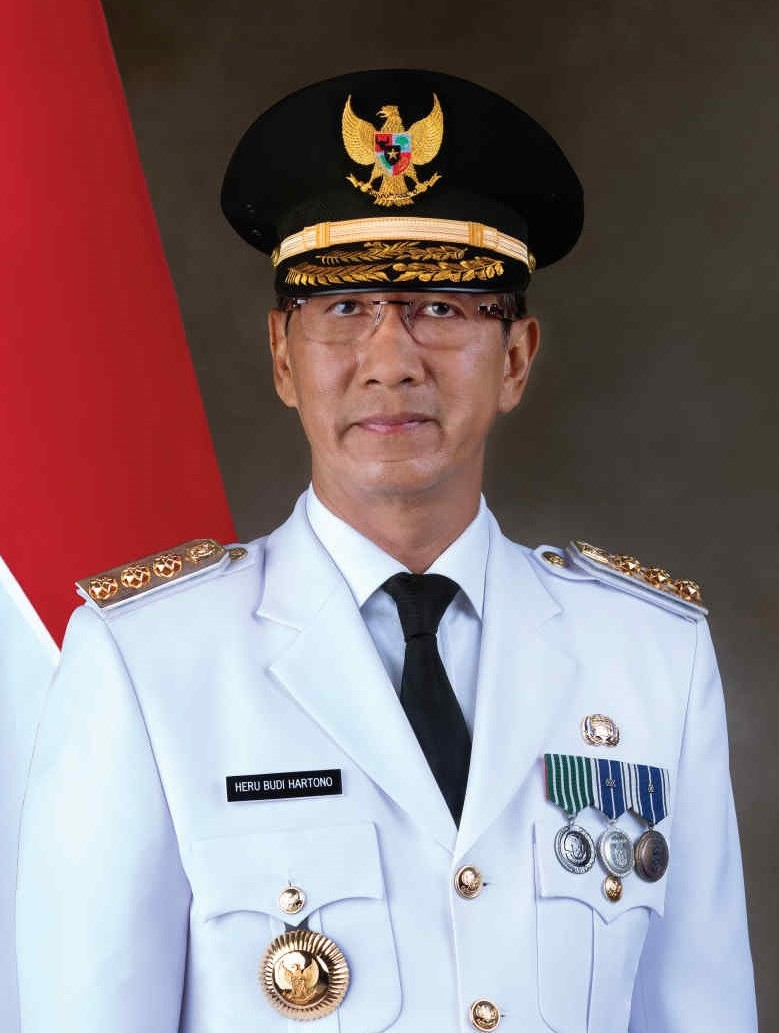
- Official portrait, 2022

Acting Governor of Jakarta
- In office 17 October 2022 – 18 October 2024
- Preceded by: Anies Baswedan
- Succeeded by: Teguh Setyabudi (acting)

Head of the Presidential Secretariat of Indonesia
- In office 20 July 2017 – 20 October 2024
- President: Joko Widodo; Prabowo Subianto
- Preceded by: Dharmansjah Djumala
- Succeeded by: Ariyo Windutomo

Mayor of North Jakarta
- In office 13 January 2014 – 27 January 2015
- Governor: Joko Widodo; Basuki Tjahaja Purnama
- Preceded by: Bambang Sugiyono
- Succeeded by: Rustam Effendi

Personal details
- Born: 13 December 1965 (age 60) Kolang, Central Tapanuli, Indonesia
- Party: Independent
- Spouse: Mirdiyanti
- Education: Krisnadwipayana University (M.M.)
- Occupation: Bureaucrat

Heru Budi Hartono (born 13 December 1965) is an Indonesian bureaucrat who has been the acting Governor of Jakarta since 2022 and Head of the Presidential Secretariat since 2017. He was the former Head of Jakarta Regional Asset Financial Management Agency under Governor Basuki Tjahaja Purnama between 2015 and 2017. A former mayor of North Jakarta, Heru was appointed by Governor Basuki to be a candidate for deputy governor in the 2017 Jakarta Regional Head Elections if he only advanced through an independent path. He served as the acting Governor of Jakarta, replacing Anies Baswedan 17 October 2022, until the 2024 Jakarta election.

== Personal life ==
Heru was born on 13 December 1965 in Kolang, Central Tapanuli, North Sumatra. Heru started his education at the Central Jakarta State Elementary School no. 8. He studied there until the 3rd grade. He later moved to Pakistan along with his parents, where he finished his elementary education there. Heru returned to Jakarta in 1977 and continued his education at the PSKD Junior High School, a Christian-based highschool in Central Jakarta. Upon graduating from PSKD Junior High School, he moved again to the Netherlands and pursued his high school education there until 1984.

Heru returned to Indonesia after finishing his high school education and studied economics in the Krisnadwipayana University. He graduated from the university in 1990 with a bachelor's degree in economics. He attended a course on taxation held by the Artha Bhakti Foundation before entering civil service. Several years later, in 1995, Heru returned to the university to pursue postgraduate studies in management. He later earned a postgraduate degree in management from the university in 1998.

== Bureaucratic career ==
=== North Jakarta and Jakarta regional government ===
Heru started his career at the North Jakarta's city government in 1993, where he served as a special staff to the mayor. He was later moved to the city's program planning bureau in 1995. During this period, Heru was instructed to study general administration in a training program held by the city's education and training bureau. He also attended courses held for civil servants by the Institute of Economic and Community Research, the think tank of the Faculty of Economics of the University of Indonesia.

In 1999, Heru was promoted to head the city government's reporting control subsection. He held this position until 2002. In the following years, he was rotated to several different positions in the North Jakarta city government, such as the head of the facilities and infrastructure subsection from 2002 until 2007, head of the general section from 2007 until 2008, and head of the urban facilities administration section from 2008 until 2013. During his tenure as the latter, Heru was involved in the eviction of the BMW city park residents, who were establishing squatter settlements in the area. The provincial Jakarta government later constructed 900 meters of fence around the garden to prevent squatters from inhabiting the park.

After several years of working in the North Jakarta city government, Heru was promoted to serve in the provincial government. Heru was appointed by the-then Governor of Jakarta, Joko Widodo, as the head of the province's regional head and international cooperation, on 14 February 2013. During this period, Heru proposed a ban on the use of personal vehicles every Sunday of the first week of the month for chiefs of provincial and municipal agencies. He set an example himself by using bus, angkot, and bajaj instead of state-provided cars to go to work in the city hall. The ban was later implemented through a gubernatorial instruction enacted in late 2013.

After a year serving in the provincial government, Heru was appointed as the Mayor of North Jakarta, with his inauguration being held at the BMW city park on 12 January 2014.

=== Acting Governor of Jakarta ===
After Anies Baswedan completed his term of office, Heru took over as acting governor on 17 October 2022. As acting governor, one of Heru's top priorities is to mitigate flooding in Jakarta. To do so, he resumed the dredging process left by his predecessor, focusing on reclamation near the coast, expanding pumps throughout Jakarta to reduce the severity of flooding, and continuing the normalisation of the Ciliwung river. Another one of Heru's main goals as governor is to eradicate extreme poverty in Jakarta by 2024 by strengthening economic and basic public services.

On 3 March 2023, the provincial government budgeted a Rp 2.3 billion jeep for Heru which underwent public scrutiny. Heru claims that he wasn't aware and will "check later". According to him, he was only aware of the city's plan to purchase electric vehicles for public officials. On 13 March, Heru stated that he won't change his car, a Kijang, to a Jeep. In 2023, Heru proposed working hours in Jakarta be split, with some starting at 8 AM and others at 10 AM, in order to split the city's rush hour traffic.

== Controversies ==
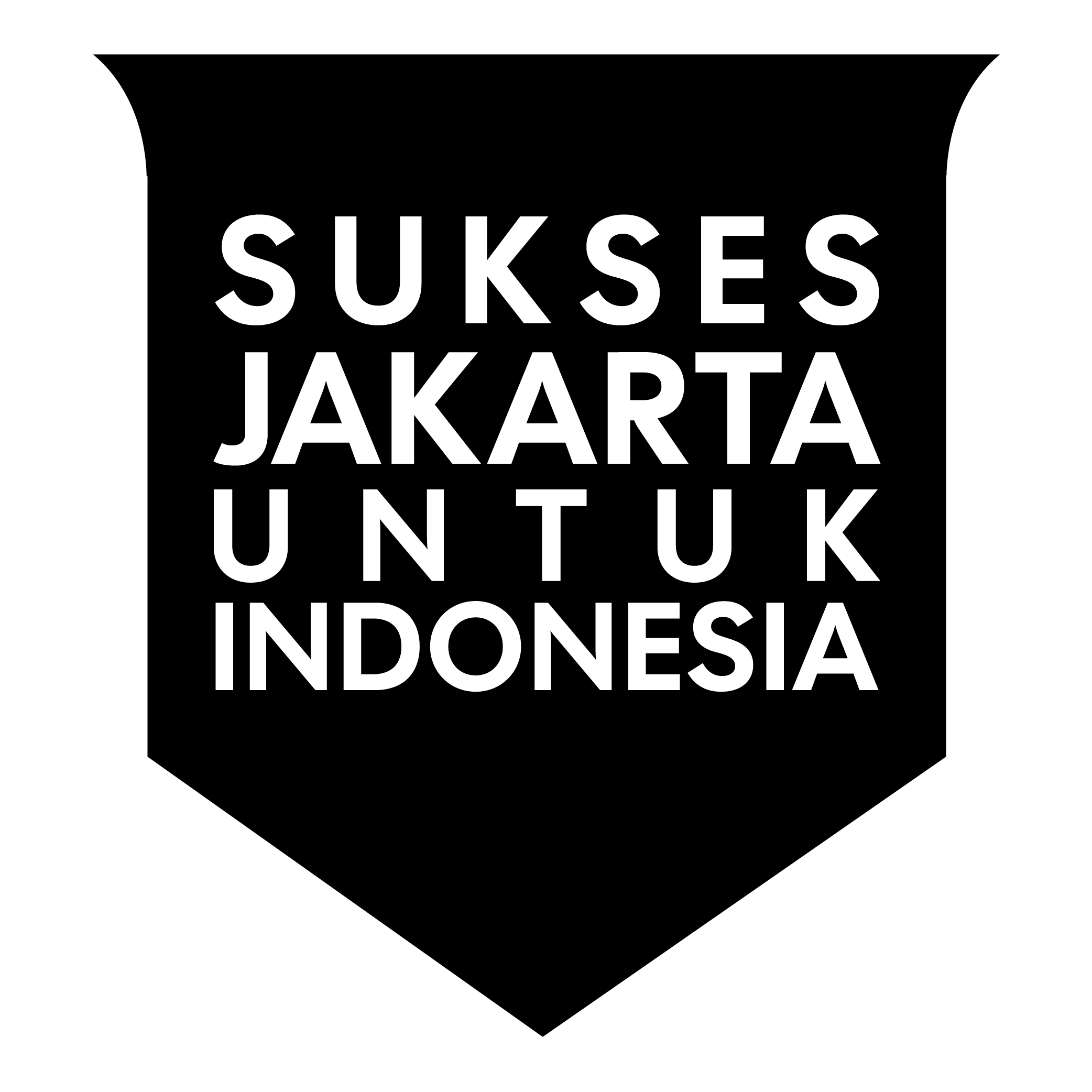
Jakarta's Success for Indonesia Logo (Slogan)

Heru Budi created the logo Sukses Jakarta Untuk Indonesia (Jakarta's Success for Indonesia) which allegedly replaced the Plus Jakarta logo for his leadership, but was denied by himself because the slogan was only to replace the slogan Maju Kotanya, Bahagia Warganya (Forward the City, Happy Citizens) sparked by Former Governor Anies Baswedan.

On 16 April 2023, Heru went under flak by internet users and Indonesian cycling advocacy group Bike2Work in his decision to tear down a pedestrian and cycle path back to a road with the goal of reducing traffic. This was done at the intersection between Jalan Santa and Jalan Kapten Tendean where the old path was built during Anies' tenure.

In March 2024, Heru Budi unilaterally revoked half of the (Kartu Jakarta Mahasiswa Unggul) KJMU scholarship recipients without reconfirmation, resulting in 12,000 poor students being threatened with dropping out of college. This policy was canceled due to pressure from the DPR and the DKI Jakarta DPRD.
