= Saleh Lasata =

Indonesian politician

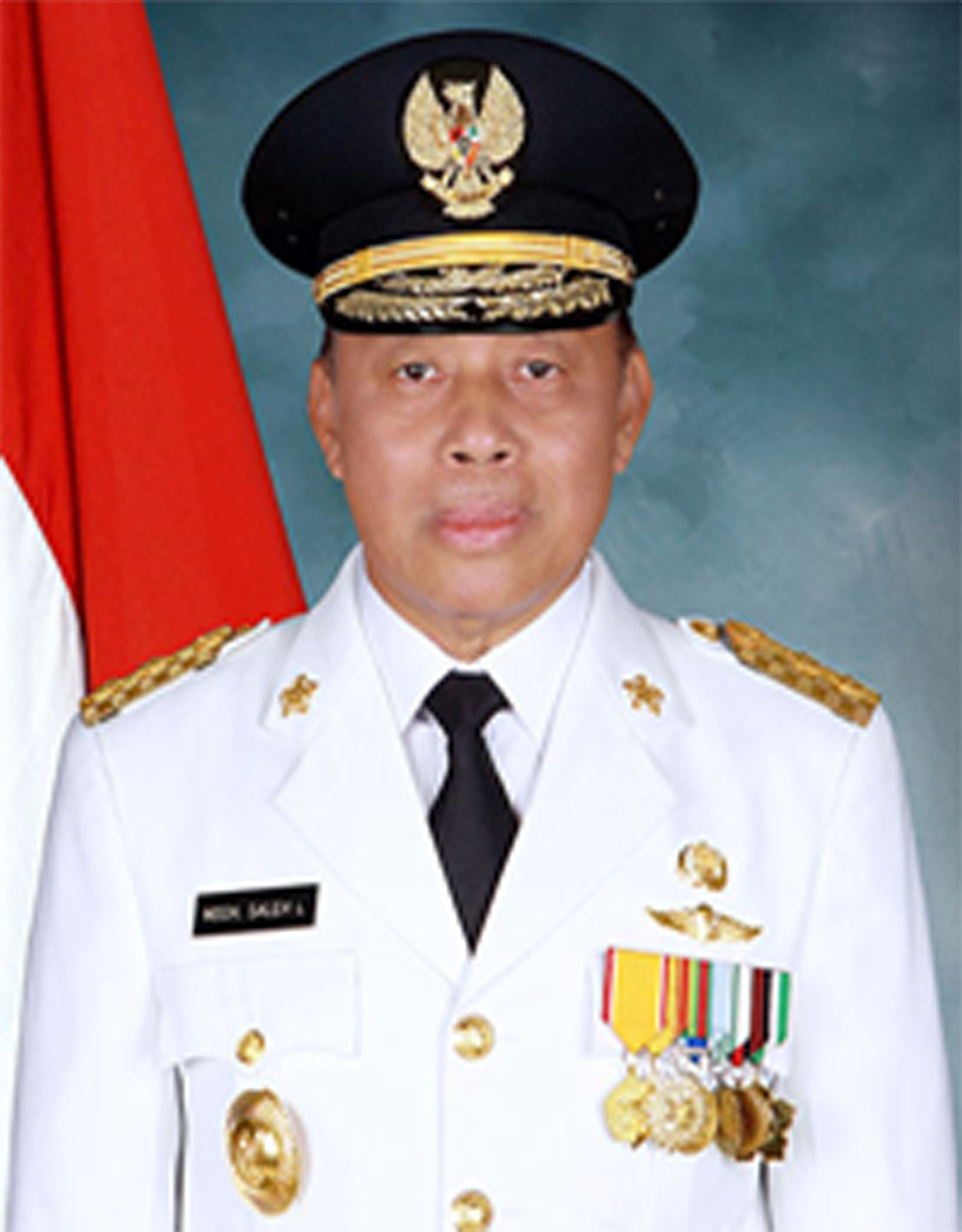
- Saleh Lasata, Deputy Governor of Southeast Sulawesi

Acting Governor of Southeast Sulawesi
- In office 6 July 2017 – 18 February 2018
- President: Joko Widodo
- Preceded by: Nur Alam
- Succeeded by: Teguh Setyabudi (acting)

Personal details
- Born: 17 July 1942 (age 84) Raha, Muna Island, Southeast Sulawesi, Indonesia
- Citizenship: Indonesian
- Party: National Mandate Party
- Spouse: Itoh Tohariah
- Education: Indonesian Military Academy

Saleh Lasata is an Indonesian politician and former governor of Southeast Sulawesi province. Prior to serving as governor, he also served as deputy governor of the province.

On 6 July 2017, Lasata was promoted from deputy governor to acting governor by Home Affairs Minister Tjahjo Kumolo after the Corruption Eradication Commission named Nur Alam, the former governor, as a suspect in a graft case. The Alam-Lasata ticket had proven controversial earlier. At the inauguration of Lasata's first term as deputy governor and Alam's second term as governor in 2013, student groups protested due to earlier accusations of graft by the Commission, though the Supreme Court of Indonesia ruled in Alam-Lasata's favor when their victory was challenged by rival candidates.

Lasata stepped down as governor on 18 February 2018 and was replaced by Minister Kumolo with Teguh Setyabudi. Lasata joined Setyabudi for the inauguration and praised it as an honor for the people, going so far as to publicly apologize for errors during his and Alam's administration.
