= Nur Alam =

Governor of South East Sulawesi

Nur Alam Islam
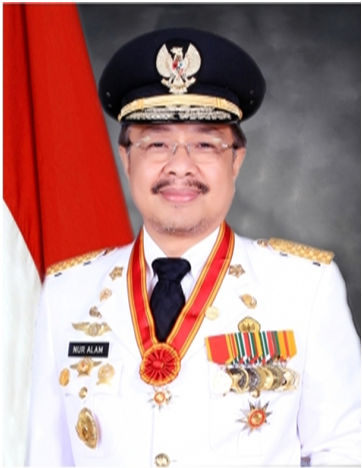

Governor of Southeast Sulawesi
- In office 18 February 2008 – 5 July 2017
- President: Susilo Bambang Yudhoyono
- Preceded by: Zainal Arifin
- Succeeded by: Saleh Lasata (acting)

Personal details
- Born: 9 July 1967 (age 58) Konda, South Konawe Regency, Southeast Sulawesi, Indonesia
- Citizenship: Indonesian
- Party: National Mandate Party

Nur Alam (born 9 July 1967) is a former Governor of South East Sulawesi. He was inaugurated for his first five-year term in 2008, and for his second in 2013.

The inauguration of Alam's second term proved controversial. Student groups protested due to Alam's implication in a graft case by the Corruption Eradication Commission, though the Supreme Court of Indonesia upheld the victory when Alam's election rival filed a legal challenge. Formal graft accusations by the Commission in 2017 eventually led Home Affairs Minister Tjahjo Kumolo to promote Alam's deputy Saleh Lasata to acting governor in July that year.

He was sentenced by the Jakarta Corruption Court in April 2018 to 12 years in prison, with official estimated losses of the state at Rp 1.5 trillion.
