= Muhammad Taufik =

Indonesian politician (1957–2023)

Mohamad Taufik
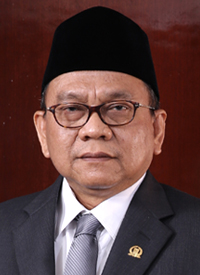
- Official portrait, 2014

Deputy Speaker of Jakarta DPRD
- In office 16 September 2014 – 1 June 2022 Serving with 2014–2019: Triwisaksana; Abraham Lunggana (2014–2018); Ichwan Jayadi (2018–2019); Ferrial Sofyan (2014–2019); Santoso (2019); 2019–2024: Abdurrahman Suhaimi; Misan Samsuri; Zita Anjani
- Speaker: Prasetyo Edi Marsudi
- Preceded by: Boy Sadikin
- Succeeded by: Rani Mauliani

Member of Jakarta DPRD
- In office 25 August 2009 – 3 May 2023
- Succeeded by: Bastian Simanjuntak
- Constituency: DKI Jakarta 3

Personal details
- Born: 3 January 1957 Jakarta, Indonesia
- Died: 3 May 2023 (aged 66) Jakarta, Indonesia
- Party: Golkar (until 1998); PKP (1998–1999); Independent (1999–2008); Gerindra (2008–2022)
- Spouse: Sri Wahyuni
- Occupation: Businessman; Politician

Mohamad Taufik (3 January 1957 – 3 May 2023) was an Indonesian politician who was a member of the Jakarta Regional People's Representative Council (Jakarta DPRD) from 25 August 2009 until his death in 2023. He was a member of the Gerindra Party for most of his legislature career, but resigned from the party in October 2022. Having been convicted of corruption in 2004, he received significant attention in 2019 when he successfully filed a lawsuit against the General Elections Commission to run for his second term in the legislative body.

== Background ==
Muhammad Taufik was born in Jakarta on 3 January 1957. He studied at an economic middle school in Banten, and later an economic high school in Jakarta, before obtaining his bachelors in accounting from Jayabaya University.

== Career ==
Taufik was a member, and later secretary general, of the Indonesian Maritime Workers' Association. His political career began as a member of Golkar, and he later moved to the Justice and Unity Party, but he resigned in 1999. Taufik was later appointed chairman of the Jakarta branch of the General Elections Commission (KPU), but he was sentenced guilty of corruption in 2004 and was imprisoned for 18 months.

=== Councillor ===
In the 2009 Indonesian legislative election, Taufik ran as a Gerindra candidate for the Jakarta DPRD and won a seat after winning 21,624 votes. He was later reelected in 2014, and appointed deputy speaker of the body. Following the 2014 presidential election, in which Prabowo Subianto lost, Taufik demanded the head of KPU be arrested, accusing him of cheating by opening ballot boxes. This statement, delivered in front of a crowd protesting the results, caused KPU officials to report Taufik to the police.

In the same year, after the resignation of previous governor Joko Widodo, Taufik was brought up as a possible candidate to replace either his gubernatorial seat or the deputy governor seat – which was held by Basuki Tjahaja Purnama (Ahok), who strongly protested Taufik's appointment. Later on, the two would come into conflict often, with Taufik boycotting Ahok during his blasphemy trial.

Taufik later proposed that the city government entirely subsidize ticket fees for the Jakarta MRT.

=== 2019 election ===
For the 2019 election, KPU had introduced a new regulation barring, among others, candidates who had been convicted of graft before from running. Despite this, Taufik registered for reelection, and KPU demanded his party remove him from the candidates list. Taufik then filed an appeal to the Supreme Court of Indonesia, with the Elections Supervisory Agency approving him to run. Eventually, he was approved by Jakarta's KPU as one of the candidates. He was elected into the legislature, remaining as deputy speaker and chairman of the Gerindra faction.

=== Later career ===
However, he was removed from both posts on 1 June 2022 following his endorsement of Anies Baswedan's presidential candidacy against party line. He was replaced the following day by fellow Gerindra legislator Rani Mauliani. In October 2022, he submitted his resignation from Gerindra and the Jakarta DPRD for health reasons, as he suffered from lung cancer. The Corruption Eradication Commission conducted a search of Taufik's legislator office in January 2023 in relation to a land procurement case, with Gerindra representatives noting that Taufik was no longer associated with the party.

== Personal life and death ==
Taufik was married to Sri wahyuni, and the couple had three children.

Taufik's brother Mohamad Sanusi, is also a Gerindra politician, but was jailed for corruption in 2016 for receiving bribes from developers of Pantai Indah Kapuk.

Taufik died on 3 May 2023, around 9:40 PM local time. He was 66, and had been receiving treatment for his lung cancer at the Siloam Hospital in Central Jakarta. He was buried at the Al Azhar Memorial Cemetery in Karawang on 4 May.
