= Zita Anjani =

Indonesian politician

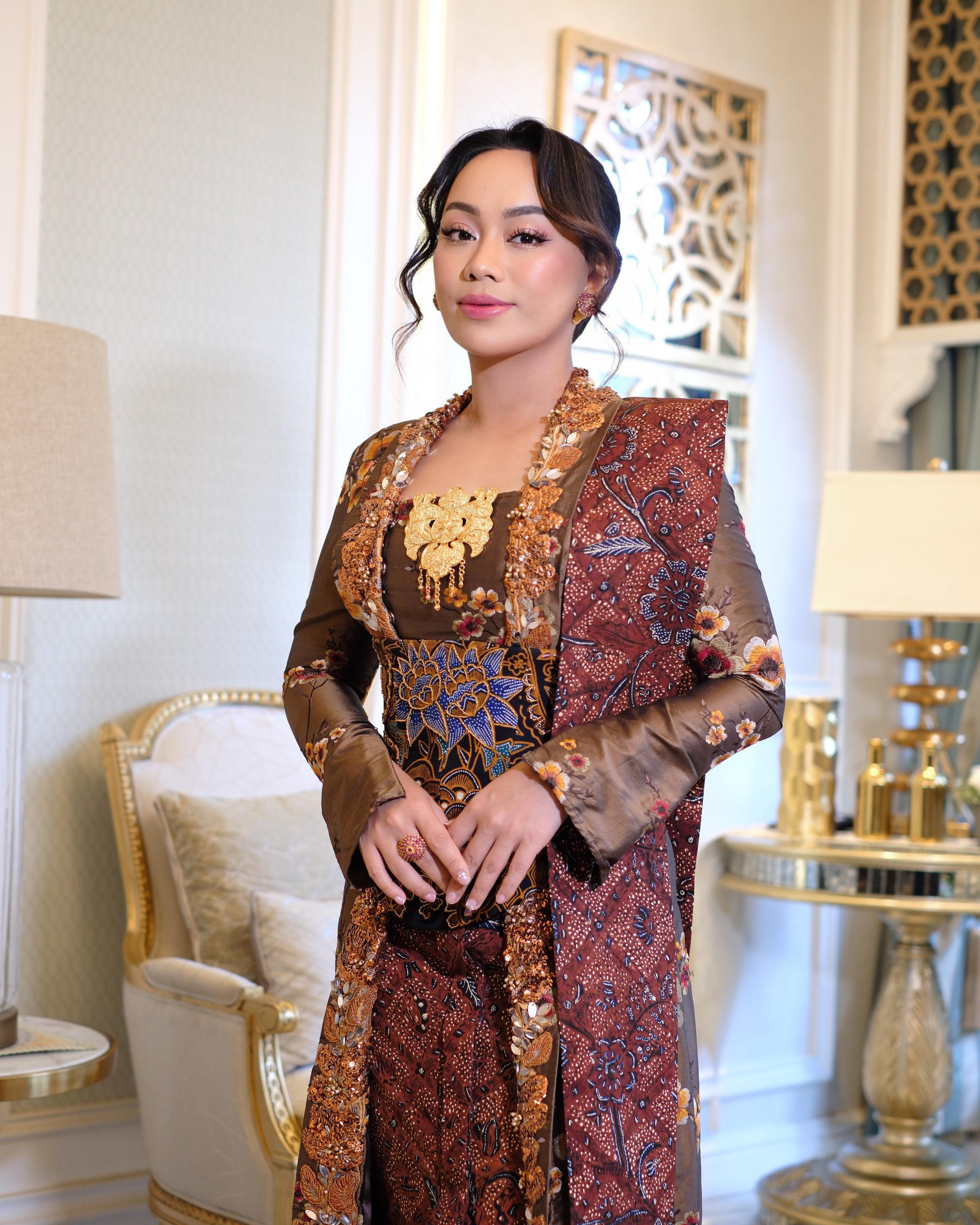

Presidential Special Envoy for Tourism
- Incumbent
- Assumed office 21 October 2024

Deputy Speaker of Jakarta Regional House of Representatives
- In office 2019–2024 Serving with: Mohamad Taufik (2019–22); Rani Mauliani (2022–24); Abdurrahman Suhaimi (2019–22); Khoirudin (2022–24); Misan Samsuri

Member of Jakarta Regional House of Representatives
- In office 2019–2024
- Parliamentary group: National Mandate Party Fraction
- Constituency: DKI Jakarta 5

Personal details
- Born: March 12, 1990 (age 36) Jakarta, Indonesia
- Spouse: Radityo Egi Pratama
- Children: 3
- Parent(s): Zulkifli Hasan; Soraya Zulkifli Hasan
- Education: University College London; Pelita Harapan University
- Occupation: Politician; Education, Social and Political Activist

Zita Anjani (born 12 March 1990) is an Indonesian activist, teacher and politician who became the deputy speaker of the Jakarta Regional House of Representatives (DPRD) from 2019 to 2024. Since she is the only woman holding the a high position at the DPRD Jakarta, her name has become quite popular. She also actively participates in politics, social issues, and education.

== Education ==
At a relatively young age, Zita completed her S1 education (majored in International Relations) at Pelita Harapan University in the Department of International Relations. She also holds a diploma from Sunshine Teachers Training (Diploma Montessori Education) and a master's degree in science from University College London (UCL).

== Career ==
=== Teaching career ===
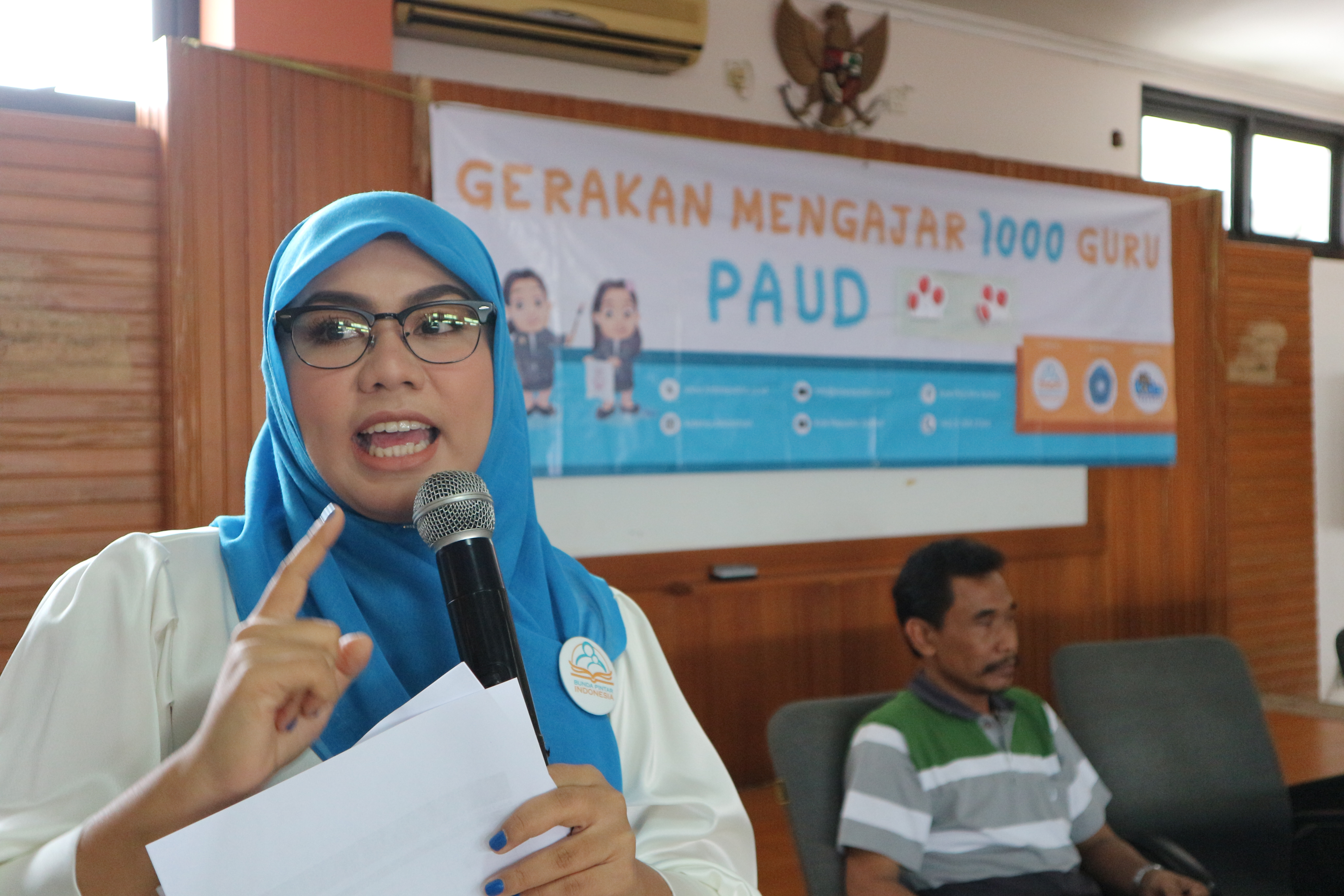
A briefing given by Zita in 2016

Zita's school, Kids Republic, was established in East Jakarta and Bekasi, and it has now expanded to include a National High School in Lampung. Furthermore, she is a member of the board of trustees at Bunda Pintar Indonesia, a nonprofit that houses an early child education teacher association. This gave her motivation to quit her job at World Health Organization (WHO) and devote herself to the field of child education. The company's primary objective is to help kids develop into leaders from an early age by making the most of their education between the ages of one and five.

In East Jakarta, Bunda Pintar Indonesia organised a campaign once more to train kindergarten teachers and 1000 instructors with early childhood education. In a written statement on 8 December 2016, Zita, the Coach of Bunda Pintar Indonesia, stated, "Not only reading, writing, and counting but also using media as a tool for learning." According to her, the purpose of this exercise was to educate kindergarten teachers in particular about education in Indonesia. "Themes given to teachers will also vary, such as drawing, golden seminar, psychology in children, cooking class, and many more," she stated.

=== Political career ===
Zita acknowledged that she preferred to give education and pro-women and pro-child measures top priority. Of the five leaders of the Jakarta DPRD DKI, she was reportedly the sole female. "First, instruction. because my background is in education. Secondly, funds and policies that support women and children, of course. In order for the budget and policy to support women and children going forward, I am the only woman in the leadership element and I represent women," Zita stated on 3 October 2019.

Zita made the decision to enter politics in 2018 and run as the National Mandate Party's (PAN) legislative candidate for 2019. The primary driving force behind this decision is the support of early childhood education instructors, who require a voice. With 14,701 votes, she was able to secure a seat in the Jakarta DPRD DKI for 2019.

The PAN recommended her as the Jakarta DPRD DKI's vice chairman in August 2019. When she was finally named Vice Chairman in October 2019, she was the organisation's youngest leader and the only female in that role.

==== Legal literacy ====
According to Zita, the primary objective of this regional regulation's dissemination was to increase legal literacy among Jakartans, as of 20 January 2020. She further underlined that, for the next three days, each member was required to spread awareness of two regional regulations in two distinct regions, with the assistance of resource people and knowledgeable moderators in the relevant fields.

Perda Number 3 of 2013 about garbage was one of the regional regulations that Zita would socialise in the meantime, saying that the garbage regulations are crucial in teaching the locals proper waste management practices during the rainy season, when many regions flood.

==== Controversy ====
Zita received an invitation to donate to support Palestinian children on 1 November 2023. She claimed to have given a IDR 250 million Rolex gold watch to a charity that aids children in Palestine. She also extends an invitation to everyone to take part in contribution drives. Instead of being praised, her good intentions were met with criticism from numerous online users who wanted to know if her father had really given her hundreds of millions of dollars' worth of expensive items. Some online users believe that the purpose of the watch giving is merely to garner support during the ongoing conflict between Israel and Palestine in Indonesia.

== Personal life ==
Born on 12 March 1990, in Jakarta. Her father Zulkifli Hasan pledged to supervise all DKI Jakarta Provincial Government initiatives. Additionally, Zita has an elder sister, Putri Zulkifli Hasan, who is also active in politics. At first, she claimed, her aptitude as a teacher grew when she gave his younger brother Haikal study guidelines. "My sister was my first student," the woman stated. Zita said that her background as a schoolteacher did not stop her from attempting to participate in parliament. Kaleela Aisyah and Kaisara Alisha are Zita's two daughters, who she married Radityo Egi Pratama in 2012.
