= Achmad Yani (politician) =

Indonesian politician

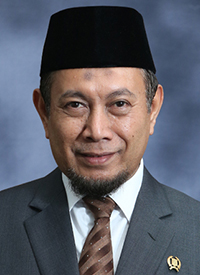
- Official portrait, 2019

Member of Jakarta Regional House of Representatives
- Incumbent
- Assumed office 25 August 2014

Personal details
- Born: 7 June 1963 (age 62); Jakarta, Indonesia
- Political party: PKS

Achmad Yani (born 7 June 1963) is an Indonesian politician of the Prosperous Justice Party (PKS) who is currently serving as a member of the Jakarta Regional House of Representatives. He has served in the body for two terms starting in 2014, and currently serves as the faction head for PKS in the legislature.

== Biography ==
Achmad Yani was born on 7 June 1963 in Jakarta. In 1998, he had become the Justice Party chairman in its South Jakarta branch, serving until 2001. He was first elected into Jakarta's legislature following the 2014 election, as a member of the Prosperous Justice Party (PKS). He was reelected for a second term in the 2019 election.

In August 2021, following the death of the previous PKS faction head in the parliament, Achmad was appointed as the new faction head. In April 2022, he called for Jakarta's provincial government to close down night clubs during Ramadhan. He also opposed the construction of bike tracks by the provincial government within gated communities.

He is married to Muzdalifah, and the couple has eight children.
