= Anthony Winza Probowo =

Indonesian lawyer and politician

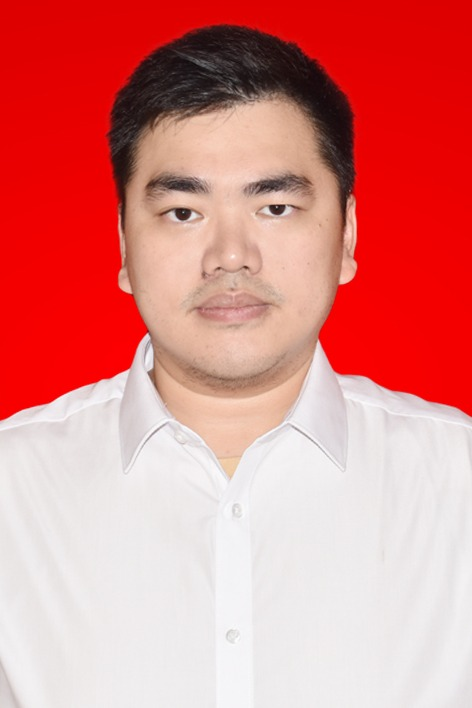

Anthony Winza Probowo SH., LL.M. MPA was a member of the Jakarta Regional People’s Representative Council who takes office as PSI’s party faction’s secretary. He also a member of Commission B and C (a working committee in the parliament which covers the region’s finances and economic affairs)– and a member of the Jakarta Regional People’s Representative Council’s Local Government Regulation Legislative Board, and Member of the Honorary Board of Ethics at the Jakarta Parliament during the 2019-2024 period.

Anthony is a Master of Public Administration graduate from Harvard University (HKS) and Master of Laws graduate from Georgetown University in the United States of America. His studies at Georgetown were fully funded by the Indonesian government through the Indonesian Endowment Fund for Education.

During his time in Georgetown University, Anthony conducted research that compared French and Indonesian constitutional law, specifically those that involve the mechanism of Judicial Preview vs. Judicial Review between Indonesia and France. While studying for his Master’s Degree, he also found a virtual think-tank under the name Forum Generasi Sinergi that houses thousands of graduate and post-graduate students from all over the world.

Anthony also achieved First Place for 3 times in a variety of debate competitions that cover constitutional law and business law, both in regional and national levels. Among them are competitions hosted by the Indonesian Constitutional Court, Padjajaran University, and University of Indonesia. He also received an Outstanding Achievement Award from Pelita Harapan University.

Representing the PSI faction in Committee C, Anthony often criticizes regional budget allocations that are suspicious, and is vocal on opposing Anies Baswedan – Governor of Jakarta’s policy that aims to host the Formula-E Race in Jakarta. The race would have a budget of trillions, and it was proposed when Jakarta was in the midst of battling budget deficits and clean water crisis.

Anthony also criticized the budget allocation for the procurement of computers/servers that reached up to hundreds of millions of rupiahs in the 2020 Jakarta Regional Budget. The allocation created a polemic within the Jakarta Regional People’s Representative Council because of an accusation made by councilwoman from the PDIP Faction - Cinta Mega, accusing Anthony of divulging regional plans of the hundreds of millions computer/server procurement to the media. According to Cinta Mega, the accusation is proven by the reporting of media of the said budget allocation. Anthony brushed aside the accusations, because the meetings held for regional budget allocations are open to the public, and therefore the media; the media did coverage of the meeting by being present in the room, and they simply quoted Anthony’s questions to the Jakarta Provincial Government regarding the said procurement. There was no active action from Anthony’s side that divulged or spread plans regarding the computer/server procurement to the media; neither in forms of release or answering interviews by the media. Due to the polemic, all members of Committee C proceeded to report Anthony to the Ethics Council to be ethically put on trial.

In the end of 2019, Anthony also returned unused funds as much as Rp 150 million that were allocated for recess activities to the Jakarta Regional Treasury.

In 2020, Anthony did a walk-out during a plenary assembly which agenda was to ask for spoken approval of the council members for the implementation of the regional budget by the Governor of Jakarta. The approval would hold the council members accountable of said implementation, and the walk-out was done because the budget realization data that was asked by the PSI Faction was never delivered. During the assembly, about 100 of the microphones that were supposed to be placed on top of the council members’ desks were nowhere to be found. Due to the missing microphones, Anthony walked to the podium (one of the only places that had a microphone) in the middle of the assembly to conduct an interruption, before finally walking-out of the assembly.

Inspired by the Endowment Fund managed by the Indonesian Endowment Fund for Education, Anthony Winza created a draft for local regulation that covers the creation of an Endowment Fund for Food Insecurity that was proposed in the Regional Regulation Formation Program for 2021, with the hopes that every low-income person and abandoned child would have guaranteed access to free food, as is their right that was guaranteed in The 1945 Indonesian Constitution.

== Education ==
LL.M. (Master of Laws), Georgetown University Law Center, USA. 2015-2016

MPA (Master of Public Administration), Harvard University, Harvard Kennedy School. 2023-2024

== Awards ==
Iris Award Recipient - The Iris Award is a prestigious accolade bestowed upon individuals who have demonstrated exceptional commitment to championing human rights across Indonesia

1st Place - Regional Constitutional Law Debate Competition, hosted by the Indonesian Constitutional Court

1st Place - National Constitutional Law Debate Competition, hosted by Padjajaran University

1st Place - Business Law Debate Competition, hosted by Universitas Indonesia

1st Place - National Youth Parliament - Indonesian Future Leaders

Outstanding Achievement Awards - UPH Awards V

Received foreign Master's Degree scholarship from the Indonesian Endowment Fund for Education
