= Tina Toon =

Indonesian politician and singer

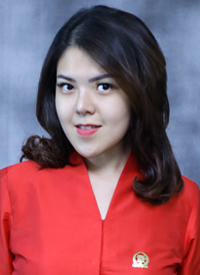
- Official portrait, 2019

Member of Jakarta Regional House of Representatives
- Incumbent
- Assumed office 26 August 2019
- Constituency: 2nd
- Majority: 19,484 (2019); 36,173 (2024)

Personal details
- Born: Agustina Hermanto; August 20, 1993 (age 32) Jakarta, Indonesia
- Party: PDI-P
- Occupation: Celebrity, singer, politician

Agustina Hermanto (born 20 August 1993), better known by her stage name Tina Toon, is an Indonesian politician and former actress and singer. She was known as a child singer in Indonesia in the late 1990s and early 2000s before pursuing an acting career in movies until her young adulthood in the 2010s. Tina Toon is an elected member of the Jakarta Regional House of Representatives from the Indonesian Democratic Party of Struggle since 2019.

== Early life and education ==
Agustina Hermanto was born in Jakarta on 20 August 1993 to a Chinese Indonesian family. She is the oldest of two siblings. She has a bachelor's degree in computer science from BINUS University, in addition to degrees in law from Indonesia Open University (bachelor's) and Tarumanegara University (masters).

== Career ==
=== Entertainment ===
At the age of five in 1998, Tina Toon recorded numerous songs at her uncle's recording studio. Her first album, Bolo-bolo, was released in 1999 to commercial success, selling over 300,000 copies. Afterwards, she was featured in three more albums released in the early 2000s. While continuing to release music albums as a teenager, Tina Toon also featured in some films, including Tina Toon dan Lenong Bocah (2004) and Cinta dalam Kardus (2013). She was known for her overweight figure as a child, but has since lost weight through a diet during her late teens.

=== Politics ===
Tina Toon joined PDI-P as a cadre in 2018, and she ran for a seat in the Jakarta Regional House of Representatives in the 2019 election. She was elected with 19,484 votes to represent Jakarta's 2nd district (Thousand Islands Regency, Cilincing, and Kelapa Gading). During her first term, she frequently criticized lack of government action in handling floods at her constituency. She was reelected for a second term from the same district in the 2024 Indonesian legislative election with 36,173 votes, the highest in her district and third-highest of all candidates.

== Personal life ==
Tina Toon announced marriage in July 2023. She is a Catholic.
