= Zulkifli Hasan =

Indonesian politician and businessman (born 1962)

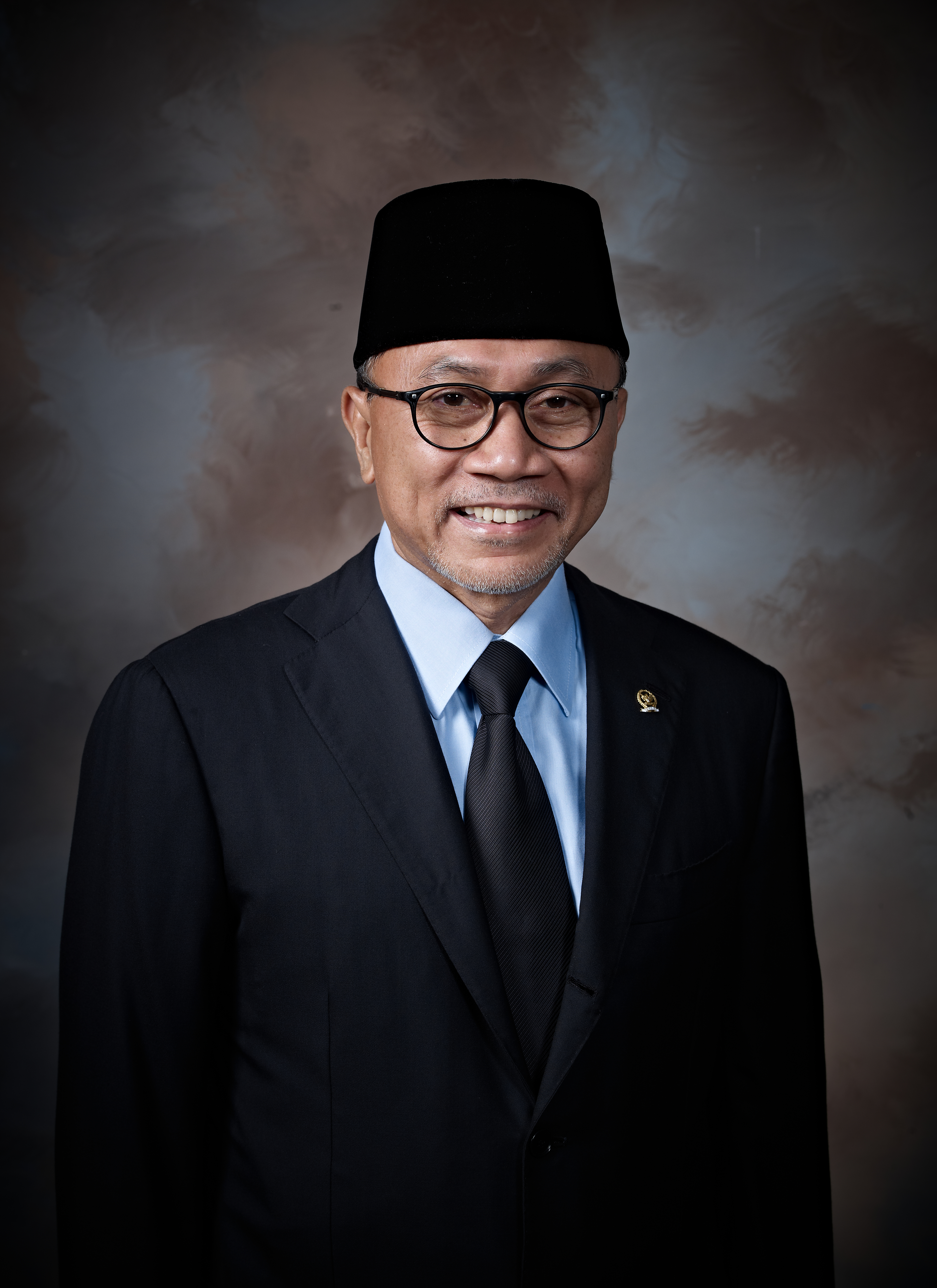
- Official portrait, 2019

14th Speaker of the People's Consultative Assembly
- In office 8 October 2014 – 30 September 2019
- Preceded by: Sidarto Danusubroto
- Succeeded by: Bambang Soesatyo

Deputy Speaker of the People's Consultative Assembly
- In office 3 October 2019 – 15 June 2022 Serving with 9 other people
- Speaker: Bambang Soesatyo

4th General Chairman of National Mandate Party
- Incumbent
- Assumed office 1 March 2015
- Preceded by: Hatta Rajasa

Ministerial roles
- 2009–2014: Minister of Forestry Affairs
- 2022–2024: Minister of Trade
- 2024–present: Coordinating Minister for Food Affairs

Faction represented in House of Representatives
- 2004–2009: National Mandate Party
- 2014–2022: National Mandate Party

Personal details
- Born: Zulkifli Hasan; 17 May 1962 (age 64) Lampung, Indonesia
- Party: National Mandate Party
- Spouse: Soraya
- Relations: Amien Rais (in-law); Helmi Hasan (Brother)
- Children: 4; including Zita Anjani and Putri Zulkifli Hasan
- Education: Krisnadwipayana University
- Occupation: Politician; businessman
- Website: www.zulhasan.com

Zulkifli Hasan (born 17 May 1962), or colloquially Zulhas or Bang Zul, is an Indonesian politician and businessman who is currently serving as Coordinating Minister for Food Affairs in President Prabowo Subianto's Red and White Cabinet since 20 October 2024. Previously, he served as Minister of Trade from 2022 to 2024 and deputy speaker of the People's Consultative Assembly (MPR) from 2019 until 2022. A member of the Islam-based National Mandate Party, he is also currently serving as the party's chairman since 2015. Additionally, he served as speaker of the MPR from 2014 to 2019 and was Minister of Environment and Forestry from 2009 until 2014.

== Childhood and education ==
Zulkifli Hasan was born to Hasan and Siti Zaenab, who were farmers in Pisang village in Penengahan, South Lampung. In later life, he would claim to have experienced economic hardship as a child, saying he learned to work hard by selling eggs produced on the farm. He attended a local elementary school from 1969 to 1975. At age 13, his father took him to Tanjungkarang (now called Bandar Lampung) to enroll him in junior high school level at the State Islamic Teachers Training School (PGAN), against the boy's wishes. While attending PGAN, Zulkifli lived in a rented room in lodgings for boarders. He left PGAN in his fourth year at the school. He took an entrance exam for Madrasah Tsanawiah and passed. Without parental consent, he enrolled at Tandjungkarang State Senior High School. After four months, his father discovered he had switched schools and forced him to leave the high school.

Armed with a little money from his mother, Zul moved to Jakarta. There, he attended State Senior High School 53 and graduated in 1982. In 1986, he enrolled at the Faculty of Economics at Krisnadwipayana University (Unkris) in Jakarta and financed his studies independently. In 2003, he graduated from PPM School of Management.

== Business career ==
Before becoming a politician, Zulkifli worked as a civil servant and then started his business. His father had advised him not to be a follower but to be a leader, even if that meant starting from something small, so he quit the civil service. His older brother, Herli Hasan, says Zulkifli left the civil service because the salary was low.

Zulkifli's subsequent corporate positions included:

- President Director of PT Batin Eka Perkasa (1988–2004), then Commissioner (2004–2005). A Jakarta-based company producing kitchen appliances under the Haneda brand name; now run by Zulkifli's oldest daughter, Futri Zulya Savitri.
- President Director of PT Panamas Mitra Inti Lestari (1997–2004). A Bogor-based company selling home appliances and non-stick cookware.
- President Director of PT Sarana Bina Insani, Jakarta (2000–2004). A travel bureau.
- Commissioner of PT Hudaya Safari Utama, Jakarta (2000–2006). A haj and umroh travel bureau.
- Commissioner of PT Gudang Garam, Jakarta (2006–2007).

=== Youth entrepreneurship ===
After starting his political career, he did not abandon his entrepreneurial interests. He became a motivator for young people and the wider community, particularly in Sumatra, to develop entrepreneurship and create new jobs. He encouraged rural youths to help advance Indonesia's future economic growth. In 2012, he supported a program of the National Mandate Party (PAN) that provided venture capital and training for young entrepreneurs in North Sumatra.

== Early political career ==
Zulkifli was active in the Muhammadiyah mass Muslim organization, whose members were among the founders of the National Mandate Party (PAN) in 1998. His first political forays included chairing the Regional Board of Farmers and Fishermen of Lampung Province, serving as deputy chairman of Lampung Sai Community Society, and initiating the Lampung Youth Union in Jakarta. He chaired Muhammadiyah's Institute of Agricultural Laborers and Fishermen for Jakarta from 2000 to 2005. He chaired the Logistics Department of PAN's Central Board from 2000 to 2005.

He later became deputy chairman of PAN's faction in the House of Representatives, serving as a member of parliament from 2004 to 2009. He was a member of House Commission VI overseeing transportation and infrastructure. In July 2008, he was elected chairman of a special committee that questioned the government's policy to raise fuel prices.

Zulkifli was secretary general of PAN's Central Board from 2005 to 2010. On 8 October 2011, Zulkifli's oldest daughter Futri Zulya Savitri married PAN founder Amien Rais's third son, Ahmad Mumtaz Rais.

== Forestry Minister ==
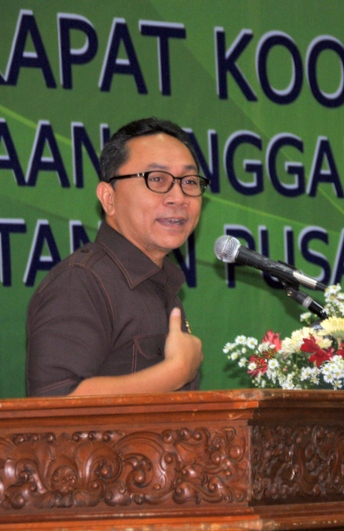
Zulkifli as forestry minister, in 2013

After President Susilo Bambang Yudhoyono was re-elected for a second term in 2009, Zulkifli was appointed forestry minister on 21 October 2009. He said his priorities would be the development of production forests (HTI and HTR), reducing forest fires by 20% annually, combating illegal logging, streamlining of overlapping regulations of the central government and regencies for forest sites, and improving forest industry institutions. He also said he would resist temptations and pressure from businessmen and politicians putting themselves before the public interest. “But temptations are always there everywhere. It’ll pose no problem to us if we just don’t pay attention to them,” he said. Indonesia's Corruption Eradication Commission (KPK) in 2012 declared the Forestry Ministry to be considered the country's most corrupt institution. To support efforts to eradicate corruption, Zulkifli issued circular No.SE.2 / Menhut-II / 2012 on Gratification Reporting at the Ministry of Forestry. The circular encouraged staff at the ministry to report the gratuities they receive to their superiors to report to first-echelon officials and the KPK. Zulkifli served as forestry minister until 1 October 2014.

=== Illegal forest operations ===
In 2010, the Forestry Ministry promised to crack down on plantation companies operating without permits in Indonesia. In 2011, the ministry admitted hundreds of mining and plantation companies were operating in Central Kalimantan province without correct permits. Zulkifli said the problem was due to misinterpretations of regional autonomy legislation introduced in 2001. Elfian Effendi of Greenomics Indonesia said it was difficult for the minister to stop the offending companies because they have political links. The Forestry Ministry promised to stop issuing new plantation and mine permits in the province and to cooperate with the Corruption Eradication Commission (KPK) to enforce the law.

=== Moratorium on new forest concessions ===
In January 2011, Zulkifli announced the Forestry Ministry would implement a 2-year moratorium on the issuance of permits for the conversion of primary and peat forests. Conservationists noted that on the eve of the logging moratorium, the ministry issued 2.9 million hectares of new plantation concessions to 44 firms. On 20 May 2011, President Susilo Bambang Yudhoyono signed a presidential decree putting the two-year moratorium into effect. The decree covered from 64 million to 72 million hectares of primary forest and peatland.

=== Allegation of state losses ===
In May 2013, the Indonesian Forum for Budget Transparency (Fitra) claimed data from the State Audit Agency (BPK) showed the Forestry Ministry had lost or misappropriated Rp 7.1 trillion ($731 million) in 2012. Zulkifli responded by saying the data and description of “losses” were inaccurate. He said the actual figure was Rp 6.2 trillion in non-tax revenue the ministry has been unable to collect since 2002. “We’re continuing to collect on those payments, both at the regional level and at the central level, and to date we’ve whittled down the outstanding amount to just Rp 2.1 trillion,” he said.

=== Interview by Harrison Ford ===
On 9 September 2013, Zulkifli was interviewed by Harrison Ford for part of a documentary series on climate change and the environment. Presidential adviser Andi Arief complained Ford had attacked the minister with rude questions. He accused Ford and his crew of “harassing state institutions” and threatened to deport him.

Zulkifli said Ford was emotional because he wanted illegal loggers swiftly arrested at Tesso Nilo National Park in Sumatra. The minister said Ford did not give him sufficient time to explain the difficulties of catching those who violate forestry laws. He lamented they had not rehearsed the interview before filming commenced. Ford was making part of a series on climate change called Years of Living Dangerously for the US television network Showtime.

=== Hazardous smoke haze ===
During Zulkifli's tenure as forestry minister, forests in Sumatra and Kalimantan were burned to clear land for plantations, causing hazardous haze that reached neighboring Singapore and Malaysia. In 2013, Kuntoro Mangkusubroto, the head of Indonesia's presidential working unit for development supervision and control, said many fires were on land owned by Asia Pulp and Paper (APP) and Asia Pacific Resources International Limited. Zulkifli said there was no strong evidence against the two companies.

In June 2013, Zulkifli blamed the severity of the haze on a five-year weather cycle. "Every five years, the weather becomes extremely dry. The wind is also much stronger and moves in a circular motion. So, when there is burning, fire spreads very quickly... Due to the dry season, it takes time for firefighters to locate the water sources. By the time water is irrigated to the hot spots, the fire would have spread." Responding to allegations that plantation and forestry companies were responsible for the fires, Zulkifli was quoted by Tempo magazine as saying the companies must be defended because they pay taxes. He said 14 people had been arrested on suspicion of starting fires, 11 of them linked to companies and three of them smallholders. "If proven guilty they could be jailed for five years and have their permits revoked," he said.

In March 2014, Zulkifli supported calls by the National Police and Indonesian Military for the shooting of people found burning forests if they resisted arrest. He acknowledged the people responsible for forest fires were seeking to open up new land for palm oil plantations.

In 2015, anti-haze activist Syahrul Fitra accused Zulkifli of allowing corporations to burn forests and causing the haze crisis. He claimed Zulkifli had allegedly permitted the burning of over 1.3 million hectares of forests to be used for plantations. He said law enforcers should arrest any officials responsible for the haze and called for an investigation into possible corruption in the issuance of permits. Zulkifli denied any wrongdoing.

=== Riau forestry corruption case ===
In August 2014, Zulkifli visited Riau province and encouraged proposals to change the status of forest land owned by locals so it could become part of 1,638,249 hectares allowed by the Forestry Ministry for conversion into non-forest land.

Riau governor Annas Ma'mun's administration responded by sending a proposal to Zulkifli, who gave his approval to some of the areas. Annas later revised the proposal, adding some land owned by palm oil businessman Gulat Manurung, who paid a bribe of S$156,000 and Rp 500 million. Annas later stated Zulkifli had approved and issued the conversion permit.

On 12 November 2014, Zulkifli was questioned as a witness by the Corruption Eradication Commission (KPK) in the case against Annas. Zulkifli denied approving the permit. Annas said he had been on his way to meet with Zulkifli when he was arrested by the KPK in a sting operation in September 2014.

Testifying at Annas's corruption trial in April 2015, Zulkifli admitted he had met with the director of PT Duta Palma, Surya Darmadi, to discuss a forest clearing permit. Surya was linked to the case by Gulat, who said he helped PT Duta Palma to meet with Annas to enable the company to convert 18,000 hectares of land. Gulat was in February 2015 sentenced to three years in jail. Annas was in June 2015 sentenced to six years in jail.

=== Bogor land conversion case ===
Zulkifli was questioned by the KPK on 11 November 2014 over the illegal issuance of a land conversion permit for a luxury housing project in Bogor, West Java. The project was developed by property firm PT Sentul City. Former Bogor regent Rachmat Yasin received Rp 4.5 billion in bribes from Sentul City president director Kwee Cahyadi Kumala, who is president commissioner of property company PT Bukit Jonggol Asri (BJA), the main shareholder of Sentul City. KPK in December 2014 raided the Forestry Ministry to seize evidence. Zulkifli denied any wrongdoing. The Forestry Ministry's director general for planning, Bambang Supijanto, said Zulkifli had rejected BJA's proposal to convert nearly 3,000 acres of forest area for housing projects in Bogor because it lacked some requirements.

=== Forest smallholdings and education ===
Zulkifli sought to improve the performance and image of the Forestry Ministry through two programs: one targeting the growth of agriculture through smallholdings in forest areas, and the other promoting environmental education. The first was the simplification of the application procedure for the development of smallholdings under the Community Nursery (Kebun Bibit Rakyat, KBR) scheme, introduced in 2010 and simplified in 2011. The second is the Forest Education program, which involves students visiting selected forest areas and planting trees.

=== Flurry of decrees ===
Conservation groups have alleged that after Joko Widodo had won Indonesia's presidential election in July 2014, Zulkifli realized he would not retain his cabinet position because PAN was not part of the incoming ruling coalition, so he, therefore, started issuing more ministerial decrees, right up to his final week in office, when 100 decrees were signed. Many of the decrees granted new concessions for timber and logging companies or allowed forest land to be used by oil palm plantation companies. Much of the land in question is in Papua province. Greenomics Indonesia said Zulkfli, during his tenure as minister, granted permits for 1.64 million acres of forest land to be used for farming, including for oil palm plantations. Zulkifli in March 2018 defended his action, saying Papua needed more land for sugar cultivation.

== MPR Speaker ==
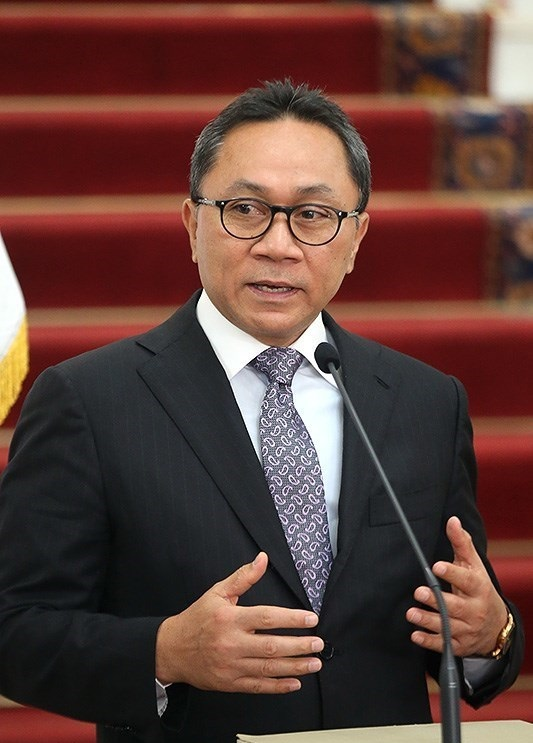
Zulkifli in parliament, December 2016

On 8 October 2014, Zulkifli was sworn in as speaker of the People's Consultative Assembly (MPR) for the 2014-2019 period. His appointment was supported by Prabowo Subianto's Red-and-White Coalition following Prabowo's loss in the 2014 presidential election to Joko "Jokowi" Widodo. Although PAN was then a member of the opposition coalition, Zulkifli promised to uphold the interests of all Indonesians and not just those of his political supporters. Jokowi's coalition had wanted Oesman Sapta Odang as MPR speaker, but Zulkifli defeated Oesman by 347 to 330 votes.

One of Zulkifli's first tasks as MPR speaker was to lead the inauguration ceremony of Indonesia's seventh president, Joko Widodo, on 20 October 2014. He was credited for ensuring the event was attended by the losing presidential candidate Prabowo Subianto, who had vigorously rejected the election result.

On 22 December 2014, Zulkifli said protests against then-Jakarta governor Basuki Tjahaja Purnama, better known as Ahok, based on his religion and race were unacceptable. Ahok, a Christian of Chinese ethnicity, faced opposition from conservative Muslim groups. "I strongly protest those who protest against Ahok because he's ethnic Chinese or because of his religion. If you want to criticize, go ahead, but do not make it about ethnicity, religion, or race, as we are united in diversity," he said.

=== Stance on alcohol and drugs ===
In May 2016, Zulkifli called for tighter regulations on the sale of alcohol, saying it has negative social consequences, including death and crimes of obscenity. Indonesia already bans the sale of alcohol to minors. In January 2018, Zulkifli claimed eight parties in the national parliament were in favor of opening alcohol sales at small shops. He said alcoholic drinks should be rejected firmly.

In February 2016, Zulkifli called for smoking to be banned as it contributes to "ignorance and poverty".

In March 2018, Zulkifli said drug traffickers should be shot dead, while drug users should be rehabilitated rather than imprisoned, as most of Indonesia's prison inmates are drug offenders.

=== Opposition to LGBT ===
In March 2016, Zulkifli said the lesbian, gay, bisexual, and transgender (LGBT) movement should have no place in Indonesia, but he warned against violence and discrimination. "As a movement, the existence of LGBT must be opposed. We must limit its room to move. However, as individual people, they must be protected like any other citizen," he said.

In January 2018, Zulkifli falsely claimed five parties in the House of Representatives were supporting a bill to legalize same-sex marriage. His statement was refuted by House speaker Bambang Soesatyo, and prompted other major parties to affirm their opposition to gay rights.

== Chairman of PAN ==
PAN held a congress in Bali from 28 February to 2 March 2015 to choose a chairman for the 2015-2020 period. Among those considered contenders were Zulkifli, then-incumbent chairman Hatta Rajasa, and deputy chairman Dradjad Wibowo.

Zulkifli announced his candidacy on 19 January 2015 in Surabaya. The Chairman of PAN's Youth Front Advisory Council, Hanafi Rais, said Zulkfli wanted the party to focus on defending the interests of the people, as well as giving local party officials full authority in determining regional leadership boards and improving the performances of regional heads.

On 1 March 2015, Zulkifli was narrowly elected PAN chairman, receiving 292 votes, while Hatta Rajasa received 286 votes. After his election, Zulkifli insisted PAN would remain part of Prabowo Subianto's opposition coalition. On 2 September 2015, Zulkifli announced PAN was switching its allegiance to Jokowi's ruling coalition to help the government's programs succeed. On 9 August 2018, Zulkifli shifted PAN's allegiance back to Prabowo amid allegations that Prabowo's running mate for the 2019 presidential election, Sandiaga Uno, had paid Rp 500 billion to PAN to secure his nomination. PAN denied the allegation.

=== Money politics ===
In February 2017, Zulkifli urged Indonesians to avoid all forms of money politics in regional elections. “The sovereignty and power are fully in the hands of the people. Do not trade it for money or staple foods,” he said. On 6 March 2018, Zulkifli was filmed giving money to women in a public transport vehicle at a market in Muara Enim in South Sumatra province, ahead of the election for the regent of Muara Enim. He was accompanied at the market by regency head candidate Syamsul Bahri, who is supported by PAN. The Election Supervisory Agency (Panwaslu) of Muara Enim conducted an investigation and attempted to summon Zulkifli for questioning but he was too busy to attend. PAN officials denied the handing out of money in the presence of the candidate constituted money politics, arguing that Syamsul Bahri's presence was his initiative. Panwaslu later concluded Zulkifli had not been trying to influence voters to choose a particular candidate.

=== Presidential ambition ===
In February 2018, Zulkifli said he would be ready to contest Indonesia's 2019 presidential election if he is nominated. He later acknowledged any presidential nominee would likely require the backing of a coalition of parties. In April 2018, he said he would be PAN's presidential candidate, despite speculation the party might choose former military commander Gatot Nurmantyo. PAN ended up supporting Prabowo Subianto for the 2019 presidential election.

=== 2020 chair fight ===
On 11 February 2020, Zulkifli was re-elected as PAN leader for another five years at a congress marred by violence. At least 10 people were injured when supporters of Zulkifli and his challenger Mulfachri Harahap threw chairs at each other.

== Personal life and family ==
Zulkifli is married to Soraya and they have four children: Futri Zulya Savitri, Zita Anjani, Farras Nugraha, and Rafi Haikal.

The oldest daughter Futri Zulya Savitri studied in Australia, married a son of Amien Rais, and runs a family business making household and kitchen appliances.

The oldest son, Farras Nugraha, studied in the UK and is now a businessman. In September 2017, Farras married Milka Anisya Norosiya. Among their wedding guests were military commander General Gatot Nurmantyo and senior politicians Oesman Sapta Odang, Amien Rais, Hidayat Nur Wahid, Aburizal Bakrie, and Akbar Tandjung.

Zulkifli's second daughter, Zita Anjani, studied in London and 2015 opened an early learning school called Kids Republic. His youngest child, Rafi Haikal, chose to study architecture in New York.

Both Zulkifli and Soraya have two grandchildren with the eldest being two years old and the youngest being one.

=== Brothers ===
Zulkifli has four brothers, including three who also became politicians: Zainudin Hasan (born 1965), Hazizi (1976), and Helmi Hasan (1979). The oldest brother in the family is Herli Hasan.

Helmi Hasan, who was elected as governor of Bengkulu in 2024 and mayor of Bengkulu City for two terms between 2013 and 2023, viewed Zulkifli not only as an older brother but also as a parent to be obeyed and respected. Zulkifli, Helmi, and Zainudin founded Insan Cendikia Kalianda Lampung Indonesia Foundation, which built a free school for children from poor families in Lampung.

In March 2015, Helmi Hasan was declared a suspect by the Bengkulu Attorney General's Office for allegedly embezzling Rp 11.4 billion ($870,000) of social aid from the city's 2012-2013 budget. Helmi filed a pre-trial motion, which was accepted on 9 September 2015 by Bengkulu City State Court, so he did not stand trial. The former head of Bengkulu City's Office for Management of Regional Revenue, Finance and Assets, M. Sofyan, in September 2017 testified Bengkulu Regional Secretary, Marjon, had ordered him to release Rp 500 million in state funds to pay for the success of Helmi's pre-trial motion.

In December 2015, Zainudin Hasan was elected regent of South Lampung Regency for the 2016-2021 period. Zainudin was arrested for corruption and money laundering in 2020, and was sentenced to 12 years in prison.

In February 2017, police in Bandar Lampung city named a Hazizi a fraud suspect for allegedly asking a contractor to pay a bribe of Rp 515 million to obtain a contract for infrastructure projects worth Rp 3.5 billion in South Lampung regency, where his brother Zainudin is regent. The contractor, Syahruddin, died in May 2016 without ever receiving the allegedly promised contract. His eldest son later reported Hazizi to police. In May 2017, Hazizi resigned from his seat in Lampung legislative assembly "for no specific reason" apart from "wanting to concentrate on worship", according to one of his colleagues in PAN.

=== Martial arts ===
Zulkifli is a practitioner of kyokushin, a type of full contact karate. He served as chairman of the Board of Supervisors of Kyokushinkan International Indonesia. In June 2010, he received an honorary black belt from the supreme leader of Kyokushin International. Zulkifli is also a practitioner of Tarung Derajat, a full body contact Indonesian mixed martial art. He was chairman of the Tarung Derajat Sports Family from 2010 to 2014.

== Honors ==
On 26 July 2007, Jakarta's PPM School of Management presented Zulkifli with the Kadarman Award, which is given to successful alumni.

On 8 July 2010, Zulkifli received a nobility title from Solo Palace in Central Java. He was bestowed the title of Kanjeng Pangeran (Prince) Noto Wononagoro for his efforts to preserve Javanese culture.

In August 2014, President Susilo Bambang Yudhoyono presented Zulkifli with the Bintang Mahaputra Adipradana for his services to the country.

On 15 November 2017, Zulkifli was awarded the title of Pangeran Kerta Jaya Alam Nata from an organization of residents of Lubuklinggau in South Sumatra. The title, which means the leader of the people who carries out the mandate, was presented to him for "consistently defending the people". Organizers said Zulkifli is the only person to receive the title.

=== National ===
- Star of the Republic of Indonesia, 3rd Class (Indonesian: Bintang Republik Indonesia Utama) (25 August 2025)
- Star of Mahaputera, 2nd Class (Indonesian: Bintang Mahaputera Adipradana) (13 August 2014)

== See also ==
- Ministry of Forestry of the Republic of Indonesia

Political offices
Preceded by Malam Sambat Kaban	Forestry minister of Indonesia; 2009–2014	Succeeded by Chairul Tanjung
Preceded by Sidarto Danusubroto	Speaker of the People's Consultative Assembly; 2014–2019	Succeeded by Bambang Soesatyo
Preceded by Muhammad Lutfi	Trade minister of Indonesia; 2022–present	Incumbent
