= Putri Zulkifli Hasan =

Indonesian politician (born 1988)

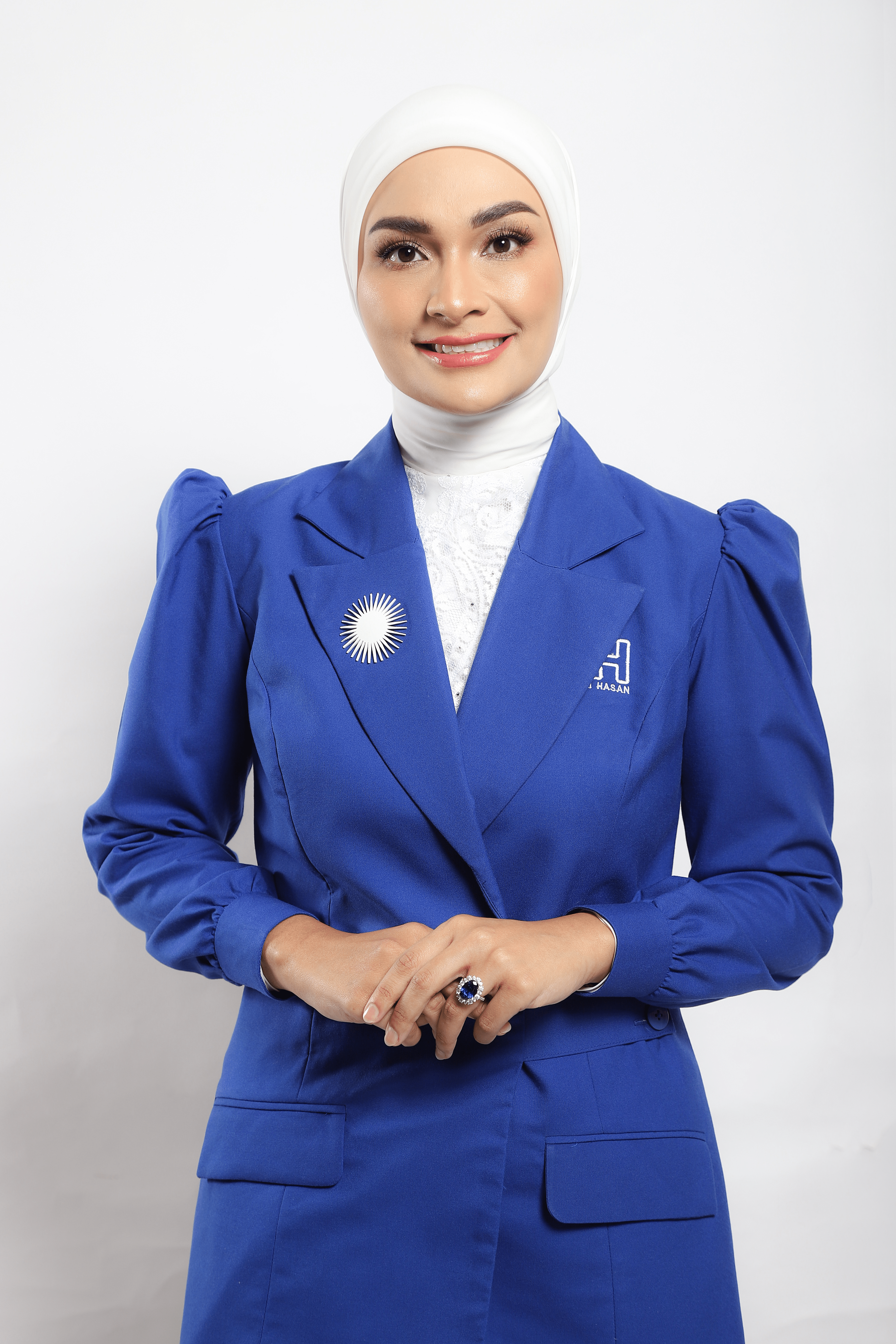

Member of the House of Representatives
- Incumbent
- Assumed office 1 October 2024
- Constituency: Lampung I

Personal details
- Born: Putri Zulkifli Hasan; 13 May 1988 (age 37) Jakarta, Indonesia
- Party: National Mandate Party
- Spouse: Zumi Zola (m. 2024)
- Parents: Zulkifli Hasan (father); Soraya Zulkifli Hasan (mother)
- Relatives: Helmi Hasan (uncle); Zita Anjani (sister)

Putri Zulkifli Hasan (born 13 May 1988) is an Indonesian politician serving as a member of the House of Representatives since 2024. She is the daughter of Zulkifli Hasan, the niece of Helmi Hasan, the sister of Zita Anjani, and the former daughter-in-law of Amien Rais.
