= Rani Mauliani =

Indonesian politician

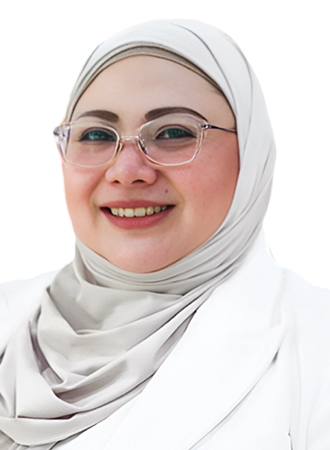
- Official portrait, 2024

Second Deputy Speaker of the Jakarta Regional House of Representatives
- Incumbent
- Assumed office 4 October 2024 Serving with 3 other people
- Speaker: Khoirudin
- Preceded by: Khoirudin

First Deputy Speaker of the Jakarta Regional House of Representatives
- In office 2 June 2022 – 26 August 2024 Serving with 3 other people
- Speaker: Prasetyo Edi Marsudi
- Preceded by: Mohamad Taufik
- Succeeded by: Ima Mahdiah
- Constituency: DKI Jakarta 9

Member of the Jakarta Regional House of Representatives
- Incumbent
- Assumed office 25 August 2009

Personal details
- Born: 10 February 1978 (age 47) Jakarta, Indonesia
- Party: Gerindra
- Spouse: Irwan Suwandi
- Relations: Sufmi Dasco Ahmad (brother-in-law)
- Children: 1
- Occupation: Politician

Rani Mauliani (born 10 February 1978) is an Indonesian politician from the Gerindra Party who is currently a member and the deputy speaker of the Jakarta Regional House of Representatives (DPRD). She was officially appointed as deputy speaker on 2 June 2022, to replace Muhammad Taufik for the remainder of the 2019–2024 term, and retained the post for the 2024–2029 term. She was first elected to the council in 2009.

She also serves as Deputy Chairperson II for Community Assistance for Kesra (Public Health), Deputy Chairperson for Women's Empowerment of PP Satria (Indonesia Raya Volunteer Unit), Deputy Chairperson of DPP KNPI, and Secretary of the DPD Gerindra Party DKI Jakarta.

She is the sister-in-law of Sufmi Dasco Ahmad, who had served as deputy speaker of the national legislature.

== Personal life ==
She is married to Irwan Suwandi, and the couple has one children.
