= Prasetyo Edi Marsudi =

Indonesian politician (born 1962)

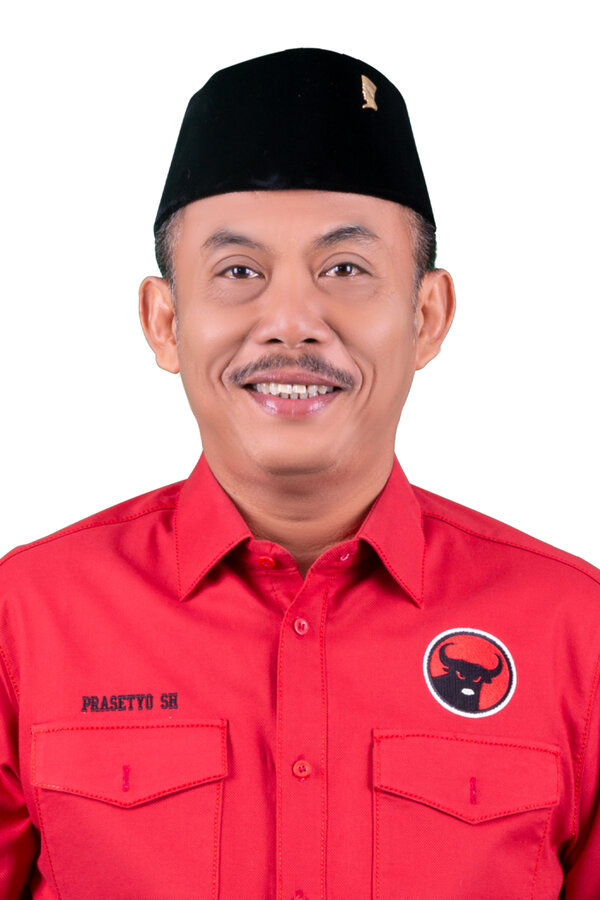
- Electoral portrait, c. 2023

16th Speaker of the Jakarta Regional House of Representatives
- In office 26 September 2014 – 26 August 2024
- Preceded by: Ferrial Sofyan
- Succeeded by: Khoirudin

Member of the Jakarta Regional House of Representatives
- In office 21 June 2013 – 24 August 2024
- Constituency: Jakarta II

Personal details
- Born: 13 May 1962 (age 63) Kudus, Central Java
- Party: PDI-P
- Spouse: Novie Muniarsari
- Children: 4

Prasetyo Edi Marsudi (born 13 May 1962) is an Indonesian politician from the Indonesian Democratic Party of Struggle (PDI-P) who was the 16th speaker of the Jakarta Regional House of Representatives (DPRD) from 2014 to 2024. He was also served as a member of the DPRD from 2013 to 2024.

First entering the DPRD in 2013 as a replacement, he was elected in the 2014 election and was appointed as speaker. Participating in the campaign team of both Joko Widodo and Basuki Tjahaja Purnama in the 2012 and 2017 gubernatorial elections, he has been investigated for allegations of bribery and fraud.

== Background ==
He was born in Kudus, Central Java on 13 May 1962. According to Prasetyo, he was a drug user in his youth.

== Career ==
Among other jobs he held before entering politics, he had worked as general manager for a cafe in Sudirman Central Business District. He was also part of Joko Widodo's successful campaign team in the 2012 gubernatorial election.

He was appointed by his party to the Jakarta DPRD on 21 June 2013, replacing other members who moved to Nasdem. In the 2014 election, he managed to gain a seat from the first electoral district. With his party PDI-P winning the most votes in the city's election, he was appointed as speaker and was voted in on 16 September 2014, officially becoming speaker on 26 September.

In 2015, he requested tighter monitoring on convenience stores selling alcohol to underage buyers. In the same year, during a budget dispute between new governor Basuki Tjahaja Purnama (or Ahok) and the city council, he got sick, according to himself due to being too involved in the issue. Ahok called him "too good-hearted", while Prasetyo asked for Ahok to communicate better with the councilors.

He was investigated in 2016 by the Corruption Eradication Commission for suspicions of involvement in a bribery scandal regarding reclamation in the Bay of Jakarta, where he was accused of acting as middlemen between the source and other councilors. Later, he led the campaign team for incumbent Basuki Tjahaja Purnama in the 2017 gubernatorial election, though Basuki lost. When Basuki was arrested for religious blasphemy, he expressed his surprise, stating that "Ahok wasn't a recidivist, he's an honest leader." Prasetyo also supported an increase in salaries for the city's councillors.

As the governor changed to Anies Baswedan, Prasetyo attacked the new governor on his handling of Tanah Abang, calling Baswedan's policy of closing the streets to allow vendors a "bad example". He also criticized then-deputy governor Sandiaga Uno's decision to sell stakes in a beer company owned by the provincial government without first bringing it up to the council.

In May 2018, he was investigated on allegations of fraud committed in 2014. He was accused by a former provincial secretary of Riau of having claimed to be able to position the secretary as acting governor of the province (when the governor was removed on corruption charges) and demanded a payment of Rp 3.25 billion, but did not deliver on his promises when paid.

Following the 2019 legislative elections, Prasetyo was reelected to the council and retained his speaker seat. He ran for a seat in the national legislature in the 2024 election in the Jakarta II district, but failed to win a seat after winning 31,478 votes.

== Personal life ==
Prasetyo is a fan of off-road racing, owning multiple jeeps since the 1980s, and in an interview stated that he trains twice a month. He is married to Novie Muniarsari and has four children.
