= Khoirudin =

Indonesian politician

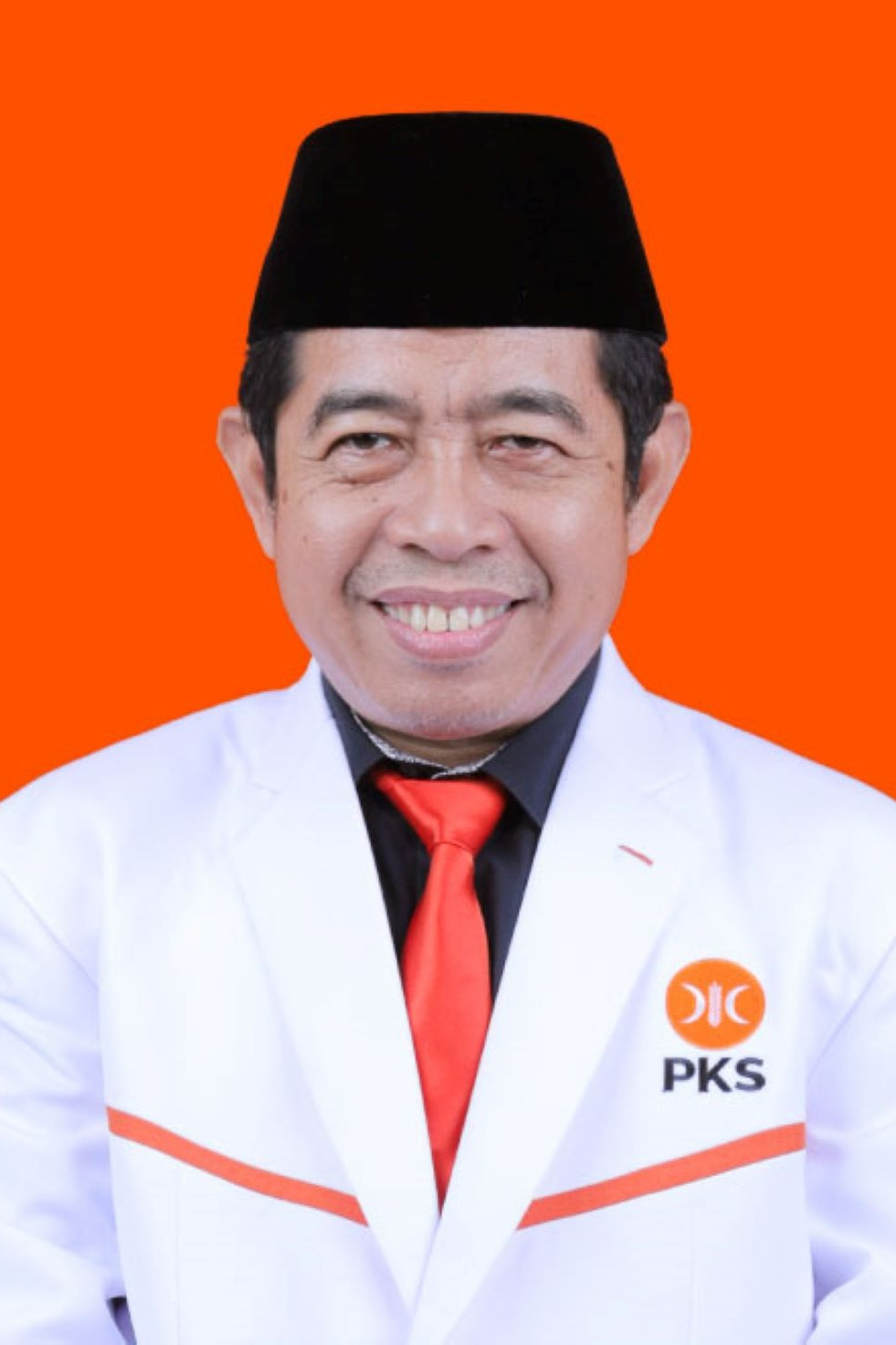
- Electoral portrait, 2024

17th Speaker of the Jakarta Regional House of Representatives
- Incumbent
- Assumed office 4 October 2024
- Governor: Heru Budi Hartono (acting); Teguh Setyabudi (acting); Pramono Anung
- Deputy: 2024–2029 Period: Ima Mahdiah; Rani Mauliani; Wibi Andrino; Basri Baco
- Preceded by: Prasetyo Edi Marsudi

Second Deputy Speaker of the Jakarta Regional House of Representatives
- In office 2 June 2022 – 26 August 2024 Serving with 3 other people
- Speaker: Prasetyo Edi Marsudi
- Preceded by: Abdurrahman Suhaimi
- Succeeded by: Rani Mauliani

Member of the Jakarta Regional House of Representatives
- Incumbent
- Assumed office 26 August 2019
- Constituency: Jakarta 7
- Majority: 16,431 (2019); 23,377 (2024)

Personal details
- Born: 8 July 1966 (age 59); Jakarta, Indonesia
- Political party: PKS

Khoirudin (born 8 July 1966) is an Indonesian politician and teacher. He is currently a member and the 17th speaker of the Jakarta Regional House of Representatives (DPRD), first being elected in 2019 as member and in 2024 as speaker. He is also a member of the Prosperous Justice Party (PKS).

== Early life ==
Khoirudin was born in Jakarta on 8 July 1966. He is of Betawi descent, with his grandfather being a Quran reading teacher. He studied in state-funded schools in Jakarta, before enrolling at the Jakarta State University in 1986. He graduated in 1992.

== Career ==
After he graduated from UNJ, Khoirudin became a teacher at a middle school in West Jakarta. He then moved to another middle school in South Jakarta, becoming the school's principal in 1999 and remaining until 2012. He also taught at an Islamic Institute in Depok. By 2006, he had become a member of the Prosperous Justice Party and was chairman of its South Jakarta branch, and in 2015 he was elected as deputy chairman of the party's Jakarta branch. In 2013, he led a demonstration against a decision by president Susilo Bambang Yudhoyono to increase the price of subsidized gasoline.

Khoirudin ran for a seat in the Jakarta Regional House of Representatives (DPRD DKI) in the 2019 election from the 7th district which covered Setiabudi, Mampang Prapatan, Kebayoran Baru, Cilandak, and Pancoran. He won 16,431 votes, and was elected as PKS' sole representative in the district. On 2 June 2022, he was appointed to replace Abdurrahman Suhaimi as a deputy speaker of the body. PKS officials cited a party policy of "refreshment" for the replacement. At that time, Khoirudin was chairman of PKS' Jakarta branch.

As a legislator (Parliamentarian), Khoirudin has called for Jakarta's provincial government to increase subsidies for education, food, and to laborers, citing the high cost of living. He was reelected from the same district in 2024, winning 23,377 votes. With PKS winning the most seats within DPRD DKI in 2024, Khoirudin was elected as the new speaker of the legislature and was sworn in on 4 October 2024.

== Electoral history ==
Election	Legislature	Constituency	Political Party	Valid Votes	Results
2019	Jakarta Regional House of Representatives	Jakarta 7	Prosperous Justice Party	16,431	Elected
2024	Jakarta Regional House of Representatives	Jakarta 7	Prosperous Justice Party	23,377	Elected
