= National Mandate Party =

Political party in Indonesia

National Mandate Party Partai Amanat Nasional
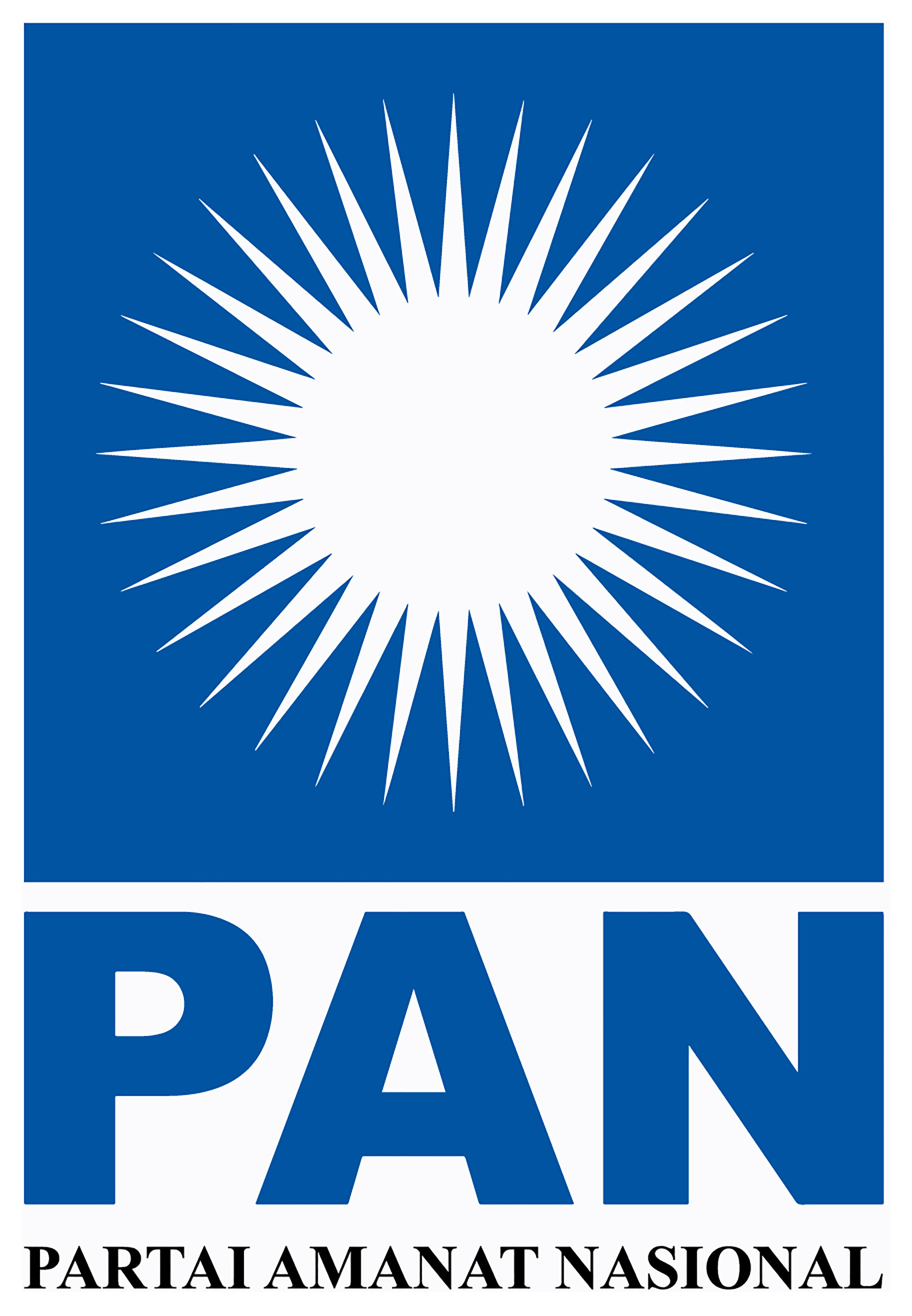
- Abbreviation: PAN
- General Chairman: Zulkifli Hasan
- Secretary-General: Eko Hendro Purnomo
- DPR group leader: Putri Zulkifli Hasan
- Founder: Amien Rais
- Founded: 23 August 1998; 28 years ago
- Headquarters: Kebayoran Baru, South Jakarta, Jakarta
- Youth wing: BM PAN (National Mandate Upholder Young Front)
- Women's wing: PUAN (National Mandate Women)
- Membership (2022): 567,415
- Ideology: Pancasila; Islamic democracy Religious nationalism Faction: Religious conservatism Historical: Federalism
- Political position: Centre to centre-right Faction: Right-wing
- National affiliation: Advanced Indonesia Coalition Former: United Indonesia Coalition; (2022–2023); Onward Indonesia Coalition; (2021–2022); Just and Prosperous Indonesia Coalition; (2018–2021); Great Indonesia Coalition; (2015–2018); Red-White Coalition; (2014–2015); Joint Secretariat; (2009–2014); People's Coalition; (2004–2009); Central Axis; (1999–2004)
- Slogan: PAN Terdepan (PAN at the Forefront)
- Anthem: Hymne PAN (PAN Hymn); Mars PAN (PAN March)
- Ballot number: 12
- DPR seats: 48 / 580
- DPRD I seats: 160 / 2,372
- DPRD II seats: 1,236 / 17,510

Website
- pan.or.id

The National Mandate Party (Indonesian: Partai Amanat Nasional), frequently abbreviated to PAN, is a non-sectarian, religion-based political party in Indonesia.

It was founded by the modernist strand of Muslim society in Indonesia, including Amien Rais, the chairman of the Muhammadiyah organization, during the Indonesian Revolution. The party contested the 2009 elections under the chairmanship of Sutrisno Bachir. It is described as a nationalist Muslim party. It also upholds the Pancasila doctrine.

In 2014, the party obtained 7.59 percent of the popular vote, which is an increase from 6.03 percent in 2009 and 6.44 percent in 2004.

== Background ==
On 14 May 1998, around 50 political figures, including Goenawan Mohammad, Faisal Basri, and Amien Rais established an organization called the Peoples Mandate Council (Indonesian: Majelis Amanat Rakyat, MARA) open to anybody who wanted to listen and express opinions. At the time, Amien Rais said that MARA would assess the performance of President Suharto's cabinet over the next six months. He also said that the people needed a strong forum that was respected by those in power and that the power structure under Suharto was not good at listening to people's opinions because it had become arrogant. At the time of the downfall of the Suharto regime in 1998, many new parties were being established and some of them wanted Amien Rais and other members of MARA to join them. One of these was the Crescent Star Party whose eventual leader Yusril Ihza Mahendra tried to persuade Amien Rais to establish a party. When he refused the offer, the party went its own way. On July 27, 1998 (the day after the declaration of the creation of the Crescent Star Party), Amien Rais announced the establishment of a new party to be called the People's Mandate Party (Indonesian: Partai Amanat Bangsa, PAB). This was changed to the current name after a lengthy voting process. The new party had its roots in the principles of religious morality, humanity, and prosperity.

== Leaders ==
No.	Name	Constituency / title	Term of office		Image	Election results
No.	Name	Constituency / title	Took office	Left office	Image	Election results
General Chair of the National Mandate Party (1998–present)
1	Amien Rais (born 1944)	Rep for DKI Jakarta	23 June 1998	9 April 2005		1998 Unopposed 2000 Amien Rais – 584; Faisal Basri – 124; Andi Mappetahang Fatwa – 77; Abstain – 1
2	Soetrisno Bachir (born 1957)	—	9 April 2005	9 January 2010		2005 Sutrisno Bachir – 741; Fuad Bawazier – 551; Muslim Abdurrahman – 148
3	Hatta Rajasa (born 1953)	Coordinating Minister for Economic Affairs	9 January 2010	1 March 2015		2010 Unopposed
4	Zulkifli Hasan (born 1962)	Rep for Lampung I (Note: Hasan was member of the House of Representatives from 1 October 2014 until 15 June 2022 before resigned from the office for new position as Minister of Trade.) Coordinating Minister for Food Affairs	1 March 2015	Incumbent		2015 Zulkifli Hasan – 292; Hatta Rajasa – 286; Abstain - 4 2020 Zulkifli Hasan – 331; Mulfachri Harahap – 225; Drajad Wibowo – 6 2024 Unopposed

== 2020 Party fracas ==
On 11 February 2020, a PAN national congress, held in Kendari, Southeast Sulawesi, was marred by violence when party members started throwing chairs at one another amid a dispute over candidates to lead the party. One PAN member suffered a broken leg during the melee. Reports said thugs had been deployed at the congress to support Mulfachri Harahap's candidacy for the party leadership. PAN leader Zulkifli was re-elected at the congress, receiving 331 votes, while Mulfachri received 225 votes.

== PAN in the legislature ==
=== Indonesian legislative election, 1999 ===
In the 1999 elections, PAN won 7.4 percent of the vote and 34 seats in the legislature. The party then played a key role in putting together a central axis of Islamic political parties in the People's Consultative Assembly which helped ensure that Abdurrahman Wahid defeated Megawati Sukarnoputri when that chamber elected the president.

However, PAN's support for Abdurrahman Wahid did not last long. Less than a year after officially confirming its support for him at its first congress in Yogyakarta in February 2000, the party withdrew this support, saying it was concerned about the condition of the nation and state of Indonesia. Not long after that, Abdurrahman Wahid was voted out of office and replaced by Megawati Sukarnoputri.

=== Indonesian legislative election, 2004 ===
For the 2004 elections, the party set a target of 15 percent of the vote. To promote his presidential candidacy, Amien Rais made a series of visits around the country. He also said that he was convinced that a retired military officer should be his vice-president. However, in the legislative election, the party won 6.4% of the popular vote and 52 out of 550 legislative seats. For the presidential election, Amien Rais stood with Siswono Yudo Husodo as his running mate but only won 15% of the vote.

=== Indonesian legislative election, 2009 ===
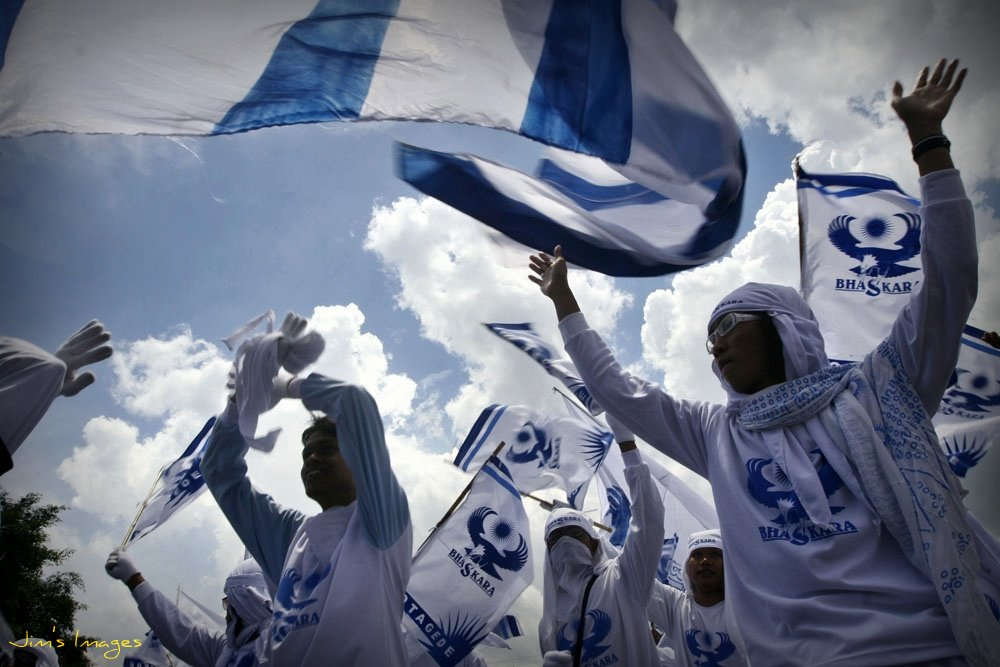
Supporters of the PAN at a campaign rally ahead of the 2009 legislative election

The party came fifth in the 2009 legislative election with 6% of the vote, gaining 43 seats in the People's Representative Council.

=== Indonesian legislative election, 2014 ===
Despite its declining influence and popularity, the party aimed to garner at least 10 percent of the vote in 2014. However, in the legislative election, PAN only won 7.49 percent of the vote. A few weeks after the legislative election, PAN announced party leader Hatta Rajasa as vice presidential candidate to run alongside Prabowo Subianto.

== Party ideology and platform ==
At the time of own establishment in 1998, the party has declared Pancasila as its ideological base. However, subsequently, as outside scholars note, due to the party's close cooperation with the Islamic organization Muhammadiyah, its support from predominantly Muslim voters and other reasons, the party's ideology became more religious and more Muslim or Islamic democratic, but far from Islamism. Nowadays, PAN is the moderate and most progressive among other Indonesian religious parties.

PAN is open to all elements of society, regardless of gender, ethnicity, or religion. According to the party website, PAN strives for the sovereignty of the people, social justice, and a better life for the people to bring about an Indonesian nation that is prosperous, developed, independent, and dignified. It also wants to realize good and clean governance that protects all the people and brings prosperity and to see a united, sovereign nation. The party wants to play a part in implementing world order based on independence, eternal peace, and social justice, and wants Indonesia to be respected in the international community.

== Election results ==
=== Legislative election results ===
Election	Ballot number	Leader	Seats		Total votes	Share of votes	Outcome of election
Election	Ballot number	Leader	No.	±	Total votes	Share of votes	Outcome of election
1999	15	Amien Rais	34 / 462		7,528,956	7.12%	Governing coalition
2004	13	Amien Rais	53 / 550	▲19	7,303,324	6.44%	Governing coalition
2009	9	Soetrisno Bachir	46 / 560	▼7	6,273,462	6.01%	Governing coalition
2014	8	Hatta Rajasa	49 / 560	▲3	9,481,621	7.59%	Opposition (2014–2015, 2018–2019)
2014	8	Hatta Rajasa	49 / 560	▲3	9,481,621	7.59%	Governing coalition (2015–2018)
2019	12	Zulkifli Hasan	44 / 575	▼5	9,572,623	6.84%	Opposition (2019–2021)
2019	12	Zulkifli Hasan	44 / 575	▼5	9,572,623	6.84%	Governing coalition (2021–2024)
2024	12	Zulkifli Hasan	48 / 580	▲4	10,984,639	7.24%	Governing coalition

=== Presidential election results ===
Election	Ballot number	Candidate	Running mate	1st round (Total votes)	Share of votes	Outcome	2nd round (Total votes)	Share of votes	Outcome
2004	3	**Amien Rais**	Siswono Yudo Husodo	17,392,931	14.66%	Eliminated	Runoff		
2009	2	Susilo Bambang Yudhoyono	Boediono	73,874,562	60.80%	Elected			
2014	1	Prabowo Subianto	**Hatta Rajasa**	62,576,444	46.85%	Lost			
2019	2	Prabowo Subianto	Sandiaga Uno	68,650,239	44.50%	Lost			
2024	2	Prabowo Subianto	Gibran Rakabuming Raka	96,214,691	58.59%	Elected			

Note: Bold text indicates the party member

== Bibliography ==
- Ananta, Aris; Arifin, Evi Nurvidya; Suryadinata, Leo (2005). Emerging Democracy in Indonesia. Singapore: Institute of Southeast Asian Studies. ISBN 981-230-323-5.
- Dhakidae, Daniel (ed.), (2004) Partai-Partai Politik Indonesia: Ideologi dan Program 2004-2009 [Indonesian Political Parties: Ideologies and Programs 2004-2009] (in Indonesian). Kompas (1999) ISBN 979-709-121-X
- Evans, Kevin Raymond, (2003) The History of Political Parties & General Elections in Indonesia, Arise Consultancies, Jakarta, ISBN 979-97445-0-4
- King, Blair A. (2011). "Chapter 4. Government and Politics". In Frederick, William H.; Worden, Robert L. (eds.). Indonesia: A Country Study. Area handbook series, 39. Library of Congress, Federal Research Division (6th ed.). Washington, DC: U.S. Government Printing Office. pp. 225–306. ISBN 978-0-8444-0790-6.
- Musa Kazhim & Alfian Hamzah (1999) 5 Partai Dalam timbangan (5 Parties in Consideration), Putaka Hidaya, Bandung ISBN 979-9109-17-5 Indonesian

== See also ==
- List of Islamic political parties
