= Jakarta Regional House of Representatives =

Unicameral legislature of the Indonesian province of Jakarta

Special Capital Region of Jakarta Province Regional House of Representatives Dewan Perwakilan Rakyat Daerah Provinsi Daerah Khusus Ibukota Jakarta
- 2024–2029 Period
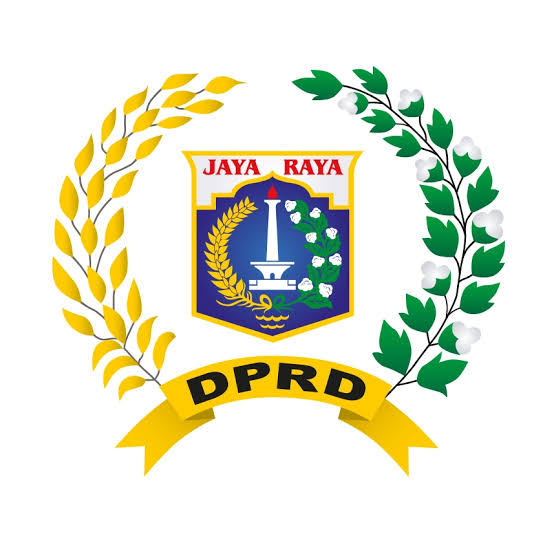

Type
- Type: Unicameral

History
- Established: 16 March 1950; 76 years ago (as Provisional Jakarta City Regional House of Representatives); 17 July 1957; 69 years ago (as Jakarta City Regional House of Representatives); 1961; 65 years ago (current status as special capital region)
- Preceded by: Gemeenten Batavia
- New session started: 26 August 2024

Leadership
- Speaker: Suhud Alynudin, PKS since 8 June 2026
- Deputy Speaker: Ima Mahdiah, PDI-P since 4 October 2024
- Deputy Speaker: Rani Mauliani, Gerindra since 2 June 2022
- Deputy Speaker: Wibi Andrino, NasDem since 4 October 2024
- Deputy Speaker: Basri Baco, Golkar since 4 October 2024

Structure
- Seats: 106
- Political groups: Government (15): PDI-P (15); Supported by (82): PKS (18); Gerindra (14); NasDem (11); Golkar (10); PKB (10); PAN (10); Democratic (8); Perindo (1); Opposition (8): PSI (8); Neutral (1): PPP (1)
- Length of term: 5 years

Elections
- Voting system: Open list proportional representation
- First election: 22 June 1957
- Last general election: 14 February 2024
- Next general election: 2031

Meeting place
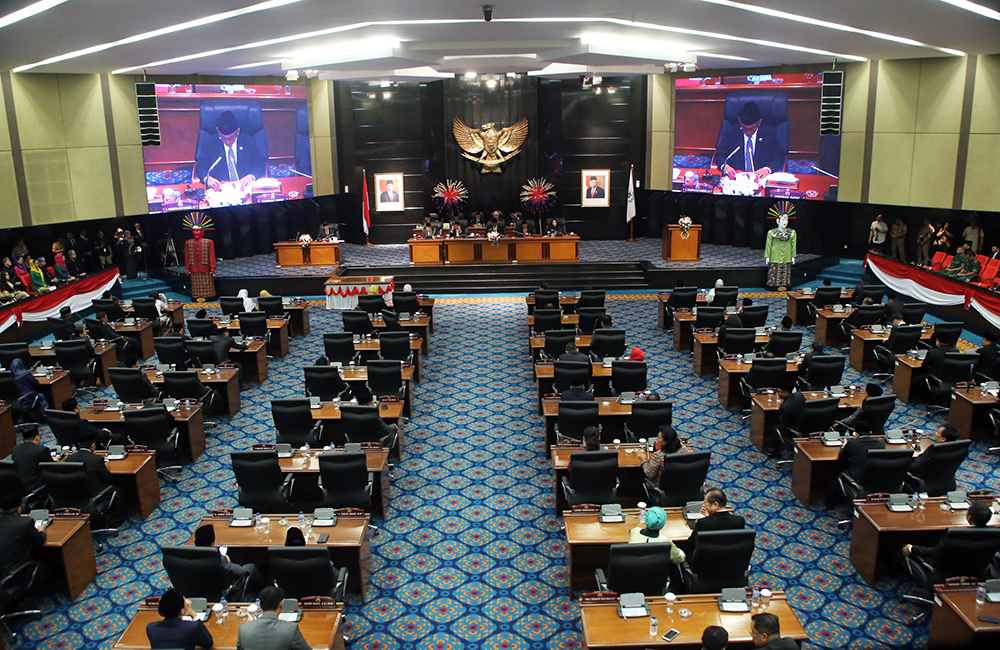
- DPRD Chamber - Jakarta Provincial DPRD Building; Jalan Kebon Sirih No. 18; Postal code 10110; Gambir, Central Jakarta, Jakarta, Indonesia

Website
- dprd-dkijakartaprov.go.id

The Jakarta Regional House of Representatives (Indonesian: Dewan Perwakilan Rakyat Daerah Provinsi Daerah Khusus Ibukota Jakarta, abbreviated to DPRD Jakarta) is the unicameral legislature of the Indonesian province of Jakarta. It is composed of 106 members who are elected through general elections once every five years, simultaneously with the national legislative election. Unlike other regional provincial legislatures in Indonesia, the number of members of the Jakarta Provincial DPRD is a maximum of 125% (one hundred and twenty five percent) of the maximum number for the category of the population of Jakarta as determined by law.

The new 2024-2029 period of the legislature was officially opened with an inauguration on the 26 August 2024.

It convenes in the Jakarta Provincial DPRD Building, Central Jakarta.

== History ==
Under the Dutch East India Company's administration, a "College of Alderman" (Dutch: College van Schepenen) for Batavia was established on 24 July 1620. There was also the College van Heemraden (polder board). In 1905, a municipal body known as the Gemeenten Batavia was established, which was renamed to Stadsgemeente Batavia in 1926. During the Japanese occupation, an advisory body was formed in September 1943.

Following Indonesian independence, a local representative body was established by the new Indonesian government, though it was dissolved shortly afterwards due to Dutch reoccupation of the city. After the transfer of sovereignty, a temporary elected house of 25 members was established in 1950. It was intended as a temporary body but ended up lasting until 1956, when new regulations on local legislation were issued.

== Role and function ==
The Jakarta Provincial DPRD has legislative, budgetary and supervisory functions. In addition, the DPRD of DK Jakarta Province also provides considerations for mayoral/regent candidates proposed by the Governor.

=== Powers ===
DPRD powers are classified under Law No. 17 of 2014 as legislative, budgeting, and supervisory powers, which includes creating regional laws, approving budgets proposed by the regional heads (governos/mayors/regents), and monitoring the spending of funds. Additionally, DPRD could propose the removal of a regional head the Ministry of Home Affairs, and may declare impeachment of a regional head. However, DPRD cannot remove regional heads from their positions, which remained the authority of the Supreme Court of Indonesia.

== General election results ==
=== 2024 Indonesian legislative election ===
The valid vote acquisition of political parties participating in the 2024 legislative election from each electoral districts (constituency) for members of the Jakarta Provincial DPRD is as follows.

Results of the 2024 legislative election

Electoral District (Constituency)	PKB	Gerindra	PDI-P	Golkar	NasDem	Labour	Gelora	PKS	PKN	Hanura	Garuda	PAN	PBB	Democratic	PSI	Perindo	PPP	Ummat	Valid Votes
DKI Jakarta 1	30,786	79,666	80,361	43,839	53,958	6,052	6,059	105,976	3,067	3,671	1,609	35,947	2,560	34,715	52,516	17,366	12,256	7,244	577,648
DKI Jakarta 2	22,807	70,109	75,709	80,852	72,819	3,532	4,794	54,617	1,454	2,809	821	34,267	2,101	24,999	23,076	12,093	5,875	4,318	497,052
DKI Jakarta 3	70,949	58,495	87,581	22,204	37,122	3,540	5,071	36,081	3,342	1,331	646	50,895	560	22,389	46,388	9,369	3,232	2,487	461,682
DKI Jakarta 4	57,164	56,736	68,434	30,862	39,224	8,924	8,541	105,629	1,726	3,811	1,992	44,842	1,467	80,699	34,781	15,248	20,644	5,119	585,843
DKI Jakarta 5	46,385	58,411	73,113	63,455	46,936	9,755	4,281	130,561	3,080	3,294	969	45,654	1,792	39,572	41,428	7,353	23,806	7,850	607,695
DKI Jakarta 6	43,293	86,275	70,437	51,840	34,797	10,020	5,004	125,453	801	2,695	926	32,229	1,120	42,568	31,810	12,142	41,092	4,304	596,806
DKI Jakarta 7	58,190	67,365	64,670	78,780	70,180	8,299	5,236	100,308	955	2,215	1,179	36,955	1,211	36,216	46,237	21,632	14,583	5,123	619,334
DKI Jakarta 8	76,157	83,546	76,063	46,361	42,721	9,755	6,280	170,053	1,531	3,228	1,817	53,358	2,701	57,665	43,754	23,065	16,035	12,447	726,537
DKI Jakarta 9	34,592	77,741	107,269	58,624	74,092	4,575	6,055	72,449	2,187	1,662	1,717	74,927	808	68,883	76,874	26,552	7,778	3,551	700,336
DKI Jakarta 10	30,482	89,940	146,559	40,988	71,105	5,528	11,530	110,917	1,061	1,823	1,150	46,834	1,431	36,614	69,072	15,383	7,940	3,831	692,188
Total Votes	470,805	728,284	850,196	517,805	542,954	69,980	62,851	1,012,044	19,204	26,539	12,826	455,908	15,751	444,320	465,936	160,203	153,241	56,274	6,065,121
Source: General Elections Commission of the Republic of Indonesia

== Composition ==
The following is the composition of the members of the Jakarta DPRD from 1971 to present.

Political Parties	Number of Seats in Period											
Political Parties	1954–1956	1956–1957	1957–1960	1971–1977	1977–1982	1982–1987	1997–1999	2004–2009	2009–2014	2014–2019	2019–2024	2024–2029
PKS								18	18	▼11	▲16	▲18
PDI-P								11	11	▲28	▼25	▼15
Gerindra									6	▲15	▲19	▼14
NasDem										5	▲7	▲11
Golkar				17	▲13	▲16	39	7	7	▲9	▼6	▲10
PKB								4	▼1	▲6	▼5	▲10
PAN								6	▼4	▼2	▲9	▲10
PSI											8	8
Democratic								16	16	▲32	▼10	▼8
Perindo											0	▲1
PPP				11	▲14	▼12	20	7	7	▲10	▼1	1
Hanura									4	▲10	▼0	0
PDS								4	4			
PBR								2	▼0			
PDI				6	6	▼5	1					
PNI	5	▲9	▼8									
Masyumi		▲11	▼9									
PKI	3	▲6	▲8									
NU	3	▲7	▼6									
Baperki		2	2									
PSII	3	▼1	1									
Parkindo	1	1	1									
PSI		2	▼1									
Labour	2	▼1	1									
Catholic	1	1	1									
IPKI		1	▼0									
Perti	1	▼0	▼0									
Parindra	3	0	0									
PIR	3	0	0									
PRN	3	0	0									
BTI	2	▼0	▼0									
PRI	1	▼0	▼0									
Permai	1	▼0	▼0									
SKI	1	▼0										
Parki	1	▼0	▼0									
GPS			1									
PPPRI		1	1									
Murba		1	▼0									
Perwari			1									
PWR	1	▼0										
ABRI				6	▲7	▼6	15					
Number of Members	35	▲44	▼41	40	40	▼39	75	75	▲94	▲106	106	106
Number of Factions	17	▼13	13	4	4	4	4	9	▲10	10	10	▲11

== Parliamentary groups ==
=== Factions ===
A faction is a forum for DPRD members to gather in order to optimize the implementation of the functions, duties, and authorities as well as the rights and obligations of the DPRD. Each faction has at least the same number of members as the number of commissions in the DPRD. One faction in the DKI Jakarta Provincial DPRD has at least 5 members. The Jakarta Provincial DPRD for the 2024-2029 period consists of 9 factions as follows:

Faction	Member Parties	Chairman	Number of Members
Prosperous Justice Party Faction	PKS	Ismail	18
Indonesian Democratic Party of Struggle Faction	PDI-P	Pantas Nainggolan	15
Gerindra Party Faction	Gerindra	Setyoko	14
NasDem-PPP Faction	NasDem; PPP	Jupiter	11
Golkar Party Faction	Golkar	Judistira Hermawan	10
National Awakening Party Faction	PKB	M. Fu'adi Luthfi	11
National Mandate Party Faction	PAN	Husen	10
Democratic-Perindo Faction	Democratic; Perindo	Desie Christhyana Sari	9
Indonesian Solidarity Party Faction	PSI	William Aditya Sarana	8

== Structure ==
Based on Article 110 Law of the Republic of Indonesia Number 23 of 2014 concerning Regional Government, the Provincial DPRD (AKD) Equipment consists of:

1. Leadership
2. Deliberative Body (Bamus)
3. Commission
4. Regional Regulation Formation Body (Bapemperda)
5. Budget Agency (Banggar)
6. Honorary Council (BK)
7. Other Equipment (formed through a Plenary Meeting)

=== Leadership ===
According to the laws and regulations, the Provincial DPRD which has members: 35-44 people led by 1 speaker and 2 deputy speakers; 45-84 people led by 1 speaker and 3 deputy speakers; and 85-100 people led by 1 speaker and 4 deputy speaker. The leadership of the Jakarta DPRD consists of 1 Speaker and 4 Deputy Sepeker who come from the political parties that won the first, second, and third most seats (and votes), respectively.

=== Commissions ===
According to the provisions of the law, the Provincial DPRD with 35-55 members can form 4 commissions and the Provincial DPRD with more than 55 members can form 5 commissions. The DKI Jakarta Provincial DPRD consists of 5 commissions as follows:

- Commission A Government Sector
- Commission B Economic Sector
- Commission C Finance Sector
- Commission D Development Sector
- Commission E Public Welfare Sector

The following is a list of the leaders of the Jakarta DPRD Commissions for the 2024-2029 Period:

Name of Commission	Name of Chairperson	Name of Deputy Chairperson	Name of Secretary	Number of Members	Information
Commission A Field Government	Inggard Joshua (Gerindra)	Alia Noorayu Laksono (Golkar)	Mujiyono (Democratic)	17	
Commission B Economic Affairs	Nova Harian Paloh (NasDem)	Wahyu Dewanto (Gerindra)	Muhammad Lefy (PKB)	18	
Commission C Financial Sector	Dimaz Raditya Soesatyo (Golkar)	Sutikno (PKB)	Suhud Alynudin (PKS)	13	
Commission D Development Sector	Yuke Yurike (PDI-P)	Muhammad Idris (NasDem)	Habib Muhammad Bin Salim Alatas (PAN)	15	
Commission E People's Welfare Sector	Muhammad Thamrin (PKS)	Agustina Hermanto (PDI-P)	Justin Adrian Untayana (PSI)	19	

=== Agencies ===
The agencies in the DKI Jakarta DPRD consist of the Budget Agency, the Consultative Body, the Regional Regulation Formation Agency and the Honorary Council. The Consultative Body and Budget Agency are led by ex-officio DPRD leaders. The following are the names of the Heads of the Agencies.

Agency Name	Chairman's Name	Deputy Chairperson's Name	Description
Deliberative Body	Ex-officio Chairperson	Ex-officio Deputy Chairperson	
Budget Agency	Ex-officio Chairperson	Ex-officio Deputy Chairperson	
Regional Regulation Formation Agency	Abdul Aziz (PKS)	Jhonny Simanjuntak (PDI-P)	
Honorary Council	Yudha Permana (Gerindra)	Bambang Kusumanto (PAN)	

== Electoral districts ==
In the 2019 legislative election and 2024 legislative election, The election for the Jakarta Provincial DPRD is divided into 7 electoral districts known as dapil (constituency) as follows:

Constituency Name	Constituency Region	Number of Seats
DKI JAKARTA 1	Central Jakarta	12
DKI JAKARTA 2	Thousand Islands Regency; North Jakarta A (Koja, Cilincing, Kelapa Gading)	9
DKI JAKARTA 3	North Jakarta B (Penjaringan, Pademangan, Tanjung Priok)	9
DKI JAKARTA 4	East Jakarta A (Cakung, Pulo Gadung, Matraman)	10
DKI JAKARTA 5	East Jakarta B (Duren Sawit, Jatinegara, Kramat Jati)	10
JAKARTA 6	East Jakarta C (Makasar, Cipayung, Ciracas, Pasar Rebo)	10
DKI JAKARTA 7	South Jakarta A (Setiabudi, Kebayoran Baru, Cilandak, Kebayoran Lama, Pesanggrahan)	10
DKI JAKARTA 8	South Jakarta B (Tebet, Pancoran, Mampang Prapatan, Pasar Minggu, Jagakarsa)	12
DKI JAKARTA 9	West Jakarta A (Tambora, Cengkareng, Kalideres)	12
DKI JAKARTA 10	West Jakarta B (Taman Sari, Grogol Petamburan, Palmerah, Kebon Jeruk, Kembangan)	12
TOTAL		106

== List of members ==
=== Current members ===
==== 2024–2029 Period ====
Member Name	Political Party	Electoral District (Constituency)	Valid Votes	Faction	Commission	Agency	Remarks	Ref.
Muhammad Hasan Abdillah	PKS	DKI Jakarta 1	19,363	PKS; Member	A Member			
H. Ismail	PKS	DKI Jakarta 1	14,480	PKS; Chairman	B Member			
Suhud Alynudin	PKS	DKI Jakarta 2	12,336	PKS; Member	C Secretary			
H. M. Subki	PKS	DKI Jakarta 3	12,378	PKS; Deputy Chairperson II	E Member			
H. M. Taufik Zoelkifli	PKS	DKI Jakarta 4	28,531	PKS; Secretary	B Member			
H. Ghozi Zulazmi	PKS	DKI Jakarta 4	13,329	PKS; Member	D Member			
H. Abdurrahman Suhaimi	PKS	DKI Jakarta 5	19,721	PKS; Advisor	D Member			
H. Nasdiyanto	PKS	DKI Jakarta 5	19,596	PKS; Treasurer	C Member			
K.H. Muhammad Thamrin	PKS	DKI Jakarta 6	36,274	PKS; Deputy Chairman I	E Chairman			
Muhammad Alfatih	PKS	DKI Jakarta 6	12,844	PKS; Member	B Member			
H. Khoirudin	PKS	DKI Jakarta 7	23,377	PKS; Advisor	C Commission Coordinator	Speaker of DPRD; Chairman of Bamus; Chairman of Banggar	DPRD Speaker	
Hj. Zahrina Nurbaeti	PKS	DKI Jakarta 7	14,197	PKS; Deputy Treasurer I	A Member			
Hj. Nabilah Aboe Bakar Alhabsyi	PKS	DKI Jakarta 8	26,344	PKS; Deputy Treasurer II	D Member			
H. Achmad Yani	PKS	DKI Jakarta 8	18,885	PKS; Advisor	A Member		Temporary Chairman of the DPRD (August - September 2024)	
H. Ade Suherman	PKS	DKI Jakarta 8	16,490	PKS; Member	B Member	|		
Hj. Sholikhah	PKS	DKI Jakarta 9	18,958	PKS; Member	E Member			
H. Abdul Aziz	PKS	DKI Jakarta 10	22,006	PKS; Advisor	E Member	Head of Bapemperda		
Hj. Inad Luciawaty	PKS	DKI Jakarta 10	12,331	PKS; Member	A Member			
Wa Ode Herlina	PDI-P	DKI Jakarta 1	14,013	PDI Perjuangan; Member	B Member			
Pandapotan Sinaga	PDI-P	DKI Jakarta 1	9,212	PDI Perjuangan; Deputy Chairperson	B Member			
Agustina Hermanto (Tina Toon)	PDI-P	DKI Jakarta 2	36,156	PDI Perjuangan; Member	E Deputy Chairperson			
Jhonny Simanjuntak	PDI-P	DKI Jakarta 2	10,845	PDI Perjuangan; Advisor	E Member	Deputy Chairperson of Bapemperda	Temporary Deputy Speaker of DPRD (August - September 2024)	
Hj. Ida Mahmudah	PDI-P	DKI Jakarta 3	11,780	PDI Perjuangan; Member	D Member			
Brando Susanto	PDI-P	DKI Jakarta 3	11,506	PDI Perjuangan; Deputy Secretary	C Member		Died while in office.	
Dwi Rio Sambodo	PDI-P	DKI Jakarta 4	14,645	PDI Perjuangan; Secretary	B Member			
Pantas Nainggolan	PDI-P	DKI Jakarta 5	13,214	PDI Perjuangan; Chairman	D Member			
Manuara Siahaan	PDI-P	DKI Jakarta 6	9,037	PDI Perjuangan; Member	A Member			
Chicha Koeswoyo	PDI-P	DKI Jakarta 7	15,578	PDI Perjuangan; Treasurer	E Member			
Hj. Yuke Yurike	PDI-P	DKI Jakarta 8	12,302	PDI Perjuangan; Members	D Chairman			
Lauw Siegvrieda	PDI-P	DKI Jakarta 9	21,019	PDI Perjuangan; Members	A Members			
Hilda Kusuma Dewi	PDI-P	DKI Jakarta 9	11,420	PDI Perjuangan; Member	A Member			
Ima Mahdiah	PDI-P	DKI Jakarta 10	28,479	PDI Perjuangan; Member	A Commission Coordinator	Deputy Chairman I of DPRD; Deputy Chairman I of Bamus; Deputy Chairman I of Banggar	Deputy Speaker of DPRD	
Hardiyanto Kenneth	PDI-P	DKI Jakarta 10	26,168	PDI Perjuangan; Member	C Member			
H. Nuchbatillah	Gerindra	DKI Jakarta 1	19,543	Gerindra; Deputy Chairperson	A Member			
Dian Pratama	Gerindra	DKI Jakarta 1	15,236	Gerindra; Treasurer	E Member			
Anggi Arando Siregar	Gerindra	DKI Jakarta 2	13,775	Gerindra; Member	E Member			
Alief Bintang Haryadi	Gerindra	DKI Jakarta 3	11,364	Gerindra; Member	C Member			
Adnan Taufiq	Gerindra	DKI Jakarta 4	16,603	Gerindra; Advisor	C Member			
Ali Hakim Lubis	Gerindra	DKI Jakarta 5	9,619	Gerindra; Member	D Member			
Ryan Kurnia Ar Rahman	Gerindra	DKI Jakarta 6	19,956	Gerindra; Deputy Secretary	B Member			
Setyoko	Gerindra	DKI Jakarta 7	20,527	Gerindra; Chairman	D Member			
H. Wahyu Dewanto	Gerindra	DKI Jakarta 8	14,831	Gerindra; Advisor	B Deputy Chairman			
Nurhasan	Gerindra	DKI Jakarta 8	11,631	Gerindra; Advisor	B Member			
Inggard Joshua	Gerindra	DKI Jakarta 9	29,295	Gerindra; Advisor	A Chairman			
Hj. Rani Mauliani	Gerindra	DKI Jakarta 9	11,152	Gerindra; Advisor	E Commission Coordinator	Deputy Speaker of DPRD; Deputy Chairperson II of Bamus; Deputy Chairperson II of Banggar	Deputy Speaker of DPRD	
Yudha Permana	Gerindra	DKI Jakarta 10	20,107	Gerindra; Secretary	E Member	Head of BK DPRD		
Jamilah Abdul Ghani	Gerindra	DKI Jakarta 10	16,664	Gerindra; Deputy Treasurer	D Member			
Riano P. Ahmad	NasDem	DKI Jakarta 1	8,878	NasDem; Member	A Member			
H. Muhammad Idris	NasDem	DKI Jakarta 2	17,263	NasDem; Member	D Deputy Chairperson			
H. Imamuddin	NasDem	DKI Jakarta 3	12,815	NasDem; Secretary	E Member			
Muhammad Ongen Sangaji	NasDem	DKI Jakarta 4	12,533	NasDem; Advisor	A Member			
Fatimah Tania Nadira Alatas	NasDem	DKI Jakarta 5	8,481	NasDem; Member	E Member			
Raden Gusti Arief Yulifard	NasDem	DKI Jakarta 6	5,300	NasDem; Treasurer	E Member			
Wibi Andrino	NasDem	DKI Jakarta 7	23,925	NasDem; Advisor	D Commission Coordinator	Deputy Speaker of DPRD; Deputy Chairperson III of Bamus; Deputy Chairperson III of Banggar	Deputy Speaker of DPRD	
Nova Harivan Paloh	NasDem	DKI Jakarta 8	15,441	NasDem; Deputy Speaker	B Chairman			
Gias Kumari Putra	NasDem	DKI Jakarta 9	19,525	NasDem; Member	C Member			
Jupiter	NasDem	DKI Jakarta 10	25,765	NasDem; Chairman	B Member			
Basri Baco	NasDem	DKI Jakarta 1	21,823	Golkar; Advisor	B Commission Coordinator	Deputy Speaker of DPRD; Deputy Chairman IV of Bamus; Deputy Chairman IV of Banggar	Deputy Speaker of DPRD	
Dimaz Raditya	Golkar	DKI Jakarta 2	27,693	Golkar; Member	C Chairman			
Ramly H I Muhamad	Golkar	DKI Jakarta 2	23,320	Golkar; Deputy Chairman I	E Member			
Judistira Hermawan	Golkar	DKI Jakarta 4	13,919	Golkar; Chairman	D Member			
Alia Noorayu Laksono	Golkar	DKI Jakarta 5	12,381	Golkar; Member	A Vice Chairman			
Sardy Wahab Sadri	Golkar	DKI Jakarta 6	12,803	Golkar; Vice Chairman II	D Member			
Dadiyono	Golkar	DKI Jakarta 7	21,619	Golkar; Treasurer	A Member			
Farah Savira	Golkar	DKI Jakarta 8	8,998	Golkar; Member	E Member			
Andri Santosa	Golkar	DKI Jakarta 9	11,615	Golkar; Secretary	B Member			
Syafi Fabio Djohan	Golkar	DKI Jakarta 10	12,060	Golkar; Member	C Member			
Heri Kustanto	PKB	DKI Jakarta 1	5,402	PKB; Member	A Member			
Hengky Wijaya	PKB	DKI Jakarta 3	17,768	PKB; Deputy Treasurer	B Member			
H. Tri Waluyo	PKB	DKI Jakarta 3	17,590	PKB; Member	C Member			
Muhammad Lefy	PKB	DKI Jakarta 4	19,159	PKB; Deputy Secretary	B Secretary			
M. Fu'adi Luthfi	PKB	DKI Jakarta 5	14,309	PKB; Chairman	A Member			
H. Ahmad Moetaba	PKB	DKI Jakarta 6	15,121	PKB; Deputy Chairman	B Member			
H. Sutikno	PKB	DKI Jakarta 7	34,403	PKB; Advisor	C Deputy Chairman			
Yusuf	PKB	DKI Jakarta 8	22,718	PKB; Secretary	E Member			
H. Ahmad Ruslan	PKB	DKI Jakarta 9	13,762	PKB; Treasurer	D Member			
Uwais El Qoroni	PKB	DKI Jakarta 10	6,549	PKB; Member	E Member			
Alwi Moehamad Ali	PAN	DKI Jakarta 1	9,293	PAN; Member	D Member			
Oman Rohman Rakinda	PAN	DKI Jakarta 2	17,050	PAN; Secretary	E Member			
Bebizie Sri Mulyati	PAN	DKI Jakarta 3	15,521	PAN; Member	B Member			
Syahroni	PAN	DKI Jakarta 4	16,230	PAN; Treasurer	B Member			
Hj. Zita Anjani	PAN	DKI Jakarta 5	18,544	PAN; Advisor	C Member			
H. Bambang Kusumanto	PAN	DKI Jakarta 6	9,593	PAN; Member	A Member	Deputy Chairperson of DPRD BK		
Astrid Khairunisha	PAN	DKI Jakarta 7	13,409	PAN; Member	E Member			
Habib Muhammad Bin Salim Alatas	PAN	DKI Jakarta 8	17,322	PAN; Member	D Secretary			
H. Lukmanul Hakim	Democratic	DKI Jakarta 9	23,023	PAN; Member	C Member			
Husen	PAN	DKI Jakarta 10	11,694	PAN; Chairman	D Member			
Desie Christhyana Sari	Democratic	DKI Jakarta 1	13,279	Democrats; Deputy Chairperson	E Member			
Hj. Neneng Hasanah	Democratic	DKI Jakarta 2	11,387	Democrats; Members	D Members			
Faisal	Democratic	DKI Jakarta 3	5,134	Democrats; Members	A Members			
H. Ferrial Sofyan	Democratic	DKI Jakarta 4	12,619	Democrats; Advisor	D Member			
Mujiyono	Democratic	DKI Jakarta 5	6,826	Democrats; Member	A Chairman			
H. Misan Samsuri	Democratic	DKI Jakarta 6	16,573	Democrats; Advisor		Deputy Speaker of DPRD; Deputy Chairman III of Bamus; Deputy Chairman III of Banggar	Deputy Speaker of DPRD	
H. Ali Muhammad Johan C.	Democratic	DKI Jakarta 7	8,136	Democrats; Secretary	E Member			
H. Achmad Nawawi	Democratic	DKI Jakarta 8	9,964	Democrats; Deputy Chairperson	E Member			
Nur Afni Sajim	Democratic	DKI Jakarta 9	13,131	Democrats; Member	B Member			
Wita Susilowaty	Democratic	DKI Jakarta 10	14.125	Democrat; Treasurer	B Member			
Riano P. Ahmad (2019-2022)	PAN	DKI Jakarta 1	5,511	PAN; Member	D Member		Resigned because he has become a member of another party.	
H. Wawan Suhawan (2022–present)	PAN	DKI Jakarta 1	3.809	PAN; Member	B Member		PAW in the name of Riano P. Ahmad.	
Oman Rohman Rakinda	PAN	DKI Jakarta 2	8,694	PAN; Secretary	E Member			
Syahroni	PAN	DKI Jakarta 4	5,466	PAN; Member	D Member			
Hj. Zita Anjani	PAN	DKI Jakarta 5	14,701	PAN; Advisor		Deputy Speaker of DPRD; Deputy Chairman IV of Bamus; Deputy Chairman IV of Banggar	Deputy Speaker of DPRD	
H. Bambang Kusumanto	PAN	DKI Jakarta 6	9,707	PAN; Deputy Chairman	C Member			
Farazandi Fidinansyah	PAN	DKI Jakarta 7	6,787	PAN; Treasurer	B Member			
Habib Muhammad Bin Salim Alatas	PAN	DKI Jakarta 8	15,176	PAN; Member	C Chairman			
H. Lukmanul Hakim	PAN	DKI Jakarta 9	14,155	PAN; Chairman	A Member			
Guruh Tirta Lunggana (2019-2022)	PAN	DKI Jakarta 10	8,278	PAN; Member	B Member		Resigned due to becoming a member of another party.	
Husen (2022–present)	PAN	DKI Jakarta 10	6,335	PAN; Member	D Member		PAW on behalf of Guruh Tirta Lunggana.	
Idris Ahmad (2019–2023)	PSI	DKI Jakarta 1	5,363	PSI; Chairman	E Member		Resigned because he has become a member of another party.	
Anthony Winza Probowo	PSI	DKI Jakarta 2	6,808	PSI; Secretary	C Member			
Viani Limardi	PSI	DKI Jakarta 3	8,700	PSI; Member	D Member			
Justin Adrian	PSI	DKI Jakarta 5	5,325	PSI; Deputy Chairperson	D Member			
Anggara Wicitra Sastroamidjojo (2019–2023)	PSI	DKI Jakarta 7	9,027	PSI; Member	E Deputy Chairperson		Resigned due to becoming a member of another party.	
August Hamonangan	PSI	DKI Jakarta 8	4,988	PSI; Member	A Member			
William Aditya Sarana	PSI	DKI Jakarta 9	12,295	PSI; Member	A Member			
Eneng Malianasari	PSI	DKI Jakarta 10	4,645	PSI; Member	B Member			
M. Hariadi Anwar	NasDem	DKI Jakarta 1	9,459	NasDem; Advisor	E Member			
H. Muhammad Idris	NasDem	DKI Jakarta 2	9,620	NasDem; Member	D Member			
H. Hasan Basri Umar	NasDem	DKI Jakarta 3	6,879	NasDem; Member	B Member			
Wibi Andrino	NasDem	DKI Jakarta 7	14,561	NasDem; Chairman	A Member			
Nova Harivan Paloh	NasDem	DKI Jakarta 8	12,929	NasDem; Deputy Chairperson	D Deputy Chairperson			
Abdul Azis Muslim	NasDem	DKI Jakarta 9	7,484	NasDem; Secretary	E Member			
Jupiter	NasDem	DKI Jakarta 10	8,521	NasDem; Member	C Member			
Basri Baco	Golkar	DKI Jakarta 1	12,036	Golkar; Chairman	E Member			
Dimaz Raditya	Golkar	DKI Jakarta 2	10,635	Golkar; Treasurer	C Member			
Judistira Hermawan	Golkar	DKI Jakarta 4	7,483	Golkar; Secretary	D Member			
H. Taufik Azhar	Golkar	DKI Jakarta 5	9,514	Golkar; Deputy Chairman	B Deputy Chairman			
Jamaludin	Golkar	DKI Jakarta 6	8,398	Golkar; Deputy Secretary	A Member			
H.R. Khotibi Achyar	Golkar	DKI Jakarta 9	8,099	Golkar; Advisor	A Member			
H. Jamaluddin Lamanda	PKB	DKI Jakarta 3	13,703	PKB-PPP; Vice Chairman	D Member			
H. Hasbiallah Ilyas	PKB	DKI Jakarta 4	27,256	PKB-PPP; Chairman	A Member			
H. Sutikno	PKB	DKI Jakarta 7	17,746	PKB-PPP; Treasurer	B Member			
Yusuf	PKB	DKI Jakarta 8	11,345	PKB-PPP; Secretary	C Secretary			
H. Ahmad Ruslan	PKB	DKI Jakarta 9	8,980	PKB-PPP; Deputy Secretary	E Member			
H. Matnoor Tindoan	PPP	DKI Jakarta 6	21,553	PKB-PPP; Advisor	D Member			
H. Dina Masyusin	Perindo	DKI Jakarta 9	12,019	Democrats; Deputy Chairman E	D Member			

== See also ==
- Regional House of Representatives
