= 27 July 1996 incident =

Attack by the Indonesian army on the office of the Indonesian Democratic Party

- Part of Fall of Suharto
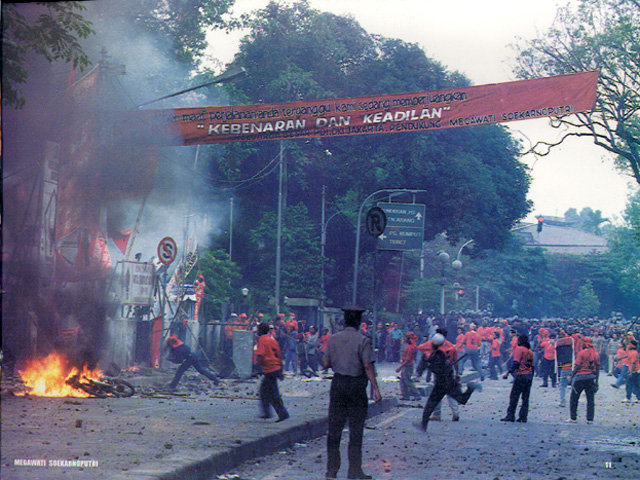
- Fighting broke out between PDI members from different factions, unhindered by riot police.
- Date: 27 – 29 July 1996
- Location: Jakarta, Indonesia
- Caused by: Government-sponsored effort to oust Megawati from the head office of the Indonesian Democratic Party
- Methods: Student demonstrations, riots

Parties
Supporters of Megawati Sukarnoputri	New Order government, Pancasila Youth, Indonesian Army

Casualties and losses
5 killed, 149 injured, 23 missing	

The 27 July Incident was an attack by Indonesian government forces on the head office of the Indonesian Democratic Party, which was being occupied by supporters of recently ousted party leader Megawati Sukarnoputri. It was followed by two days of riots in Jakarta.

== Background ==
After coming to power, the New Order regime of President Suharto took steps to consolidate its position, firstly turning the Golkar organization into the regime's political vehicle, then in 1973 pressuring the nine parties who had been allowed to contest the 1971 elections to merge into just two. The Islamic parties joined to form the United Development Party (PPP), while the nationalist and Christian parties fused into the Indonesian Democratic Party (PDI). Only these three organizations were allowed to contest the five-yearly elections, and Golkar always won a significant majority of the votes, partly because of government threats and intimidation.

In the 1987 elections, Megawati Sukarnoputri, daughter of Indonesia's first president, Sukarno agreed to stand for election and campaign for the PDI. She repeatedly invoked her father's name at election rallies, and the positive response to this from young voters was a shock for the government. She was elected, and took her seat in the People's Representative Council in October 1987. In the 1992 election campaign, the PDI called for significant reforms, including a two-term limit for the president, which prompted a direct response from President Suharto, who said such a call was an attack on the Constitution. The PDI garnered its highest ever vote, 14.9 percent due to its criticism of the government and use of Sukarno as a symbol. This increased share of the vote seemed to be mostly at the expense of Golkar. After repeated government interference in PDI leadership contests, Megawati became party chair in December 1993.

By 1996, support for the PDI was increasing among intellectuals, middle class city-dwellers and low income Jakartans. Some of Megawati's supporters urged her to run for the presidency. The Indonesian military subsequently intervened in an extraordinary PDI conference held in Medan from 20 to 24 June to depose Megawati, and reappoint former leader Soerjadi, who was seen as less of a threat. On 20 June, 5,000 people attended a demonstration in support of Megawati in Jakarta – some wearing "Megawati for President" t-shirts. Over 70 were injured in clashes with police and soldiers. In Medan, Soerjadi was duly elected party chair, but Megawati and her followers refused to recognize this, and launched a legal challenge. The PDI split into two factions, the government-recognized PDI led by Soerjadi recognized by the government, and the "PDI Mega" supported by the by grassroots membership.

== Attack on PDI headquarters ==
Following the Medan congress, Megawati's supporters refused to leave the party head office on Jalan Diponegoro, Menteng, Jakarta. They played music and listened to speeches attacking corruption in the government. The movement attracted support from other organizations, including the Indonesian Workers Welfare Union, led by former political prisoner Muchtar Pakpahan.

The government waited until an ASEAN summit had ended, and at 6.30am on Saturday 27 July, a time chosen to ensure the financial impact would be minimized, a mob claiming to be from the Soerjadi fraction, but actually organised by the government, attacked and occupied the headquarters. This mob included soldiers in civilian clothing and thugs from the army-associated Pemuda Pancasila organization. The attack resulted in many deaths and injuries. According to the National Human Rights Commission (Komnas HAM), 5 people were killed, 149 injured and 74 missing – mostly from those arrested by the military. The attack was followed by two days of rioting, in which youths burned at least 6 buildings, including that of the Ministry of Agriculture. This was the worst rioting in Jakarta since the 1984 Tanjung Priok incident.

=== Timeline of the violence ===
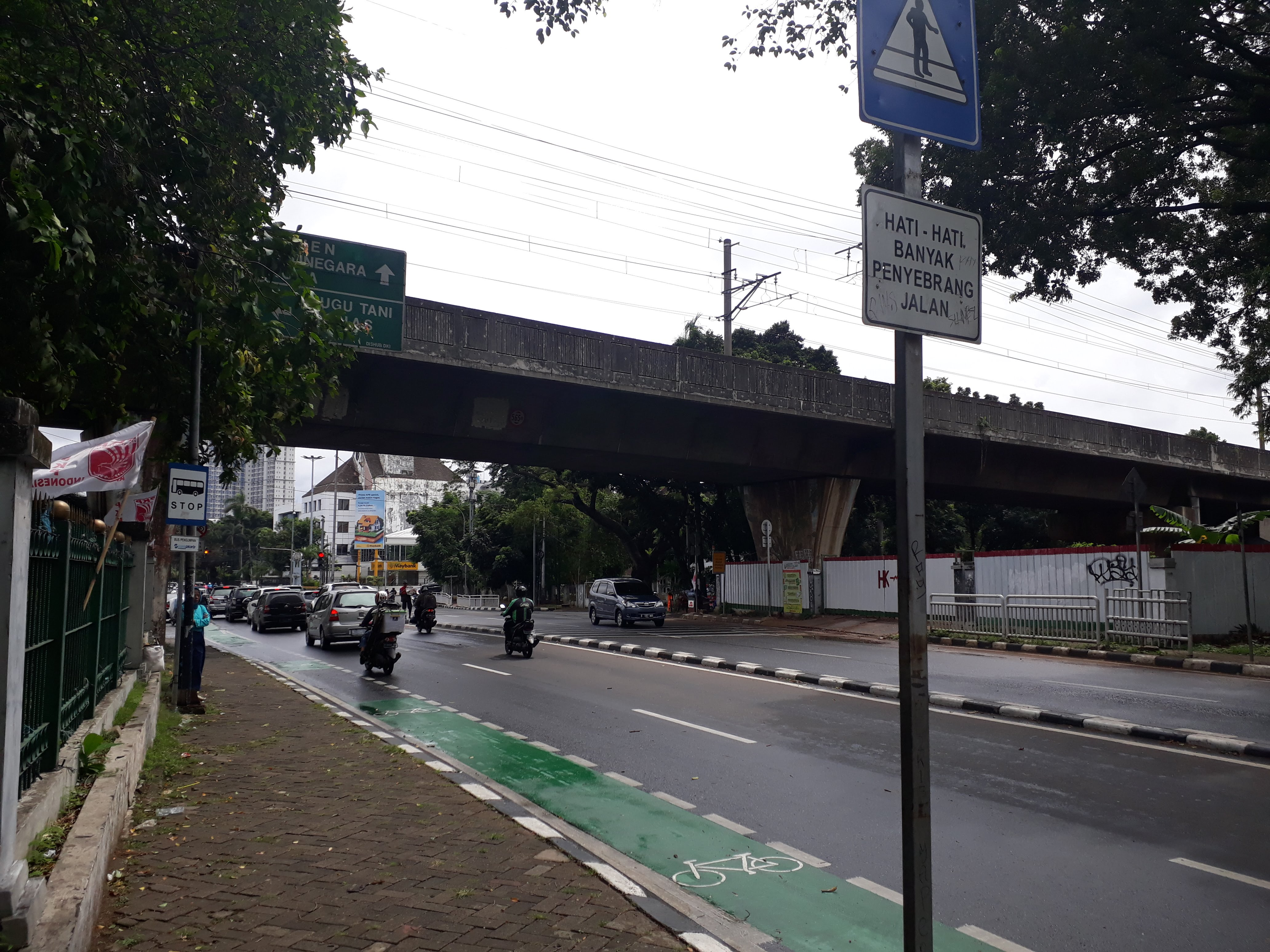
The railway bridge near the PDI head office where tanks were parked

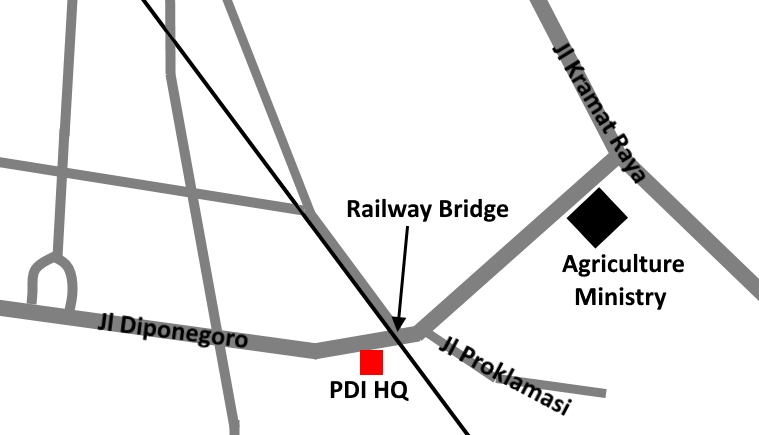
Sketch map of the area affected by the 27 July 1996 disturbances in Jakarta, Indonesia

The following is a chronology of the main events. All times in UTC+7

- 06:15 7 open-back trucks park in front of the PDI central office and disgorge a group of people in red T-shirts armed with clubs, who begin throwing stones at the building
- 06:30 Approximately 500 troops equipped with riot shields, batons and tear gas arrive and form two groups to block access to the stretch of Jl Diponegoro containing the PDI HQ. They prevent Megawati supporters from reaching the building.
- 06:40 Two tanks arrive and are parked under the railway bridge
- 07:40 Central Jakarta Police District commander Lt Col Abu Bakar stops the stone-throwing. He asks Megawati's supporters to leave PDI HQ, but they refuse, and also refuse the offer to evacuate the injured in police ambulances.
- 08:15 Stone-throwing restarts. Lt-Col Zul Effendi from the Central Jakarta District Military Command leads the red-clothed attackers in an attack on the PDI HQ perimeter fence. The attackers are given stones by the riot police. They breach the perimeter, start fires and ransack the building. The security forces assume control of the PDI HQ. Megawati supporters are detained. Other supporters prevented from approaching by the blockades set a bus on fire.
- 11:00 Megawati supporters breach the blockade. Battles with security forces ensue and large numbers of soldiers and armored vehicles arrive.
- 14:30 The crowd is dispersed by the security forces. Three more buses are burned.
- 15:10 Buildings in Jalan Kramat Raya are set alight.
- 17:10 Buildings and cars are set on fire in Jalan Proklamasi and in Senen.

== Aftermath ==
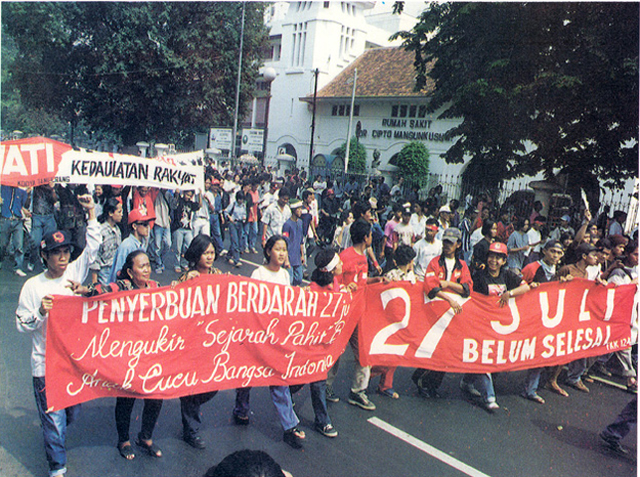
Protest by PDI-P supporters remembering the 27 July Incident

The government blamed the small leftist People's Democratic Party (PRD) for the disturbances, and the military accused it of being communist. As a result, several Islamic organizations, including the Muhammadiyah youth wing, the Indonesian Ulema Council, the Muslim Students' Association and the United Development Party all expressed support for the military action against the party. Budiman Sudjatmiko and other party leaders, as well as Muchtar Pakpahan, were arrested and tried for subversion. Budiman was jailed for 13 years, while his colleagues received shorter sentences. All were released in March 1999.

Megawati's legal challenge to the election of Soerjadi at the Medan congress failed after the Supreme Court issued a ruling that the Jakarta District Court did not have the authority to hear the case. Further demonstrations in support of Megawati took place in Jakarta. Both PDI factions put forward lists of legislative candidates for the 1997 elections, but the authorities recognized only the list produced by the Soerjadi faction. In protest, Megawati officially announced she would not be using her right to vote. The PDI vote collapsed in the election, with 80% of its voters switching to Golkar or the PPP.

Following the fall of Suharto in 1998, on 1 February 1999, the pro-Megawati faction of the PDI declared the formation of a new party, the Indonesian Democratic Party of Struggle, as the heir to the old PDI. The party won the largest share of the vote, 35%, of the 48 parties that contested the 1999 elections, the first democratic elections for 44 years, and in October of that year, Megawati became vice-president.
