= 2024 Bekasi regency election =

- 27 November 2024
- Turnout: 66.73%
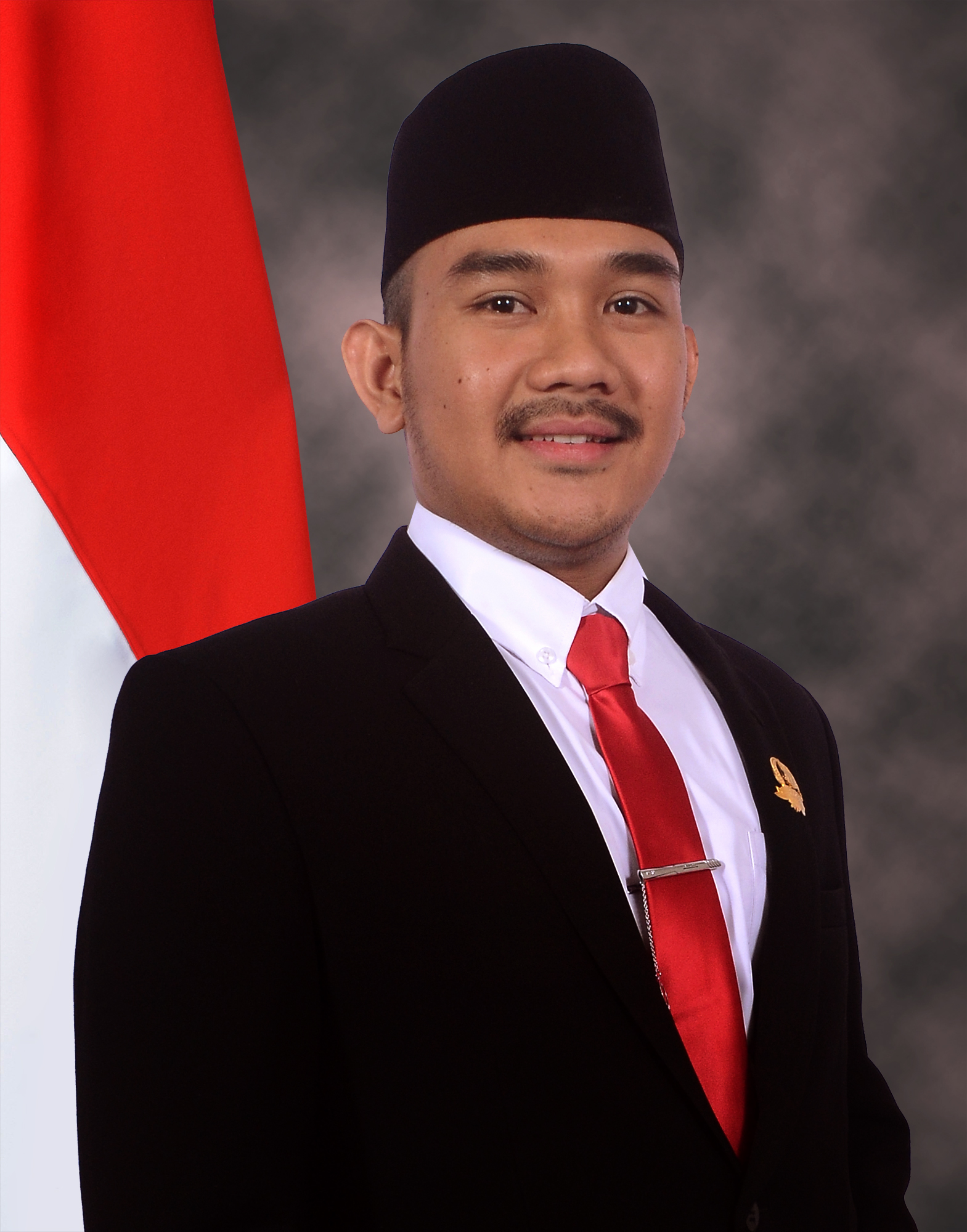

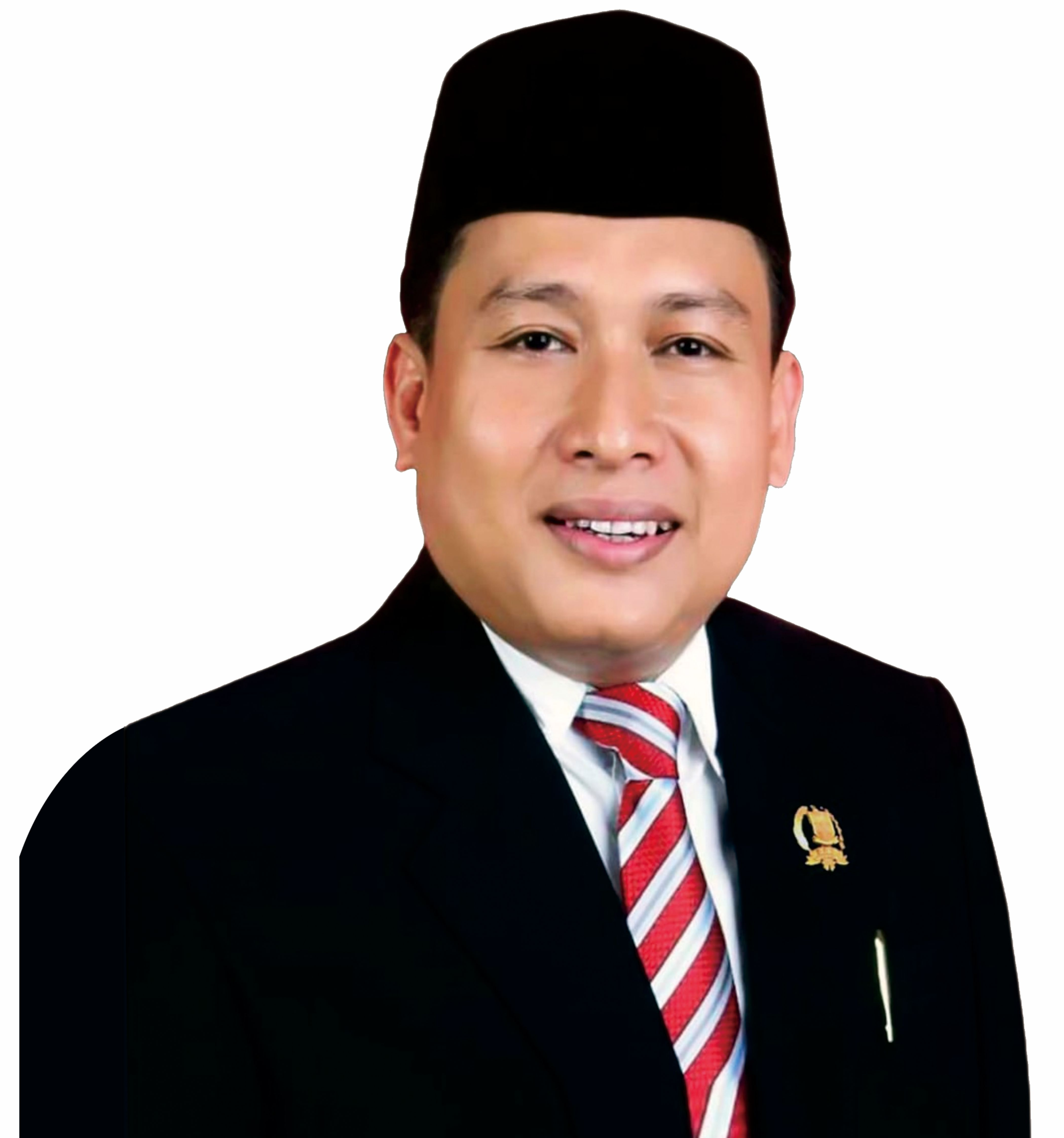

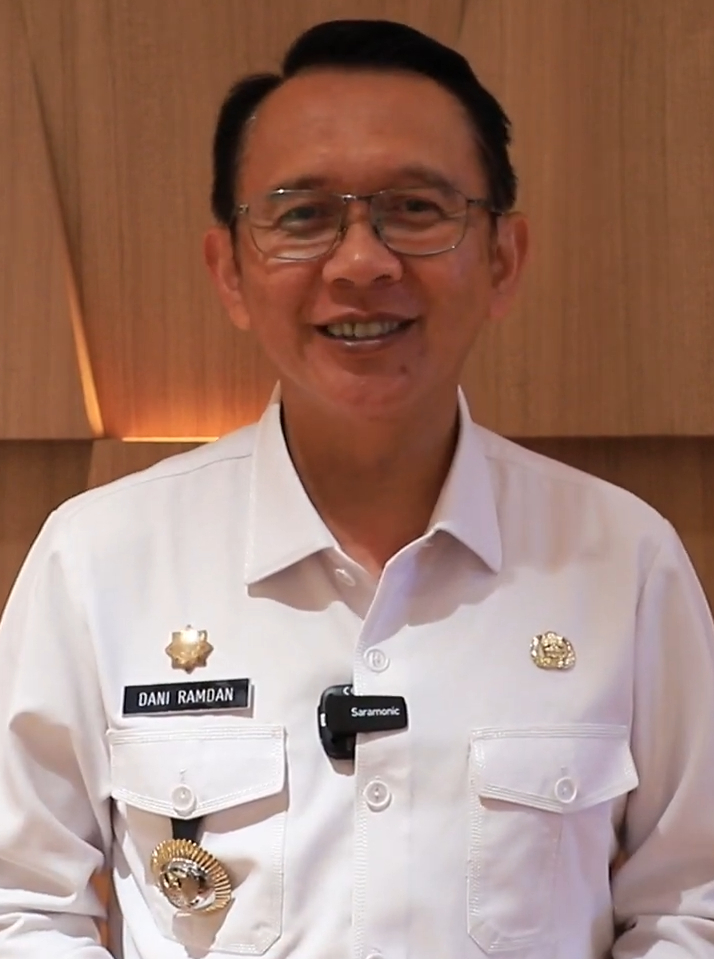
Candidate	Ade Kuswara Kunang	BN Holik Qodratullah	Dani Ramdan
Party	PDI-P	Gerindra	Golkar
Alliance	–	KIM Plus	–
Running mate	Asep Surya Atmaja	Faizal Hafan Farid	Romli
Popular vote	666,494	588,399	204,305
Percentage	45.68%	40.32%	14.00%
- Results by subdistrict and village (Interactive version)
Regent before election
Dani Ramdan (acting)
Independent
Elected Regent
Ade Kuswara Kunang
PDI-P

The 2024 Bekasi regency election was held on 27 November 2024 as part of nationwide local elections to elect the regent of Bekasi Regency for a five-year term. PDI-P candidate Ade Kuswara Kunang managed to secure a plurality of votes in a three-way election, defeating former regency legislator BN Holik Qodratullah and former acting regent Dani Ramdan.

== Electoral system ==
The election, like other local elections in 2024, followed the first-past-the-post system where the candidate with the most votes wins the election, even if they do not win a majority. It is possible for a candidate to run uncontested, in which case the candidate is still required to win a majority of votes "against" an "empty box" option. Should the candidate fail to do so, the election would have been repeated on a later date.

== Candidates ==
According to electoral regulations, in order to qualify for the election, candidates were required to secure support from a political party or a coalition of parties controlling 11 seats in the Bekasi Regency Regional House of Representatives. As no parties secured 11 seats or more in the 2024 legislative election, coalitions are required to nominate a candidate. Candidates may alternatively demonstrate support in form of photocopies of identity cards, which in Bekasi's case corresponds to 143,014 copies. An independent candidate registered for the election, but did not pass the requirements.

The previously elected regent, Neneng Hassanah Yasin, was arrested for corruption in 2018. Her replacement and elected vice regent, Eka Supria Atmaja, died of COVID-19 in 2021.

=== Ade–Asep ===
In June 2024, Bekasi Regency DPRD member Ade Kuswara Kunang received the recommendation of PDI-P to run in the election, and then received further endorsements from the United Development Party and the Crescent Star Party. Late that month, the Labour Party proposed that Asep Surya Atmaja, a Golkar politician and younger brother of deceased former regent Eka Supria Atmaja, become Ade's running mate. After Asep moved from Golkar to Labour, the ticket was approved by the supporting parties.

=== BN Holik–Faizal ===
On 13 August 2024, Speaker of Bekasi's DPRD BN Holik Qodratulloh received an endorsement from the Gerindra Party to run in the regency election. Gerindra named the Prosperous Justice Party (PKS) provincial legislator Faizal Hafan Farid as his running mate, although PKS had not given Faizal party approval yet. The ticket eventually received PKS' endorsement, and further endorsements were given by the National Mandate Party and the NasDem Party.

=== Dani–Romli ===
Dani Ramdan, a civil servant who was appointed acting regent of Bekasi in 2022, opted to run in the regency election and resigned from his post to do so. As running mate, he selected Romli, former head of Bekasi's National Sports Committee of Indonesia branch. The ticket was supported by a coalition of six parties: Golkar, PKB, Demokrat, PSI, Gelora, and Hanura.

=== Did not run ===
The following are individuals who have either been publicly mentioned as a potential candidate by a political party in the DPRD, publicly declared their candidacy with press coverage, or considered as a potential candidate by press, but ultimately did not run:

- Akhmad Marjuki (Golkar), acting regent of Bekasi (2021–2022), vice regent of Bekasi (2021), chairman of Bekasi Regency's Golkar branch.
- Rieke Diah Pitaloka (PDI-P), member of the House of Representatives.

== Political map ==
Following the 2024 Indonesian general election, ten political parties are represented in the Bekasi Regency Regional House of Representatives:

Political parties	Seat count
Party of Functional Groups (Golkar)	10 / 55
Indonesian Democratic Party of Struggle (PDI-P)	8 / 55
Great Indonesia Movement Party (Gerindra)	8 / 55
National Awakening Party (PKB)	7 / 55
Prosperous Justice Party (PKS)	7 / 55
Democratic Party (Demokrat)	4 / 55
NasDem Party	3 / 55
National Mandate Party (PAN)	3 / 55
United Development Party (PPP)	2 / 55
Labour Party	2 / 55
Crescent Star Party (PBB)	1 / 55

== Results ==
Candidate	Running mate	Party	Votes	%
Ade Kuswara Kunang	Asep Surya Atmaja	Indonesian Democratic Party of Struggle	666,494	45.68
BN Holik Qodratulloh	Faizal Hafan Farid	Gerindra Party	588,399	40.32
Dani Ramdan	Romli	Golkar	204,305	14.00
Total			1,459,198	100.00
Valid votes			1,459,198	97.11
Invalid/blank votes			43,499	2.89
Total votes			1,502,697	100.00
Registered voters/turnout			2,251,856	66.73
Source: Bekasi KPU

Candidate vote share by subdistrict and village
Dani–Romli

Holik–Faizal

Ade–Asep

== Aftermath ==
In the immediate aftermath of the election, both the Ade–Asep and the BN Holik–Faizal campaigns claimed victory citing their own counts. The Bekasi General Elections Commission announced Ade's victory on 6 December 2024. Ade and Asep were sworn in as regent and vice-regent on 20 February 2025, with Ade becoming Bekasi's youngest ever regent at 31 years and 6 months.
