= Ade Kuswara Kunang =

Indonesian politician

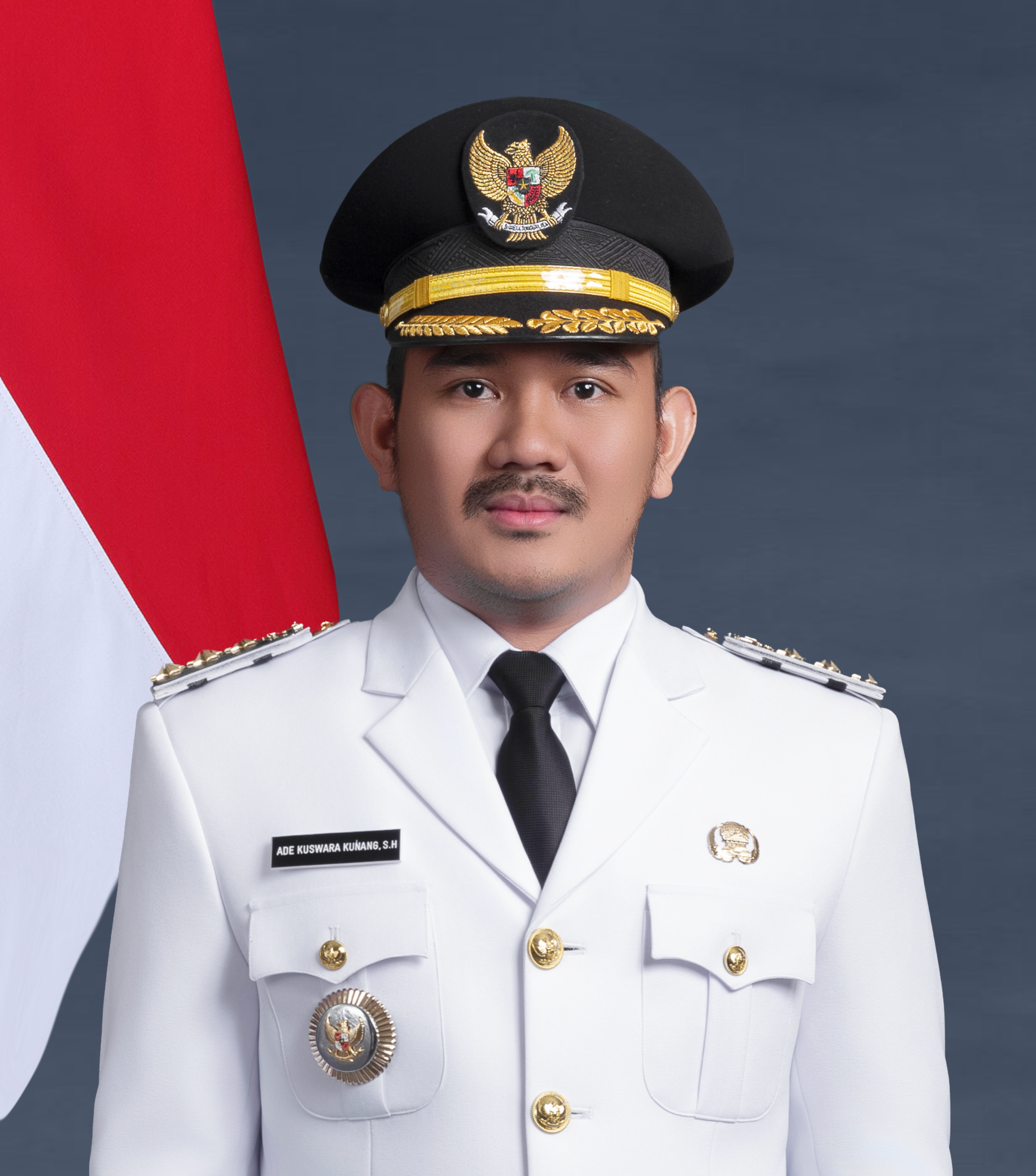
- Official portrait, 2025

Regent of Bekasi
- In office 20 February 2025 – 20 December 2025
- Preceded by: Eka Supria Atmaja; Dedy Supriyadi (act.)
- Succeeded by: Asep Surya Atmaja (act.)

Member of Bekasi Regency DPRD
- In office 5 September 2019 – 5 September 2024

Personal details
- Born: 15 August 1993 (age 32) Bekasi, West Java, Indonesia
- Party: PDI-P
- Spouse: Marlynda Ade Kuswara (m. 2018)
- Education: President University

Ade Kuswara Kunang (born 15 August 1993) is an Indonesian politician of the Indonesian Democratic Party of Struggle who served as the regent of Bekasi from February until his arrest in December 2025. He was previously a member of Bekasi's regional legislature in 2019–2024.

== Early life ==
Ade Kuswara Kunang was born on 15 August 1993 within Cikarang district of Bekasi Regency. His father, M. Kunang, was the founder of several local mass organizations and the village head of Sukadami, a village within Cikarang. He completed his basic education within Cikarang, graduating from a public high school in South Cikarang District in 2012. He then received a bachelor's degree in law from President University (also in Cikarang) in 2016.

== Career ==
In the 2019 legislative election, Kunang was elected into Bekasi's municipal legislature as a PDI-P member. He would be reelected for a second term in 2024, winning 17,773 votes – fourth highest of all 854 candidates contesting 55 seats.

Kunang ran as a candidate for regent in the Bekasi's 2024 regency election with Labour Party member Asep Surya Atmaja as running mate. Aside from PDI-P and Labour, they were supported by PPP and PBB. The pair won the election with 666,494 votes (45.7%). They were sworn in on 20 February 2025. At the age of 31 years and 6 months, Kunang became the youngest regent in Bekasi's history, slightly younger than Neneng Hassanah Yasin's 2012 record at 31 years and 10 months.

Upon being sworn in as regent, Kunang announced increases in incentive payments to Quran reading teachers and RT/RW administrators in Bekasi. The municipal government also launched a WhatsApp hotline for reporting issues within the regency.

On 18 December 2025, Kunang was arrested by the Corruption Eradication Commission. He was designated a suspect on 20 December, being accused of receiving Rp 14.2 billion (USD 850,000) in bribes. His father was also arrested under suspicion of having facilitated the bribe payments. His vice regent Atmaja was appointed acting regent.

== Family ==
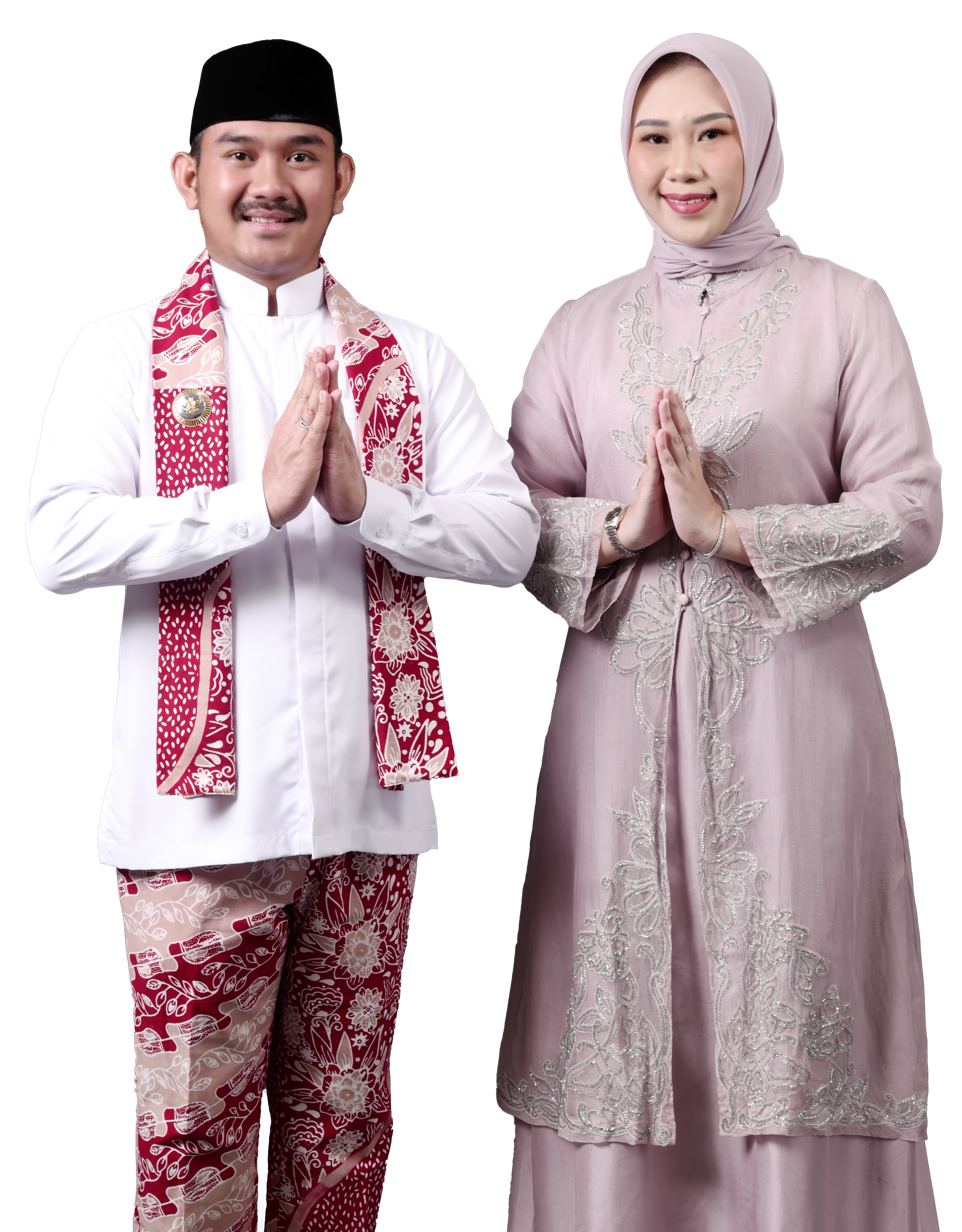
Ade Kuswara Kunang and his wife Marlynda Ade Kuswara

He married Marlynda in 2018.
