= Dani Ramdan =

Indonesian bureaucrat

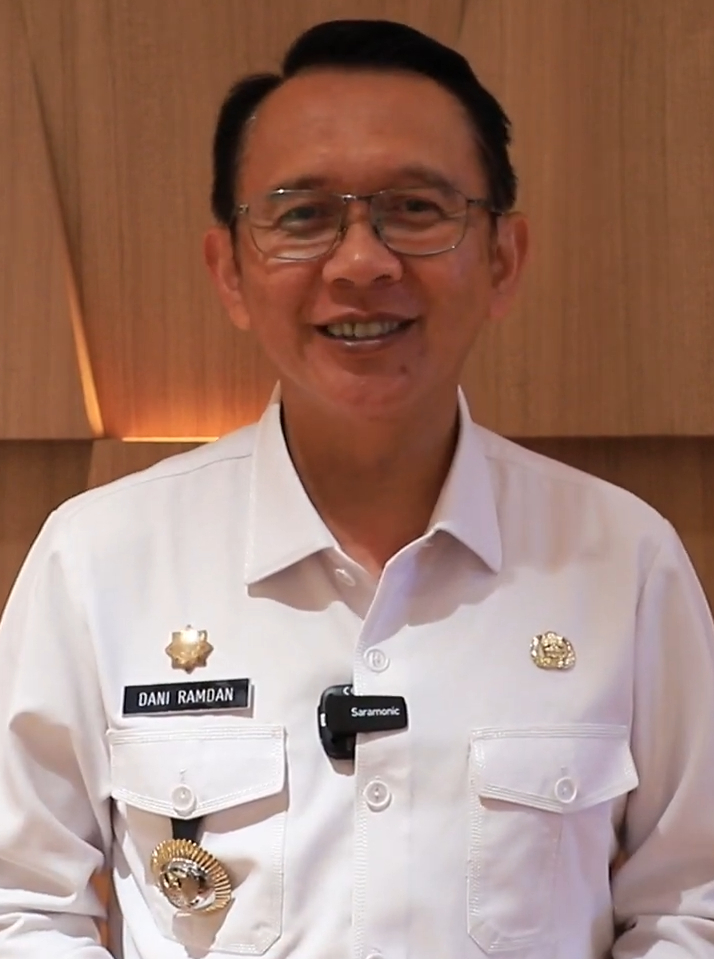

Regent of Bekasi (acting)
- In office 23 May 2022 – 15 August 2024
- President: Joko Widodo
- Governor: Ridwan Kamil; Bey Machmudin (acting)
- Preceded by: Akhmad Marjuki (acting)
- Succeeded by: Dedy Supriyadi (acting)
- In office 23 July 2021 – 27 October 2021
- President: Joko Widodo
- Governor: Ridwan Kamil
- Preceded by: Herman Hanafi (acting)
- Succeeded by: Akhmad Marjuki (acting)

Regent of Pangandaran (acting)
- In office 25 September 2020 – 5 December 2020
- President: Joko Widodo
- Governor: Ridwan Kamil
- Preceded by: Jeje Wiradinata
- Succeeded by: Kusdiana (acting); Jeje Wiradinata

Personal details
- Born: January 12, 1970 (age 56) Garut, West Java, Indonesia
- Education: Home Affairs Governance Academy (1991); Gadjah Mada University; Padjadjaran University

Dani Ramdan (born 1 December 1969) is an Indonesian bureaucrat. He served as acting regent of Bekasi between 2022 and 2024. He had held this position before from July to October 2021, and as the acting regent of Pangandaran from September to December 2020. His permanent position in the government was as chief of West Java Regional Agency for Disaster Countermeasure.

== Early life and education ==
Dani was born in Garut on 1 December 1969 as the oldest child of four. His father worked as a teacher, while his mother worked as a vendor. He began his education at the Cibatu state primary school. His family moved to Bandung when he was in the 3rd grade and resumed his education in the Sarijadi primary school until 1982. He then continued his education at the 12nd Bandung State Junior High School in Setiabudi in 1985 and 2nd Bandung State High School in 1988.

Upon finishing high school, Dani studied at the Home Affairs Governance Academy and graduated in 1991. He received his bachelor's degree in governance sciences from the Institute of Governance Sciences in 1996, master's degree in city and regional planning from the Gadjah Mada University in 2000, and doctor in administrative sciences from the Padjadjaran University in 2012.

== Career ==
Dani began his career as an employee in the West Java Income Agency. He was then appointed as aide-de-camp to West Java's governor Nana Nuriana in 2001. After Nuriana was replaced by Danny Setiawan, Danny assigned him as a conceptor in the governor's office. He was rotated to West Java's regional planning agency in 2009, serving as chief of socio-cultural affairs from January to August that year. From October 2011 to September 2013, Dani was the secretary of the regional employee agency of West Java. He then became the chief of institutional affairs in West Java's regional secretariat from September 2013 to October 2014 and the secretary of West Java's sports and youth service from October 2014 to August 2018.

Dani returned to the West Java's regional secretariat in August 2018 upon receiving promotion as the chief of the governance and cooperation bureau. After about two years, in 2020 Governor Ridwan Kamil offered him three positions, with the first position being the chief of West Java Regional Agency for Disaster Countermeasure (BPBD, Badan Penanggulangan Bencana Daerah), a hands-on position, and two other behind-the-desk positions. Dani opted to become the chief of West Java's BPBD instead. Dani's new position was not foreign to him, as he had previously been assigned to the West Java Red Cross for eight years.

Dani was installed as BPBD chief on 1 July 2020, in the midst of the COVID-19 pandemic in Indonesia. He replaced the retiring Supriyatno.

Dani was appointed as the acting regent of Pangandaran from 25 September to 5 December 2020. During his brief stint, Dani launched a program of social assistance for impoverished households in Pangandaran to alleviate COVID-19 induced hardships in the region.

On 23 July 2021, Dani was appointed as the acting regent of Bekasi, filling in the vacancy of the post following the death of regent Eka Supria Atmaja on 11 July 2021. During his three months his office, Dani oversaw major improvements in Bekasi's handling of COVID-19, but faced major opposition from local groups. He ended his tenure on 27 October and was replaced by Akhmad Marjuki. Akhmad was originally elected by Bekasi's council as Eka's deputy, but his inauguration as deputy regent was never done during Eka's lifetime. As Eka's original five-year term ended on 2022, Akhmad had to resign on 23 May 2022.

Dani returned as Bekasi's acting regent following Akhmad's resignation. His one-year term as acting regent was extended in 2023 and 2024, thus making him one of the longest-serving acting regent in the period. Dani's term extension was mostly due to the support of the Prosperous Justice Party group in the Bekasi regional council, who consistently nominated him for the position. The National Awakening Party also supported Dani's second term extension in 2024 in order to maintain stability with the stakeholders. However, protests surfaced from the Indonesian Democratic Party of Struggle group in the council, who claimed that Dani has consistently failed to improve Bekasi's roads, alleviate poverty and joblessness, as well as a lack of budget usage.

Shortly after his first term extension in 2023, a group of Bekasi locals demanded Dani's resignation, claiming that he failed to obtain a satisfactory opinion for Bekasi's financial report from the Audit Board of Indonesia. Similar protests occurred in August and September of the same month.

In December 2023, Dani was named as a front-runner candidate for the Provincial Secretary of West Java, the most senior bureaucratic position in the province. Shortly after the announcement, a group of students demanded Dani's resignation, citing possible conflict of interest. On 15 August 2024, he resigned from his acting regent position to run in Bekasi's regency election that year, with Dedy Supriyadi replacing him as acting regent. Dani won 204,305 votes (14%), placing last in the election which was won by PDI-P's Ade Kuswara Kunang.
