= Asep Surya Atmaja =

Indonesian physician and politician

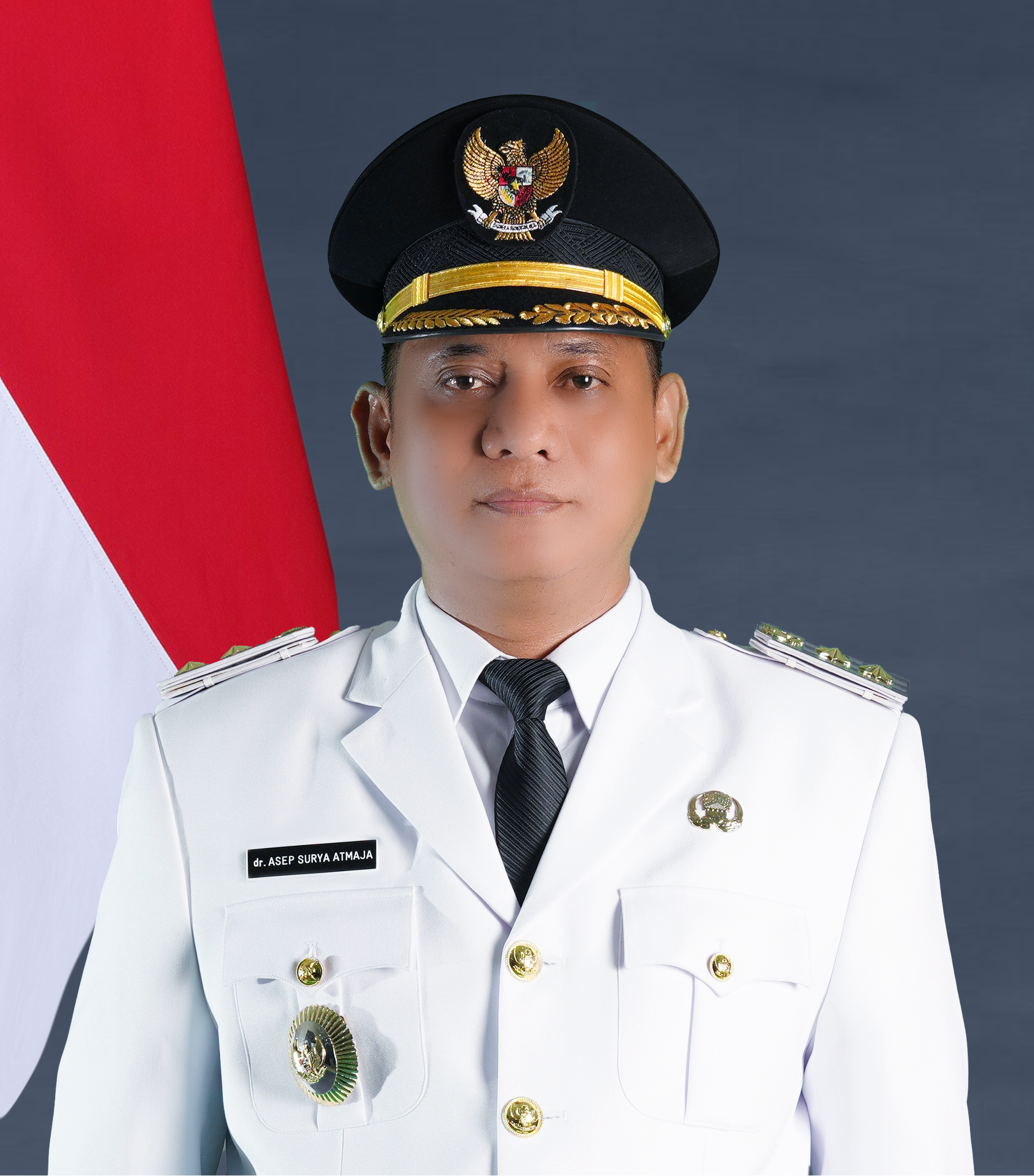

Acting Regent of Bekasi
- Incumbent
- Assumed office 20 December 2025
- Preceded by: Ade Kuswara Kunang

Vice Regent of Bekasi
- In office 20 February 2025 – 20 December 2025
- Regent: Ade Kuswara Kunang
- Preceded by: Akhmad Marjuki

Member of Bekasi Regency DPRD
- In office 2019–2024

Personal details
- Born: 22 June 1976 (age 49) Bekasi, West Java, Indonesia
- Party: Labour (since 2024); Golkar (before 2024)

Asep Surya Atmaja (born 22 June 1976) is an Indonesian physician and politician of the Labour Party. He has served as acting regent of Bekasi Regency since December 2025, after previously being regent from February to December 2025. He was also previously a municipal legislator between 2019 and 2024.

== Early life ==
Asep Surya Atmaja was born in the village of Waluya, within Bekasi Regency, to Ojoy Jarkasih and Enjuh Juhriah on 22 June 1976. Jarkasih was village head of Waluya. After completing basic education within Bekasi, he studied medicine at Trisakti University, graduating in 2004.

== Career ==
After graduating from Trisakti, Atmaja practiced medicine and later opened his own clinic.

In the 2019 Indonesian legislative election, Atmaja was elected into the Bekasi Regency's Regional House of Representatives (DPRD) as a Golkar member. Within the DPRD, he became head of Golkar's parliamentary faction.

In 2024, Atmaja unsuccessfully ran for a seat in the national House of Representatives from West Java's 7th district (Bekasi, Karawang, and Purwakarta regencies). Later that year, he received a recommendation from the Labour Party to run in Bekasi Regency's 2024 local election, and he resigned from Golkar in August 2024 to accept this recommendation. In the election, he became running mate to PDI-P's Ade Kuswara Kunang, and the pair won the election with 666,494 votes (45.7%). They were sworn in on 20 February 2025.

As vice regent, Atmaja toured Bekasi's industrial parks to lobby the companies to increase the proportion of local employees. On 20 December 2025, following Kunang's arrest by the Corruption Eradication Commission, Atmaja was appointed acting regent.

== Family ==
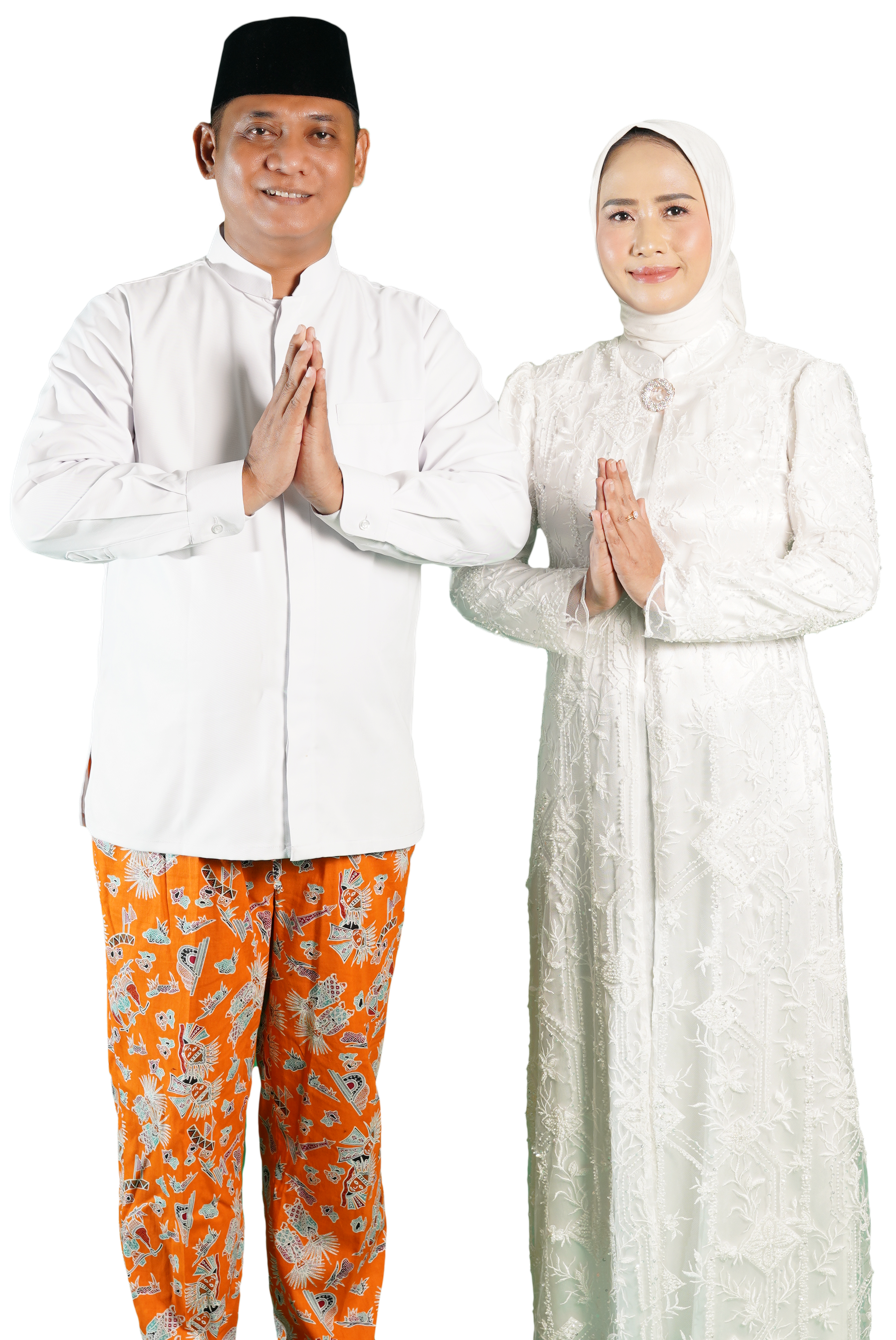
Asep Surya Atmaja and his wife Nia Asep Surya

He is married to Nia, and the couple has a daughter. His elder brother, Eka Supria Atmaja, served as regent of Bekasi from 2019 until his death from COVID-19 in 2021.
