= Labour Party (Indonesia, 1998) =

Labour Party Partai Buruh
- Chairman: Muchtar Pakpahan (first); Sonny Pudjisasono (last)
- Secretary-General: Agus Supriadi (daily acting)
- Founded: 28 August 1998
- Dissolved: 5 October 2021
- Succeeded by: Labour Party (2021)
- Headquarters: Jakarta
- Ideology: Pancasila; Democratic socialism Social democracy Left-wing populism
- Political position: Centre-left to left-wing
- Ballot number: 44

Website
- partaiburuh.org

The Labour Party (Indonesian: Partai Buruh) was a democratic socialist political party in Indonesia.

== History ==
The party had its origins in the Indonesian Workers Welfare Union (SBSI), which in 1993 threw its support behind the Indonesian Democratic Party (PDI) as a vehicle for its political aspirations. When the PDI split in 1996, it allied itself with the breakaway faction led by Megawati Sukarnoputri, which led to it coming under pressure from the New Order government of President Suharto.

On 30 July 1996, SBSI chairman Muchtar Pakpahan was detained on subversion charges. Following the fall of Suharto in 1998, the SBSI, which now had become disillusioned with Megawati's now renamed Indonesian Democratic Party of Struggle, decided to establish its own party, the National Labour Party (Indonesian: Partai Buruh Nasional). After its failure in 1999 election, the party changed its name to the Social Democratic Labour Party (Indonesian: Partai Buruh Sosial Demokrat). Using this name, the party stood in the 2004 Indonesian legislative election but won only 0.6 percent of the vote and no legislative seats. However, the party has 12 representatives in provincial assemblies. The party subsequently changed its name to the Labour Party.

After initially failing to qualify, following a lawsuit the party won the right to contest the 2009 elections. However, the party won only 0.25 percent of the vote, less than the 2.5 percent electoral threshold, meaning it was awarded no seats in the People's Representative Council. It also lost most of its regional-level representation. It subsequently did not qualify for the 2014 and 2019 elections.

On 5 October 2021, the party, together with other 10 Indonesian labour mass organizations re-formed into the newly reformed Labour Party.

== Election results ==
=== Presidential election results ===
Election	Ballot number	Candidate	Running mate	1st round (Total votes)	Share of votes	Outcome	2nd round (Total votes)	Share of votes	Outcome
2004	3	Amien Rais	Siswono Yudo Husodo	17,392,931	14.66%	Lost	Eliminated		
2009	1	Megawati Sukarnoputri	Prabowo Subianto	32,548,105	26.79%	Lost			

=== Legislative election results ===
Election	Ballot number	Leader	Seats		Total votes	Share of votes	Outcome of election
Election	Ballot number	Leader	No.	±	Total votes	Share of votes	Outcome of election
1999	37 (Note: as National Labour Party)	Muchtar Pakpahan	0 / 462		140,980	0.13%	Opposition
2004	2 (Note: as Social Democrats Labour Party)	Muchtar Pakpahan	0 / 550	0	636,397	0.56%	Opposition
2009	44 (Note: as Labour Party)	Muchtar Pakpahan	0 / 560	0	265,203	0.25%	Opposition
