= Said Iqbal =

Indonesian politician

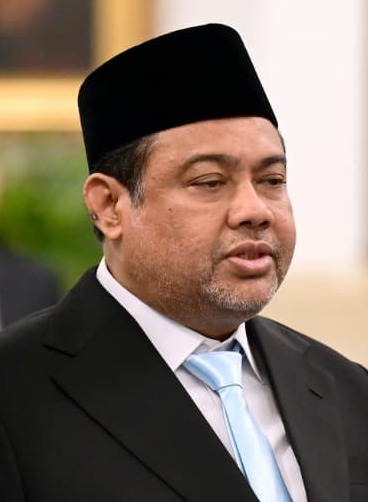
- Said in 2026

Special Advisor to the President on Labor Affairs and Workers Welfare
- Incumbent
- Assumed office 8 June 2026
- President: Prabowo Subianto
- Preceded by: Position established

1st President of the Labour Party
- Incumbent
- Assumed office 5 October 2021
- Preceded by: Position established

3rd Chairperson of the Indonesian Trade Union Confederation
- Incumbent
- Assumed office 2012
- Preceded by: Rindo Rindo

Personal details
- Born: 5 July 1968 (age 58) Jakarta, Indonesia
- Party: Labour (since 2021)
- Spouse: Ika Liviana Gumay (died 2019) Indri Yuli Hartati ()
- Children: 3
- Education: University of Indonesia; Jayabaya University

Said Iqbal (born 5 July 1968) is an Indonesian labour activist and politician. He is the first president of the Labour Party, founded in 2021, and has served as president of the Indonesian Trade Union Confederation since 2012. He had been active in labour activism since 1992.

== Early life and education ==
Said Iqbal was born on 5 July 1968 in Jakarta. His parents hailed from Aceh – his father from Pidie and his mother from Meulaboh. After graduating from high school, he enrolled at the University of Indonesia's polytechnic to study mechanical engineering, later obtaining a bachelor's degree from Jayabaya University. He later returned to the University of Indonesia, obtaining a master's degree in economics.

== Business career ==
According to Said, he worked for 30 years at multinational companies, and upon his retirement received a severance pay of "billions" of rupiah.

== Advocacy career ==
Said's labour activism began in 1992, when he worked at an electronics factory in Bekasi Regency. Following the fall of Suharto, he co-founded the All-Indonesia Federation of Metalworkers, later becoming the federation's secretary general under Thamrin Mosii. During this time, he helped formulate a number of labour laws. In 2012, he was elected as president of the Indonesian Trade Union Confederation, and was reelected by acclamation in 2017. He was elected for a third term in 2022.

In 2012, Said led national strikes and protests against outsourcing. He also led protests against the Omnibus Law on Job Creation. Responding to a 2022 legislative discussion on revising the Omnibus Law, Said threatened a strike of three million labourers if the discussion was rushed. He is a deputy member of the International Labour Organization's governing body for the 2021–2024 term.

== Political career ==
Said unsuccessfully ran as a candidate to represent the Riau Islands in the People's Representative Council in the 2009 Indonesian legislative election, under the Prosperous Justice Party. in the 2014 Indonesian presidential election he backed Prabowo Subianto's campaign to become president under the tacit promise of being made Minister of Manpower in a Prabowo Presidency. On 5 October 2021, he was elected as President of the newly declared Labour Party. Said stated that the Labour Party would not form a coalition with any political parties supporting the Omnibus Law, but would instead form coalitions with 2024 presidential candidates on a "personal" basis with a campaign team separate to the candidate's official campaign team.

== Personal life ==
He was married to Ika Liviana Gumay (d. 17 July 2019). The couple had three daughter.
