= Indonesian National Christian Party =

Indonesian National Christian Party Partai Kristen Nasional Indonesia
- Abbreviation: Krisna
- Chairman: Clara Sitompul Tambunan
- Secretary-General: Didiek Sugito
- Founded: 20 May 1998
- Split from: Indonesian Democratic Party (Christian's element)
- Headquarters: Jakarta
- Ideology: Pancasila; Christian democracy Pro-military

The Indonesian National Christian Party (abbreviated as Krisna) is a political party in Indonesia. It was founded on 20 May 1998 during the fall of the New Order government.

The inaugural chairperson of the party was Clara Sitompul, a former high-ranking official in the New Order-sponsored Indonesian Democratic Party.

== Ideology ==
Keeping in line with the nominally secular and pluralist nature of Christian political parties in the post-Suharto era in Indonesia, the party's constitution does not explicitly declare Christianity as the foundation or official religion of the party, unlike Islam-based political parties which explicitly states Islam as their foundation.

Krisna's support base consists of Protestant Christians, sharing the constituency with the similarly Christian-based (albeit less explicitly Protestant and more ecumenical) Democratic Party Love of the Nation (PDKB), while some Catholic Indonesians joined the Catholic Democratic Party (PKD). There was no cooperation between the three parties.

The party's programme stated that it was committed to reform, but it also supported continuing the influence of the armed forces, a cornerstone of the New Order regime: it explicitly advocated for retaining the military's dual role (dwifungsi) within the Indonesian government, in contrast with PDKB's more explicitly reformist programme.

== 1999 elections ==
The party participated in the 1999 Indonesian legislative election where it was assigned the ballot number 2. The number, which from the 1977 election until the 1997 election was assigned to the ruling Golkar party, caused confusion in some rural populations which inadvertently voted for Krisna due to the ballot number. The unusually large vote returns for Krisna (surpassing its Catholic counterpart PKD and eight Islamic parties) may be contributed to this phenomenon.

The party won 369.719 votes in the election (0.35% of the national vote), which would have enabled it to win seats in the House of Representatives, but Krisna's vote share was too spread out nationally to win any single parliamentary constituency (compared to PDKB and PKD's concentrated voting patterns which enabled them to win national parliamentary seats).

On the subnational level, the party won 4% of the vote in North Sulawesi (where it held the title of the largest new post-Reformasi party in the province) and 2% in Maluku, and found considerable municipal-level support in North Tapanuli Regency where it won third place (6.3%, after PDIP and Golkar), Minahasa Regency (6.8%), and Biak Numfor Regency (10.1%).

The party won one seat in the Central Kalimantan provincial council, making it the only Christian party present in the council in the 1999-2004 period. The party also found considerable support in Maluku, where it won one seat in the provincial legislature and one seat in every municipal council in the province except in Buru Regency.

The party failed to qualify for the 2004 Indonesian legislative election and disappeared from Indonesian political life thereafter.

== Election results ==
=== People's Representative Council ===
Election	Ballot number	Leader	Seats		Votes		Outcome of election
Election	Ballot number	Leader	No.	±	Total	%	Outcome of election
1999	2	Clara Sitompul Tambunan	0 / 462		369,719	0.35%	Opposition
