= Indonesian Democratic Union Party =

Political organization

Indonesian Democratic Union Party Partai Uni Demokrasi Indonesia
- Abbreviation: PUDI
- Chairman: Sri Bintang Pamungkas
- Secretary-General: Husni Akbar Lubis
- Founded: 29 May 1996 (Officially recognized)
- Headquarters: Jl. Fatmawati, No. 40 Blok A, Kebayoran Baru, Jakarta Selatan
- Ideology: Religious Democracy; Reformism; Anti-authoritarianism; Populism
- Ballot number: 36

Website
- https://unidemokrasi.wordpress.com/

The Indonesian Democratic Union Party, (Indonesian: Partai Uni Demokrasi Indonesia, abbreviated PUDI), was a political party founded by Sri Bintang Pamungkas in 1995 and one of the political parties in Indonesia that participated in the 1999 general elections.

The party was born long before the reformation era, when the government banned the establishment of parties other than the three major parties at the time, namely Golkar, PPP and PDI. In fact, the idea to establish a party had actually been around since 1993, inspired by the fact that the existing parties were not aspirational. PUDI also positioned itself as an opposition party, which is a key part of democratic life. Due to this PUDI was considered as the first genuine opposition party against the New Order, challenging the authoritarian and militaristic regime of President Suharto.

== Origins ==
=== White group movement ===
PUDI stemmed from the White group movement. The White group (golput) is a moral movement that was initiated on 3 June 1971 at Balai Budaya Jakarta, a month before the voting day of the first election in the New Order era was held. Arief Budiman, one of the exponents of golput, argued that the movement was not to achieve political victory, but rather to create a tradition where there was a guarantee of dissent from the authorities in any situation. According to this group, with or without elections, the effective force that largely determines the future fate of the country is ABRI. Most of the leaders who initiated Golput were "Angkatan '66", although some "Angkatan '66" leaders were accommodated by the New Order in the system. Some of them became members of the DPR-GR and even ministers. However, there were also those who remained critical against the new regime, which was considered to have broken the promise. The launch of the movement was followed by the posting of campaign pamphlets stating that they would not participate in the elections. Marked with a pentagon with a white base, with lasting effects even until today, the campaign received an immediate counter-response from the authorities.

=== Committee formation ===
For years, activist Sri Bintang Pamungkas was frustrated by the strings of politics attached to president Suharto during the New Order. In June 1995, after a long campaign for the formation of a new party throughout the country and even abroad, a committee was formed to establish a new party. The committee was chaired by Sri Bintang Pamungkas himself with Saleh Abdullah as secretary, Rani Yunish and Jus Soema di Pradja as members. The name of the Indonesian Democratic Union Party itself came about as a spur of the moment remark delivered at a press conference when responding to the rise of new mass organisations using the same name as political parties of the past, such as PNI-Baru, Parkindo-Baru and Masyumi-Baru.

The committee considered that the emergence of these organisations was part of the freedom of association. They thought that the establishment of a new party was a direct leap, without any "bluff", to make political changes in the country. According to the committee, Community Organisations (Ormas) is only a moral movement, not a political movement, so it has not been able to make meaningful changes during the New Order. The committee realised that all had the same goal of making changes to the existing political situation. After a series of meetings between the New Party Formation Committee and several leaders of the renewal and pro-democracy movements, the declaration or proclamation of the new party, the Indonesian Democratic Union Party, was finally made on 9 May 1995, coinciding with 10 Muharram 1417 Hijri.

== History ==
=== Establishment ===
In April 1995, the day before the founding of PUDI, Bintang was awaiting a verdict from the prosecutor's office regarding a demonstration case in Dresden, where Bintang was detained at Soekarno-Hatta International Airport for defaming President Suharto while giving a lecture in Germany as a University professor. Bintang intended to use this moment to inaugurate his new party. The goal was to save time and to make the public aware of the new party because at that time Bintang was often highlighted by the media so that Bintang's new party could attract the attention of the wider community.

In the inauguration of PUDI which was attended by a number of protest activists at the Indonesian Legal Aid Foundation (YLBHI) office in Jakarta, Bintang read out the Proclamation of Party Establishment which was part of the booklet Political Manifesto, Basic Design and Structure of PUDI which also contained the party's bylaws. The event was also attended by psychic Permadi, LBH Indonesia Foundation Board Chairman Bambang Widjojanto, founder of the New Masyumi Party Ridwan Saidi, SK Trimurti, and former LBHI Foundation Board Chairman Adnan Buyung Nasution.

In 1995, unlike the three government-sponsored political parties (referred to as Social-Political Organization, Orsopol, by the New Order government), which each included only one or two of the Garuda Pancasila emblems and had one party color, PUDI, which took the red-white-green party colour, made the entire Garuda Pancasila emblem complete with its shield as the party emblem as in the cover of PUDI's political manifesto.

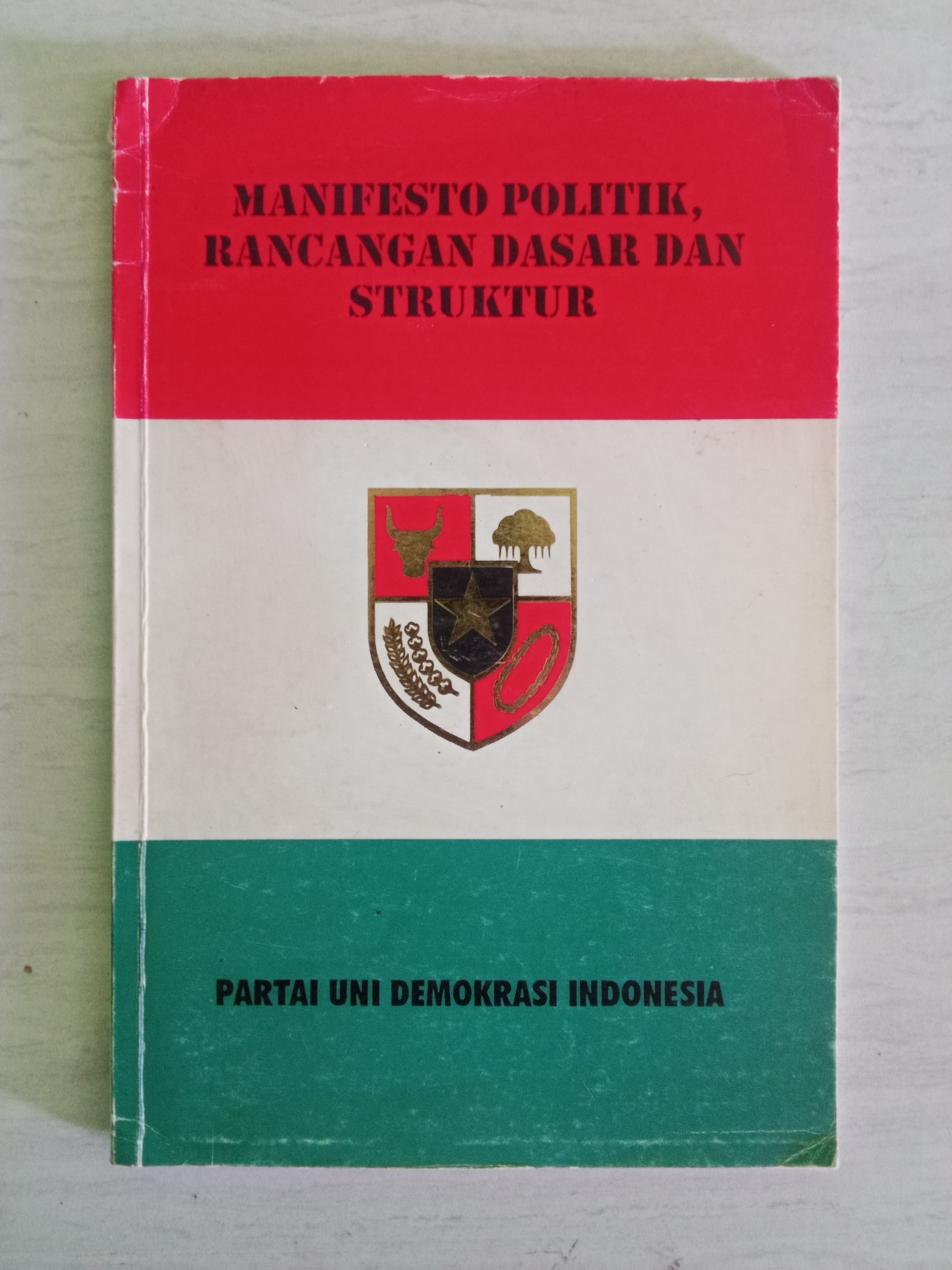
Buku Manipol PUDI

In his new party proclamation Sri Bintang, among other things, said that his party took the decision to conduct a political struggle by upholding the principles of democracy in an effort to carry out reforms to the state administration system into a state administration system whose people are sovereign, independent, and free from fear.

In his party's Manifesto, Bintang said:

"... And which upholds the constitution of the Pancasila state foundation reasonably, human rights and the principle of the rule of law towards a just and prosperous society, which is prosperous physically and mentally, and which is safe and peaceful as envisioned by the independence of the Republic of Indonesia on 17 August 1945.".

— Sri Bintang Pamungkas,

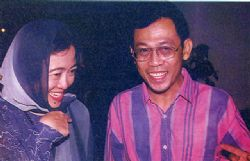
Megawati, Daughter of President Sukarno, meets Sri Bintang Pamungkas

In an intereview with Kompas on 30 April 1996, Bintang stated that the establishment of PUDI was not because he had a problem with the government. Bintang also stated that there was no problem if the government imposed the Subversion Act (anti-subversion law Law No. 11/PNPS/1963) on PUDI supporters, the PUDI party would continue even if Bintang was later imprisoned. Bintang also added that PUDI is willing to cooperate with the Indonesian Democratic Party (PDI) and the United Development Party (PPP) if the two organisations want it. Bintang hopes that PDI and PPP will make changes to become the opposition, so far they have not been able to make fundamental changes and become part of political manipulation. Regarding the violation of the formation of PUDI, Bintang explained that there is no law that regulates it. So far there are only Golkar, PDI, and PPP laws, and no party law. The right of association and assembly is clearly stated in Article 28 of the 1945 Constitution. The realisation of the three political organisations is only a national consensus that can change at any time according to prevailing conditions. He also stated that the establishment of a new party no longer needs government legitimacy because legitimacy is only needed from the people as a first step.

Despite intending to be in opposition, PUDI vice-chairman, Julius Usman, emphasised that the founding of PUDI stemmed from the White Group movement, (known commonly as Golput since 1971), and will be following the policy of abstentionism.

=== Government attempt at suppression ===
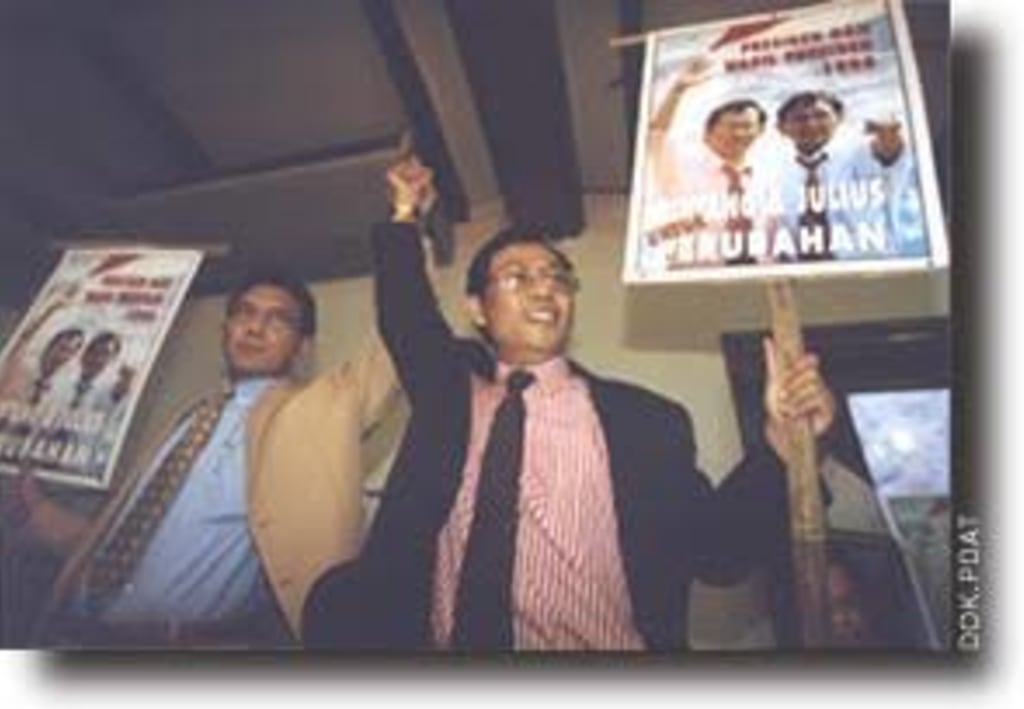
Sri Bintang Pamungkas and Julius Usman, campaigning to replace President Suharto and Vice-president Habibie

In 1996, PUDI began to wage a political struggle. On the same day that PUDI was announced as officially established by Bintang, the government did not recognise the legitimacy of PUDI. Minister of Home Affairs, Yogie SM, through his spokesperson, Head of the Public Relations Bureau of the Ministry of Home Affairs, HSA Yusacc stressed that the government did not recognise new political parties, because in accordance with Law No. III /1985 concerning political parties and Golongan Karya, only two political parties were recognised, namely the PPP and PDI and one group, Golongan Karya (Golkar). Outside the two political parties and Golkar, no party was recognised. As pressed by President Suharto.

Though, former member of the House of Representatives who is a member of the National Commission on Human Rights, Marzuki Darusman sees Sri Bintang Pamungkas establishing a new party as legitimate. As existing legislation during the New Order, namely in the political party law, it is not expressly regulated and there is no stated prohibition on establishing or forming a new party. Marzuki saw that if the new party established by Bintang was linked to the Election Law, it would be contradictory because the Election Law clearly listed three Organisations Participating in Elections (OPP), namely two political parties (PPP-PDI) and Golkar.

After the birth of KIPP (Independent Election Monitoring Committee) some time ago, the emergence of PUDI was a sign to the New Order government that the political situation in Indonesia was changing. In a Ministerial Coordination Meeting on Politics and Security chaired by the Coordinating Minister for Politics, Law and Security, Susilo Suhardiman on 30 May 1996, the issue of the formation of the PUDI party was discussed. Several officials attended the meeting, including the Minister of Home Affairs, Minister of Foreign Affairs, Minister of Justice, Minister of Information, Minister of State Secretary, Commander of ABRI, Attorney General and Head of the State Intelligence Coordinating Agency. Meanwhile, political organisations and mass organisations in Indonesia also discussed the establishment of PUDI as well as a number of foreign embassies in Jakarta. The birth of PUDI have been detrimental to the political system and government that Suharto had spent 30 years building together with ABRI, the bureaucracy, Golkar and the conglomerate. Therefore, it was not surprising that after the Polkam meeting, the authorities issued strong warnings and threats on storming PUDI affiliated structures by the military, to even jailing PUDI members. Many members of the Indonesian Government rejected PUDI as a political party in Indonesia.

== Policies ==
According to PUDI, there are six pillars that must be implemented to realise a New Indonesia. Firstly, direct election of the president and vice president by the people; secondly, full regional autonomy at the provincial level within the framework of a unitary state; thirdly, a reshuffle of the MPR both in terms of function and composition, which means that the MPR no longer elects the president and makes the GBHN; fourthly, revoking the ABRI Dwifungsi; fifthly, placing the highest place not only in the law, but in the articles of the Constitution, and sixthly, amending the 1945 Constitution. PUDI claimed to have a religious democracy ideology, which recognized the sovereignty of God and upheld moral values. PUDI also acknowledged Pancasila as the state foundation, not the state ideology.

== General elections ==
Whilst the party was formed early on, Bintang emphasised that PUDI did not want to participate, register with the Ministry of Home Affairs, nor recognize the 1997 legislative elections and the reelection of Suharto. After Suharto's Fall, The party participated in the 1999 legislative election with serial ballot number 36. The party received 140,980 votes or 0.13% of the total votes. The party did not win any seats in the House of Representatives.

== Election results ==
=== People's Representative Council ===
Election	Party leader	Votes	% of votes	Seats
1999	Sri Bintang Pamungkas	140,980	0.13%	0 / 462

== Structure ==
=== Chairperson ===
- Sri Bintang Pamukas (1996)

=== Vice-chairperson ===
- Julius Usman (from Angkatan 66)

=== General Secretary ===
- Saleh Abdullah (NGO Coordinatus for INFIGHT (Indonesian Front for Defence of Human Rights) in 1990
- Husni Akbar Lubis (1996)

=== Others ===
Then in the ranks of PUDI members are Yoppy Lasut (former journalist of Sinar Harapan and Indonesia Raya), Sunardi SH (Chairman of the Marhaen People's Movement), Saut Sirait (HKBP activist), Jimmy Alfons, Beathor Suryadi (NGO Pijar). Apart from them, Bintang also mentioned the names of HM Sanusi, HJ Princen and Subiando Sastrosatomo.
