= Indonesian Trade Union Confederation =

National trade union center

The Indonesian Trade Union Confederation (Indonesian: Konfederasi Serikat Pekerja Indonesia), commonly known as the KSPI, is one of the major national trade union centers in Indonesia. It was founded on November 28, 2003, through a merger of several different unions that were all affiliated with the international trade union movement at that time, including the Federation of Indonesian Metal Workers Unions (FSPMI), the Indonesian Railway Workers Union (SPKA), and the Federation of Indonesian Chemical, Energy and Mine Workers Unions (FSP KEP). The KSPI has its headquarters in Jakarta, Indonesia, and represents approximately 2.9 million workers across various industrial sectors such as manufacturing, mining, transportation, and the public sector. Its current chairman is Rustam Aksan, who succeeded the prominent and often outspoken labour leader Said Iqbal. The confederation is a recognized affiliate of the International Trade Union Confederation (ITUC), which is a major global federation of trade unions, and it also maintains affiliations with various Global Union Federations relevant to its member industries.

Political and Advocacy Role

The KSPI is an active and vocal advocate for workers' rights in Indonesia, focusing on issues such as a national minimum wage, social security, the elimination of outsourcing practices, and workplace safety. It often collaborates with other large Indonesian union confederations, such as the KSBSI and the KSPSI, on nationwide campaigns, forming a powerful, albeit sometimes fragmented, labour bloc. A significant part of the KSPI's recent activity has focused on opposing the controversial Omnibus Law on Job Creation (Undang-Undang Cipta Kerja). Union leaders, including KSPI's president, have argued that this law harms Indonesian workers by reducing severance pay, minimizing environmental protections, and decentralizing wage-setting policies, and have called for it to be repealed. The confederation has organized and led numerous large-scale strikes and demonstrations since the law's passage in 2020, mobilizing hundreds of thousands of workers in protest actions across major Indonesian cities.

Together with other union groups, the KSPI has been involved in developing a formal roadmap for labour law reform in Indonesia. This effort is in line with recommendations from the International Labour Organization (ILO) to ensure the country's laws comply with international labour standards, particularly the ILO's eight fundamental conventions on freedom of association, collective bargaining, and the elimination of forced labour and child labour. The KSPI has also participated in broader social advocacy. In 2023, it joined an alliance with five other union confederations to propose improvements to the Mother and Child Welfare Bill. Their proposals included support for longer maternity and paternity leave, affordable childcare for workers, and the creation of decent work for care workers, framing these demands as essential for supporting working families and promoting gender equality in the workforce.

Political Engagement and Internal Dynamics

The KSPI, under the previous leadership of Said Iqbal, has also ventured directly into the political arena. It played a key role in the re-emergence of the Labour Party (Partai Buruh) for the 2024 Indonesian general election. This move was an attempt to unite different parts of the labour movement under a single political banner to directly influence legislation and national policy from within the government. However, the party's electoral performance was weaker than expected, failing to meet the parliamentary threshold and highlighting the challenges of achieving unity among Indonesian workers and translating industrial muscle into electoral success.

The activities of the KSPI and other major confederations sometimes reveal different approaches within the Indonesian labour movement. For instance, during a May Day celebration in 2025, the KSPI was part of a large, official rally at Jakarta's National Monument (Monas) that was attended by the Indonesian President, signaling a strategy of dialogue and engagement with the government. Meanwhile, other, more protest-oriented unions like the Indonesian People's Faction (FRI) and the National Labour Union (SPN) held a separate, more critical demonstration at the House of Representatives (DPR), creating a visible contrast between engagement and confrontation. This shows the ongoing discussions within the movement about the most effective ways to fight for workers' interests. Furthermore, the KSPI's internal dynamics are shaped by its structure as a confederation of powerful sectoral unions, which can sometimes lead to differing priorities between its constituent members, such as those in the metal sector versus those in the chemical and energy sectors.
