= Labour Party (Indonesia, 2021) =

Labour Party Partai Buruh
- President: Said Iqbal
- General-Secretary: Ferri Nuzarli
- Founded: 5 October 2021; 4 years ago
- Preceded by: Labour Party
- Headquarters: Jl. H. Bokir bin Dji'un No. 11, Kel. Dukuh, Kec. Kramat Jati, Jakarta Timur, Jakarta, 13550
- Youth wing: Suara Muda Kelas Pekerja (Working Class Youth Voice)
- Women's wing: Suara Marsinah (Marsinah's Voice)
- Ideology: Pancasila; Secularism; Social democracy Democratic socialism Left-wing populism Labourism; Civic nationalism Welfare state Progressivism
- Political position: Centre-left to left-wing
- National affiliation: Advanced Indonesia Coalition Plus (2024–)
- Slogan: Kami Adalah Kelas Pekerja (We Are the Working Class); Negara Sejahtera (Welfare State)
- DPR: 0 / 580
- DPRD I: 0 / 2,372
- DPRD II: 11 / 17,510

Website
- partaiburuh.or.id

The Labour Party (Indonesian: Partai Buruh) is a political party in Indonesia founded on 5 October 2021. The party was reformed from and is a continuation of the defunct 1998 Labour Party founded by Muchtar Pakpahan. The party formed after the 4th Labour Party congress on 4–5 October in Jakarta.

== History ==
In the aftermath of the passage of the Omnibus Law on Job Creation (Law No. 11/2020) by the People's Representative Council, many Indonesian labour unions felt disillusioned with the new law, which they deemed threatening to the labourers' and workers' rights and protections that they enjoyed prior to its passage. During the 4th Congress of the Labour Party, Said Iqbal, Chairman of the KSPI and sole candidate to be Chairman of the Labour Party, said that the passage of the law was a defeat for Indonesian labour unions. He realized that pressure tactics through using labour unions and mass organizations as pressure groups against government, general strike tactics, and employment of political demonstrations in Indonesia omnibus law protests were useless to stop the passage of the law. Due to this, he now seeks a democratic way to take down the law, by advancing pro-labour union and pro-worker politicians to join parliament.

At the Congress, Said Iqbal was elected Chairman of the Labour Party. In December 2022, The Labour Party has successfully met the administrative and actual verification requirements of the KPU RI, thus being declared eligible to participate in the 2024 elections. In 2024, the party fielded 580 candidates for the House of Representatives (DPR), 1,888 candidates for provincial houses, and around 13,500 candidates for regional houses in the 2024 Indonesian general election, presenting candidates which, according to Secretary-General Ferri Nuzarli, are representatives of the Indonesian working class: labourers, farmers, and fishermen, among others. He further confirmed that the party is committed to not field "celebrities or elites" for the elections. Due to their grassroots origins, legislative candidates running from the party tend to focus on personal outreach to local communities and factories, under the 'Sasapa' (Salam satu pabrik, Factory Greeting) and 'Sasatu' (Salam satu pintu, Door Greeting) programmes.

The party in 2024 failed to pass the parliamentary threshold of 4 percent of votes, and did not qualify for a seat in the House of Representatives. The party won several seats in several local legislatures, including in Bekasi Regency where it won two seats. Party member Asep Surya Atmaja was elected vice regent of Bekasi in the 2024 regency election.

== Founding organisations ==
The 2021 Labour Party was formed through the merging of the Labour Party and 10 other founding organizations:

1. 1998 Labour Party (political arm of Confederation of All Indonesia Labor Unions, Indonesian: Konfederasi Serikat Buruh Seluruh Indonesia, KSBSI)
2. Confederation of Indonesian Prosperous Laborers Unions (Indonesian: Konfederasi Serikat Buruh Sejahtera Indonesia, KSBSI)
3. Confederation of Indonesian Workers Unions (Indonesian: Konfederasi Serikat Pekerja Indonesia, KSPI)
4. Federation of Indonesian Metal Workers Unions (Indonesian: Federasi Serikat Pekerja Metal Indonesia, FSPMI)
5. Indonesian Farmer Union (Indonesian: Serikat Petani Indonesia, SPI)
6. Indonesian People Organization (Indonesian: Organisasi Rakyat Indonesia)
7. Confederation of Indonesian Labour Union(Indonesian: Konfederasi Persatuan Buruh Indonesia, KPBI)
8. Federation of Chemical, Energy, and Mining Labour Unions (Indonesian: Federasi Serikat Pekerja Kimia Energi Pertambangan, FSP KEP)
9. Federation of Pharmacy and Health Labour Unions-Reformation (Indonesian: Federasi Serikat Pekerja Farmasi dan Kesehatan Reformasi, FSP Farkes-R)
10. Indonesian Forum of Private Educators and Honorary Employees (Indonesian: Forum Pendidik dan Tenaga Honorer Swasta Indonesia, FTPHSI)
11. Indonesian Women Movement (Indonesian: Gerakan Perempuan Indonesia)

Beyond these founding 11 organizations, more than 50 Indonesian Labour unions also expressed their support for the party, according to Said Iqbal.

== Political identities ==
=== Ideology and political positions ===
The party has espoused a somewhat stronger left-wing foundation compared to the original Labour Party and is described as "pro-labourer and pro-worker". Despite that, Chairman Said Iqbal has not made clear if the party really follows left-wing politics, despite citing social democracy as the party ideology. To add much further confusion, Said Iqbal himself was also formerly a right-wing activist and politician from the Prosperous Justice Party. Such an unclear position has also raised confusion amongst Indonesian political experts about the party's alignment and commitment to labourist politics.But the party believes that they would be moving towards a “welfare state” supporting pro-working class laws.

The party advocates for peace in the Gaza war, with party chairman Said Iqbal calling on the United Nations to call a halt to the conflict and the Indonesian government to send peacekeeping forces to enforce peace in Palestine.

The party published in its social media account, that they are committed to respecting and protecting human rights for all people, regardless of ethnicities, adat, race, religion, including sexual orientations, and ensuring that every individual has the right to be respected, protected and treated equally before the law without discrimination.

=== Program and policies ===
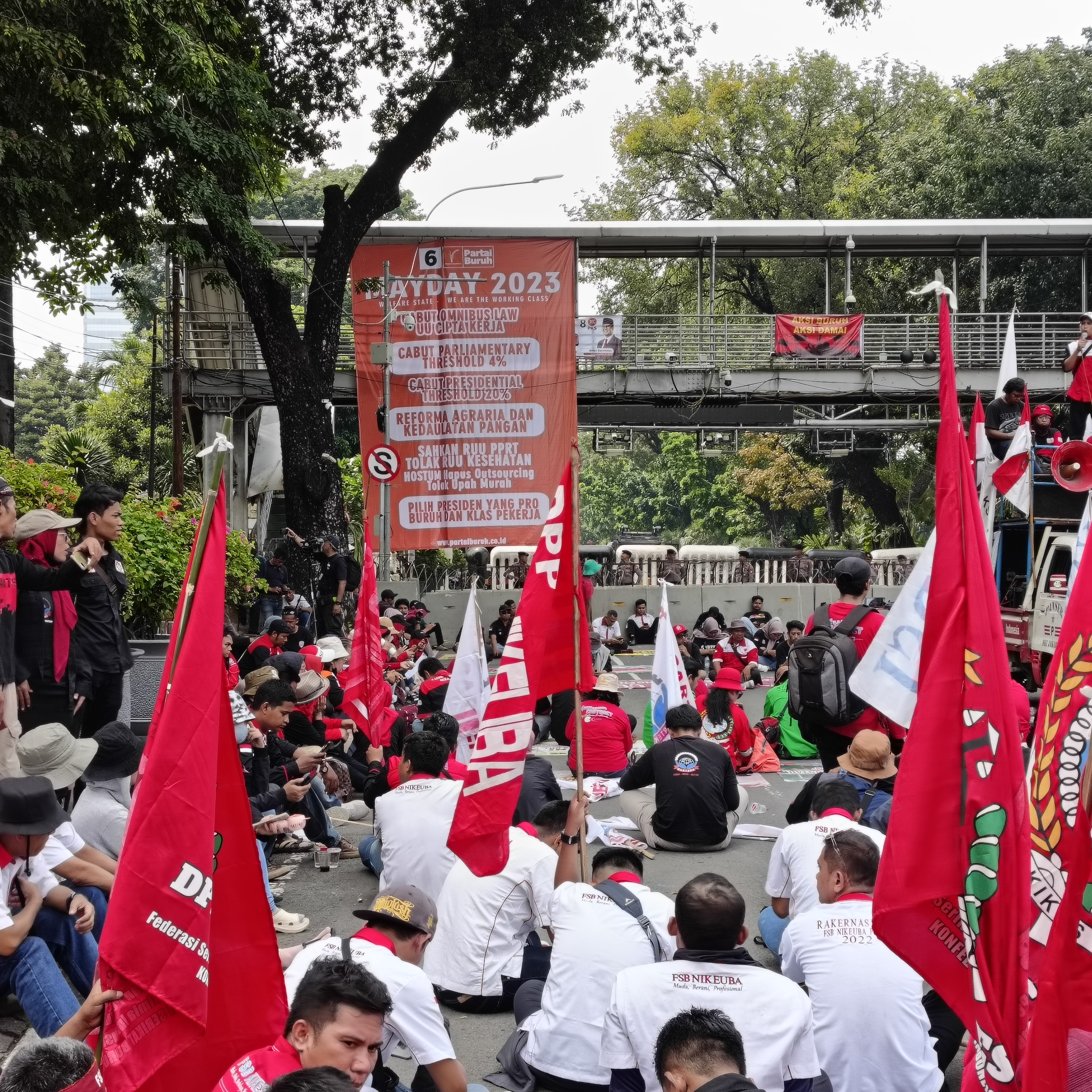
One of the demands of the Labor Party during Indonesia's Labour Day in 2023

The party program proposes the following changes:

1. Repeal of the Law No. 11/2020.
2. Long-term pro-laborer and pro-worker rights struggle and activism.
3. Formation of pro-laborer and pro-worker laws, including:
  - More subsidy programs to people.
  - Prohibition of outsourcing.
  - Putting an end to the current Indonesian employing contracting system with unlimited renewal.
  - Pushing laws providing adequate severance pay.
  - Humane working hours.
  - Protection of wages.
  - Undoing/repealing laws granting corporation for simplified worker layoffs.
  - Advocacy of putting menstrual and birthing leave into the laws.
4. Formation of pro-farmer laws, including:
  - Greater farmer rights and exclusivity
  - Agrarian reform.
  - Food sovereignty.

== Responses ==
Both parties from the ruling and opposition side of the current Joko Widodo administration congratulated members on the formation of the party, with the Great Indonesia Movement Party congratulating the party formation from the side of the ruling coalition and the Prosperous Justice Party congratulating the party formation from the opposition side. Many political experts see the party as having the potential to grow quickly to having a considerable grassroot basis amongst labourers, workers, farmers, fishermen, educators, and honorary employees. Despite that, experts also said that the new party has a challenge in consolidating all labour movements in Indonesia as their source of power, particularly because the current large parties in Indonesia also have their own affiliated labour unions and mass organizations which are much larger and more established compared to the new party. Additionally, labour movements in Indonesia are currently fragmented and lack strong figures to unite all laborers and workers. In the political history of Indonesia, there have been numerous labour-based parties formed since the Reformasi period but all the parties performed poorly and lacked strong figures, causing their impact to be negligible.

Not all labour unions welcomed the party. The oldest Indonesian labour union, the Confederation of All Indonesian Workers' Unions (Indonesian: Konfederasi Serikat Pekerja Seluruh Indonesia, KSPSI) did not respond well to the formation of the party and did not join the party. The leader of the KSPSI, Elly Rosita Silaban, explained that the conditions which labourist politics requires to grow are not met in Indonesia due to the lack of three things: (1) Low trade union density, despite the high number of labourers and workers. In Indonesia, according to the KSPSI's 2021 data, out of 127 million Indonesian labourers and workers, only 2.7 million are registered labourers and workers, and those 2.7 million labourers and workers are also scattered across one hundred specialized labour unions. (2) No single labour confederation as an umbrella organization to channel all labour and focus it to one point. (3) The number of parties in Indonesia which greatly scatters and dilutes the labourers' voice.

== Election results ==
=== Presidential election results ===
Election	Ballot number	Candidate	Running mate	1st round (Total votes)	Share of votes	Outcome	2nd round (Total votes)	Share of votes	Outcome
2024	Neutral	Neutral							

Note: Bold text suggests the party's member

=== Legislative election results ===
Election	Ballot number	Leader	Seats		Total votes	Share of votes	Status
Election	Ballot number	Leader	No.	±	Total votes	Share of votes	Status
2024	6	Said Iqbal	0 / 580		972,898	0.64%	Coalition supply

Election results for Regency/City Regional Houses of Representatives
Election	City/Regency	Seats won	Status	Reference
2024	West Tulang Bawang	1 / 35	Governing coalition	
2024	Bekasi Regency	2 / 55	Governing coalition	
2024	Ambon	1 / 35	Opposition	
2024	Sorong	1 / 30	Governing coalition	
2024	Manokwari Regency	1 / 30	Governing coalition	
2024	Mamberamo Raya Regency	1 / 30	Opposition	
2024	Lanny Jaya Regency	1 / 30	Governing coalition	
2024	Tolikara Regency	1 / 30	Governing coalition	
2024	Yalimo Regency	1 / 30	Governing coalition	
2024	Paniai Regency	1 / 25	Opposition	
