= Muchtar Pakpahan =

Indonesian labor leader (1953–2021)

Muchtar Pakpahan S.H., M.A., Dr., Prof.
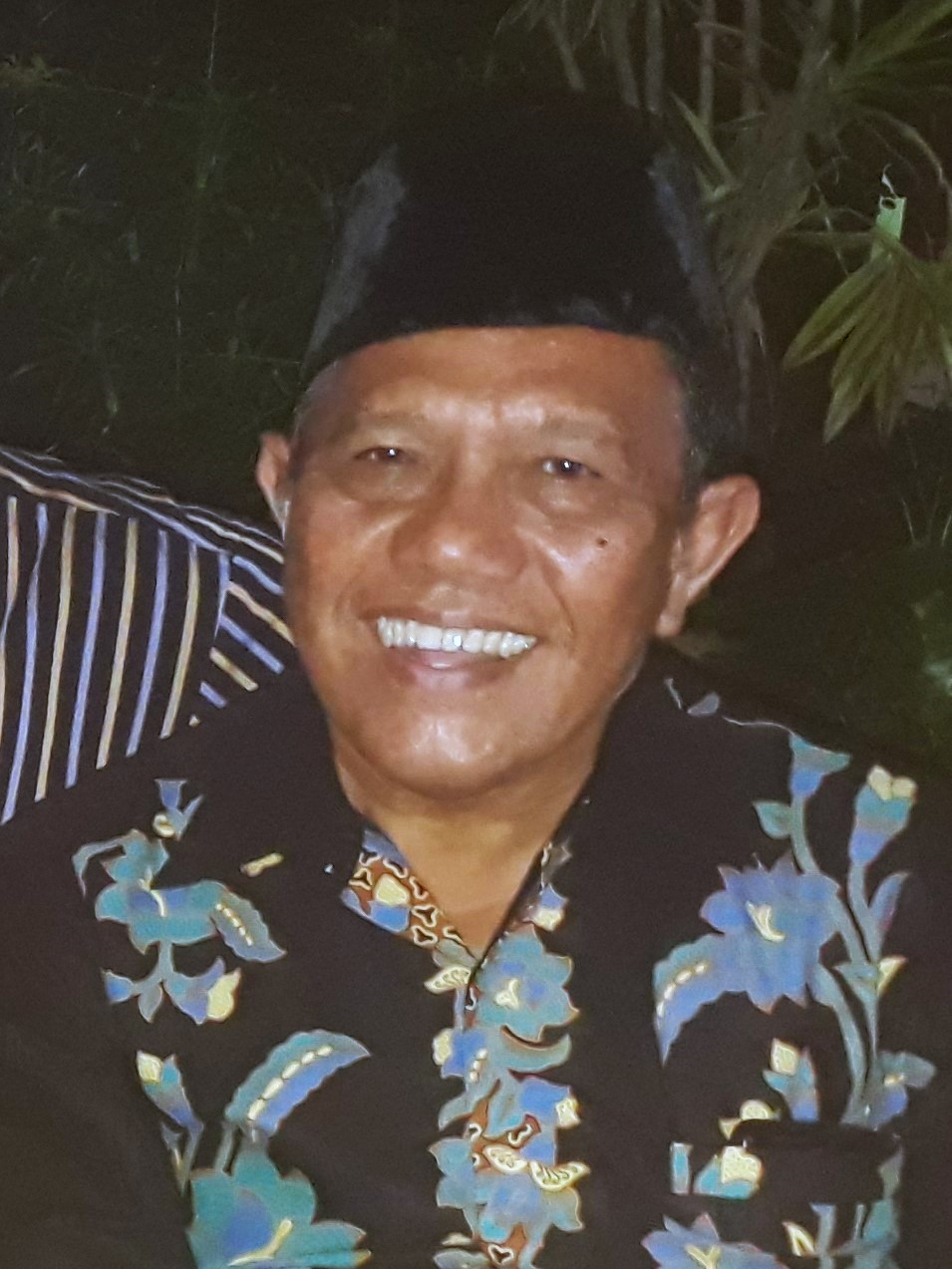

Chairman of Labour Party
- In office 1999 – February 2010
- President: Megawati Sukarnoputri; Susilo Bambang Yudhoyono

Chairman of Indonesian Workers Welfare Union
- In office 1992–2003
- In office 2012 – 21 March 2021
- President: Soeharto; Bacharuddin Jusuf Habibie; Abdurrahman Wahid; Megawati Sukarnoputri; Susilo Bambang Yudhoyono; Joko Widodo

Vice President of World Confederation of Labor
- In office 2001–2005

Personal details
- Born: 21 December 1953 Bah Jambi II, Tanah Jawa, Simalungun, North Sumatra, Indonesia
- Died: 21 March 2021 (aged 67) Jakarta, Indonesia
- Party: Labour Party (1998–2010)
- Spouse(s): Rosintan Marpaung, S.Si. (m. 1979)
- Children: Binsar Jonathan Pakpahan; Johanes Darta Pakpahan; Ruth Damai Hati Pakpahan
- Parents: Sutan Johan Pakpahan (father); Victoria Silalahi (mother)
- Education: University of North Sumatra (S.H.); University of Indonesia (M.A., Dr.)
- Website: www.muchtarpakpahan.com

Muchtar Pakpahan (21 December 1953 – 21 March 2021) was an Indonesian labor leader who founded the first independent trade union in Indonesia. Pakpahan was active as a lawyer at Muchtar Pakpahan & Associates Law Firm and taught at the law faculty of the Indonesian Christian University (UKI).

== Early life ==
Pakpahan was born on 21 December 1953, in Bah Jambi village, Tanah Jawa, Simalungun, as the son of Sutan Johan Pakpahan and Victoria Silalahi. His father was a farm laborer and a member of the Peasants Front of Indonesia. His father died when he was eleven years old, while his mother died when he was eighteen years old. His parents' deaths made him and his brothers and sisters orphans, and he had to work as a pedicab driver and as a paperboy during his studies in high school.

After Muchtar Pakpahan finished high school, he continued his studies at the Medical Faculty of the University of North Sumatra. However, according to Pakpahan, he decided to move into the law faculty following the Malari incident. He stated that he was inspired by activists, such as Hariman Siregar, Muslim Tampubolon, Nelson Parapat, and Sufri Helmi Tanjung, who were highly involved in the movement. He became a member of the student senate of his university and became a board member of the Medan branch of the Indonesian Christian Student Movement. He graduated from the university in 1978.

After obtaining his Bachelor of Law (Sarjana Hukum/S.H.) degree, he obtained his Master of Arts in Social and Political Science (M.A.) from the University of Indonesia in 1989, and a Doctorate in Constitutional Law from the University of Indonesia in 1993. He was a faculty member and law professor at Indonesia Christian University.

== Career as a lawyer ==
Following his graduation from the university, Pakpahan opened a law office in Medan. Most of his clients were relatively powerless and poor people, such as laborers and farmers. He rarely won the cases when defending them, due to the intimidation directed at him including accusations that he was a communist.

Several prominent cases that he handled included the Inalum Asahan Project (1978–1982), the Deli Match Factory in Medan, the Mount Balak National Forest in Lampung, the firing of 2800 Jakarta Passenger Transport drivers, the sales ban imposed on street vendors in Jakarta, the Kedung Ombo case, and the Kampung Sawah burning.

== Indonesian Workers Welfare Union ==
After working as a lawyer for several decades, Pakpahan went on to form the Indonesian Workers Welfare Union (Serikat Buruh Sejahtera Indonesia, SBSI) in May 1992. Before the establishment of the SBSI, the government-backed All Indonesian Workers Union (Serikat Pekerja Seluruh Indonesia, SPSI) was the only legal trade union at that time. However, SPSI was often criticized for its indifference to the persecution of labor workers. Pakpahan was then elected the chairman of SBSI.

Since its founding, the organization has twice attempted to register itself as a legal trade union: first on 28 October 1992 and second on 10 August 1993. In the first instance, no action was taken on the union's application, and in the second, an official from the Department of Home Affairs refused to accept the SBSI's documentation.

In its early days, the organization focused mainly on criticizing the organization system of SPSI and demanding a free trade union. In December 1992, the SBSI and eight other NGOs formed the Labor Solidarity Forum. In the same month, the forum discussed the SPSI, which was also attended by Pakpahan. In the discussion, Pakpahan criticized the monopoly enjoyed by SPSI. On 11 December of the same month, Pakpahan led an SBSI delegation to the People's Consultative Assembly and proposed several changes relating to workers' welfare and working conditions. The delegation was received by members of the People's Consultative Assembly from the Indonesian Democratic Party.

=== Workers strike and first arrest ===
On 3 February 1994, Pakpahan delivered a public letter to the Minister of Labor at that time, Abdul Latief, and put forward four demands regarding labor welfare. He demanded to remove restrictions on labor unions by repealing the Minister of Labor Decree No. 1 of 1994, confirming the basic income of laborers to 173.500 rupiahs/month or 7.000 rupiahs/day, approving the existence of SBSI as a legal trade union, and that all of these demands shall be fulfilled before 1 April 1994. He also encouraged workers all over Indonesia to conduct a strike on 11 February from 08.00 to 09.00.

In response to his letter, regional military commanders all over Indonesia conducted precautions to prevent any strikes. The Diponegoro (Central Java) military commander, Major-General Soeyono, went to industrial plants to conduct dialogues with workers and laborers. The Jaya (Jakarta) military commander, Major-General Abdullah Mahmud Hendropriyono, collected data and intelligence on workers and concluded that the strike would not threaten the productivity of factories. He also doubted whether the workers would comply with Pakpahan's invitation to conduct a workers' strike. Abdul Latief himself responded to the letter, stating that SBSI is not a workers' union and that the methods of workers' strike were outdated.

Several days after the letter was published, Pakpahan and a colleague from SBSI were arrested by the Semarang police on the grounds of subversion and hate speech. He was arrested after attending an SBSI event, in which the police found folders containing posters relating to the strike. His arrest was criticized by Amnesty International, Indonesian Legal Aid Foundation, Human Rights Defenders Institute, Infight, and Women's Solidarity. His arrest was eventually canceled after a month of investigation on 12 February 1994.

According to Kompas, Pakpahan's encouragement of workers' strikes received little interest. Although SBSI claimed that around three-quarters of a million workers joined the strike, the only workers' strike during that period occurred at the Tyfountex Factory in Solo, with 7000 workers participating. The workers demanded the rise of minimum wage from 2,500 rupiahs to 3,800 rupiahs.

=== Medan riots and second arrest ===
On 16 April, Pakpahan went to Semarang. Two days after his arrival, a series of workers strikes and riots occurred all over Java and Sumatra. About ten strikes occurred at the Famoes Shoes Factory, Simoplas, Damatex and Sinar Pantja Daya, with the longest one being at the Famoes Shoes Factory for more than two days.

The most significant strike occurred in Medan, North Sumatra, on 14 April, with between 6 (Note: Estimate from Kompas newspaper.) and 20 (Note: Estimate from the government and the armed forces.) thousand workers from all over the province joining the strike. Initially, the strike was a peaceful one, with some of the workers even requesting permission from their bosses to join the demonstration. However, the demonstration soon turned violent after the Governor of North Sumatra, Raja Inal Siregar, only send his assistant to meet with the protesters. The riots continued for about a month and spread to other regions in the province, such as in Tanjung Morawa and Pematang Siantar. During the riots, a factory owner named Yuri Kristianto was killed after being beaten by an angry mob. A worker, named Rusli, died during the protests. Pakpahan himself oversaw the giving of compensation from the Industri Karet Deli Company—Rusli's company—to his widow. As of 22 April, an estimated 33 offices and factories, 43 cars, 4 motorcycles, 9 computers, 4 televisions, and 2 antennas were either broken or destroyed during the riots.

Immediately after the riots, the Chief of Staff of the Armed Forces Lt. Gen. Herman Mantiri held a press conference, in which he blamed the SBSI for inciting riots in North Sumatra. Mantiri then blamed Amosi Telaumbanua, the SBSI leader in North Sumatra, and Muchtar Pakpahan as the most responsible person for the riots. The Commander of the Armed Forces, General Feisal Tanjung, stated that the riots in North Sumatra were a communist-ridden act of subversion. The Coordinating Minister for Political Affairs and Security, Susilo Sudarman, also remarked that the demands of the workers were absurd, such as the minimum wage raise to 7,000 rupiahs.

About more than 100 people who were alleged to be involved in the riots were arrested by the police. However, Amosi fled North Sumatra, and he was arrested later on. Muchtar was declared as a suspect in the case on 2 June and he was investigated for about a day since 14 June. He was tried on charges of subversion at the Medan Court on 7 November. The trial was criticized by Bill Jordan, general secretary of the International Confederation of Free Trade Unions, who stated that the trial was a "patently trumped up" and that it was a "further attempt by the Indonesian government to muzzle independent trade-union activity". His trial was observed by Guy Ryder, who was sent by International Confederation of Free Trade Unions. Muchtar was deemed guilty and was sentenced to jail for three years. His arrest was criticized by the Indonesian Legal Aid Foundation (Yayasan Lembaga Bantuan Hukum Indonesia, YLBHI), who stated that the state misused criminal codes on social political affairs.

He was detained in the Tanjung Gusta prison. About five months into his sentence, he criticized the inadequate conditions of the prison and attempted to sue the Minister of Justice. During his time in prison, he claimed to be dragged by the guards, stripped, and threatened to be killed. He also prayed for the repentance of Soeharto. He created about 25 songs and poems with themes varying from political situations at that time to religion.

Pakpahan was given parole on 20 May 1995. The Supreme Court of Indonesia on 29 September 1995 decided that Pakpahan was innocent, therefore freeing him unconditionally.

== Political party ==
After the fall of Suharto, Pakpahan founded the National Labour Party (PBN) and became its chairman. PBN took part in the 1999 legislative election, as one of three parties with strong labor union links. However, PBN won just 0.13 percent of votes and failed to qualify for a seat at the House of Representatives. The party was renamed and reconstituted for the 2004 election, becoming the Social Democratic Labour Party (PBSD). It won several seats at local legislatures, winning 0.56 percent of votes. For the 2004 presidential election, Pakpahan endorsed Amien Rais, although elements of PBSD including its secretary-general endorsed Megawati Sukarnoputri.

After another poor electoral showing in 2009, Pakpahan resigned from the party in February 2010.

== Personal life ==
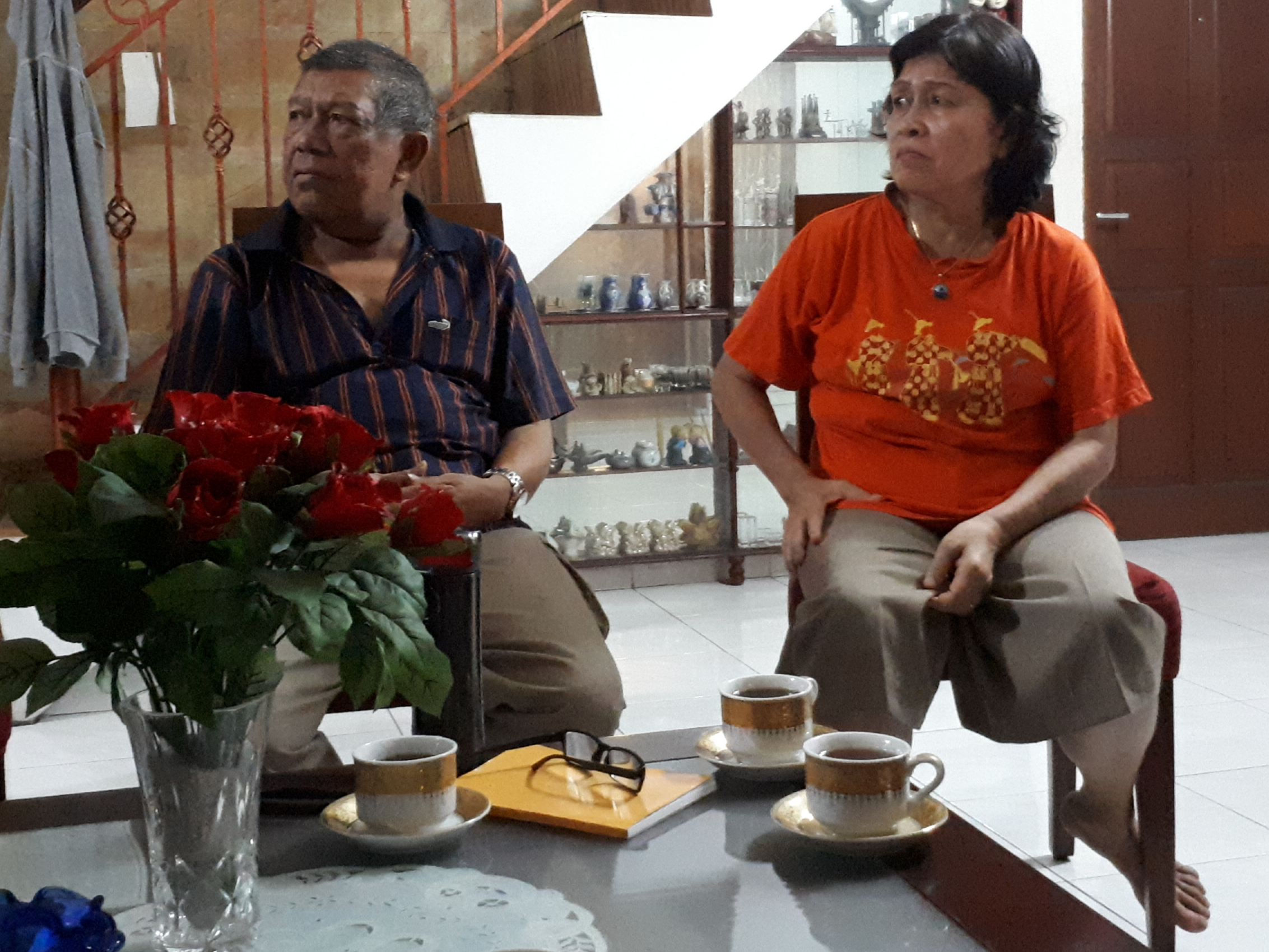
Muchtar Pakpahan and wife

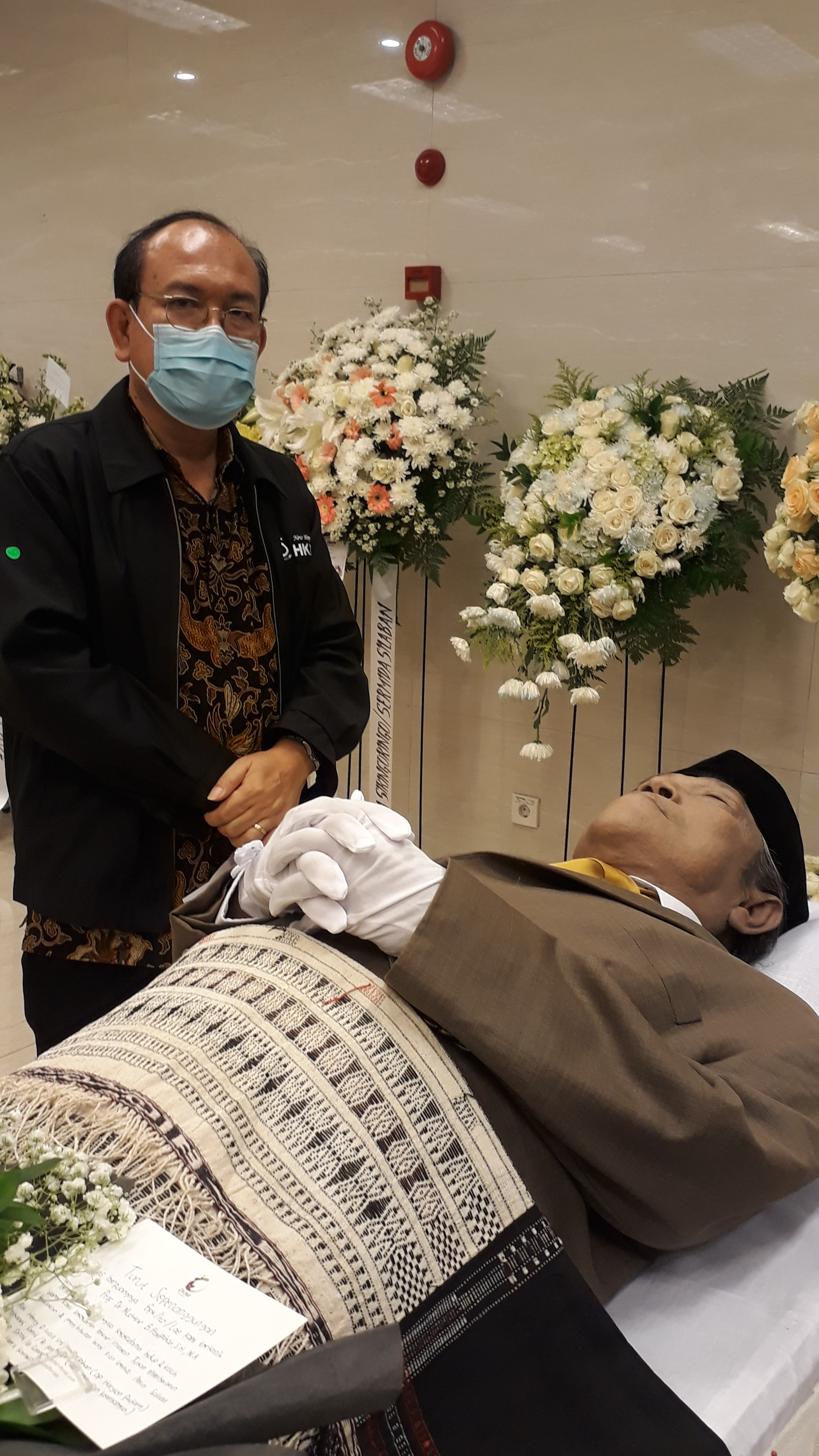
Muchtar Pakpahan's body laid out at the Gatot Subroto funeral home.

Pakpahan was married to Rosintan Marpaung, a teacher from the state high school in Jakarta and the daughter of Nicolaus Marpaung, a retired policeman, and Maria Pasaribu. They were married on 17 November 1979. The marriage resulted in one girl, Ruth Damai Hati (Iyuth) in 1985, an amateur actor, and two boys, Binsar Pakpahan, a reverend, and Johannes Darta, a lawyer.

Pakpahan had one sister, Nelly, and three brothers, Borotan Hatigoran, Bona Barita, and Batu Sonang.

Pakpahan died of cancer on 21 March 2021 in Siloam Hospital, Jakarta, at the age of 67.

Pakpahan was a Protestant and affiliated with Batak Christian Protestant Church. Despite his religion, he wore the peci, which is typically associated with Islam. This was referenced by Fahri Hamzah, deputy speaker of the Indonesia House of Representatives at that time, during an interview. His use of peci actually originated in 1994 due to his baldness during his time in prison, which led him to wear peci as a head cover. Due to his likeness to his idol, Sukarno, when wearing a peci, he continued to wear it on many occasions for the remainder of his life.
