= Indonesian Workers Welfare Union =

SBSI
- Indonesian Workers Welfare Union
- Serikat Buruh Seluruh Indonesia
- Founded: 1992
- Headquarters: Jakarta, Indonesia
- Location: Indonesia
- Members: 2.1 million
- Key people: Muchtar Pakpahan
- Affiliations: ITUC
- Website: http://ksbsi.org/

The Indonesian Workers Welfare Union (SBSI) is a national trade union centre in Indonesia. It was founded in 1992 and claims a membership of 2.1 million. SBSI was the first independent national federation to form during the Suharto dictatorship, suffering considerable state repression during this period. In 1993 its national congress was broken up by soldiers just 40 minutes into the proceedings. As well, three activists were murdered, 250 arrested, and 2,500 dismissed from employment in the first two years of its establishment.
