= Neneng Hassanah Yasin =

Indonesian politician

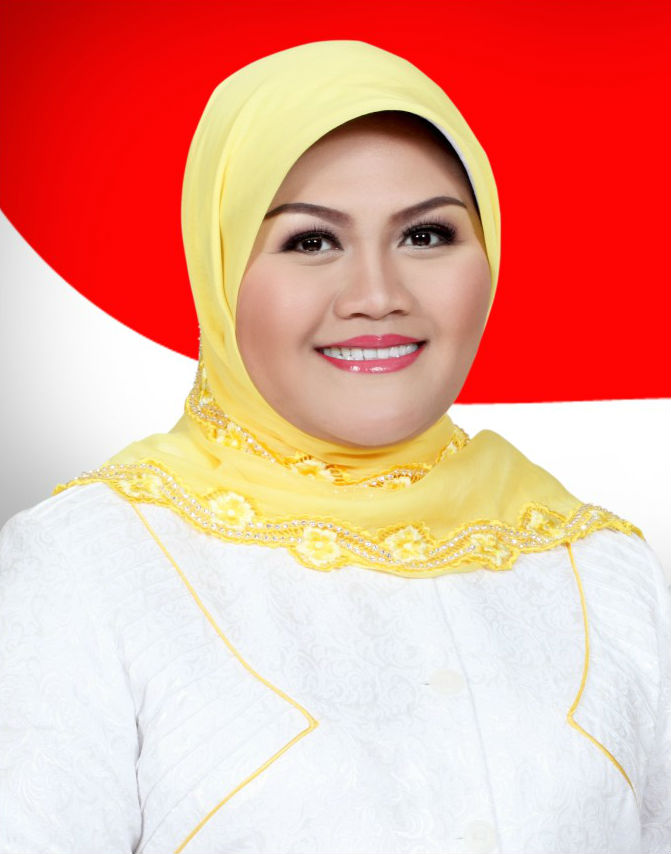

Regent of Bekasi
- In office 14 May 2012 – 18 October 2018
- Preceded by: Sa'duddin
- Succeeded by: Eka Supria Atmaja

Member of West Java Provincial Council
- In office 2009–2012

Personal details
- Born: 23 July 1980 (age 44); Karawang Regency, Indonesia
- Political party: Golkar

Neneng Hassanah Yasin (born 23 July 1980) is an Indonesian politician who was the regent of Bekasi Regency, holding that position between 2012 and 2018.

Born in Karawang, Yasin had been a member of the West Java Provincial Council before being elected as Bekasi's first female regent. In 2018, she was arrested by the Corruption Eradication Commission on charges of accepting bribery.

== Background ==
Neneng Hassanah Yasin was born on 23 July 1980 in Karawang. Her father Muhammad Yasin (d. 2012) was a wealthy rice merchant. After graduating from high school in Bogor, Yasin studied medicine at YARSI University.

=== Family ===
She is married to Almaida Rosa Putra and has three children, in addition to one more in pregnancy as of October 2018.

== Career ==
Yasin was elected into the West Java Provincial Council in the 2009 legislative election. She later ran in Bekasi's local election in 2012 and won, and was sworn in as regent on 14 May 2012. She was the first female regent in Bekasi.

During the 2017 Bekasi election, she faced Gerindra and PKS-backed pair of Sa'duddin and Ahmad Dhani, winning the five-candidate race with 471,585 votes (39.28%).

In 2013, Yasin was involved in the sealing of a church and the dismantlement of another, citing permit issues, with representatives from the churches accusing her of religious discrimination and noting that the sealed church had permits.

She joined Joko Widodo's campaign team for the 2019 Indonesian presidential election, though she was removed from the organization's structure following her arrest in 2018.

=== Arrest ===
In 2018, Yasin was arrested for bribery allegations by the Corruption Eradication Commission (KPK). She was accused of having accepted Rp 13 billion (US$850,000) in bribes from a Lippo Group executive. Following her arrest, she was suspended from her party Golkar - in which she chaired the party's Bekasi office. Later, she handed Rp 3 billion - part of the money she received - to KPK, with the rest set to be paid in installments. She was sentenced to six years in prison on 29 May 2019.
