= 1999 Indonesian legislative election =

- 7 June 1999

462 of the 500 seats of the People's Representative Council 232 seats needed for a majority
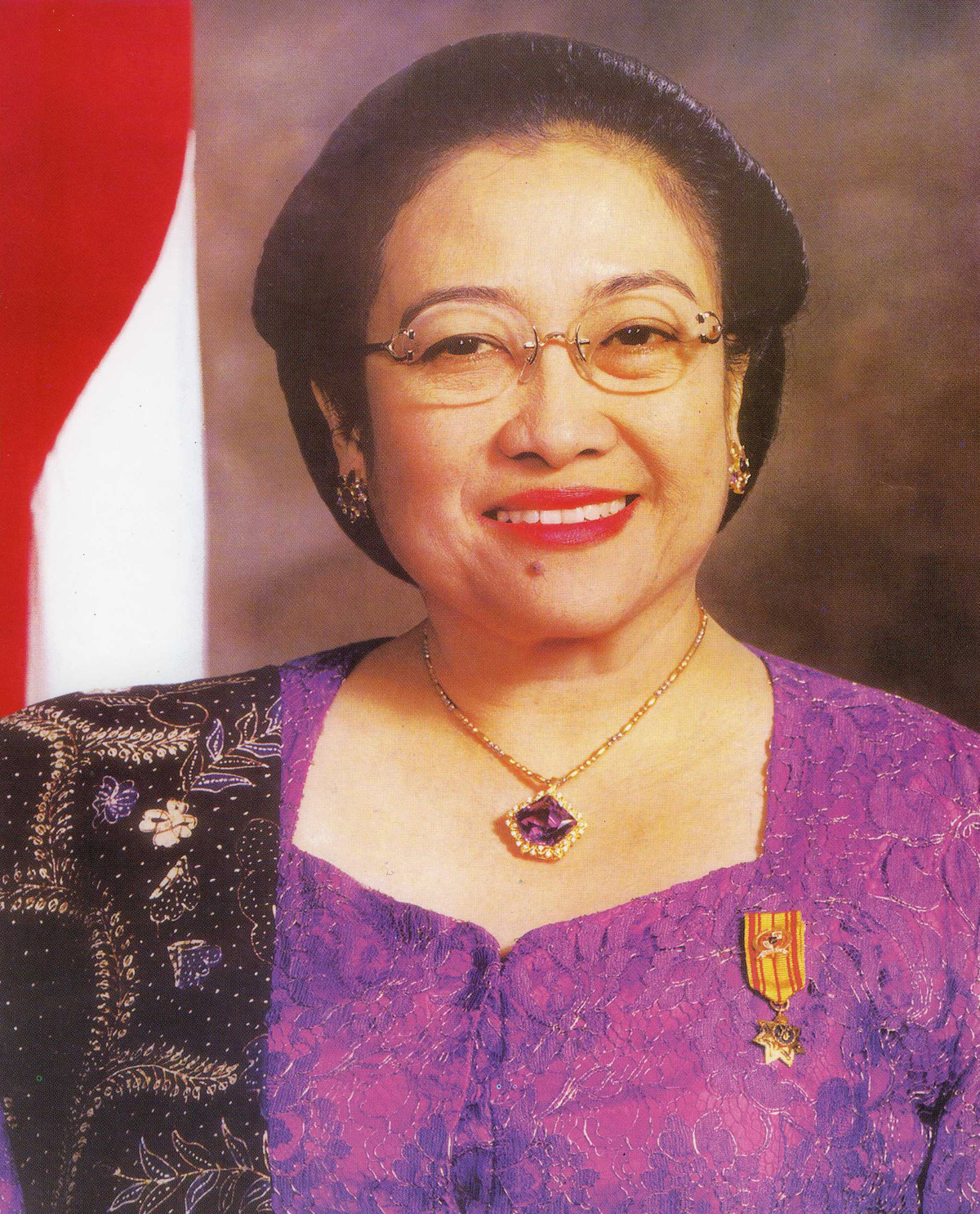

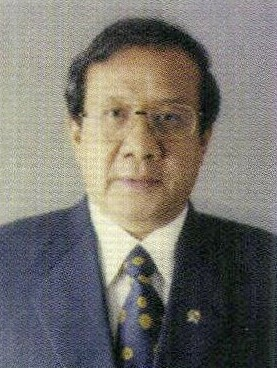

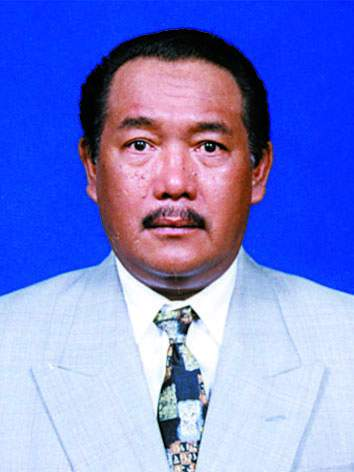

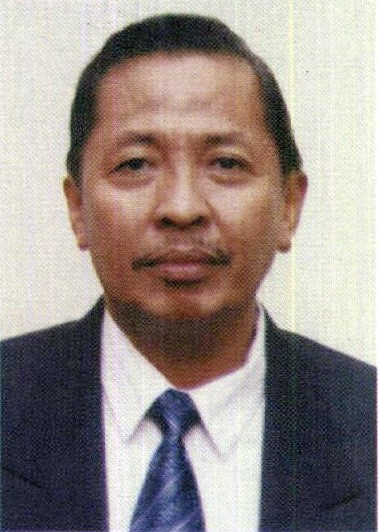

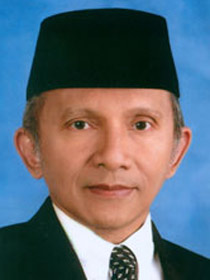

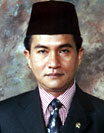
	First party	Second party	Third party
Leader	Megawati Sukarnoputri	Akbar Tanjung	Matori Abdul Djalil
Party	PDI-P	Golongan Karya	PKB
Last election	–	74.51%, 325 seats	–
Seats won	153	120	51
Seat change	New	▼205	New
Popular vote	35,689,073	23,741,749	13,336,982
Percentage	33.76%	22.46%	12.62%
Swing	New	▼50.05pp	New
	Fourth party	Fifth party	Sixth party
Leader	Hamzah Haz	Amien Rais	Yusril Ihza Mahendra
Party	PPP	PAN	PBB
Last election	22.43%, 89 seats	–	–
Seats won	58	34	13
Seat change	▼31	New	New
Popular vote	11,329,905	7,528,956	2,049,708
Percentage	10.71%	7.12%	1.94%
Swing	▼11.72pp	New	New
Leadership before election
MPR: Harmoko (Golkar)
DPR: Harmoko (Golkar)
New leadership
MPR: Amien Rais (PAN)
DPR: Akbar Tanjung (Golkar)

Early legislative elections were held in Indonesia on 7 June 1999. They were the first elections since the fall of Suharto and end of the New Order, the first free elections in Indonesia since 1955, and the first and only free legislative election held in East Timor during Indonesian provincehood. With the ending of restrictions on political activity following the fall of Suharto, a total of 48 parties contested the 462 seats up for election in the People's Representative Council. A further 38 seats were reserved for members of the armed forces.

== Background ==
Under the New Order, only two political parties forcibly merged in 1973 – Indonesian Democratic Party (PDI) and United Development Party (PPP) – plus the functional group Golkar had been allowed to participate in elections. With the start of the Reform Era, more than 100 new political parties emerged. New elections were called for 1999 and 148 parties registered with the Ministry of Justice and Human Rights. Of these, only 48 passed the selection process, overseen by intellectual Nurcholish Madjid. The elections were to be overseen by an independent General Elections Commission (KPU) of 53 members, one from each party and five government representatives.

== Electoral system ==
The system used was based on closed party-list proportional representation at the provincial level (in province-wide districts). Within each province, parties were awarded seats in proportion to their share of the vote. The East Java province had the most number of seats, with 82, while the lowest was in Bengkulu and East Timor with four each.

== Campaign ==
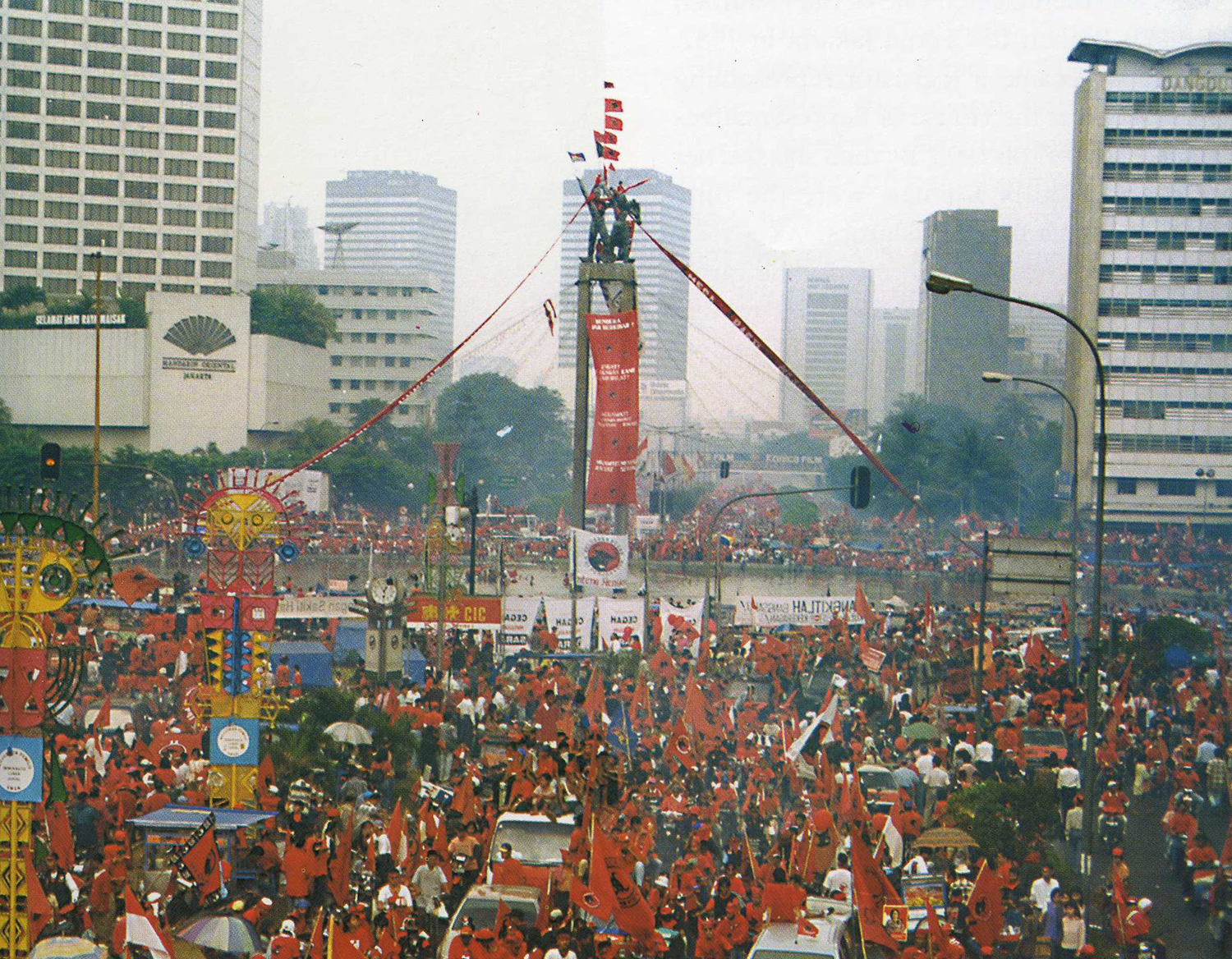
Members of PDI–P rally at the Hotel Indonesia Roundabout during the campaign period

The official election campaign began on 19 May 1999 and ended on 4 June to allow two 'rest days' before the vote itself. It was divided into three stages, with different parties being allowed to campaign on different days. However, before the campaign, there was violence between supporters of rival parties. Four people were killed in fighting between followers of the United Development Party (PPP) and the National Awakening Party (PKB) on 1 May and three more died in clashes between Golkar and Indonesian Democratic Party of Struggle (PDI-P) supporters on 11 May.

On the first day of the campaign there was a parade of party vehicles in Central Jakarta. The Golkar float was attacked and damaged The traffic circle in front of Hotel Indonesia was a popular spot for rallies. Meanwhile, there was an increase of people heading for Singapore to escape possible violence as polling day neared, with one newspaper reporting that more than 78,000 people had left.

As well as rallies, the major parties took out full-colour advertisements in newspapers. Each party was also given air time TV for statements by lone spokespeople. There were also ads in the newspapers urging people to use their vote.

In the final week, the main parties held huge rallies in the capital: the PKB on 1 June, the National Mandate Party (PAN) on 2 June, the PDI-P on 3 June and Golkar on 4 June, at which its supporters were attacked.

At one minute past midnight on 5 June, all party flags, banners and posters began to be removed as the campaign officially ended. International observers continued to arrive to oversee the election, among them former US president Jimmy Carter.

== Polling day ==
In the last few days before the vote on 7 June, newspapers carried advertisements sponsored by the Indonesian Election Committee (PPI) explaining how to vote and urging people to do so.

On the day itself, polls opened at 8 am. People cast their vote by piercing the party symbol on the ballot paper and then dipped a finger in indelible ink to prevent repeat voting. When the votes were counted, each ballot paper was held up for onlookers to see.

There was independent monitoring down to the level of polling stations by Indonesians as well as by 100 observers and support staff from 23 counties led by Jimmy Carter. On polling day, Carter said that it would have been extremely difficult to manipulate the election data because of the well-prepared information network and because the information was easy to access. One way the public could access the latest results was by sending a short message service text to a specific number. The sender then received information about provincial or party results.

On 9 June, Carter's team reported that although there had been "shortcomings" and allegations of financial abuses, they did not appear to have had a significant impact on the polling day activities.

== Results ==
The count was slow, with votes taking several weeks to count. Before he left Indonesia, Carter expressed his concern about this. At a meeting at the General Election Commission building on 26 June, only 22 of the 53 members of the commission were prepared to accept the result. These comprised the representatives of 17 of the parties (with 93% of the vote between them) and the five government representatives. Eventually, later that same day President Bacharuddin Jusuf Habibie in a live TV broadcast declared the results were valid. The PDI-P, led by Megawati Sukarnoputri, had won the largest share of the vote with Golkar in second place.

The process of allocating seats in the People's Representative Council took several months with the PPI announcing the results on 1 September. A total of 21 parties had won seats, with the PDI-P winning 153 and Golkar 120. There were ten parties with only one seat each.

Party	Votes	%	Seats	+/–
Indonesian Democratic Party of Struggle	35,689,073	33.74	153	New
Golkar	23,741,749	22.44	120	−205
National Awakening Party	13,336,982	12.61	51	New
United Development Party	11,329,905	10.71	58	−31
National Mandate Party	7,528,956	7.12	34	New
Crescent Star Party	2,049,708	1.94	13	New
Justice Party	1,436,565	1.36	7	New
Indonesian Justice and Unity Party	1,065,686	1.01	4	New
Nahdlatul Ummat Party	679,179	0.64	5	New
Indonesian Democratic Party	655,052	0.62	2	–9
United Party	551,028	0.52	1	New
Love the Nation Democratic Party	550,846	0.52	5	New
Indonesian Masyumi Islamic Political Party	456,718	0.43	1	New
People's Sovereignty Party	427,854	0.40	1	New
Indonesian National Party – Supeni	377,137	0.36	0	New
Indonesian Islamic Union Party	375,920	0.36	1	New
Indonesian National Christian Party	369,719	0.35	0	New
Indonesian National Party – Marhaenist Front	365,176	0.35	1	New
Indonesian Unity in Diversity Party	364,291	0.34	1	New
Indonesian National Party – Marhaen Masses	345,720	0.33	1	New
League of Supporters of Indonesian Independence	328,564	0.31	1	New
Community Awakening Party	300,064	0.28	1	New
Indonesian Muslim Awakening Party	289,489	0.27	0	New
Islamic Community Party	269,309	0.25	0	New
Catholic Democratic Party	216,675	0.20	1	New
Aceh Orphans' Foundation Party	213,979	0.20	0	New
Republican Party	208,157	0.20	0	New
Familial Consultative Party of Mutual Assistance	204,204	0.19	0	New
New Indonesia Party	192,712	0.18	0	New
Indonesian National Solidarity Party	180,167	0.17	0	New
Love and Peace Party	168,087	0.16	0	New
Indonesian Islamic Union Party – 1905	152,820	0.14	0	New
New Masyumi Party	152,589	0.14	0	New
National Party of the Indonesian Nation	149,136	0.14	0	New
Indonesian Democratic Union Party	140,980	0.13	0	New
National Labor Party	111,629	0.11	0	New
National Freedom Party	104,385	0.10	0	New
Democratic National Party	96,984	0.09	0	New
Indonesian Democratic Alliance Party	85,838	0.08	0	New
People's Democratic Party	78,730	0.07	0	New
Indonesian Workers' Party	63,934	0.06	0	New
Democratic Islamic Party	62,901	0.06	0	New
Great People's Consultative Party	62,006	0.06	0	New
All-Indonesia Workers' Solidarity Party	61,105	0.06	0	New
Indonesian People's Party	54,790	0.05	0	New
Indonesian Muslim Community	49,839	0.05	0	New
Workers' Solidarity Party	49,807	0.05	0	New
People's Choice Party	40,517	0.04	0	New
Appointed members			38	–37
Total	105,786,661	100.00	500	0
Source: Ministry of Information, KPU

=== Results by province ===
Province	Total seats	Seats won																				
Province	Total seats	PDI–P	Golkar	PPP	PKB	PAN	PBB	PK	PDKB	PNU	PKP	PDI	PDR	PKD	PKU	PSII	Masyumi	PNIFM	IPKI	PNIMM	PBI	PP
Aceh	12	2	2	4	0	2	1	0	0	1	0	0	0	0	0	0	0	0	0	0	0	0
North Sumatra	24	10	5	3	1	2	1	0	1	0	1	0	0	0	0	0	0	0	0	0	0	0
West Sumatra	14	2	4	3	0	3	1	1	0	0	0	0	0	0	0	0	0	0	0	0	0	0
Riau	9	3	3	1	1	1	0	0	0	0	0	0	0	0	0	0	0	0	0	0	0	0
Jambi	6	2	2	1	0	1	0	0	0	0	0	0	0	0	0	0	0	0	0	0	0	0
South Sumatra	15	6	4	2	1	1	1	0	0	0	0	0	0	0	0	0	0	0	0	0	0	0
Bengkulu	4	1	1	1	0	1	0	0	0	0	0	0	0	0	0	0	0	0	0	0	0	0
Lampung	15	6	3	1	2	1	0	1	0	1	0	0	0	0	0	0	0	0	0	0	0	0
Jakarta	18	7	2	3	1	3	1	1	0	0	0	0	0	0	0	0	0	0	0	0	0	0
West Java	82	27	20	13	6	6	3	2	0	1	1	0	0	0	0	1	1	0	0	0	0	1
Central Java	60	26	8	7	10	4	1	1	0	0	1	0	0	0	0	0	0	1	0	1	0	0
Yogyakarta	6	2	1	1	1	1	0	0	0	0	0	0	0	0	0	0	0	0	0	0	0	0
East Java	68	23	9	4	24	3	1	1	0	1	1	0	0	0	1	0	0	0	0	0	0	0
Bali	9	7	1	0	1	0	0	0	0	0	0	0	0	0	0	0	0	0	0	0	0	0
West Nusa Tenggara	9	1	4	1	0	1	1	0	0	0	0	0	1	0	0	0	0	0	0	0	0	0
East Nusa Tenggara	13	5	6	1	0	0	0	0	1	0	0	0	0	0	0	0	0	0	0	0	0	0
East Timor	4	2	2	0	0	0	0	0	0	0	0	0	0	0	0	0	0	0	0	0	0	0
West Kalimantan	9	2	3	1	0	0	0	0	1	0	0	1	0	0	0	0	0	0	0	0	1	0
Central Kalimantan	6	2	2	1	1	0	0	0	0	0	0	0	0	0	0	0	0	0	0	0	0	0
South Kalimantan	11	2	3	2	1	1	1	0	0	1	0	0	0	0	0	0	0	0	0	0	0	0
East Kalimantan	7	3	2	1	0	1	0	0	0	0	0	0	0	0	0	0	0	0	0	0	0	0
North Sulawesi	7	2	4	1	0	0	0	0	0	0	0	0	0	0	0	0	0	0	0	0	0	0
Central Sulawesi	5	1	3	1	0	0	0	0	0	0	0	0	0	0	0	0	0	0	0	0	0	0
South Sulawesi	25	2	16	3	1	1	1	0	0	0	0	0	0	0	0	0	0	0	1	0	0	0
Southeast Sulawesi	5	1	3	1	0	0	0	0	0	0	0	0	0	0	0	0	0	0	0	0	0	0
Maluku	6	2	2	1	0	0	0	0	1	0	0	0	0	0	0	0	0	0	0	0	0	0
Irian Jaya	13	4	5	0	0	1	0	0	1	0	0	1	0	1	0	0	0	0	0	0	0	0
Total	462	153	120	58	51	34	13	7	5	5	4	2	1	1	1	1	1	1	1	1	1	1
Sources: Psephos, Pemilu.asia

== Presidential election ==
On 20 and 21 October 1999, about four months after the legislative elections, the People's Consultative Assembly elected the president and vice president of Indonesia for the 1999–2004 term. Abdurrahman Wahid was elected president and Megawati Sukarnoputri as vice president.
