= Eka Supria Atmaja =

Indonesian politician (1973–2021)

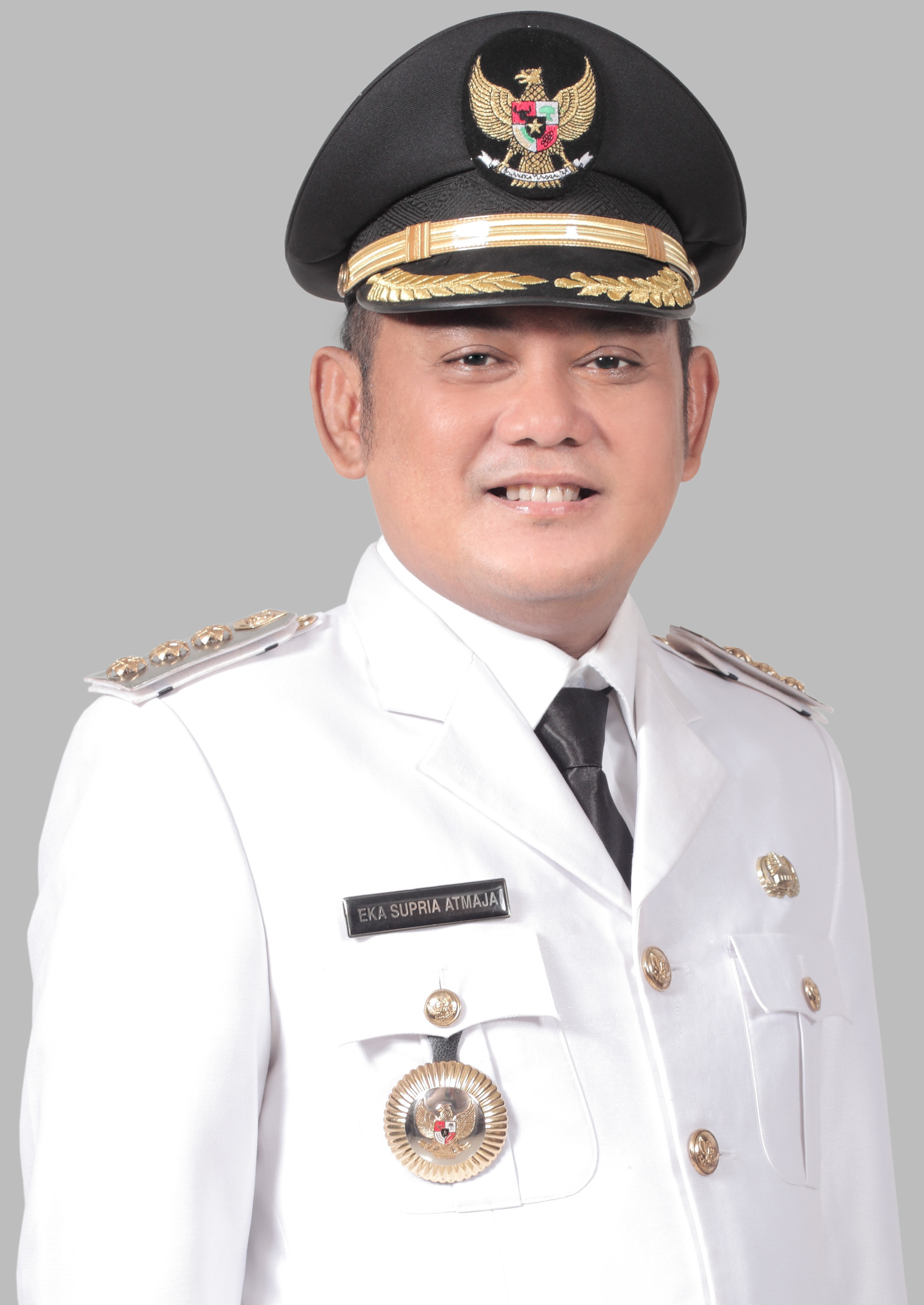

Regent of Bekasi
- In office 12 June 2019 – 11 July 2021
- President: Joko Widodo
- Governor: Ridwan Kamil
- Deputy: Akhmad Marjuki
- Preceded by: Neneng Hassanah Yasin
- Succeeded by: Herman Hanafi (acting)

Vice Regent of Bekasi
- In office 22 May 2017 – 18 October 2018
- President: Joko Widodo
- Governor: Ahmad Heryawan; Ridwan Kamil
- Preceded by: Rohim Mintareja
- Succeeded by: Akhmad Marzuki (2021)

Speaker of the Bekasi Regional People's Representative Council
- In office 28 August 2014 – 15 September 2016
- President: Susilo Bambang Yudhoyono; Joko Widodo
- Governor: Ahmad Heryawan
- Regent: Neneng Hassanah Yasin
- Preceded by: Mustakim
- Succeeded by: Sunandar

Personal details
- Born: February 9, 1973 Waluya Bekasi, West Java, Indonesia
- Died: 11 July 2021 (aged 48) Tangerang, Banten
- Party: Golkar
- Education: Borobudur University

Eka Supria Atmaja (9 February 1973 – 11 July 2021) was an Indonesian politician. He was Regent of Bekasi from 2019 to 2021. He died of COVID-19 during the COVID-19 pandemic in Indonesia.

== Biography ==
Eka Supria Atmojo was born in Waluya village, Bekasi on February 9, 1973. He graduated from Borobudur University in Jakarta in 1996 with a Bachelor of Laws.

He was elected to be village head of Waluya village for two terms running from 2001 to 2012. In 2014, he ran for membership in the Bekasi Regency regional council (DPRD, Indonesian: Dewan Perwakilan Rakyat Daerah) and was elected to the position of Chairman of the Bekasi Regency DPRD in 2014.

In 2017 he successfully ran for office for the position of deputy regent of Bekasi Regency along with Neneng Hassanah Yasin. When Yasin was arrested on bribery charges by the Corruption Eradication Commission (KPK) in October 2018, Atmaja was appointed in her place. From 2019 until his death he was also chairman of the regional leadership council of the Golkar party.

Atmaja tested positive for COVID on July 1, 2021. He was initially treated at Jababeka hospital, Cikarang, in Bekasi but as it was over capacity he was sent to the Siloam Hospital in Kelapa Dua, Tangerang Regency, in western Java. He died there on July 11, 2021.
