= List of political parties in Indonesia =

Since 1999, Indonesia has had a multi-party system. In the six legislative elections since the fall of the New Order regime, no political party has won an overall majority of seats, resulting in coalition governments.

Pursuant to the Indonesian political parties act, political parties' ideologies "must not be against Pancasila" and "is an explanation of Pancasila".

== Overview ==
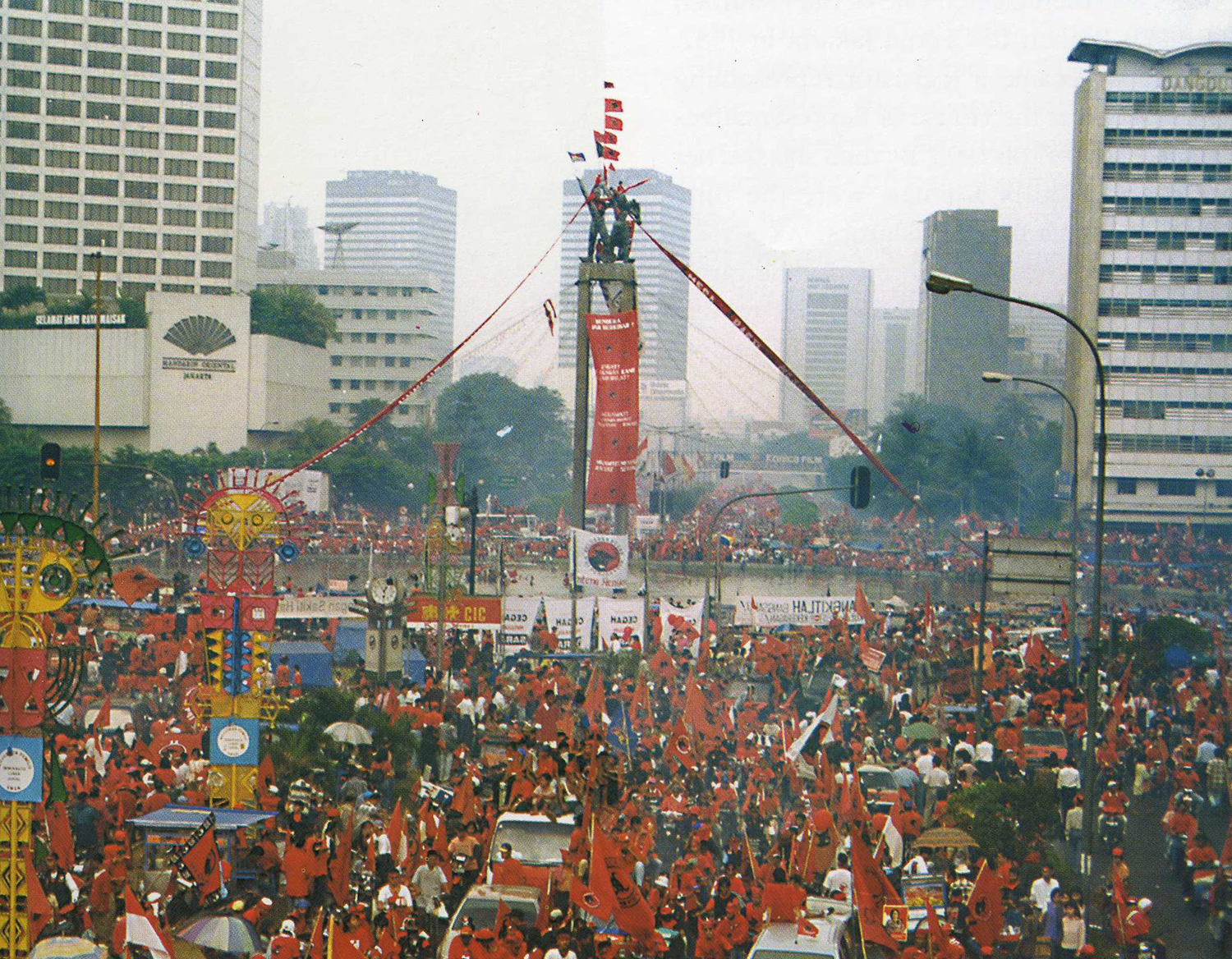
An election rally for the Indonesian Democratic Party of Struggle, 1999

The Indonesian political party system is regulated by Act No. 2 of 2008 on Political Parties. The law defines a political party as "a national organisation founded by like-minded Indonesian citizens with common goals to fulfill common interests and to defend the unity of the Unitary State of the Republic of Indonesia as based on Pancasila and the 1945 State Constitution of the Republic of Indonesia".

Political parties must register themselves with the Ministry of Law and Human Rights to be recognised by the authority. The law dictates that political parties' registration criteria shall include a notarial act recognising the party establishment and party constitution; a document describing party symbols; address of party headquarters and proof of distribution of party local offices in provinces, and cities and regencies; and a proof of party bank account. The law also dictates minimum membership of new political parties on 50 persons, with the percentage of woman members and allocation of woman members to party offices are set on a minimum of 30%.

=== Electoral eligibility ===
The party must undergo another registration process in order to participate in national elections; the registration shall be submitted to the General Elections Commission (KPU). Several criteria are required by the KPU, namely related to the party's presence in Indonesia's regions:

- A formal leadership in all provinces of Indonesia;
- A formal leadership in at least 75 percent of all regencies and cities in each province;
- A formal leadership in at least half of districts in a regency or city in which the party has a formal leadership;
- A card-holding membership of at least 1,000 or 1/1000 of the local population in the district branches.

Political parties who have had their registration declined by the electoral commission due to failure to satisfy administrative criteria or other reasons are able to appeal their rejection to the General Election Supervisory Agency (BAWASLU). Specifically for regional political parties in Aceh, the first requirement is waived, while the second and third requirements are set at two-thirds of the regencies/cities and districts.

=== Party principles ===
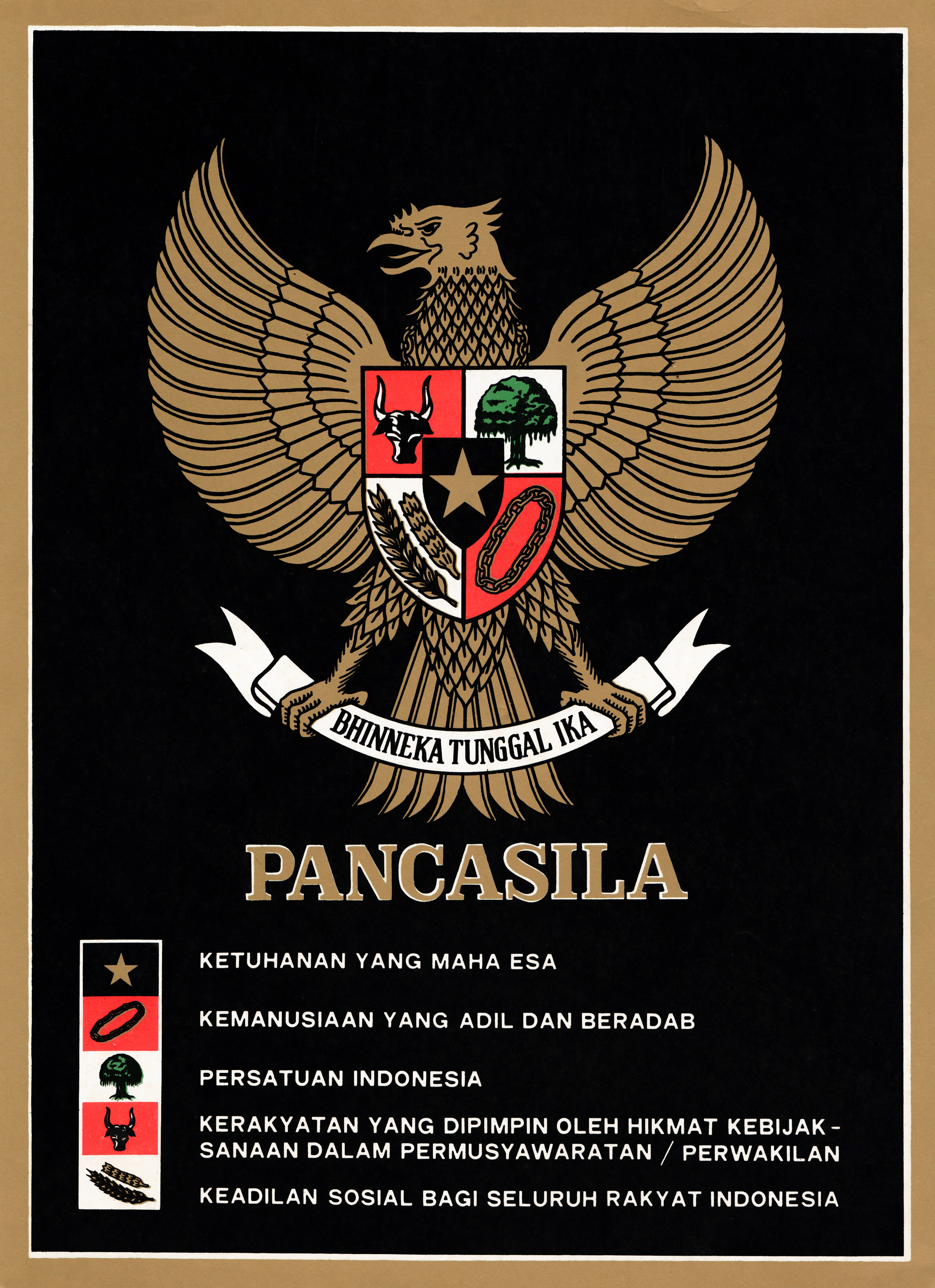
Indonesian political party should recognise the superiority of Pancasila, the national philosophy

Indonesian political parties should recognise the superiority of Pancasila and the national constitution, but Indonesian law tolerates the practice of other ideologies not in violation of the Pancasila and the constitution. A 1966 Provisional People's Consultative Assembly resolution still in force today, however, explicitly prohibits establishment of a communist party, and political parties are banned from adopting "Communism/Marxism-Leninism" (sic; explicitly defined in the resolution's corresponding explanatory memorandum to include "the struggle fundaments and tactics taught by ... Stalin, Mao Tse Tung et cetera") as the party ideology.

In essence, Indonesian political parties differs little on party policy and ideology. The only major difference between Indonesian parties is their position as to how major a role Islam, by far the nation's majority religion, should play in public affairs. This tendency resulting in several Indonesian political parties to brand itself as the part of nationalist-religious broad coalition in order to attract potential voters from both Muslim or Islamist and secular nationalist groups. Thus, for instance, (1) the Democratic Party (Demokrat), Party of Functional Groups (Golkar) and Indonesian Democratic Party of Struggle (PDI-P) are identified as the secular, (2) the National Awakening Party (PKB) and National Mandate Party (PAN) as the Muslim, but not Islamist, and (3) the Prosperous Justice Party (PKS) and United Development Party (PPP) as the Islamist.

The language of the left–right political spectrum is seldom used in Indonesia, in contrast with other countries. This tendency arose as the result of the New Order regime under Suharto which was anathema to left-wing policies after the 1965–66 Indonesian mass killings of members and supporters of the Communist Party of Indonesia. The New Order regime further stigmatised left-wing ideals as those espoused only by communists, discouraging Indonesian political parties from identifying themselves as left-wing movements lest they lose potential voters and be accused as communist. This tendency has survived even after the 1998 Reforms, partly due to the new regime's insistence on keeping anti-communist legislation in force. In addition, due to how widely presidents shared power, Indonesian party cartelization differs significantly from canonical electoral alliances in Europe.

=== Funding ===
Political parties which won seats in the national or regional parliaments are eligible for funding from the central or local governments, based on number of votes received in the relevant legislative elections. The funding amount is set for Rp 1,000 per vote received at the national level, Rp 1,200 at the provincial level, and Rp 1,500 at the city/regency level. Local government can opt to allocate more funding to political parties - Jakarta, for example, paid in 2021 Rp 5,000 per vote received. After the 2019 election, this amounted to Rp 126 billion (USD 8 million) from the central government on an annual basis. This payout only made up a small proportion of party revenues – the Indonesian Democratic Party of Struggle, for example, raised just 1.5 percent of its reported revenue from government funding. Donations and fees from elected officials made up a larger proportion of income.

== Parties represented in legislatures ==
=== Parties represented in national and regional legislatures ===
Logo	Name		Leader	Year		Status in the DPR		Provincial DPRD seats	City/regency DPRD seats
Logo	Name		Leader	Est.	First election	Seats	Status	Provincial DPRD seats	City/regency DPRD seats
	PDI-P	Indonesian Democratic Party of Struggle; Partai Demokrasi Indonesia Perjuangan	Megawati Sukarnoputri	1999 (Note: Split from the Indonesian Democratic Party, de facto, its transformation.)	1999	110 / 580	Check and balance	389 / 2,372	2,810 / 17,510
	Golkar	Party of Functional Groups; Partai Golongan Karya	Bahlil Lahadalia	1964	1971	102 / 580	Government	365 / 2,372	2,521 / 17,510
	Gerindra	Great Indonesia Movement Party; Partai Gerakan Indonesia Raya	Prabowo Subianto	2008	2009	86 / 580	Government	323 / 2,372	2,120 / 17,510
	NasDem	NasDem Party; Partai NasDem	Surya Paloh	2011	2014	69 / 580	Confidence and supply	265 / 2,372	1,849 / 17,510
	PKB	National Awakening Party; Partai Kebangkitan Bangsa	Muhaimin Iskandar	1998	1999	68 / 580	Government	220 / 2,372	1,833 / 17,510
	PKS	Prosperous Justice Party; Partai Keadilan Sejahtera	Al Muzzammil Yusuf	1999 (Note: as Partai Keadilan)	1999	53 / 580	Confidence and supply	210 / 2,372	1,312 / 17,510
	PAN	National Mandate Party; Partai Amanat Nasional	Zulkifli Hasan	1998	1999	48 / 580	Government	160 / 2,372	1,236 / 17,510
	Demokrat	Democratic Party; Partai Demokrat	Agus Harimurti Yudhoyono	2001	2004	44 / 580	Government	206 / 2,372	1,479 / 17,510

=== Parties represented only in regional legislatures ===
These parties participated in the 2024 elections but failed to attain a single seat in the national House of Representatives after winning less than the parliamentary threshold of 4% of the popular vote. Notable failures were of the United Development Party, which lost all its seats in the 2024 election after having been represented in DPR since 1977, and Hanura, which won DPR seats in 2009 and 2014 but lost them in 2019 and failed to recover their seats in 2024.

Despite electoral failure in the DPR, these parties successfully gained seat in regional parliaments (DPRD). Although, these political parties, along with other extra-parliamentary parties, are sometimes referred as partai gurem.

Aceh's special autonomy statutes allowed formation of local political parties to compete only in the Aceh House of Representatives. Although the party number is serialised from the national list, Aceh local parties only appeared in ballot paper circulating in Aceh province.

Logo	Name		Leader	Year		Provincial DPRD seats	City/regency DPRD seats
Logo	Name		Leader	Est.	First election	Provincial DPRD seats	City/regency DPRD seats
	PPP	United Development Party; Partai Persatuan Pembangunan	Muhamad Mardiono	1973	1977	83 / 2,372	850 / 17,510
	Hanura	People's Conscience Party; Partai Hati Nurani Rakyat	Oesman Sapta Odang	2006	2009	42 / 2,372	486 / 17,510
	PSI	Indonesian Solidarity Party; Partai Solidaritas Indonesia	Kaesang Pangarep	2014	2019	33 / 2,372	149 / 17,510
	Perindo	Indonesian Unity Party; Partai Persatuan Indonesia	Angela Tanoesoedibjo	2015	2019	31 / 2,372	349 / 17,510
	PBB	Crescent Star Party; Partai Bulan Bintang	Gugum Ridho Putra	1998	1999	12 / 2,372	164 / 17,510
	PKN	Nusantara Awakening Party; Partai Kebangkitan Nusantara	Anas Urbaningrum	2022	2024	4 / 2,372	52 / 17,510
	Garuda	Change Indonesia Guardian Party; Partai Garda Perubahan Indonesia	Ahmad Ridha Sabana	2015	2019	3 / 2,372	34 / 17,510
	Gelora	Indonesian People's Wave Party; Partai Gelombang Rakyat Indonesia	Anis Matta	2019	2024	1 / 2,372	72 / 17,510
	Ummat	Ummah Party; Partai Ummat	Ridho Rahmadi	2021	2024	0 / 2,372	20 / 17,510
	Buruh	Labour Party; Partai Buruh	Said Iqbal	2021	2024	0 / 2,372	11 / 17,510
Parties represented only in Aceh
	PA	Aceh Party; Partai Aceh	Muzakir Manaf	2007	2009	20 / 81	116 / 665
	PAS Aceh	Aceh Just and Prosperous Party; Partai Adil Sejahtera Aceh	Tu Bulqaini Tanjongan	2023	2024	3 / 81	16 / 665
	PNA	Nanggroe Aceh Party; Partai Nanggroe Aceh	Irwandi Yusuf	2011	2014	1 / 81	21 / 665
	PDA	Aceh Abode Party; Partai Darul Aceh	Muhibbussabri A. Wahab	2007 (Note: as Aceh Sovereignty Party (Partai Daulat Aceh))	2009	1 / 81	7 / 665
	SIRA	Independent Solidity of the Acehnese Party; Partai Soliditas Independen Rakyat Aceh	Muslim Syamsuddin	2007	2009	0 / 81	3 / 665

== Extra-parliamentary parties ==
These political parties have no representation in either national or regional parliaments.

The term "partai gurem" (minor party, literally "tropical fowl mite party" referring to the small size) is commonly used by Indonesian media to refer to these political parties. The term initially referred to political parties that won a very small number of parliamentary seat, but after the 2004 election, to political parties that have no chance of surpassing the parliamentary threshold (currently 4%) necessary to gain representation on the House of Representatives. These political parties are often perceived to be lacking in organisational structure, their leaders seemingly interested solely in attracting media attention.

These parties often have their attempts at registering for elections turned down by the KPU due to the parties' failure to satisfy registration criteria set by the commission, which includes completeness of party documents, a permanent physical party headquarters, minimum membership and minimum percentage of woman members. Parties that had their registration rejected often resort to appealing their rejection to the Bawaslu, with varied success.

Logo	Name (Note: Political parties registered at the KPU RI Political Party Registration System (SIPOL) for the 2024 general elections and other notable parties.)		Leader	Year	
Logo	Name		Leader	Est.	Contested elections
	PKP	Justice and Unity Party; Partai Keadilan dan Persatuan	Yussuf Solichien	1999	2019
	Berkarya	Party of Functional Banyan; Partai Beringin Karya	Muchdi Purwopranjono	2016	2019
	PKDI	Indonesian Dharma Awakening Party; Partai Kebangkitan Dharma Indonesia	Ngurah Arya	2007	2009
	Republik	Republican Party; Partai Republik	Suharno Prawiro	1998	1999
	Parsindo	Indonesian People's Voice Party; Partai Swara Rakyat Indonesia	M Jusuf Rizal	2013	
	PBI	Indonesian Bhinneka Party; Partai Bhinneka Indonesia	Nurdin Purnomo	1998 (Note: As "Indonesian Bhinneka Tunggal Ika Party")	1999
	Reformasi	Reform Party; Partai Reformasi	Syamsahril Kamal	2000	
	PPB	National Unity Party; Partai Pemersatu Bangsa	Eggi Sudjana	2001	
	Pakar	Republican Functional Party; Partai Karya Republik	Ari Sigit	2012	
	Rakyat	People's Party; Partai Rakyat	Arvindo Noviar	2014	
	PDRI	Indonesian People's Democracy Party; Partai Demokrasi Rakyat Indonesia	Ambarwati Santoso	2015 (Note: Reformed from Indonesian Democratic Vanguard Party (PPDI))	
	Pandai	Indonesian Sovereign Nation Party; Partai Negeri Daulat Indonesia	Farhat Abbas	2020	
	Masyumi	Masyumi Party; Partai Masyumi	Ahmad Yani	2020 (Note: Claimed inheritance from the original Masyumi)	
	PRIMA	Just and Prosperous People's Party; Partai Rakyat Adil Makmur	Agus Jabo Priyono	2021	
	PPB	National Guide Party; Partai Pandu Bangsa	Widyanto Kurniawan	2021	
	Perkasa	Village Awakening Movement Party; Partai Pergerakan Kebangkitan Desa	Eko Santjojo	2021 (Note: Reformed from Pioneers' Party)	
	PKR	People's Sovereignty Party; Partai Kedaulatan Rakyat	Tuntas Subagyo	2021	
	PMI	Indonesian Students Party; Partai Mahasiswa Indonesia	Eko Pratama	2021	
	IBU	Awaken and United Indonesia Party; Partai Indonesia Bangkit Bersatu	Zulki Zulkifli Noor	2021	
	PDSP	Prosperous Peace Party of Renewal; Partai Damai Sejahtera Pembaharuan	Hendrik RE Assa	2021 (Note: Reformed from Prosperous Peace Party)	
	PDKB	National Peace and Love Party; Partai Damai Kasih Bangsa	Apri Hananto Sukandar	2021	
	Pelita	Pelita Party; Partai Pelita	Ari Chandra Kurniawan	2022	
	Republiku	Indonesian Republiku Party; Partai Republiku Indonesia	Ramses David Simandjuntak		
	PRS	One Republic Party; Partai Republik Satu	D Yusad Siregar		
	Kongres	Congress Party; Partai Kongres	Zakariani Santoso		
	PP	Party of Change; Partai Perubahan	Robi Nurhadi	2024	
Parties that are not registered in the KPU RI Political Party Registration System
	SRI	Union of Independent People; Serikat Rakyat Independen	Damianus Taufan	2011	
	PHI	Green Party of Indonesia; Partai Hijau Indonesia	Collective leadership	2012	(Note: Did not seek registration for 2024 general elections)
Parties founded after the latest election
	PRI	Indonesian People's Party; Partai Rakyat Indonesia	Muhammad Nazaruddin	2025	
	PGB	Echo of the Nation Party; Partai Gema Bangsa	Ahmad Rofiq	2026	
	PGR	People's Movement Party; Partai Gerakan Rakyat	Sahrin Hamid	2026	

== Political party coalitions ==
Outside of the Suharto period, no political parties controlled a majority of the Indonesian parliament, necessitating the formation of coalitions. Coalitions may also be required to nominate candidates to executive office elections (i.e. President, Governors, Regents, Mayors and their deputies), and political parties often form coalitions for regional elections with parties which are on opposing coalitions at the national level.

Logo	Name		Active period	Status	Presidential candidate	Election	DPR seats		
Logo	Name		Active period	Status	Presidential candidate	Election	DPR seats	Formed	Disbanded
	PPPKI	Association of Political Organisations of the Indonesian People; Pemufakatan Perhimpunan-Perhimpunan Politik Kebangsaan Indonesia	1927–1942	Disbanded	—			17–18 December 1927	20 March 1942
	GAPI	Indonesian Political Federation; Gabungan Politik Indonesia	1939–1942	Disbanded	—			21 May 1939	20 March 1942
	PT	Central Axis; Poros Tengah	1999–2004	Disbanded	Abdurrahman Wahid	1999	163 / 462	7 October 1999	20 October 2004
	Bangsa	National Coalition; Koalisi Kebangsaan	2004–2009	Disbanded	Megawati Sukarnoputri	2004	307 / 550	19 August 2004	16 May 2009
	Rakyat	People's Coalition; Koalisi Kerakyatan	2004–2009	Continued (Joint Secretariat of the Government-Supporting Coalition Parties)	Susilo Bambang Yudhoyono	2004	278 / 550	28 August 2004	16 May 2009
	SetGab	Joint Secretariat of the Government-Supporting Coalition Parties; Sekretariat Gabungan Partai Koalisi Pendukung Pemerintahan	2009–2014	Disbanded	Susilo Bambang Yudhoyono	2009	317 / 560	16 May 2009	20 October 2014
	KIH	Great Indonesia Coalition; Koalisi Indonesia Hebat	2014–2018	Continued (Onward Indonesia Coalition)	Joko Widodo	2014	207 / 560	19 May 2014	10 August 2018
	KMP	Red-White Coalition; Koalisi Merah Putih	2014–2018	Disbanded	Prabowo Subianto	2014	292 / 560	14 July 2014	18 September 2018
	KIM	Onward Indonesia Coalition; Koalisi Indonesia Maju	2018–2024	Disbanded	Joko Widodo	2019	349 / 575	10 August 2018	20 October 2024
	KIAM	Just and Prosperous Indonesia Coalition; Koalisi Indonesia Adil Makmur	2018–2019	Disbanded	Prabowo Subianto	2019	226 / 575	18 September 2018	28 June 2019
	KIB	United Indonesia Coalition; Koalisi Indonesia Bersatu	2022–2023	Disbanded	Airlangga Hartarto (Note: one of the candidate names and prioritized by the coalition)	2024 (Note: scheduled)	148 / 575	13 May 2022	13 August 2023
	KIM	Advanced Indonesia Coalition; Koalisi Indonesia Maju	since 2022	Active	Prabowo Subianto	2024	280 / 580	13 August 2022	
	KP	Coalition of Change; Koalisi Perubahan	2023–2024	Disbanded	Anies Baswedan	2024	190 / 580	24 March 2023	30 April 2024
	KSPP	Alliance of Political Parties Supporting Ganjar Pranowo; Kerja Sama Partai Politik Pengusung Ganjar Pranowo	2023–2024	Disbanded	Ganjar Pranowo	2024	110 / 580	30 April 2023	6 May 2024

== Historical political parties ==
=== Pre-independence parties ===
In the first decade of the 20th century as a natural outcome of the Dutch Ethical Policy, which emphasised the importance of looking after the welfare of the people of the Dutch East Indies, the Dutch were tolerant of the rise and development of Indonesian society. Through this, the Dutch allowed the creation of education societies and funded its creation. Dutch educated Intelligentsias' would establish schools and education across the Dutch East Indies. Whilst the policy attempted to raise awareness among the natives of the need to break free from the shackles of the feudal system and develop along Western lines and were concerned about the native population's social and cultural conditions, it spearheaded the spread of Indonesian National Revivalism, allowing people to silently organize and articulate their objections to colonial rule. The Budi Utomo was considered the first nationalist society (not party yet) in the Dutch East Indies, initiated the Indonesian National Awakening. Among other political organizations were the Indo Europeesch Verbond (Indo-European Alliance) and Indonesia Arab Association. Over time organizations turned into political parties, such how Budi Utomo turned into Parindra and Sarekat Islam into Indonesian Islamic Union Party. The Indische Partij is considered the first Indonesian political party. Years of campaigning by various political organizations across the Dutch East Indies eventually compelled the Dutch Government to recognize the need for concessions. As a result, on 16 December 1916, Governor-General J.P. van Limburg Stirum, in collaboration with the Dutch Minister of Colonial Affairs, Thomas Bastiaan Pleyte, sanctioned the establishment of a legislative assembly designed to represent the people of the Dutch East Indies. This assembly was named the Volksraad.

The Japanese occupation of the Dutch East Indies began when the Japanese invaded the Dutch East Indies through Tarakan, Kalimantan, on 8 March 1942. By the Japanese Government, parties that were based on Indonesian nationalism and wanted to fight for Indonesian Independence were dissolved and banned from political activities on 20 March 1942.

Name		Established	Dissolved	Notes	Independence method
Indies Party; Indische Partij	IP	1912	1913	Advocated Indonesian independence.	Non-cooperative
Insulinde; Nationaal Indische Partij	NIP	1913	1919	Direct successor to the Indies Party, advocated in establishing an independent dominion for Indo people in the Dutch East Indies.	Non-cooperative
Sundanese Association; Paguyuban Pasundan		1913 (Note: as cultural organization); 1919 (Note: also as political party)	1942 (Note: as political party, nowadays exists only as cultural organization)	Advocated to preserve Sundanese culture by involving not only Sundanese people but all those who care about Sundanese culture and to pursue Indonesian Independence	Cooperative
Communist Party of Indonesia; Partai Komunis Indonesia	PKI	1914	1966	Before 1920 as the Indies Social Democratic Association (Indische Sociaal-Democratische Vereeniging).	Non-cooperative
Indies Catholic Party; Indische Katholieke Partij	IKP	1917	1949	Made as a response to the emergence of nationalist inlander movements, it represented Dutch totok Roman Catholic interests. It had close ties with its mainland counterpart, the Roman Catholic State Party.	Dutch party
Christian Constitutional Party; Christenlijk Staatkundige Partei	CSP	1917	1942	Before 1929 as the Christian Ethic Party (Christelijk Ethische Partij). Advocated to make the statutes of God, as revealed in the Holy Scriptures, nature, and history, the foundation of political life in the Dutch East Indies. Also invited native Indonesians, which was rare for a Dutch-majority party at the time. Precursor to Parkindo.	Dutch party
Indonesian Islamic Union Party; Partai Syarikat Islam Indonesia	PSII	1923	1973	Advocated Islamic socialism.	Non-cooperative
Catholic Party; Partai Katolik	PK	1923	1973	Split from IKP. Advocated for Christian democracy for natives.	Cooperative
Indonesian National Party; Partai Nasional Indonesia	PNI	1927	1931	The first incarnation (second in 1945) of the significant party, which advocated Indonesian independence.	Non-cooperative
Chinese Association; Chung Hwa Hui	CHH	1928	1942	Advocated Chinese rights in the Dutch East Indies.	Cooperative
Indonesian Party; Partai Indonesia	Partindo	1931	1936	Advocated Indonesian independence.	Non-cooperative
National Socialist Movement in the Dutch East Indies; Nationaal-Socialistische Beweging in Nederlands-Indië		1931	1940	East Indies branch of the NSB. Most of its members were Indos.	Dutch party
Indonesian Chinese Party; Partai Tionghoa Indonesia	PTI	1932	1942	Advocated closer ties between Chinese and native Indonesians.	Cooperative
Indonesian Fascist Party; Partai Fasis Indonesia	PFI	1933	1933	Advocated an independent Java, led by an ethnic Javanese descendant of Sutawijaya as its constitutional monarch, ruling over a federation of kingdoms across Nusantara.	Non-cooperative
Great Indonesian Party; Partai Indonesia Raya	Parindra	1935	1939	National conservative party, that advocated for full political rights for Indonesians in a system of government in the Dutch East Indies.	Cooperative
Indonesian People's Movement; Gerakan Rakyat Indonesia	Gerindo	1937	1942	Successor to Partindo, left-wing nationalist party.	Cooperative
Indonesian Islamic Party; Partai Islam Indonesia	PII	1938	1942	Cooperative split from PSII.	Cooperative

=== Political parties participating in 1955 and 1971 elections ===
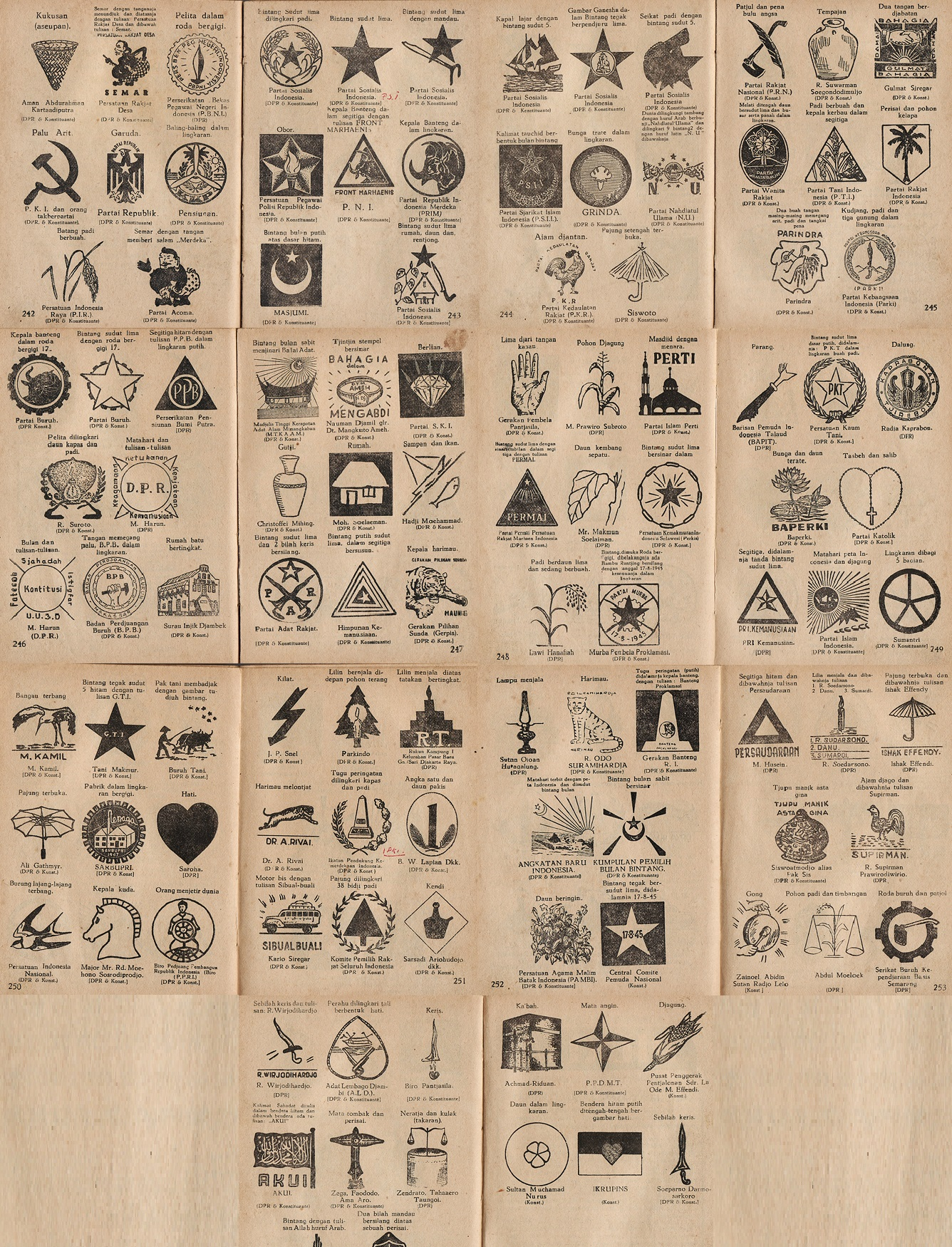
Parties that had been officially registered in Indonesia in 1954.

The election in 1955 was the first national election held since the end of the Indonesian National Revolution, and saw over 37 million valid votes cast in over 93 thousand polling locations, with more than 30 parties participating. Due to the numerous political parties participating in the election, the result was inconclusive, with no party receiving a clear mandate. The legislature which was elected through the election would eventually be dissolved by President Sukarno in 1959, through Presidential Decree number 150. Later on, after the take over by the New Order regime, only 10 parties was allowed to participate in the 1971 legislative election.

Logo	Name		Established	Dissolved	Contested elections		
Logo	Name		Established	Dissolved	1955		1971
Logo	Name		Established	Dissolved	DPR	Constitutional Assembly	1971
	Indonesian Islamic Union Party; Partai Serikat Islam Indonesia	PSII	1923; 1947	1973			
	Indonesian National Party; Partai Nasional Indonesia	PNI	1946	1973			
	Communist Party of Indonesia; Partai Komunis Indonesia	PKI	1914	1966; Banned			
	Masyumi Party; Majelis Syuro Muslimin Indonesia	Masyumi	1943 (Note: as religious administrative board); 1945 (Note: as political party)	1960; Banned; Revived in 2020			
	Islamic Education Movement; Pergerakan Tarbijah Islamijah	Perti	1928 (Note: as religious organization); 1945 (Note: as political party)	1973			
	Nahdhatul Ulama	NU	1952	1973; Still active as religious organisation			
	Indonesian Christian Party; Partai Kristen Indonesia	Parkindo	1945	1973			
	Catholic Party; Partai Katolik		1923	1973			
	Socialist Party of Indonesia; Partai Sosialis Indonesia	PSI	1945	1960; Banned			
	Indonesian Marhaen People's Union; Persatuan Rakyat Marhaen Indonesia	Permai	1945				
	Popular Consultative Party; Partai Musyawarah Rakyat Banyak	Murba	1948	1973; Revived in 1998			
	Labour Party; Partai Buruh		1949				
	National People's Party; Partai Rakyat Nasional	PRN	1950				
	Indonesian People's Party; Partai Rakjat Indonesia	PRI	1950				
	League of Supporters of Indonesian Independence; Ikatan Pendukung Kemerdekaan Indonesia	IPKI	1954	1973; Revived in 1998			
	Pancasila Defender Movement; Gerakan Pembela Pantja Sila	GPPS	1955				
	Police Employee Association of the Republic of Indonesia; Persatuan Pegawai Polisi Republik Indonesia	P3RI	1955				
	Indonesian Citizenship Consultative Assembly; Badan Permusjawaratan Kewarganegaraan Indonesia	Baperki	1954				
	Great Indonesia Unity Party Wongsonegoro; Partai Indonesia Raya Wongsonegoro	PIR/W	1948 Split in 1954				
	Great Indonesia Unity Party Hazairin; Partai Indonesia Raya Hazairin	PIR/RIN	1948 Split in 1954				
	Great Indonesia Unity Party West Nusa Tenggara; Partai Indonesia Raya Nusa Tenggara Barat	PIR/NTB	1948 Split in 1954				
	Indonesian Movement; Gerakan Indonesia	Grinda	1955				
	Dayak Unity Party; Partai Persatuan Dayak	PPD	1946	1959; Banned			
	Islamic Tharikah Unity Party; Partai Persatuan Tharikah Islam	PPTI					
	Islamic Victory Force; Angkatan Kemenangan Umat Islam	AKUI					
	Village People's Union; Persatuan Rakjat Desa	PRD					
	Party of the People of Free Indonesia; Partai Rakjat Indonesia Merdeka	PRIM					
	Young Communist Force; Angkatan Communis Muda	Acoma	1952	1965; Banned			
	Muslim Party of Indonesia; Partai Muslimin Indonesia	Parmusi	1967	1973			
	R. Soedjono Prawirosoedarso; R. Soedjono Prawirosoedarso		1955	1957			
	Sundanese Choice Movement; Gerakan Pilihan Sunda	Gerpis					
	Indonesian Peasants Party; Partai Tani Indonesia	PTI	1945				
	King of Keprabohan; Radja Keprabonan		1955				
	Indonesian Republican Bull Movement; Gerakan Banteng Republik Indonesia	GBRI					
	Centre for the Candidacy Movement of La Ode M. Effendi; Pusat Penggerak Pentjalonan La Ode M. Effendi	L.M. Idrus Effendi	1955				
Parties that failed to enter or lost contested elections
	People's Heritage Party; Partai Adat Rakyat	PAR	1950	1959			

=== Political parties of the New Order ===
==== Government parties ====
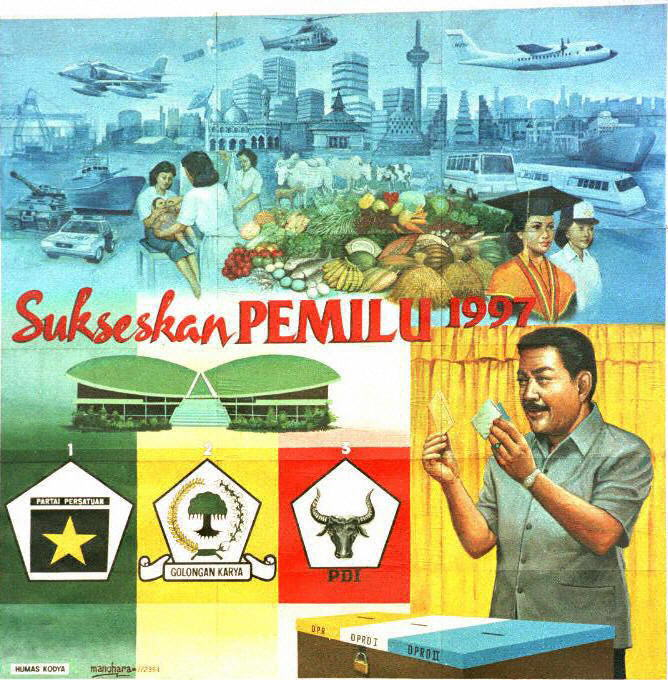
A poster encouraging citizens to support the 1997 Indonesian legislative election.

After his rise into power, President Suharto expressed his discontent regarding multiple political parties, arguing that the failure of Konstituante in 1955–1959 was caused by party deadlock — unacceptable in his regime. He proposed that existing political parties unite based on their ideological essence — either spiritual (religious) or materialist (secular nationalist) — in order to cripple the resulting umbrella parties with infighting. Political parties' reaction to Suharto's propositions was generally positive, with Islamic parties claiming that party fusion was in line with their last National Islamic Congress resolution agreed in 1969. A political alliance dubbed the "Democratic Development Group" was formed by the PNI, the IPKI, Parkindo, the Murba Party, and the Catholic Party to compete in 1971 election.

After 1971 election, New Order regime reiterated its call for political parties to fuse, and a MPR ordinance regulating political parties grouping issued in 1973 further pressured political parties to merge. All Islamic political parties merged to form the United Development Party (PPP) on 5 January 1973, and the remaining nationalist and non-Islamic political parties united to form the Indonesian Democratic Party (PDI) on 10 January 1973. Golkar, officially a "federation of public organisations" but effectively a political party, remained dominant for the entirety of the New Order. From 1985, all political parties were required to declare national ideology Pancasila as their "one and only ideological basis".

The parties participated for the last time in the 1997 election, and the three-party system survived until the collapse of the New Order in 1998 Reformasi. Ensuing political liberalisation allowed establishment of multitudes of new political parties, with the number of political parties participating in 1999 election jumping substantially to 48 parties.

Logo	Name		Established	Fate
	Party of Functional Groups; Partai Golongan Karya	Golkar	1964	Active
	Indonesian Democratic Party; Partai Demokrasi Indonesia	PDI	1973	Disbanded in 2003 succeeded by PPDI
	United Development Party; Partai Persatuan Pembangunan	PPP	1973	Active

==== Activist parties ====
Prior to the end of the New Order era, there was a time when several political activists and student movements established small political parties in the early 1990s. Sensing the near fall of the New Order, the formation of these newly unregistered and unrecognized political parties was based on opposition to the New Order government and positioned themselves as the opposition and played a crucial part in the fall of the new order. The new parties then and only participated in the 1999 elections.

Whilst the New Masyumi Party predates the wave of the new opposition parties, the Indonesian Democratic Union Party (PUDI) was considered as the first genuine opposition party. As PUDI was upfront and outspoken in their political opposition as a party against the New Order regime, the first out of many. At one point, fielding both presidential and vice-presidential candidates, PUDI was considered a challenger to Suharto's rule. Emboldened by the success of PUDI, the Democratic People's Association (PRD) organisation declared itself the People's Democratic Party (also abbreviated as PRD). On 22 July 1996, the PRD was officially declared to the public and announced its political manifesto.

Logo	Name		Established	Fate
	League of Supporters of Indonesian Independence; Ikatan Pendukung Kemerdekaan Indonesia	IPKI	1994/1998 (Note: Claimed inheritance from the original IPKI)	Non-active
	Indonesian National Party – Supeni; Partai Nasional Indonesia – Supeni	PNI-Supeni	1995 (Note: as Indonesian National Unity (Persatuan Nasional Indonesia))/1998 (Note: Claimed inheritance from the original PNI)	Disbanded in 2002. Merged to form the Indonesian National Party Marhaenism
	New Masyumi Party; Partai Masyumi Baru		1995	Non-active
	Indonesian Democratic Union Party; Partai Uni Demokrasi Indonesia	PUDI	1996	Non-active
	People's Democratic Party; Partai Rakyat Demokratik	PRD	1996	Disbanded in 2021; Merged with the Just and Prosperous People's Party

=== Political parties in Reform era (1998–2004) ===
==== Parties participating only in 1999 elections ====
Following political liberalisation after the collapse of the New Order regime in 1998 Reformasi, registration for new political parties jumped significantly. As the result, the following 1999 election had 148 registered political parties and 48 of them competing for DPR seats, compared to the previous 1997 election that saw only 2 political parties plus Golkar.

After the Reform, the PPP survived and continues to participate in all following elections after 1999, albeit with much of its membership having broken off from it and founded their own parties. Golkar too was made a proper party and exists to this day. The PDI failed to imitate the post-Suharto successes of the PPP and Golkar after the government intervened and unseated Chairman Megawati Soekarnoputri, causing PDI support to collapse in the 1997 election. PDI votes further eroded as support instead went to its breakaway Indonesian Democratic Party of Struggle (PDI-P), led by Megawati in the post-Suharto 1999 election, resulting in the party winning only two seats in contrast to the PDI-P's 153 seats. After poor electoral performance and failure to register for the 2004 election, PDI rebranded itself as the Indonesian Democratic Vanguard Party (PPDI) in 2003.

Several parties claimed inheritance from former political parties existing prior to the New Order era, resulting in parties sharing similar political party names, with faction names as the only characteristics that made those parties distinct from each other. Example on this case was on claimants to the heritage of the former Indonesian National Party (PNI), Indonesian Islamic Union Party (PSII), League of Supporters of Indonesian Independence (IPKI), Masyumi Party, and Murba Party.

Most of the parties failed to gain even a single seat due to lack of votes. After the new electoral law authorised the use of a parliamentary threshold to determine the division of DPR seats, those parties were forced to reorganise themselves in order to be able to register for the next 2004 election.

Below is the list of political parties participating only in the 1999 election which failed to participate in the next 2004 election.

Logo	Name		Established
	Aceh Orphans' Foundation Party; Partai Abul Yatama	PAY	1999
	All-Indonesia Workers' Solidarity Party; Partai Solidaritas Pekerja Seluruh Indonesia	PSPSI	1998
	Democratic Catholic Party; Partai Katolik Demokrat	PKD	1998
	Democratic Islamic Party; Partai Islam Demokrat	PID	1998
	Democratic National Party; Partai Nasional Demokrat	PND	1998
	Familial Consultative Party of Mutual Assistance; Partai Musyawarah Kekeluargaan Gotong Royong	MKGR	1998
	Indonesian Democratic Alliance Party; Partai Aliansi Demokrat Indonesia	PADI	1998
	Indonesian Democratic Union Party; Partai Uni Demokrasi Indonesia	PUDI	1996
	Indonesian Islamic Political Party "Masyumi"; Partai Politik Islam Indonesia "Masyumi"		1998
	Indonesian Islamic Ummah Party; Partai Umat Muslimin Indonesia	PUMI	1998
	Indonesian Islamic Union Party; Partai Syarikat Islam Indonesia	PSII	1998 (Note: Claimed inheritance from the original PSII)
	Indonesian Islamic Union Party 1905; Partai Syarikat Islam Indonesia 1905	PSII 1905	1998
	Indonesian Muslim Awakening Party; Partai Kebangkitan Muslim Indonesia	KAMI	1998
	Indonesian National Christian Party; Partai Kristen Nasional Indonesia	Krisna	1998
	Indonesian National Party – Marhaenist Front; Partai Nasional Indonesia – Front Marhaenis	PNI-FM	1999
	Indonesian National Party – Marhaen Masses; Partai Nasional Indonesia – Massa Marhaen	PNI-MM	1998
	Indonesian National Party – Supeni; Partai Nasional Indonesia – Supeni	PNI-Supeni	1995 / 1998
	Indonesian National Union Solidarity Party; Partai Solidaritas Uni Nasional Indonesia	SUNI	1998
	Indonesian People's Party; Partai Rakyat Indonesia	Pari	1998
	Indonesian Workers' Party; Partai Pekerja Indonesia	PPI	1998
	Islamic Ummah Party; Partai Ummat Islam	PUI	1998
	League of Supporters of Indonesian Independence; Ikatan Pendukung Kemerdekaan Indonesia	IPKI	1994 / 1998
	Love and Peace Party; Partai Cinta Damai	PCD	1998
	Murba Party; Partai Musyawarah Rakyat Banyak	Murba	1998 (Note: Claimed inheritance from the original Murba)
	National Freedom Party; Partai Kebangsaan Merdeka	PKM	1998
	National Love Democratic Party; Partai Demokrasi Kasih Bangsa	PDKB	1998
	National Party of the Indonesian Nation; Partai Nasional Bangsa Indonesia	PNBI	1998
	New Indonesia Party; Partai Indonesia Baru	PIB	1999
	New Masyumi Party; Partai Masyumi Baru		1995
	People's Choice Party; Partai Pilihan Rakyat	Pilar	1998
	People's Sovereignty Party; Partai Daulat Rakyat	PDR	1999
	Justice Party; Partai Keadilan	PK	1999
	United Party; Partai Persatuan	PP	1999
	Ummah Awakening Party; Partai Kebangkitan Umat	PKU	1998
	Workers' Solidarity Party; Partai Solidaritas Pekerja	PSP	1999
	People's Democratic Party; Partai Rakyat Demokratik	PRD	1996

==== Parties participating in 2004 and 2009 elections ====
After the 1999 legislative election, 150 parties were registered with the Ministry of Law and Human Rights. However, after a review by the newly formed General Election Commission, this number was reduced to 50, and then to 24. This decrease from the 48 parties that ran in the 1999 legislative election was primarily due to a new election law that allowed only parties that had won 2% of DPR seats or 3% of seats in provincial and regental legislatures in half of the provinces to run in the 2004 election. Only six parties met this criterion, and the others were forced to merge or reorganize into a new party.

In 2009, introduction of a parliamentary threshold also meant that only parties receiving more than 2.5% of the popular vote would be seated in the DPR. This threshold was raised to 3.5% in 2014, then finally to 4% in 2017 as a way to cut election costs and ensure stability. As a result small parties have no chance of surpassing the parliamentary threshold.

Below is the list of political parties participating in the 2004 and 2009 elections which failed to participate in the next 2014 election.

Name		Established	Dissolved	Contested elections	
Name		Established	Dissolved	2004	2009
Labour Party; Partai Buruh	PB	1998; As "National Labour Party"	2021; Reformed into the Labour Party		
Indonesian Democratic Party of Devotion; Partai Kasih Demokrasi Indonesia	PKDI	1998	2011; Merged to form the National Unity Party		
Patriot Party; Partai Patriot		1998	2011; Merged to form the National Unity Party		
Ulema National Awakening Party; Partai Kebangkitan Nasional Ulama	PKNU	2000s	2022; Merged into the People's Sovereignty Party (PKR)		
Archipelago Republic Party; Partai Republika Nusantara	RepublikaN	2001	2013; Merged into the People's Conscience Party		
Prosperous Peace Party; Partai Damai Sejahtera	PDS	2001	2013; Merged into the People's Conscience Party		
Indonesian National Party Marhaenism; Partai Nasional Indonesia Marhaenisme	PNIM	2002; Merger of PNI–Supeni and PNI–MM			
Pioneers' Party; Partai Pelopor	PP	2002	2011; Merged to form the National Unity Party		
Reform Star Party; Partai Bintang Reformasi	PBR	2002	2011; Merged into the Gerindra Party		
Regional Unity Party; Partai Persatuan Daerah	PPD	2002	2011; Merged to form the National Unity Party		
New Indonesia Association Party; Partai Perhimpunan Indonesia Baru	PPIB	2002	2012; Merged to form Concern for the Nation Functional Party		
Concern for the Nation Functional Party; Partai Karya Peduli Bangsa	PKPB	2002			
Democratic Nationhood Party; Partai Demokrasi Kebangsaan	PDK	2002	2011; Merged to form the National Unity Party		
Freedom Party; Partai Merdeka	PM	2002	2011; Merged to form the National Unity Party		
Indonesian Unity Party; Partai Sarikat Indonesia	PSI	2002	2005; Merged into the National Mandate Party		
Indonesian Nahdlatul Community Party; Partai Persatuan Nahdlatul Ummah Indonesia	PPNUI	2003			
Indonesian Democratic Vanguard Party; Partai Penegak Demokrasi Indonesia	PPDI	2003	2011; Merged to form the National Unity Party		

=== Political parties in post-reform era (2005–present) ===
Below is the list of defunct political parties established in a period from 2005 to present.

Name		Established	Dissolved	Contested elections
Democratic Renewal Party; Partai Demokrasi Pembaruan	PDP	2005	2011; Merged to form the National Unity Party	
Sovereignty Party; Partai Kedaulatan	PK	2006	2013; Merged into the People's Conscience Party	
National People's Concern Party; Partai Rakyat Peduli Nasional	PPRN	2006	2013; Merged into the People's Conscience Party	
National Sun Party; Partai Matahari Bangsa	PMB	2006	2014	
Functional Party of Struggle; Partai Karya Perjuangan	Pakar Pangan	2007	2012; Merged into Democratic Party	
Indonesian Youth Party; Partai Pemuda Indonesia	PPI	2007	2011; Merged to form the National Unity Party	
National Front Party; Partai Barisan Nasional	PBN	2007		
Prosperous Indonesia Party; Partai Indonesia Sejahtera	PIS	2007	2011; Merged to form the National Unity Party	
Nusantara Prosperous Party; Partai Kemakmuran Bangsa Nusantara	PKBN	2011	2012; Merged to form the Concern for the Nation Functional Party	
New Indonesia National Sovereignty Party; Partai Kedaulatan Bangsa Indonesia Baru	PKBIB	2012		
Peace and Safe Islamic Party; Partai Islam Damai Aman	Idaman	2015	2018; Merged into the National Mandate Party	
Indonesian People's Da'wah Party; Partai Dakwah Rakyat Indonesia	PDRI	2021	2025; Merged into the Ummah Party	

=== Others ===
==== Indonesian integrationist parties ====
Logo	Name		Established	Dissolved	Notes
	Indonesian Irian Independence Party; Partai Kemerdekaan Indonesia Irian	PKII	1946	1962	Founded in Netherlands New Guinea, advocated integration of Western New Guinea into Indonesia.
	Timorese Popular Democratic Association; Associação Popular Democrática Timorense	APODETI	1974	2007	Founded in Portuguese Timor, advocated integration of East Timor into Indonesia.

== See also ==
- Politics of Indonesia
- List of political parties by country
- List of youth wings of political parties in Indonesia

== Selected bibliography ==
- Abuza, Zachary (2007). Political Islam and Violence in Indonesia. London; New York: Routledge. ISBN 978-0-415-39401-7.
- Al-Hamdi, Ridho (2013). Partai politik Islam: Teori dan praktik di Indonesia [Islamic political parties: Theory and practice in Indobesia] (PDF) (in Indonesian). Yogyakarta: Graha Ilmu. ISBN 978-602-262-049-5.
- Ananta, Aris; Arifin, Evi Nurvidya & Suryadinata, Leo (2005). Emerging Democracy in Indonesia. Singapore: Institute of Southeast Asian Studies. ISBN 981-230-323-5.
- Dirkse, Jan-Paul; Hüsken, Frans & Rutten, Mario, eds. (1993). Development and Social Welfare: Indonesia’s Experiences under the New Order. Leiden: Koninklijk Instituut voor Taal-, Land- en Volkenkunde.
- Evans, Kevin Raymond (2003). The History of Political Parties & General Elections in Indonesia. Jakarta: Arise Consultancies. ISBN 979-97445-0-4.
- Feith, Herbert (2007) [1962]. The Decline of Constitutional Democracy in Indonesia. Jakarta; Kuala Lumpur: Equinox Pub. ISBN 978-979-3780-45-0.
- Fogg, Kevin W. (2020). Indonesia's Islamic Revolution. Cambridge: Cambridge University Press. ISBN 978-110-876-821-4.
- Formichi, Chiara (2012). Islam and the Making of the Nation: Kartosuwiryo and Political Islam in 20th Century Indonesia (PDF). Leiden: E. J. Brill. ISBN 978-90-04-26046-7.
- Hwang, Julie Chernov (2014). "Patterns of normalization: Islamist parties in Indonesia". In Mecham, Quinn; Hwang, Julie Chernov (eds.). Islamist parties and political normalization in the Muslim world. Philadelphia, Pa: University of Pennsylvania Press. ISBN 9780812246056.
- Indonesia Electoral, Political Parties Laws and Regulations Handbook — Strategic Information, Regulations, Procedures (updated ed.). International Business Pub., USA. 2015. ISBN 9781514517017.
- Kahin, Audrey (2015). Historical Dictionary of Indonesia. Historical Dictionaries of Asia, Oceania, and the Middle East, 51 (3rd ed.). Lanham, Ma: Rowman & Littlefield. ISBN 978-0-8108-7195-3.
- King, Blair A. (2011). "Chapter 4. Government and Politics". In Frederick, William H.; Worden, Robert L. (eds.). Indonesia: A Country Study. Area handbook series, 39. Library of Congress, Federal Research Division (6th ed.). Washington, DC: U.S. Government Printing Office. pp. 225–306. ISBN 978-0-8444-0790-6.
- King, Dwight Y. (2003). Half-Hearted Reform: Electoral Institutions and the Struggle for Democracy in Indonesia (2024 Online Version). Wesport, Conn: Praeger. ISBN 978-0-2759-7942-3.
- Labolo, Muhadam; Ilham, Teguh (2015). Partai Politik dan Sistem Pemilihan Umum di Indonesia: Teori, Konsep dan Isu Strategi [Political Parties and the General Election System in Indonesia: Theory, Concepts and Strategy Issues] (in Indonesian). Jakarta: Rajawali Pers. ISBN 978-979-769-881-2.
- Machmudi, Yon (2008). Islamising Indonesia: The Rise of Jemaah Tarbiyah and the Prosperous Justice Party (PKS) (e-Book). Islam in Southeast Asia. ANU Press. doi:10.22459/II.11.2008. ISBN 9781921536243.
- Madinier, Rémy (2015). Islam and Politics in Indonesia: The Masyumi Party between Democracy and Integralism. Translated by Jeremy Desmond. Singapore: NUS Press. ISBN 978-9971-69-843-0. PDF
- Miaz, Yalvema (2012). Partisipasi Politik: Pola Perilaku Pemilih Pemilu Masa Orde Baru dan Reformasi [Political Participation: Behavioral Patterns of Election Voters during the New Order and Reform Period] (PDF) (in Indonesian). Padang: UNP Press. ISBN 978-602-8819-65-7.
- Mietzner, Marcus (2013). Money, Power, and Ideology: Political Parties in Post-Authoritarian Indonesia. Singapore: NUS Press. ISBN 978-9971-69-768-6.
- Nainggolan, Bestian; Wahyu, Yohan, eds. (2016). Partai Politik 1999–2019, Konsentrasi dan Dekonsentrasi Kuasa [Political Parties 1999–2019, Concentration and Deconcentration of Power]. Kompaspedia (in Indonesian). Jakarta: Buku Kompas. ISBN 978-602-412-005-4.
- Noer, Deliar (1987). Partai Islam di pentas nasional 1945–1965 [Islamic parties on the national stage 1945–1965] (in Indonesian). Jakarta: Pustaka Utama Grafiti.
- Pringgodigdo, Abdul Karim (1984) [1949]. Sejarah pergerakan rakyat Indonesia [History of Indonesian Popular Movements] (in Indonesian). Jakarta: Dian Rakyat.
- Ricklefs, M.C. (2008) [1981]. A History of Modern Indonesia Since c.1300 (4th ed.). London: MacMillan. ISBN 978-0-230-54685-1.
- Riswandha, Imawan (1989). The Evolution of Political Party Systems in Indonesia, 1900 to 1987. Northern Illinois University Press.
- Sebastian, Leonard C.; Hasyim, Syafiq; Arifianto, Alexander R., eds. (2021). Rising Islamic Conservatism in Indonesia: Islamic Groups and Identity Politics. London; New York: Routledge. ISBN 978-0-367-81941-5.
- Tomsa, Dirk (2008). Party Politics and Democratization in Indonesia: Golkar in the post-Suharto era (2010 Online version). Routledge contemporary Southeast Asia series. London; New York: Routledge. ISBN 978-041-557-429-7.
- Ufen, Andreas (2009). "Political parties and democratization in Indonesia". In Bünte, Marco; Ufen, Andreas (eds.). Democratization in post-Suharto Indonesia. London; New York: Routledge. pp. 160–168.
- Vickers, Adrian (2005). A History of Modern Indonesia. Cambridge University Press. ISBN 0-521-54262-6.
