= Hitler Nababan =

Indonesian politician (b. 1973)

Hitler Nababan S.H.
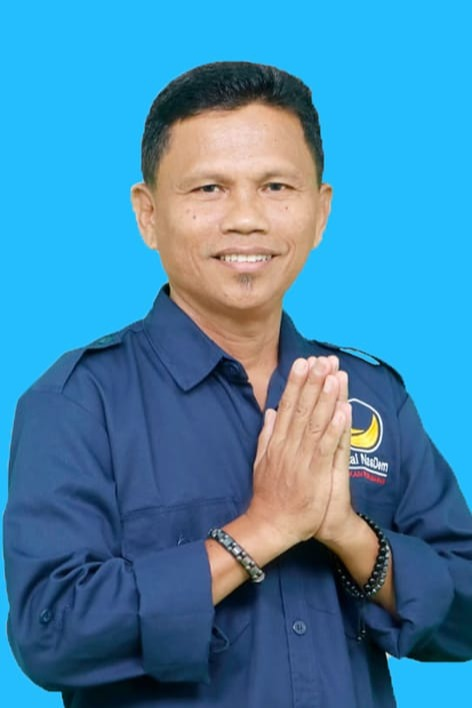

Member of the Karawang Regional Representative Council
- In office 5 August 2014 – 5 August 2019
- Parliamentary group: Democratic Party
- Constituency: Karawang 1
- Majority: 6,278 votes

Personal details
- Born: July 23, 1973 (age 52) Aceh, Indonesia
- Party: Democratic Party
- Other political affiliations: Indonesian Democratic Party of Devotion (before 2013)

Hitler Nababan (born 23 July 1973) is an Indonesian politician from the Democratic Party who served as a member of the Karawang Regional Representative Council (the city's legislative body) from 2014 until 2019.

== Personal life ==
Hitler Nababan was born on 23 July 1973. He moved to Karawang in 1994, upon completing his secondary education at the HKBP Vocational High School a year before. Prior to his election as a member of parliament, he worked as a moneylender.

He received a law degree from the Dharma Andhiga Law School in 2017 after studying for four years.

Hitler is married to Betti Minaria Limbong and has three daughters and a son.

=== Name ===
Hitler stated that his father named him after Adolf Hitler. He stated that he surprised voters whenever he introduced himself, and voters would ask to see his identity card. Regarding the connotation of his name, Hitler stated that he was a "different kind of Hitler" that "never killed people and not a Nazi" and claimed that he was "the new Hitler who will make another history".

== Political career ==
At the 2009 Indonesian legislative election, Hitler was nominated by the Indonesian Democratic Party of Devotion as a candidate for the Karawang Regional Representative Council for the Karawang 1 constituency. Hitler's party obtained 482 votes in the constituency, and he did not win the election.

Following his loss in the elections, Hitler moved to the Democratic Party. He was nominated again for the Karawang 1 constituency in the 2014 Indonesian legislative election. In this election, Hitler managed to obtain 6,278 votes in the constituency, the fifth most votes for a single candidate in the constituency, giving him a seat in the Karawang Regional Representative Council.

== Member of Karawang Regional Representative Council ==
On 5 August 2014, Hitler along with other members of the Karawang Regional Representative Council, was inaugurated for a 5-year term. Inside the council, Hitler was seated in the Commission C, which handled matters relating to public works, spatial planning, transportation, mining and energy, public housing, environment, sanitation, parks, regional ports, development of sea potential, informatics, and multimedia.

Hitler was known by his fellow MPs as an outspoken politician. Ahmad Ardiansyah, an MP from the People's Conscience Party, stated that Hitler often asked critical questions to bureau heads during budget drafting sessions.

During his term, Hitler conducted a work trip for a week in October 2015, visiting subdistricts located in his constituency. Following his work trip, Hitler stated that several people do not know the candidates in the Karawang regional election and that most people appreciated the infrastructure development in Karawang.

In an interview with the Karawang Bekasi Ekspres newspaper in October 2018, Hitler supported the construction of pathways and pavement in isolated villages in Karawang. In another interview in November 2018, Hitler stated his support for the reparation and maintenance of streets in Karawang. He argued that damaged roads in Karawang were caused by the lack of maintenance of oversight by the Public Works Bureau of Karawang.

=== Incident ===
External image
- Image posted by Hitler Nababan to the WhatsApp group

In April 2018, Hitler posted a meme which depicted leader of the Islamic Defenders Front Habib Rizieq and former speaker of the People's Consultative Assembly from the National Mandate Party Amien Rais in the council's budgeting body WhatsApp group. The meme depicted a manipulated image of Amien Rais and Habib Rizieq riding an air compressor. Trying to make the meme funnier, Hitler also added a caption which reads as pesawat pengintai (reconnaissance aircraft). An hour after he posted the meme, a fellow MP named Danu Hamidi tried to warn him about his actions and commented karawang buatlah sejuk (keep Karawang calm), and another MP named Opik commented neeh mahh, takut dianggap unsur (this... may offend ethnicity, religion, race, and inter-group relations). After Danu Hamidi warned him, Hitler later apologized about his posts in the group. In addition, the leader of the Democratic Party faction inside the council, Pendi Anwar, also apologized to the members of the WhatsApp group and to the MPs from the National Mandate Party.

Although he had apologized in the group, the screenshot of him posting the meme was publicized on 22 May 2018. A group of people calling themselves the Karawang Community Forum stated that they felt offended by the post. Ahmad Rifai, another MP in the council, arranged a meeting between Hitler and the forum. At 3:00 pm on the same day, the group gathered in the front of the council building and met with Hitler for clarification. When Rifai and Hitler arrived inside the deliberations building of the council, an angry mob barged into the building and began beating Hitler.

A few moments later, Hitler was escorted by the municipal police into another room in the council. The situation began to de-escalate after a group of police under the command of Slamet Waloya, the police chief of Karawang, began showing up to the building. Hitler was brought to a hospital near the council building shortly after.

=== Reactions ===
Following the incident, the chairwoman of the Democratic Party in Karawang, Cellica Nurrachadiana, apologized on behalf of the party. In a press conference, she also stated that the party is still discussing whether it should impose sanctions on Hitler. Hitler himself stated that he was prepared to receive any kind of sanctions from the party, including being recalled from the council.

The secretary general of the Democratic Party, Agus Hermanto, stated that Hitler's actions do not represent the Democratic Party as a whole. He also urged other Democratic Party cadres and members to not spread memes that could potentially insult constituents.

Meanwhile, the Islamic Defenders Front stated that Hitler's acts were intolerable. The chairman of the judicial assistance body of the Islamic Defenders Front, Sugito Atmo Prawiro, stated that "Hitler has acted outrageously by insulting clerics, habibs, and Amien Rais". The National Mandate Party stated that the party was not angry with Hitler's act. The Deputy Chairman of the Honorary Council of the National Mandate Party, Drajad Wibowo, stated that Amien Rais "would probably laugh if he saw the meme".

== Later career ==
Hitler was nominated by the Democratic Party for the Karawang 6 electoral district in the 2019 Indonesian general election. Although his party managed to obtain two seats from the constituency, Hitler himself did not win any seats.

Hitler was elected as the 3rd Deputy Secretary of the Karawang branch of the Democratic Party in 2018 and served until 2023. In the 2024 election, he was nominated by the party for a seat at the West Java Regional House of Representatives from the West Java 10 electoral district, which includes Karawang and Purwakarta. He received 21,408 votes and lost to Sabil Akbar from his own party.
