= 2009 Indonesian presidential election =

- 8 July 2009
- Registered: 176,367,056 (▲13.75%)
- Turnout: 72.57% (▼5.66pp)
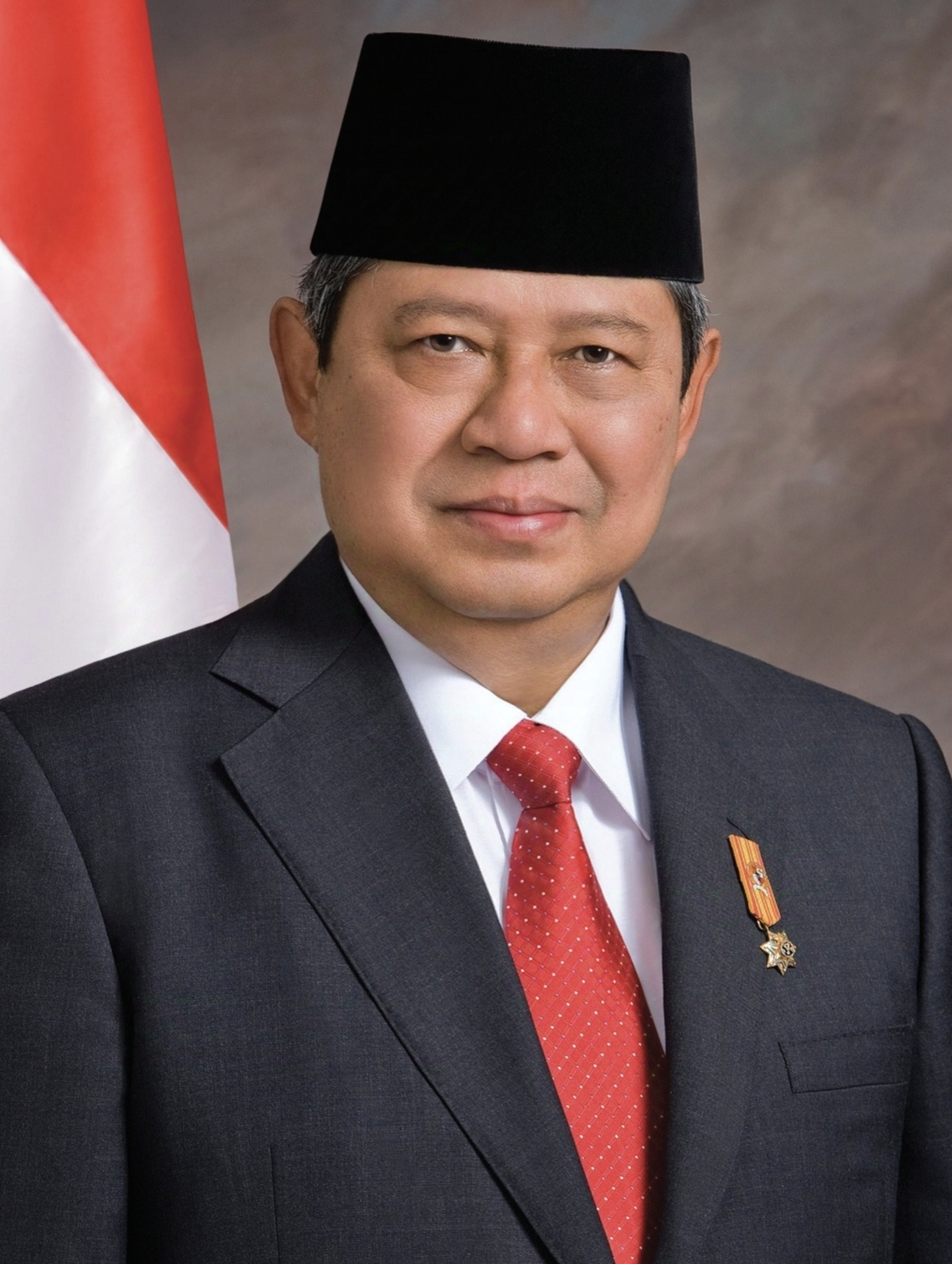

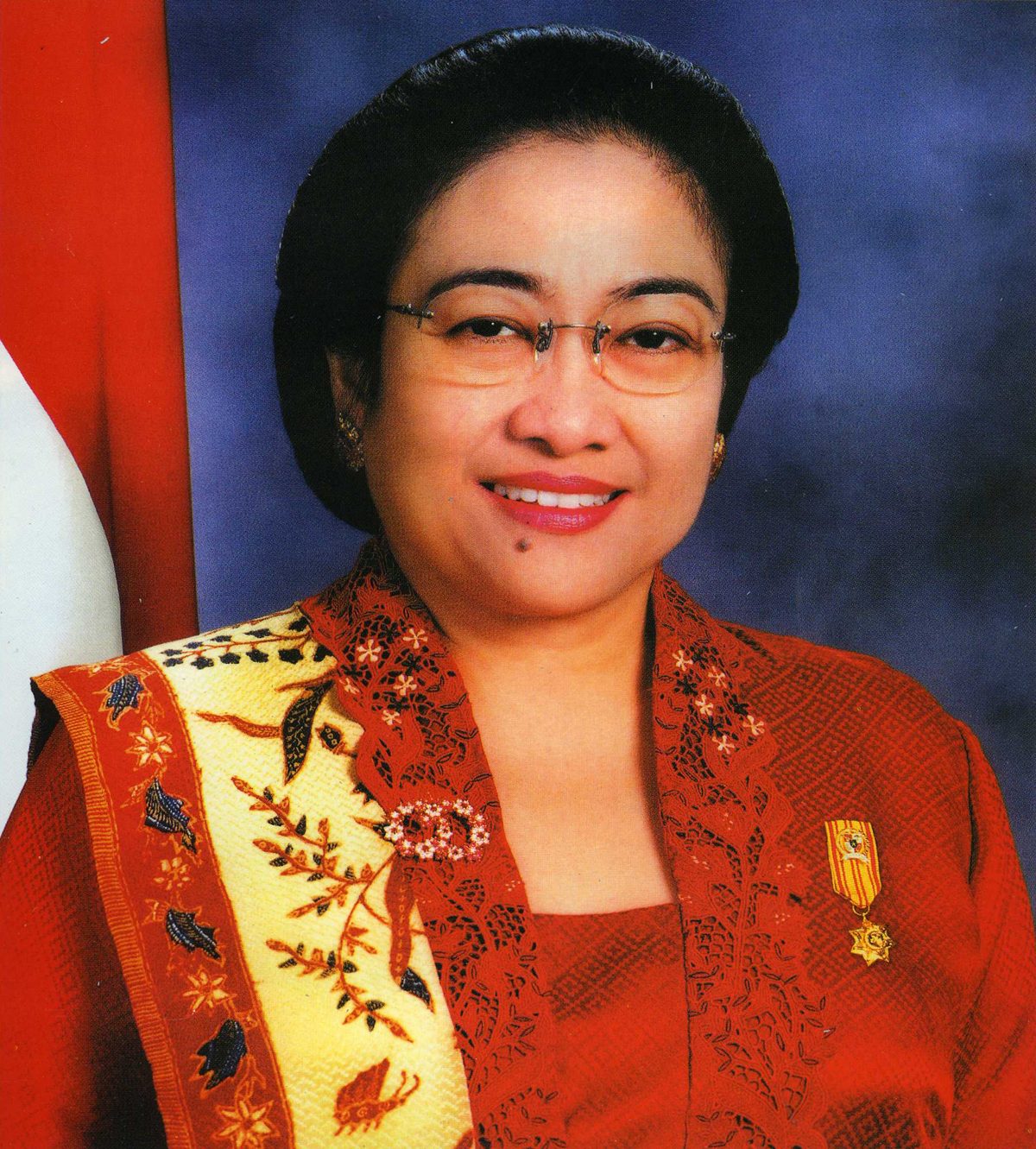

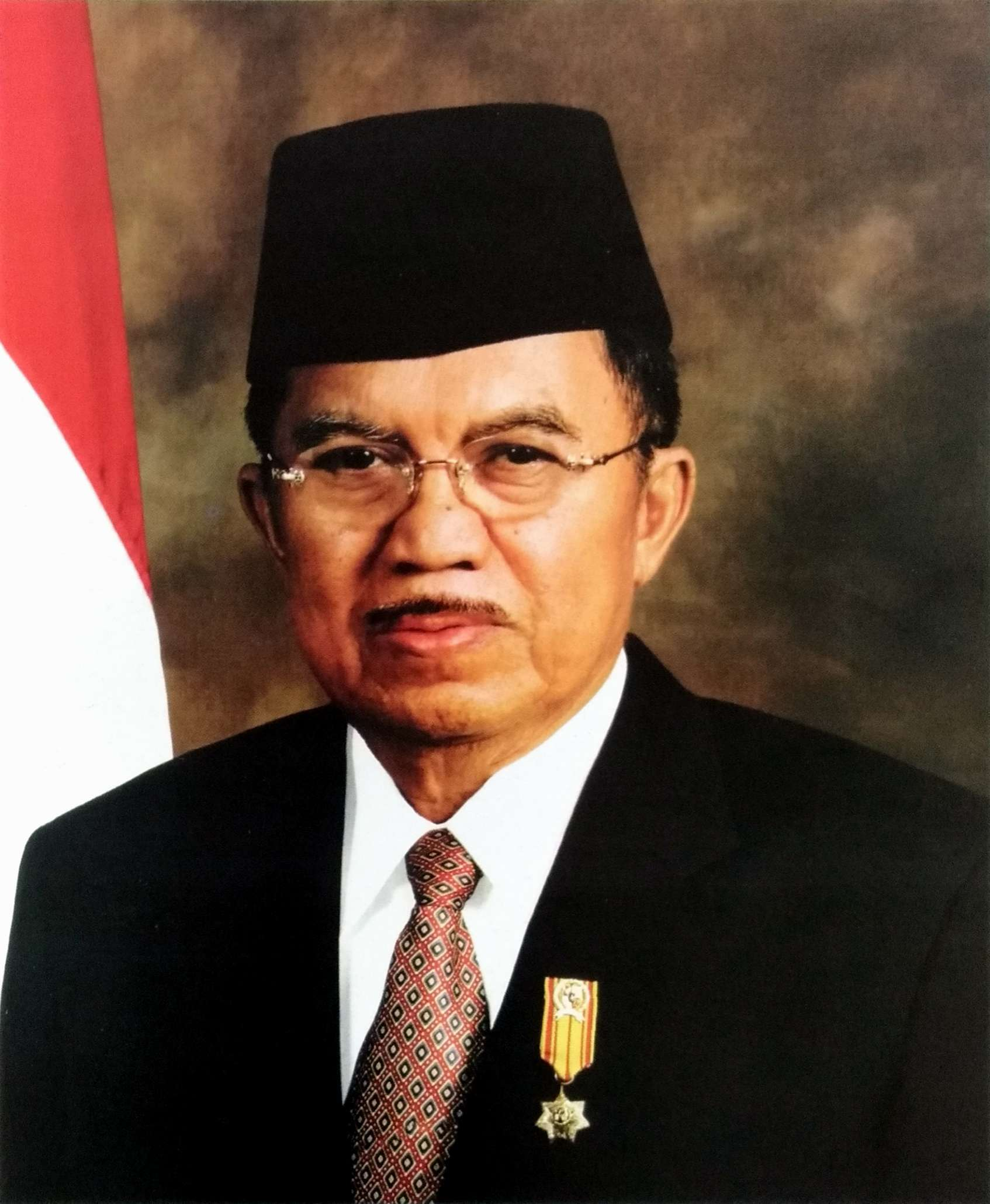
Candidate	Susilo Bambang Yudhoyono	Megawati Sukarnoputri	Jusuf Kalla
Party	Demokrat	PDI-P	Golkar
Alliance	Joint Secretariat	Mega–Prabowo	JK–Wiranto
Running mate	Boediono	Prabowo Subianto	Wiranto
Popular vote	73,874,562	32,548,105	15,081,814
Percentage	60.80%	26.79%	12.41%
- Results by province
President before election
Susilo Bambang Yudhoyono
Demokrat
Elected President
Susilo Bambang Yudhoyono
Demokrat

Presidential elections were held in Indonesia on 8 July 2009. The elections returned a president and vice president for the 2009–2014 term. Incumbent President Susilo Bambang Yudhoyono, elected with a 20% margin in the 2004 election, sought a second term against former President Megawati Sukarnoputri in a rematch of the 2004 election, as well as incumbent Vice President Jusuf Kalla. Securing a majority of the votes in a landslide victory in the first round, Yudhoyono was re-elected without the need to proceed to a second round. Yudhoyono was officially declared the victor of the election on 23 July 2009, by the General Election Commission (KPU). At the time of his re-election victory, Yudhoyono, with nearly 74 million votes in his favour, held the record for the highest number of votes for a single person in any democratic election in history, surpassing Barack Obama's total of 69.5 million votes in the 2008 United States presidential election. His record was surpassed by his respective successors Joko Widodo who won more than 85 million votes in 2019 and Prabowo Subianto who won more than 96 million votes in 2024.

== Background ==
This was the second election in which Indonesians elected their President and Vice President directly. In 2004, Susilo Bambang Yudhoyono defeated incumbent Megawati Sukarnoputri in a run-off election. Polls through early January 2009 saw Yudhoyono leading a large field of potential presidential candidates.

Incumbent vice president Jusuf Kalla announced in February 2009 that he would not be returning as a vice presidential candidate with Yudhoyono. Instead, he was ready to challenge Yudhoyono should Golkar, the party which he chaired, nominate him as a presidential candidate. Other individuals interested in becoming presidential candidates included former President Abdurrahman Wahid, former People's Representative Council (DPR) Speaker Akbar Tandjung, Yogyakarta Sultan Hamengkubuwana X, and former Jakarta Governor Sutiyoso.

On 17 February the Constitutional Court ruled that independent candidates would not be allowed to run in the election.

== Coalition talks ==
Following legislative elections held on 9 April, coalitions of political parties began to emerge in order to nominate candidates for President and Vice President. Under the 2008 Presidential Election Law, the candidates must be nominated by a party or coalition that won at least 25% of the popular vote or 112 (20%) of 560 seats of the DPR. Indonesia's Constitutional Court also ruled that independent candidates would not be allowed to run. Candidates had to officially register with the KPU by midnight of 16 May in order to appear on the ballots.

It initially appeared that Golkar, the party of incumbent Vice President Jusuf Kalla, would enter into a coalition with the Indonesian Democratic Party of Struggle (PDI-P) of former president Megawati Sukarnoputri to challenge President Susilo Bambang Yudhoyono's Democratic Party. However, talks were broken off on 13 April 2009, with Golkar reportedly more interested in continuing the coalition with Yudhoyono rather than risk being cut off from power completely. Yudhoyono was also in talks with Islamist parties in a bid to form a coalition controlling more than half the seats in parliament.

By late April 2009, Golkar was in talks with smaller parties to gain the votes it lacked to be able to nominate Kalla as a presidential candidate. A ten-party coalition was formed on 1 May, consisting of Golkar, PDI-P, the Gerindra Party, the People's Conscience Party (Hanura), the Prosperous Peace Party (PDS), the Reform Star Party (PBR), the Ulema National Awakening Party (PKNU), the National People's Concern Party (PPRN), the Labor Party and the Indonesian Nahdlatul Community Party (PPNUI). Two parties who had been considering joining the coalition, the National Mandate Party (PAN) and the United Development Party (PPP), in the end, decided not to join. Shortly after the ten-party coalition was announced, incumbent Vice President Kalla announced a joint ticket with former Indonesian military leader Wiranto.

The PDI-P selected former president Megawati as its presidential candidate on 7 May but did not immediately announce a running mate. The possibility of Gerindra leader Prabowo Subianto becoming Megawati's running mate had been favoured by PDI-P leadership, but the two parties had yet to come to an agreement two days before the 16 May candidate registration deadline. After plans to announce the pair's candidacy were postponed to allow for continuing negotiations, both parties eventually declared on 15 May the nomination of Megawati and Prabowo as candidates for president and vice president.

In the scenario that either Kalla or Megawati would have lost his or her bid for the presidency in the first election round, one candidate would have supported the other in the second round, as agreed upon by the grand coalition formed to oppose incumbent President Yudhoyono.

On 12 May 2009, Yudhoyono chose Boediono, the governor of Bank Indonesia (Indonesia's central bank), as his running mate. Four parties which had planned to form a coalition with Yudhoyono's Democratic Party (PAN, PPP, the National Awakening Party (PKB), and the Prosperous Justice Party (PKS)) had expected that the vice presidential nominee would come from one of their parties. Although they threatened to form their own coalition with Gerindra and present their own candidate, PKB became the first party in the coalition to support Yudhoyono's decision. The remaining three parties eventually agreed to support the Yudhoyono–Boediono ticket and attended the nomination ceremony in Bandung on 15 May.

Political party	Supporting	
Political party	For President	For Vice President
Indonesian Democratic Party of Struggle (PDI-P)	Megawati Sukarnoputri (PDI-P)	Prabowo Subianto (Gerindra)
Gerindra Party (Gerindra)	Megawati Sukarnoputri (PDI-P)	Prabowo Subianto (Gerindra)
Sovereignty Party (Partai Kedaulatan)	Megawati Sukarnoputri (PDI-P)	Prabowo Subianto (Gerindra)
Functional Party of Struggle (PKP)	Megawati Sukarnoputri (PDI-P)	Prabowo Subianto (Gerindra)
Indonesian National Party Marhaenism (PNI Marhaenisme)	Megawati Sukarnoputri (PDI-P)	Prabowo Subianto (Gerindra)
Labor Party (Partai Buruh)	Megawati Sukarnoputri (PDI-P)	Prabowo Subianto (Gerindra)
Indonesian Nahdlatul Community Party (PPNUI)	Megawati Sukarnoputri (PDI-P)	Prabowo Subianto (Gerindra)
Indonesian Unity Party (PSI)	Megawati Sukarnoputri (PDI-P)	Prabowo Subianto (Gerindra)
Freedom Party (Partai Merdeka)	Megawati Sukarnoputri (PDI-P)	Prabowo Subianto (Gerindra)
Democratic Party (PD)	Susilo Bambang Yudhoyono (Demokrat)	Boediono (Independent)
Prosperous Justice Party (PKS)	Susilo Bambang Yudhoyono (Demokrat)	Boediono (Independent)
National Mandate Party (PAN)	Susilo Bambang Yudhoyono (Demokrat)	Boediono (Independent)
United Development Party (PPP)	Susilo Bambang Yudhoyono (Demokrat)	Boediono (Independent)
National Awakening Party (PKB)	Susilo Bambang Yudhoyono (Demokrat)	Boediono (Independent)
Crescent Star Party (PBB)	Susilo Bambang Yudhoyono (Demokrat)	Boediono (Independent)
Prosperous Peace Party (PDS)	Susilo Bambang Yudhoyono (Demokrat)	Boediono (Independent)
Concern for the Nation Functional Party (PKPB)	Susilo Bambang Yudhoyono (Demokrat)	Boediono (Independent)
Reform Star Party (PBR)	Susilo Bambang Yudhoyono (Demokrat)	Boediono (Independent)
National People's Concern Party (PPRN)	Susilo Bambang Yudhoyono (Demokrat)	Boediono (Independent)
Indonesian Justice and Unity Party (PKPI)	Susilo Bambang Yudhoyono (Demokrat)	Boediono (Independent)
Democratic Renewal Party (PDP)	Susilo Bambang Yudhoyono (Demokrat)	Boediono (Independent)
Indonesian Workers and Employers Party (PPPI)	Susilo Bambang Yudhoyono (Demokrat)	Boediono (Independent)
Archipelago Republic Party (PRN)	Susilo Bambang Yudhoyono (Demokrat)	Boediono (Independent)
Patriot Party (Partai Patriot)	Susilo Bambang Yudhoyono (Demokrat)	Boediono (Independent)
Indonesian National Populist Fortress Party (PNBK)	Susilo Bambang Yudhoyono (Demokrat)	Boediono (Independent)
Indonesian Youth Party (PPI)	Susilo Bambang Yudhoyono (Demokrat)	Boediono (Independent)
National Sun Party (PMB)	Susilo Bambang Yudhoyono (Demokrat)	Boediono (Independent)
Pioneers' Party (Partai Pelopor)	Susilo Bambang Yudhoyono (Demokrat)	Boediono (Independent)
Indonesian Democratic Party of Devotion (PKDI)	Susilo Bambang Yudhoyono (Demokrat)	Boediono (Independent)
Prosperous Indonesia Party (PIS)	Susilo Bambang Yudhoyono (Demokrat)	Boediono (Independent)
New Indonesia Party of Struggle (PPIB)	Susilo Bambang Yudhoyono (Demokrat)	Boediono (Independent)
Indonesian Democratic Vanguard Party (PPDI)	Susilo Bambang Yudhoyono (Demokrat)	Boediono (Independent)
Golkar	Jusuf Kalla (Golkar)	Wiranto (Hanura)
People's Conscience Party (Hanura)	Jusuf Kalla (Golkar)	Wiranto (Hanura)
Source: Tempo

== Candidates ==
Nominees for president and vice president registered their candidacy at the central KPU office in Jakarta on 16 May. Candidates underwent physical and psychological evaluations at Gatot Subroto Army Hospital following registration. Personality tests were also conducted using the Minnesota Multiphasic Personality Inventory.

=== Megawati Sukarnoputri and Prabowo Subianto ===
1
2009 Indonesian Democratic Party of Struggle ticket
Megawati Sukarnoputri	Prabowo Subianto
for President	for Vice President
5th President of Indonesia (2001–2004)	Commander of Army Strategic Reserve Command (1998)
Campaign

The pair of Megawati Sukarnoputri and Prabowo Subianto is referred to colloquially by the Indonesian media as Mega–Pro. These two candidates belong to opposing ideological backgrounds. Prabowo's father, Sumitro Djojohadikusumo, was a political enemy of Megawati's father, former President Sukarno.

=== Susilo Bambang Yudhoyono and Boediono ===
2
2009 Democratic Party ticket
Susilo Bambang Yudhoyono	Boediono
for President	for Vice President
6th President of Indonesia (2004–2014)	Governor of Bank Indonesia (2008–2009)
Campaign

Initially, the pair of Susilo Bambang Yudhoyono and Boediono was referred to colloquially by the Indonesian media as SBY Berbudi. Three days after the slogan was announced, the campaign team had changed its name to SBY–Boediono due to concerns that the term berbudi was not as well known outside Java.

=== Jusuf Kalla and Wiranto ===
3
2009 Golkar ticket
Jusuf Kalla	Wiranto
for President	for Vice President
10th Vice President of Indonesia (2004–2009)	Coordinating Minister for Political & Security Affairs (1999–2000)
Campaign

The pair of Jusuf Kalla and Wiranto is referred to colloquially by the Indonesian media as JK–Win.

== Schedule ==
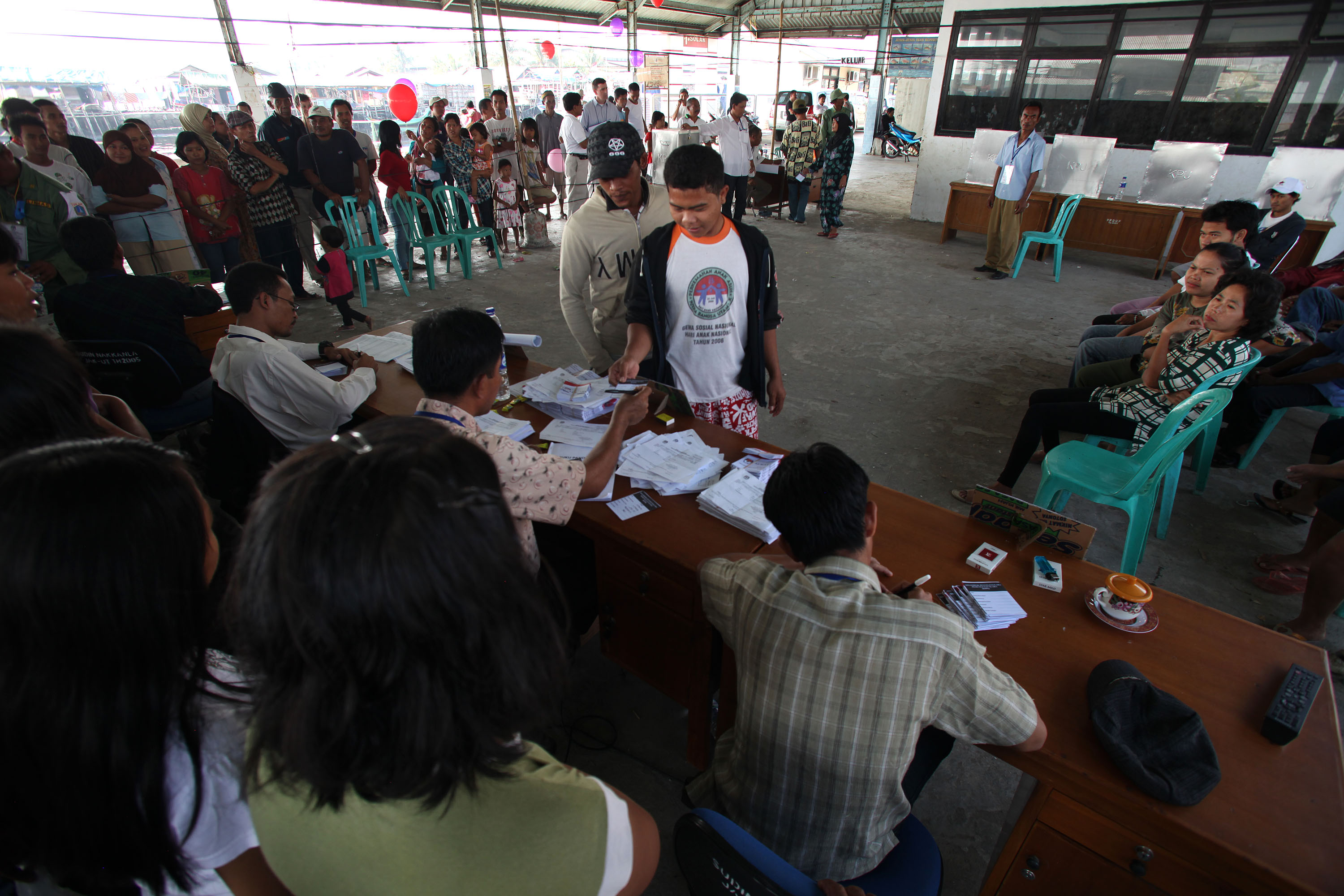
Voters in a polling station in North Jakarta receiving their ballot to vote in the election.

Candidates had to register from 10–16 May, with medical checks, which they all passed, from 11–15 May. The candidates were officially announced on 28 May and drew their ballot numbers at the KPU building on 31 May. Megawati–Prabowo drew number 1, SBY–Boediono number 2 and Kalla–Wiranto number 3.

The presidential election campaign began on 2 June and ran until 4 July, with mass rallies allowed from 12 June onwards. Those participating in the campaign were not allowed to question the basis of the Indonesian state, insult the race or religion of candidates, use threats or violence or give financial or material incentives to voters. There were a series of debates between 18 June and 2 July that were carried live on Indonesian television, three between the presidential candidates and two between the vice-presidential candidates. The topics for these two-hour debates were agreed in advance, and by common consent, did not explicitly include human rights issues.

After a two-day "silent period", voting took place on 8 July. National election results are due to be announced between 27 and 29 July. Following a period to allow for legal challenges, the final results will be announced between 1 and 12 August. If the election goes to a second round, the second campaign period will run from 15 July – 7 September, with the vote on 8 September. The final result is due to be announced on 8 October, with the president and vice-president being sworn before the general session of the People's Consultative Assembly (MPR) in 20 October.

== Results ==
Candidate	Running mate	Party	Votes	%
Susilo Bambang Yudhoyono	Boediono	Democratic Party	73,874,562	60.80
Megawati Sukarnoputri	Prabowo Subianto	Indonesian Democratic Party of Struggle	32,548,105	26.79
Jusuf Kalla	Wiranto	Golkar	15,081,814	12.41
Total			121,504,481	100.00
Valid votes			121,504,481	94.94
Invalid/blank votes			6,479,174	5.06
Total votes			127,983,655	100.00
Registered voters/turnout			176,367,056	72.57
Source: IFES, BPS

=== By province ===
Province	Yudhoyono		Megawati		Kalla	
Province	Votes	%	Votes	%	Votes	%
Aceh	2,093,567	93.25	53,835	2.40	97,717	4.35
North Sumatra	4,234,116	71.36	1,395,532	23.52	303,684	5.12
West Sumatra	1,828,155	79.93	134,662	5.89	324,336	14.18
Riau	1,502,684	64.07	555,564	23.69	287,067	12.24
Riau Islands	481,795	64.36	198,364	26.50	68,417	9.14
Bangka Belitung Islands	267,914	48.74	211,984	38.56	69,796	12.70
Jambi	927,038	59.41	455,239	29.17	178,223	11.42
South Sumatra	2,075,451	54.07	1,518,648	39.57	244,245	6.36
Bengkulu	545,327	64.14	197,566	23.24	107,338	12.62
Lampung	2,803,691	70.23	963,228	24.13	225,426	5.65
Jakarta	3,543,472	70.36	1,028,227	20.42	464,257	9.22
West Java	14,385,202	65.08	5,793,987	26.21	1,925,533	8.71
Central Java	9,281,132	53.06	6,694,981	38.28	1,514,316	8.66
Yogyakarta	1,219,187	61.71	555,071	28.10	201,389	10.19
East Java	11,732,298	60.32	5,916,628	30.42	1,801,836	9.26
Banten	3,350,243	65.06	1,389,285	26.98	410,270	7.97
Bali	822,951	43.03	992,815	51.92	96,571	5.05
West Nusa Tenggara	1,693,864	74.63	188,705	8.31	387,257	17.06
East Nusa Tenggara	1,125,592	52.73	881,761	41.30	127,441	5.97
West Kalimantan	1,235,144	54.03	848,603	37.12	202,459	8.86
Central Kalimantan	491,319	48.32	430,087	42.30	95,305	9.37
South Kalimantan	1,106,775	64.02	376,941	21.80	245,142	14.18
East Kalimantan	833,059	51.89	443,323	27.61	328,990	20.49
North Sulawesi	691,954	54.82	393,147	31.15	177,174	14.04
Central Sulawesi	669,413	50.53	110,627	8.35	544,758	41.12
South Sulawesi	1,335,115	31.62	167,970	3.98	2,719,701	64.41
Southeast Sulawesi	499,075	45.61	87,536	8.00	507,504	46.38
West Sulawesi	293,778	50.75	26,815	4.63	258,336	44.62
Gorontalo	241,222	44.22	35,225	6.46	269,057	49.32
North Maluku	214,757	38.94	112,173	20.34	224,583	40.72
Maluku	423,165	53.70	192,978	24.49	171,842	21.81
Papua	1,377,384	74.05	104,593	5.62	378,119	20.33
West Papua	313,577	73.95	44,484	10.49	65,982	15.56
Overseas	235,146	69.08	47,521	13.96	57,743	16.96
Total	73,874,562	60.80	32,548,105	26.79	15,081,814	12.41
Source: General Elections Commission

=== Quick count results ===
Organization	Megawati – Prabowo	SBY – Boediono	Jusuf Kalla – Wiranto
Cirus Surveyor Group	27.49%	60.20%	12.31%
Indonesian Survey Circle	27.36%	60.15%	12.49%
Indonesian Survey Institute	26.56%	60.85%	12.59%
Information Research Institute	27.02%	61.11%	11.87%
LP3ES	27.40%	60.28%	12.32%
Metro TV	27.45%	59.18%	13.37%
Puskaptis	28.16%	57.95%	13.89%
Source: The Jakarta Post, Metro TV, detikcom

== See also ==
- Elections in Indonesia
