= Aceh Unity Party =

Aceh Unity Party Partai Bersatu Aceh
- Chairman: Ahmad Farhan Hamid
- Secretary-General: Mohammad Saleh
- Founded: 27 January 2008
- Headquarters: Banda Aceh
- Ideology: Aceh regionalism
- Ballot number: 40
- DPR seats: N/A (New Party)

The Aceh Unity Party (Indonesian: Partai Bersatu Aceh) is a regional political party in Indonesia. The party's first leader was Farhan Hamid, a member of the legislature from the National Mandate Party (PAN). It contested the 2009 elections in the province of Aceh, but won only 16,602 votes, 0.77% of the Aceh vote. It failed to qualify for the 2014 elections.
