= National People's Concern Party =

National People's Concern Party Partai Peduli Rakyat Nasional
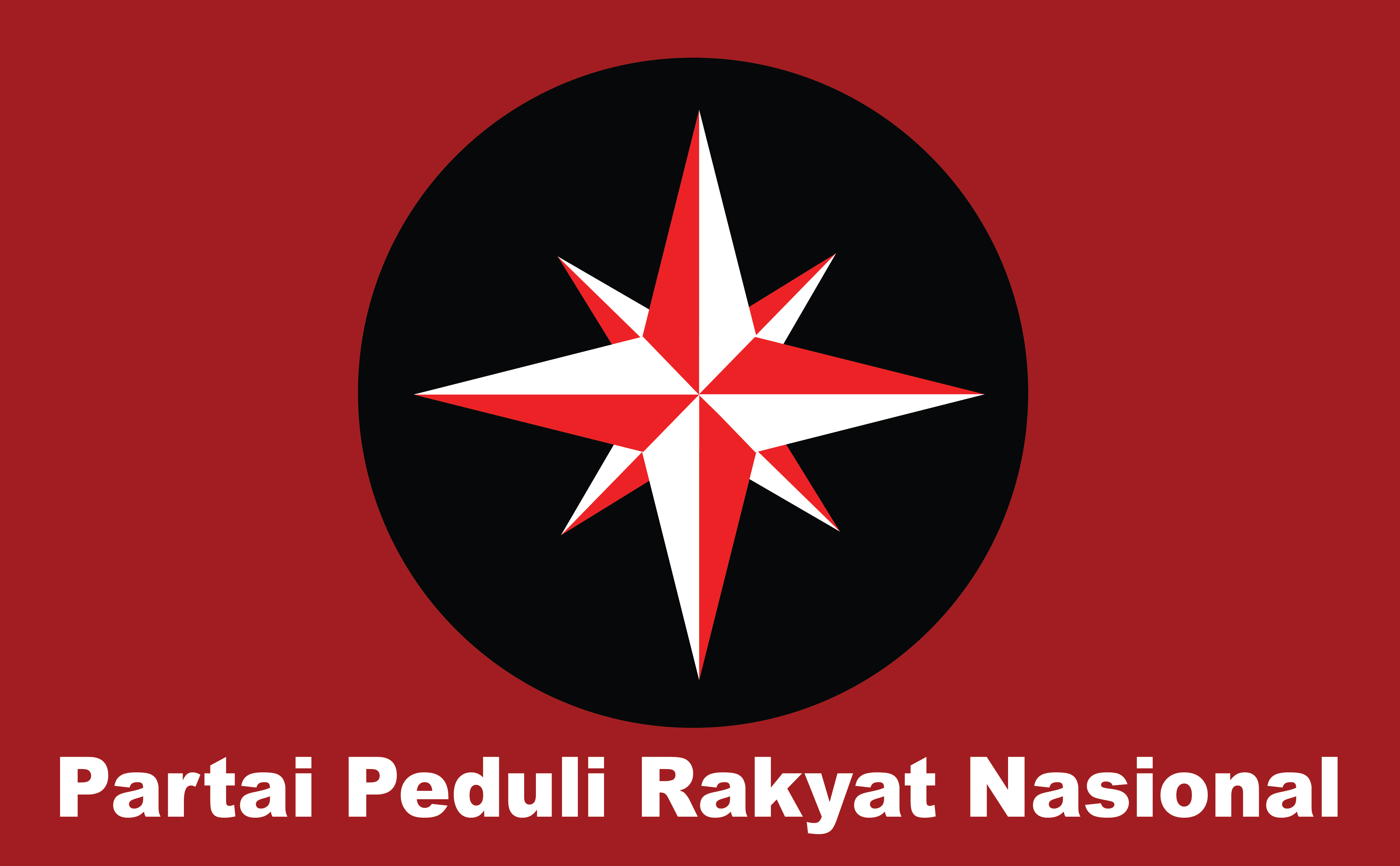
- Chairman: Amelia Achmad Yani
- Secretary-General: Albert Simanjuntak
- Founder: Sutan Raja DL Sitorus
- Founded: 20 January 2006
- Dissolved: 10 March 2013
- Merged into: People's Conscience Party
- Headquarters: Jakarta
- Ideology: Pancasila

The National People's Concern Party (Indonesian: Partai Peduli Rakyat Nasional) was a political party in Indonesia, headed by Amelia Achmad Yani, daughter of General Ahmad Yani. It contested the 2009 elections, but won only 1.2 percent of the vote, less than the 2.5 percent electoral threshold, so gained no seats in the People's Representative Council. The party intended to contest the 2014 elections, but failed to fulfil the ctteria set by the General Elections Commission, and along with nine other parties who also failed to qualify, decided to merge into the People's Conscience Party (Hanura).

== Election results ==
=== Presidential election results ===
Election	Ballot number	Candidate	Running mate	1st round (Total votes)	Share of votes	Outcome	2nd round (Total votes)	Share of votes	Outcome
2009	2	Susilo Bambang Yudhoyono	Boediono	70,997,833	53.15%	Elected			

=== Legislative election results ===
Election	Ballot number	Leader	Total seats won	Seat change	Total votes	Share of votes	Outcome of election
2009	25	Amelia Achmad Yani	0 / 560		1,260,794	1.21%	Governing coalition
