= Indonesian National Party – Marhaen Masses =

Indonesian National Party – Marhaen Masses Partai Nasional Indonesia – Massa Marhaen
- Abbreviation: PNI-MM
- Chairperson: Bachtar Oscha Chalik
- Founded: December 1998
- Dissolved: 20 May 2002
- Preceded by: Indonesian National Party
- Merged into: Indonesian National Party Marhaenism
- Ideology: Pancasila; Marhaenism; Indonesian nationalism Sukarnoism
- Political position: Left-wing

The Indonesian National Party – Marhaen Masses (Indonesian: Partai Nasional Indonesia – Massa Marhaen, PNI-MM) is one of the political parties in Indonesia.

== History ==
This party is the result of the merger of two PNI parties that were established during the reform era, namely the PNI under the leadership of Bachtar Oscha Chalik and the PNI under the leadership of Irawan Sunario. During the merger at the end of December 1998, Irawan Sunario said that the unification of PNI was a necessity. The PNI led by Bachtar Oscha Chalik aims to reunite the scattered PNI members. In December 1998, this led to an agreement that PNI-Supeni would merge with PNI-MM, forming a unity bloc. Even so, they contested on the 1999 General election but failed the verification process for the 2004 elections and did not contest following elections since.

== Election result ==
=== Legislative election results ===
Election	Ballot number	Leader	Seats		Total votes	Share of votes	Outcome of election
Election	Ballot number	Leader	No.	±	Total votes	Share of votes	Outcome of election
1999	30	Bachtar Oscha Chalik	1 / 462		345,720	0.33%	Opposition
