= National Front Party (Indonesia) =

National Front Party Partai Barisan Nasional (Barnas)
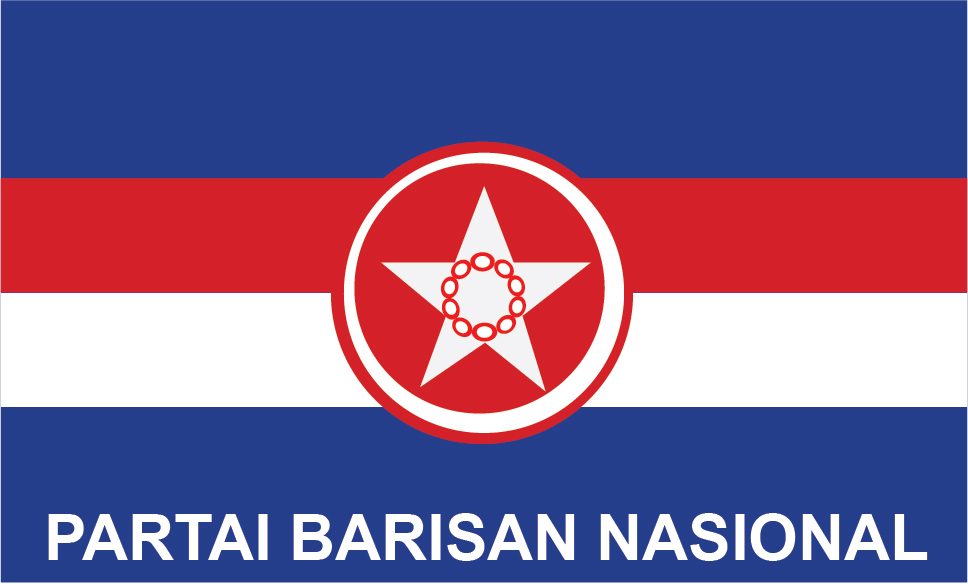
- Chairman: Vence Rumangkang
- Secretary-General: Dadang Garnida
- Founded: 1 October 2007
- Dissolved: 2012
- Split from: Democratic
- Merged into: Democratic
- Headquarters: Jakarta
- Ideology: Pancasila; Indonesian nationalism Anti-Australian sentiment Anti-Americanism
- Political position: Right-wing
- Ballot number: 06

Website
- partaibarisannasional.com

The National Front Party (Indonesian: Partai Barisan Nasional, Barnas) is a political party in Indonesia. It was founded by Vence Rumangkang, former member of the Democratic Party advisory board.

The party contested the 2009 elections, but won only 0.7 percent of the vote, less than the 2.5 percent electoral threshold, meaning it was awarded no seats in the People's Representative Council.

== Regional strength ==
In the legislative election held on 9 April 2009, support for Barnas was higher than the party's national average in the following provinces:

Aceh 0.9%

North Sumatra 0.9%

Bengkulu 1.1%

Riau 0.7%

Jambi 1.0%

South Sumatra 1.7%

Banten 0.8%

West Kalimantan 1.4%

Central Kalimantan 0.8%

West Nusa Tenggara 0.9%

East Nusa Tenggara 1.0%

West Sulawesi 0.7%

North Sulawesi 2.2%

South Sulawesi 0.8%

South East Sulawesi 1.2%

Maluku 0.9%

North Maluku 1.3%

West Papua 1.6%

== Election result ==
=== Presidential election results ===
Election	Ballot number	Candidate	Running mate	1st round (Total votes)	Share of votes	Outcome	2nd round (Total votes)	Share of votes	Outcome
2009	Neutral	Neutral							

=== Legislative election results ===
Election	Ballot number	Leader	Seats		Total votes	Share of votes	Outcome of election
Election	Ballot number	Leader	No.	±	Total votes	Share of votes	Outcome of election
2009	6	Ventje Rumangkang	0 / 560		760,712	0.73	Opposition
