= Indonesian Workers and Employers Party =

Political party in Indonesia

Indonesian Workers and Employers Party Partai Pengusaha dan Pekerja Indonesia
- Chairman: Daniel Hutapea
- Secretary-General: Rudy Prayitno
- Founder: Daniel Hutapea
- Founded: 11 April 2002
- Headquarters: Jakarta
- Ideology: Pancasila; Social democracy Social corporatism

The Indonesian Workers and Employers Party (Indonesian: Partai Pengusaha dan Pekerja Indonesia) is a political party in Indonesia. The party aims to integrate the struggle of Indonesian employers and workers. It contested the 2009 elections, but won only 0.7 percent of the vote, less than the 2.5 percent electoral threshold, meaning it was awarded no seats in the People's Representative Council.

== Regional strength ==
In the legislative election held on 9 April 2009, support for the PPPI was higher than the party's national average in the following provinces:

Aceh 0.9%

West Sumatra 0.7%

Bengkulu 1.0%

South Sumatra 0.7%

Lampung 0.8%

Yogyakarta 0.8%

West Kalimantan 0.8%

Central Kalimantan 0.9%

South Kalimantan 0.7%

East Kalimantan 0.9%

Bali 1.5%

West Nusa Tenggara 1.3%

East Nusa Tenggara 1.3%

West Sulawesi 3.0%

Central Sulawesi 0.8%

South East Sulawesi 1.0%

North Maluku 0.9%

West Papua 1.1%

== Election results ==
=== Presidential election results ===
Election	Ballot number	Candidate	Running mate	1st round (Total votes)	Share of votes	Outcome	2nd round (Total votes)	Share of votes	Outcome
2009	2	Susilo Bambang Yudhoyono	Boediono	70,997,833	53.15%	Elected			

=== Legislative election results ===
Election	Ballot number	Leader	Seats		Total votes	Share of votes	Outcome of election
Election	Ballot number	Leader	No.	±	Total votes	Share of votes	Outcome of election
2009	3	Daniel Hutapea	0 / 560		745,965	0.72%	Governing coalition
