= Prosperous Indonesia Party =

Prosperous Indonesia Party Partai Indonesia Sejahtera
- Chairman: Budiyanto Darmastono
- Secretary-General: Marnixon R. Cwila
- Founded: 7 July 2007
- Dissolved: 1 June 2011
- Merged into: National Unity Party; People's Conscience Party
- Headquarters: Jl. Slamet Riyadi No. 19, Matraman, East Jakarta, Jakarta
- Ideology: Pancasila; Populism
- Political position: Centre

Website

The Prosperous Indonesia Party (Indonesian: Partai Indonesia Sejahtera) was a political party in Indonesia. It contested the 2009 elections, but won only 0.3 percent of the vote, less than the 2.5 percent electoral threshold, meaning it was awarded no seats in the People's Representative Council. Following its poor result in the 2009 vote, the party joined nine other smaller parties to form the National Unity Party (Indonesian: Partai Persatuan Nasional). The party also attempted to contest the 2014 elections, but failed to fulfill the criteria set by the General Elections Commission, and along with nine other parties who also failed to qualify, decided to merge into the People's Conscience Party (Hanura).

== Election results ==
=== Presidential election results ===
Election	Ballot number	Candidate	Running mate	1st round (Total votes)	Share of votes	Outcome	2nd round (Total votes)	Share of votes	Outcome
2009	2	Susilo Bambang Yudhoyono	Boediono	70,997,833	53.15%	Elected			

=== Legislative election results ===
Election	Ballot number	Leader	Seats		Total votes	Share of votes	Outcome of election
Election	Ballot number	Leader	No.	±	Total votes	Share of votes	Outcome of election
2009	33	Budiyanto Darmastono	0 / 560		321,019	0.31%	Governing coalition
