= National Sun Party =

National Sun Party Partai Matahari Bangsa
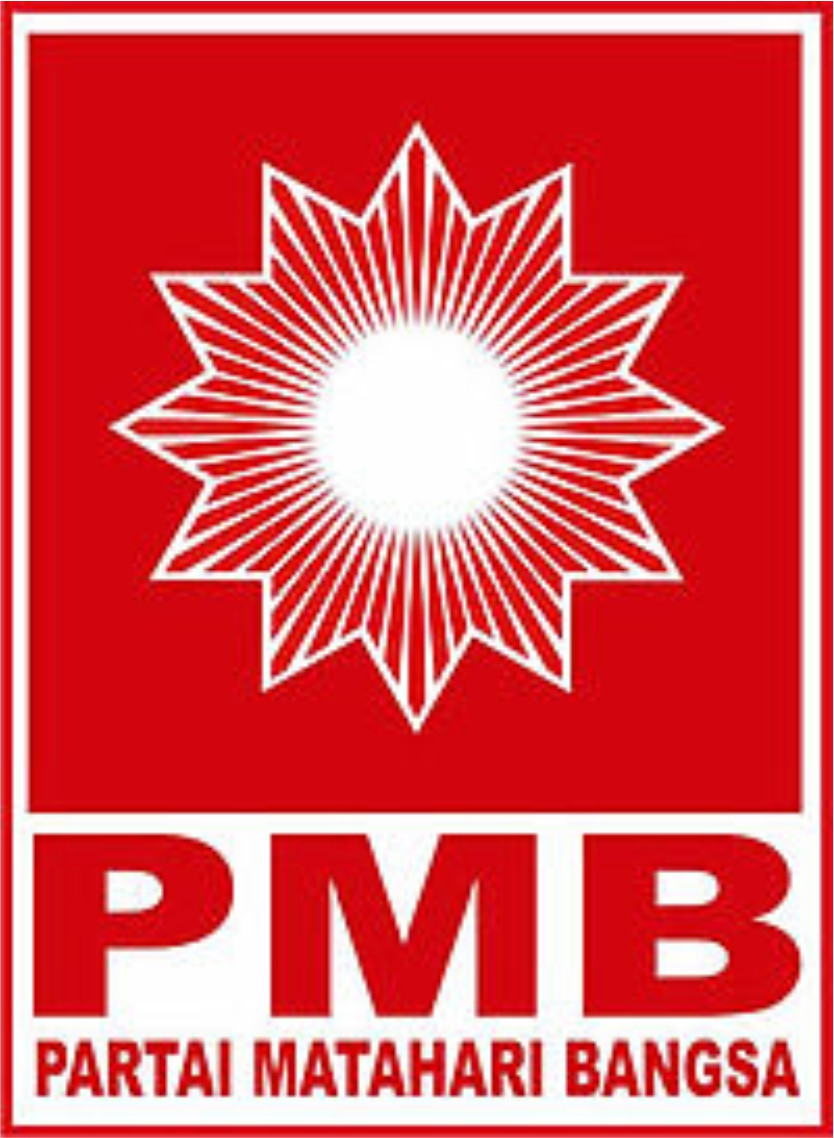
- Chairman: Muhammad Fazri Asnawi
- Secretary-General: Ahmad Rofiq
- Founders: Imam Addaruqutni; Ahmad Rofiq
- Founded: 16 December 2006
- Dissolved: 1 June 2011
- Merged into: National Unity Party
- Headquarters: Jl. Bukit Duri Tanjakan, Kav. 7, South Jakarta, Jakarta
- Ideology: Pancasila; Islamic modernism Moderate conservatism
- Political position: Centre to centre-right
- Ballot number: 18

Website
- http://www.pmb.or.id/

The National Sun Party (Indonesian: Partai Matahari Bangsa) was a political party in Indonesia. The party contested only in the 2009 elections.

The party was established by activists from the National Mandate Party (PAN) who were frustrated at the way their path to the leadership was blocked by the older generation. The party was founded by members of the Muhammadiyah, and some senior party members still belong to the organization, as do 75% of party members. The party hopes that younger people will assume leadership of Indonesia in 2014.

The party contested in 2009 elections with 30 parliamentary seats target. However, it won only 0.4 percent of the vote, less than the 2.5 percent electoral threshold, meaning it was awarded no seats in the People's Representative Council.

The party was known to be extinct by 2014. Party chairman Addaruqutni later joined a new minor party, Small and Medium Enterprises Party (UKM Party), and serving in the party's Advisory Council in 2021.

== Regional strength ==
In the legislative election held on 9 April 2009, support for the PMB was higher than the party's national average in the following provinces:

- Aceh 0.4%
- North Sumatra 0.8%
- West Sumatra 1.2%
- Bengkulu 1.2%
- Riau 0.8%
- Riau Islands 0.6%
- Jambi 1.1%
- South Sumatra 0.4%
- Banten 0.4%
- Central Kalimantan 0.5%
- South Kalimantan 0.6%
- West Nusa Tenggara 0.8%
- East Nusa Tenggara 0.6%
- West Sulawesi 0.4%
- Central Sulawesi 0.7%
- South East Sulawesi 0.6%
- Maluku 0.4%
- North Maluku 1.1%
- West Papua 1.3%

== Election results ==
=== Presidential election results ===
| Election | Ballot number | Candidate | Running mate | 1st round (Total votes) | Share of votes | Outcome | 2nd round (Total votes) | Share of votes | Outcome |
|---|---|---|---|---|---|---|---|---|---|
| 2009 | 2 | Susilo Bambang Yudhoyono | Boediono | 70,997,833 | 53.15% | Elected | | | |

=== Legislative election results ===
| Election | Ballot number | Leader | Seats | | Total votes | Share of votes | Outcome of election |
| Election | Ballot number | Leader | No. | ± | Total votes | Share of votes | Outcome of election |
|---|---|---|---|---|---|---|---|
| 2009 | 18 | Imam Addaruqutni | 0 / 560 | | 415,294 | 0.40% | Governing coalition |
