= Functional Party of Struggle =

Functional Party of Struggle Partai Karya Perjuangan
- Abbreviation: Pakar Pangan
- General Chairman: Jackson A. Kumaat
- Secretary General: Ambo Enre
- Founded: 7 July 2007
- Dissolved: 31 August 2012
- Merged into: Democratic
- Succeeded by: Nusantara Awakening Party
- Headquarters: Jakarta, Indonesia
- Ideology: Pancasila

Website
- partaikaryaperjuangan.org/

The Functional Party of Struggle (Indonesian: Partai Karya Perjuangan, Pakar Pangan; lit. 'Creative Party of Struggle, Food Expert') was a political party in Indonesia. It contested the 2009 elections, but received only 0.3 percent of the vote, well below the threshold of 2.5% of the political votes, and was awarded no seats in the People's Representative Council. The party was established by Lt. Gen (ret) Muhammad Yasin and members of Susilo Bambang Yudhoyono's 2004 election campaign team. Most of its election candidates were retired military officers. On 31 August 2012, the party officially merged into the Democratic Party. In 2021, the party was taken over and converted into the Nusantara Awakening Party.

== Election result ==
=== Presidential election results ===
| Election | Ballot number | Candidate | Running mate | 1st round (Total votes) | Share of votes | Outcome | 2nd round (Total votes) | Share of votes | Outcome |
|---|---|---|---|---|---|---|---|---|---|
| 2009 | 1 | Megawati Sukarnoputri | Prabowo Subianto | 32,548,105 | 26.79% | Lost | | | |

=== Legislative election results ===
| Election | Ballot number | Leader | Seats | | Total votes | Share of votes | Outcome of election |
| Election | Ballot number | Leader | No. | ± | Total votes | Share of votes | Outcome of election |
|---|---|---|---|---|---|---|---|
| 2009 | 17 | Jackson Kumaat | 0 / 560 | 0 | 351,571 | 0.34% | Governing coalition |
