= Indonesian Nahdlatul Community Party =

Islamic political party in Indonesia

Indonesian Nahdlatul Community Party Partai Persatuan Nahdlatul Ummah Indonesia
- Chairman: Yusuf Humaidi
- Secretary-General: Saepul Rizal
- Founded: 16 August 1998
- Split from: Nahdlatul Ulama
- Headquarters: Jakarta
- Ideology: Pancasila; Conservatism; Islamic democracy
- Political position: Centre-right
- Ballot number: 42
- DPR seats: 0

The Indonesian Nahdlatul Community Party (Indonesian: Partai Persatuan Nahdlatul Ummah Indonesia) is a minor conservative political party in Indonesia.

It was originally established on 16 August 1998 as the Nahdatul Ummat Party (Partai Nahdatul Ummat) and took part in the 1999 legislative election, winning 5 seats in the People's Representative Council. However, Law No. 31/2002 on Political Parties stated that parties failing to win at least 3 percent of the vote were not eligible to participate in the next election. Therefore, the party changed its name and on 5 March 2003 the Indonesian Nahdlatul Community Party was officially founded.

In the 2004 legislative election, the party won 0.8% of the popular vote and lost all 5 seats. After initially failing to qualify, following a lawsuit the party won the right to contest the 2009 elections, in which it won only 0.14 percent of the vote, lower from the electoral threshold of at least 2,5%, again without any seats of the People's Representative Council.

== Election results ==
=== Presidential election results ===
Election	Ballot number	Candidate	Running mate	1st round (Total votes)	Share of votes	Outcome	2nd round (Total votes)	Share of votes	Outcome
2004	1	Wiranto	Salahuddin Wahid	26,286,788	22.15%	Lost	Eliminated		
2009	1	Megawati Sukarnoputri	Prabowo Subianto	32,548,105	26.79%	Lost			

=== Legislative election results ===
Election	Ballot number	Leader	Seats		Votes		Outcome of election
Election	Ballot number	Leader	No.	±	Total	%	Outcome of election
1999	25	Syukron Ma'mun	5 / 462		679,179	0.64%	Opposition
2004	12	Syukron Ma'mun	0 / 550	▼5	895.610	0.79%	Opposition
2009	42	Yusuf Humaidi	0 / 560	0	146.779	0.14%	Opposition
