= Archipelago Republic Party =

Archipelago Republic Party Partai Republika Nusantara
- Abbreviation: Republika(N)
- Chairman: Syarir MS
- Secretary-General: Yus Sudarso
- Founded: 20 May 2007
- Dissolved: 10 March 2013
- Merged into: Hanura
- Headquarters: Jakarta
- Ideology: Pancasila; Secularism; Indonesian nationalism
- Political position: Centre to centre-right
- DPR seats: 0

The Archipelago Republic Party (Indonesian: Partai Republika Nusantara, abbr. Republika(N)) was a political party in Indonesia established in 2007. It contested the 2009 election on a platform of simplification of the bureaucracy, reforms to education and prioritization of maritime development. However, it won only 0.6 percent of the vote, less than the 2.5 percent electoral threshold, meaning it was awarded no seats in the People's Representative Council. The party intended to contest the 2014 elections, but failed to fulfill the criteria set by the General Elections Commission, and along with nine other parties who also failed to qualify, decided to merge into the People's Conscience Party (Hanura).
