= Indonesian Youth Party =

Political party in Indonesia, 2007–2013

Indonesian Youth Party Partai Pemuda Indonesia
- Abbreviation: PPI
- Leader: Hasanuddin Yusuf (Chairman)
- Founded: 5 March 2007
- Dissolved: 2013
- Merged into: Hanura
- Headquarters: Jakarta
- Ideology: Pancasila; Constitutionalism; Secularism; Catch-all; Reformism
- Political position: Centre to centre-left
- Ballot number: 14

Website
- partaipemudaindonesia.or.id

The Indonesian Youth Party (Indonesian: Partai Pemuda Indonesia, PPI) was a political party in Indonesia. It contested the 2009 elections with a platform of motivating young people to participate in national development. The party won only 0.4 percent of the vote, less than the 2.5 percent electoral threshold, meaning it was awarded no seats in the People's Representative Council. Following its poor result in the 2009 vote, the party joined nine other smaller parties to form the National Unity Party (Indonesian: Partai Persatuan Nasional). The party also attempted to contest the 2014 elections, but failed to fulfill the criteria set by the General Elections Commission, and along with nine other parties who also failed to qualify, decided to merge into the People's Conscience Party (Hanura).
