= Indonesian Democratic Party of Devotion =

Indonesian Democratic Party of Devotion Partai Kasih Demokrasi Indonesia
- Chairman: Roy Rening
- Secretary-General: Random Gultom
- Founded: 22 August 1998
- Headquarters: Jakarta
- Ideology: Pancasila
- Ballot number: 32
- DPR seats: 0

Website
- pkdindonesia.com

The Indonesian Democratic Party of Devotion (Indonesian: Partai Kasih Demokrasi Indonesia) was a political party in Indonesia. It was one of two Christian parties contesting the 2009 elections.

The party was originally established in 1998 as the Catholic Democratic Party. In the 1999 legislative election, the party won one seat in the legislature. For the 2004 election, it had to change its name in order to meet the requirements to contest the vote, but the party eventually failed the verification process. It then joined together with other parties and changed its name to the Indonesian Democratic Party of Devotion. The party targeted the 14-15 million voters in Christian regions of Indonesia in the 2009 legislative election, hoping to gain 30 percent of the votes in those areas. However, the party won only 0.3 percent of the national vote, less than the 2.5 percent electoral threshold, meaning it was awarded no seats in the People's Representative Council. Following its poor result in the 2009 vote, the party joined nine other smaller parties to form the National Unity Party (Indonesian: Partai Persatuan Nasional).
