= 2009 Indonesian legislative election =

- 9 April 2009
- All 560 seats in the House of Representatives; 281 seats needed for a majority
- Turnout: 70.99% (▼13.08pp)
Party	Leader	Vote %	Seats	+/–
Demokrat	Hadi Utomo	20.81	148	+93
Golkar	Jusuf Kalla	14.45	106	−22
PDI-P	Megawati Sukarnoputri	14.01	94	−15
PKS	Tifatul Sembiring	7.89	57	+12
PAN	Soetrisno Bachir	6.03	46	−7
PPP	Suryadharma Ali	5.33	38	−20
PKB	Muhaimin Iskandar	4.95	28	−24
Gerindra	Prabowo Subianto	4.46	26	New
Hanura	Wiranto	3.77	17	New
This lists parties that won seats. See the complete results below.
Results by electoral district
Speaker before	Speaker after
Agung Laksono; Golkar	Marzuki Alie; Demokrat

Legislative elections were held in Indonesia on 9 April 2009 for 132 seats of the Regional Representative Council (DPD) and 560 seats of the People's Representative Council (DPR). A total of 38 parties met the requirements to be allowed to participate in the national elections, with a further six regional parties contesting in Aceh only. The Democratic Party of incumbent President Susilo Bambang Yudhoyono won the largest share of the vote, followed by Golkar and the Indonesian Democratic Party of Struggle.

== Background ==
On 5 October 2004 three regencies were carved out of the province of South Sulawesi to form West Sulawesi as the 33rd province of Indonesia. Because this occurred after the 2004 legislative election, West Sulawesi was not represented in the DPD during the 2004–2009 period.

There were talks on increasing the number of seats in the DPR as early as September 2007. In a meeting of a committee to draft changes to the Constitution, various factions within the government proposed an increase to between 560 and 600 seats total. On 18 February 2008, the committee agreed on a 10-seat increase in the council to 560 total seats in order to accommodate for the new province of West Sulawesi and population increase.

The number of registered voters was finalised at 171,265,442, a 15.7% increase from the 2004 legislative election. This number represents almost 74% of the total population of Indonesia A total of 121,588,366 ballots were cast, of which 14.4% were declared invalid. According to the KPU, the number of registered votes who did not vote increased from 15.93% to 29% compared to the previous election.

== Schedule ==
Under General Election Commission (KPU) Regulation No. 20/2008, the first phase of the election was finalising the list of voters. This was completed on 24 October 2008 with 170,022,239 people announced as eligible voters. However, a month later, the KPU announced that due to errors in entering data, and after eliminating multiple counting, the final total was 171,068,667, including 1,509,892 overseas voters. It changed the final count once again on 12 March 2009 to 171,265,442 national and overseas voters after investigating allegations of voters left unregistered.

The election campaign began on 12 July 2008 and ran until 5 April 2009, followed by a "quiet period" of three days, during which all election posters, banners and other materials had to be removed from public places. However, TV advertising was permitted to continue.

The legislative election took place on 9 April, and results were announced one month later. The new members of the DPD and the DPR will be sworn in on 1 October.

== Parties ==
Over 60 parties registered for the elections, but only 34 originally met the eligibility requirements. However, on 15 August 2008, following a successful legal challenge, another four parties were permitted to join the contest, making 38 in total. A total of 11,219 candidates vied for seats in the DPR, and 1,116 candidates vied for seats in the DPD. Among the requirements for parties is that 30% of candidates are women. The Constitutional Court also lifted the restriction on former members of the Indonesian Communist Party to stand as candidates in the legislative election.

Only parties or coalitions of parties tallying 25% of the national vote or winning 112 seats (20%) in the 560-member DPR may nominate a candidate in the presidential election to be held in July 2009. The introduction of a parliamentary threshold also meant that only parties receiving more than 2.5% of the popular vote would be seated in the DPR.

== Campaign ==
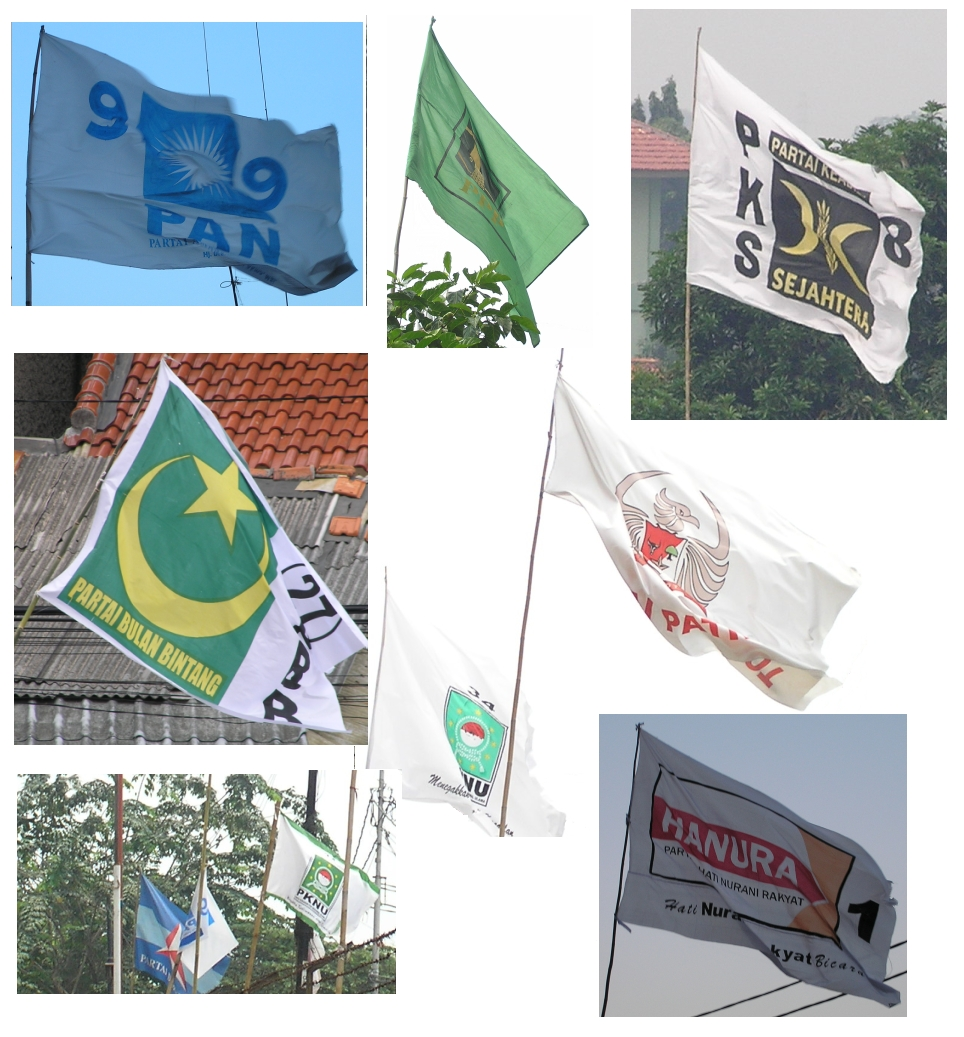
Party flags flying in Jakarta during the first phase of the campaign.

Although the election campaign began on 12 July 2008, before 16 March, it was limited to invitation-only meetings, advertisements in the media and the distribution of campaign materials. The public campaign ran until 5 April 2009. Participants in the campaign were banned from calling into question the ideological or constitutional basis of the state as well as its form as a unitary republic. Campaign donations for DPR candidates were limited to one billion Indonesian rupiah from individuals and Rp5 billion from organisations, while the corresponding limits for DPD candidates were Rp250 million from individuals and Rp500 million from organisations.

In contrast to previous parliamentary elections that were closed list, Indonesia instituted an open list system for this election. Individuals campaigned not only as members of their political party but also on their own merits, and some who were not listed at the top of the party's list won seats.

== Controversies ==
The introduction of a parliamentary threshold rule met objections from smaller political parties. By limiting seating in the DPR to parties receiving 2.5% of the popular vote, smaller parties would be at a disadvantage. A request filed by 11 parties to review the rule was rejected by the Constitutional Court.

On 28 April lawmakers from six parties in the DPR submitted a formal proposal to investigate negligence and discrimination during voter registration as the KPU continued to dismiss challenges to results of its vote count. The KPU also requested that any investigation by the Corruption Eradication Commission (KPK) on the failure of the Rp40 billion (US$3.68 million) electronic vote-counting system to be postponed until after presidential elections in July. Despite these allegations, the Constitutional Court declined to open hearing to disputes regarding the voter list.

An investigation by the country's National Commission on Human Rights estimated that between 25 and 40% of eligible voters were not able to exercise their constitutional right to vote during the legislative elections. The commission's report pointed out weaknesses in the organisational structure of the KPU and the lack of a budgetary policy for organising elections.

In order to continue updating the voter registration list for the July presidential election, the Ministry of Finance provided the KPU with an additional Rp19.34 billion (US$1.9 million) in funds.

== Conduct ==
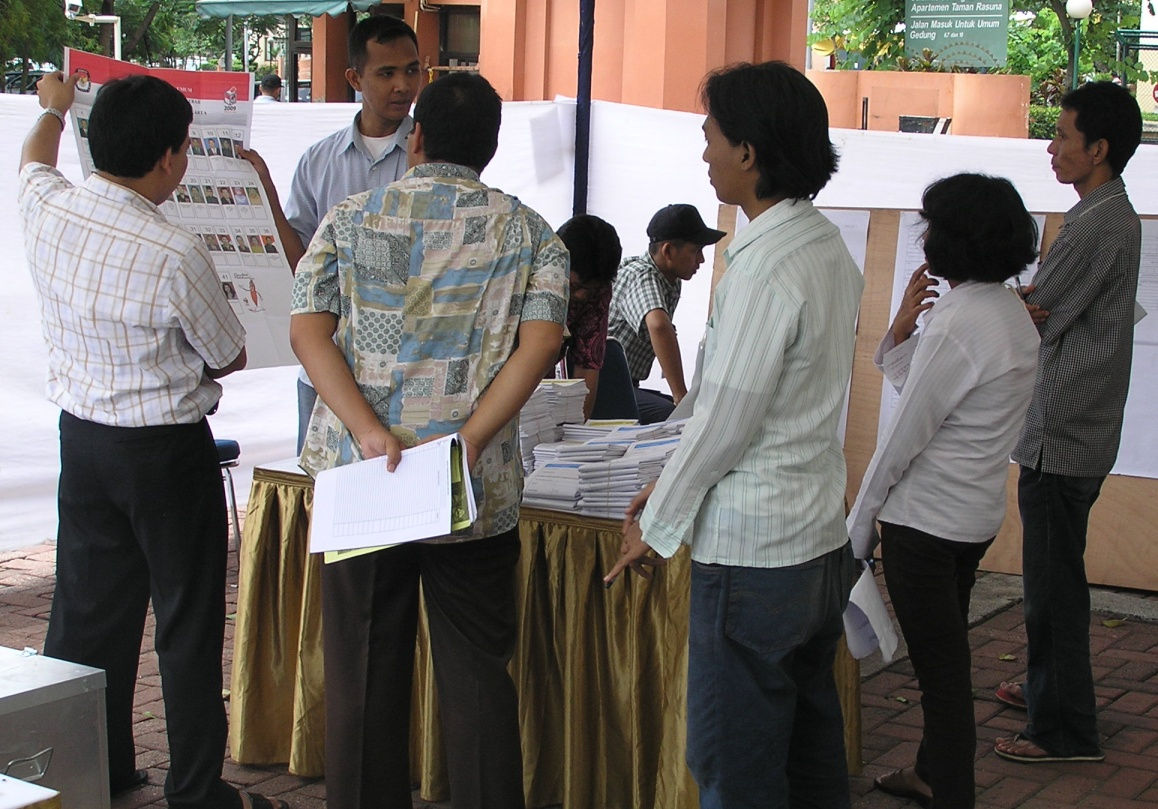
Polling stations conducted manual counts of ballots cast.

Polling stations were scheduled to open at 7 am and to remain open until noon local time on 9 April. However, several stations experienced delays with the opening time and had to extend polling hours in order to accommodate voters who had not yet cast their ballots. Each polling station was scheduled to begin counting election results at noon local time and report them to the KPU. Ballot counting continued until 9 May, when the KPU would certify its results.

In Aceh, eight international organisations observed the elections:

- Carter Center
- European Union
- International Republican Institute (IRI)
- Australian Embassy to Indonesia
- International Foundation for Electoral Systems
- Embassy of the United States to Indonesia
- Asian Network for Free Elections (ANFREL)
- National Democratic Institute for International Affairs

== Results ==
Preliminary results indicated that the Democratic Party of President Susilo Bambang Yudhoyono led the popular vote over Golkar, the party of incumbent Vice President Jusuf Kalla, and the Indonesian Democratic Party of Struggle of former president Megawati Sukarnoputri.

Party	Votes	%	Seats	+/–
Democratic Party	21,655,295	20.81	148	+93
Golkar	15,031,497	14.45	106	–22
Indonesian Democratic Party of Struggle	14,576,388	14.01	94	–15
Prosperous Justice Party	8,204,946	7.89	57	+12
National Mandate Party	6,273,462	6.03	46	–7
United Development Party	5,544,332	5.33	38	–20
National Awakening Party	5,146,302	4.95	28	–24
Gerindra Party	4,642,795	4.46	26	New
People's Conscience Party	3,925,620	3.77	17	New
Crescent Star Party	1,864,642	1.79	0	–11
Ulema National Awakening Party	1,527,509	1.47	0	New
Prosperous Peace Party	1,522,032	1.46	0	–13
Concern for the Nation Functional Party	1,461,375	1.40	0	–2
Reform Star Party	1,264,150	1.21	0	–14
National People's Concern Party	1,260,950	1.21	0	New
Indonesian Justice and Unity Party	936,133	0.90	0	–1
Democratic Renewal Party	896,959	0.86	0	New
National Front Party	760,712	0.73	0	New
Indonesian Workers and Employers Party	745,965	0.72	0	New
Democratic Nationhood Party	671,356	0.65	0	–4
Archipelago Republic Party	631,814	0.61	0	New
Regional Unity Party	553,299	0.53	0	0
Patriot Party	547,798	0.53	0	0
Indonesian National Populist Fortress Party	468,856	0.45	0	0
Sovereignty Party	438,030	0.42	0	New
Indonesian Youth Party	415,563	0.40	0	New
National Sun Party	415,294	0.40	0	New
Functional Party of Struggle	351,571	0.34	0	New
Pioneers' Party	345,092	0.33	0	–3
Indonesian Democratic Party of Devotion	325,771	0.31	0	New
Prosperous Indonesia Party	321,019	0.31	0	New
Indonesian National Party Marhaenism	317,433	0.31	0	–1
Labour Party	265,369	0.26	0	0
New Indonesia Party of Struggle	198,803	0.19	0	0
Indonesian Nahdlatul Community Party	146,831	0.14	0	0
Indonesian Unity Party	141,558	0.14	0	0
Indonesian Democratic Vanguard Party	139,988	0.13	0	–1
Freedom Party	111,609	0.11	0	0
Total	104,048,118	100.00	560	+10
Valid votes	104,048,118	85.57		
Invalid/blank votes	17,540,248	14.43		
Total votes	121,588,366	100.00		
Registered voters/turnout	171,265,442	70.99		
Source: Pemilu 2009 dalam angka

=== By province ===
Province	Total seats	Seats won								
Province	Total seats	Demokrat	Golkar	PDI-P	PKS	PAN	PPP	PKB	Gerindra	Hanura
Aceh	13	7	2	0	2	1	1	0	0	0
North Sumatra	30	10	5	4	3	3	2	0	1	2
West Sumatra	14	5	3	0	2	2	2	0	0	0
Riau	11	2	4	1	1	1	1	1	0	0
Riau Islands	3	1	1	0	1	0	0	0	0	0
Jambi	7	2	1	1	0	2	0	0	0	1
South Sumatra	17	3	4	3	2	1	1	0	2	1
Bengkulu	4	1	1	0	1	1	0	0	0	0
Lampung	18	4	3	3	2	2	0	1	2	1
Jakarta	21	8	2	3	4	1	1	0	2	0
Banten	22	6	4	3	3	1	3	0	1	1
West Java	91	28	15	16	12	3	8	3	4	2
Central Java	77	14	11	19	7	8	7	6	4	1
Yogyakarta	8	2	1	2	1	1	0	1	0	0
East Java	87	21	11	18	6	7	4	13	5	2
Bali	9	2	2	4	0	0	0	0	1	0
West Nusa Tenggara	10	3	2	1	1	1	1	0	0	1
East Nusa Tenggara	13	3	4	2	0	1	0	0	2	1
West Kalimantan	10	2	2	3	1	1	1	0	0	0
Central Kalimantan	6	1	1	2	0	1	1	0	0	0
South Kalimantan	11	2	2	1	2	1	2	1	0	0
East Kalimantan	8	2	2	1	1	0	1	0	1	0
North Sulawesi	6	1	2	2	0	1	0	0	0	0
Central Sulawesi	6	1	2	1	1	0	0	0	0	1
South Sulawesi	24	6	8	0	3	3	1	0	1	2
Southeast Sulawesi	5	2	1	0	1	1	0	0	0	0
West Sulawesi	3	1	1	0	0	1	0	0	0	0
Gorontalo	3	1	1	0	0	0	1	0	0	0
Maluku	4	1	1	1	0	0	0	1	0	0
North Maluku	3	1	1	1	0	0	0	0	0	0
Papua	10	3	3	1	0	1	0	1	0	1
West Papua	3	1	2	0	0	0	0	0	0	0
Total	560	148	106	94	57	46	38	28	26	17
Source: Pemilu 2009 dalam angka

=== Electoral disputes ===
Popular vote results were certified as scheduled on 9 May by the KPU, which also announced that only nine parties would gain seats in the DPR based on rules of the parliamentary threshold. However, party seating could not be certified immediately after several parties raised concerns over the KPU's vote-counting methods. Seating distribution was eventually revised on 14 May after the KPU admitted to "human error" when displaying the original results. These results will be certified at a later date.

The Constitutional Court began its hearings for approximately 620 election disputes on 18 May. Cases involved both elections for DPR and DPD candidates. A lawyer for a DPD candidate stated that all but two of the political parties accepted the results of that election in the province of Papua. On 11 June, the Court ordered the KPU to revise its calculations for allocating seats in the DPR on the grounds that the KPU has misinterpreted its own regulations. Though the KPU initially refused to abide by the Court's ruling, it reversed its decision less than 24 hours later but would not begin work on the revision before 24 June. As many as 16 candidates who have been declared as victors in their respective districts could lose their seats, including DPR Speaker Agung Laksono.

Election reruns will also be held in parts of the provinces of Papua and North Sumatra on 8 July, the same day as the presidential election.

== Analysis ==
Election results saw a drop in votes for Islamic parties compared to 2004 when they collected a total of 38% of votes. Although 87% of Indonesia's population are followers of Islam, the four Islamic parties in this election (the United Development Party, the National Mandate Party, the Prosperous Justice Party, and the National Awakening Party) only collected 24% of votes. The Prosperous Justice Party gained 12 seats but fell short of its goal of garnering 15% of total votes cast.

In addition to growing concerns for the economy, observers believed that many voters shied away from Islamism after several local elections resulted in victories for Islamic parties. Once elected, these officials began experimenting with sharia, or Islamic law, prompting resistance among the local population. Most notably, legislators had proposed an anti-pornography bill in 2006 to gain the favour of religious groups. However, the bill's vagueness meant that practising yoga could be construed as a pornographic action. Additionally, several corruption charges were brought against officials representing Islamic parties, which had previously been considered clean compared to other political parties.

The trend of voting for secular parties was not limited to Islam-based parties. The Christianity-based Prosperous Peace Party received only 1.48% of votes, and Catholicism-based Indonesian Democratic Party of Devotion received 0.31%.

== Aftermath ==
The Democratic Party was the only party to have fulfilled the requirements needed to nominate its own candidates for president and vice president in the July election. It won 150 seats in the DPR, well over the 112 needed to nominate a candidate. No party met the criterion of achieving 25% of the popular vote. By 16 May, three coalitions submitted candidates for the presidential election. The coalition led by the Democratic Party submitted President Susilo Bambang Yudhoyono and Bank Indonesia Governor Boediono as running mates. Golkar and the People's Conscience Party submitted Vice President Jusuf Kalla and retired General Wiranto as running mates. Finally, the coalition led by the Indonesian Democratic Party – Struggle and the Great Indonesia Movement Party submitted former President Megawati Sukarnoputri and retired General Prabowo Subianto as running mates.

It initially appeared that Golkar would enter into a coalition with the Indonesian Democratic Party – Struggle to challenge the Democratic Party in the July presidential election. However, talks were broken off on 13 April 2009, with Golkar reportedly more interested in continuing the coalition with Yudhoyono rather than risk being cut off from power completely. Yudhoyono was also in talks with Islamist parties in a bid to form a coalition controlling more than half the seats in parliament.

By late April 2009, Golkar was in talks with smaller parties to gain the votes it lacked to be able to nominate Kalla as a presidential candidate. A ten-party coalition was formed on 1 May, consisting of Golkar, the Indonesian Democratic Party – Struggle, the Great Indonesia Movement Party, the People's Conscience Party, the Prosperous Peace Party, the Reform Star Party, the Ulema National Awakening Party, the National People's Concern Party, the Labor Party and the Indonesian Nahdlatul Community Party. Two parties who had been considering joining the coalition, the National Mandate Party and the United Development Party, in the end, decided not to join.

Members of the new legislature took the oath of office on 1 October for a five-year term in an inauguration ceremony whose cost was estimated at US$4.7 million. The DPR elected Marzuki Alie of the Democratic Party as its Speaker and announced a total of nine factions in the legislature. West Sumatra representative Irman Gusman was elected chairman of the DPD for the new five-year term. At the same time, several party coalitions discussed nominations for MPR Chairman, including Taufiq Kiemas, husband of former President Megawati Sukarnoputri. He was elected to the position on 3 October after receiving support from all nine political parties which were allocated seats in the DPR. The majority of DPD members walked out of the election after a proposal for two of the four deputy seats to be allocated solely to DPD members was rejected.
