= People's Conscience Party =

Political party in Indonesia

People's Conscience Party Partai Hati Nurani Rakyat
- Abbreviation: Hanura
- General Chairman: Oesman Sapta Odang
- Secretary-General: Benny Rhamdani
- Founder: Wiranto
- Founded: 21 December 2006; 19 years ago
- Split from: Golkar
- Headquarters: Jakarta
- Student wing: Sapma Hanura (Hanura Student Unit)
- Youth wing: Lasmura (Hanura Young Army)
- Women's wing: Perempuan Hanura (Hanura Women); Srikandi Hanura (Hanura Sikhandi)
- Membership (2022): 362,891
- Ideology: Pancasila; Secularism; Liberalism; Indonesian nationalism Corporatism
- Political position: Centre
- National affiliation: None (de jure since 2024) Faction: KIM Plus (2024–present); Alliance of Parties (2023–2024); Onward Indonesia Coalition (2018–2023); Great Indonesia Coalition (2014–2018); JK-Wiranto (Golkar Coalition) (2009)
- Anthem: Mars Hanura (Hanura March)
- Ballot number: 10
- DPR seats: 0 / 580
- DPRD I seats: 42 / 2,372
- DPRD II seats: 486 / 17,510

Website
- partaihanura.or.id

The People's Conscience Party (Indonesian: Partai Hati Nurani Rakyat), better known by its abbreviation, Hanura, is a political party in Indonesia. It was established following a meeting in Jakarta on 13–14 December 2006 and first headed by former Indonesian National Armed Forces commander Wiranto.

The party lost its seats in the House of Representatives (DPR) after a poor performance in the 2019 general election.

== Background ==
After being eliminated in the first round of the 2004 Indonesian presidential election, Wiranto was "traumatized" by his defeat and decided not to run for the presidency without his own political vehicle. He resigned from Golkar Party in 2006 and established Hanura, targeting voters who had supported him in 2004. The party conducted a door-to-door grassroots campaign. The basis of its support is in West Java, Gorontalo, South Sulawesi, North Sulawesi, West Nusa Tenggara and Bali The party's target in the 2009 elections was 15 percent of the vote.

The result of the Indonesian legislative election, 2009 was announced on 9 May 2009. Hanura won 3.77 percent of the national vote, which translated into 18 legislative seats. The party had supported Golkar chairman Jusuf Kalla for the presidency, in which both parties lost out to the Indonesian Democratic Party-Struggle and the Democratic Party. Hanura chairman Wiranto was his vice-presidential candidate, despite Wiranto's previous statement that he would not settle for the vice-presidency. Following cabinet reshuffle in July 2016, Wiranto was appointed as coordinating minister for politics, legal and security affairs, prompting the party to hold a convention to select Wiranto's successor as party chairman.

In Indonesia's 2019 general election, Hanura won only 1.54% of the vote and lost its 16 seats in the national parliament.

On 18 December 2019, Wiranto resigned as chairman of the Hanura Board of Trustees, saying he wanted to focus on his appointment as chairman of the Presidential Advisory Council. He denied having been pushed out of the party, but he acknowledged the party had suffered internal conflict and that he was not invited to a recent national conference.

== Leaders ==
No.	Name (Lifespan)	Portrait	Constituency / title	Took office	Left office	Election results	Government		
No.	Name (Lifespan)	Portrait	Constituency / title	Took office	Left office	Election results	Party	President	Term
Split from: Golkar Party (Wiranto's faction)
1	Wiranto (born 1947)		Coordinating Minister for Political, Legal and Security Affairs (Note: since 27 July 2016)	21 December 2006	21 December 2016	2006 Unopposed 2010 Unopposed	PD	Yudhoyono	2004-2014
1	Wiranto (born 1947)		Coordinating Minister for Political, Legal and Security Affairs	21 December 2006	21 December 2016	2006 Unopposed 2010 Unopposed	PDIP	Widodo	2014-2024
2	Oesman Sapta Odang (born 1950)		Reg for West Kalimantan	21 December 2016	Incumbent	2016 Unopposed 2019 Unopposed 2024 Unopposed	PDIP	Widodo	2014-2024
2	Oesman Sapta Odang (born 1950)		Reg for West Kalimantan	21 December 2016	Incumbent	2016 Unopposed 2019 Unopposed 2024 Unopposed	Gerindra	Subianto	Incumbent

== Election results ==
=== Legislative election results ===
Election	Ballot number	Leader	Seats		Total votes	Share of votes	Outcome of election
Election	Ballot number	Leader	No.	±	Total votes	Share of votes	Outcome of election
2009	1	Wiranto	17 / 560		3,925,620	3.77%	Opposition
2014	10	Wiranto	16 / 560	▼1	6,579,498	5.26%	Governing coalition
2019	13	Oesman Sapta Odang	0 / 575	▼16	2,161,507	1.54%	Governing coalition
2024	10	Oesman Sapta Odang	0 / 580	0	1,094,599	0.72%	Coalition suplly

=== Presidential election results ===
Election	Ballot number	Pres. candidate	Running mate	1st round (Total votes)	Share of votes	Outcome	2nd round (Total votes)	Share of votes	Outcome
2009	3	Jusuf Kalla	Wiranto	15,081,814	12.41%	Lost			
2014	2	Joko Widodo	Jusuf Kalla	70,997,833	53.15%	Elected			
2019	1	Joko Widodo	Ma'ruf Amin	85,607,362	55.50%	Elected			
2024	3	Ganjar Pranowo	Mahfud MD	27,040,878	16.47%	Lost			
