= List of members of the Indonesian House of Representatives (2004–2009) =

This article lists the members of the People's Representative Council from 2004 to 2009. The 16th People's Representative Council follows the 2004 Indonesian legislative election held on 5 April 2004. There are 550 elected MPs in the Parliament.

== Speaker and Deputy Speaker ==
Name	Photo	Position	Party	Notes
Agung Laksono		Speaker	Golkar	
Soetardjo Soerjogoeritno		Deputy Speaker	Indonesian Democratic Party of Struggle	
Muhaimin Iskandar		Deputy Speaker	National Awakening Party	
Zaenal Maarif		Deputy Speaker	Reform Star Party	

== List of members ==
=== Aceh ===
Name	Constituency	Party	Votes	Notes
M. Nasir Jamil	Aceh 1	PKS	63,727	
Marliah Amin	Aceh 1	Golkar	48,000	
Muhammad Yus	Aceh 1	PPP	36,485	
Imam Syuja	Aceh 1	PAN	27,207	
Anhar	Aceh 1	PBR	24,447	
Rusli Ramli	Aceh 1	DEM	15,202	
Muhammad Fauzi	Aceh 1	PBB	14,687	
Ahmad Farhan Hamid, MS	Aceh 2	PAN	27,523	
Muchtar Aziz, MA	Aceh 2	PPP	24,512	
Muhammad Nurlif	Aceh 2	Golkar	23,226	
Zainal Abidin Hussein, SE	Aceh 2	PBR	17,230	
Mirwan Amir	Aceh 2	DEM	17,207	
Andi Salahuddin, SE	Aceh 2	PKS	15,021	

=== North Sumatra ===
Name	Constituency	Party	Votes	Notes
Muhammad Idris Luthfi, MSc	North Sumatra 1	PKS	93,516	
N. Serta Ginting	North Sumatra 1	Golkar	43,428	
Hasrul Azwar, MM	North Sumatra 1	PPP	35,891	
Irmadi Lubis	North Sumatra 1	PDIP	34,499	
Mhd. Yusuf Pardamean, NST	North Sumatra 1	DEM	33,792	
Hasurungan Simamora	North Sumatra 1	PDS	29,813	
Mulfachri Harahap, SH	North Sumatra 1	PAN	27,913	
Antarini Malik	North Sumatra 1	Golkar	24,019	
Zaenal Ma'arif	North Sumatra 1	PBR	22,039	
Yasonna Laoly	North Sumatra 1	PDIP	17,206	
Rambe Kamarulzaman	North Sumatra 2	Golkar	59,804	
Idealisman Dachi	North Sumatra 2	Pelopor	32,655	
Syarfi Hutauruk	North Sumatra 2	Golkar	31,012	
Rufinus Sianturi	North Sumatra 2	PDS	25,834	
Trimedya Panjaitan	North Sumatra 2	PDIP	21,653	
Musa Ichwanshah	North Sumatra 2	PPP	19,467	
Nasaruddin Pasaribu	North Sumatra 2	PBR	15,123	
Saidi Butar Butar	North Sumatra 2	DEM	12,671	
Akmaldin Noor, MBA	North Sumatra 2	PAN	12,243	
Mahadi Sinambela, M.Si	North Sumatra 3	Golkar	44,087	
Idham, SH, MKN	North Sumatra 3	PDIP	27,603	
Jansen Hutasoit, SE, MM	North Sumatra 3	PDS	25,864	
Nasril Bahar, SE	North Sumatra 3	PAN	23,635	
Taufan Tampubolon, SE	North Sumatra 3	PDIP	22,043	
Bomer Pasaribu, SH, SE, MS	North Sumatra 3	Golkar	21,298	
Maiyasyak Johan, SH, MH	North Sumatra 3	PPP	21,154	
Zul Hizwar, S.Psi	North Sumatra 3	PBR	19,990	
Ansory Siregar	North Sumatra 3	PKS	18,415	
Maruahal Silalahi	North Sumatra 3	DEM	15,957	

=== West Sumatra ===
Name	Constituency	Party	Votes	Notes
Azwir Dainy Tara, MBA	West Sumatra 1	Golkar	71,552	
Aulia Aman Rachman, SH, MSi	West Sumatra 1	Golkar	54,312	
Irwan Prayitno	West Sumatra 1	PKS	46,677	
Patrialis Akbar, SH	West Sumatra 1	PAN	43,590	
Dasrul Djabar	West Sumatra 1	DEM	26,140	
Is Anwar	West Sumatra 1	PBR	23,789	
Epyardi Asda	West Sumatra 1	PPP	20,803	
Nur Syamsi Nurlan, SH	West Sumatra 1	PBB	14,696	
Darul Siska	West Sumatra 2	Golkar	31,366	
Ichwan Ishak, Msi	West Sumatra 2	PAN	24,386	
Andiwahab Dt. Majokayo, Sm.Hk	West Sumatra 2	Golkar	20,578	
Refrizal	West Sumatra 2	PKS	18,961	
Yudo Paripurno, SH.	West Sumatra 2	PPP	18,302	
Nizar Dahlan, M.Si	West Sumatra 2	PBB	12,237	

=== Riau ===
Name	Constituency	Party	Votes	Notes
Saleh Djasit, SH	Riau	Golkar	195,348	
Azlaini Agus, SH, MH	Riau	PAN	41,577	
Azwar Chesputra, SE	Riau	Golkar	37,126	
Chairul Anwar, Apt	Riau	PKS	36,441	
Musfihin Dahlan	Riau	Golkar	27,061	
Fachruddin S	Riau	PDIP	26,779	
Syahrial Agamas	Riau	PPP	25,831	
Bulyan Royan	Riau	PBR	23,822	
Mirrian Sjofjan Arief, M.Ec, Phd	Riau	DEM	22,566	
Muhammad Tonas, SE	Riau	PBB	15,611	
Khaidir M.Wafa	Riau	PKB	14,375	

=== Riau Islands ===
Name	Constituency	Party	Votes	Notes
Asman Abnur, SE	Riau Islands	PAN	30,650	
Jaka Aryadipa Singgih	Riau Islands	PDIP	21,399	
Harry Azhar Azis, MA	Riau Islands	Golkar	21,132	

=== Jambi ===
Name	Constituency	Party	Votes	Notes
Rizal Djalil, MM	Jambi	PAN	70,624	
Antony Zedra Abidin	Jambi	Golkar	64,836	
Ismail Tajuddin	Jambi	Golkar	34,249	
Elviana, M.Si	Jambi	PDIP	25,546	
Ami Taher	Jambi	PKS	25,051	
Achmad Farial	Jambi	PPP	20,779	
Syofyan	Jambi	DEM	20,107	

=== South Sumatra ===
Name	Constituency	Party	Votes	Notes
Hakim Sorimuda Pohan, SPog	South Sumatra 1	DEM	57,599	
Ridwan Mukti, MBA	South Sumatra 1	Golkar	55,836	
Nazarudin Kiemas	South Sumatra 1	PDIP	40,723	
Mustafa Kamal, SS	South Sumatra 1	PKS	30,908	
Kahar Muzakir	South Sumatra 1	Golkar	28,865	
Ishartanto, SE, MMA	South Sumatra 1	PKB	15,894	
Djabaruddin Ahmad	South Sumatra 1	PPP	15,783	
Joko Santoso, S.Sos	South Sumatra 1	PAN	12,858	
Marzuki Achmad, SH	South Sumatra 2	Golkar	63,039	
Dudhie Makmun Murod, MBA	South Sumatra 2	PDIP	41,816	
A. Hafiz Zawawi. MSc	South Sumatra 2	Golkar	36,753	
Sarjan Tahir, SE, MM	South Sumatra 2	DEM	28,637	
Romzi Nihan, S.Ip	South Sumatra 2	PPP	28,272	
Bursah Zarnubi, SE	South Sumatra 2	PBR	25,083	
Moh. Darus Agap	South Sumatra 2	PBB	17,295	
Putra Jaya Husin	South Sumatra 2	PAN	16,064	

=== Bangka Belitung ===
Name	Constituency	Party	Votes	Notes
Yusron Ihza, LLM	Bangka Belitung	PBB	63,137	
Azhar Romli, M.Si	Bangka Belitung	Golkar	24,284	
Rudianto Tjen	Bangka Belitung	PDIP	18,604	

=== Bengkulu ===
Name	Constituency	Party	Votes	Notes
Sulaeman Effendi	Bengkulu	Golkar	35,648	
Hermansyah Nazirun, SH	Bengkulu	PAN	16,264	
Al Amin Nur Nasution, SE	Bengkulu	PPP	14,203	
Elva Hartati M. S.Ip	Bengkulu	PDIP	11,454	

=== Lampung ===
Name	Constituency	Party	Votes	Notes
Agusman Effendi	Lampung 1	Golkar	55,371	
Al Muzzammil Yusuf	Lampung 1	PKS	47,935	
Suparlan, SH	Lampung 1	PDIP	34,597	
Zulkifli, SE, MM	Lampung 1	PAN	31,230	
Djoko Purwongemboro	Lampung 1	Golkar	27,784	
Isma Yatun	Lampung 1	PDIP	24,875	
Sundari Fitriyana, S.Ag	Lampung 1	PPP	20,592	
Sutan Bhatoegana, MM	Lampung 1	DEM	17,645	
Riswan Tony DK	Lampung 2	Golkar	58,693	
Azis Syamsuddin	Lampung 2	Golkar	46,261	
Sukowaluyo Mintohardjo	Lampung 2	PDIP	46,127	Moved to the Democratic Renewal Party in 2005.
Abdul Hakim, M.M.	Lampung 2	PKS	43,621	
Pataniari Siahaan	Lampung 2	PDIP	32,438	
Ahmad Syafrin Romas	Lampung 2	PKB	31,891	
Atte Sugandi, MM	Lampung 2	DEM	19,782	
Dion Hardi, BA	Lampung 2	PKPB	12,753	
Nadalia Djohansyah Makki	Lampung 2	PAN	12,493	

=== Jakarta ===
Name	Constituency	Party	Votes	Notes
Anis Matta	Jakarta 1	PKS	98,494	
Irzan Tanjung	Jakarta 1	DEM	90,606	
Hr. Agung Laksono	Jakarta 1	Golkar	69,762	
Tri Yulianto, SH	Jakarta 1	DEM	51,561	
Soekardjo Hardjosoewirdjo, SH	Jakarta 1	PDIP	45,162	
Dradjad Hari Wibowo, MEc	Jakarta 1	PAN	36,949	
Nursanita Nasution, SE, ME	Jakarta 1	PKS	32,916	
Rama Pratama, SE, Ak	Jakarta 1	PKS	30,340	
Suryadharma Ali, M.Si	Jakarta 1	PPP	23,847	
Chufran Hamal, SH	Jakarta 1	DEM	21,248	
Tiurlan Basaria Hutagaol, STh, MA	Jakarta 1	PDS	20,137	
Effendi M.S. Simbolon	Jakarta 1	PDIP	18,939	
Hidayat Nur Wahid	Jakarta 2	PKS	262,019	
Husein Abdul Aziz	Jakarta 2	DEM	92,081	
Fahmi Idris	Jakarta 2	Golkar	45,825	
Indria Octavia Muaja	Jakarta 2	DEM	41,274	
Roy B.B. Janis	Jakarta 2	PDIP	36,505	
Afni Achmad	Jakarta 2	PAN	30,203	
H.A. Chudlory Syafei Hadzami	Jakarta 2	PPP	25,483	
Aan Rohanah, M.Ag	Jakarta 2	PKS	18,114	
Constant M. Ponggawa, SH	Jakarta 2	PDS	17,758	

=== Banten ===
Name	Constituency	Party	Votes	Notes
M. Irsjad Djuwaeli	Banten 1	Golkar	56,422	
Muhammad Aly Yahya	Banten 1	Golkar	41,023	
Mamat Rahayu Abdulah	Banten 1	Golkar	36,374	
Sa'adun Syibromalisi	Banten 1	PPP	24,366	
Arifin Panigoro	Banten 1	PDIP	20,570	
Tumbu Saraswati, SH	Banten 1	PDIP	20,289	
Abdi Sumaithi	Banten 1	PKS	19,398	
Zaenuddin	Banten 1	DEM	17,653	
Tubagus Rizon Sofhani	Banten 1	PAN	14,459	
M. Arsa Suthisna, MM	Banten 1	PKB	10,219	
Hilman Indra, SE. MBA.	Banten 1	PBB	10,196	
Zulkieflimansyah	Banten 2	PKS	92,953	
Budiarsa Sastrawinata	Banten 2	Golkar	63,994	
Denny Sultani Hasa	Banten 2	DEM	44,213	
Ebby Djauharie	Banten 2	Golkar	41,123	
Jazuli Juwaini, Lc	Banten 2	PKS	30,610	
Abdillah Toha	Banten 2	PAN	28,083	
K. Dharmono K. Lawi	Banten 2	PDIP	23,173	
M. Yusuf Faishal, MSc, MBA	Banten 2	PKB	21,564	
Wowo Ibrahim	Banten 2	PDIP	21,428	
Idiel Suryadi, B.Sc	Banten 2	PPP	18,874	
Ade Daud Iswandi	Banten 2	PBR	14,589	

=== West Java ===
Name	Constituency	Party	Votes	Notes
Rahmat Abdullah	West Java 1	PKS	106,882	
Hatta Rajasa	West Java 1	PAN	61,166	
Daday Hudaya	West Java 1	DEM	38,804	
Happy Bone Zulkarnain	West Java 1	Golkar	34,754	
Mangara M Siahaan	West Java 1	PDIP	26,881	
Burhanudin Somawinata	West Java 1	PPP	14,598	
Paskah Suzetta	West Java 2	Golkar	121,949	
Ferry Mursyidan Baldan	West Java 2	Golkar	98,835	
Lili Asdjudiredja	West Java 2	Golkar	89,968	
Marissa Haque	West Java 2	PDIP	65,119	
Mohammad Taufiq Kiemas	West Java 2	PDIP	48,845	
Ma'mur Hasanuddin	West Java 2	PKS	43,311	
Roestanto Wahidi Dirdjojuwono	West Java 2	DEM	31,544	
Dedy Djamaluddin Malik	West Java 2	PAN	29,426	
Ahmad Kurdi Moekri	West Java 2	PPP	26,152	
Malam Sambat Kaban	West Java 2	PBB	16,020	
Dewi Asmara	West Java 3	Golkar	87,568	
Deding Ishak	West Java 3	Golkar	86,762	
Tonny Aprilani	West Java 3	Golkar	69,926	
Lukman Hakiem	West Java 3	PPP	46,242	
Djalaluddin Asysyatibi	West Java 3	PKS	43,386	
Adiwarsita Adinegoro	West Java 3	Golkar	43,314	
Chairul Anwar Lubis	West Java 3	PPP	43,025	
Amris Fuad Hasan	West Java 3	PDIP	36,691	
Ribka Tjiptaning	West Java 3	PDIP	28,490	
Syarifuddin Hasan	West Java 3	DEM	20,646	
Sayuti Asyatry	West Java 3	PAN	10,395	
Mohammad Hatta	West Java 4	Golkar	87,879	
Yusuf Supendi	West Java 4	PKS	77,027	
Untung Wahono	West Java 4	PKS	72,219	
Awal Kusumah	West Java 4	Golkar	67,956	
Endang Kosasih	West Java 4	PPP	53,161	
Airlangga Hartarto	West Java 4	Golkar	44,525	
Noviantika Nasution	West Java 4	PDIP	29,991	
Max Sopacua	West Java 4	DEM	29,827	
Sofyan Usman	West Java 4	PPP	24,988	
Sabri Saiman	West Java 4	PAN	19,802	
Philip S Widjaja	West Java 4	PDIP	15,018	
Yoyoh Yusroh	West Java 5	PKS	139,967	
Tata Zainal Mutaqin	West Java 5	DEM	86,616	
Andi Mappetahang Fatwa	West Java 5	PAN	75,142	
Moh. S. Hidayat	West Java 5	Golkar	55,002	
Zulkarnaen Djabar	West Java 5	Golkar	43,486	
Zainal Arifin	West Java 5	PDIP	38,878	
PANda Nababan	West Java 5	PDIP	37,982	
A. Najiyulloh	West Java 5	PKS	37,259	
Dh. Al Yusni	West Java 5	PKS	31,874	
A. Rahman Syagaff	West Java 5	PPP	29,332	
Carol Daniel Kadang	West Java 5	PDS	18,592	
Boy M.W. Saul	West Java 5	DEM	15,494	
Wasma Prayitno	West Java 6	Golkar	78,513	
Ade Komarudin	West Java 6	Golkar	60,064	
Goenawan Slamet	West Java 6	PDIP	35,524	
Bagus Suryama Majana Sastra	West Java 6	PKS	24,107	
Agus Hermanto	West Java 6	DEM	21,723	
B. Tamam Achda	West Java 6	PPP	13,635	
Muhammad A.S.Hikam, MA	West Java 7	PKB	52,165	
Engartiasto Lukita	West Java 7	Golkar	43,378	
Suryana	West Java 7	PDIP	37,775	
Nurul Qomar	West Java 7	DEM	33,745	
Yosep Umar Hadi	West Java 7	PDIP	31,745	
Yuddy Chrisnandi	West Java 7	Golkar	30,549	
Sidarto Danusubroto	West Java 7	PDIP	29,097	
Mahfudz Siddiq	West Java 7	PKS	27,311	
Ma'mur Noor	West Java 7	PPP	17,129	
Eldie Suwandie	West Java 8	Golkar	107,662	
Budi Harsono	West Java 8	Golkar	52,668	
Djoemad Cipto Wardoyo	West Java 8	PDIP	43,742	
Maruarar Sirait, S.Ip	West Java 8	PDIP	34,552	
Ade Firdaus	West Java 8	PAN	29,972	
Wahyudin Munawir	West Java 8	PKS	26,783	
Anwar Sanusi	West Java 8	PPP	22,243	
A. Helmy Faishal Zaini	West Java 8	PKB	20,594	
Agun Gunandjar Sudarsa	West Java 9	Golkar	102,154	
Eka Santosa	West Java 9	PDIP	42,649	
Umung Anwar Sanusi	West Java 9	PKS	39,918	
Endang Karman	West Java 9	PDIP	31,013	
HA. Chozin Chumaidy	West Java 9	PPP	30,980	
Yusuf Macan Effendi	West Java 9	PAN	28,331	
Maryamah Nugraha Besoes	West Java 9	Golkar	24,133	
Asep Ruchimat Sudjana	West Java 10	Golkar	96,790	
Amin Bunyamin	West Java 10	PPP	67,463	
Hilman Rosyad Syihab	West Java 10	PKS	64,905	
Abdul Nurhaman	West Java 10	Golkar	60,445	
Endin Aj. Soefihara	West Java 10	PPP	45,322	
Mohammad Dachlan Chudori	West Java 10	PKB	44,854	
Ferdiansyah	West Java 10	Golkar	36,526	
E. A. Darojat	West Java 10	PDIP	31,019	
Tristanti Mitayani	West Java 10	PAN	24,357	
Aziddin	West Java 10	DEM	20,585	

=== Central Java ===
Name	Constituency	Party	Votes	Notes
Daniel Budi Setiawan	Central Java 1	PDIP	75,802	
H.Z. Arifin Junaidi	Central Java 1	PKB	51,759	
Vera Febyanthy	Central Java 1	DEM	33,745	
Ahmad Darodji	Central Java 1	Golkar	33,260	
Zuber Safawi	Central Java 1	PKS	30,760	
Ema Wirandrati	Central Java 1	PDIP	25,902	
Alvin Lie Ling Piao	Central Java 1	PAN	20,546	
Akhmad Muqowam	Central Java 1	PPP	17,038	
Arief Mudatsir Mandan	Central Java 2	PPP	32,870	
Mufid A. Busyairi	Central Java 2	PKB	25,862	
Deddy Sutomo	Central Java 2	PDIP	22,349	
Agung Sasongko	Central Java 2	PDIP	16,590	
Nusron Wahid	Central Java 2	Golkar	13,157	
Shidki Wahab	Central Java 2	DEM	8,578	
Faqih Chaeroni	Central Java 2	PPP	7,518	
Badriyah Fayumi	Central Java 3	PKB	46,954	
Bambang Sadono	Central Java 3	Golkar	44,412	
Ahmad Thoyfoer	Central Java 3	PPP	34,133	
Siti Soepami	Central Java 3	PDIP	34,036	
Tjahjo Kumolo	Central Java 3	PDIP	32,598	
Marwan	Central Java 3	PKB	26,804	
Sri Harini	Central Java 3	Golkar	20,622	
Sonny Keraf	Central Java 3	PDIP	20,291	
Ignatius Mulyono	Central Java 3	DEM	18,093	
Sumaryoto	Central Java 4	PDIP	128,504	
Bambang Wuryanto	Central Java 4	PDIP	49,337	
Tjandra Widjaja	Central Java 4	PDIP	33,804	
Hajriyanto Y. Thohari	Central Java 4	Golkar	28,982	
Mufid Rahmat	Central Java 4	PKB	26,920	
Tuti Indarsih Loekman Soetrisno	Central Java 4	PAN	15,255	
F.X. Soekarno	Central Java 4	DEM	13,619	
Marwoto Mitrohardjono	Central Java 5	PAN	76,138	
Gunawan Wirosaroyo	Central Java 5	PDIP	45,109	
Aria Bima	Central Java 5	PDIP	36,141	
Soeharsoyo	Central Java 5	Golkar	34,266	
Mutammimul Ula	Central Java 5	PKS	34,149	
Nusyirwan Soejono	Central Java 5	PDIP	22,605	
Soekartono Hadi Warsito	Central Java 5	DEM	19,561	
Idham Cholied	Central Java 6	PKB	54,413	
Erman Suparno	Central Java 6	PKB	44,329	
Angelina Sondakh	Central Java 6	DEM	43,944	
Marjono	Central Java 6	PDIP	40,643	
Sudigdo A.	Central Java 6	PDIP	37,192	
Tjatur Sapto Edy	Central Java 6	PAN	35,089	
Lukman Hakim Saifuddin	Central Java 6	PPP	29,355	
Bobby Satrio Hardiwibowo Suhardiman	Central Java 6	Golkar	19,069	
Priyo Budi Santoso	Central Java 7	Golkar	61,831	
Raden Saleh Abdul Malik	Central Java 7	PKB	33,594	
Soeratal HW	Central Java 7	PDIP	32,989	
Ganjar Pranowo	Central Java 7	PDIP	32,482	
Taufik Kurniawan	Central Java 7	PAN	24,600	
Daromi Irdjas	Central Java 7	PPP	23,816	
Burhanuddin Bur Maras	Central Java 7	DEM	12,188	
Fuad Bawazier	Central Java 8	PAN	56,772	
Slamet Effendy Yusuf	Central Java 8	Golkar	39,213	
Dito Ganinduto	Central Java 8	Golkar	38,988	
Hendarso Hadiparmono	Central Java 8	PDIP	38,021	
A. Condro Prayitno	Central Java 8	PDIP	30,753	
Nadrah Izahari	Central Java 8	PDIP	28,595	
Suryo Supeno	Central Java 8	DEM	23,710	
Cecep Syarifuddin	Central Java 8	PKB	15,545	
Bachrudin Nasori	Central Java 9	PKB	94,466	
Hanief Ismail	Central Java 9	PKB	31,594	
Munawar Sholeh	Central Java 9	PAN	30,943	
A.H. Mujib Rohmat	Central Java 9	Golkar	28,378	
Pupung Suharis	Central Java 9	PDIP	27,599	
Chepy Triprakoso Wartono	Central Java 9	PDIP	22,707	
Suswono	Central Java 9	PKS	21,433	
Zainut Tauhid Sa'adi	Central Java 9	PPP	14,906	
Alwi Abdurrahman Shihab	Central Java 10	PKB	73,571	
Bisri Romli	Central Java 10	PKB	45,878	
Ramson Siagian	Central Java 10	PDIP	33,131	
Djuhad Mahja	Central Java 10	PPP	24,512	
Widodo Bujo Wiryono	Central Java 10	PDIP	22,635	
Mohammad Ichwan Syam	Central Java 10	Golkar	19,010	
Abdul Hakam Naja	Central Java 10	PAN	17,957	

=== Yogyakarta ===
Name	Constituency	Party	Votes	Notes
A. H. Soetardjo S, BA	Yogyakarta	PDIP	83,520	
Totok Daryanto, SE	Yogyakarta	PAN	80,018	
Latifah Iskandar	Yogyakarta	PAN	76,222	
GBPH. Joyokusumo	Yogyakarta	Golkar	65,980	
Edi Mihati	Yogyakarta	PDIP	37,179	
Zunatul Mafruchah	Yogyakarta	PKB	32,737	
Agus Purnomo	Yogyakarta	PKS	32,193	
Budi Prihandoko	Yogyakarta	DEM	23,253	

=== East Java ===
Name	Constituency	Party	Votes	Notes
Khofifah Indar Parawansa	East Java 1	PKB	153,118	
Sutjipto	East Java 1	PDIP	110,460	
Muhaimin Iskandar	East Java 1	PKB	107,913	
Djoko Susilo	East Java 1	PAN	52,328	
Ario Wijanarko	East Java 1	PKB	43,978	
Marcus Silanno	East Java 1	DEM	36,518	
Murdaya Poo	East Java 1	PDIP	31,613	
Suripto	East Java 1	PKS	27,444	
L. Soepomo	East Java 1	PDIP	23,007	
Joko Subroto	East Java 1	Golkar	19,130	
Ahmad Rawi	East Java 2	PKB	42,253	
Adjie Massaid	East Java 2	DEM	31,641	
Syaifullah Yusuf	East Java 2	PKB	24,448	
Nursyahbani Kacasungkana	East Java 2	PKB	23,515	
Faridah Effendy	East Java 2	Golkar	23,189	
Tosari Widjaja	East Java 2	PPP	17,912	
Soewarno	East Java 2	PDIP	16,784	
Abdulah Azwar Anas	East Java 3	PKB	135,337	
Amin Said Husni	East Java 3	PKB	85,683	
Ahmad Anas Yahya	East Java 3	PKB	44,477	
Hardisoesilo	East Java 3	Golkar	27,241	
Nur Suhud	East Java 3	PDIP	21,912	
Azam Azman Natawijana	East Java 3	DEM	18,555	
Usamah Muhammad Al Hadar	East Java 3	PPP	14,512	
Yusuf Muhammad	East Java 4	PKB	86,534	
Ali Mudhori	East Java 4	PKB	49,777	
Imam Suroso	East Java 4	PDIP	33,413	
Choirul Sholeh Rasyid, SE	East Java 4	PKB	30,168	
Herman Widyananda	East Java 4	Golkar	20,817	
Tukidjo	East Java 4	PDIP	19,572	
Sunarto Muntako	East Java 4	DEM	16,898	
Syumli Syadli, SH.	East Java 4	PPP	9,914	
Anisah Mahfudz	East Java 5	PKB	64,224	
Pramono Anung	East Java 5	PDIP	60,643	
Saifullah Ma'shum	East Java 5	PKB	47,772	
Tyas Indyah Iskandar	East Java 5	Golkar	40,317	
Didiek J Rachbini	East Java 5	PAN	29,010	
Gayus Lumbuun	East Java 5	PDIP	24,066	
Luthfi Hasan Ishaaq	East Java 5	PKS	17,865	
Hasanaudin Said	East Java 5	DEM	17,805	
Guruh Soekarnoputra	East Java 6	PDIP	168,763	
Ali Masykur Musa	East Java 6	PKB	156,194	
Imam Nahrawi	East Java 6	PKB	53,022	
Imam Anshori Saleh	East Java 6	PKB	39,646	
Achmad Fauzie	East Java 6	DEM	34,833	
Irsyad Sudiro	East Java 6	Golkar	30,922	
W. Eko Waluyo	East Java 6	PDIP	26,669	
Achmad Affandi	East Java 6	PAN	15,761	
Theodorus J.K	East Java 6	PDIP	15,237	
Markum Singodimejo	East Java 7	Golkar	75,611	
Subki Risya	East Java 7	PKB	41,862	
Heri Achmadi	East Java 7	PDIP	38,923	
Yahya Zaini	East Java 7	Golkar	31,279	
Soetadji	East Java 7	DEM	30,248	
Hasto Kristiyanto	East Java 7	PDIP	29,850	
Mardiana Indraswati	East Java 7	PAN	29,338	
Mahsusoh Ujiati	East Java 7	PPP	9,787	
Ida Fauziyah	East Java 8	PKB	69,086	
Hasyim Karim	East Java 8	PKB	48,473	
Moch. Hasib Wahab	East Java 8	PDIP	45,879	
Guntur Sasono	East Java 8	DEM	39,456	
Suwignyo	East Java 8	PDIP	35,139	
Muhyidin Arubusman	East Java 8	PKB	30,422	
Mindo Sianipar	East Java 8	PDIP	24,253	
Hayani Isman	East Java 8	Golkar	24,174	
Soedarmani Wiryatmo	East Java 8	Golkar	23,424	
Hafidz Ma'soem	East Java 8	PPP	19,149	
Effendy Choirie	East Java 9	PKB	108,102	
Taufikurrachman Saleh	East Java 9	PKB	105,981	
Anna Mu'awanah, SE	East Java 9	PKB	79,355	
Muhammad Najib	East Java 9	PAN	54,704	
Masduki Baidlowi	East Java 9	PKB	45,603	
Permadi, SH	East Java 9	PDIP	39,795	
Aisyah Hamid Baidlowi	East Java 9	Golkar	37,956	
E.C.H. Soekotjo Said	East Java 9	Golkar	24,929	
Ida Bagus N	East Java 9	PDIP	18,507	
Machfudhoh Aly Ubaid	East Java 9	PPP	15,522	
Balkan Kaplale	East Java 9	DEM	12,211	
Imam Buchori Cholil	East Java 10	PKB	95,913	
Ilyas Sira	East Java 10	PKB	87,365	
Mahfud MD	East Java 10	PKB	75,418	
Ismail Muzakki	East Java 10	PPP	23,499	
Sulaeman Fadeli	East Java 10	PPP	17,332	
Imam Supardi	East Java 10	Golkar	16,150	
Said Abdullah	East Java 10	PDIP	9,776	
Djoko Edhi Soetjipto Abdurrahman	East Java 10	PAN	8,539	

=== West Kalimantan ===
Name	Constituency	Party	Votes	Notes
Akil Mokhtar	West Kalimantan	Golkar	102,340	
Gusti Syamsumin	West Kalimantan	Golkar	60,493	
Agustinus Clarus	West Kalimantan	PDIP	40,831	
Uray Faisal Hamid, SH	West Kalimantan	PPP	38,237	
Max Moein	West Kalimantan	PDIP	36,627	
Asiah Salekan	West Kalimantan	Golkar	30,674	
Ishaq Saleh	West Kalimantan	PAN	24,077	
Albert Yaputra	West Kalimantan	DEM	23,981	
Walman Siahaan	West Kalimantan	PDS	21,378	
Rusman H.M. Ali	West Kalimantan	PBR	20,428	

=== Central Kalimantan ===
Name	Constituency	Party	Votes	Notes
Agustin Teras Narang	Central Kalimantan	PDIP	63,298	
Chairunnissa	Central Kalimantan	Golkar	39,441	
Mochtaruddin	Central Kalimantan	Golkar	19,387	
Rusnain Yahya	Central Kalimantan	PPP	15,830	
Nurul Falah Eddy Pariang	Central Kalimantan	PAN	12,643	
Barnstein Samuel Tundan	Central Kalimantan	DEM	12,434	

=== East Kalimantan ===
Name	Constituency	Party	Votes	Notes
Afifuddin Thaib	East Kalimantan	Golkar	52,752	
Ahmad Chudori	East Kalimantan	PKS	40,167	
Muhayan Hasan	East Kalimantan	Golkar	31,837	
Adji Farida Padmo	East Kalimantan	DEM	25,208	
Mohammad Yasin Kara	East Kalimantan	PAN	23,142	
Hifni Sarkawie	East Kalimantan	PPP	22,024	
Izedrik Emir Moeis	East Kalimantan	PDIP	21,985	

=== South Kalimantan ===
Name	Constituency	Party	Votes	Notes
Aboe Bakar	South Kalimantan	PKS	52,473	
Hasanuddin Murad	South Kalimantan	Golkar	40,399	
Gusti Iskandar Sukma Alamsyah	South Kalimantan	Golkar	40,389	
Syafriansyah	South Kalimantan	PPP	33,067	
Yusuf Fanie Andin Kasim	South Kalimantan	PBR	22,857	
Husairi Abdi	South Kalimantan	PPP	21,806	
Taufiq Effendi	South Kalimantan	DEM	19,105	
Jumanhuri	South Kalimantan	PAN	15,950	
Misbah Hidayat	South Kalimantan	PKB	14,660	
Royani Haminullah	South Kalimantan	PDIP	14,043	
Jamaluddin Karim	South Kalimantan	PBB	10,866	

=== South Sulawesi ===
Name	Constituency	Party	Votes	Notes
Andi Mattalatta	South Sulawesi 1	Golkar	94,611	
Tamsil Linrung	South Sulawesi 1	PKS	54,490	
Anwar Arifin	South Sulawesi 1	Golkar	53,470	
Nurhayati Yasin Limpo	South Sulawesi 1	Golkar	49,352	
Ryaas Rasyid	South Sulawesi 1	PDK	45,775	
Andi M. Ghalib	South Sulawesi 1	PPP	43,240	
Hamka Yandhu Y.R	South Sulawesi 1	Golkar	42,508	
Idrus Marham	South Sulawesi 1	Golkar	33,759	
Abdul Hadi Jamal	South Sulawesi 1	PAN	26,879	
Junus Effendi Habibie	South Sulawesi 1	DEM	24,218	
Anwar Fatta	South Sulawesi 1	PDIP	17,611	
Andi Djalal Bachtiar	South Sulawesi 1	PBR	8,150	
Syamsul Bachri	South Sulawesi 2	Golkar	97,025	
Marwah Daud Ibrahim	South Sulawesi 2	Golkar	86,815	
Fachri Andi Leluasa	South Sulawesi 2	Golkar	60,209	
Mariani Akib Baramuli	South Sulawesi 2	Golkar	59,362	
Malkan Amin	South Sulawesi 2	Golkar	53,304	
Jacobus Mayong Padang	South Sulawesi 2	PDIP	35,498	
Seniman Latif	South Sulawesi 2	PKS	29,712	
Andi Yuliani Paris	South Sulawesi 2	PAN	25,827	
Yunus Yosfiah	South Sulawesi 2	PPP	20,880	
Ali Mochtar Ngabalin	South Sulawesi 2	PBB	13,878	
Rapiuddin Hamarung	South Sulawesi 2	PDK	13,797	
Diah Defawati	South Sulawesi 2	PBR	12,450	

=== Central Sulawesi ===
Name	Constituency	Party	Votes	Notes
Rustam E. Tamburaka	Central Sulawesi	Golkar	49,688	
Mustika Rahim	Central Sulawesi	Golkar	40,611	
Habil Marati	Central Sulawesi	PPP	35,911	
Razak Porosi	Central Sulawesi	PDIP	17,263	
Arbab Papoeka	Central Sulawesi	PAN	17,166	

=== Gorontalo ===
Name	Constituency	Party	Votes	Notes
Zainudin Amali	Gorontalo	Golkar	83,984	
Truliyanti S. Habibie	Gorontalo	Golkar	29,100	
Suharso Monoarfa	Gorontalo	PPP	25,604	

=== North Sulawesi ===
Name	Constituency	Party	Votes	Notes
Theo L. Sambuaga	North Sulawesi	Golkar	130,797	
Evert Erenst Mangindaan	North Sulawesi	DEM	117,502	
Djelantik Mokodompit	North Sulawesi	Golkar	103,443	
Jeffrey Johanes Massie	North Sulawesi	PDS	97,913	
Olly Dondokambey	North Sulawesi	PDIP	52,077	
Sukardi Harun	North Sulawesi	PPP	17,258	

=== Southeast Sulawesi ===
Name	Constituency	Party	Votes	Notes
Sofhian Mile	Southeast Sulawesi	Golkar	106,935	
Muhidin M. Said	Southeast Sulawesi	Golkar	65,485	
Retna Rosmanita Situmorang	Southeast Sulawesi	PDS	31,726	
Rendy Lamadjido	Southeast Sulawesi	PDIP	21,571	
Yusuf Rizal Tjokroaminoto	Southeast Sulawesi	PPP	16,900	
Nurhadi M Musawir	Southeast Sulawesi	PAN	8,994	

=== North Maluku ===
Name	Constituency	Party	Votes	Notes
Abdul Gafur Tengku Idris	North Maluku	Golkar	37,752	
Abdul Gani Kasuba	North Maluku	PKS	27,786	
Mudaffar Syah	North Maluku	PDK	24,692	

=== Maluku ===
Name	Constituency	Party	Votes	Notes
Alexander Litaay	Maluku	PDIP	98,685	
Hamzah Sangadji	Maluku	Golkar	29,301	
Abdul Aziz Arbi	Maluku	PKS	19,884	
John M. Toisuta	Maluku	PDS	13,604	

=== Bali ===
Name	Constituency	Party	Votes	Notes
I Made Urip	Bali	PDIP	146,523	
I Gusti Ngurah Sara	Bali	PDIP	87,350	
Ni Gusti Ayu Eka Sukma Dewi	Bali	PDIP	71,790	
I Gusti Agung Rai Wirajaya	Bali	PDIP	61,700	
Gde Sumarjaya Linggih	Bali	Golkar	51,449	
Wayan Koster	Bali	PDIP	37,947	
Tisnawati Karna	Bali	Golkar	25,455	
I Wayan Gunastra	Bali	DEM	20,350	
Made Suwendha	Bali	PKPB	15,385	

=== West Nusa Tenggara ===
Name	Constituency	Party	Votes	Notes
Muhammad Zainul Majdi	West Nusa Tenggara	PBB	67,296	
Marzuki Darusman	West Nusa Tenggara	Golkar	47,972	
Mesir Suryadi	West Nusa Tenggara	Golkar	42,655	
Nazamuddin	West Nusa Tenggara	PAN	35,105	
Fahri Hamzah	West Nusa Tenggara	PKS	27,342	
Muhammad Anwar	West Nusa Tenggara	PPP	25,857	
Adi Putra Darmawan Tahir	West Nusa Tenggara	Golkar	23,316	
L. Gede Syamsul Mujahidin	West Nusa Tenggara	PBR	21,458	
I Wayan Sugiana	West Nusa Tenggara	DEM	11,922	
Mudahir	West Nusa Tenggara	PDIP	11,606	

=== East Nusa Tenggara ===
Name	Constituency	Party	Votes	Notes
Melchias Markus Mekeng	East Nusa Tenggara 1	Golkar	52,434	
Cyprianus Aoer	East Nusa Tenggara 1	PDIP	38,664	
Josef A. Nae Soi	East Nusa Tenggara 1	Golkar	38,580	
Joseph Williem Lea Wea	East Nusa Tenggara 1	PDI	27,021	
Anton A. Mashur	East Nusa Tenggara 1	Pelopor	15,231	
Harman Benediktus Kabur	East Nusa Tenggara 1	PKPI	11,106	
Setya Novanto	East Nusa Tenggara 2	Golkar	75,319	
Victor Bungtilu Laiskodat	East Nusa Tenggara 2	Golkar	72,249	
Charles J. Mesang	East Nusa Tenggara 2	Golkar	36,440	
Theo Syafei	East Nusa Tenggara 2	PDIP	20,652	
Ruth Nina M. Kedang	East Nusa Tenggara 2	PDS	17,188	
Herman Hery	East Nusa Tenggara 2	PDIP	12,340	
Anita Yacob A Gah	East Nusa Tenggara 2	DEM	10,210	

=== West Papua ===
Name	Constituency	Party	Votes	Notes
Robert Joppy Kardinal	West Papua	Golkar	28,486	
Pastor Saut M. Hasibuan	West Papua	PDS	12,345	
Raja. K. Sembiring	West Papua	PDIP	9,314	

=== Papua ===
Name	Constituency	Party	Votes	Notes
Yorris T.H. Raweyai	West Papua	Golkar	26,199	
Simon Patrice Morin	West Papua	Golkar	21,502	
Etha Bulo	West Papua	Pelop	21,412	
Ben Vincent Djeharu	West Papua	PDIP	15,253	
Apri Hananto Sukandar	West Papua	PDS	10,422	
Tony Wardoyo	West Papua	PKB	6,371	
Drh. Jhony Allen Marbun	West Papua	DEM	5,096	
Sudjud Siradjuddin	West Papua	PAN	3,404	
Inya Bay	West Papua	PDK	3,398	
Ardy Muhammad	West Papua	PNIM	2,371	
