= Pioneers' Party =

Political party in Indonesia

Pioneers's Party Partai Pelopor
- Abbreviation: Pelopor
- Chairman: Eko Suryo Santjojo
- Secretary-General: Ristiyanto
- Founders: Rachmawati Sukarnoputri
- Founded: 29 January 2002; 24 years ago
- Dissolved: 1 June 2011; 15 years ago
- Split from: Indonesian Democratic Party of Struggle
- Merged into: National Unity Party
- Ideology: Pancasila; Marhaenism
- Political position: Centre to centre-left
- DPR (2009): 0 / 560

Website
- Official website

The Pioneers' Party (Indonesian: Partai Pelopor) was a political party in Indonesia. It was founded in 2002 and was initially led by Rachmawati Sukarnoputri, a daughter of Indonesia's first president, Sukarno, and sister of former Indonesian president Megawati Sukarnoputri. It contested the 2009 election, but received only 0.3 percent of the vote, well below the threshold of 2.5% of the political votes, and was awarded no seats in the People's Representative Council. Following its poor result in the 2009 election, the party joined nine other smaller parties to form the National Unity Party (Indonesian: Partai Persatuan Nasional).

== Election results ==
=== Legislative election results ===
Election	Ballot number	Leader	Seats		Total votes	Share of votes	Outcome of election
Election	Ballot number	Leader	No.	±	Total votes	Share of votes	Outcome of election
2004	22	Rachmawati Sukarnoputri	3 / 550		878,932	0.77%	Opposition
2009	24	Eko Suryo Santjojo	0 / 560	▼3	345,092	0.33%	Governing coalition

=== Presidential election results ===
Election	Ballot number	Candidate	Running mate	1st round (Total votes)	Share of votes	Outcome	2nd round (Total votes)	Share of votes	Outcome
2004	3	Amien Rais	Siswono Yudo Husodo	17,392,931	14.66%	Eliminated	Runoff		
2009	2	Susilo Bambang Yudhoyono	Boediono	73,874,562	60.80%	Elected			
