= Indonesian Unity Party =

Indonesian Unity Party Partai Sarikat Indonesia
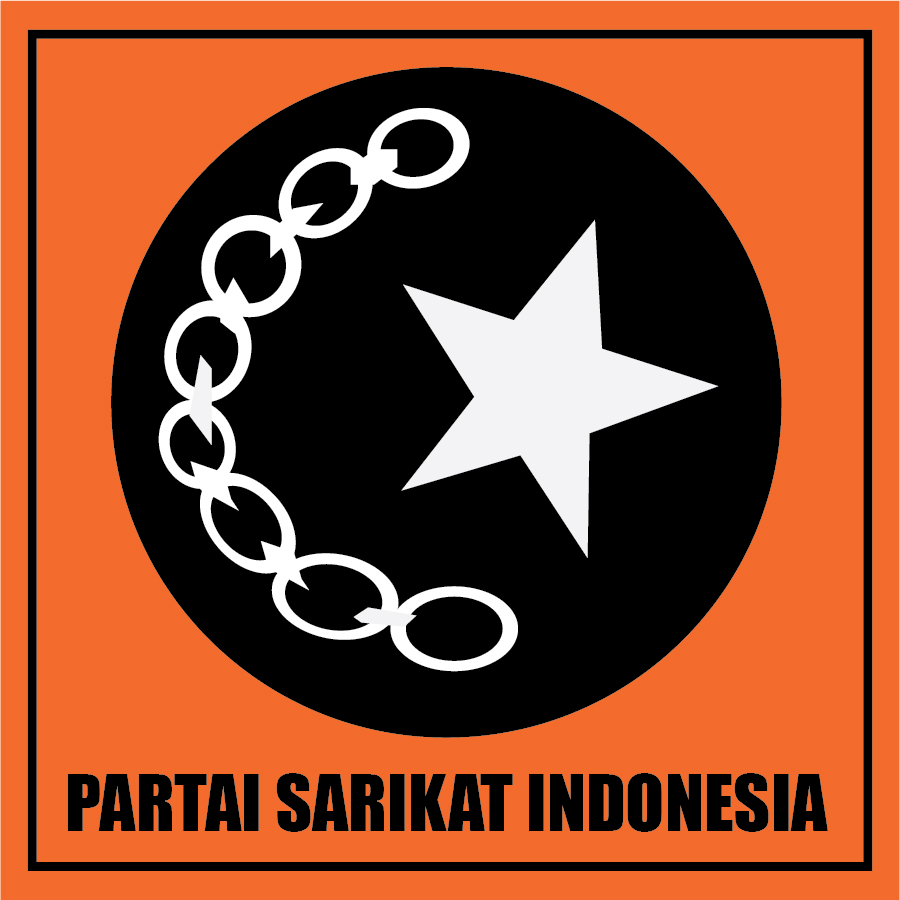
- Leader: Rahardjo Tjakraningrat
- Secretary-General: Nazir Muchamad
- Founded: 17 December 2002 (first incarnation); 2008 (second incarnation)
- Dissolved: 6 April 2005 (first incarnation); 5 June 2012 (second incarnation)
- Merged into: National Mandate Party
- Succeeded by: National Republican Party
- Headquarters: Jl. Kemang Timur Raya No. 55 South Jakarta 12730
- Ideology: Pancasila; Populism
- Political position: Big tent

The Indonesian Unity Party (Indonesian: Partai Sarikat Indonesia, lit. 'Indonesian Union Party') was a political party in Indonesia.

It had its origins in an August 2002 meeting of 15 political parties that had failed to reach the electoral threshold in the 1999 legislative election to qualify for the subsequent election. The idea was that the parties would band together to establish a new party. However, this proved impossible because of differences such as religion and ideologies. Three parties soon dropped out, then another two but driven by the desire to take part in the next election, the remaining ten formed an alliance. By the time the Bogor Political Memorandum was signed on 24 November 2002 only eight parties remained. The following month, the new party was founded.

In the 2004 legislative election, the Indonesian Unity Party won 0.6% of the popular vote and no seats. After initially failing to qualify, following a lawsuit, the party won the right to contest the 2009 elections, in which it won only 0.14 percent of the vote and no seats. In April 2005, the party officially merged into the National Mandate Party (PAN).

== Election results ==
=== Presidential election results ===
Election	Ballot number	Candidate	Running mate	1st round (Total votes)	Share of votes	Outcome	2nd round (Total votes)	Share of votes	Outcome
2004	3	Amien Rais	Siswono Yudo Husodo	17,392,931	14.66%	Eliminated	Lost		
2009	1	Megawati Sukarnoputri	Prabowo Subianto	32,548,105	26.79%	Lost			

=== Legislative election results ===
Election	Ballot number	Leader	Seats		Votes		Status
Election	Ballot number	Leader	No.	±	Total	%	Status
2004	22	Rahardjo Tjakraningrat	0 / 550		679,296	0.60%	Opposition
2009	43	Mardinsyah	0 / 560	0	141,558	0.14%	Opposition
