= Indonesian National Populist Fortress Party =

Indonesian National Populist Fortress Party Partai Nasional Benteng Kerakyatan Indonesia
- Chairman: Eros Djarot
- Secretary-General: Zulfan Lindan
- Founded: 27 July 2002
- Dissolved: 1 June 2011
- Split from: Indonesian Democratic Party of Struggle
- Succeeded by: National Unity Party
- Headquarters: Jakarta
- Ideology: Marhaenism; Indonesian nationalism Left-wing populism
- Political position: Left-wing

The Indonesian National Populist Fortress Party (Indonesian: Partai Nasional Benteng Kerakyatan Indonesia, PNBK) was a political party in Indonesia. The founder, Eros Djarot was dissatisfied with the Indonesian Democratic Party of Struggle (PDI-P), which refused to allow him to stand as chairman against Megawati Sukarnoputri at the party conference in 2000. Eros then formed the Bung Karno National Party, named after Indonesia's first president Sukarno. As the law did not allow the use of national figures in party names, this was changed to the Freedom Bull National Party (with the same initials – PNBK – in Indonesian).

It is an Indonesian political party rooted in the ideas of the first Indonesian President, Sukarno. This party specifically adheres to Marhaenism, an ideology of socialist which is adapted from the concepts of Marxist and adapted. This party was officially declared on 27 July 2002,

In the 2004 legislative elections in the party won 1.1% of the popular vote and 1 out of 550 seats in the People's Representative Council. In the 2009 elections, the party stood as the Indonesian National Populist Fortress Party. It won 0.45 percent of the vote, less than the 2.5 percent electoral threshold, and lost its only seat in the People's Representative Council. Following its poor result in the 2009 vote, the party joined nine other smaller parties to form the National Unity Party (Indonesian: Partai Persatuan Nasional).

== 2004 general election ==
In the 2004 General Election, PNBK participated with number 8, managed to win 1,216,902 votes, or around 1.07% of the total votes, but did not manage to get a single seat in the House of Representatives (DPR).

== 2009 general election ==
Participating with candidate number 26, PNBK Indonesia performed poorly compared to the previous election, only managing to win 468,696 votes, or about 0.45% of the total vote, and once again failed to win a single seat in the House of Representatives.

== Election results ==
=== Presidential election results ===
Election	Ballot number	Candidate	Running mate	1st round (Total votes)	Share of votes	Outcome	2nd round (Total votes)	Share of votes	Outcome
2004	3	Amien Rais	Siswono Yudo Husodo	17,392,931	14.66%	Eliminated	Lost		
2009	2	Susilo Bambang Yudhoyono	Boediono	73,874,562	53.15%	Elected			

=== Legislative election results ===
Election	Ballot number	Leader	Seats		Votes		Status
Election	Ballot number	Leader	No.	±	Total	%	Status
2004	8	Eros Djarot	0 / 550		1,230,455	1.08%	Opposition
2009	26	Eros Djarot	0 / 560	0	468,856	0.45%	Governing coalition
