= 2004 Indonesian legislative election =

- 5 April 2004

All 550 seats in the House of Representatives 276 seats needed for a majority
- Registered: 148,000,369
- Turnout: 84.07%
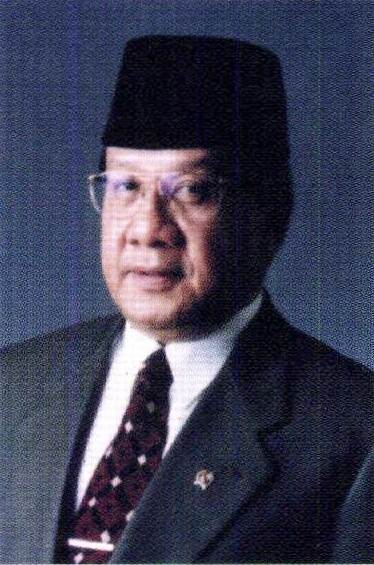

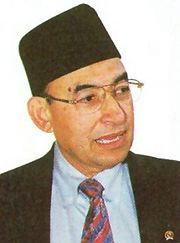

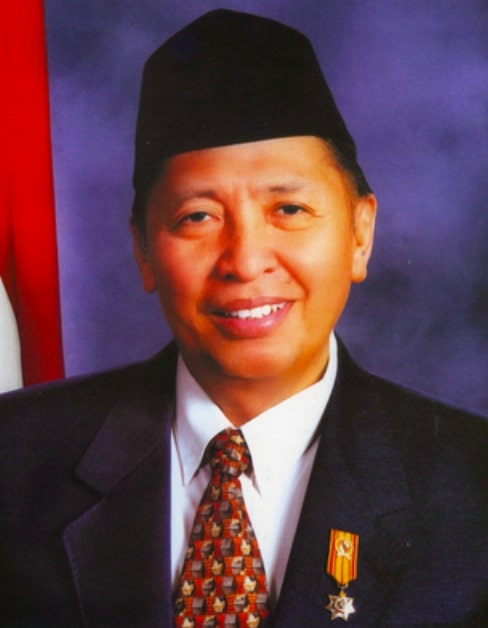

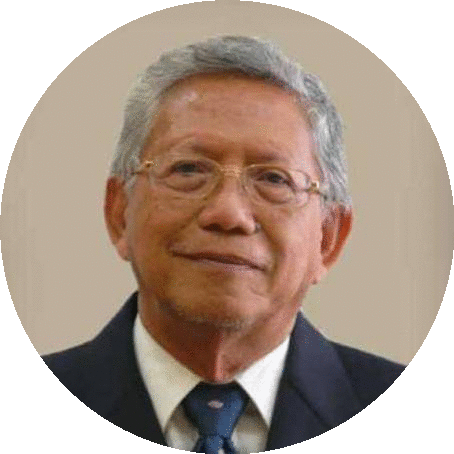

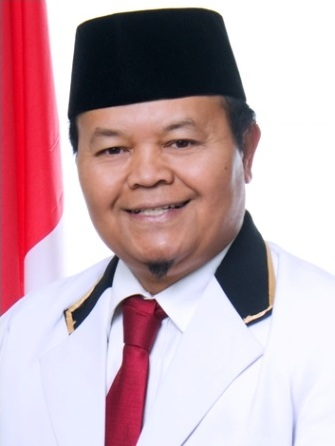

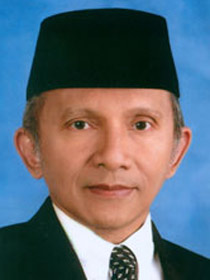

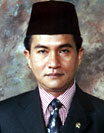

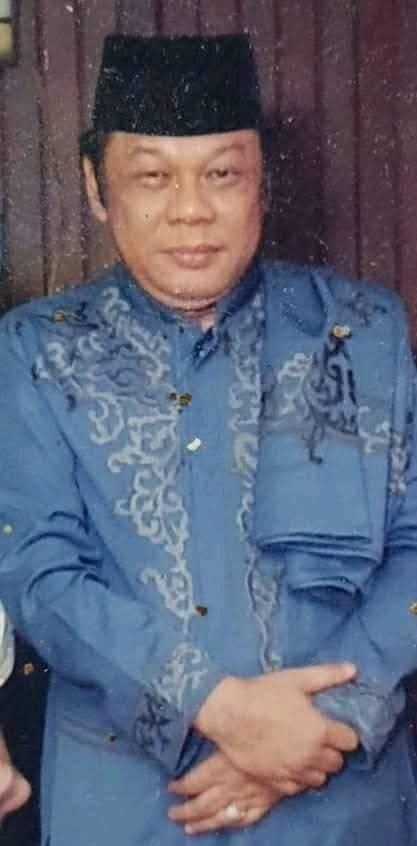
	First party	Second party	Third party
Leader	Akbar Tandjung	Megawati Sukarnoputri	Alwi Shihab
Party	Golkar	PDI-P	PKB
Last election	120 seats, 22.44%	153 seats, 33.74%	51 seats, 12.61%
Seats won	128	109	52
Seat change	▲8	▼44	▲1
Popular vote	24,480,757	21,026,629	11,989,564
Percentage	21.58%	18.53%	10.57%
Swing	▼4.39%	▼15.21%	▼0.46%
	Fourth party	Fifth party	Sixth party
Leader	Hamzah Haz	Subur Budhisantoso	Hidayat Nur Wahid
Party	PPP	Demokrat	PKS
Last election	58 seats, 10.71%	Did not contest	7 seats, 1.36%
Seats won	58	55	45
Seat change	0	New party	▲38
Popular vote	9,248,764	8,455,225	8,325,020
Percentage	8.15%	7.45%	7.34%
Swing	▼2.56%	New party	▲5.96%
	Seventh party	Eighth party	Ninth party
Leader	Amien Rais	Yusril Ihza Mahendra	Bursah Zarnubi
Party	PAN	PBB	PBR
Last election	34 seats, 7.12%	13 seats, 1.94%	Did not contest
Seats won	53	11	14
Seat change	▲19	▼2	New party
Popular vote	7,303,324	2,970,487	2,764,998
Percentage	6.44%	2.62%	2.44%
Swing	▼0.68%	▲0.68%	New party
- Results by electoral district
Speaker before election
Akbar Tandjung
Golkar
Elected Speaker
Agung Laksono
Golkar

Legislative elections were held in on 5 April 2004 for both houses of the People's Consultative Assembly of Indonesia. This included all 550 seats in the People's Representative Council and 128 seats of the newly formed Regional Representative Council.

Final results of the popular vote tally showed that Golkar, the former ruling party of the New Order era, received the most votes. It had lost to the Indonesian Democratic Party of Struggle in the 1999 legislative election. The Democratic Party and the Prosperous Justice Party, two of the newest parties to participate in the elections, received a combined 15% of the popular vote.

Based on the final allocation of seats in the People's Representative Council, Golkar, the Indonesian Democratic Party of Struggle, the National Awakening Party, the United Development Party, the Democratic Party, the Prosperous Justice Party, and the National Mandate Party were qualified to submit candidates for the country's first direct presidential election later in the year.

The election has been described as the most complicated election in the history of democracy.

== Background ==
Logo of the election

Mascot of the election

During its 2002 annual session, the People's Consultative Assembly (MPR) added 14 amendments to the Constitution of Indonesia. Included in these amendments were measures to reorganise the legislature. Beginning in 2004, the MPR was composed of the existing People's Representative Council (DPR) and a new Regional Representative Council (DPD). Because all the seats in the MPR were directly elected, this called for the removal of the military from the legislature, whose 38 seats in the Assembly were appointed. This change and an amendment for direct election of the President and Vice President were significant steps for Indonesia on the road towards full democracy.

On 13 July 2003, President Megawati Sukarnoputri signed into effect a law outlining the composition of the reorganised MPR. The new DPD was composed of four representatives from each of the 32 provinces of Indonesia, not totalling more than one-third of the members of the DPR. The revised constitution also set membership in the DPR at 550.

== Electoral campaign ==
During the first phases of registration, 150 parties were registered with the Ministry of Justice and Human Rights. However, this number was reduced to 50 and then 24 after scrutiny from the newly created General Election Commission. This reduction from the 48 parties that stood in the 1999 legislative election was attributed mainly to a new election law that allowed only parties that had won 2% of seats in the DPR, or 3% of seats in provincial and municipal legislatures in half of the provinces to stand in the 2004 election. Only six parties met this requirement, and the remaining parties were required to merge or reorganise into a new party.

The campaign period for parties and candidates began on 11 March and continued until 1 April. It was split into two phases by Nyepi, the Balinese day of silence. Parties delivered their national agendas indoors between 11 and 25 March. Although this was meant to encourage dialogue between parties and their constituents, these events were poorly attended. The International Foundation for Electoral Systems conducted a tracking survey that showed not all voters knew how to vote for candidates of the new DPD, or were even aware it existed.

Schedule of the 2004 legislative election
11 March–1 April	Active campaigning by parties for the People's Representative Council and by candidates for the Regional Representative Council
2–4 April	Quiet time
5 April	Election day (national holiday)
21–30 April	Announcement of results followed by allocation of seats

Up to 475,000 candidates were nominated by the political parties in the national, provincial, and regental levels. More than 1,200 candidates stood for 128 seats in the DPD, and 7,756 candidates stood for 550 seats in the DPR. Candidates were elected in an open list system.

=== Conduct ===
Election day, 5 April, was relatively free of major incidents and irregularities. Minor violations included officials helping elderly voters cast and submit ballots. Two Indonesian election officials were also reported killed when delivering voting equipment in Papua. The Australian Parliamentary Observer Delegation and the European Union Election Observer Mission were among the organisations observing the election.

== Results ==
The election results determined which political parties were eligible to submit candidates for Indonesia's first direct presidential election, which was held on 5 July. Only parties that received 5% of the popular vote or 3% of seats in the People's Representative Council could submit candidates. Parties that did not meet these criteria had to join with other parties to meet at least one criterion.

The counting of votes took one month, and the final results were announced on 5 May, one week later than was initially scheduled. Of 148,000,369 registered voters, 124,420,339 ballots (84%) were submitted. Of these ballots, 113,462,414 were considered valid, and 10,957,925 were declared invalid. In the People's Representative Council, Golkar received the most number of seats. It had previously lost to the Indonesian Democratic Party of Struggle in the 1999 legislative election after being in power since 1970. However, fourteen of the twenty-four participating parties refused to certify the election results after allegations of irregular vote counting.

Party	Votes	%	Seats	+/–
Golkar	24,480,757	21.58	128	+8
Indonesian Democratic Party of Struggle	21,026,629	18.53	109	−44
National Awakening Party	11,989,564	10.57	52	+1
United Development Party	9,248,764	8.15	58	0
Democratic Party	8,455,225	7.45	55	New
Prosperous Justice Party	8,325,020	7.34	45	+38
National Mandate Party	7,303,324	6.44	53	+19
Crescent Star Party	2,970,487	2.62	11	−2
Reform Star Party	2,764,998	2.44	14	New
Prosperous Peace Party	2,414,254	2.13	13	New
Concern for the Nation Functional Party	2,399,290	2.11	2	New
Indonesian Justice and Unity Party	1,424,240	1.26	1	−3
United Democratic Nationhood Party	1,313,654	1.16	4	New
Freedom Bull National Party	1,230,455	1.08	0	New
Pancasila Patriots' Party	1,073,139	0.95	0	New
Indonesian National Party Marhaenism	923,159	0.81	1	+1
Indonesian Nahdlatul Community Party	895,610	0.79	0	−5
Pioneers' Party	878,932	0.77	3	New
Indonesian Democratic Vanguard Party	855,811	0.75	1	−1
Freedom Party	842,541	0.74	0	New
Indonesian Unity Party	679,296	0.60	0	New
New Indonesia Alliance Party	672,952	0.59	0	New
Regional Unity Party	657,916	0.58	0	New
Social Democrat Labor Party	636,397	0.56	0	0
Total	113,462,414	100.00	550	+50
Valid votes	113,462,414	91.19		
Invalid/blank votes	10,957,925	8.81		
Total votes	124,420,339	100.00		
Registered voters/turnout	148,000,369	84.07		
Source: KPU

=== By province ===
Province	Total seats	Seats won															
Province	Total seats	Golkar	PDI-P	PPP	Demokrat	PAN	PKB	PKS	PBR	PDS	PBB	PPDK	PP	PKPB	PKPI	PPDI	PNI
Aceh	13	2	0	2	2	2	0	2	2	0	1	0	0	0	0	0	0
North Sumatra	29	6	5	3	3	3	0	2	3	3	0	0	1	0	0	0	0
West Sumatra	14	4	0	2	1	2	0	2	1	0	2	0	0	0	0	0	0
Riau	11	3	1	1	1	1	1	1	1	0	1	0	0	0	0	0	0
Jambi	7	2	1	1	1	1	0	1	0	0	0	0	0	0	0	0	0
South Sumatra	16	4	2	2	2	2	1	1	1	0	1	0	0	0	0	0	0
Bengkulu	4	1	1	1	0	1	0	0	0	0	0	0	0	0	0	0	0
Lampung	17	4	4	1	2	2	1	2	0	0	0	0	0	1	0	0	0
Bangka Belitung	3	1	1	0	0	0	0	0	0	0	1	0	0	0	0	0	0
Riau Islands	3	1	1	0	0	1	0	0	0	0	0	0	0	0	0	0	0
Jakarta	21	2	3	2	5	2	0	5	0	2	0	0	0	0	0	0	0
West Java	90	24	18	13	9	8	3	13	0	1	1	0	0	0	0	0	0
Central Java	76	12	24	8	8	8	13	3	0	0	0	0	0	0	0	0	0
Yogyakarta	8	1	2	0	1	2	1	1	0	0	0	0	0	0	0	0	0
East Java	86	13	20	8	9	6	28	2	0	0	0	0	0	0	0	0	0
Banten	22	5	4	2	2	2	2	3	1	0	1	0	0	0	0	0	0
Bali	9	2	5	0	1	0	0	0	0	0	0	0	0	1	0	0	0
West Nusa Tenggara	10	3	1	1	1	1	0	1	1	0	1	0	0	0	0	0	0
East Nusa Tenggara	13	5	3	0	1	0	0	0	0	1	0	0	1	0	1	1	0
West Kalimantan	10	3	2	1	1	1	0	0	1	1	0	0	0	0	0	0	0
Central Kalimantan	6	2	1	1	1	1	0	0	0	0	0	0	0	0	0	0	0
South Kalimantan	11	2	1	2	1	1	1	1	1	0	1	0	0	0	0	0	0
East Kalimantan	7	2	1	1	1	1	0	1	0	0	0	0	0	0	0	0	0
North Sulawesi	6	2	1	1	1	0	0	0	0	1	0	0	0	0	0	0	0
Central Sulawesi	6	2	1	1	0	1	0	0	0	1	0	0	0	0	0	0	0
South Sulawesi	24	10	2	2	1	2	0	2	2	0	1	2	0	0	0	0	0
Southeast Sulawesi	5	2	1	1	0	1	0	0	0	0	0	0	0	0	0	0	0
Gorontalo	3	2	0	1	0	0	0	0	0	0	0	0	0	0	0	0	0
Maluku	4	1	1	0	0	0	0	1	0	1	0	0	0	0	0	0	0
North Maluku	3	1	0	0	0	0	0	1	0	0	0	1	0	0	0	0	0
West Irian Jaya	3	1	1	0	0	0	0	0	0	1	0	0	0	0	0	0	0
Papua	10	3	1	0	0	1	1	0	0	1	0	1	1	0	0	0	1
Total	550	128	109	58	55	53	52	45	14	13	11	4	3	2	1	1	1
Source: Ananta, Arifin & Suryadinata

=== Seat allocation ===
To achieve proportional representation, seat allocation was conducted using the largest remainder method, whereby the Hare quota was used to determine seats automatically secured by individual parties. Any remaining seats assigned to the electoral region were allocated to remaining political parties based on the rank order of their remaining votes.

Seating redistribution in the People's Representative Council
Province	Seat Gain		Seat Loss	
West Kalimantan	Reform Star Party (PBR)	+1	Freedom Bull National Party (PNBK)	−1
Central Sulawesi	National Mandate Party (PAN)	+1	Democratic Party (PD)	−2
West Papua	Prosperous Peace Party (PDS)	+1	Democratic Party (PD)	−2
Papua	Pioneers' Party (PP)	+1	United Democratic Nationhood Party (PPDK)	−1

A total of 273 disputes were brought before the Constitutional Court, the last of which were decided on 21 June. Of these cases, 38 decisions affected the final allocation of seats in the People's Representative Council and provincial and regental legislatures. The Democratic Party lost two seats, one to the National Mandate Party and Prosperous Peace Party each. The Pioneers' Party gained one seat from the United Democratic Nationhood Party. Meanwhile, the only seat allocated to the Freedom Bull National Party by the General Election Commission was reassigned to the Reform Star Party.

After the resolution of all disputes, sixteen parties received at least one seat in the People's Representative Council, while eight received none. The inconsistency in the order of parties according to votes received and seats allocated arose due to a special rule created to address uneven population distribution between Java and other islands. This rule stipulates that the Hare quota values for the provinces in Java were on average higher than those for the outer islands. A party require fewer votes to automatically secure a seat outside of Java. For example, the National Awakening Party (PKB) received more votes than the National Mandate Party (PAN) but received nearly the same number of seats. More than half of PKB seats were received in the party's stronghold of East Java, where the quota value was higher. In contrast, only four of PAN seats were automatically secured.

=== Analysis ===
Results showed that Golkar, the former ruling party of the New Order era led by People's Representative Council Speaker Akbar Tanjung, had won the most number of seats, defeating President Megawati Sukarnoputri's Indonesian Democratic Party of Struggle (PDI-P). Golkar received more votes than other parties in twenty-six out of thirty-two provinces. However, these results occurred because of declining PDI-P popularity rather than an increase in Golkar's popularity. Golkar's support in its traditional stronghold of Sulawesi declined due to the performance of medium and small parties in the region. Despite winning the largest share of vote once again in Bali, PDI-P performance there suffered the greatest after the 2002 bombings by terrorist group Jemaah Islamiyah devastated the island province's economy.

Both the National Awakening Party (PKB) and the United Development Party (PPP), both of whom were considered Islamist parties, maintained their rankings in the People's Representative Council. The PKB, co-founded by former President and former Nahdlatul Ulama Chairman Abdurrahman Wahid, continued to perform well in its stronghold of East Java despite losing votes.

The Islamic Prosperous Justice Party (PKS) and the Democratic Party (PD) finished first and second, respectively, in Jakarta, where voting patterns were considered a "barometer of Indonesian politics". Together, both parties received 43% of the vote in the capital city.

Polarisation of voting patterns based on religion was evident in the eastern provinces. Christianity-based Prosperous Peace Party (PDS) received 15% of the vote in Christian-dominated North Sulawesi and 13 seats overall in the People's Representative Council. Likewise, Muslims were more likely to vote for the PKS in regions where religious conflict has been historically prevalent.

== Aftermath ==
The 2004 legislative election was the most complicated in Indonesian history because Indonesians had to vote for representatives at the national, provincial, and regental levels. These factors made Indonesia's electoral system unique from other systems in the world. The election was described as the longest and most complicated election in the history of democracy and secured the nation's place as the world's third-largest democracy. Even before the election, the seat allocation system for the People's Representative Council was also deemed "the most complicated in the world" by several news sources across the country.

Seven political parties met the criteria to submit candidates for the July presidential election: Golkar, the Indonesian Democratic Party of Struggle (PDI-P), the National Awakening Party (PKB), the United Development Party (PPP), the Democratic Party (PD), the Prosperous Justice Party (PKS), and the National Mandate Party (PAN). The PKS was the only party not to nominate candidates, but it threw its support behind PAN's Amien Rais.

Newly elected members of the People's Representative Council (DPR) and members of the Regional Representative Council (DPD) took the oath of office in separate sessions on 1 October, one day later than was scheduled. Both houses then convened together in the early morning of 2 October and took the oath of office as the People's Consultative Assembly (MPR). Ginandjar Kartasasmita was elected the inaugural chairman of the DPD with 72 of 128 votes in a run-off against Irman Gusman on 1 October. The following day, Agung Laksono of Golkar was elected Speaker of the DPR by a vote of 280 to 257. The Chairman of the MPR was not elected until several days later when Hidayat Nur Wahid of the PKS won the vote 326 to 324 against PDI-P's Sutjipto.

On 5 October three regencies were carved out of the province of South Sulawesi to form West Sulawesi as the 33rd province of Indonesia. Because this occurred after the elections, West Sulawesi was not represented in the Regional Representative Council until the 2009 legislative election.

== See also ==
- List of members of the People's Representative Council, 2004–2009

== Bibliography ==
- Ananta, Aris; Arifin, Evi Nurvidya & Suryadinata, Leo (2005). Emerging Democracy in Indonesia. Singapore: Institute of Southeast Asian Studies. ISBN 978-981-230-322-6.
- Partai-partai Politik Indonesia: Ideologi dan Program, 2004–2009 (in Indonesian). Jakarta: Kompas. 2004. ISBN 978-979-709-121-7.
- Shimizu, Maiko & Hazri, Herizal (2004). "Indonesia: General Assembly Election, Presidential Election, 2004" (PDF). Bangkok: Asian Network for Free Elections. Archived from the original (PDF) on 26 July 2011.
- Sissener, Tone (2004). The Republic of Indonesia: General and Presidential Elections, April – September 2004 (PDF). Norwegian Centre for Human Rights. ISBN 978-82-90851-80-9.
- "The Carter Center 2004 Indonesia Election Report" (PDF). Carter Center. 2005. Archived from the original (PDF) on 14 June 2007.
