= Marissa Haque =

Indonesian actress (1962–2024)

Member of People's Representative Council
- In office 1 October 2004 – 30 August 2006
- Succeeded by: Wila Chandrawila Supriadi
- Constituency: West Java II

Personal details
- Born: Marissa Grace Haque; 15 October 1962 Balikpapan, East Kalimantan, Indonesia
- Died: 2 October 2024 (aged 61) South Tangerang, Banten, Indonesia
- Party: National Mandate Party (2012–2024)
- Other political affiliations: Indonesian Democratic Party of Struggle (2004–2006); United Development Party (2007–2012)
- Spouse: Ikang Fawzi (m. 1986)
- Education: Trisakti University (Bachelor); Atma Jaya Yogyakarta University (Master's); Gadjah Mada University (Master's); Bogor Agricultural Institute (Doctoral)
- Occupation: Actress; politician; singer

Marissa Grace (née Haque; 15 October 1962 – 2 October 2024) was an Indonesian actress and politician of Madurese, Dutch, Pakistani, and French descent. The eldest of the Haque family, she was the older sibling of Indonesian model and actor Soraya Haque, and Indonesian television actor and presenter, Shahnaz Haque. Starting her career as a film actor, she starred in Tinggal Landas buat Kekasih (1984) and Biarkan Bulan itu (1986). She won the Citra Award for Best Supporting Actress title for her performance in Tinggal Landas buat Kekasih at the Indonesian Film Festival.

== Early life and education ==
Marissa Haque was born in Balikpapan and spent her childhood moving from Kindergarten and Elementary School in Palembang, South Sumatra. She then moved to Jakarta to continue her primary education at State Elementary School Tebet Timur 03. She lived in Jakarta to follow her father, who worked as an employee of Pertamina. She continued her junior high school education at State Junior High School 73 Jakarta and senior high school at State Senior High School 8 Jakarta.

Her father, Allen Haque, was of Dutch-Indian-French descent, whereas her mother, Mieke Soeharijah bint Cakraningrat, came from Sumenep, Madura, East Java.

Haque was a law graduate from Trisakti University in the civil law field. She then completed a master's degree in the field of deaf children and language at Atma Jaya University Yogyakarta. She also graduated with master's degree in business administration (MBA) at the Faculty of Economics and Business, Gadjah Mada University, Yogyakarta. She received her doctorate in February 2012 from the Center for Environmental Studies at IPB University.

== Career ==
=== Arts and entertainment ===
Haque's introduction to entertainment began when she spent her free time singing and dancing in the "Swara Mahardika" studio led by Guruh Sukarnoputra. In 1980 a film director, M.T. Risyaf, offered her a role as an actress in Kembang Semusim. Haque is known to the public as Lux commercial star in 1985 when she won the Citra Award as Best Supporting Actress in Tinggal Landas Buat Kekasih (1984), directed by Sophan Sophian.

=== Politics ===
Haque began her political career as a member of the People's Representative Council in 2004 from the Indonesian Democratic Party of Struggle (PDIP) in the West Java II constituency, which included Bandung Regency. In June 2006, she became a Rhino Ambassador from WWF Indonesia.

Haque resigned from the People's Representative Council in August 2006 because she ran for the 2006 Banten Gubernatorial Election as vice governor candidate accompanying Zulkieflimansyah, the governor candidate appointed by the Prosperous Justice Party and the Indonesian Unity Party (PSI). She stated that she had been asked to resign by the party's general secretary, Pramono Anung, and fired by Megawati. On 30 April 2012, Haque revised her statement of "fired by PDIP" and stated that her decision to leave PDIP was due to "something that made her uncomfortable." When she was asked why PAN nominated her for Bogor constituency and not Banten, she revealed that she was "traumatized because Banten has real and systemic crimes".

After her political career at PDIP, Haque then joined the United Development Party on 7 October 2007 when the party held a Nuzul Al-Quran event at the PPP headquarters in Jakarta. She joined this party accompanied by her husband, Ikang Fawzi, and Paula Onky Alexander.

On 4 October 2012, Haque officially joined the National Mandate Party. Her move from PPP was due to reasons of principle, while the chairperson of the PPP DPP, M Yunus, confirmed her move with the reasons that she did not want to be at odds with her husband who was a PAN cadre and that PPP could not prohibit its members who wanted to move. She rejected the "hopping" label for moving to a different party for the third time and referred more to being "seduced" by Hatta Rajasa.

==== Constituency ====
In September 2012, it was reported that PAN would place Haque in the Jambi constituency with Zumi Zola. In October 2012, Haque stated that PAN would nominate her for the Bogor constituency, but in March 2013, PAN said that she would be placed in Lampung. On 10 March 2013, Haque stipulated that PAN nominated her in Bengkulu as a candidate for People's Representative Council member.

==== Controversy ====
After being declared defeated in the Banten regional head election in 2006, Haque sued the Minister of Home Affairs as Defendant I, the Banten Regional General Elections Commission as Defendant II, Panwasda as Defendant III, and the Banten Regional People's Representative Council as Defendant IV. She considered that the appointment of Ratu Atut Chosiyah as governor-elect was legally flawed and asked the court to annul the election results.

However, she was later sued by Borobudur University for spreading the accusation of the university of issuing fake diplomas for Banten Governor Ratu Atut Chosiyah.

In November 2008, the court found Haque guilty and asked her to pay 500 million rupiahs and place a quarter-page apology advertisement in the Suara Pembaruan and Rakyat Merdeka newspapers for a week in a row. Haque filed an appeal against this decision.

== Personal life and death ==
Haque married Ikang Fawzi on 3 July 1986. They first met when both acted in the film Tinggal Landas Buat Kekasih (1984), directed by Sophan Sophiaan. They had two daughters.

Haque died in her sleep from cardiac arrest at Bintaro Premiere Hospital in South Tangerang, Banten, on 2 October 2024, at the age of 61. She is buried at Tanah Kusir Cemetery.

== Filmography ==
Year	Title	Role	Notes
1980	Kembang Semusim	Mirna	Debut
1981	Bawalah Aku Pergi	Kartika	
1981	IQ Jongkok		
1982	Hukum Karma	Fitri	
1982	Tangkuban Perahu		
1983	Kamp Tawanan Wanita	Amelia	
1983	Pandawa Lima	Ulupati	
1984	Jejak Pengantin	Ani	
1984	Kontraktor		
1984	Merindukan Kasih Sayang	Lucy	
1984	Tinggal Landas buat Kekasih	Lia	
1984	Asmara di Balik Pintu	Melisa/Nisye	
1984	Gawang Gawat	Hedy	
1984	Saat-Saat yang Indah		
1984	Seandainya Aku Boleh Memilih	Tanti	
1985	Serpihan Mutiara Retak	Tiwi	
1985	Sebening Kaca	Yanti	
1985	Yang Kukuh, Yang Runtuh	Mira	
1985	Matahari-Matahari	Iyom	
1985	Melintas Badai	Emmy	
1986	Biarkan Bulan Itu	Dewi	
1986	Pesona Natalia	Ayu/Natalia	
1987	Penginapan Bu Broto		
1988	Dia Bukan Bayiku	Marini	
1989	Cinta yang Berlabuh	Sumarni	
1990	Perasaan Perempuan	Mirna	
1990	Sepondok Dua Cinta	Tati	Also as a producer
1991	Yang Tercinta	Bunga	Also as a producer

== Awards and nominations ==
Year	Awards	Category	Work	Results
1985	Indonesian Film Festival	Best Supporting Actress	Tinggal Landas buat Kekasih	Won
1987	Indonesian Film Festival	Best Actress	Biarkan Bulan Itu	Nominated

== Electoral history ==
Election	Legislative Institution	Constituency	Political Parties	Votes	Result
2004	People's Representative Council	Jawa Barat II	Indonesian Democratic Party of Struggle	Unknown	Elected
2009	People's Representative Council	Jawa Barat I	United Development Party	Unknown	Not Elected
2014	People's Representative Council	Bengkulu	National Mandate Party	23.167	Not Elected
