= Concern for the Nation Functional Party =

Defunct political party in Indonesia

Concern for the Nation Functional Party Partai Karya Peduli Bangsa
- Abbreviation: PKPB
- Chairman: R. Hartono
- Secretary-General: Hartarto Sastrosoenarto
- Founders: R. Hartono; Ary Mardjono; Namoeri Anoem
- Founded: 9 September 2002; 23 years ago
- Dissolved: 1 April 2013; 13 years ago
- Split from: Golkar
- Merged into: Indonesian Justice and Unity Party
- Headquarters: Jakarta
- Ideology: Pancasila; Indonesian nationalism Populism; Reactionism; Suhartoism
- Political position: Centre-right to right-wing
- National affiliation: People's Coalition (2004–2009)

Website
- Official website

The Concern for the Nation Functional Party (Indonesian: Partai Karya Peduli Bangsa) is a right-wing reactionary political party in Indonesia. The party was established by former members of the Golkar Party who were dissatisfied with Golkar's abandonment of former president Suharto including former minister Hartono and Suharto's daughter Siti Hardiyanti Rukmana. Suharto himself approved the party name.

In the 2004 legislative election, the party won 2.1% of the popular vote and 2 out of 500 seats in the Regional Representatives Council. In the 2009 legislative election, the party won only 1.4 percent of the votes, less than the 2.5 percent electoral threshold, meaning it lost both seats in the council, as well as receiving no seats in the People's Representative Council.

== Election results ==
=== Legislative election results ===
Election	Ballot number	Leader	Seats		Votes		Status
Election	Ballot number	Leader	No.	±	Total	%	Status
2004	2	R. Hartono	2 / 550		2,399,290	2.11%	Opposition
2009	14	R. Hartono	0 / 560	▼2	1,461,375	1.40%	Governing coalition

=== Presidential election results ===
Election	Ballot number	Candidate	Running mate	1st round (Total votes)	Share of votes	Outcome	2nd round (Total votes)	Share of votes	Outcome
2004	1	Wiranto	Salahuddin Wahid	26,286,788	22.15%	Eliminated	Runoff		
2009	2	Susilo Bambang Yudhoyono	Boediono	73,874,562	60.80%	Elected			

== Regional strength ==
In the legislative election held on 9 April 2009, support for the PKPB was higher than the party's national average in the following provinces:

West Sumatra 1.4%

Bengkulu 2.2%

Jambi 2.5%

South Sumatra 1.7%

Lampung 2.7%

West Java 1.8%

Banten 1.8%

Yogyakarta 1.7%

West Kalimantan 1.9%

South Kalimantan 1.7%

Bali 1.5%

West Nusa Tenggara 2.4%

East Nusa Tenggara 1.7%

West Sulawesi 1.6%

Central Sulawesi 2.4%

South East Sulawesi 2.8%
