= Freedom Party (Indonesia) =

Freedom Party Partai Merdeka
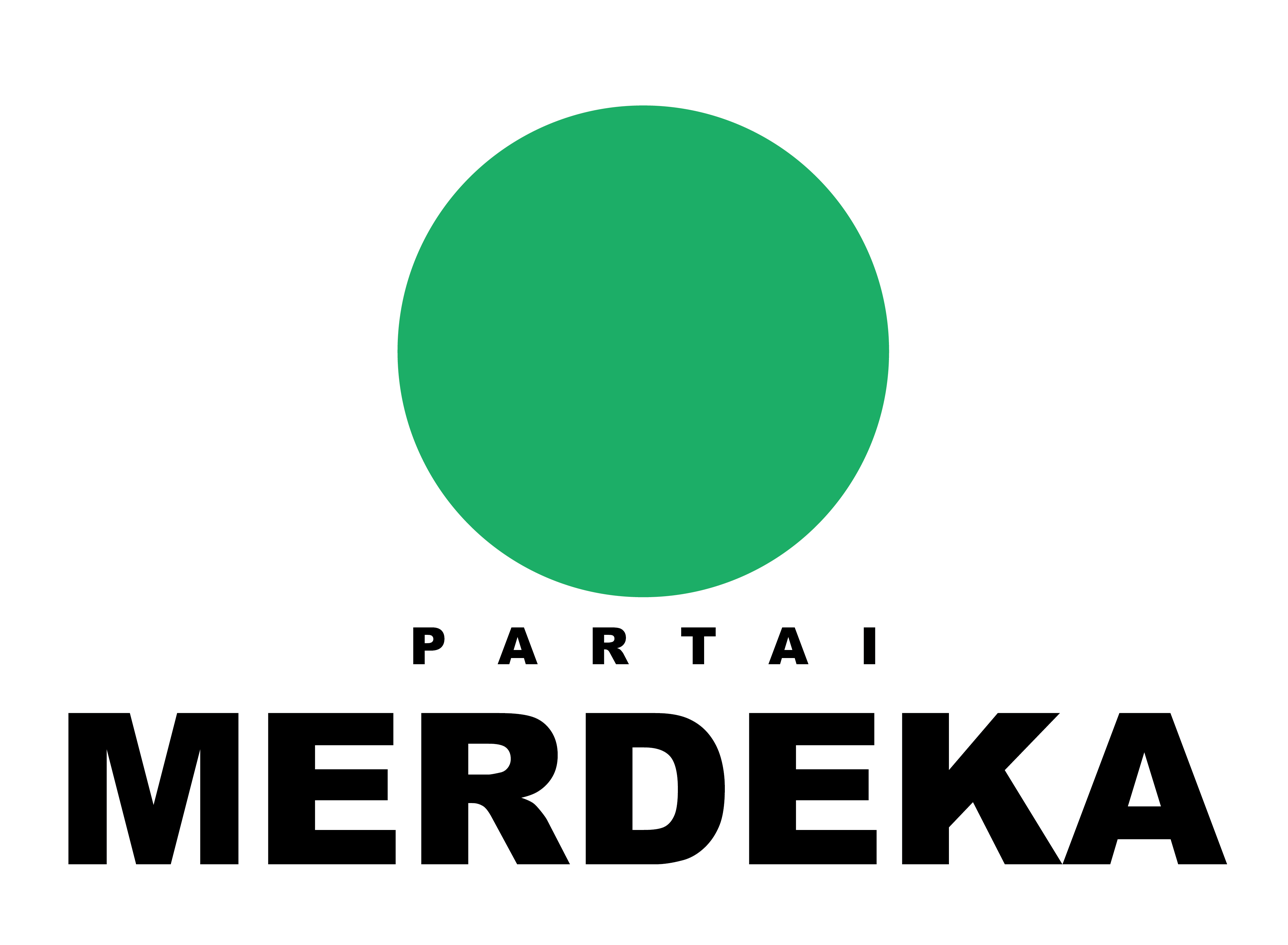
- Chairman: Rosmawi Hasan
- Secretary-General: Ahmad Muzani
- Founder: Adi Sasono
- Founded: 10 October 2002
- Dissolved: 1 June 2011
- Merged into: National Unity Party
- Headquarters: Jakarta
- Ideology: Pancasila
- Political position: Centre
- Ballot number: 41
- DPR seats: 0

Website
- Partai Merdeka

The Freedom Party (Indonesian: Partai Merdeka) was a political party in Indonesia. It was established in 2002 as a reaction to the disappointment felt by several economic activists to the failure of the new Indonesian parties established after the end of the New Order regime to make meaningful changes to the political system. Rather than fighting for political aims, the party focus is on bringing about a people's economy. The three main principles of the party were nationhood, rule by the people and independence.

In the 2004 legislative election, the party won 0.7% of the popular vote and no seats. After initially failing to qualify, following a lawsuit it contested the 2009 elections, but came last, winning only 0.11% of the popular vote, from the electoral threshold of 2.50% and for the second time, no seats. Following its poor result in the 2009 vote, the party joined nine other smaller parties to form the National Unity Party (Indonesian: Partai Persatuan Nasional).

== Election results ==
=== Presidential election results ===
Election	Ballot number	Candidate	Running mate	1st round (Total votes)	Share of votes	Outcome	2nd round (Total votes)	Share of votes	Outcome
2004	4	Megawati Sukarnoputri	Hasyim Muzadi	31,569,104	26.61%	Runoff	73,874,562	60.80%	Lost
2009	2	Megawati Sukarnoputri	Prabowo Subianto	32,548,105	26.59%	Lost			

=== Legislative election results ===
Election	Ballot number	Leader	Total seats won	Seat change	Total votes	Share of votes	Outcome of election
2004	4	Adi Sasono	0 / 550		842,541	0.74%	Opposition
2009	41	Rosmawi Hasan	0 / 560	0	111,069	0.11%	Opposition
