= List of members of the Regional Representative Council (Indonesia), 2004–2009 =

This article lists the members of the Indonesian Regional Representative Council from 2004 to 2009. The first Regional Representative Council follows the 2004 Indonesian legislative election held on 5 April 2004. There are 128 elected senators in the Parliament.

Even though the senators were required to be independent, several senators were affiliated to certain political party.

== Speaker and deputy speaker ==
Name	Photo	Position	Political affiliation	Province	Notes
Ginandjar Kartasasmita		Speaker	Golkar	West Java	
Irman Gusman		Deputy Speaker	Independent	West Sumatra	
La Ode Ida		Deputy Speaker	Independent	Southeast Sulawesi	

== List of members ==
Province	Image	Name	Born	Political affiliation	Occupation(s)	Votes	Notes
Aceh		Abdul Malik Raden	17 August 1945	Independent	Commissioner of Krakatau Steel	211,362	
Aceh		Helmi Mahera Al Mujahid	16 September 1961	Independent	unknown	163,683	
Aceh		Adnan NS	14 August 1955	Nasdem	Journalist	145,733	
Aceh		Mediati Hafni Hanum	15 July 1965	Nasdem	Notary	27,207	
North Sumatra		Parlindungan Purba	22 October 1963	Independent	Entrepreneur	440,032	
North Sumatra		Nurdin Tampubolon	29 December 1954	People's Conscience Party	CEO of Nurdin Tampubolon Family	321,570	
North Sumatra		Raja Inal Siregar	5 April 1938	Golkar	Politician	316,358	Died on 5 September 2005.
North Sumatra		Yopie Sangkot Batubara	2 April 1943	Independent	Entrepreneur	277,649	
North Sumatra		Lundu Panjaitan	9 April 1949	Golkar	Commissioner of Toba Pulp Lestari Company	217,838	Replacing Raja Inal Siregar.
West Sumatra		Irman Gusman	11 February 1962	Independent	Politician	348,200	
West Sumatra		Zairin Kasim	8 August 1945	Independent	Businessman	171,962	
West Sumatra		Afdal	15 September 1969	Prosperous Justice Party	Pharmacist	170,872	
West Sumatra		Muchtar Naim	25 December 1932	Independent	Anthropologist; Sociologist	116,795	
Riau		Soemardi Thaher	24 July 1941	Independent	Politician	226,570	
Riau		Dinawati	21 August 1971	National Awakening Party	Baker	140,069	
Riau		Intsiawati Ayus	4 May 1968	Independent	Politician	125,890	
Riau		Maimanah Umar	5 May 1937	Independent	Politician	124,129	
