= Democratic Nationhood Party =

Democratic Nationhood Party Partai Demokrasi Kebangsaan
- Chairman: Ryaas Rasyid
- Secretary-General: Kun Wardana Abyoto
- Founders: Ryaas Rasyid; Andi Mallarangeng
- Founded: 28 July 2002
- Dissolved: 1 June 2011
- Merged into: National Unity Party
- Headquarters: Jakarta, Indonesia
- Ideology: Pancasila; Populism
- Political position: Centre-right
- Ballot number: 20

Website
- http://www.pdk.or.id/

The Democratic Nationhood Party (Indonesian: Partai Demokrasi Kebangsaan) was a political party in Indonesia. It was established in 2002 as the United Democratic Nationhood Party by a group of intellectuals including Ryaas Rasyid and Andi Mallarangeng, formerly president Susilo Bambang Yudhoyono's spokesman, who were disatissfied with the progress of the reform movement following the Fall of Suharto.

== History ==
In the 2004 Indonesian legislative election, the party won 1.16% of the popular vote and 4 out of 550 seats. In the 2009 elections, the party stood as the Democratic Nationhood Party. The party set itself a target of 4 million votes in the election, in which it stood on a platform of creating a transparent, accountable and efficient administration. In the 2009 legislative election, the party won 0.6 percent of the vote, less than the 2.5 percent electoral threshold, meaning it lost its seats in the People's Representative Council. Following its poor result in the 2009 vote, the party joined nine other smaller parties to form the National Unity Party (Indonesian: Partai Persatuan Nasional).

== Election results ==
=== Presidential election results ===
Election	Ballot number	Candidate	Running mate	1st round (Total votes)	Share of votes	Outcome	2nd round (Total votes)	Share of votes	Outcome
2004	4	Wiranto	Salahuddin Wahid	26,286,788	22.15%	Lost	Eliminated		
2009	3	Jusuf Kalla	Wiranto	15,081,814	12.41%	Lost			

=== Legislative election results ===
Election	Ballot number	Leader	Seats		Votes		Outcome of election
Election	Ballot number	Leader	No.	±	Total	%	Outcome of election
2004	6	Ryaas Rasyid	4 / 550		1,313,654	1.16%	Opposition
2009	20	Ryaas Rasyid	0 / 560	▼4	671,356	0.65%	Opposition
