= Sutjipto =

Sutjipto is a surname. Notable people with the surname include:

- Airlangga Sutjipto (born 1985), Indonesian former football forward
- Widodo Adi Sutjipto (born 1944), Indonesian commander
