= Prosperous Peace Party =

Prosperous Peace Party Partai Damai Sejahtera
- Abbreviation: PDS
- Chairman: Denny Tewu (Acting)
- General Secretary: Sahat Sinaga (Acting)
- Founded: 1 October 2001
- Dissolved: 10 March 2013
- Merged into: People's Conscience Party
- Headquarters: Jakarta
- Ideology: Pancasila; Christian democracy
- Political position: Centre-right
- Religion: Christianity
- National affiliation: National Coalition (2004–2009)

The Prosperous Peace Party (Indonesian: Partai Damai Sejahtera) was a Christian-democratic political party in Indonesia. It portrayed itself as the reincarnation of Parkindo, the Indonesian Christian Party, which contested the 1955 and 1971 elections. Although it was initially founded by Christians, the party was open to all religions, and 21 of its candidates in the 2009 legislative election were Muslim.

In the 2004 Indonesian legislative election, the party won 2.1% of the popular vote and 12 out of 550 seats, but in the 2009 legislative election, the party won 1.5 percent of the votes, less than the required 2.5 percent electoral threshold, meaning it lost all its seats in the People's Representative Council.

The party agreed to merge along with 9 other parties into Hanura on 10 March 2013 after failing to be certified to contest in the 2014 legislative election by the Electoral Commission.

== Election results ==
=== Presidential election results ===
Election	Ballot number	Candidate	Running mate	1st round (Total votes)	Share of votes	Outcome	2nd round (Total votes)	Share of votes	Outcome
2004	2	Megawati Sukarnoputri	Hasyim Muzadi	31,569,104	26.61%	Runoff	73,874,562	60.80%	Lost
2009	2	Susilo Bambang Yudhoyono	Boediono	70,997,833	53.15%	Elected			

=== Legislative election results ===
Election	Ballot number	Leader	Seats		Votes		Outcome of election
Election	Ballot number	Leader	No.	±	Total	%	Outcome of election
2004	19	Ruyandi Hutasoit	13 / 550		2,414,254	2.13%	Opposition
2009	25	Ruyandi Hutasoit	0 / 560	▼13	1,522,032	1.46%	Governing coalition
