= Akbar Tandjung =

Indonesian politician (born 1945)

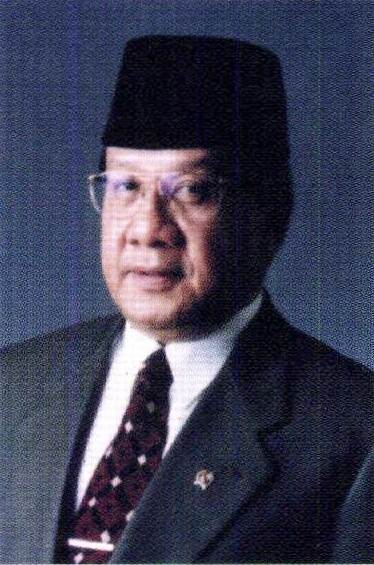
- Official portrait, 1999

13th Speaker of the House of Representatives
- In office 6 October 1999 – 30 September 2004
- Preceded by: Harmoko
- Succeeded by: Agung Laksono

7th General Chairman of Golkar Party
- In office 11 July 1998 – 19 December 2004
- Preceded by: Harmoko
- Succeeded by: Jusuf Kalla

Member of House of Representatives
- In office 1 October 1999 – 1 October 2004
- In office 1 October 1977 – 21 March 1988
Ministerial offices
7th Minister of the State Secretariat
In office 23 May 1998 – 20 October 1999
President	B. J. Habibie
Preceded by	Saadilah Mursyid
Succeeded by	Muladi (acting)
3rd Minister of Public Housing
In office 17 March 1993 – 21 May 1998
President	Suharto
Preceded by	Siswono Yudo Husodo
Succeeded by	Theo L. Sambuaga
5th Minister of Youth and Sports
In office 21 March 1988 – 17 March 1993
President	Suharto
Preceded by	Abdul Gafur
Succeeded by	Hayono Isman

Personal details
- Born: Djandji Akbar Zahiruddin Tandjung; 14 August 1945 (age 81) Sorkam, Central Tapanuli, Japanese East Indies
- Party: Golkar
- Spouse: Krisnina Maharani (m. 1960)
- Education: University of Indonesia; Gadjah Mada University
- Occupation: Politician; legislator

Djandji Akbar Zahiruddin Tandjung (born 14 August 1945) is an Indonesian politician who served as the Speaker of the People's Representative Council from 1999 until 2004. A member of the Golkar party, he also served as the party's chairman from 1999 until 2004 and was a member of the People's Representative Council from East Java from 1977 until 2004.

He served as a minister under former presidents Suharto and B.J. Habibie. He was Speaker of the People's Representative Council (DPR) from 1999 to 2004. In 2002 he was convicted of corruption over the embezzlement of funds intended for food relief for the poor, but the conviction was overturned on appeal in 2004.

== Early life and education ==
Djandji Akbar Zahiruddin Tandjung was born on 14 August 1945 in Sorkam, North Sumatra during the Japanese occupation of the Dutch East Indies. The son of Zahiruddin Tandjung and Siti Kasmijah, he is a Muslim Pesisir by ethnicity. He is the 13th of 16 siblings, four of whom died before adulthood.

He attended the Muhammadiyah People's School in Sorkam, Central Tapanuli, North Sumatra province. He also attended Christian Elementary School in Medan, North Sumatra. In Jakarta, he attended Cikini Junior High School and then Kanisius High School, graduating in 1964.

He studied at the University of Indonesia, where he engaged in student activism and served as president of the Faculty of Technology. From 1972 to 1974, he was president of the influential Indonesian Muslim Students Association (HMI). He also joined the Indonesian National Youth Committee (KNPI), which is affiliated with Golkar.

== Political career ==
In 1976, then-Golkar leader Amir Murtono invited Akbar to stand for election for the party. In 1977, Akbar was elected to the House of Representatives, representing Golkar for East Java province. He was re-elected in 1982 and 1987. In the late 1980s, when long-serving president Suharto started to more actively seek Muslim support, Akbar became deputy secretary general of Golkar. Under Suharto, he served as State Minister for Youth Affairs and Sport from 1988 to 1993. He then served as State Minister of Housing from March 1993 to May 1998. Under Suharto's successor B.J. Habibie, he served as State Secretary from May 1998 to May 1999.

He was chairman of Golkar from 1998 to 2004, helping to rebuild the party following Suharto's 1998 resignation. At the Golkar convention in December 2004, Akbar lost the party's chairmanship to Jusuf Kalla, at that time the country's vice president.

Akbar has remained an influential figure within Golkar. Ahead of the 2014 Indonesian presidential election, he criticized Golkar's plan to nominate then-party chairman Aburizal Bakrie for the presidency. The party ended up dropping Bakrie as its candidate and threw its weight behind Prabowo Subianto, with Akbar serving as one of his campaign advisers.

In 2017, Akbar expressed concern that Golkar could lose legislative seats in Indonesia's 2019 elections because of a negative public perception of its chairman, Setya Novanto. He said the party should make changes to improve its image.

== Corruption conviction, appeal, and acquittal ==
In September 2002, Central Jakarta District Court sentenced Akbar to three years in prison for embezzling Rp 40 billion (about $4.8 million) in state funds that were supposed to have been spent on a 1999 food program for the poor. Prosecutors had recommended a four-year prison sentence, although the maximum penalty for corruption and abuse of power is 20 years. Two other people involved in the scandal, Dadang Sukandar and Winfried Simatupang, were each sentenced to 18 months in prison. The two served their time in Jakarta's Cipinang penitentiary, but Akbar never went to prison. He remained free pending a lengthy appeal process and continued to hold his government and political jobs. In January 2003, the Jakarta High Court upheld his conviction. In February 2004, a panel of five Supreme Court judges overturned Akbar's corruption conviction on the grounds he had just been following orders in 1999 from then-president B.J. Habibie. After the ruling, a dissenting judge, Abdul Rahman Saleh, said Akbar had engaged in "corrupt practice" and was guilty of "shameful conduct because he failed to show minimal appropriate efforts to protect state money”.

== Honours ==
=== National ===
- Star of the Republic of Indonesia (3rd Class) (Indonesian: Bintang Republik Indonesia Utama) (1998)
- Star of Mahaputera (2nd Class) (Indonesian: Bintang Mahaputera Adipradana) (1992)

=== Foreign honours ===
- Japan
  - Grand Cordon of the Order of the Rising Sun (2022)
- Netherlands
  - Knight Grand Cross of the Order of Orange-Nassau (1996)

Political offices
Preceded by Harmoko	Speaker of the House of Representatives; 1999–2004	Succeeded by Agung Laksono
Preceded by Saadilah Mursjid	State Minister/State Secretary; 1998–1999	Succeeded by Muladi
Party political offices
Preceded by Harmoko	General Chairman of the Golkar Party; 1998–2004	Succeeded by Jusuf Kalla
