= Salahuddin Wahid =

Indonesian politician (1942–2020)

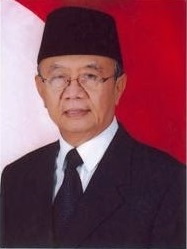
- Wahid as a vice-presidential nominee in 2004

Member of People's Consultative Assembly
- In office 1998 – 30 September 1999

Personal details
- Born: 11 September 1942 Jombang, Japanese Indies
- Died: 2 February 2020 (aged 77) Jakarta, Indonesia
- Spouse: Farida
- Relations: Wahid Hasyim (father); Abdurrahman Wahid (brother)
- Children: 3
- Parents: Wahid Hasyim (father); Solehah binti K.H. Bisri Syansuri (mother)
- Education: Bandung Institute of Technology

Salahuddin Wahid (11 September 1942 – 2 February 2020), colloquially known as Gus Solah, was an Indonesian Islamic scholar and politician. He originated from a Nahdlatul Ulama family, and was the younger brother of Indonesian president Abdurrahman Wahid. He served in the country's People's Consultative Assembly (1998–1999), and as the vice chair of the National Commission on Human Rights (2002–2004). During the 2004 Indonesian presidential election, he became the running mate to Wiranto, though the ticket lost the election.

== Early life and family ==
Salahuddin Wahid was born in Jombang, in East Java, on 11 September 1942. His father was Wahid Hasyim, and his grandfather was Hasyim Asy'ari, the founder of Nahdlatul Ulama (NU). He attended public schools in Jakarta, graduating from SMPN 1 Cikini and SMAN 1 Jakarta, before obtaining a degree in architecture from the Bandung Institute of Technology.

He married Farida, daughter of former Minister of Religious Affairs Saifuddin Zuhri and sister of future minister to the same office Lukman Hakim Saifuddin, in 1968. The couple had three children.

== Career ==
After graduating from his studies, Salahuddin worked in architecture and had leadership positions in construction companies, but departed these roles following the Asian financial crisis. Between 1998 and 1999, Salahuddin served in the People's Consultative Assembly. Following the fall of Suharto, multiple political parties were established which were related to NU, including the National Awakening Party (PKB) and the Ummat Awakening Party (PKU). Salahuddin's brother and later president Abdurrahman Wahid (Gus Dur) joined PKB, while Salahuddin joined PKU. The two engaged in public debates published by the newspaper Media Indonesia during October 1998, on the topic of their father's vision for the country. Gus Dur argued that Wahid Hasyim supported Pancasila (the state ideology of Indonesia), while Salahuddin argued that he supported a state based on Islam. Salahuddin left PKU in September 1999.

In 1999, Salahuddin ran for the chairmanship of NU. He placed third in the first round of voting, but withdrew from the second round. Later, in 2002 he became the vice chair of the National Commission on Human Rights (KOMNAS HAM). In the organisation, he led a team investigating Wiranto for human rights violations in East Timor following the 1999 independence referendum, which eventually released a conclusion absolving Wiranto's responsibility on significant violations. He also led the fact-seeking teams related to human rights violations during the May 1998 riots and in the Buru camps.

Wiranto later selected Salahuddin as his running mate in the 2004 Indonesian presidential election. Salahuddin represented PKB, which was in coalition with Golkar, Wiranto's supporting party. Salahuddin resigned from NU's central committee and KOMNAS HAM in order to participate in the election. The ticket finished third with 22.15 percent of the votes, preventing them from advancing to the run-off which was later won by Susilo Bambang Yudhoyono and Jusuf Kalla.

From 2006 until his death, Salahuddin took care of the Tebuireng pesantren, which was founded by his grandfather.

=== Death ===
In January 2020, Salahuddin underwent an ablation in Harapan Kita Heart Hospital, Jakarta. He was later readmitted to the hospital because he reported problems following the procedure, which required a surgery on 31 January. His condition did not improve after the surgery and he died at 20:55 local time on 2 February. On 3 February, his body was flown to Jombang, where his funeral was held in the afternoon. He was buried in the Tebuireng burial grounds, in the same complex near his parents, grandparents, and his late brother Abdurrahman Wahid.

== Views ==
Salahuddin called for NU to avoid politics. He also called for the protection of Ahmadiyya followers–who face persecution in Indonesia–and called for the government to make use of the Constitution and the country's laws rather than Indonesian Ulema Council's fatwas as a point of reference. Salahuddin also stated that while he personally believed that the Ahmadiyya movement was theologically wrong, an organisation could only be disbanded if it violated the laws, and the disbandment must be done through legal means instead of pressure from religious groups.
