= 2004 Indonesian presidential election =

- 5 July 2004 (first round); 20 September 2004 (second round)
- Registered: 155,048,803
- Turnout: 78.23 (first round); 75.24% (second round) ▼2.99 pp
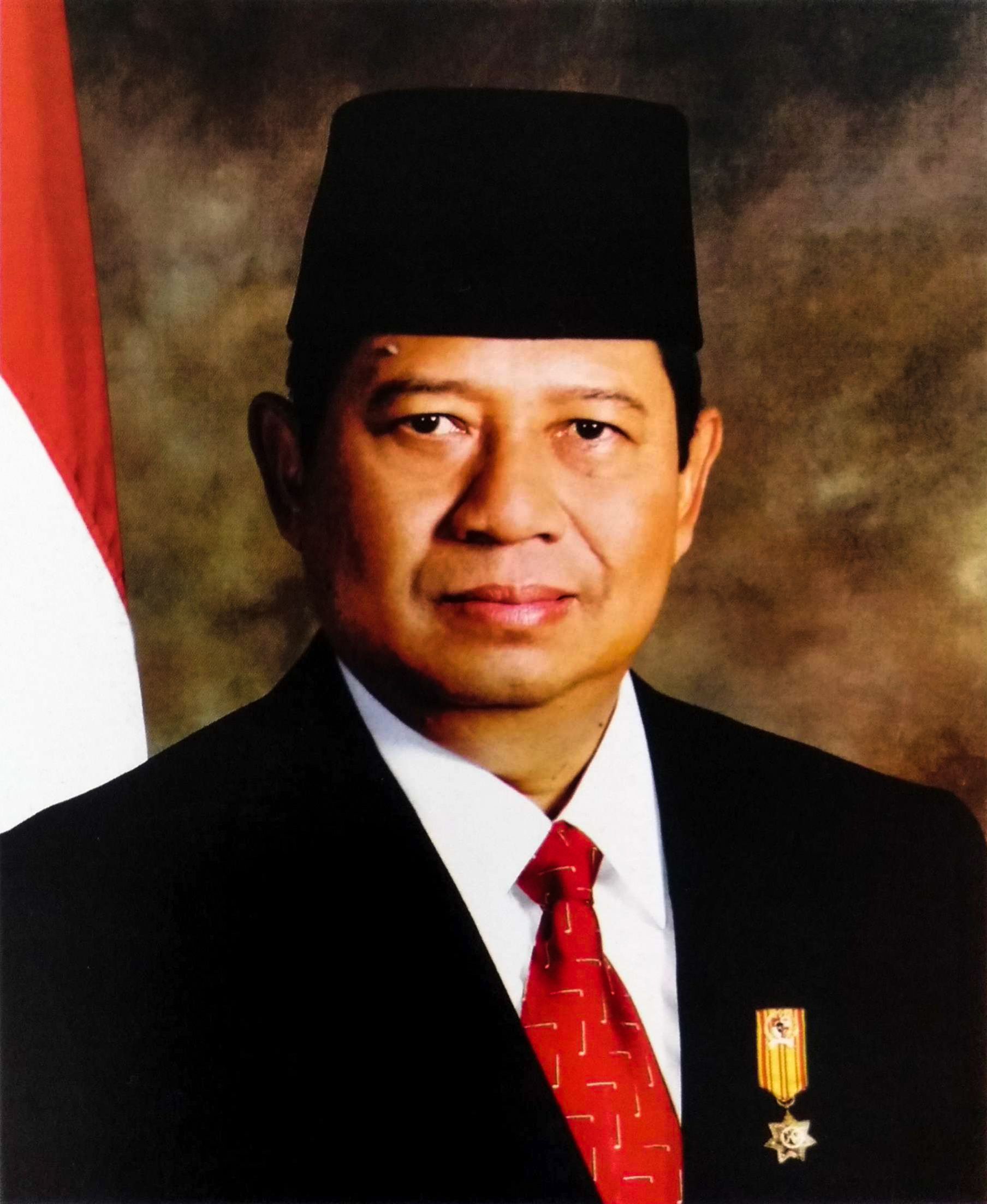

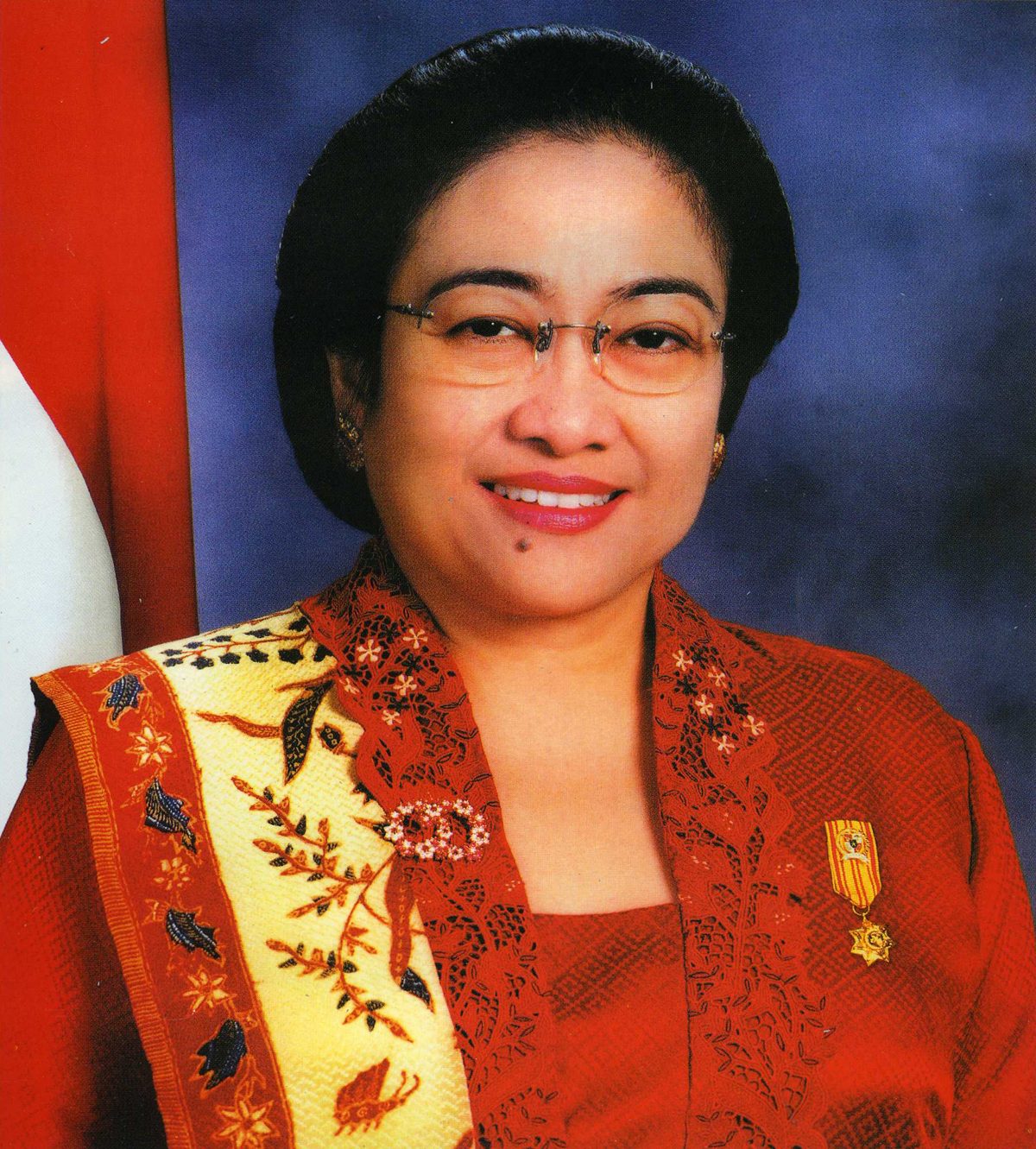
Candidate	Susilo Bambang Yudhoyono	Megawati Sukarnoputri
Party	Demokrat	PDI-P
Alliance	People's Coalition (Note: Including Democratic, the Prosperous Justice Party, the Reform Star Party, the National Mandate Party and the National Awakening Party)	National Coalition (Note: Including PDI-P, Golkar, the United Development Party and the Prosperous Peace Party)
Running mate	Jusuf Kalla	Hasyim Muzadi
First round	39,838,184; 33.57%	31,569,104; 26.61%
Second round	69,266,350; 60.62%	44,990,704; 39.38%
President before election
Megawati Sukarnoputri
PDI-P
Elected President
Susilo Bambang Yudhoyono
Demokrat

Presidential elections were held in Indonesia on 5 July and 20 September 2004. As no candidate won a majority in the first round, a runoff was held, in which Susilo Bambang Yudhoyono defeated Megawati Sukarnoputri and was elected president. They were the first direct presidential elections in the history of Indonesia; prior to a 2002 amendment to the Constitution of Indonesia, both the president and vice president had been elected by the People's Consultative Assembly (MPR).

Under the new amendment, a candidate pair is elected into office after receiving more than 50% of the vote nationally with at least 20% of the vote in more than half of the provinces of Indonesia. If no pair receives the number of votes required, the election will continue into the second round with the pairs receiving the highest and second-highest number of votes. Further regulations set by the General Elections Commission (KPU) state that each pair must be nominated by a political party or coalition of parties which received at least 5% of the popular vote or 3% of the seats to the People's Representative Council (DPR) in the April legislative election.

The incumbent, Megawati Sukarnoputri, rose to the presidency following the impeachment of her predecessor, Abdurrahman Wahid, from office. Megawati's bid for a full term was challenged by four candidates, including incumbent vice president Hamzah Haz. In the first round, former cabinet member and retired general Susilo Bambang Yudhoyono received a plurality of the valid ballots submitted, followed by Megawati. Yudhoyono eventually defeated Megawati with 60.62% of the valid ballots in the second round. He was inaugurated as the sixth president of Indonesia on 20 October 2004.

== Background ==
In the 1999 legislative election, the Indonesian Democratic Party of Struggle (PDI-P) won the most number of seats in the People's Representative Council (DPR) and became the largest faction in the People's Consultative Assembly (MPR), the legislative body responsible for electing the president of Indonesia. The PDI-P was led by Megawati Sukarnoputri, the daughter of Sukarno, Indonesia's first president. Megawati's supporters had expected her to be elected president by the MPR, but she failed to reach out to parties other than the National Awakening Party (PKB). Her only opponent at the time was President B. J. Habibie, who came into office in May 1998, but he withdrew his candidacy after his accountability speech was rejected by the MPR.

The PKB, which was led by Abdurrahman Wahid, the leader of Indonesia's largest Islamic organisation Nahdlatul Ulama (NU), had also pledged to support Megawati for president. However, it became clear that Megawati did not have enough votes to back her candidacy. Additionally, National Mandate Party (PAN) leader Amien Rais and his Central Axis (Indonesian: Poros Tengah), a coalition of Islamic and reform parties, began pushing for Wahid's candidacy. Wahid eventually won the MPR's presidential election, and Megawati was elected as vice president. As president, he repealed many of the laws enacted during the Suharto era that discriminated against Chinese Indonesians. Among these was the banning on the use of Chinese characters and display of images relating to Chinese culture. Following this act, many political parties began to reach out to Chinese Indonesians for their votes by displaying Chinese characters on campaign material.

Following Wahid's impeachment and removal from office by the MPR in July 2001, the legislative body elevated Megawati to the presidency. She would complete the remainder of Abdurrahman's five-year term, ending in October 2004. During its 2002 annual session, the MPR added a series of amendments to the Constitution of Indonesia, including the removal of the military's 38 appointed seats in the Assembly, and an amendment for direct election of the president and vice president. This presidential election process would involve political parties nominating a presidential and vice-presidential ticket with the option of a runoff election.

== Candidates ==
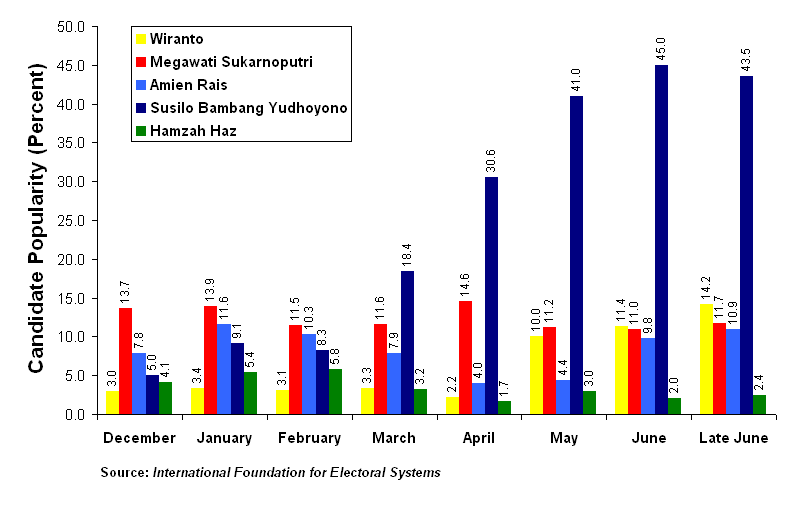
A series of tracking surveys conducted by the International Foundation for Electoral Systems between December 2003 and late June 2004 showed the popularity of each presidential candidate among voters throughout the selection and campaign periods.

In December 2003, the International Foundation for Electoral Systems (IFES) began a tracking survey in order to assess the popularity of potential candidates. The survey continued until the start of the first election round on 5 July and included thirteen possible candidates for president. The first IFES survey indicated that incumbent President Megawati Sukarnoputri received a plurality of the votes. However, by the time of the April 2004 legislative election, retired General Susilo Bambang Yudhoyono had taken the lead from Megawati after resigning from her cabinet in March. Other potential candidates included DPR Speaker Akbar Tanjung and Yogyakarta Sultan Hamengkubuwana X.

The results of the legislative election determined which political parties were eligible to submit presidential tickets. Only parties which received at least 5% of the popular vote or 3% of seats (17 of 550 seats) in the DPR would be allowed to submit candidates. Parties that did not meet these criteria must join with other parties to meet at least one criterion. Seven political parties met these criteria: Golkar, the Indonesian Democratic Party of Struggle (PDI-P), the National Awakening Party (PKB), the United Development Party (PPP), the Democratic Party (PD), the Prosperous Justice Party (PKS), and the National Mandate Party (PAN). The PKS was the only party not to nominate candidates, but it later threw its support behind the PAN.

The KPU announced the final list of candidates on 14 May. Following the announcement, all candidates were required to undergo medical screening. On 22 May, the commission announced that the PKB's presidential candidate, former President Abdurrahman Wahid, had failed the eye test and was not allowed to enter in the election. He initially told supporters not to vote for a presidential candidate on election day but decided to retract that statement after pressure from the party.

=== Wiranto and Salahuddin Wahid ===
Vote share of Wiranto and Salahuddin Wahid in the first round in each city and regency

1
2004 Golkar ticket
Wiranto	Salahuddin Wahid	Political party
for President	for Vice President	Political party
		Golkar PDK Patriot
Coordinating Minister for Political & Security Affairs (1999–2000); Indonesian National Armed Forces Commander (1998–1999)	Member of People's Consultative Assembly (1998–1999)	Golkar PDK Patriot

Golkar had won the April legislative election after losing to the PDI-P five years prior. The party nominated retired General Wiranto and Salahuddin Wahid, deputy chairman of the National Human Rights Commission, for its presidential ticket. The pair was assigned the number 1 for its ballot.

Wiranto was an adjutant to former President Suharto in 1989–1993. During this time, he rapidly rose to the rank of full general and eventually became the head of the National Armed Forces. When riots broke out throughout the country in 1998 against Suharto, he refused to take control in order to avoid the deaths of protesting university students. In 1999, as East Timor held an independence referendum, Wiranto was accused of having taken part in inciting violence among East Timorese along with several other officers; however, he was never issued an arrest warrant by Interpol. Under President Abdurrahman Wahid, Wiranto served as the Coordinating Minister for Political and Security Affairs but was later dismissed. On 20 April 2004, the Golkar Convention voted to nominate him for president over DPR Speaker Akbar Tanjung in the second round of voting.

On 9 May Golkar selected Salahuddin Wahid (also known as Gus Sholah) as its vice-presidential candidate after an endorsement was made by his brother Abdurrahman. Because Salahuddin was also a deputy chairman of the Central Board of Nahdlatul Ulama, many NU members criticised him for not adhering to the organisation's khittah, which affirmed the NU's status as a non-political organisation. With this nomination, PKB leaders officially supported the Wiranto–Salahuddin pair for the election.

Salahuddin's position on the human rights commission helped the reputation of Wiranto. However, because both candidates were of Javanese background, they were not expected to attract as many voters who were not Javanese.

=== Megawati Sukarnoputri and Hasyim Muzadi ===
Vote share of Megawati Sukarnoputri and Hasyim Muzadi in the first round in each city and regency

2
2004 Indonesian Democratic Party of Struggle ticket
Megawati Sukarnoputri	Hasyim Muzadi	Political party
for President	for Vice President	Political party
		PDI-P PDS
5th President of Indonesia (2001–2004)	Chairman of the Nahdlatul Ulama (1999–2010)	PDI-P PDS

Incumbent President Megawati Sukarnoputri was the PDI-P's top nominee. She was joined by vice-presidential candidate Hasyim Muzadi, general chairman of Indonesia's largest Islamic organisation Nahdlatul Ulama (NU). The pair was assigned the number 2 for its ballot.

According to a report released by the National Democratic Institute for International Affairs, Megawati has a "unique burden of being the only candidate in the race who is held responsible for the current situation most voters are unhappy with" although several other candidates have been members of her government. However, the general discontent for her presidency was attributed mainly to the failure of the government to communicate Megawati's achievements rather than the state of the country itself. The PDI–P came in second during the April legislative election with 18.5% of the votes, a reduction by almost half from the 33.7% it had received in 1999.

Hasyim Muzadi had been mentioned as a possible running mate for Megawati as early as November 2003. His candidacy was officially announced by Megawati on 6 May. As Chairman of the Central Board of Nahdlatul Ulama, he was criticised by many NU members for not adhering to the organisation's khittah and the principle of political neutrality. Muslim intellectual Nurcholish Madjid had called on him to step down from the position following the announcement of the candidacy.

The two candidates' Javanese background were not expected to attract as many non-Javanese voters. However, the candidates' status as civilians attracted those who did not favour candidates with a military background, and they also were expected to attract both secular and religious voters.

=== Amien Rais and Siswono Yudo Husodo ===
Vote share of Amien Rais and Siswono Yudo Husodo in the first round in each city and regency

3
2004 National Mandate Party ticket
Amien Rais	Siswono Yudo Husodo	Political party
for President	for Vice President	Political party
		PAN PKS PBR PNBK PNIM PBSD
Speaker of the People's Consultative Assembly (1999–2004)	Minister of Transmigration and Forest Settlement (1993–1998)	PAN PKS PBR PNBK PNIM PBSD

The PAN nominated Amien Rais, chairman of the MPR, as its presidential candidate. His running mate was Siswono Yudohusodo. The pair was assigned the number 3 for its ballot.

Amien Rais had once served as the chairman of Muhammadiyah. However, despite leading the second-largest Islamic organisation in Indonesia, Amien established the PAN following the resignation of President Suharto as a party not based on religious affiliation. He became an influential figure in the early days of the reform period and was eventually elected to lead the MPR. Among voters, he was seen as a candidate who had no association with the corruption that was endemic to the nation's government. Voters also saw him as an ambitious person and as one who was known for being an orator. Amien's party had received 6.4% of the votes during the legislative election.

On the other hand, Siswono Yudohusodo was a relative newcomer to the political scene. He served as the chairman of the Indonesian Farmers' Association (HKTI) and held ministerial positions during the later years of Suharto's presidency. Siswono was the wealthiest of any candidate for president or vice president based on reports submitted by candidates to the Corruption Eradication Commission.

Like Megawati and Hasyim, Amien and Siswono were also not expected to attract many non-Javanese voters. The pair was supported by the PKS, the seventh party which met the criteria to submit presidential and vice-presidential candidates but did not do so, and a number of smaller parties.

=== Susilo Bambang Yudhoyono and Jusuf Kalla ===
Vote share of Susilo Bambang Yudhoyono and Jusuf Kalla in the first round in each city and regency

4
2004 Democratic Party ticket
Susilo Bambang Yudhoyono	Jusuf Kalla	Political party
for President	for Vice President	Political party
		Demokrat PBB PKPI
Coordinating Minister for Political and Security Affairs (2001–2004)	Coordinating Minister for Public Welfare (2001–2004)	Demokrat PBB PKPI

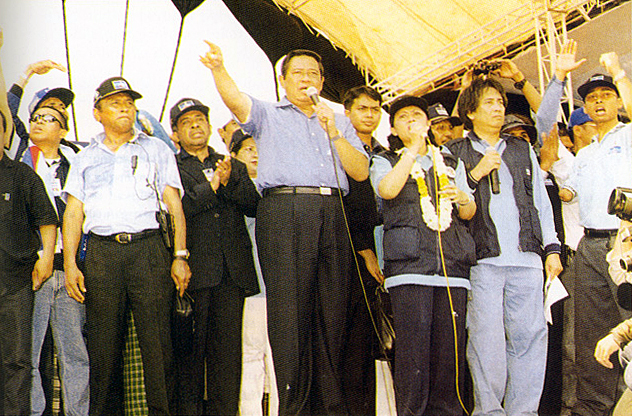
The rapid rise in Susilo Bambang Yudhoyono's (center) popularity helped the Democratic Party garner 7.45% of votes during the April 2004 legislative election.

The Democratic Party, supported by PKPI and PBB, nominated retired General Susilo Bambang Yudhoyono for its presidential candidate. He was later joined by Jusuf Kalla as running mate, and the pair was assigned the number 4 for its ballot.

Susilo Bambang Yudhoyono served in the cabinets of two previous administrations. While serving as Coordinating Minister for Political, Social and Security Affairs under Abdurrahman Wahid, he refused an order to declare a state of emergency that would have stopped the parliamentary process to impeach the President and was subsequently dismissed. Yudhoyono was nominated for vice president after the MPR selected Megawati to succeed Abdurrahman Wahid, but he lost the election to PPP Chairman Hamzah Haz and DPR Speaker Akbar Tanjung. He reprised his prior cabinet position in Megawati's administration but resigned on 1 March 2004 to join the race for the presidency. The Democratic Party, established as a vehicle for Yudhoyono's political career by secular nationalists who saw the potential of his leadership, received 7.45% of votes and 10% of DPR seats in the April legislative election.

Yudhoyono's running mate was Jusuf Kalla, a wealthy Bugis businessman and member of Golkar who served as Coordinating Minister for People's Welfare under Megawati. He mediated two separate peaceful resolutions to inter-religious conflicts between Christians and Muslims in his native Sulawesi in 2001 and Maluku in 2002. Kalla joined Golkar's selection process for the party's presidential nominee in August 2003 but withdrew his candidacy days before the party convention the following April. Several days later, he resigned his cabinet position and announced his alliance with Yudhoyono. Kalla was also seen as a potential vice-presidential candidate for the incumbent Megawati.

The combination brought together two men with very different backgrounds that added to the attractiveness of their ticket. Yudhoyono, who was raised in densely populated Java, is seen as more secular and has a military background. On the other hand, Kalla is a devout Muslim who grew up in the outer province of South Sulawesi and came from a civilian background.

=== Hamzah Haz and Agum Gumelar ===
Vote share of Hamzah Haz and Agum Gumelar in the first round in each city and regency

5
2004 United Development Party ticket
Hamzah Haz	Agum Gumelar	Political party
for President	for Vice President	Political party
		PPP
9th Vice President of Indonesia (2001–2004)	Minister of Transportation (2001–2004)	PPP

Incumbent Vice President Hamzah Haz was the presidential nominee of the PPP. He was joined by Minister of Transportation Agum Gumelar for the vice-presidential candidate. The pair was assigned the number 5 for its ballot.

Hamzah Haz was elected vice president by the MPR after defeating DPR Speaker Akbar Tanjung when it removed President Abdurrahman Wahid from office in 2001. Although the BBC reported him once stating that "no woman was fit to head the world's leading Muslim nation", he came into office as the deputy to Indonesia's first female president. Haz served in the cabinet of President B. J. Habibie and was the first minister to resign from the Abdurrahman Wahid administration. He was accused of graft and nepotism but was never subjected to an investigation. As Vice President, Haz had been a proponent of an amendment to the Constitution which would impose Islamic law on Muslims in the country. However, other political parties and the Islamic organisations Nahdlatul Ulama and Muhammadiyah opposed such amendment for fear of more extreme forms of Islam.

A relatively unknown figure in the political scene, Agum Gumelar served as Minister of Transportation under Abdurrahman Wahid and Megawati. In September 2003, Agum had recommended Susilo Bambang Yudhoyono or Jusuf Kalla as Megawati's running mate in the presidential election after predicting that the PDI–P would lose a significant number of votes in the April legislative election. However, both men eventually formed their own ticket, and Agum declined a vice-presidential candidate offer from Amien Rais in order to remain on the cabinet. He eventually accepted an offer from the PPP leadership to become Haz's running mate and resigned from Megawati's administration.

Neither candidate was of Javanese origin; hence, they might have attracted constituencies of the outer provinces.

== Campaign ==
Corruption, collusion, and nepotism are the most consistently cited concerns among voters surveyed by the National Democratic Institute for International Affairs.

=== Schedule ===
- 1 June 2004: All candidates sign the commitment of readiness to accept victory or defeat and to conduct a fair campaign. Campaign period begins.
- 1 July 2004: Campaign period ends.
- 5 July 2004: First round of voting.
- 20 September 2004: Second round of voting.
- 4 October 2004: Official second round results announced.
- 20 October 2004: Inauguration of the president-elect and vice president-elect.

== Results ==
Former security minister Susilo Bambang Yudhoyono won the first round with 33% of the vote. Incumbent President Megawati Sukarnoputri was second with 26%, ahead of former armed forces chief Wiranto on 22%. Yudhoyono did not do as well as earlier opinion polls had suggested, while Megawati did better. This was attributed by Indonesian observers to Yudhoyono's lack of a nationwide party machine, such as Megawati's PDI-P and Wiranto's Golkar.

The counting of 113 million votes, already a massive task in such a large and diverse country, was made more difficult by problems with the ballot papers. Voters cast their ballots by making a hole in the ballot paper with a nail, above the photo of their preferred candidate. Because the ballot paper was handed to voters folded in half, many made the hole without unfolding the ballot, thus making two holes and invalidating their vote. Hundreds of thousands of these votes were invalidated before the General Election Committee (KPU) ruled that such ballots should be accepted. This necessitated recounts in many places, slowing the count and raising fears of a disputed result.

Candidate	Running mate	Party	First round		Second round	
Candidate	Running mate	Party	Votes	%	Votes	%
Susilo Bambang Yudhoyono	Jusuf Kalla	Democratic Party	39,838,184	33.57	69,266,350	60.62
Megawati Sukarnoputri	Hasyim Muzadi	Indonesian Democratic Party of Struggle	31,569,104	26.61	44,990,704	39.38
Wiranto	Salahuddin Wahid	Golkar	26,286,788	22.15		
Amien Rais	Siswono Yudo Husodo	National Mandate Party	17,392,931	14.66		
Hamzah Haz	Agum Gumelar	United Development Party	3,569,861	3.01		
Total			118,656,868	100.00	114,257,054	100.00
Valid votes			118,656,868	97.83	114,257,054	97.94
Invalid/blank votes			2,636,976	2.17	2,405,646	2.06
Total votes			121,293,844	100.00	116,662,700	100.00
Registered voters/turnout			155,048,803	78.23	155,048,803	75.24
Source: IFES, IFES

=== First round ===
Results of the first round: candidate with the most votes in each province.

Results of the first round: candidate with the most votes in each city and regency.

Province	Yudhoyono		Megawati		Wiranto		Amien		Hamzah	
Province	Votes	%	Votes	%	Votes	%	Votes	%	Votes	%
Aceh	519,197	24.39	120,226	5.65	204,534	9.61	1,195,823	56.18	88,836	4.17
North Sumatra	1,523,612	27.23	2,233,777	39.92	934,213	16.69	798,790	14.27	105,687	1.89
West Sumatra	518,648	25.30	121,254	5.92	610,847	29.80	741,811	36.19	57,228	2.79
Riau	677,761	32.52	460,328	22.09	504,017	24.19	397,761	19.09	44,092	2.12
Jambi	520,145	38.73	273,925	20.39	364,651	27.15	155,974	11.61	28,437	2.12
South Sumatra	1,241,095	36.49	1,127,608	33.15	640,294	18.82	341,716	10.05	50,644	1.49
Bengkulu	196,057	26.51	155,657	21.04	253,986	34.34	121,483	16.42	12,480	1.69
Lampung	1,430,729	39.45	896,581	24.72	881,715	24.31	359,285	9.91	58,297	1.61
Bangka Belitung Islands	165,657	33.26	179,777	36.09	82,250	16.51	58,759	11.80	11,656	2.34
Riau Islands	224,334	37.56	153,138	25.64	81,816	13.70	128,551	21.52	9,437	1.58
Jakarta	1,988,306	38.23	1,172,891	22.66	499,455	9.97	1,415,582	26.64	121,924	2.50
West Java	7,100,175	32.41	5,095,705	23.26	5,341,526	24.38	3,562,173	16.26	810,519	3.70
Central Java	5,276,432	28.90	5,807,127	31.81	3,943,032	21.60	2,409,138	13.20	820,273	4.49
Yogyakarta	576,012	28.05	557,133	27.13	334,067	16.27	558,068	27.18	28,293	1.38
East Java	7,458,399	35.63	5,896,278	28.17	5,076,454	24.25	1,902,254	9.09	599,806	2.87
Banten	1,706,548	35.61	1,193,414	24.90	922,299	19.25	796,758	16.63	172,971	3.61
Bali	654,127	32.08	1,115,788	54.72	210,784	10.34	48,472	2.38	9,791	0.48
West Nusa Tenggara	715,838	33.03	223,204	10.30	723,484	33.39	436,073	20.12	68,382	3.16
East Nusa Tenggara	312,777	14.50	1,344,116	62.32	432,823	20.07	58,341	2.70	8,757	0.41
West Kalimantan	477,724	23.73	821,577	40.81	415,492	20.64	185,097	9.19	113,244	5.63
Central Kalimantan	303,123	34.37	296,335	33.60	170,193	19.29	88,439	10.03	23,976	2.72
South Kalimantan	600,156	37.30	211,881	13.17	353,732	21.98	339,993	21.13	103,429	6.43
East Kalimantan	558,900	39.08	337,458	23.60	246,715	17.25	255,665	17.88	31,459	2.20
North Sulawesi	355,436	28.28	389,135	30.96	451,663	35.93	47,309	3.76	13,380	1.06
Central Sulawesi	539,624	43.71	119,917	9.71	455,167	36.87	101,877	8.25	17,865	1.45
South Sulawesi	2,854,774	64.17	381,385	8.57	678,445	15.25	476,483	10.71	57,728	1.30
Southeast Sulawesi	398,544	41.72	108,905	11.40	361,386	37.83	74,496	7.80	11,907	1.25
Gorontalo	31,210	5.94	39,647	7.55	402,162	76.57	39,569	7.53	12,624	2.40
Maluku	100,748	14.24	269,611	38.10	288,091	40.71	40,392	5.71	8,887	1.26
North Maluku	102,353	22.07	98,459	21.23	181,373	39.10	75,404	16.26	6,272	1.35
West Irian Jaya	148,675	47.80	102,191	32.85	38,425	12.35	18,221	5.86	3,538	1.14
Papua	465,424	46.75	202,295	20.32	157,702	15.84	126,429	12.70	43,776	4.40
Overseas	95,644	37.80	62,381	24.65	43,995	17.39	36,745	14.52	14,266	5.64
Total	39,838,184	33.57	31,569,104	26.61	26,286,788	22.15	17,392,931	14.66	3,569,861	3.01
Source: Statistics Indonesia; Ananda, Arifin & Suryadinata

Wiranto refused to accept the election results and petitioned the Constitutional Court. Wiranto and Salahuddin argued that, due to irregularities in ballot counting by the KPU, they had lost 5,434,660 votes from twenty-six provinces. Those ballots would have made the total popular vote for the pair higher than that for Megawati and Hasyim, putting the former pair instead of the latter in the second round. However, the Court ruled on 10 August that it found no irregularities and upheld the commission's final count.

=== Second round ===
Results of the second round: candidate with the most votes in each province.

Results of the second round: candidate with the most votes in each city and regency.

Province	Yudhoyono		Megawati	
Province	Votes	%	Votes	%
Aceh	1,561,156	77.10	463,769	22.90
North Sumatra	2,808,212	52.61	2,530,065	47.39
West Sumatra	1,585,796	83.77	307,196	16.23
South Sumatra	1,719,016	50.99	1,652,302	49.01
Riau	1,309,245	65.79	680,707	34.21
Bengkulu	444,156	61.71	275,632	38.29
Lampung	2,165,778	60.61	1,407,236	39.39
Bangka Belitung Islands	233,454	51.29	221,715	48.71
Riau Islands	367,374	65.33	194,933	34.67
Jambi	917,952	69.52	402,542	30.48
Jakarta	3,392,663	69.21	1,509,402	30.79
West Java	13,186,776	62.76	7,825,251	37.24
Central Java	8,991,744	51.67	8,409,066	48.33
Yogyakarta	1,151,043	59.69	777,467	40.31
East Java	12,150,901	59.65	8,217,996	40.35
Banten	2,913,659	62.76	1,728,732	37.24
Bali	755,432	37.73	1,246,521	62.27
West Nusa Tenggara	1,563,494	74.96	522,411	25.04
East Nusa Tenggara	590,459	28.07	1,513,088	71.93
West Kalimantan	962,365	49.98	963,065	50.02
Central Kalimantan	474,839	55.90	374,546	44.10
South Kalimantan	1,096,637	73.30	399,528	26.70
East Kalimantan	856,365	63.97	482,247	36.03
North Sulawesi	686,688	56.72	523,903	43.28
Central Sulawesi	933,261	77.96	263,813	22.04
South Sulawesi	3,869,361	87.24	565,953	12.76
Southeast Sulawesi	721,792	78.07	202,705	21.93
Gorontalo	276,402	57.99	200,230	42.01
Maluku	311,269	45.39	374,437	54.61
North Maluku	277,077	61.84	170,975	38.16
Papua	642,869	62.84	380,091	37.16
West Irian Jaya	182,481	59.39	124,760	40.61
Overseas	166,634	67.98	78,500	32.02
Total	69,266,350	60.62	44,990,704	39.38
Source: Ananda, Arifin & Suryadinata; Statistics Indonesia

== Reactions ==
- Indonesia: President Megawati Sukarnoputri said in a speech on Armed Forces Day, 5 October, "We have to show to the world we are a big nation. All components of the nation have to stick to the agreement we have struck that whoever is elected in the democratic election has to be accepted. We may have chosen differently. However, we had the same objective: that is to bring the nation to a better future."
- Australia: Prime Minister John Howard said he planned to attend Yudhoyono's inauguration. Howard said, "I look forward to working closely with Dr. Yudhoyono and his new government to continue and extend the close cooperation between our two nations, particularly on counter-terrorism."
- People's Republic of China: Politburo Standing Committee member Wu Guanzheng met with Yudhoyono on 13 October and conveyed congratulations from President Hu Jintao.

== Aftermath ==
Susilo Bambang Yudhoyono and Jusuf Kalla were sworn in as president and vice president on 20 October. It was the first Indonesian presidential inauguration to be attended by foreign leaders. After a selection process that began on 15 October, the United Indonesia Cabinet was announced later following the inauguration. The 36-member cabinet was sworn in at the State Palace on 21 October. The process of selecting candidates for Yudhoyono's cabinet was considered "decent, intelligent, and indecisive". While attempting to satisfy as many members as possible in his coalition of small parties, Yudhoyono created a cabinet that was neither quite as cohesive nor effective. However, Kalla soon became the party chairman of Golkar in late 2004 and turned the party's votes in the DPR to those in favour of the government, creating an effective bloc and leaving Megawati's PDI–P as the largest non-government party in the DPR. Although the first one hundred days of Yudhoyono's administration saw continuing economic stability, it was overshadowed by the events of the Indian Ocean earthquake which occurred on 26 December. The earthquake triggered tsunamis that destroyed the coastline of the provinces of Aceh and North Sumatra and killed more than 200,000 people.

== See also ==
- Elections in Indonesia
- 2004 Indonesian legislative election
- Two-round system
