= Siswono Yudo Husodo =

Indonesian politician (born 1943)

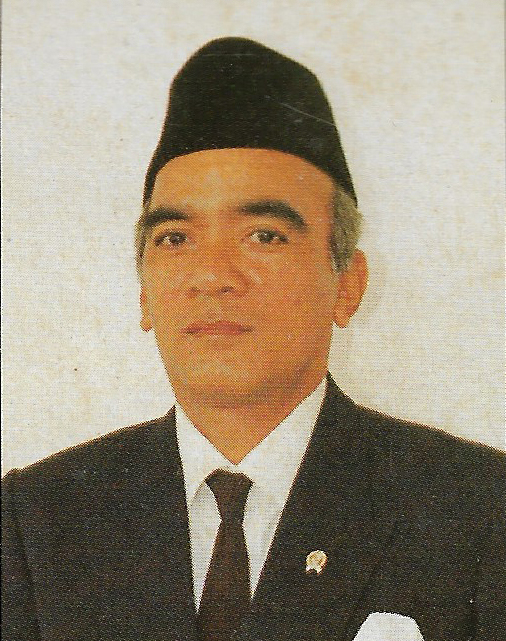
- Official portrait, 1993

9th Minister of Transmigration and Forest Settlement
- In office 17 March 1993 – 14 March 1998
- Preceded by: Soegiarto
- Succeeded by: A. M. Hendropriyono

2nd Minister of Public Housing
- In office 23 March 1988 – 17 March 1993
- Preceded by: Cosmas Batubara
- Succeeded by: Akbar Tanjung

Member of the People's Representative Council
- In office 1 October 2009 – 1 October 2014
- Constituency: Central Java I

Member of the People's Consultative Assembly
- In office 1 October 1999 – 1 October 2004

Personal details
- Born: 4 July 1943 (age 83) West Kutai, East Kalimantan, Japanese East Indies
- Party: Golkar (until 1999); Nasdem (since 2011)
- Education: Bandung Institute of Technology

Siswono Yudo Husodo (born 4 July 1943) is an Indonesian politician and businessman who was the Minister of Transmigration and Minister of Public Housing during the New Order era. He was a vice presidential candidate in the 1999 presidential vote and the 2004 presidential election.

== Early life ==
Siswono was born in Long Iram in West Kutai Regency on 4 July 1943, during the Japanese occupation of Indonesia. He was of Javanese ancestry. The third child of ten, his father was a doctor who was assigned to Kalimantan. As a child, he followed his father's change of assignment, moving to Tenggarong and later Palu, where he attended kindergarten. By 1949, his family moved to Kendal where he attended elementary school. In 1958, he moved to Jakarta to attend high school, and by 1961 he enrolled at the Bandung Institute of Technology (ITB).

During his time studying at ITB, Siswono was part of GMNI (Gerakan Mahasiswa Nasional Indonesia, Indonesian National Students' Movement) and Barisan Soekarno - an organization that supported Sukarno, which was censured when Suharto took power. As a result, he was suspended from his studies for four years. During this time, he engaged in trading produce, namely selling garlic from East Java to Jakarta and Palembang. He was allowed to return to his studies in 1968.

== Career ==
After graduating, Siswono started a construction firm PT Bangun Cipta Sarana along with his friends from ITB in 1969. The firm benefited from a construction boom during the Suharto period and was given the contracts to build the graves of Sukarno and Hatta. Siswono eventually accepted an offer to become the Minister of Public Housing under Suharto's cabinet in 1988 and was reappointed as the Minister of Transmigration and Manpower in 1993.

Following the fall of Suharto, Siswono was the Chairman of the Indonesian Farmers Association, and he represented the "Business Group" in the People's Consultative Assembly between 1999 and 2004. He was considered a likely vice presidential candidate in the 1999 vote, but won the fewest votes out of the five candidates (31 out of 613) and was dropped in the first round of voting. During this time, he was a member of Golkar.

For the 2004 presidential election, Siswono became the running mate to Amien Rais. Six political parties supported them, but the pair was eliminated in the first round of voting after only winning 14.66 percent of votes, placing them fourth.

Later in the 2009 legislative election, Siswono was elected to the People's Representative Council representing Central Java's 1st electoral district still as a Golkar candidate. He was part of the body's fourth commission and was deputy chairman of its honor council. He did not run for reelection in 2014, citing his age.

By 2017, he had joined the NasDem Party and became the chairman of its advisory council until his resignation in 2022 citing age and health. He had also been the chairman of Pancasila University's foundation.
