= Amien Rais =

Indonesian politician (born 1944)

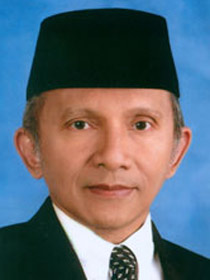
- Election portrait, 2004

Speaker of the People's Consultative Assembly
- In office 3 October 1999 – 30 September 2004
- Preceded by: Harmoko
- Succeeded by: Hidayat Nur Wahid

1st General Chairman of National Mandate Party
- In office 23 June 1998 – 9 April 2005
- Preceded by: Office established
- Succeeded by: Soetrisno Bachir

Chairman of Muhammadiyah
- In office 28 June 1995 – 26 April 1998
- Preceded by: Ahmad Azhar Basyir
- Succeeded by: Ahmad Syafi'i Maarif

Personal details
- Born: Muhammad Amien Rais; 26 April 1944 (age 82) Surakarta, Japanese East Indies
- Party: Ummat (since 2020)
- Other political affiliations: PAN (1998–2020)
- Spouse: Kusnasriyati Sri Rahayu
- Children: 5, including Hanum Salsabiela Rais
- Education: Gadjah Mada University; Sunan Kalijaga State Islamic University; University of Notre Dame; University of Chicago; George Washington University, University of California-Los Angeles

Muhammad Amien Rais (born 26 April 1944) is an Indonesian politician. He was one of the leaders of the reform movement that forced the resignation of President Suharto in 1998. Amien Rais was the leader of Muhammadiyah, one of the two biggest Muslim organizations in Indonesia, from 1995 to 2000. He was the Chairman of the People's Consultative Assembly (MPR) from 1999 to 2004. During his chairmanship, the MPR passed a series of amendments to the Constitution of Indonesia. These amendments, among other things, established direct presidential elections, a presidential term limit (two terms), and the Constitutional Court.

== Early life and education ==
Amien Rais was born in Surakarta, Central Java, as the second child of Suhud Rais and Sudalmiyah Rais. The couple were Muhammadiyah activists in Surakarta. His father, Suhud Rais, graduated from Muhammadiyah's Mualimin high school. He worked in Surakarta's religion affairs office. He also was a member of Muhammadiyah's Board of Education in the Surakarta chapter. His mother, Sudalmiyah, was born in 1912 and was an activist in Aisyiyah, a Muhammadiyah's women organization and had been its chairperson for 20 years. She graduated from Muhammadiyah's teaching school 'Hogere Indlansche Kweekschool'. She was a member of Masyumi party in the 1950s. She was awarded 'The Central Java Best Mother' in 1985 and died in 2001.

== Activism career ==
After his studies in the United States, he was a Middle East specialist and was noted for being a critic of US foreign policy. Controversially, Rais learned a lot about human rights and democracy in the US. Amien Rais' activities in Muhammadiyah began in 1985 when he led The Council of Preacher (Majelis Tabligh). Later in 1990, Rais was vice chairman elected in a convention (muktamar) in Yogyakarta. Amien Rais was also active in the newly established Indonesian Association of Muslim Intellectuals (ICMI), a Muslim scholars association. Rais led ICMI's Expert Council, but resigned in 1997 under pressure from Suharto because he argued on the Busang and the Freeport cases. In 1995, Rais replaced Azhar Basyir, then the chairman of Muhammadiyah, who died soon after his re-election. In 1993, at a Muhammadiyah mid-term meeting (Tanwir) in Surabaya, Rais urged a presidential succession, a very rare issue amid the New Order regime. The political and economical decay in Indonesia during the 90s had Rais call for a controversial issue: political reform. Amien Rais' calls were one of the many catalysts that led to the eventual downfall of the New Order regime. This made him enemy number one of the Suharto administration.

== Political career ==
=== Fall of Suharto ===
In 1998, Amien Rais became an outspoken critic, and allied himself with the reform movement. However, this would also force the New Order regime to ban any demonstration reflecting the people's voice regarding Reformasi. In May 1998, Jakarta was in chaos following rioting in some parts of the city. The army and the police forces were unable to handle the situation. Meanwhile, President Suharto embarked on a state visit to Cairo, Egypt. Upon his return from Cairo, Suharto learned that the situation was out of control. Several days later, he invited some prominent Muslim figures – including Abdurrahman Wahid, Emha Ainun Najib, Nurcholish Madjid and Malik Fajar – to discuss the nation's current condition. Suharto proposed to establish a Reform Committee, to reshuffle the cabinet ministers and to resign from the presidency within 6 months. This was not responded to by those who attended the meeting. Suharto panicked as 14 of his ministers resigned from the cabinet. On 20 May, Amien Rais cancelled the mass rally to Monas square as an army general threatened to make "another Tiananmen" should he do so. Less than 24 hours later, Suharto resigned from his office and was replaced by Vice President B.J. Habibie.

=== National Mandate Party ===
Amien Rais and other reformists established the National Mandate Party (Partai Amanat Nasional/PAN) on 6 August 1998. Amien Rais was elected its first chairman with Faisal Basri as secretary general. Therefore, his position in Muhammadiyah was replaced by vice chairman Ahmad Syafi'i Maarif. PAN gained 6 percent of the vote in the 1999 election but failed to nominate Rais as a presidential candidate. However, political compromise allowed Amien to lead the People Consultative Assembly (MPR). As a kingmaker, Amien Rais and other Islam parties and Golkar elected Abdurrahman Wahid as president and Megawati Sukarnoputri as vice president. Amien Rais was also a leading figure in the Indonesian constitution amendment process.

=== 2004 Presidential election ===
Amien Rais ran and lost in the 2004 presidential election. He and running mate Siswono Yudo Husodo were nominated by PAN, the Prosperous Justice Party (PKS) and some small political parties, and finished in the fourth place with 15% of the vote.

=== Ummah Party ===
On 1 October 2020, he formed a new party called Ummah Party (Indonesian: Partai Ummat), which he claimed to "work and fight with fellow countrymen against tyranny and injustice". Deputy chairman of PAN, Viva Yoga Mauladi, confirmed Amien's departure from the party. Before leaving PAN, he was involved in internal rift with fellow party politicians over support for Jokowi's administration. Ridho Rahmadi, Amien Rais' son-in-law, was appointed the party's inaugural chairman.

== Other activities ==
Amien Rais is currently the Chairman of PAN's Advisory Board, Muhammadiyah's Advisory Board, and is a professor at Gadjah Mada University. One of the founders of PAN, Abdillah Toha criticized him for his controversial statements and inconsistencies on many issues including his support on changing local elections to be indirect, and called him a "traitor of the Reform".

== Controversies ==
In a corruption scandal trial of a former health minister, Siti Fadilah Supari, Amien Rais was reported to have received funds related the case. He admitted that he had received the funds but then accused the Corruption Eradication Commission of being an incompetent organization.

== Published works ==
Year	Indonesian title	English translated title	Publisher
1977	Bilik-bilik pesantren: sebuah potret perjalanan	Rooms of the Pesantren: A Journey Portrait	Paramadina
1985	Islam, Kemodernan, dan Keindonesiaan	Islam, Modernity, and Indonesianness	Mizan
1992	Bilik-Bilik Pesantren	Rooms of the Pesantren	Paramadina

Political offices
Preceded by Harmoko	Chairman of Indonesian People's Consultative Assembly; 1999–2004	Succeeded by Hidayat Nur Wahid
Party political offices
Preceded by Position created	Chairman of National Mandate Party; 1999–2004	Succeeded by Sutrisno Bachir
Non-profit organization positions
Preceded by Azhar Basyir	Chairman of Muhammadiyah; 1995–1998	Succeeded by Ahmad Syafi'i Maarif
