= Barbados–Indonesia relations =

- Barbados: Indonesia

Diplomatic mission
- Embassy of Barbados, Beijing: Embassy of Indonesia, Bogotá

Envoy
- Ambassador Hallam Henry: Ambassador Tatang Budie Utama Razak

Diplomatic relations between Barbados and Indonesia were established on 26 June 2019 with the signing of a joint communique between Barbados and Indonesia's permanent representative to the United Nations. The two countries maintained cooperation in multilateral forums and agricultural technical training.

== Establishment of diplomatic relations ==
Diplomatic relations between Barbados and Indonesia has been proposed by Indonesia since 2011, with subsequent proposals in 2014 and 2017. However, the Government of Barbados did not respond to any of the proposals. In 2018, Indonesia's ambassador in Bogotá, Colombia, Priyo Iswanto, was assigned the task of approaching the government of Barbados to gain support for Indonesia's candidacy as a non-permanent member of the United Nations Security Council for 2019 to 2020. Priyo initially refused to undertake the duty due to the lack of experience in handling cooperation with Barbados and the absence of diplomatic relations. The task was subsequently returned to the permanent mission in New York, which handles multilateral issues, circumventing the need for a formal bilateral foundation.

During a diplomatic week event in Saint Kitts and Nevis, Priyo met with Marie Legault, Canada's high commissioner in Barbados. In a discussion with Legault, Priyo expressed Indonesia's concern that, despite three attempts, Barbados had not responded to the proposals for establishing diplomatic relations. Legault suggested that the previous government might have been unresponsive due to resource limitations but offered to speak directly to the then-prime minister Mia Mottley, who she described as more responsive. The very next day, Legault informed Priyo that she had received an email response from the prime minister, suggesting he contact the foreign minister Jerome Walcott and provided Walcott’s personal contact number.

Utilizing this information, Priyo engaged in what he described as "WhatsApp diplomacy", sending a message on 11 April 2019 to Minister Walcott's private number. He described his approach as undiplomatic but argued that it was necessary to further the Indonesian government objective. The message received an immediate, positive response from Walcott, who apologized for the "negligence" of the former administration and promised to follow up upon his return to Barbados. A week later, on 18 April 2019, Walcott confirmed via WhatsApp that the cabinet had approved the measure and that the process to open diplomatic relations would commence. Based on this successful communication, Priyo informed the foreign ministry and the permanent mission in New York.

Voice of America's report on the establishment of diplomatic relations between Barbados and Indonesia

Diplomatic relations were established with the signing of the joint communiqué on 26 June 2019 in New York by the Barbadian permanent representative Elizabeth Thompson and her Indonesian counterpart Dian Triansyah Djani. Indonesia accredited its ambassador in Bogotá to cover Barbados, while Barbados accredited its ambassador in Beijing to Indonesia. Both governments officially notified the United Nations of the opening of diplomatic relations on the same day the communiqué was signed.

== Cooperation ==
Following the establishment of formal ties, Indonesian citizens were granted visa-free entry into Barbados. During the COVID-19 pandemic, Barbados served as a critical hub for the repatriation of 1,647 Indonesian ship crew members stranded in Caribbean waters. Current cooperation mostly focuses on multilateral forums and technical agricultural training.
