= Masinton Pasaribu =

Indonesian politician (born 1971)

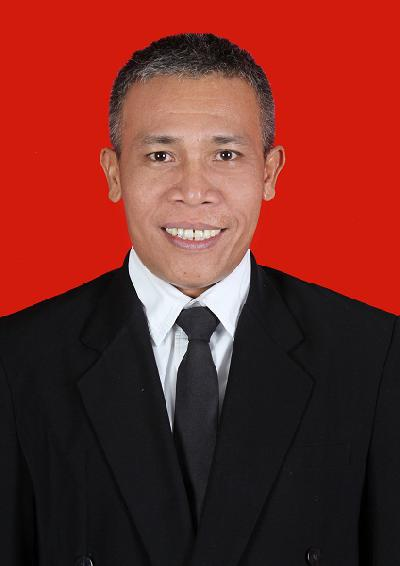

Regent of Central Tapanuli
- Incumbent
- Assumed office 20 February 2025
- Deputy: Mahmud Efendi Lubis
- Preceded by: Sugeng Riyanta

Member of People's Representative Council
- In office 1 October 2014 – 1 October 2024
- Constituency: Jakarta II

Personal details
- Born: 11 February 1971 (age 55) Sibolga, North Sumatra, Indonesia
- Party: PDI-P

Masinton Pasaribu (born 11 February 1971) is an Indonesian politician from PDI-P and former activist who served as a member of the House of Representatives from 2014 to 2024. He is currently the regent of Central Tapanuli, serving since February 2025.

== Early life ==
Pasaribu was born in the city of Sibolga, North Sumatra from a Batak background. After completing high school, he spent some time as a freelance laborer at the Port of Belawan before moving to Jakarta to study law, graduating in 2003. During his time as a student, he was active in organisations protesting the New Order and took part in the 1998 protests which eventually led to the fall of Suharto. After graduating, he was also part of labor activism.

== Political career ==
Pasaribu joined PDI-P, along with around 50 other activists, in 2004. There, he became one of the founders and served as chairman of REPDEM (Indonesian: Relawan Perjuangan Demokrasi, "Volunteers for Democratic Struggle"), which became one of PDI-P's wings.

In the 2014 Indonesian legislative election, Pasaribu ran for a seat in the People's Representative Council from Jakarta's 2nd electoral district and won after securing 30,989 votes. In the body, he became part of the Third Commission on Law and Human Rights. After being reelected in 2019, he failed to win a seat in the 2024 election. He then ran in the local elections that year to become regent of Central Tapanuli, winning with 87,095 votes (54%). He was sworn in on 20 February 2025. During his time as regent, the Ministry of Home Affairs assigned four small islands previously claimed by neighboring Aceh Singkil Regency to Central Tapanuli, flaring up a dispute.

He severely criticised then vice president Jusuf Kalla in 2015, accusing him of being the source of various government issues. During an investigation into the Corruption Eradication Commission (KPK), Pasaribu became the deputy chairman of the committee responsible for some time, until he was replaced. Pasaribu called #2019GantiPresiden movement a dishonest, political movement.
