= Jakarta II (electoral district) =

Electoral district in Indonesia

Jakarta Special Capital Region II
- Daerah Khusus Ibukota Jakarta II
- Constituency for the People's Representative Council
- Location of Central and South Jakarta (Numbered 1 and 3 on the map)
- Region: Central Jakarta, South Jakarta, overseas voters
- Population: 3,516,507 (2021)
- Electorate: 2,622,791

Current constituency
- Created: 2004; 22 years ago
- Seats: 9 (2004—09); 7 (2009—present)
- Members: Eriko Sotarduga (PDI-P); Masinton Pasaribu (PDI-P); Hidayat Nur Wahid (PKS); Kurniasih Mufidayati (PKS); Christina Aryani (Golkar); Melani Leimena Suharli (Demokrat); Himmatul Aliyah (Gerindra)
- Created from: DKI Jakarta

Jakarta Special Capital Region II (Indonesian: Daerah Khusus Ibukota Jakarta II), abbreviated as DKI Jakarta II or Jakarta II, is an electoral district in Indonesia which encompasses of Central and South Jakarta in the Jakarta Special Capital Region. The district also represents Indonesian constituents abroad. Since 2009, this district has been represented by seven members of the People's Representative Council (DPR RI).

== Components ==
- 2004–2009: West Jakarta and South Jakarta
- 2009–present: Redistricted into Central Jakarta, South Jakarta, and overseas electorates

== List of members ==
The following list is in alphabetical order. Party with the largest number of members is placed on top of the list.

Election	Member	Party
2004	Aan Rohanah	PKS
2004	Hidayat Nur Wahid	PKS
2004	Husein Abdul Aziz	Demokrat
2004	Indria Octavia Muaja	Demokrat
2004	A. Chudlory Syafei Hadzami	PPP
2004	Afni Achmad	PAN
2004	Constant M. Ponggawa	PDS
2004	Roy B.B. Janis	PDI-P
2004	Watty Amir	Golkar
2009	Melani Leimena Suharli	Demokrat
2009	Nova Riyanti Yusuf	Demokrat
2009	Nurcahyo Anggorojati	Demokrat
2009	Eriko Sotarduga	PDI-P
2009	Fayakhun Andriadi	Golkar
2009	Okky Asokawati	PPP
2009	Sohibul Iman	PKS
2014	Eriko Sotarduga	PDI-P
2014	Masinton Pasaribu	PDI-P
2014	Biem Triani Benjamin	Gerindra
2014	Fayakhun Andriadi	Golkar
2014	Hidayat Nur Wahid	PKS
2014	Melani Leimena Suharli	Demokrat
2014	Okky Asokawati (2014–18) (Note: Resigned from the party); Lena Maryana (2018–19)	PPP
2019	Eriko Sotarduga	PDI-P
2019	Masinton Pasaribu	PDI-P
2019	Hidayat Nur Wahid	PKS
2019	Kurniasih Mufidayati	PKS
2019	Christina Aryani	Golkar
2019	Himmatul Aliyah	Gerindra
2019	Melani Leimena Suharli	Demokrat

== See also ==
- List of Indonesian national electoral districts
