= Okky Asokawati =

Indonesian former model and politician

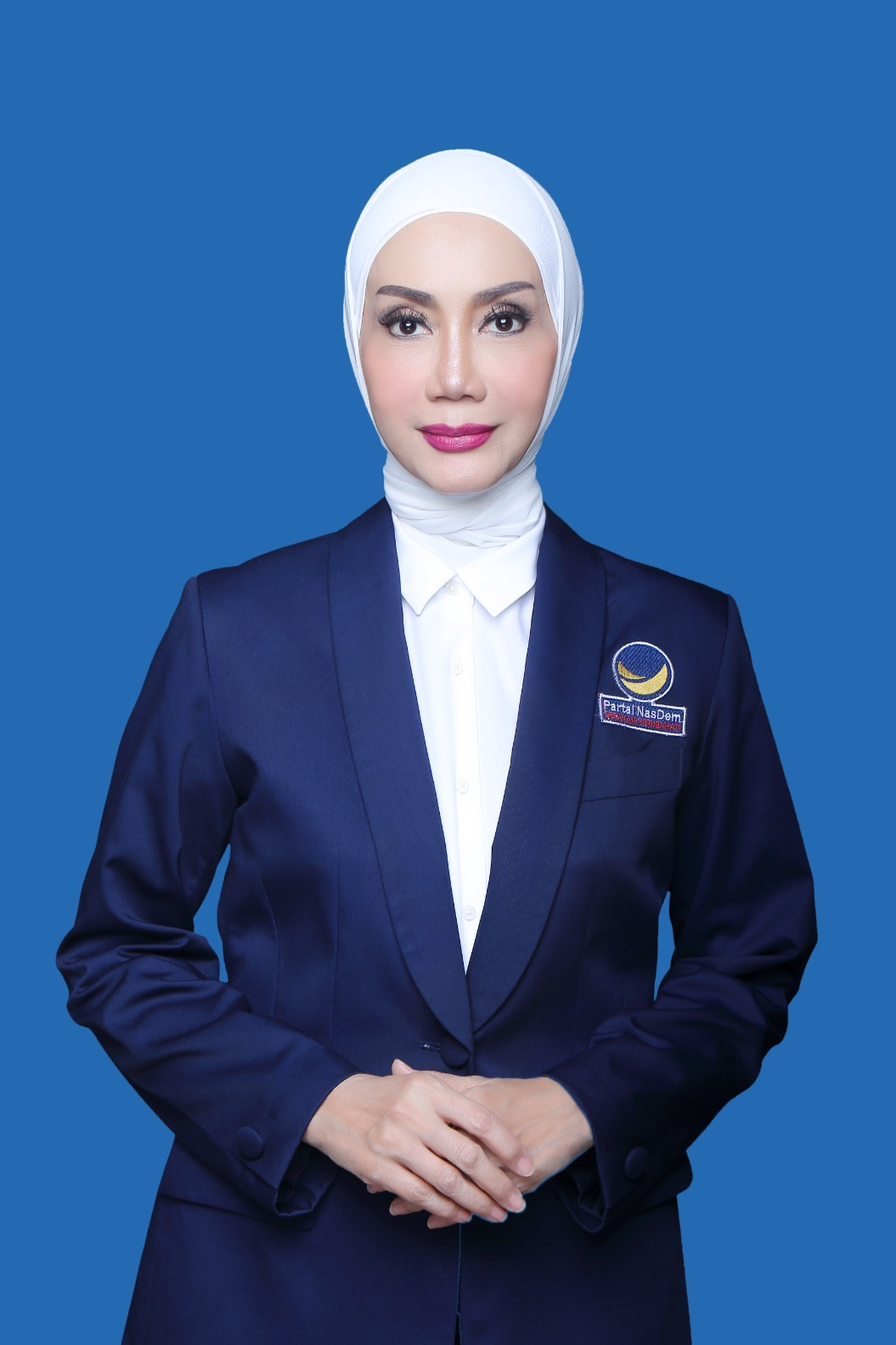

Member of People's Representative Council
- In office 1 October 2009 – 2 October 2018
- Succeeded by: Lena Maryana
- Constituency: Jakarta II

Personal details
- Born: March 6, 1961 (age 65) Jakarta, Indonesia
- Party: NasDem Party (2019-now)
- Other political affiliations: United Development Party (2009-2018)
- Spouses: Firman Ichsan (m. 1985; div. 2003) Fajar Tyas Sasono Padmodimulyo (died 2007)
- Children: Tanisa Diva Siti Murbarani and Queentadira Asokawati Padmodimuldjo
- Education: University of Indonesia (Bachelor)
- Occupation: Actress; Model; singer

Okky Asokawati (born 6 March 1961) is an Indonesian former model and politician.

== Early life ==
Asokawati was born on 6 March 1961. She was one of the six children of adjunct police commissioner Anwas Tanuamijaya who was sentenced for life imprisonment for his alleged complicity in the 30 September Movement. Her mother worked as an English teacher to support the family. Tanuamijaya was released in 1985. She holds a Master of Science in Psychology degree from the University of Indonesia.

== Career ==
When Asokawati was 17, she competed in a beauty contest organised by a magazine. Winning it led to her being signed as a photo-model. Soon, she established a name for herself and posed for Ungaro and Claude Montana's fashion houses. She started OQ Modeling school in 1988 and Persona finishing academy in 1990.

In 2003, she began writing her autobiography Jangan Menoleh ke Belakang and launched it two years later. From 2006 to 2008, she was a lecturer at the Pancasila University.

Asokawati is affiliated to the United Development Party (PPP). At the request of PPP chief Suryadarma Ali, she contested the 2009 Indonesian legislative election and was elected to the People's Representative Council from multi-member South Jakarta electoral district.

As a member of the People's Representative Council of Indonesia, she serves on its Commission IX, overseeing health and labour affairs. She was re-elected in 2014, polling 35,727 votes. In 2015, her biography From Fashion to Politics, authored by Threes Emir was published.

== Personal life ==
Asokawati married fashion photographer Firman Ichsan in 1985 from whom she has a daughter Tanisa Diva Siti Murbarani. They divorced in 2003. Later she was married to Fajar Tyas Sasono Padmodimulyo. Together they had a daughter Queentadira Asokawati. In 2007, Padmodimulyo died of a stroke.
