= Nazaruddin Dek Gam =

Indonesian politician (born 1979)

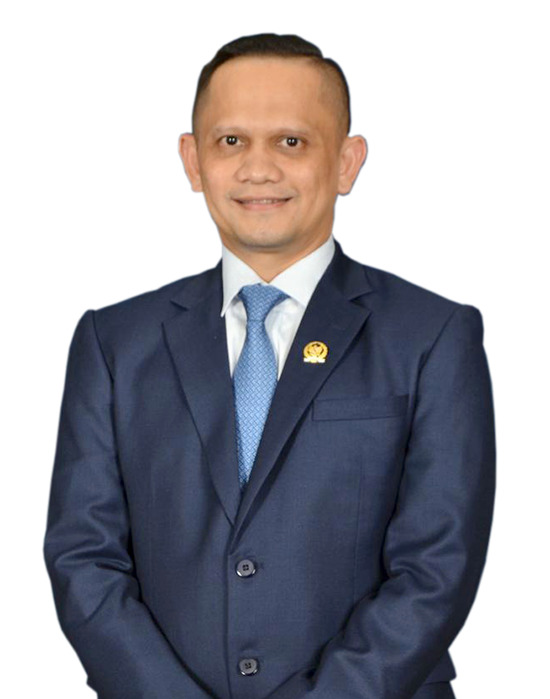

Member of House of Representatives
- Incumbent
- Assumed office 1 October 2019
- Constituency: Aceh I
- Majority: 93,353 (2019); 140,614 (2024)

Personal details
- Born: 20 May 1979 (age 46); Leupung, Aceh, Indonesia
- Political party: National Mandate Party

Nazaruddin Dek Gam (born 20 May 1979) is an Indonesian politician of the National Mandate Party and businessman who has been a member of the House of Representatives since 2019, representing Aceh's 1st electoral district. He has also been president of the Persiraja Banda Aceh football club since 2017.

== Early life ==
Nazaruddin Dek Gam was born on 20 May 1979 in the town of Leupung, in Aceh Besar Regency. He studied in Aceh, completing high school at a public high school in the provincial capital of Banda Aceh in 1998. His father was Muhammad Ali Mahmud, also known as his company name "Sinar Desa".

== Career ==
Nazaruddin went into business, becoming president director of PT Putra Sinar Desa in 2004. His businesses included hotels, a laundry center, a sports center, a car showroom, and an ice factory. In 2017, Banda Aceh's Persiraja football club was seeking a buyer for the club, its management contacting ten of the richest businessmen in Aceh. After they all declined to buy the club, Nazaruddin's name came up due to him being the son-in-law of then-mayor of Banda Aceh Aminullah Usman. Nazaruddin agreed to acquire an 80 percent interest in the club, becoming its president.

In the 2019 legislative election, Nazaruddin ran for a seat in the House of Representatives representing Aceh's 1st electoral district as a National Mandate Party (PAN) candidate. He won 93,353 votes and secured a seat. He was reelected in the 2024 election from the same district with 140,614 votes. In both terms, he was appointed a member of the legislature's Third Commission. In his second term, he was also appointed as chair of the legislature's parliamentary ethics council, having been deputy chair in his first term.

As a legislator, Nazaruddin in 2025 voiced his support for Aceh in a boundary dispute with neighboring North Sumatra over several small islands, which was assigned by Minister of Home Affairs Tito Karnavian to North Sumatra in April 2025.

In April 2025, he was selected as a deputy chairman of PAN, and was further appointed as head of the party's Aceh branch in May 2025.

== Personal life ==
He is married to Rina Mayasari, daughter of Banda Aceh's mayor Aminullah Usman. He had also chaired the Aceh provincial branches of the Indonesian Hockey Association and the Indonesian Karate Sports Federation.
