= Aceh–North Sumatra islands dispute =

Land dispute in Indonesia

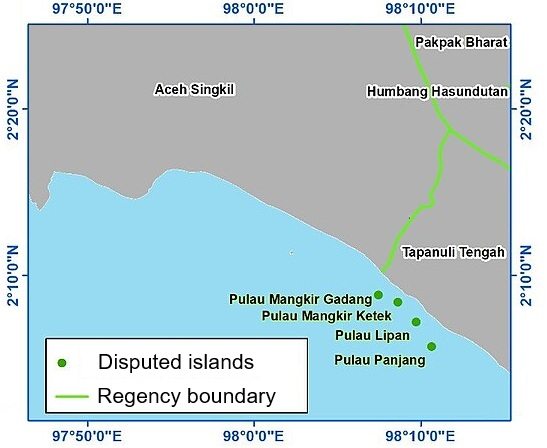
Locations of the disputed islands.

Four small islands were disputed between the Indonesian provinces of Aceh and North Sumatra. The islands are located near Aceh's Aceh Singkil Regency and North Sumatra's Central Tapanuli Regency, with a total area of less than 1 square kilometer and no permanent inhabitants. They were initially assigned to Aceh when it was separated as a province from North Sumatra in 1956. However, the islands were assigned to North Sumatra in 2008 due to a reporting error from the Acehnese government. The controversy flared up in 2025, following a Ministry of Home Affairs regulation which positioned the island in North Sumatra, and was resolved in mid-June when President Prabowo Subianto made a decision to return the islands to Aceh and the regulation was revised.

== The islands ==
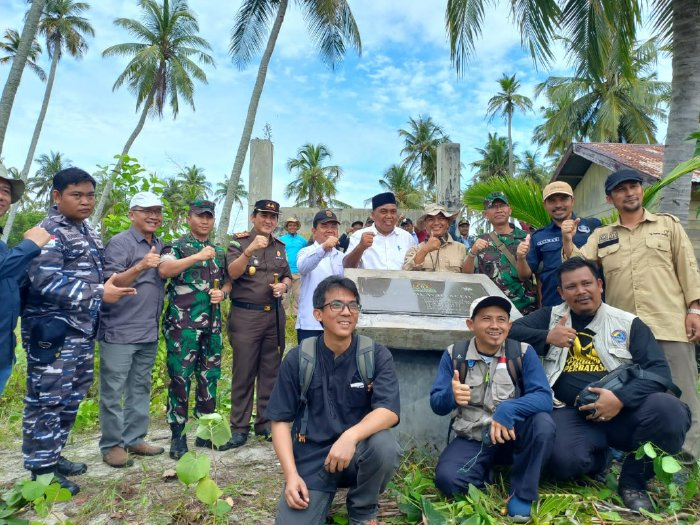
A Ministry of Home Affairs survey team on Panjang Island, 2022.

Covered by the dispute are four small islands: Mangkir Gadang (2°8′49″N 98°7′29″E), Mangkir Ketek (2°8′23″N 98°8′39″E), Lipan (2°7′12″N 98°9′45″E), and Panjang (2°5′43″N 98°10′40″E). Panjang is the largest of the islands, measuring around 47.8 hectares in area. Mangkir Gadang and Mangkir Ketek had an area of just over 8 and 6 hectares, while Lipan was a vanishing island (although as recently as 2007, it was a permanent island with vegetation). They are located immediately off the coast of Central Tapanuli Regency of North Sumatra, with their distance ranging from 1.2 to 2.4 km from mainland Central Tapanuli. In comparison, Panjang was located 30 km away from the mainland of Aceh Singkil.

The islands have no permanent inhabitants, but are frequently used by both Acehnese and Tapanuli fishermen as refuges during storms and as fishing grounds. According to a Ministry of Home Affairs visit to the island, the Mangkirs had boundary markers erected by Aceh's provincial government, while Panjang contained a musalla, a resting house, and a jetty in addition to the marker. Panjang in particular is covered in coconut groves and mangrove forests, with an old grave which indicate signs of frequent visits. The Ministry of Energy and Mineral Resources assessed the waters around the region as possessing a "rather large" potential for oil and gas development. Jurisdiction over the island would also include their associated exclusive economic zone, and thus partial rights to oil, gas, and fishery resources. Aceh's governor Muzakir Manaf claimed that the oil and gas potential in the islands is equivalent to those in the Andaman Islands.

== History ==
During the colonial period, Acehnese fishermen operated far into the modern boundary of North Sumatra, reaching up to Sibolga. The present-day province of Aceh was established in 1956, when it was reformed after briefly being merged with North Sumatra. The boundary between the two provinces was set by a map created on 1 July 1956. In 1965, the Aceh government reportedly granted land ownership to the islands to Acehnese resident Teuku Raja Udah. The governors of Aceh and North Sumatra in 1992, Ibrahim Hasan and Raja Inal Siregar, signed an agreement delineating the border between Singkil and Tapanuli, which included the four islands as part of Singkil.

After the end of the Aceh conflict in 2005, the Indonesian Government and the Free Aceh Movement agreed to use the 1956 map as the basis for the boundary between Aceh and North Sumatra. However, no copies of the 1956 map survived. After both provinces claimed the islands in 2007, a team from the Ministry of Home Affairs was sent to the region in 2008 to standardize the names of geographical features. The team catalogued 260 islands within Aceh and 213 in North Sumatra. However, the Acehnese government misreported the coordinates of the four islands, and the ministry classified the four disputed islands as part of North Sumatra.

In the ensuing years, Acehnese politicians including governor Nova Iriansyah sent letters and made requests to the ministry to re-include the island within Aceh, to no avail. The ministry further issued a regulation in 2020 which set the boundary between Singkil and Central Tapanuli, again placing the islands within North Sumatra. In 2022, a meeting was hosted by the ministry between the two provincial governments to mediate the issue. A physical survey was also dispatched to visit the islands in May 2022. Speaker of the Aceh House of Representatives, Saiful Bahri, voiced his concern in 2022 that the boundary dispute may lead to conflict between Acehnese and North Sumatran fishermen.

== 2025 flareup and resolution ==
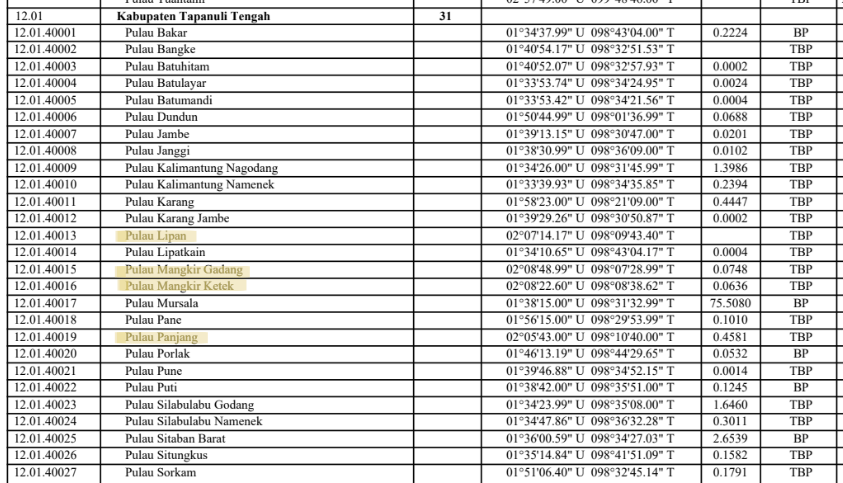
The disputed islands (highlighted in yellow) in the list of islands part of Central Tapanuli in the 2025 regulation.

On 25 April 2025, the Ministry of Home Affairs published a new regulation on codes for administrative areas, which explicitly classified the islands as part of Central Tapanuli. The Acehnese provincial government protested this, and on 4 June 2025 Aceh's governor Muzakir Manaf met with his North Sumatran counterpart Bobby Nasution (accompanied by Central Tapanuli regent Masinton Pasaribu) to discuss the issue. According to Nasution, Muzakir left the meeting before it concluded. Nasution posted pictures from the meeting to his Instagram account, which was then flooded by angry comments from Acehnese users accusing him of "stealing" Acehnese territory.

On 4 June 2025, a protest was held at Panjang island by several hundred Singkil residents opposing the islands' administration by North Sumatra. Acehnese students in Jakarta also held a protest in front of the Ministry of Home Affairs' Jakarta office on 13 June.

According to Deputy Chairman of the House of Representatives, Sufmi Dasco Ahmad, President of Indonesia Prabowo Subianto would be making a decision regarding the dispute. Sufmi Dasco Ahmad stated that Prabowo's decision to settle the dispute directly is to avoid any potential of instability. On 17 June, it was announced that the islands will be returned to Aceh. Nasution and Muzakir signed a revised border agreement the following day which included the islands in Aceh.

=== Reactions ===
Several Acehnese politicians at the national level expressed their support for Aceh's position in the dispute, such as DPR members Nazaruddin Dek Gam, Nasir Djamil, and Ruslan Daud, along with senator Azhari Cage. On the evening of 13 June, Aceh governor Muzakir Manaf held a closed-door meeting with Aceh's 17 DPR members and 4 senators to discuss the Acehnese position in the dispute. Safriadi Oyon, regent of Aceh Singkil, publicly rejected the ministry's decision. After Prabowo's decision, Muzakir Manaf expressed his gratitude to the president and hoped that relations between the two provinces continue smoothly and promised to utilize all the potential resources for the benefit of Aceh.

North Sumatra governor Nasution stated that the authority to resolve the dispute rests in the central government, and denied having pushed to have the island assigned to the province. He also rejected accusations that he received the islands as a "gift". Central Tapanuli regent Pasaribu initially welcomed the April decision by the ministry. Minister of Home Affairs Tito Karnavian stated that he "would not mind" if the Acehnese government filed a lawsuit over the dispute, noting that it was a long-standing complicated affair. Tito also announced that a review of the decision will be held. After the decision was made, Bobby Nasution urged North Sumatrans to accept the president's decision and avoid any provocation, while Pasaribu expressed his thanks to the president for making the matter clear for everyone involved. During the press conference in which Manaf and Nasution were in attendance, Tito showed the original copy of the agreement made back in 1992 as approved by then Minister of Home Affairs Rudini and stated that the achieves team of the Ministry had conducted an intensive search for the original document and the original document solidify Aceh's claims of the four disputed islands, which led to the final settlement in Aceh's favour.

Political analysts speculated that the dispute may have been suspiciously engineered by the Solo Gang to forward the interest of the political will of former president Joko Widodo, considering that incumbent governor of North Sumatra Nasution is his son-in-law and Minister of Home Affairs Tito Karnavian is deemed as one of Jokowi's loyalist. Rocky Gerung, Jokowi's fiercest critic, state that the dispute is "not mistakenly" orchestrated by the Jokowi's political dynasty and stated there is a conflict of interest present in Bobby, while PDI-P member of parliament Rieke Diah Pitaloka viewed that Tito violated the Helsinki MoU. Deputy Minister of Home Affairs Bima Arya Sugiarto reacted to the rumors, stating that "there is no interest whatsoever other than conducting the state's function to decide the borders according to available laws and procedures", while supporters of Jokowi states that the rumors are a part of slanderous efforts to delegitimize Jokowi's presidency.

Former Vice President of Indonesia Jusuf Kalla stated that the 2005 peace agreement should be respected, and noted that the dispute for Aceh was a matter of dignity and a matter of trust for the central government. Reacting to Nasution's offer to Manaf on joint development, Kalla stated that "All I know is that there is no island that wanted to be developed jointly". After the decision was made to return the islands back to Aceh, Kalla commented that the dispute serves as a reflection for the government not to take decisions rashly without learning the historical facts and laws pertaining to territorial ownership.

After the settlement, Minister of State Secretariat as Presidential Spokesperson Prasetyo Hadi said that achieves that contains territorial information will have to be tidy up to prevent more territorial disputes among provinces. He also said that other provinces also has similar disputes similar to this while stating that the dispute is a good moment to patch up their mistakes.
