= Eriko Sotarduga =

Indonesian politician (born 1969)

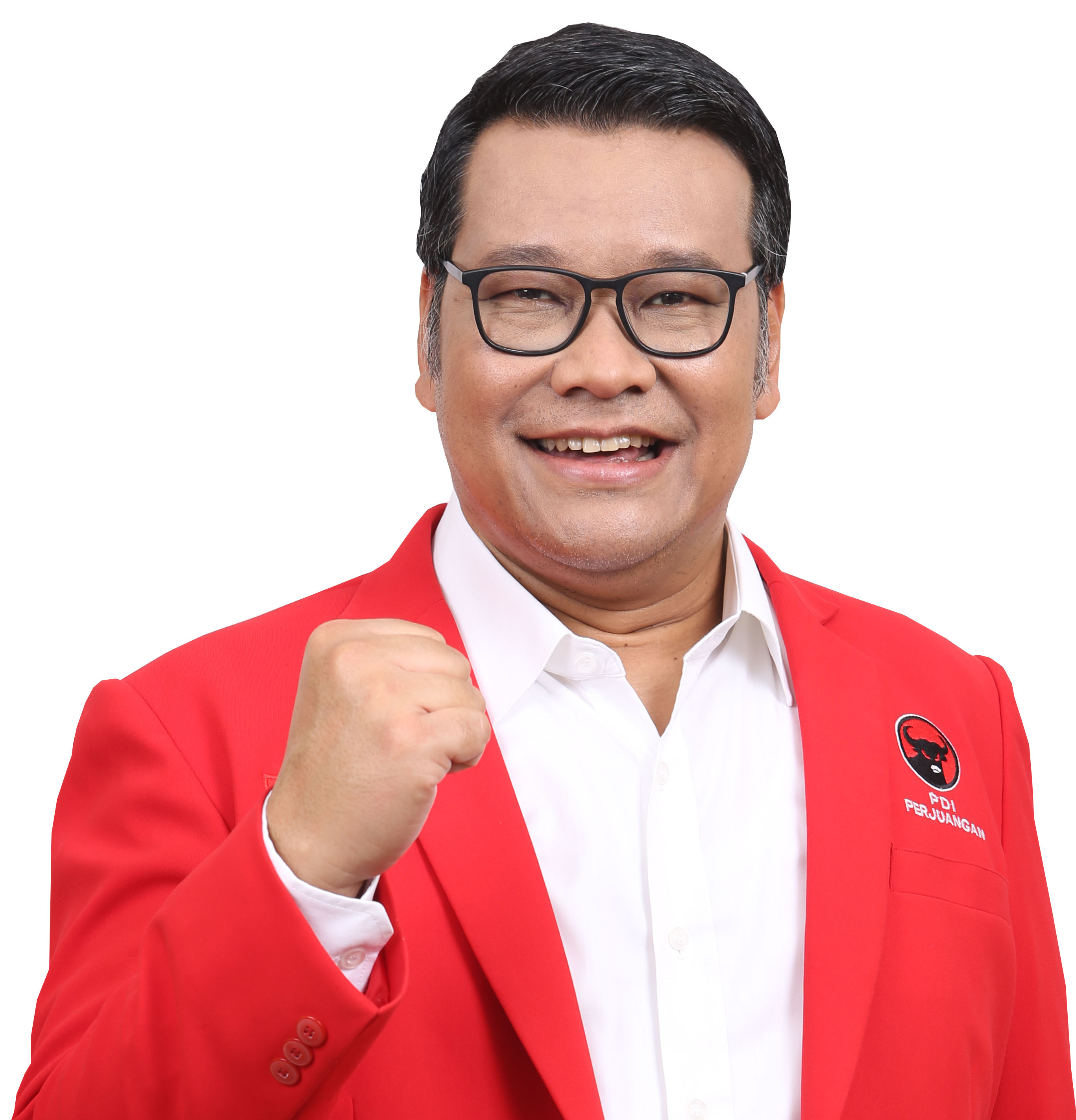

Member of People's Representative Council
- In office 1 October 2009 – 1 October 2024
- Constituency: Jakarta II

Personal details
- Born: 10 April 1969 (age 57) Medan, North Sumatra, Indonesia
- Party: PDI-P
- Education: Trisakti University

Eriko Sotarduga Binsar Pahalatua Sitorus (born 10 April 1969) is an Indonesian politician of the Indonesian Democratic Party of Struggle (PDI-P) who has served as a member of the People's Representative Council since 2009, representing Jakarta's 2nd electoral district.

== Early life ==
Eriko Sotarduga was born in Medan, North Sumatra on 10 April 1969. He is of Batak descent. After completing high school in Medan, he moved to Jakarta where he studied at Trisakti University, obtaining a bachelor's degree in mechanical engineering in 1993.

== Career ==
Eriko is a businessman, with his businesses including oil palm plantations in Riau and in Kalimantan, gas stations, and automobile workshops. He joined the Indonesian Democratic Party of Struggle (PDI-P) in 1999, and became an organizer of PDI-P's youth arm Banteng Muda Indonesia. By 2010, he had moved to the main party, becoming deputy secretary general in 2010.

He was first elected into the People's Representative Council to represent Jakarta's 2nd electoral district following the 2009 election, securing 37,067 votes. Running for reelection in 2014, Eriko established a "Kampung Pemilu" (Election Village) camp in front of party chairman Megawati Sukarnoputri's home in South Jakarta, which provided free haircuts and motorbike repair for locals. He ran similar setups in six subdistricts in Jakarta. Additionally, Eriko also funded mosquito fogging activities. According to Eriko, this allowed him to meet some 1,000 people in his constituency during the three-hour period of the fogging, when residents would remain outdoors. He was reelected for a second term in 2014, and for a third term in 2019 with 104,468 votes. Additionally, he was a spokesperson in Joko Widodo's 2019 campaign team. He was not elected in 2024.

Within the legislature, he has been part of the fifth, sixth, and eleventh commissions. As part of the eleventh commission (covering finance and financial institutions), Eriko has proposed in 2020 that the Financial Services Authority be disbanded and its powers transferred to the central bank, citing a number of insurance and banking scandals. In January 2023, he also proposed that the government-owned Bank Rakyat Indonesia acquire all regional development banks, citing the need to provide improved technology and strengthen the capital base of the regional banks.

== Personal life ==
He is a Christian, and is married to Roslina T. Nainggolan. The couple has three children.
