= Melani Leimena Suharli =

Indonesian politician (born 1951)

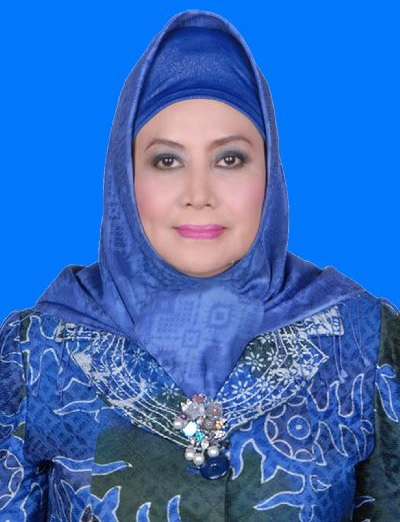

Member of the House of Representatives
- In office 1 October 2009 – 1 October 2024
- Constituency: Jakarta II

Deputy Speaker of People's Consultative Assembly
- In office 3 October 2009 – 30 September 2014
- Speaker: Taufiq Kiemas; Sidarto Danusubroto

Personal details
- Born: 27 January 1951 (age 74); Jakarta, Indonesia
- Political party: Democratic Party
- Parents: Johannes Leimena (father); Raden Tjitjih Wiyarsih Leimena Prawiradilaga (mother)

Melani Leimena Suharli (born 27 January 1951) is an Indonesian politician from the Democratic Party who served as a member of the House of Representatives between 2009 and 2024. Between 2009 and 2014, she served as the deputy speaker of the People's Consultative Assembly.

== Biography ==
Melani Leimena Suharli was born in Jakarta on 27 January 1951. Her father, Johannes Leimena, was a deputy prime minister and is a National Hero of Indonesia, and founded the Indonesian Christian Party. Although her extended family are Christians, Suharli adheres to Islam and she owns a Hajj travel bureau company known as Al-Amin, which was accused of benefiting from preferential treatment from the Ministry of Religious Affairs.

Suharli was elected to the People's Representative Council in the 2009 Indonesian legislative election representing Jakarta's 2nd electoral district as part of the Democratic Party, and was elected as deputy speaker for the People's Consultative Assembly. She was reelected from the same electoral district in the 2014 legislative election, and was assigned to the body's sixth commission.

Suharli criticized the fact that corruption convicts still received pension payments and requested a revision of the existing laws to revoke such payments. She pushed for a proposed sexual violence bill to be included in the country's legislative program in 2015, and called for the government to declare a sexual assault emergency, citing increasing occurrences. In 2018, Suharli called for increased female representation in the People's Representative Council, and for a funding increase for the Ministry of Cooperatives and SMEs to increase the number of entrepreneurs.

She was reelected in 2019 after winning 36,157 votes. She was not reelected in 2024.
