= Roy B. B. Janis =

Indonesian politician (1957–2020)

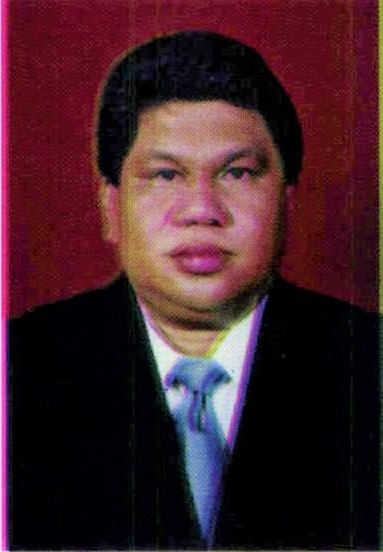

Chairman of the Democratic Renewal Party
- In office 1 December 2005 – 10 May 2009
- Preceded by: Position established
- Succeeded by: Petrus Salestinus

Member of the People's Representative Council
- In office 1 October 1999 – 28 October 2005
- President: B.J. Habibie; Abdurrahman Wahid; Megawati Sukarnoputri; Susilo Bambang Yudhoyono
- Succeeded by: Sabam Sirait
- Constituency: DKI Jakarta (1999-2004) Jakarta II (2004-2005)

Member of the People's Consultative Assembly
- In office 1 October 1992 – 1 October 1997

Personal details
- Born: Roy Binilang Bawatanusa Janis; 22 August 1957 Jakarta, Indonesia
- Died: 28 December 2020 (aged 63) Jakarta, Indonesia
- Party: PDP (2005–2011)
- Other political affiliations: PDI (1986–1999); PDIP (1999–2005)

Roy Binilang Bawatanusa Janis (22 August 1957 – 28 December 2020) was an Indonesian politician who was a member of the People's Representative Council from 1999 until 2005, and was the first chairman of the Democratic Renewal Party.

== Early life and education ==
Janis was born on 22 August 1957 in Jakarta. His parents were both of Sangihe-Talaud origin. His father, Nevton Janis, was the CEO of the Pelni company in Surabaya and was a member of the Indonesian National Party, while his mother, Venesia Kansiro, was a housewife.

Janis completed primary education in Surabaya. In 1970, his parents moved to Jakarta, and he went to the Canisius College Junior High School in Jakarta until he graduated in 1973. After that, he continued his high school at the Saint Theresia High School from 1973 until 1976. Roy continued his study in the Faculty of Law of University of Indonesia (FHUI) in 1977. He graduated from the university nine years later in 1986 with a bachelor thesis titled The Position of Three Vice Presidents According to the Indonesian State Law (Kedudukan Tiga Wakil Presiden Menurut Hukum Tata Negara Indonesia).

Janis achieved his master's degree (S-2) in Military Law School (STHM) with a thesis titled Juridical Analysis: Implementation and Implications on Note Agreement between GAM and the Indonesian Government (Analisis Yuridis Implementasi dan Implikasi Nota Kesepahaman Pemerintah RI dan GAM).

== Student activism and organizations ==
Janis began his involvement in politics since he studied at the Faculty of Law of University of Indonesia in 1977. Janis was elected for a two-year term as a chairperson of the Student's Senate of the Faculty of Law of the University of Indonesia. After his term in the Student's Senate ended, Janis was appointed by the Indonesian National Student Movement to serve as the movement's commissioner in Janis's faculty for two years.

In 1981, Janis founded the Indonesian Youth Cooperatives (Koperasi Pemuda Indonesia, KOPINDO) organization and became the vice secretary of the organization for six years.

=== Indonesian Democratic Party ===
Janis joined the Indonesian Democratic Party after he graduated from the University of Indonesia in 1986. He received his first office appointment when he became a member of the People's Consultative Assembly from the Indonesian Democratic Party on 1 October 1992. Janis was also appointed as the Treasurer of the Jakarta Indonesian Democratic Party from 1994 until 1996.

In 1993, when the General Session of the People's Consultative Assembly was about to be held, Janis joined the Group of 19, a group that attempted to block the re-nomination of President Suharto for his sixth term. However, the group failed, as Suharto was later elected by the assembly for his sixth term as the president of Indonesia.

On the 4th congress of the Indonesian Democratic Party, the daughter of President Sukarno, Megawati Sukarnoputri, was elected as the party's chairwoman. Janis, who was a staunch supporter of Megawati, was appointed as the chairman of the party's branch in Jakarta. However, three years later, the government of Indonesia held a congress in Medan from 20 to 24 June to depose Megawati. Suryadi, the previous Indonesian Democratic Party chairman, was elected as the government-backed chairman of the party. Megawati refused to acknowledge the congress's legitimacy, causing dualism inside the party structure. Janis remained loyal to Megawati during this dualism period.

The dualism culminated in the 27 July 1996 incident, in which the Megawati faction refused to leave the party's headquarters. Megawati entrusted the security of the headquarters to Janis two days before the incident. Megawati then told Janis that the Suryadi faction would raid the headquarters. Janis, who refused to believe any raid of sorts, left the headquarters at 5 AM on 27 July 1996. The Suryadi faction raided the headquarters at 6.30 AM, inflicting casualties among the Megawati faction. In a 2008 interview, Janis blamed the casualties on Megawati, who he believed could evacuate supporters of the Megawati faction to a safe place outside the headquarters.

=== Indonesian Democratic Party of Struggle ===
On 15 February 1999, the Megawati faction officially formed the Indonesian Democratic Party of Struggle. Janis retained his old office as the chairman of the party's branch in Jakarta. He was also nominated by the party as the member of the People's Representative Council for the 1999 Indonesian legislative election. He led the party to victory in Jakarta, where the party obtained a majority of seats in the Jakarta Regional People's Representative Council, and he himself was elected into the People's Representative Council.

Due to sharp differences in Bali Congress of PDIP in April 2005, which was the beginning of the Renewal Movement of the Indonesian Democratic Party of Struggle, he resigned from his membership in the People's Representative Council in October 2005. On 1 December 2005, together with his colleagues from the Renewal Movement, he formed the Renewal Democratic Party. He was elected as the Chairman of the National Collegial Board.

== Personal life ==
Janis was married to Jeni Suryanti Jonosewojo. They had three children: Ratih Dewi Nindita (born 1983), Kanti Wisnuwardhani (born 1985), and Tri Astrini Megaputri (born 1991).

He died on 28 December 2020, at Pertamina Central Hospital, Jakarta, at the age of 63.
