= Municipal Police (Indonesia) =

Indonesian municipal police units

Municipal Police Unit
- Satuan Polisi Pamong Praja
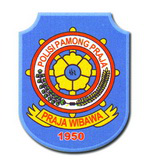

Agency overview
- Formed: 3 March 1950 (first unit in Yogyakarta)
- Jurisdiction: Indonesia (vary by locality)
- Motto: Praja Wibawa (Guardian by authority)
- Minister responsible: Tito Karnavian, (Minister of Home Affairs of the Republic of Indonesia)

The Municipal Police Unit (Indonesian: Polisi Pamong Praja, lit. 'Public Servants Police or Country / City Administrators Police', or translated as "Public Order Enforcers Police" or simply 'Municipal Police', abbreviated as Satpol PP or POL PP) are municipal police units throughout Indonesia which are under the control of the local governments of each province, city, and regency.

== Purpose ==
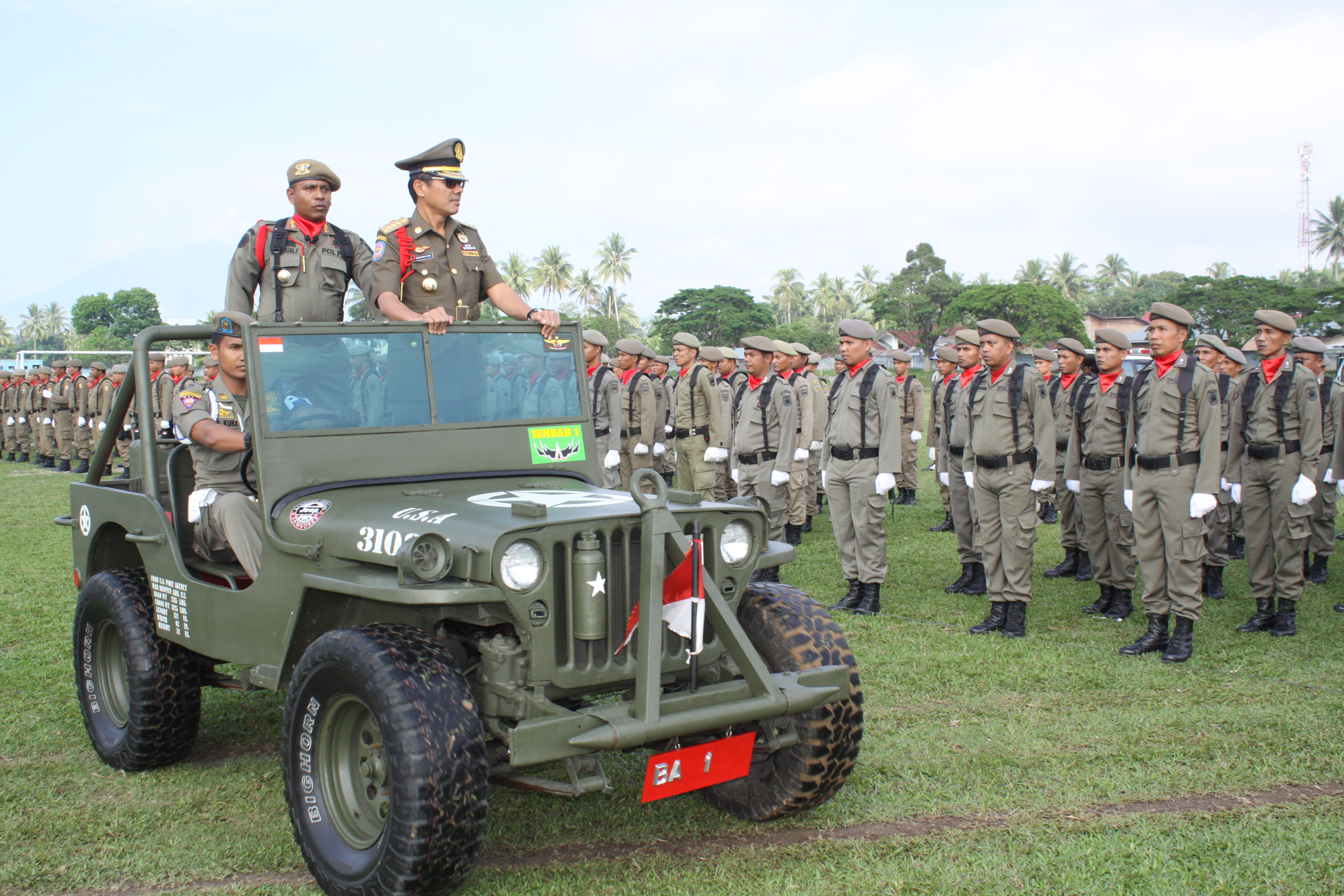
Satpol PP policemen being inspected by the governor of West Sumatra, Irwan Prayitno in 2016 wearing the uniform as the Chief of the Provincial Municipal Police

=== Function ===
According to the Government Regulation No. 6 of 2010 regarding the Satuan Polisi Pamong Praja, its functions are:

1. preparing and implementing regional regulations enforcement, implementation of public order, public security and protection of the community;
2. enforcing policies of the regional regulations and regional head regulations;
3. administer public and community order in the regions;
4. implementing community protection policies;
5. implementing coordination in the enforcement of regional regulations and regional head regulations, implementation of public order and public security in coordination with the Indonesian National Police (Polri), regional Civil Servant Investigative agencies, and/or other apparatus;
6. supervising the community, apparatus, or legal entities in order to comply with the regional regulations and regional head regulations; and
7. implementing other duties mandated and/or instructed directly by the regional head (governor, mayor and/or regent)

=== Authority ===
1. carry out non-judicial enforcement actions towards the public, officials, or legal entities that violate the local regulations
2. take action against the public, civil apparatus, or legal entities that disturb and create nuisance to the public order and security;
3. carry out investigations towards members of the public, apparatus, or legal entities that are suspected of violating the regional regulations and/or regional head regulations; and
4. carry out administrative actions towards members of the public, apparatus, or legal entities that are suspected of violating the regional regulations and/or regional head regulations.

== Management ==
The Satpol PP's purpose is to assist regional heads (provincial governors, city mayors and/or regents) in enforcing regional regulations and administering public order and public security.

The Satpol PP is formed in every province, city, and/or regency under the auspices of the Ministry of Home Affairs.

=== Differences with the National Police (Polri) ===
There has been some confusion and mix-up about the roles and responsibilities of the municipal police units and the Indonesian National Police among the general public.

Generally, the municipal police enforces the policies and laws of the local government's regulation, therefore answering to their respective area's head of government.

Meanwhile, the Indonesian National Police enforces the Indonesian national constitutional laws and regulations. They report to the Chief of the Indonesian National Police (Kapolri) which then is responsible to the President.

Operationally, both law enforcement institutions coordinate with each other in implementing law enforcement duties throughout Indonesia. Arrests made towards members of the public suspected of breaking any law concerned with the constitution of the country is done by the Indonesian National Police, the Satpol PP meanwhile may arrest people in a situational scenario but has to hand it over to the police.

The Satpol PP are not armed meanwhile the police are armed.

== Ranks and insignia ==
The municipal and regional units and their personnel, which come from the civil service of local governments, form the police arm of the wider Employees' Corps of the Republic of Indonesia (Korps Pegawai Republik Indonesia), the state trade union of civil service staff, and thus wear insignia similar to those used by the civil service while wearing the Ceremonial uniform (PDU), service uniform (PDH), and field uniform (PDL).

They wear brown shoulder boards with the service uniform and gold in the ceremonial dress uniform, with red piping used by senior ranked personnel in command billets. In addition, they wear the brown beret regardless of uniform.

Rank category	Rank category number	Rank in Indonesian	Equivalent rank (with US General Schedule and UK Civil Service paygrade)	Rank in English (Municipal Police personnel only)
Directors and Commissioners	IV/e	Pembina Utama	Director General; Senior Executive Service Level V, Pay Band 3 A7	Director
Directors and Commissioners	IV/d	Pembina Utama Madya	Director; Senior Executive Service Level V Pay Band 2 A7	Chief Commissioner
Directors and Commissioners	IV/c	Pembina Utama Muda	Deputy Director; GS-15, Pay Band 2 A6	Commander
Directors and Commissioners	IV/b	Pembina Tingkat I	Assistant Director; GS-14, Grade 6 A5	Senior Commissioner
Directors and Commissioners	IV/a	Pembina	Senior Executive Officer 1st class GS-14, Grade 7 A4	Commissioner
Subaltern and Field ranked officers	III/d	Penata Tingkat I	Senior Executive Officer 2nd class GS-13, Grade 7 A3	Chief Superintendent
Subaltern and Field ranked officers	III/c	Penata	Higher Executive Officer 1st Class; GS-12, Grade 7 A2	Superintendent
Subaltern and Field ranked officers	III/b	Penata Muda Tingkat I	Higher Executive Officer; GS-11, A2	Chief Inspector
Inspectors	III/a	Penata Muda	Executive Officer 1st class GS-10, A2/B6	Inspector
Senior clerical officials	II/d	Pengatur Tingkat I	Executive Officer 2nd class GS-9, A1/B6	Sub-inspector
Senior clerical officials	II/c	Pengatur	Executive Officer; GS-8, A1/B5	Brigadier Major
Middle level clerical officials	II/b	Pengatur Muda Tingkat I	Administrative Officer Class 1 GS-7, B4	Brigadier 1st Class
Middle level clerical officials	II/a	Pengatur Muda	Administrative Officer Class 2 GS-6, B4	Senior Brigader
Junior clerical officials	I/d	Juru Tingkat I	Higher Clerical Officer 1st class GS-5, B3	Brigadier
Junior clerical officials	I/c	Juru	Higher Clerical Officer; GS-4/GS-3, B3	Junior Brigadier
Junior clerical officials	I/b	Juru Muda Tingkat I	Clerical Officer; GS-2, B2	Senior Constable
Junior clerical officials	I/a	Juru Muda	Administrative Assistant; GS-1, B1	Constable

== Controversy ==
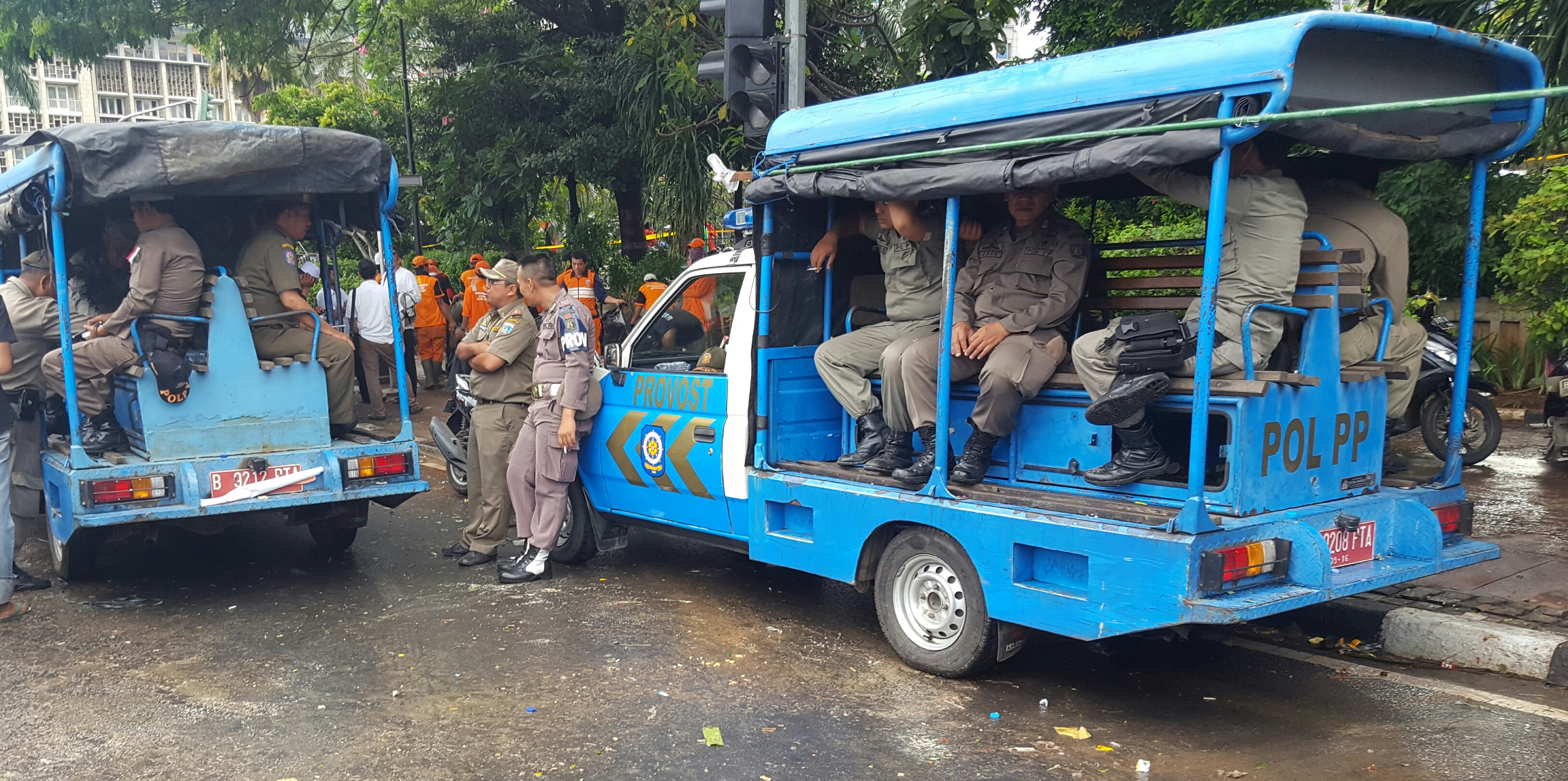
Municipal policemen (Satpol PP) in Jakarta on their patrol vehicles

In 2010, a controversial decree by Gamawan Fauzi (then Minister of Home Affairs), allows members of the unit to be armed with gas-powered revolvers or blanks, electric shock sticks, and baton for riots and crowd control.
