= Democratic Renewal Party (Indonesia) =

Democratic Renewal Party Partai Demokrasi Pembaruan
- Chairman: Presidium with Petrus Selestinus as daily executive chairman
- Secretary-General: Robert Samosir
- Founded: 1 December 2005
- Dissolved: 1 June 2011
- Split from: Indonesian Democratic Party of Struggle
- Merged into: National Unity Party
- Headquarters: Jakarta
- Ideology: Pancasila; Social liberalism Progressivism; Indonesian nationalism Populism
- Political position: Centre-left
- Ballot number: 16
- DPR seats: 0

Website
- http://www.pdp.or.id

The Democratic Renewal Party (Indonesian: Partai Demokrasi Pembaruan (PDP)) was a political party in Indonesia. It was established in 2005 by former members of the Indonesian Democratic Party – Struggle (PDI-P) who were once close aides of party leader Megawati Sukarnoputri. Following the 2005 PDI-P congress, differences appeared over the nature of democratic methods within the party. A group of people, including Petrus Selestinus, took the view that although the PDI-P was a modern political party, it still used the old authoritarian methods such as giving absolute prerogative rights to the party chairman and having only one candidate for senior positions. This group then established the Democratic Renewal Party. Unlike the PDI-P, it had a system of collective leadership, with 35 people forming the national leadership.

The party contested the 2009 elections, but won only 0.9 percent of the vote, less than the 2.5 percent electoral threshold, meaning it gained no seats in the People's Representative Council.

Following its poor result in the 2009 vote, the party joined nine other smaller parties to form the National Unity Party (Indonesian: Partai Persatuan Nasional).

== Election results ==
=== Legislative election results ===
Election	Ballot number	Leader	Seats		Total votes	Share of votes	Outcome of election
Election	Ballot number	Leader	No.	±	Total votes	Share of votes	Outcome of election
2009	16	Roy B. B. Janis	0 / 560		896,959	0.86%	Governing coalition

=== Presidential election results ===
Election	Ballot number	Pres. candidate	Running mate	1st round (Total votes)	Share of votes	Outcome	2nd round (Total votes)	Share of votes	Outcome
2009	2	Susilo Bambang Yudhoyono	Boediono	73,874,562	60.80%	Elected			
