= Tri Tharyat =

Indonesian diplomat (born 1966)

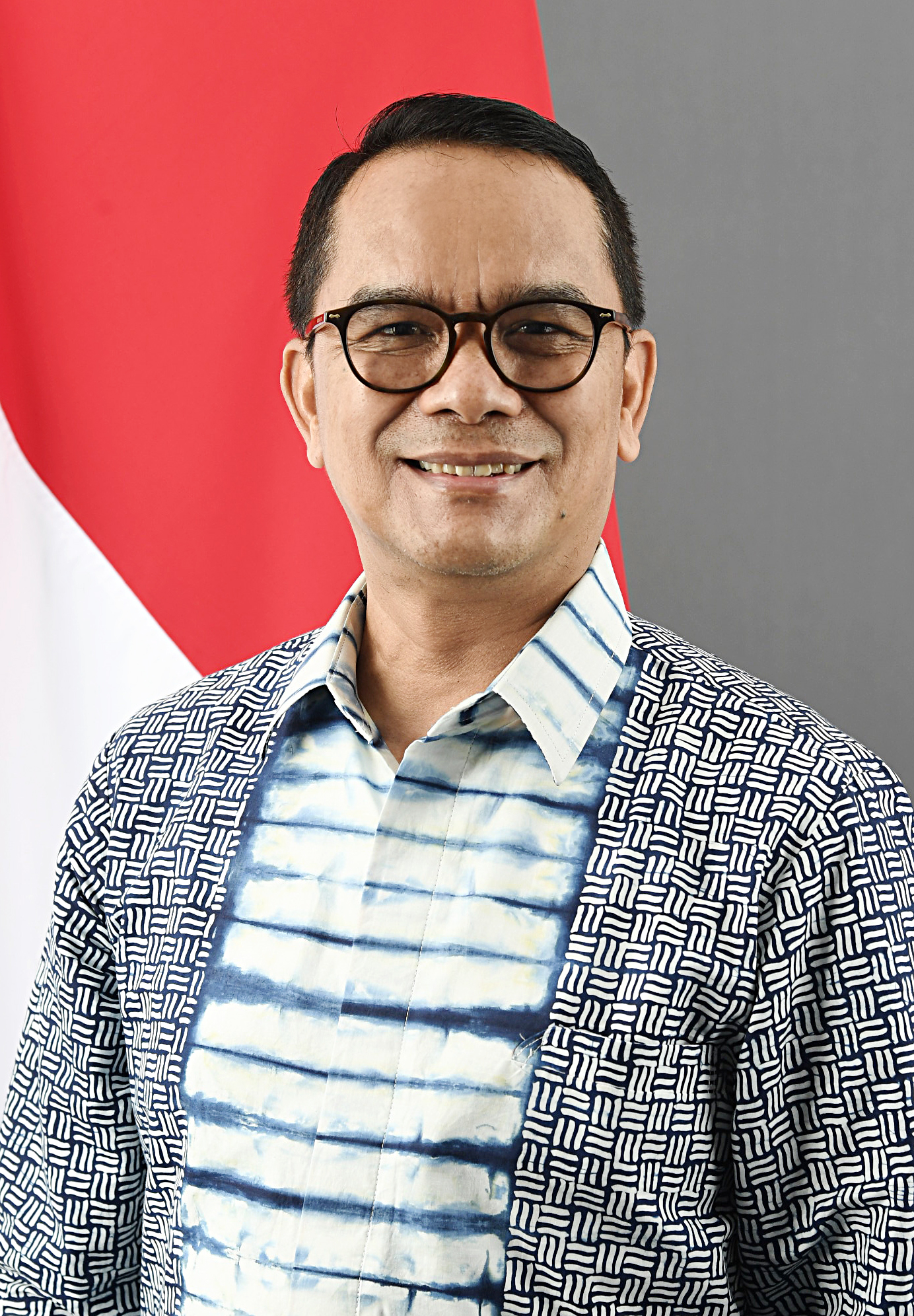

Director General of Multilateral Cooperation
- In office 27 April 2022 – 23 April 2026
- Preceded by: Febrian Alphyanto Ruddyard; Ibnu Wahyutomo (acting)
- Succeeded by: Denny Abdi (acting)

Ambassador of Indonesia to Kuwait
- In office 7 January 2019 – 29 April 2021
- President: Joko Widodo
- Preceded by: Tatang Budie Utama Razak
- Succeeded by: Lena Maryana

Personal details
- Born: April 9, 1966 (age 60) Bandung, West Java, Indonesia
- Spouse: Rina Tri Tharyat
- Education: Padjadjaran University (S.H.); University of Colorado Boulder; University of Pennsylvania Law School (LL.M)

Tri Tharyat (born 9 April 1966) is an Indonesian diplomat who served as director general of multilateral cooperation from 2022 to 2026. Prior to his appointment, he served as ambassador to Kuwait and advisor (expert staff) to the foreign minister for political, legal, and security affairs.

== Early life and education ==
Born in Bandung on 9 April 1966, Tri Tharyat studied international law at the Padjadjaran University, where he graduated with a bachelor's degree in 1990. He continued his studies in the United States, attending the Economic Institute at the University of Colorado Boulder in 1995, and the University of Pennsylvania Law School in Philadelphia from 1995 to 1996, where he earned a master of laws in international and comparative law.

== Career ==
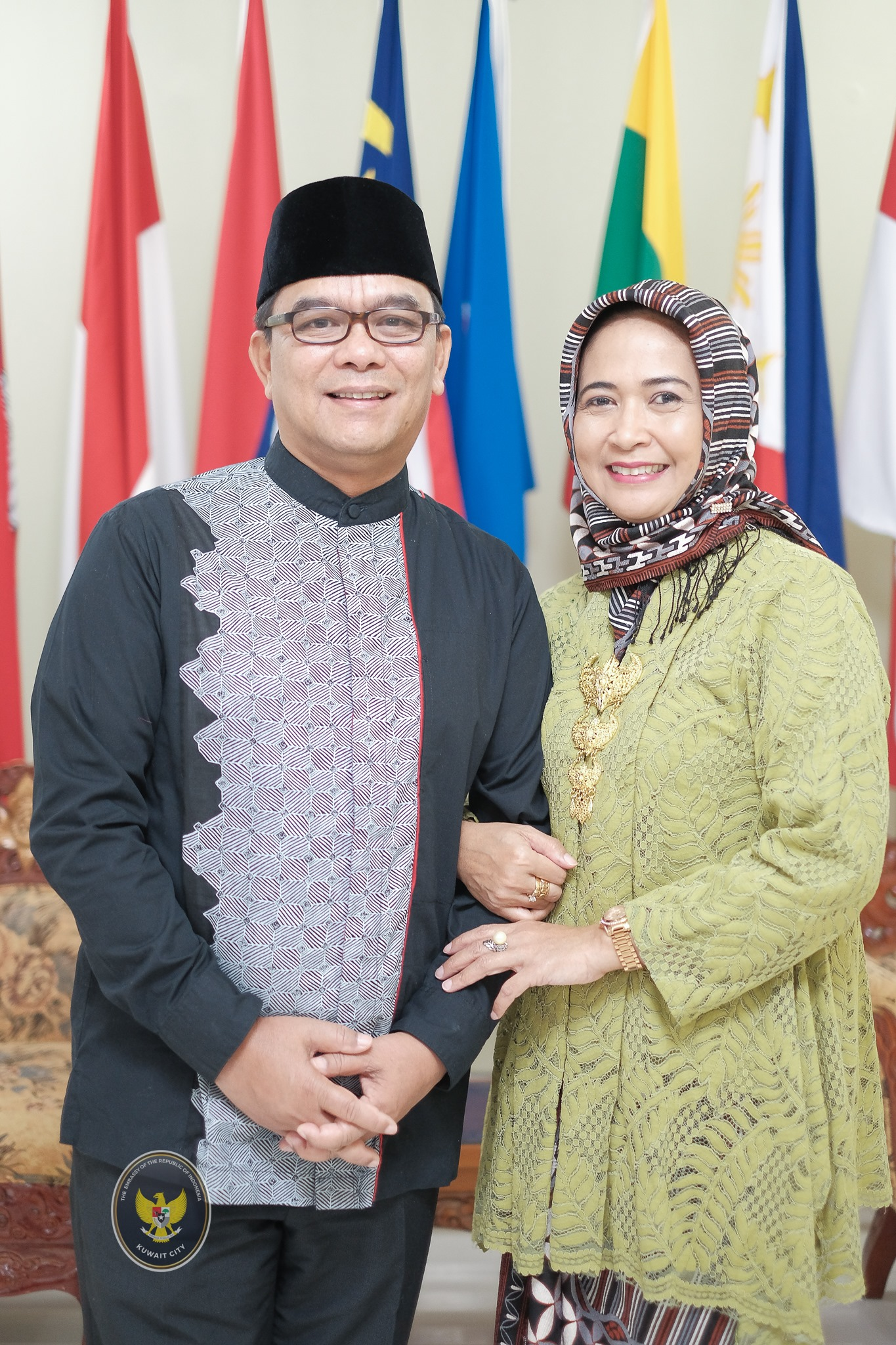
Tri Tharyat and Rina, his wife, in 2019.

Tri began his foreign service career in 1991. From 1996 to 1997, he became the chief of technical cooperation section in the directorate for international treaties, followed by assignment at the political and multilateral section at the embassy in Nairobi, Kenya, with the rank of third secretary from 1997 to 2001. From 2001 to 2003, he became the chief of environmental affairs section in the directorate of economic development and environmental affairs. He was then posted at the economic and development affairs section of the permanent mission to the United Nations in New York from 2004 to 2007 with the rank of second secretary, and later first secretary.

Returning to Jakarta, he became the deputy director (chief of subdirectorate) for sustainable development from 2008 to 2010. In 2010, he represented Indonesia as a negotiator for the Copenhagen talk, in which he rejected the Danish proposal linked to the Copenhagen climate agreement because it would impose binding emission reduction targets on developing countries, potentially threatening their sovereignty. He was then posted overseas at the economic section within the embassy at Paris with the rank of minister counsellor from 2010 to 2013. He became the consular director at the foreign ministry from 2013 to 2016. As consular director, Tri negotiated visa on arrival for Indonesian citizens visiting China and granted visa exemption for foreign search and rescue personnels who were involved in the search for Indonesia AirAsia Flight 8501.

On 23 August 2016, Tri became the consul general in Hong Kong. He presented his consular certificate to China's foreign ministry commissioner in Hong Kong, Song Zhe, on 26 October 2016. Tri was praised for his charismatic figure and his close ties with the Indonesian community, as well as developing a friendly image for the consulate general.

In September 2018, President Joko Widodo nominated Tri for ambassador to Kuwait. After passing an assessment held by the House of Representative's first commission in October, on 7 January 2019 he was installed as ambassador. He presented his credentials to the Emir of Kuwait Sabah Al-Ahmad Al-Jaber Al-Sabah on 1 July 2019. During his ambassadorship, he worked to enhance comprehensive relations and cooperation, exploring agreements on visa-free short visits, investment protection, air transportation, and oil cooperation. He also actively promoted Indonesian tourism and culture through various events, including a series of batik promotions. He handed over his post to chargé d'affaires ad interim Adi Kuntarto on 29 April 2021.

After serving in Kuwait, on 18 August 2021 Tri was appointed as the foreign minister's advisor (expert staff) for political, legal, and security affairs. Less than a year later, on 27 April 2022 Tri became the director general of multilateral cooperation. In August 2024, Tri was nominated by President Joko Widodo as ambassador to Thailand, but was later cancelled by President Prabowo Subianto. He entered retirement on 23 April 2026 and was appointed as the foreign minister's special staff (advisor) with responsibilities on strengthening multilateral cooperation policies.

On 10 August 2026, Tri was nominated by President Prabowo Subianto as ambassador to Spain. He underwent a parliamentary vetting process by the House of Representative's first commission on 23 September 2026.
