= Himmatul Aliyah =

Indonesian politician (born 1970)

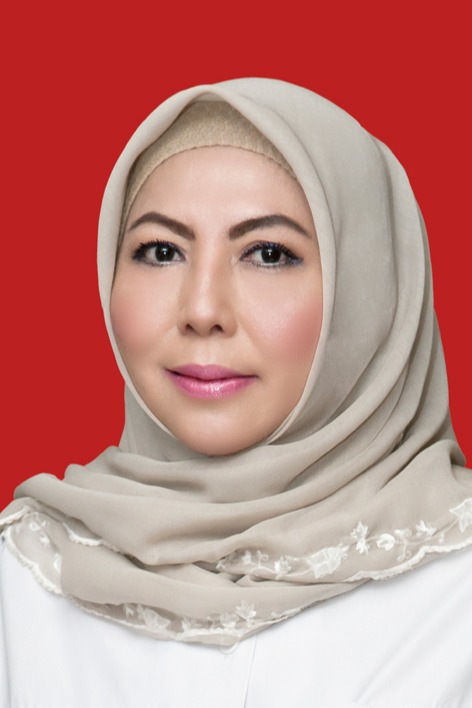

Member of People's Representative Council
- Incumbent
- Assumed office 1 October 2019
- Constituency: Jakarta II

Personal details
- Born: 11 June 1970 (age 55) Tangerang, West Java, Indonesia
- Party: Gerindra

Himmatul Aliyah (born 11 June 1970) is an Indonesian politician of the Gerindra Party who has served as a member of the People's Representative Council, representing Jakarta's 2nd electoral district, since 2019.

== Early life ==
Himmatul was born in Tangerang, then part of West Java, on 11 June 1970. She was educated in state-funded schools there, graduating from high school in 1989. She enrolled at the Syekh Yusuf Islamic University Tangerang, graduating with a bachelors in public administration in 1996. She later also studied at the University of Indonesia, receiving a masters in communication in 2007.

== Career ==
She began working as a reporter and as a radio talk host after graduating from high school, before later becoming a civil servant at the Ministry of Education and Culture starting in 1997.

Himmatul unsuccessfully ran as a senatorial candidate to represent Banten in the 2014 Indonesian legislative election, receiving 208,296 votes and placing sixth out of 26 candidates. In 2015, she was chairman of the association of Gerindra legislators' spouses. She ran again in the 2019 Indonesian legislative election, this time as a candidate for the People's Representative Council representing Jakarta's 2nd electoral district. She received 92,289 votes, and was elected as the sole Gerindra legislator from the district. She was reelected for a second term in the 2024 election with 94,543 votes.

She is part of the legislature's tenth commission, which covers education, sports, and tourism. She has proposed that contract teachers in Indonesian state schools be given permanent positions as government employees. She has also spoke out against a proposed tax on the educational sector. On curriculum, Himmatul has proposed that religious studies be given more lesson slots.

== Personal life ==
She is married to Ahmad Muzani, a senior Gerindra politician who had served as the party's secretary-general and as deputy speaker of the People's Consultative Assembly. The couple have four children.
