= Tatang Budie Utama Razak =

Indonesian diplomat (born 1962)

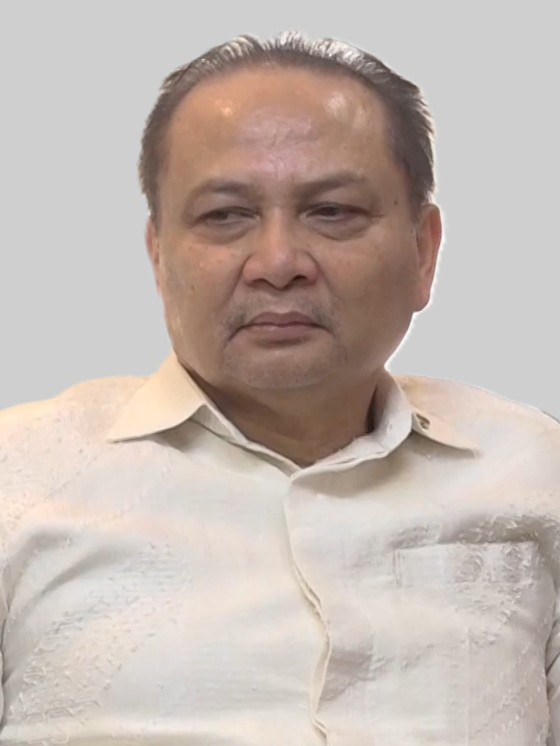

Ambassador of Indonesia to Colombia, Antigua and Barbuda, Barbados, and Saint Kitts and Nevis
- Incumbent
- Assumed office 25 October 2021
- President: Joko Widodo; Prabowo Subianto
- Preceded by: Priyo Iswanto

Chief of the National Agency for Placement and Protection of Indonesian Workers
- Acting
- In office 20 October 2019 – 15 April 2020
- President: Joko Widodo
- Preceded by: Nusron Wahid
- Succeeded by: Benny Rhamdani

Principal Secretary of the National Agency for Placement and Protection of Indonesian Workers
- In office 23 May 2018 – 30 November 2021
- Preceded by: Hermono
- Succeeded by: Rinardi

Ambassador of Indonesia to Kuwait
- In office 15 October 2014 – 29 September 2018
- President: Joko Widodo
- Preceded by: Ferry Adamhar
- Succeeded by: Tri Tharyat

Personal details
- Born: April 7, 1962 (age 64) Palembang, South Sumatra, Indonesia
- Spouse: Marita Fatimah
- Education: Padjadjaran University (Drs.); European International University (MBA)

Tatang Budie Utama Razak (born 7 April 1962) is an Indonesian diplomat serving as the Ambassador of Indonesia to the Republic of Colombia, with concurrent accreditation to Antigua and Barbuda, Barbados, and the Federation of Saint Kitts and Nevis, since October 25, 2021. Prior to this, he served as ambassador to Kuwait and principal secretary of the National Agency for Placement and Protection of Indonesian Workers.

== Early life and education ==
Born in Palembang on April 7, 1962, Tatang was raised in Sumedang. In 1980, he began studying international relations at the Padjadjaran University and graduated with a bachelor's degree in 1986. He received his Master of Business Administration from the European University in Paris, France, in 1995.

== Career ==
Tatang Budie Utama Razak joined the foreign ministry in March 1987. He was assigned to the embassy in Paris as third secretary for political affairs in 1992, serving until 1995. He then returned for a brief stint at the foreign ministry before returning for overseas assignment as a staff for political affairs at the permanent mission in New York with the rank of second secretary. He was later promoted to first secretary and became a senior press officer.

=== Embassy in Malaysia ===
Upon serving in the permanent mission, in 2006 Tatang was assigned to the embassy in Kuala Lumpur as counsellor for protocol and consular affairs. He also led the embassy's task force for protection and service for Indonesian citizen, in which he was responsible for protecting Indonesian migrant workers in the country. In 2008, he became the deputy ambassador in the embassy and the chargé d'affaires ad interim, as the post of ambassador was still vacant at that time. Upon the appointment of Da'i Bachtiar as ambassador, he continued to serve as deputy ambassador until 2010.

During his tenure in Malaysia, Tatang was a vocal critic of Malaysia's lack of cooperation and failure to report cases involving Indonesian citizens, which he opined was a breach of the Vienna Convention principles. He described the justice system in Malaysia for Indonesians as unfair, as legal processes are slow when Indonesians are victims and vice versa when they were suspects. Tatang's assertive approach, which rejected the old familial approach taken by the Suharto administration, was lauded by foreign minister Hassan Wirajuda, who awarded him with the Indonesian Citizen Protection Award. Detik also described Tatang as the "lion of the Kuala Lumpur embassy". He also received awards in public service from President Susilo Bambang Yudhoyono and state apparatus minister Taufiq Effendi.

=== Director of Indonesian citizen protection ===
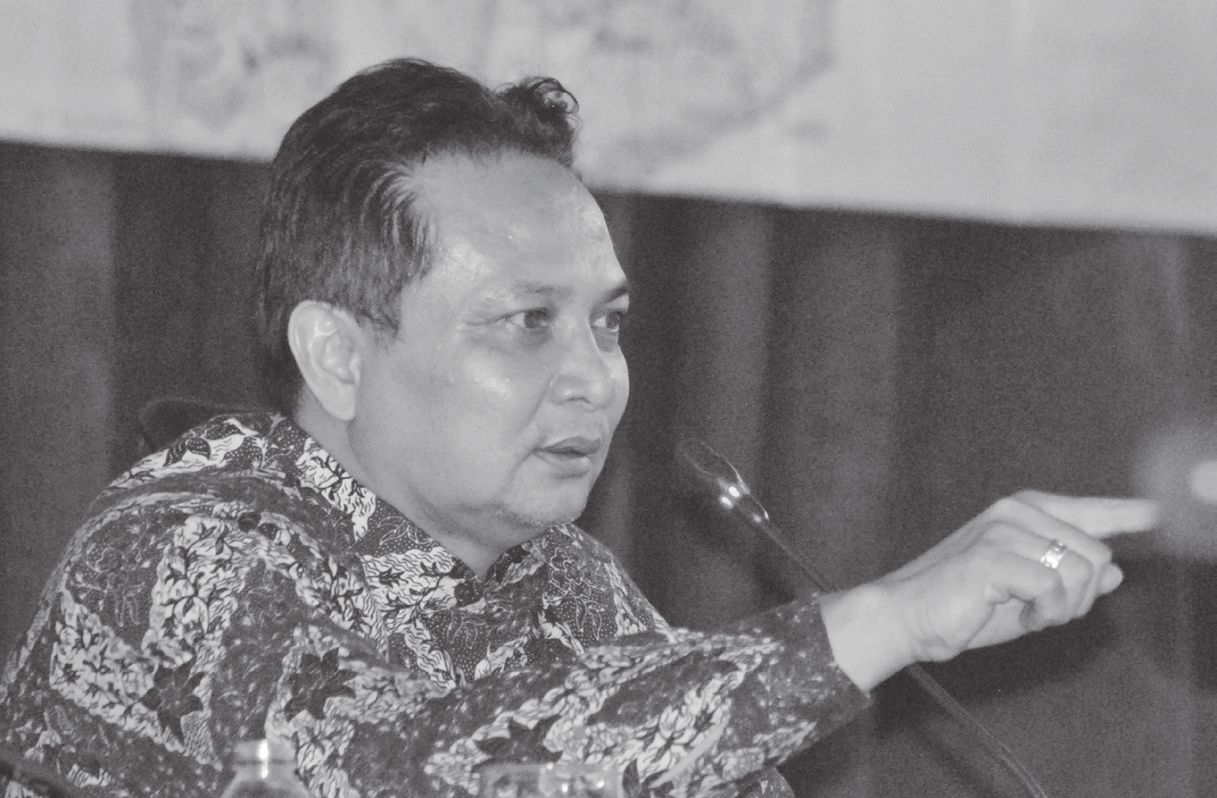
Tatang Budie Utama Razak as director of Indonesian citizen protection

On 3 September 2010, Tatang assumed office as the director for the Indonesian citizen protection and legal aid in the foreign ministry. During his tenure, he provided assistance to Indonesian citizens who are facing legal charges and death penalty. He was involved in organizing the repatriation of Darsem and Diyah, two Indonesian maids in Saudi Arabia who escaped the death penalty after the Indonesian government paid her blood money. In July 2011, Tatang was appointed into a presidential task force aimed at providing legal assistance and advocacy for Indonesian migrant workers facing legal challenges abroad.

=== Ambassador to Kuwait ===
Tatang was installed as ambassador to Kuwait on 15 October 2014 by Susilo Bambang Yudhoyono, five days before his presidential term ended. He presented his credentials to the Emir of Kuwait Sabah Al-Ahmad Al-Jaber Al-Sabah on 17 March 2015. Tatang continued his works in the protection of Indonesian citizens, where in August 2015 he oversaw the repatriation of Indonesian citizens who were taken hostage by pirates and was abandoned on Kuwait's Bubiyan Island and undocumented Indonesians. During the several months of the end of his term, from January to September 2018 Tatang was the chairman of ASEAN Committee in Kuwait. In his capacity, he organized a series of annual sports events and an informal luncheon with the Farwaniya province governor Faisal H. M. Al-Sabah.

=== National Agency for Placement and Protection of Indonesian Workers ===
On 23 May 2018, Tatang was installed as the principal secretary of the National Agency for Placement and Protection of Indonesian Workers after passing an open selection process in January that year. Shortly after his appointment, Tatang collaborated with the manpower ministry to eliminate overlapping roles and strengthen the placement and protection of migrant workers. He also introduced a five-point discipline, which consisted of time, physical, administration, service, and protection discipline, and conducted monthly workspace visits to every unit in the agency.

Shortly after the election of agency chief Nusron Wahid to the House of Representatives, Tatang took office as acting chief of the agency. During his half-year tenure as acting chief, he oversaw major changes to the agency, with the agency being renamed to Indonesian Migrant Workers Protection Agency. He also planned a major change on the agency's structure, budgeting, and human resources, including its focus to send more skilled laborers abroad. The agency revamp was tied to the larger labor reform agenda aimed at simplifying regulations and human resources development. Tatang returned to his office as principal secretary in April 2020 and resigned from the agency on 30 November 2021.

=== Ambassador to Colombia ===
On 4 June 2021, Tatang was officially nominated by President Joko Widodo as ambassador to Colombia, with concurrent accreditation to Antigua and Barbuda, Barbados, and Saint Kitts and Nevis. Upon passing an assessment by the House of Representative's first commission in July, Tatang was installed on 25 October. Tatang presented his credentials to President of Colombia Iván Duque on 1 June 2022, Governor-General of Saint Kitts and Nevis Tapley Seaton on 19 June, and Governor-General of Antigua and Barbuda Rodney Williams on 5 September 2022. During his tenure, he established Casa de Indonesia, the Indonesian culture center, on 31 August 2022, and Amigos de Indonesia, an Indonesia-Colombian friendship association, on 30 September 2023.

== Personal life ==
Tatang is married to Marita Fatimah.
