= Priyo Iswanto =

Indonesian diplomat (born 1962)

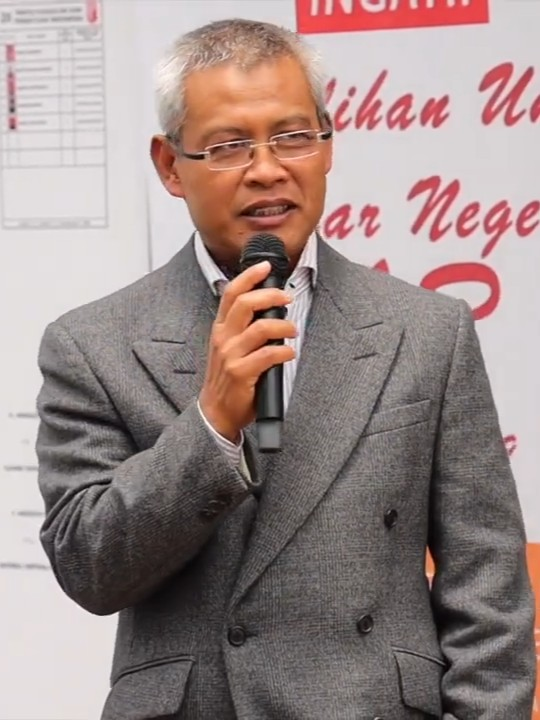

Ambassador of Indonesia to Colombia
- In office 18 May 2017 – 2021
- President: Joko Widodo
- Preceded by: Trie Edi Mulyani
- Succeeded by: Tatang Budie Utama Razak

Personal details
- Born: 10 May 1962 (age 64) Kudus, Central Java, Indonesia
- Education: Diponegoro University (Drs.); Padjadjaran University (M.H.)
- Profession: Diplomat, Lecturer

Priyo Iswanto (born 10 May 1962) is an Indonesian diplomat who last served as ambassador to Colombia, with concurrent accreditation to Saint Kitts and Nevis, Antigua and Barbuda, and Barbados from 2017 to 2021.

== Early life and education ==
Priyo was born in Kudus, Central Java, on 10 May 1962. He completed his undergraduate studies at Diponegoro University, where he obtained a bachelor's degree in English literature in 1985. He later continued his academic pursuits, earning a master's degree in law from Padjadjaran University in 2005.

== Career ==
Priyo served in a number of diplomatic positions, including chief of the foreign department's personnel bureau from 2004 to 2011, deputy chief of mission at the embassy in Rome from 2011 to 2014, and as assistant deputy for American and European cooperation within the coordinating ministry for political, legal, and security between 2014 and 2017.

In November 2016, Priyo was nominated by President Joko Widodo for ambassador to Colombia, with concurrent accreditation to Saint Kitts and Nevis and Antigua and Barbuda. He passed an assessment by the House of Representative's first commission the next month and was installed on 18 May 2017. He presented his credentials to President of Colombia Juan Manuel Santos on 8 May 2017, Governor-General of Saint Kitts and Nevis Tapley Seaton on 6 June 2017, and Deputy Governor-General of Antigua and Barbuda Clare Roberts on 16 June 2017. As ambassador, Priyo stated his focus on enhancing economic and trade cooperation and voiced his support on the presence of the Indonesian-founded spiritual movement SUBUD, which has around 1,000 followers in Colombia, as a strong, pre-existing cultural link.

Iswanto's efforts in promoting bilateral relations have been recognized with several distinctions. In May 2018, the Colombian National Police Academy presented him with the "Francisco de Paula Santader's" award for his service in enhancing relations, specifically in law and democracy. In November 2018, he was named the "Best member of Diplomatic Corps in Colombia" by the press organization Gracetas de Colombia for strengthening bilateral relations and improving the positive perception of Colombia. In May 2019, he received an award from the Faculty of Medicine at the National University of Bogota for his promotion of Indonesia through guest lectures at the university.

Throughout his tenure, the embassy opened honorary consulate in its accredited countries. The embassy opened an honorary consulate in Saint Kitts and Nevis headed by honorary consul Faron T. Lawrence in September 2019, followed by Antigua Barbuda with the appointment of honorary consul Paul Ryan in August 2021. It was also during his tenure that Indonesia abolished visa requirements for Saint Kitts and Nevis and Antigua Barbuda in September 2017 and August 2021, respectively.

Priyo was also instrumental in establishing diplomatic relations between Indonesia and Barbados following WhatsApp contacts with Barbados foreign minister Jerome Walcott in April 2019, after similar proposals since 2011 were stalled. According to his memoir, Priyo obtained Barbados foreign minister's WhatsApp number from Canada's resident ambassador in Barbados Marie Legault, who delivered his concern to Prime Minister of Barbados Mia Mottley. Although he retrospectively stated that his act of directly contacting Barbados's foreign minister was undiplomatic, he argued that such acts were necessary for furthering Indonesia's national interest. Diplomatic relations were officially established on 26 June 2019 with a joint communiqué signed by both nation's representative to the United Nations in New York.

Priyo was replaced in 2021, and by 2022 he joined the Malang Muhammadiyah University as an international relations lecturer. He also become an advisor for international relations to the university.
