= Lena Maryana =

Indonesian politician (born 1962)

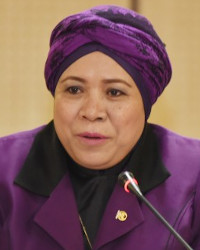

Ambassador of Indonesia to Kuwait
- Incumbent
- Assumed office 15 October 2021
- Preceded by: Tri Tharyat

Member of People's Representative Council
- In office 2 October 2018 – 1 October 2019
- Preceded by: Okky Asokawati
- In office 1 October 2004 – 1 October 2009
- In office 1997–1999
- Constituency: Jakarta 2

Personal details
- Born: Lena Maryana Mukti; 22 December 1962 (age 62); Jakarta, Indonesia

Lena Maryana Mukti (born 22 December 1962) is an Indonesian ambassador and politician who is Indonesian Ambassador to Kuwait, serving since October 2021. She was previously a member of the People's Representative Council, serving in 1997–1999, 2004–2009, and 2018–2019.

== Career ==
Lena Maryana Mukti was born on 22 December 1962 in Jakarta, the second child of ten.

She was elected into the People's Representative Council in 2004 following the 2004 Indonesian legislative election. once more ran in the 2014 Indonesian legislative election, as a United Development Party candidate.

On 15 October 2021, she was appointed Indonesia's ambassador to Kuwait.
