= Ministry of Home Affairs (Indonesia) =

Government ministry of Indonesia

- Kementerian Dalam Negeri
- Arms of Ministry of Home Affairs

- Flag of the Ministry of Home Affairs

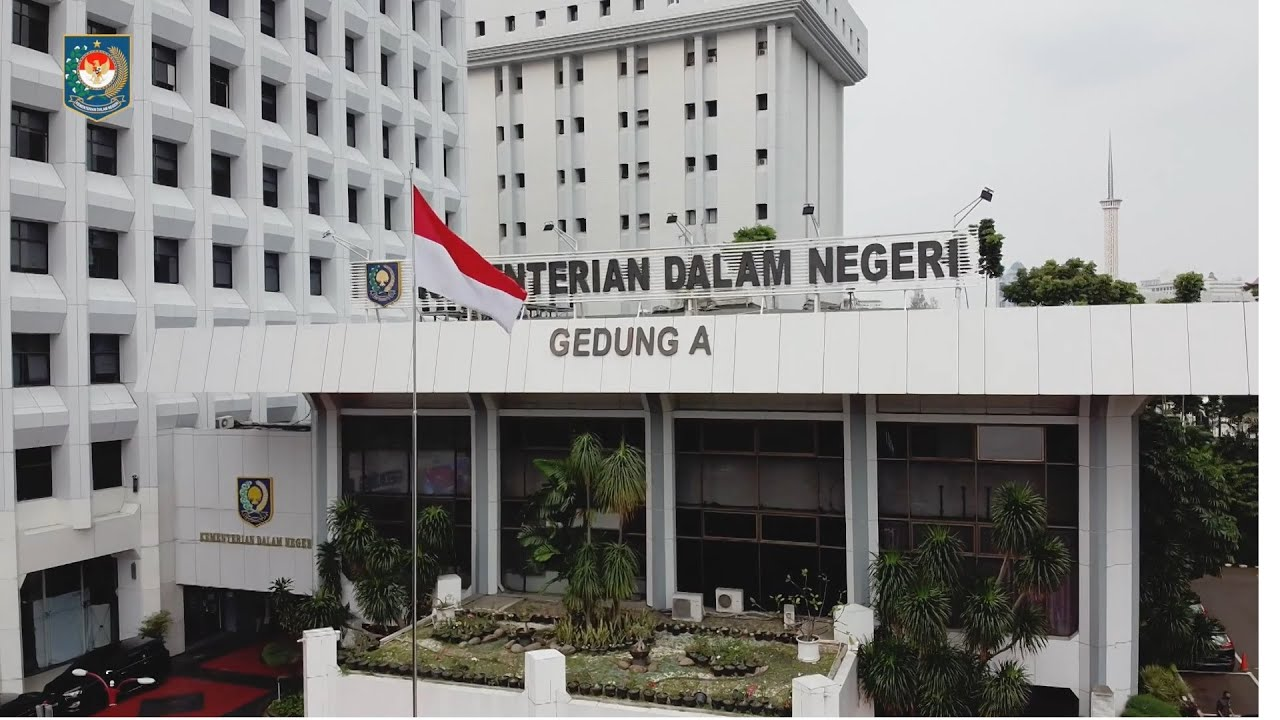
- Ministry of Home Affairs headquarters

Ministry overview
- Formed: 19 August 1945; 81 years ago as Department of Internal Affairs
- Preceding Ministry: Departement van Binnenlands Bestuur (Dutch East Indies) 内務部 (Naimubu) (Japanese occupation of the Dutch East Indies)
- Jurisdiction: Government of Indonesia
- Headquarters: Jalan Medan Merdeka Utara No. 7 Jakarta Pusat 10110 Jakarta, Indonesia
- Minister responsible: Tito Karnavian, Minister of Home Affair
- Deputy Ministers responsible: Bima Arya Sugiarto, First Deputy Minister of Home Affair; Akhmad Wiyagus, Second Deputy Minister of Home Affair
- Parent department: Coordinating Ministry for Political and Security Affairs
- Child agencies: Home Affairs Governance Colleges; Municipal Police (Satpol PP)
- Key document: Constitution of Indonesia
- Website: www.kemendagri.go.id

The Ministry of Home Affairs (Indonesian: Kementerian Dalam Negeri; abbreviated as Kemendagri) is an interior ministry of the government of Indonesia responsible for matters of the state. The ministry was formerly known as the Department of Home Affairs (Departemen Dalam Negeri; Depdagri) until 2010 when the nomenclature of the Department of Home Affairs was changed to the Ministry of Home Affairs in accordance with the Regulation of the Minister of Home Affairs Number 3 of 2010 on the Nomenclature of the Ministry of Home Affairs.

The ministry – along with the Ministry of Defense and Ministry of Foreign Affairs, is explicitly mentioned in the constitution of Indonesia. Therefore, the ministry cannot be dissolved by the president.

According to Article 8 of the Constitution, in case that both the president and the vice president can no longer serve at the same time, the line of succession temporarily falls to a troika of the minister of foreign affairs, the minister of home affairs, and minister of defense who would govern concurrently until the succeeding president and vice president are elected by the People's Consultative Assembly within thirty days of the posts' vacancy.

The ministry is headed by the minister of home affairs. Starting 23 October 2019, Tito Karnavian held this office.

== History ==
The Indonesian Department of Home of Affairs traces its origin to the Departement van Binnenlands Bestuur of the Dutch East Indies Government. Its main function was to oversee police force, transmigration, and agrarian matters. It existed until 1942, the year of the Japanese invasion. During the Japanese occupation (1942-1945) the name was changed to Naimubu (内務部). Its function was expanded to oversee religious, social, health, education, pedagogic, and cultural matters. Naimubu maintained its operations from its office at Jalan Sagara no. 7 Djakarta until 1945. On 19 August 1945 Naimubu was split into several departments:

- Department of Home Affairs (Departemen Dalam Negeri); at the time, still overseeing religious matters; Religious matters would eventually be handed over to the newly established Department of Religious Affairs
- Department of Social Affairs
- Department of Health
- Department of Education, Teaching, and Culture

The Department of Home Affairs was the first government department established under the Presidential Cabinet of Indonesia following independence. Due to changes of political situation and the constitution, the department was renamed several times. The nomenclature "Departemen Dalam Negeri" (Department of Home Affairs) was changed to "Kementerian Dalam Negeri" (Ministry of Home Affairs) in 2010.

== Responsibilities ==
The main responsibilities of the ministry are the formulation, determination and implementation of policies related to political and general governance; regional autonomy; development of regional and village administration and matters of governance; regional development and finance as well as demographics and civil records. it also reviews laws passed by provincial legislatures. The home affairs minister officially inaugurates elected provincial governors on behalf of the president.

If both the president and the vice president are unable to carry out their duties, Article 8 of the Constitution states that they are replaced by a three-person team comprising the minister of foreign affairs, minister of home affairs and minister of defence pending the selection of a president and vice-president by the People's Consultative Assembly within thirty days.

== Organization ==
Based on Presidential Regulation No. 149/2024 on the Ministry of Home Affairs, as well as Home Minister Regulation No. 9/2025 on the Organization and Administration of the Ministry of Home Affairs, the ministry is organized into the following:

=== Executive ===
- Minister of Home Affairs (Indonesian: Menteri Dalam Negeri), who heads the entire ministry and is a member of the cabinet.
- Deputy Minister of Home Affairs (Indonesian: Wakil Menteri Dalam Negeri), who assists the Minister in performance of his duties

=== Directorates General ===
- Directorate General of Politics and General Governance (Indonesian: Direktorat Jenderal Politik dan Pemerintahan Umum) is tasked with policy drafting and execution concerning politics and general governance. It is subdivided into several units, as follow:
  - DG Secretariat
  - Directorate of National Ideology, Character, and Vision (Direktorat Bina Ideologi, Karakter dan Wawasan Kebangsaan)
    - Directorate Secretariat (Sekretariat Direktorat)
    - Sub-Directorate of State Civil Defense (Sub-Direktorat Bela Negara)
    - Sub-Directorate of National Assimilation and History (Sub-Direktorat Pembauran dan Sejarah Kebangsaan)
    - Sub-Directorate of Apparatuses Ideological Guidance (Sub-Direktorat Bina Ideologi Aparatur)
  - Directorate of Internal Politics (Direktorat Politik Dalam Negeri)
    - Directorate Secretariat (Sekretariat Direktorat)
    - Sub-Directorate of Internal Political Policies Implementation (Sub-Direktorat Implementasi Kebijakan Politik Dalam Negeri)
    - Sub-Directorate of Political Parties Facilitation (Sub-Direktorat Fasilitasi Partai Politik)
    - Sub-Directorate of Facilitation for National Political Ethics Education (Sub-Direktorat Fasilitasi Pendidikan Etika Politik Kebangsaan)
    - Sub-Directorate of Facilitation of General Election and Democracy Development (Sub-Direktorat Fasilitasi Pemilihan Umum dan Pengembangan Demokrasi)
  - Directorate of Economic, Social, and Cultural Resilience (Direktorat Ketahanan Ekonomi, Sosial, dan Budaya)
    - Directorate Secretariat (Sekretariat Direktorat)
    - Sub-Directorate of Facilitation of Social Conflict Resolution (Sub-Direktorat Fasilitasi Penanganan Konflik Sosial)
    - Sub-Directorate of Harmony Development between Tribes, Religious, Race, Racial Groups, and Traditional Believers (Sub-Direktorat Pembinaan Kerukunan Suku, Umat Beragama, Ras, Golongan, dan Penghayat Kepercayaan)
  - Directorate of Civil Organization (Direktorat Organisasi Kemasyarakatan)
    - Directorate Secretariat (Sekretariat Direktorat)
    - Sub-Directorate of Mediation of Disputes and Conflicts between Civil Organizations (Sub-Direktorat Mediasi Sengketa dan Konflik Organisasi Kemasyarakatan)
    - Sub-Directorate of Monitoring and Evaluation of Civil Organization Performances (Sub-Direktorat Pengawasan dan Evaluasi Kinerja Organisasi Kemasyarakatan)
  - Directorate of National Vigilance (Direktorat Kewaspadaan Nasional)
    - Directorate Secretariat (Sekretariat Direktorat)
    - Sub-Directorate of Early Vigilance and Intelligence Cooperation (Sub-Direktorat Kewaspadaan Dini dan Kerjasama Intelijen)
    - Sub-Directorate of Research Licensing and Foreigners Monitoring (Sub-Direktorat Perizinan Penelitian dan Pengawasan Orang Asing)
- Directorate General of Territorial Administration (Indonesian: Direktorat Jenderal Bina Administrasi Kewilayahan) is tasked with policy drafting and execution concerning territorial administration. It is subdivided into several units, as follow:
  - DG Secretariat
  - Directorate of Deconsentration, Coadministration, and Cooperation (Direktorat Dekonsentrasi, Tugas Pembantuan, dan Kerja Sama)
    - Directorate Secretariat (Sekretariat Direktorat)
    - Sub-Directorate of Facilitation of Governors as Central Government Representative, Deconsentration, Coadministration, and District-level Affairs (Sub-Direktorat Fasilitasi Gubernur sebagai Wakil Pemerintah Pusat, Dekonsentrasi, Tugas Pembantuan, dan Kecamatan)
    - Sub-Directorate of Cooperation and Dispute Resolution between Regions, and General Administration Services (Sub-Direktorat Kerja Sama dan Penyelesaian Perselisihan Antar Daerah, dan Pelayanan Umum)
  - Directorate of Territory, Urban Affairs, and State Border (Direktorat Kawasan, Perkotaan, dan Batas Negara)
    - Directorate Secretariat (Sekretariat Direktorat)
    - Sub-Directorate of Special Territories (Sub-Direktorat Kawasan Khusus)
    - Sub-Directorate of Urban Affairs and Agrarian Problems Facilitation (Sub-Direktorat Perkotaan dan Fasilitasi Masalah Pertanahan)
    - Sub-Directorate of Border Affairs and Outer Islands (Sub-Direktorat Batas Negara dan Pulau-pulau Terluar)
  - Directorate of Municipal Police and Public Safety (Direktorat Polisi Pamong Praja dan Perlindungan Masyarakat)
    - Directorate Secretariat (Sekretariat Direktorat)
    - Sub-Directorate of Operational and Human Resources Standardization for Municipal Police (Sub-Direktorat Standardisasi Tata Operasional dan Sumber Daya Manusia Polisi Pamong Praja)
    - Sub-Directorate of Civil Protection (Sub-Direktorat Perlindungan Masyarakat)
    - Sub-Directorate of Civil Apparatuses Investigators and Civil dan Human Rights Protection (Sub-Direktorat Penyidik Pegawai Negeri Sipil dan Perlindungan Hak-Hak Sipil dan Hak Asasi Manusia)
  - Directorate of Toponym and Regional Border (Direktorat Toponimi dan Batas Daerah)
    - Directorate Secretariat (Sekretariat Direktorat)
    - Sub-Directorate of Regional Borders I (Sub-Direktorat Batas Antar Daerah Wilayah I)
    - Sub-Directorate of Regional Borders II (Sub-Direktorat Batas Antar Daerah Wilayah II)
    - Sub-Directorate of Toponym, Data, and Codification of Governance Administration Regions (Sub-Direktorat Toponimi, Data, dan Kodefikasi Wilayah Administrasi Pemerintahan)
  - Directorate of Disaster and Fire Management (Direktorat Manajemen Penanggulangan Bencana dan Kebakaran)
    - Directorate Secretariat (Sekretariat Direktorat)
    - Sub-Directorate of Operational and Human Resources Standardization for Disaster Management (Sub-Direktorat Standardisasi Tata Operasional dan Sumber Daya Manusia Manajemen Penanggulangan Bencana)
    - Sub-Directorate of Operational and Human Resources Standardization for Fire Management (Sub-Direktorat Standardisasi Tata Operasional dan Sumber Daya Manusia Penanggulangan Kebakaran)
- Directorate General of Regional Autonomy (Indonesian: Direktorat Jenderal Otonomi Daerah) is tasked with policy drafting and execution concerning regional autonomy. It is subdivided into several units, as follow:
  - DG Secretariat
  - Directorate of Regional Arrangement, Special Autonomy, and Regional Autonomy Advisory Council (Direktorat Penataan Daerah, Otonomi Khusus, dan Dewan Pertimbangan Otonomi Daerah)
    - Directorate Secretariat (Sekretariat Direktorat)
    - Sub-Directorate of Regional Arrangement and Regional Autonomy Advisory Council (Sub-Direktorat Penataan Daerah dan Dewan Pertimbangan Otonomi Daerah)
    - Sub-Directorate of Special Autonomy and Exceptional Autonomy (Sub-Direktorat Otonomi Khusus dan Istimewa)
    - Sub-Directorate of Papua Special Autonomy (Sub-Direktorat Otonomi Khusus Papua)
  - Directorate of Regional Executive and Legislature Facilitation (Direktorat Fasilitasi Kepala Daerah dan Dewan Perwakilan Rakyat Daerah)
    - Directorate Secretariat (Sekretariat Direktorat)
    - Sub-Directorate of Region I (Sub-Direktorat Wilayah I)
    - Sub-Directorate of Region II (Sub-Direktorat Wilayah II)
    - Sub-Directorate of Region III (Sub-Direktorat Wilayah III)
  - Directorate of Institutional Facilitation and Regional Apparatuses Employment (Direktorat Fasilitasi Kelembagaan dan Kepegawaian Perangkat Daerah)
    - Directorate Secretariat (Sekretariat Direktorat)
    - Sub-Directorate of Region I (Sub-Direktorat Wilayah I)
    - Sub-Directorate of Region II (Sub-Direktorat Wilayah II)
    - Sub-Directorate of Region III (Sub-Direktorat Wilayah III)
  - Directorate of Regional Legal Products (Direktorat Produk Hukum Daerah)
    - Directorate Secretariat (Sekretariat Direktorat)
    - Sub-Directorate of Region I (Sub-Direktorat Wilayah I)
    - Sub-Directorate of Region II (Sub-Direktorat Wilayah II)
  - Directorate of Performance Evaluation and Regional Capacity Development (Direktorat Evaluasi Kinerja dan Peningkatan Kapasitas Daerah)
    - Directorate Secretariat (Sekretariat Direktorat)
    - Sub-Directorate of Performance Evaluation and Regional Capacity Development Region I (Sub-Direktorat Evaluasi Kinerja dan Pengembangan Kapasitas Daerah Wilayah I)
    - Sub-Directorate of Performance Evaluation and Regional Capacity Development Region II (Sub-Direktorat Evaluasi Kinerja dan Pengembangan Kapasitas Daerah Wilayah II)
- Directorate General of Regional Development (Indonesian: Direktorat Jenderal Bina Pembangunan Daerah) is tasked with policy drafting and execution concerning regional development. It is subdivided into several units, as follow:
  - DG Secretariat
  - Directorate of Regional Development Planning, Evaluation, and Information (Direktorat Perencanaan, Evaluasi, dan Informasi Pembangunan Daerah)
    - Directorate Secretariat (Sekretariat Direktorat)
    - Sub-Directorate of Regional Development Planning, Evaluation, and Information Region I (Sub-Direktorat Perencanaan, Evaluasi, dan Informasi Pembangunan Daerah Wilayah I)
    - Sub-Directorate of Regional Development Planning, Evaluation, and Information Region II (Sub-Direktorat Perencanaan, Evaluasi, dan Informasi Pembangunan Daerah Wilayah II)
  - Directorate of Regional Governance Synchronization I (Direktorat Sinkronisasi Urusan Pemerintahan Daerah I), concerning regional government's land use and spatial planning, energy and mineral resources, agriculture and food, forestry, and environmental affairs
    - Directorate Secretariat (Sekretariat Direktorat)
    - Sub-Directorate of Agrarian and Spatial Arrangement (Sub-Direktorat Pertanahan dan Penataan Ruang)
    - Sub-Directorate of Agriculture and Foods (Sub-Direktorat Pertanian dan Pangan)
    - Sub-Directorate of Forestry (Sub-Direktorat Kehutanan)
    - Sub-Directorate of Environment (Sub-Direktorat Lingkungan Hidup)
  - Directorate of Regional Governance Synchronization II (Direktorat Sinkronisasi Urusan Pemerintahan Daerah II), concerning regional government's public works, housing and settlements, marine affairs and fisheries, and transportation.
    - Directorate Secretariat (Sekretariat Direktorat)
    - Sub-Directorate of Public Works (Sub-Direktorat Pekerjaan Umum)
    - Sub-Directorate of Housing and Settlements (Sub-Direktorat Perumahan dan Permukiman)
    - Sub-Directorate of Marine Affairs and Fisheries (Sub-Direktorat Kelautan dan Perikanan)
    - Sub-Directorate of Transportation (Sub-Direktorat Perhubungan)
  - Directorate of Regional Governance Synchronization III (Direktorat Sinkronisasi Urusan Pemerintahan Daerah III), concerning regional government's sociocultural affairs.
    - Directorate Secretariat (Sekretariat Direktorat)
    - Sub-Directorate of Social and Culture (Sub-Direktorat Sosial dan Budaya)
  - Directorate of Regional Governance Synchronization IV (Direktorat Sinkronisasi Urusan Pemerintahan Daerah IV), concerning regional government's manpower, transmigration, population control, and planned family.
    - Directorate Secretariat (Sekretariat Direktorat)
    - Sub-Directorate of Manpower and Transmigration (Sub-Direktorat Tenaga Kerja dan Transmigrasi)
    - Sub-Directorate of Population Control and Planned Family (Sub-Direktorat Pengendalian Populasi dan Keluarga Berencana)
- Directorate General of Villages Governance (Indonesian: Direktorat Jenderal Bina Pemerintahan Desa) is tasked with policy drafting and execution concerning governance of villages. It is subdivided into several units, as follow:
  - DG Secretariat
  - Directorate of Facilitation for Village Governance Arrangement and Administration (Direktorat Fasilitasi Penataan dan Administrasi Pemerintahan Desa)
    - Directorate Secretariat (Sekretariat Direktorat)
    - Sub-Directorate of Facilitation for Village Spatial Arrangement (Sub-Direktorat Fasilitasi Penataan Wilayah Desa)
    - Sub-Directorate of Facilitation for Village Rights and Village Legal Products (Sub-Direktorat Fasilitasi Penataan Kewenangan Desa dan Produk Hukum Desa)
    - Sub-Directorate of Facilitation for Village Governance Administration (Sub-Direktorat Fasilitasi Administrasi Pemerintahan Desa)
  - Directorate of Facilitation for Village Financial Planning and Village Governance Assets (Direktorat Fasilitasi Perencanaan Keuangan dan Aset Pemerintahan Desa)
    - Directorate Secretariat (Sekretariat Direktorat)
    - Sub-Directorate of Facilitation for Village Development Planning Management (Sub-Direktorat Fasilitasi Pengelolaan Perencanaan Pembangunan Desa)
    - Sub-Directorate of Facilitation for Village Financial Management (Sub-Direktorat Fasilitasi Pengelolaan Keuangan Desa)
    - Sub-Directorate of Facilitation for Village Assets Management (Sub-Direktorat Fasilitasi Pengelolaan Aset Desa)
  - Directorate of Facilitation for Cooperation, Village Governance Institutions, and Village Consultative Bodies (Direktorat Fasilitasi Kerjasama, Lembaga Pemerintah Desa, dan Badan Pemusyawaratan Desa)
    - Directorate Secretariat (Sekretariat Direktorat)
    - Sub-Directorate of Facilitation for Village Cooperation (Sub-Direktorat Fasilitasi Kerjasama Desa)
    - Sub-Directorate of Facilitation for Village Governance Institutions and Village Consultative Bodies (Sub-Direktorat Fasilitasi Lembaga Pemerintah Desa dan Badan Pemusyawaratan Desa)
  - Directorate of Facilitation for Village Civil and Custom Organizations, Family Empowerment and Welfare, and Integrated Servicing Posts (Direktorat Fasilitasi Lembaga Kemasyarakatan dan Adat Desa, Pemberdayaan dan Kesejahteraan Keluarga, dan Pos Pelayanan Terpadu)
    - Directorate Secretariat (Sekretariat Direktorat)
    - Sub-Directorate of Facilitation for Village Civil and Custom Organizations (Sub-Direktorat Fasilitasi Lembaga Kemasyarakatan dan Adat Desa)
    - Sub-Directorate of Facilitation for Family Empowerment and Welfare (Sub-Direktorat Fasilitasi Pemberdayaan dan Kesejahteraan Keluarga)
    - Sub-Directorate of Facilitation for Integrated Servicing Posts (Sub-Direktorat Fasilitasi Pos Pelayanan Terpadu)
  - Directorate of Village Capacity Development, Data, and Development Evaluation (Direktorat Pengembangan Kapasitas Pemerintahan Desa, Data, dan Evaluasi Perkembangan Desa)
    - Directorate Secretariat (Sekretariat Direktorat)
    - Sub-Directorate of Village Capacity Development, Data, and Development Evaluation (Sub-Direktorat Pengembangan Kapasitas Pemerintahan Desa)
    - Sub-Directorate of Facilitation of Data and Information Management (Sub-Direktorat Fasilitasi Pengelolaan Data dan Informasi Desa)
    - Sub-Directorate of Village Development Evaluation (Sub-Direktorat Evaluasi Perkembangan Desa)
  - Indonesian Center for Village Governance, Malang (Balai Besar Pemerintahan Desa, Malang)
  - Indonesian Institute for Village Governance, Yogyakarta (Balai Pemerintahan Desa, Yogyakarta)
  - Indonesian Institute for Village Governance, Lampung(Balai Pemerintahan Desa, Lampung)
- Directorate General of Regional Finance (Indonesian: Direktorat Jenderal Bina Keuangan Daerah) is tasked with policy drafting and execution concerning regional finances. It is subdivided into several units, as follow:
  - Directorate of Regional Budget Planning (Direktorat Perencanaan Anggaran Daerah)
    - Directorate Secretariat (Sekretariat Direktorat)
    - Sub-Directorate of Regional Budget Planning Region I (Sub-Direktorat Perencanaan Anggaran Daerah Wilayah I)
    - Sub-Directorate of Regional Budget Planning Region II (Sub-Direktorat Perencanaan Anggaran Daerah Wilayah II)
    - Sub-Directorate of Regional Budget Planning Region IV (Sub-Direktorat Perencanaan Anggaran Daerah Wilayah IV)
    - Sub-Directorate of Regional Budget Planning Technical Support (Sub-Direktorat Dukungan Teknis Perencanaan Anggaran Daerah)
  - Directorate of Regional Budget Realization and Accountability (Direktorat Pelaksanaan dan Pertanggungjawaban Keuangan Daerah)
    - Directorate Secretariat (Sekretariat Direktorat)
    - Sub-Directorate of Regional Budget Realization and Accountability Region I (Sub-Direktorat Pelaksanaan dan Pertanggungjawaban Keuangan Daerah Wilayah I)
    - Sub-Directorate of Regional Budget Realization and Accountability Information System and Technical Support (Sub-Direktorat Sistem Informasi dan Dukungan Teknis Pelaksanaan dan Pertanggungjawaban Keuangan Daerah)
  - Directorate of Regional Income (Direktorat Pendapatan Daerah)
    - Sub-Directorate of Regional Income Region II (Sub-Direktorat Pendapatan Daerah Wilayah II)
    - Sub-Directorate of Regional Income Region III (Sub-Direktorat Pendapatan Daerah Wilayah III)
  - Directorate of Transfer Facilitation and Regional Loan Funding (Direktorat Fasilitasi Transfer dan Pembiayaan Utang Daerah)
    - Directorate Secretariat (Sekretariat Direktorat)
    - Sub-Directorate of Facilitation of Profit-Sharing Funds and General Allocation Funds (Sub-Direktorat Fasilitasi Dana Bagi Hasil dan Dana Alokasi Umum)
    - Sub-Directorate of Facilitation of Specialized Allocation Funds (Sub-Direktorat Fasilitasi Dana Alokasi Khusus)
    - Sub-Directorate of Regional Funding (Sub-Direktorat Pembiayaan Daerah)
  - Directorate of Region-Owned Enterprises, Public Services, and Properties (Direktorat Badan Usaha Milik Daerah, Badan Layanan Umum Daerah, dan Barang Milik Daerah)
    - Directorate Secretariat (Sekretariat Direktorat)
    - Sub-Directorate of Region-Owned Enterprises, Financial Institutions, and Various Businesses (Sub-Direktorat Badan Usaha Milik Daerah, Lembaga Keuangan, dan Aneka Usaha)
    - Sub-Directorate of Region-Owned Public Services (Sub-Direktorat Badan Layanan Umum Daerah)
    - Sub-Directorate of Region-Owned Properties Region I (Sub-Direktorat Barang Milik Daerah Wilayah I)
- Directorate General of Population and Civil Registration (Indonesian: Direktorat Jenderal Kependudukan dan Catatan Sipil) is tasked with policy drafting and execution concerning population and civil registration. It is subdivided into several units, as follow:
  - DG Secretariat
  - Directorate of Population Documentation (Direktorat Pendaftaran Penduduk)
    - Directorate Secretariat (Sekretariat Direktorat)
    - Sub-Directorate of Monitoring, Evaluation, Documentation, and Management of Population Data (Sub-Direktorat Monitoring, Evaluasi, Dokumentasi, dan Pengelolaan Data Kependudukan)
  - Directorate of Civil Administration Information Management (Direktorat Pengelolaan Informasi Administrasi Kependudukan)
    - Directorate Secretariat (Sekretariat Direktorat)
    - Sub-Directorate of Civil Administration Information System (Sub-Direktorat Sistem Administrasi Kependudukan)
    - Sub-Directorate of Data Center and Disaster Recovery Center Management (Sub-Direktorat Pengelolaan Data Center dan Disaster Recovery Center)
    - Sub-Directorate of Human Resources, Information Technology, and Communication Management (Sub-Direktorat Tata Kelola Sumber Daya Manusia dan Teknologi Informasi dan Komunikasi)
    - Sub-Directorate of Monitoring, Evaluation, and Documentation (Sub-Direktorat Monitoring, Evaluasi, dan Dokumentasi)
  - Directorate of Population and Civil Registration Apparatus (Direktorat Bina Aparatur Kependudukan dan Pencatatan Sipil)
    - Directorate Secretariat (Sekretariat Direktorat)
    - Sub-Directorate of Regional I (Sub-Direktorat Wilayah I)
    - Sub-Directorate of Regional II (Sub-Direktorat Wilayah II)
    - Sub-Directorate of Regional III (Sub-Direktorat Wilayah III)
    - Sub-Directorate of Law Enforcement (Sub-Direktorat Penegakkan Hukum)
  - Directorate of National Population Data Integration (Direktorat Integrasi Data Kependudukan Nasional)
    - Directorate Secretariat (Sekretariat Direktorat)
    - Sub-Directorate of Technical Services, Access Rights, and Integration of Central Population Data (Sub-Direktorat Layanan Teknis, Hak Akses, dan Integrasi Data kependudukan Pusat)
    - Sub-Directorate of Central Population Security (Sub-Direktorat Keamanan Kependudukan Pusat)
    - Sub-Directorate of Monitoring, Evaluation, and Documentation (Sub-Direktorat Monitoring, Evaluasi, dan Dokumentasi)
  - Directorate of Regional Population Data Integration (Direktorat Integrasi Data Kependudukan Daerah)
    - Directorate Secretariat (Sekretariat Direktorat)
    - Sub-Directorate of Monitoring, Evaluation, and Documentation (Sub-Direktorat Monitoring, Evaluasi, dan Dokumentasi)

=== Secretariat ===
Secretariat General (Indonesian: Sekretariat Jenderal) is headed by a Secretary General, tasked with providing administrative support for all units within the ministry. It consisted of 7 bureaus:

- Bureau of Planning (Biro Perencanaan)
- Bureau of Employment (Biro Kepegawaian)
- Bureau of Organization and Administration (Biro Organisasi dan Administrasi)
- Bureau of Legal Affairs (Biro Hukum)
- Bureau of Finance and Assets (Biro Keuangan dan Aset)
- Bureau of Leadership Administration (Biro Administrasi Pimpinan)
- Bureau of General Affairs (Biro Umum)

=== Inspectorate ===
Inspectorate General (Indonesian: Inspektorat Jenderal) is headed by an Inspector General, tasked with internal supervision over all units within the ministry.

- IG Secretariat
- Inspectorate I
- Inspectorate II
- Inspectorate III
- Inspectorate IV
- Special Inspectorate (Inspektorat Khusus), authorized to conduct special inspection, public complaints response, inspection prior to administrative sanctions, as well as other coordinative duties.

=== Agencies ===
- Domestic Policy Strategy Agency (Indonesian: Badan Strategi Kebijakan Dalam Negeri), performing strategic research for the ministry
  - Strategic Policies Center for Regional Autonomy, General Political Governance, and Law Affairs (Pusat Strategi Kebijakan Otonomi Daerah, Politik Pemerintahan Umum, dan Hukum)
  - Strategic Policies Center for Regional Affairs, Population, and Public Services (Pusat Strategi Kebijakan Kewilayahan, Kependudukan, dan Pelayanan Umum)
  - Strategic Policies Center for Development Policies, Regional Finance, and Village Affairs (Pusat Strategi Kebijakan Pembangunan, Keuangan Daerah, dan Desa)
  - Strategic Policies Center for Human Resource Development Policies, Digitalization, and Domestic Governance Innovations (Pusat Strategi Kebijakan Pembangunan Sumber Daya Manusia, Digitalisasi, dan Inovasi Urusan Pemerintahan Dalam Negeri)
- Human Resource Development Agency (Indonesian: Badan Pengembangan Sumber Daya Manusia), performing human resource capability development for the ministry
  - Center for Standardization and Certification (Pusat Standardisasi dan Sertifikasi)
  - Center for Home Governance Competency Development (Pusat Pengembangan Kompetensi Pemerintahan Dalam Negeri)
  - Center for Leadership Management Competency Development (Pusat Pengembangan Kompetensi Manajemen Kepemimpinan)
  - Center for Functionaries Competency Development (Pusat Pengembangan Kompetensi Jabatan Fungsional)
  - Indonesian Center for Home Governance Apparatuses Competencies Development Region I, Agam (Balai Besar Pengembangan Kompetensi Aparatur Wilayah I, Agam)
  - Indonesian Center for Home Governance Apparatuses Competencies Development Region II, Sumedang (Balai Besar Pengembangan Kompetensi Aparatur Wilayah II, Sumedang)
  - Indonesian Center for Home Governance Apparatuses Competencies Development Region III, Yogyakarta (Balai Besar Pengembangan Kompetensi Aparatur Wilayah III, Yogyakarta)
  - Indonesian Center for Home Governance Apparatuses Competencies Development Region IV, Makassar (Balai Besar Pengembangan Kompetensi Aparatur Wilayah IV, Makassar)
  - Indonesian Training Institute for Functionaries Competencies in Territorial Administration, Bogor (Balai Pelatihan Kompetensi Fungsional Aparatur di Bidang Administrasi Kewilayahan, Bogor)
  - Indonesian Training Institute for Functionaries Competencies in Governance Management, Malang (Balai Pelatihan Kompetensi Fungsional Aparatur di Bidang Administrasi Pemerintahan, Malang)
  - Indonesian Training Station for Functionaries Competencies in Public Services, Bandung (Loka Pelatihan Kompetensi Fungsional Aparatur di Bidang Pelayanan, Bandung)

=== Centers attached to the Ministry ===
- Center for Data and Information System (Pusat Data dan Sistem Informasi)
- Center for Information (Pusat Penerangan)
- Center for Partnership Facilitation (Pusat Fasilitasi Kerja Sama)
- Institute of Home Affairs Governance (Institut Pendidikan Dalam Negeri)

=== Advisory Staffs ===
- Advisor to the Minister on Law and National Unity (Indonesian: Staf Ahli Bidang Hukum dan Kesatuan Bangsa)
- Advisor to the Minister on Governance (Indonesian: Staf Ahli Bidang Pemerintahan)
- Advisor to the Minister on Social and Interinstitutional Relations (Indonesian: Staf Ahli Bidang Kemasyarakatan dan Hubungan Antar Lembaga)
- Advisor to the Minister on Economic and Development Affairs (Indonesian: Staf Ahli Bidang Ekonomi dan Pembangunan)
- Advisor to the Minister on Apparatus and Public Service (Indonesian: Staf Ahli Bidang Aparatur dan Pelayanan Publik)

== Logo gallery ==
Logo of the Ministry of Home Affairs (2009–2020)

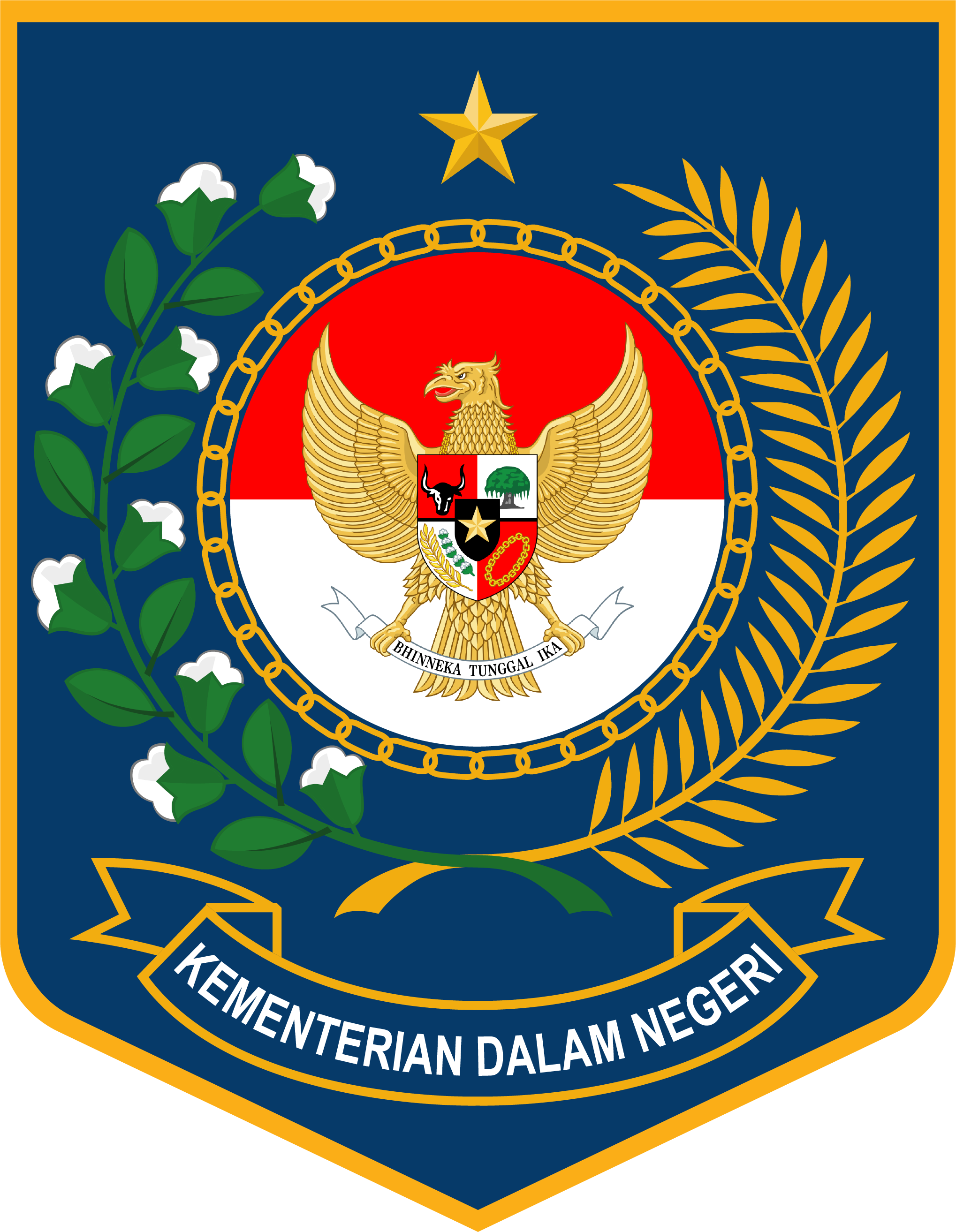
Logo of the Ministry of Home Affairs (2020–present)

== See also ==
- Municipal Police (Indonesia)

== Literature ==
- Butt, Simon; Lindsey, Tim (2012). The Constitution of Indonesia: A Contextual Analysis. Hart Publishing. ISBN 978-1-84113-018-7.
