= Gresik Regency Regional House of Representatives =

Gresik Regency Regional House of Representatives Dewan Perwakilan Rakyat Daerah Kabupaten Gresik
- 2024–2029 period

Type
- Type: Unicameral
- Term limits: 5 years

History
- New session started: 23 August 2024

Leadership
- Speaker: Muhammad Syahrul Munir, PKB since 7 October 2024
- 1st Vice Speaker: Lutfi Dhawam, S.H., Gerindra since 7 October 2024
- 2nd Vice Speaker: Mujid Riduan, S.H., PDI-P since 7 October 2024
- 3nd Vice Speaker: Ahmad Nurhamim, S.Pi., M.Si., Golkar since 7 October 2024

Structure
- Seats: 30
- Political groups: PDI-P (9) NasDem (2) PKB (14) Demokrat (3) PAN (3) Golkar (6) PPP (3) Gerindra (10)

Elections
- Voting system: Open list
- Last election: 14 February 2024

Meeting place
- Gresik Regency Regional House of Representatives Building; K.H. Wachid Hasyim Street; Kebungson, Gresik, Gresik Regency; East Java, Indonesia

Website
- dprd.gresikkab.go.id

The Gresik Regency Regional House of Representatives is the unicameral municipal legislature of Gresik Regency, East Java, Indonesia. It has 50 members, who are elected every five years, simultaneously with the national legislative election.

== Legal basis ==
The legislature for Gresik Regency (formerly known as Surabaya Regency) was formed along with those of other regencies in East Java under Law Number 12 of 1950, which organized regency governments within the province.

== General election results ==
=== 2024 Indonesian legislative election ===
The official valid votes received by political parties contesting the 2024 Indonesian legislative election in each electoral district (constituency) for members of the Gresik Regency Regional House of Representatives are as follows.

2024 Indonesian legislative election results

Electoral district	PKB	Gerindra	PDI-P	Golkar	NasDem	Labour	Gelora	PKS	PKN	Hanura	Garuda	PAN	PBB	Democratic	PSI	Perindo	PPP	Ummat	Valid votes
Gresik 1	22,127	23,520	21,044	11,480	2,662	1,604	570	6,131	73	100	209	6,021	73	6,758	761	302	6,378	2,268	112,081
Gresik 2	27,646	18,437	9,583	8,512	5,614	1,047	95	762	34	47	116	1,063	20	716	344	44	9,973	313	84,366
Gresik 3	39,566	7,196	33,340	11,893	6,910	507	518	906	25	61	129	1,996	61	7,899	433	54	10,890	240	122,624
Gresik 4	32,263	23,978	16,000	17,081	8,573	648	173	946	15	26	46	1,950	139	3,704	395	64	6,031	229	112,261
Gresik 5	24,386	12,013	8,738	11,388	8,058	140	37	311	15	7	15	10,681	18	628	133	32	3,059	136	79,795
Gresik 6	11,764	7,452	9,789	9,159	6,144	136	198	977	10	2	20	9,449	42	7,754	183	27	4,571	1,275	68,952
Gresik 7	10,113	14,875	4,219	5,827	5,441	137	108	534	20	9	20	7,821	29	5,851	107	24	942	1,158	57,235
Gresik 8	11,181	7,270	1,666	3,748	6,631	64	40	244	7	9	18	137	30	9,790	30	8	1,212	31	42,116
Gresik 9	21,131	24,567	19,987	12,597	12,452	1,025	169	4,885	33	146	111	2,961	166	3,133	954	126	8,433	1,178	114,054
Total	200,177	139,308	124,366	91,685	62,485	5,308	1,908	15,696	232	407	684	42,079	578	46,233	3,340	681	51,489	6,828	793,484
Source: General Elections Commission of Indonesia

== Composition ==
The following is the composition of members of the Gresik Regency Regional House of Representatives in the last three periods.

Party	Total seats		
Party	2014–2019	2019–2024	2024–2029
PKB seats	8	▲13	▲14
Gerindra seats	6	▲8	▲10
PDI-P seats	6	6	▲9
Golkar seats	11	▼8	▼6
NasDem seats	1	▲5	▼2
PAN seats	5	▼3	3
Demokrat seats	6	▼4	▼3
PPP seats	7	▼3	3
Total Seats	50	50	50
Total Party	8	8	8

== Electoral District ==
In the 2019 Legislative Election, the Gresik Regency Regional House of Representatives election was divided into 8 electoral districts as follows:

Electoral District Name	Electoral District Area	Number of Seats
GRESIK 1	Gresik, Kebomas	7
GRESIK 2	Cerme, Duduk Sampeyan	5
GRESIK 3	Kedamean, Menganti	7
GRESIK 4	Driyorejo, Wringinanom	7
GRESIK 5	Balongpanggang, Benjeng	5
GRESIK 6	Sangkapura, Tambak (Bawean Island)	4
GRESIK 7	Dukun, Panceng, Ujungpangkah	6
GRESIK 8	Bungah, Manyar, Sidayu	9
TOTAL		50

In the 2024 Legislative Election, the Gresik Regency Regional House of Representatives election was divided into 9 electoral districts as follows:

Electoral District Name	Electoral District Area	Number of Seats
GRESIK 1	Gresik, Kebomas	7
GRESIK 2	Cerme, Duduk Sampeyan	5
GRESIK 3	Kedamean, Menganti	7
GRESIK 4	Driyorejo, Wringinanom	7
GRESIK 5	Balongpanggang, Benjeng	5
GRESIK 6	Dukun, Panceng	5
GRESIK 7	Ujungpangkah, Sidayu	4
GRESIK 8	Sangkapura, Tambak (Bawean Island)	3
GRESIK 9	Manyar, Bungah	7
TOTAL		50

== See also ==
- East Java Regional House of Representatives
- Gresik Regency
- East Java
