= Nazaruddin =

The name Nazaruddin may refer to:

- Nazaruddin Sjamsuddin, former Chairman of the General Elections Commission (KPU).
- Nazaruddin Nasution, Indonesian Ambassador to Cambodia (2000-2003).
- Muhammad Nazaruddin, member of People's Representative Council (DPR) (2009-2014) from Democrat Party.
- Nazarudin Kiemas, member of People's Representative Council (DPR) (2009-2014) from Indonesian Democratic Party of Struggle.
