= 2024 Pontianak mayoral election =

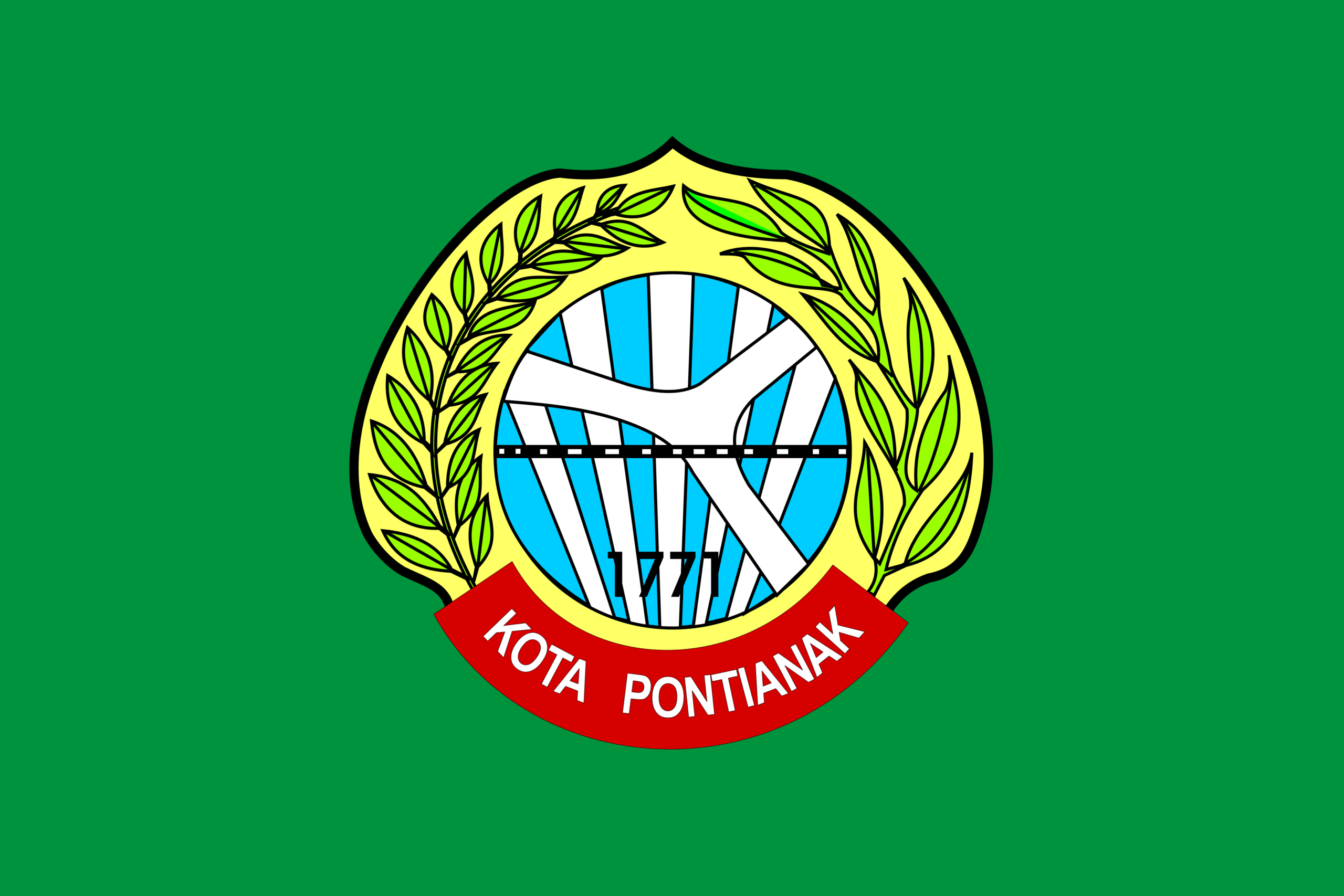
- 27 November 2024
- Registered: 489,208
- Turnout: 53.39%
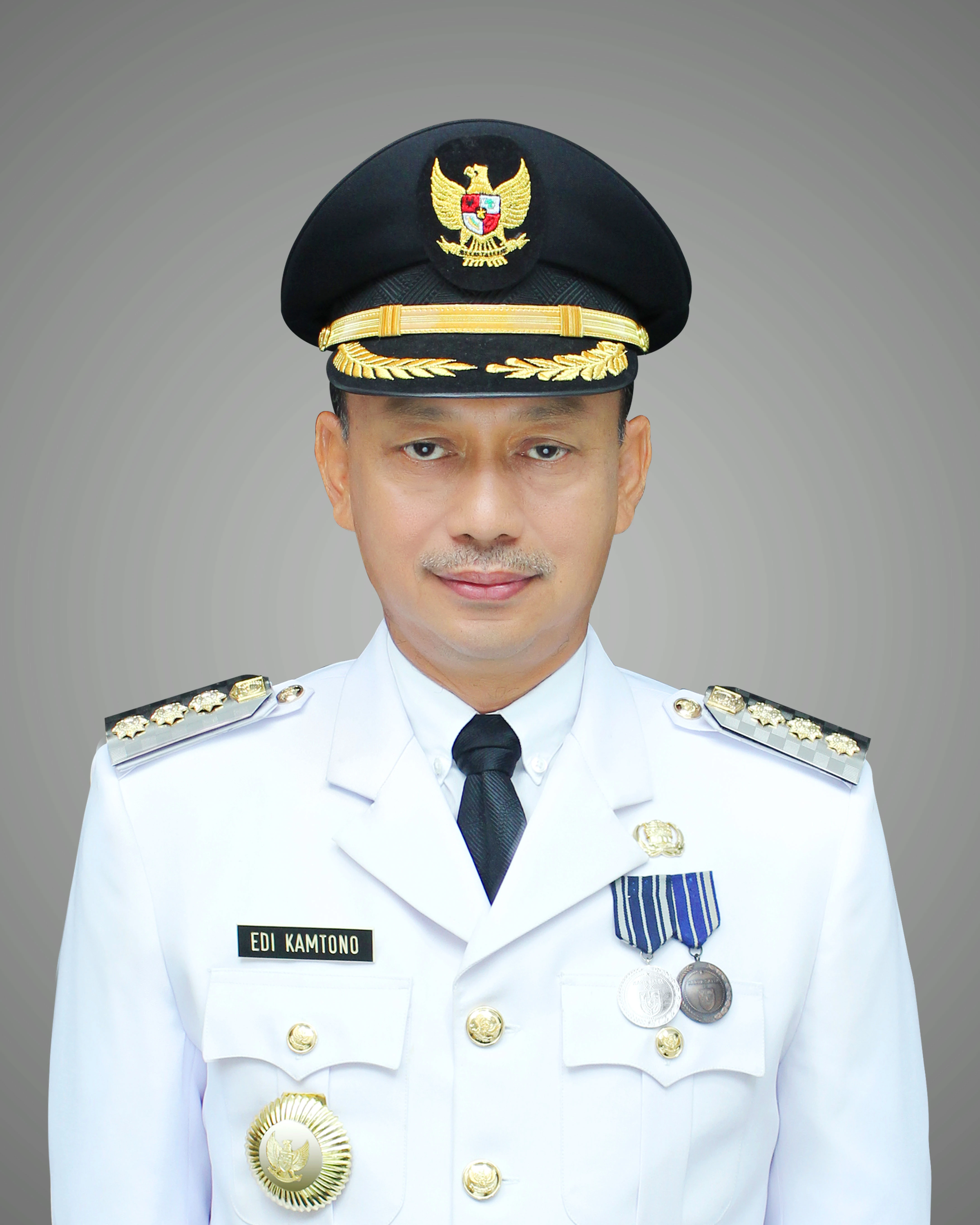

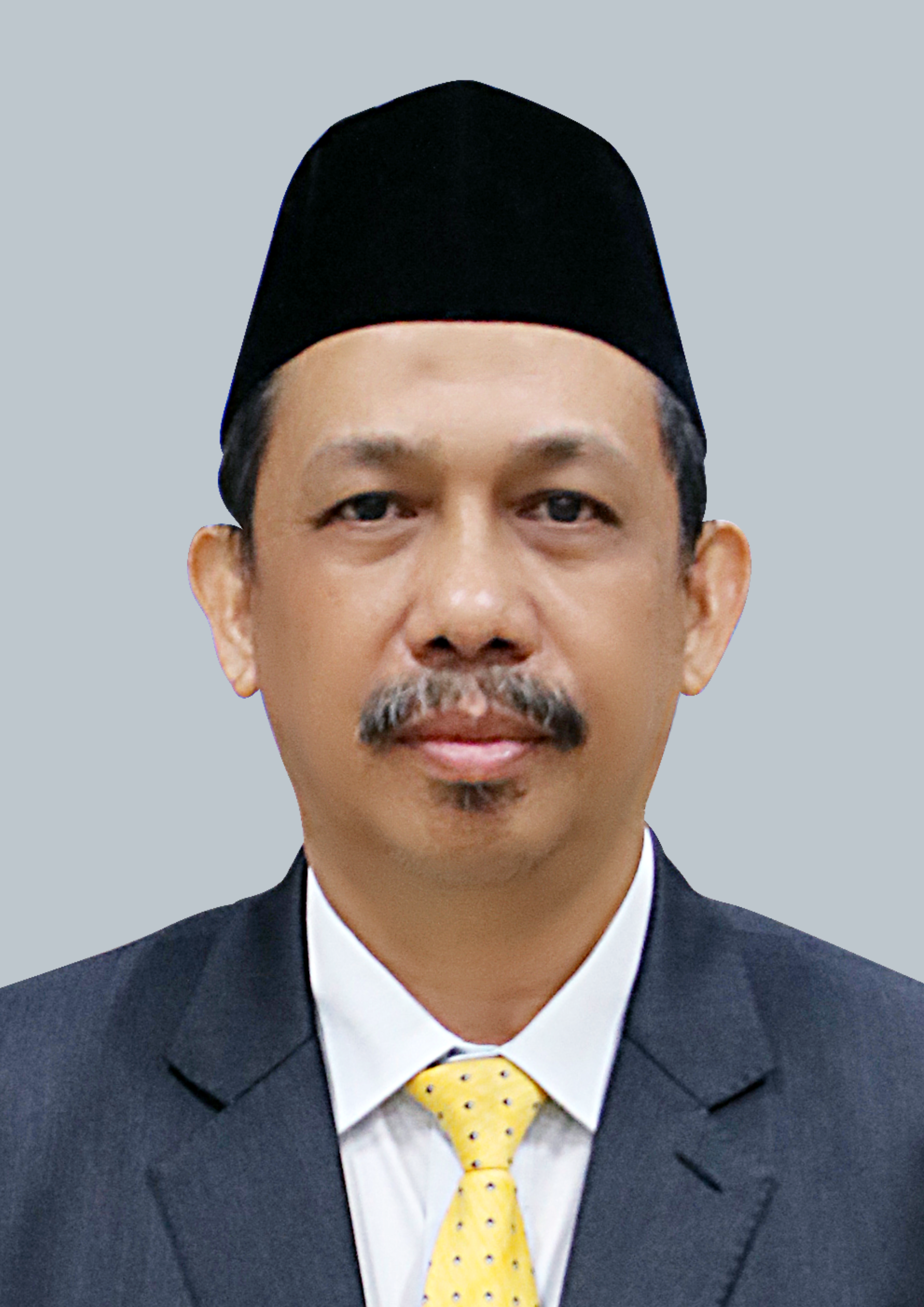
Nominee	Edi Rusdi Kamtono	Mulyadi
Party	Gerindra	Golkar
Running mate	Bahasan	Harti Hartidjah
Popular vote	203,211	50,656
Percentage	80.05%	19.95%
Mayor before election
Edi Suryanto (acting)
Independent
Elected mayor
Edi Rusdi Kamtono
Gerindra

The 2024 Pontianak mayoral election was held on 27 November 2024 as part of nationwide local elections to elect the mayor and vice mayor of Pontianak for a five-year term. The election was won by the Gerindra Party's Edi Rusdi Kamtono in a landslide with 80% of the vote. He defeated Mulyadi of Golkar, who received 19%.

== Electoral system ==
The election, like other local elections in 2024, follow the first-past-the-post system where the candidate with the most votes wins the election, even if they do not win a majority. It is possible for a candidate to run uncontested, in which case the candidate is still required to win a majority of votes "against" an "empty box" option. Should the candidate fail to do so, the election will be repeated on a later date.

== Candidates ==
According to electoral regulations, candidates were required to secure support from a political party or a coalition which had gained at least 8.5% of valid votes in the 2024 Pontianak City Regional House of Representatives election. Therefore PDI-P (13%), Gerindra (12%), Golkar (12%), NasDem (11%), PKS (10%), and Demokrat (9%) were eligible to nominate a candidate without forming coalitions with other political parties. Independent candidates were required to demonstrate support in form of photocopies of identity cards, which in Pontianak's case corresponds to 41,134. No independent candidates registered with the General Elections Commission by the deadline on 12 May 2024.

== Political map ==
Following the 2024 Indonesian general election, ten political parties are represented in the Pontianak City Regional House of Representatives:

#	Political parties	Amount		Seats	▲▼ (2019)
3	Indonesian Democratic Party of Struggle (PDI-P)	49,748	13.25%	7 / 45	▲1
2	Great Indonesia Movement Party (Gerindra)	48,549	12.94%	7 / 45	▲1
4	Party of Functional Groups (Golkar)	48,357	12.88%	6 / 45	▲3
5	NasDem Party (NasDem)	41,510	11.06%	5 / 45	▼1
8	Prosperous Justice Party (PKS)	39,131	10.43%	5 / 45	Steady
14	Democratic Party (Demokrat)	36,675	9.77%	4 / 45	▲1
17	United Development Party (PPP)	27,861	7.42%	3 / 45	▼1
1	National Awakening Party (PKB)	26,556	7.08%	4 / 45	▲1
10	People's Conscience Party (Hanura)	20,381	5.43%	2 / 45	▼1
12	National Mandate Party (PAN)	16,796	4.48%	2 / 45	▼1
15	Indonesian Solidarity Party (PSI)	6,076	1.62%	0 / 45	
24	Ummah Party (Ummat)	4,564	1.22%	0 / 45	
16	Perindo Party (Perindo)	3,528	0.94%	0 / 45	
13	Crescent Star Party (PBB)	2,076	0.55%	0 / 45	▼1
7	Indonesian People's Wave Party (Gelora)	1,455	0.39%	0 / 45	
6	Labour Party (Buruh)	992	0.26%	0 / 45	
9	Nusantara Awakening Party (PKN)	801	0.21%	0 / 45	
11	Change Indonesia Guardian Party (Garuda)	273	0.07%	0 / 45	
Jumlah		375,329	100.00%	45	

== Results ==
Candidate	Running mate	Party	Votes	%
Edi Rusdi Kamtono	Bahasan	Gerindra Party	203,211	80.05
Mulyadi	Harti Hartidjah	Golkar	50,656	19.95
Total			253,867	100.00
Valid votes			253,867	97.20
Invalid/blank votes			7,315	2.80
Total votes			261,182	100.00
Registered voters/turnout			489,208	53.39
Source: KPU
