= Teuku Riefky Harsya =

Indonesian politician (born 1972)

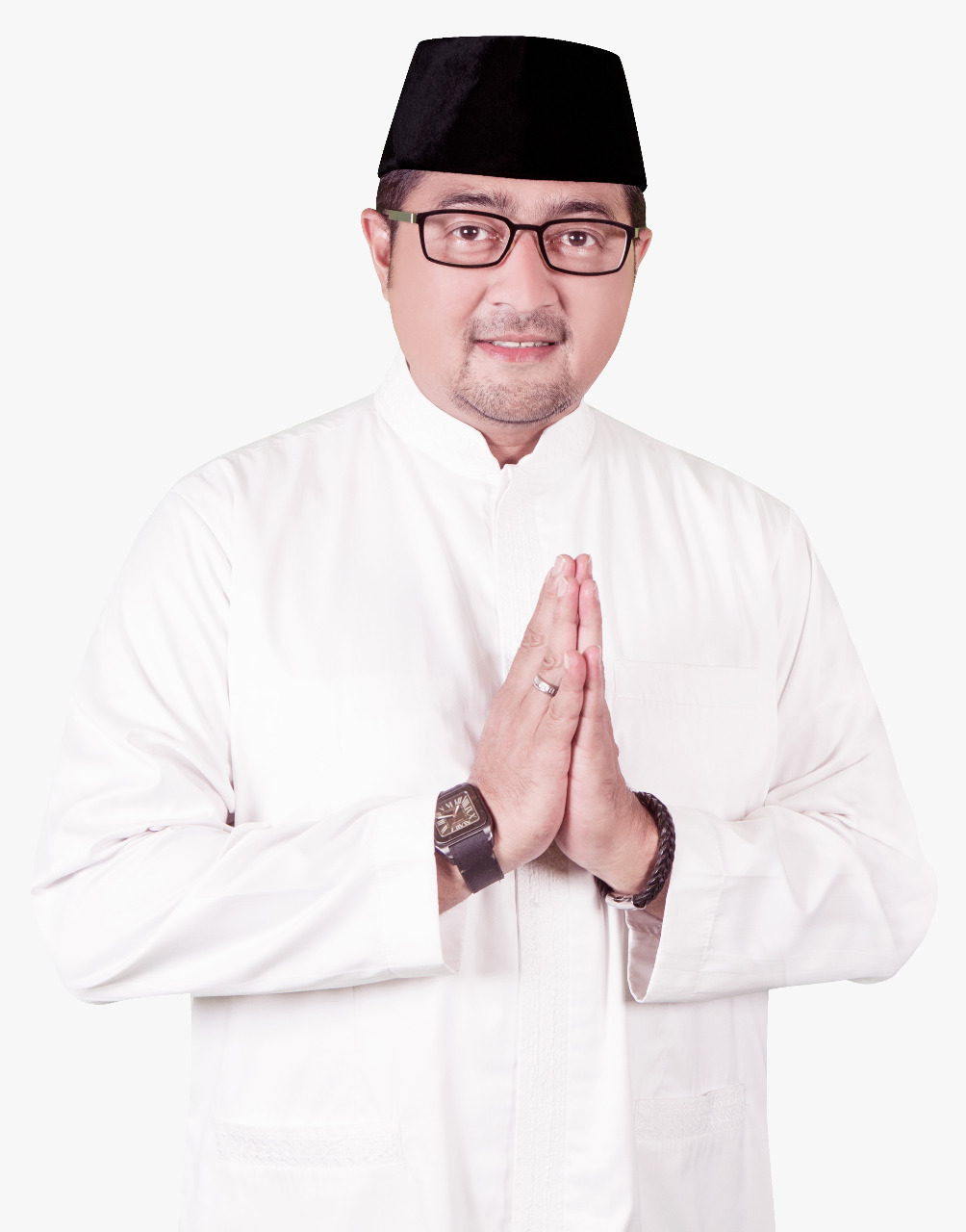

Minister of Creative Economy
- Incumbent
- Assumed office 21 October 2024
- President: Prabowo Subianto
- Deputy: Irene Umar
- Preceded by: Sandiaga Uno (as Minister of Tourism and Creative Economy)

head of Creative Economy Agency
- Incumbent
- Assumed office 21 October 2024
- President: Prabowo Subianto
- Deputy: Irene Umar
- Preceded by: Sandiaga Uno

Secretary-General Democratic Party
- In office 15 April 2020 – 23 March 2025
- Preceded by: Hinca Panjaitan
- Succeeded by: Herman Khaeron

Member of House of Representatives
- In office October 2005 – 21 October 2024; Interim replacement until 30 September 2009
- Preceded by: Rusli Ramli
- Succeeded by: Teuku Ibrahim
- Constituency: Aceh I

Personal details
- Born: 28 June 1972 (age 54) Jakarta, indonesia
- Party: Democratic Party
- Spouse: Adinda Yuanita
- Children: 5
- Education: Norwich University (BSc.); University of Indonesia (M.T.)

Teuku Riefky Harsya (born 28 June 1972) is an Indonesian politician serving as minister of creative economy since 2024. Since 2020, he served as general secretary of the Democratic Party.
