= February 2024 Indonesian local elections =

2024 Indonesian Provincial, Regency and City Regional House of Representatives election
- 14 February 2024
- All 2,372 seats in the 38 Provincial DPRD and 17,510 seats in the Regency and City DPRD
Party	Leader	Seats	+/–
PDI-P	Megawati Sukarnoputri	389	−29
Golkar	Airlangga Hartarto	365	+56
Gerindra	Prabowo Subianto	323	+35
NasDem	Surya Paloh	265	+79
PKB	Muhaimin Iskandar	220	+40
PKS	Ahmad Syaikhu	210	+19
Demokrat	Agus Harimurti Yudhoyono	206	−13
PAN	Zulkifli Hasan	160	−5
PPP	Muhamad Mardiono	83	−9
Hanura	Oesman Sapta Odang	42	−24
PSI	Kaesang Pangarep	33	+20
Perindo	Hary Tanoesoedibjo	31	+2
PA	Muzakir Manaf	20	+2
PBB	Yusril Ihza Mahendra	12	+5
PKN	Anas Urbaningrum	4	+4
Garuda	Ahmad Ridha Sabana	3	+1
PAS Aceh	Tu Bulqaini Tanjongan	3	+3
Gelora	Anis Matta	1	+1
PNA	Irwandi Yusuf	1	−5
PDA	Muhibbussabri A. Wahab	1	−2
This lists parties that won seats. See the complete results below.
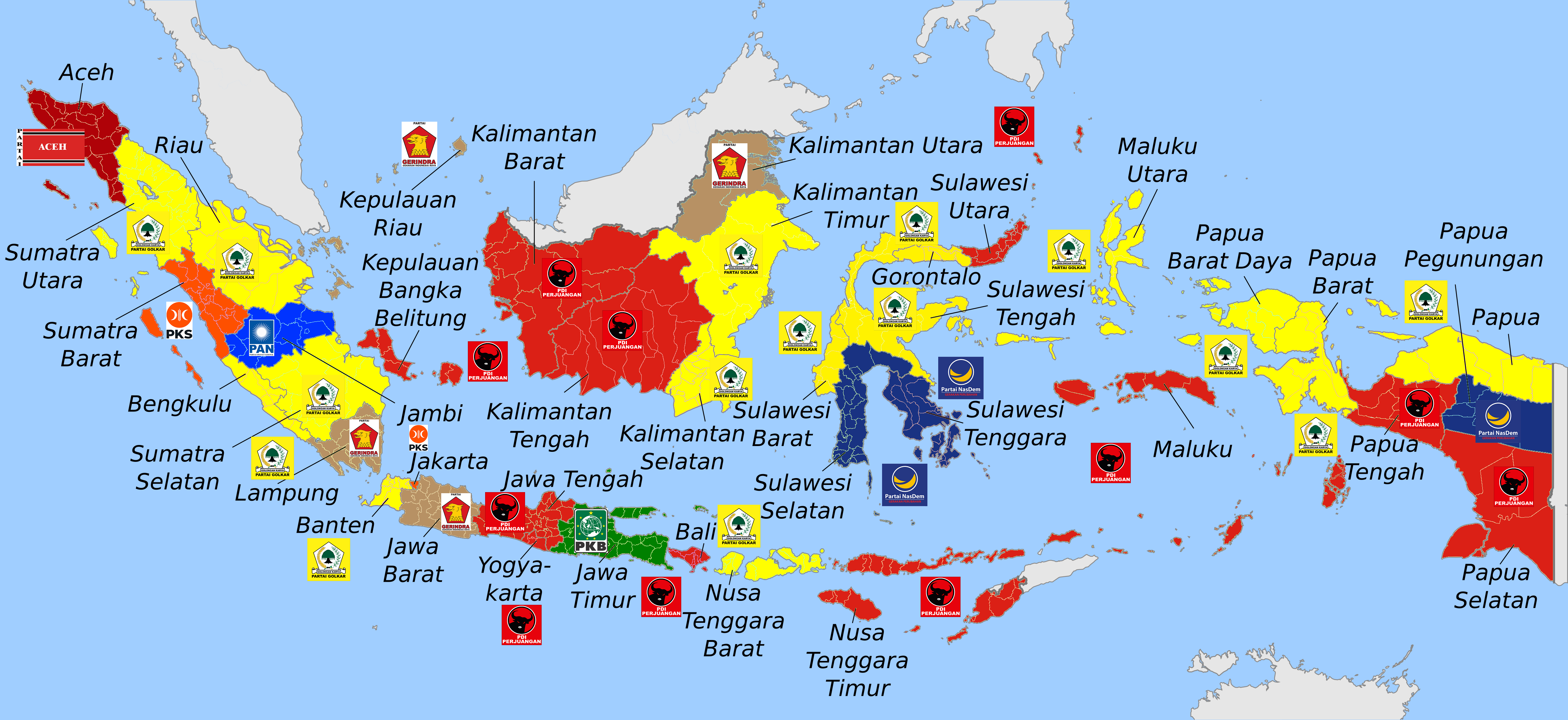
DPRD I speakership by province.
Map of the parties that won the most votes in each province for the election of members of the Provincial DPRD in the 2024 election.

Local elections were held across Indonesia's 38 provinces on 14 February 2024 to elect 2,372 members of the Provincial Regional House of Representatives (DPRD I) and 17,510 members of municipal legislatures (DPRD II). Eighteen political parties contested the election nationally, in addition to six regional parties contesting elections in Aceh. The election occurred as part of the general election, which also included elections for the president, members of the national House of Representatives (DPR), and members of the Regional Representative Council (DPD).

Elections were held in all 38 Indonesian provinces, along with 415 of Indonesia's 416 regencies and 93 of 98 cities. Constituent municipalities of Jakarta do not have legislative bodies below the Jakarta Regional House of Representatives. The elections are held under the open list proportional representation system with multi-member electoral districts, with the Sainte-Laguë method being used to allocate seats to parties. Unlike elections to the DPR, no parliamentary threshold applies in DPRD elections.

== All seats ==
The table below lists political parties by number of seats and DPRD speakerships won. The speaker of a DPRD is chosen by the party with the most seats, and in the event of a tie, the most votes of the tied parties.

Party	DPRD I (Provinces)		DPRD II (Regencies/Cities)	
Party	Seats	Speakers	Seats	Speakers
Indonesian Democratic Party of Struggle	389	12	2810	153
Golkar	365	14	2521	121
Gerindra Party	323	4	2120	43
National Awakening Party	220	1	1833	39
NasDem Party	265	3	1850	55
Prosperous Justice Party	210	2	1312	21
Democratic Party	206	0	1479	18
National Mandate Party	160	1	1236	27
United Development Party	83	0	849	11
Indonesian Solidarity Party	33	0	149	2
Perindo Party	31	0	349	4
Gelora Party	1	0	72	0
People's Conscience Party	42	0	486	4
Labour Party	0	0	11	0
Ummah Party	0	0	20	0
Crescent Star Party	12	0	164	2
Garuda Party	3	0	34	0
Nusantara Awakening Party	4	0	52	0
Aceh Party	20	1	116	7
Aceh Just and Prosperous Party	3	0	16	0
Nanggroe Aceh Party	1	0	21	1
Aceh Abode Party	1	0	7	0
Independent Solidity of the Acehnese Party	0	0	3	0
Total	2372	38	17510	508

== DPRD I ==
Obtained the seat of speaker of the provincial legislature due to the most seats and popular votes

Province	PKB	Gerindra	PDIP	Golkar	NasDem	Buruh	Gelora	PKS	PKN	Hanura	Garuda	PAN	PBB	Demokrat	PSI	Perindo	PPP	PNA	Gabthat	PDA	PA	PASA	SIRA	Ummat	Total
Aceh	9	5	1	9	10	0	0	4	0	0	0	5	0	7	0	0	5	1	0	1	20	4	0	0	81
North Sumatra	4	13	21	22	12	0	0	10	0	5	0	6	0	5	0	1	1	Did not participate (Acehnese parties)						0	100
West Sumatra	3	10	3	9	9	0	0	10	0	0	0	8	0	8	0	0	5	Did not participate (Acehnese parties)						0	65
Riau	6	8	11	10	6	0	0	10	0	0	0	5	0	8	0	0	1	Did not participate (Acehnese parties)						0	65
Jambi	6	6	6	7	5	0	0	5	0	0	0	10	0	5	0	0	5	Did not participate (Acehnese parties)						0	55
Bengkulu	3	6	6	10	4	0	0	2	0	3	0	6	0	4	0	0	1	Did not participate (Acehnese parties)						0	45
South Sumatra	7	11	9	12	10	0	0	7	1	1	0	6	0	8	0	1	2	Did not participate (Acehnese parties)						0	75
Riau Islands	2	9	4	9	7	0	0	6	0	1	0	2	0	3	1	1	0	Did not participate (Acehnese parties)						0	45
Bangka Belitung	2	7	9	8	6	0	0	6	0	0	0	0	1	3	0	0	3	Did not participate (Acehnese parties)						0	45
Lampung	11	16	13	11	10	0	0	7	0	0	0	8	0	9	0	0	0	Did not participate (Acehnese parties)						0	85
Banten	10	14	14	14	10	0	0	13	0	0	0	7	0	11	3	0	4	Did not participate (Acehnese parties)						0	100
Jakarta	10	14	15	10	11	0	0	18	0	0	0	10	0	8	8	1	1	Did not participate (Acehnese parties)						0	106
West Java	15	20	17	19	8	0	0	19	0	0	0	7	0	8	1	0	6	Did not participate (Acehnese parties)						0	120
Central Java	20	17	33	17	3	0	0	11	0	0	0	4	0	7	2	0	6	Did not participate (Acehnese parties)						0	120
Yogyakarta	6	8	19	6	2	0	0	7	0	0	0	5	0	0	1	0	1	Did not participate (Acehnese parties)						0	55
East Java	27	21	21	15	10	0	0	5	0	0	0	5	0	11	1	0	4	Did not participate (Acehnese parties)						0	120
Bali	0	10	32	7	2	0	0	0	0	0	0	0	0	3	1	0	0	Did not participate (Acehnese parties)						0	55
NTB	6	10	4	10	4	0	0	8	0	1	0	4	2	6	0	3	7	Did not participate (Acehnese parties)						0	65
NTT	7	9	9	9	8	0	0	1	0	4	0	4	0	7	6	1	0	Did not participate (Acehnese parties)						0	65
West Kalimantan	5	9	13	9	10	0	0	2	0	4	0	5	0	6	0	0	2	Did not participate (Acehnese parties)						0	65
Central Kalimantan	4	6	10	8	5	0	0	1	0	0	0	4	0	6	0	1	0	Did not participate (Acehnese parties)						0	45
South Kalimantan	6	7	3	13	10	0	0	6	0	0	0	6	0	3	0	0	1	Did not participate (Acehnese parties)						0	55
East Kalimantan	6	10	9	15	3	0	0	4	0	0	0	4	0	2	0	0	2	Did not participate (Acehnese parties)						0	55
North Kalimantan	2	6	3	6	2	0	0	4	0	3	0	2	0	6	0	0	1	Did not participate (Acehnese parties)						0	35
South Sulawesi	8	13	6	14	17	0	0	7	0	1	0	4	0	7	0	0	8	Did not participate (Acehnese parties)						0	85
West Sulawesi	3	5	5	10	5	0	0	1	0	2	0	5	0	8	0	0	1	Did not participate (Acehnese parties)						0	45
Southeast Sulawesi	3	5	6	6	6	0	0	4	0	1	0	3	4	4	0	0	3	Did not participate (Acehnese parties)						0	45
Central Sulawesi	5	7	7	8	8	0	0	5	0	1	0	2	1	8	0	2	1	Did not participate (Acehnese parties)						0	55
Gorontalo	1	6	7	8	7	0	0	5	0	1	0	3	0	3	0	0	4	Did not participate (Acehnese parties)						0	45
North Sulawesi	1	4	19	6	6	0	0	1	0	0	0	0	0	6	1	1	0	Did not participate (Acehnese parties)						0	45
North Maluku	4	4	5	8	5	0	0	5	0	5	1	3	1	3	0	1	0	Did not participate (Acehnese parties)						0	45
Maluku	4	5	8	4	6	0	0	4	0	3	0	3	0	4	0	2	2	Did not participate (Acehnese parties)						0	45
West Papua	3	3	7	7	5	0	0	1	0	0	0	3	0	3	0	2	1	Did not participate (Acehnese parties)						0	35
Papua	3	3	7	10	7	0	0	3	0	0	0	3	0	3	2	3	1	Did not participate (Acehnese parties)						0	45
Central Papua	3	4	11	3	5	0	0	2	1	3	1	3	2	2	2	2	1	Did not participate (Acehnese parties)						0	45
Highland Papua	1	3	4	3	11	0	1	5	2	0	1	2	1	5	2	4	0	Did not participate (Acehnese parties)						0	45
Southwest Papua	1	3	5	8	4	0	0	1	0	3	0	1	0	5	1	3	0	Did not participate (Acehnese parties)						0	35
South Papua	3	5	7	4	6	0	0	3	0	0	0	1	0	1	1	2	2	Did not participate (Acehnese parties)						0	35
Total seats	220	323	389	365	265	0	1	210	4	42	3	160	12	206	33	31	83	1	0	1	20	3	0	0	2372

== DPRD II ==
Province	PKB	Gerindra	PDIP	Golkar	NasDem	Buruh	Gelora	PKS	PKN	Hanura	Garuda	PAN	PBB	Demokrat	PSI	Perindo	PPP	PNA	Gabthat	PDA	PA	PASA	SIRA	Ummat	Total
Aceh	53	59	8	89	69	0	3	48	0	21	1	57	7	59	0	0	27	21	0	7	116	16	3	1	665
North Sumatra	58	133	182	207	140	0	5	56	4	65	1	84	14	94	10	43	29	Did not participate (Acehnese parties)						0	1125
Bengkulu	19	32	29	39	33	0	2	17	0	11	0	35	4	17	0	21	16	Did not participate (Acehnese parties)						0	275
Jambi	34	41	40	52	44	0	0	27	3	4	0	57	1	32	0	8	32	Did not participate (Acehnese parties)						0	375
Riau	47	62	75	69	55	0	0	46	0	8	0	45	2	54	4	9	18	Did not participate (Acehnese parties)						1	495
West Sumatra	48	67	26	82	77	0	0	73	0	12	0	72	9	68	1	4	47	Did not participate (Acehnese parties)						4	590
South Sumatra	62	92	83	85	69	0	0	46	5	25	1	71	8	67	0	7	24	Did not participate (Acehnese parties)						0	645
Lampung	78	91	98	83	71	1	0	47	0	2	0	52	0	61	0	3	13	Did not participate (Acehnese parties)						0	600
Bangka Belitung	15	27	41	26	24	0	0	16	0	6	0	7	8	18	2	4	11	Did not participate (Acehnese parties)						0	205
Riau Islands	12	23	26	32	36	0	0	18	1	9	0	11	2	19	1	3	7	Did not participate (Acehnese parties)						0	200
Banten	39	50	46	67	40	0	1	48	0	0	0	23	0	39	8	1	28	Did not participate (Acehnese parties)						0	390
West Java	162	187	200	207	88	2	0	180	0	6	0	82	3	97	8	1	72	Did not participate (Acehnese parties)						0	1295
Central Java	265	193	444	194	75	0	1	138	0	22	0	68	0	89	10	3	108	Did not participate (Acehnese parties)						0	1610
Yogyakarta	27	28	57	28	16	0	0	27	0	0	0	20	0	5	0	0	11	Did not participate (Acehnese parties)						1	220
East Java	337	218	307	215	134	0	5	103	0	27	0	74	11	144	11	7	101	Did not participate (Acehnese parties)						1	1695
Bali	3	47	191	60	17	0	1	0	0	6	0	0	0	26	4	3	2	Did not participate (Acehnese parties)						0	360
West Nusa Tenggara	33	46	27	52	43	0	9	41	0	9	0	34	10	34	0	11	35	Did not participate (Acehnese parties)						1	385
East Nusa Tenggara	76	73	82	80	87	0	4	14	1	45	2	48	3	58	28	45	4	Did not participate (Acehnese parties)						0	650
West Kalimantan	39	67	85	68	68	0	2	27	0	29	0	47	0	51	3	8	16	Did not participate (Acehnese parties)						0	510
Central Kalimantan	37	48	80	66	36	0	0	10	0	10	0	27	1	34	3	16	17	Did not participate (Acehnese parties)						0	385
South Kalimantan	44	58	46	80	48	0	2	41	0	2	0	46	3	28	0	0	32	Did not participate (Acehnese parties)						0	430
East Kalimantan	32	47	47	69	36	0	4	27	0	8	0	18	1	27	0	3	11	Did not participate (Acehnese parties)						0	330
North Kalimantan	9	14	13	14	11	0	0	11	0	15	0	9	1	19	2	1	6	Did not participate (Acehnese parties)						0	125
South Sulawesi	69	102	58	138	142	0	10	58	0	20	0	74	3	69	2	10	69	Did not participate (Acehnese parties)						1	825
West Sulawesi	14	16	19	27	23	0	2	8	1	7	0	15	1	24	1	3	9	Did not participate (Acehnese parties)						0	170
Southeast Sulawesi	36	48	74	58	59	0	0	33	5	16	0	36	20	37	1	5	12	Did not participate (Acehnese parties)						0	440
Central Sulawesi	33	48	42	59	55	0	0	25	0	17	0	19	12	40	2	20	8	Did not participate (Acehnese parties)						0	380
Gorontalo	6	22	20	34	30	0	2	9	0	6	0	10	0	11	0	1	19	Did not participate (Acehnese parties)						0	170
North Sulawesi	17	38	153	61	46	0	0	6	0	5	0	5	1	38	3	19	8	Did not participate (Acehnese parties)						0	400
Maluku	31	26	38	27	35	1	1	25	4	16	0	20	2	22	8	18	16	Did not participate (Acehnese parties)						0	290
North Maluku	26	25	37	34	24	0	4	14	1	12	3	15	5	25	6	10	4	Did not participate (Acehnese parties)						0	245
Papua	17	15	24	33	24	1	6	11	5	11	1	12	6	14	8	13	11	Did not participate (Acehnese parties)						3	215
West Papua	9	20	21	18	17	1	0	9	0	5	2	12	3	5	5	13	9	Did not participate (Acehnese parties)						1	150
Southwest Papua	11	11	16	23	18	1	1	15	0	8	3	6	1	16	1	3	1	Did not participate (Acehnese parties)						0	135
Central Papua	12	19	27	20	16	1	3	9	9	14	7	12	11	11	9	16	10	Did not participate (Acehnese parties)						4	210
Highland Papua	13	16	28	13	29	3	3	21	13	6	12	8	9	21	6	15	2	Did not participate (Acehnese parties)						2	220
South Papua	10	11	20	12	14	0	1	8	0	1	1	5	2	6	2	2	5	Did not participate (Acehnese parties)						0	100
Total seats	1833	2120	2810	2521	1849	11	72	1312	52	486	34	1236	164	1479	149	349	850	21	0	7	116	16	3	20	17510

Obtained the seat of speaker of the municipal legislature due to the most seats and popular votes

=== Aceh ===
Regency/City	PKB	Gerindra	PDIP	Golkar	Nasdem	Buruh	Gelora	PKS	PKN	Hanura	Garuda	PAN	PBB	Demokrat	PSI	Perindo	PPP	PNA	Gabthat	PDA	PA	PASA	SIRA	Ummat	Total	Src.
West Aceh		4		5	2			1				5		2				1			5				25	
Southwest Aceh	3	4		3	2		1					2		3			1	2		1	3				25	
Aceh Besar	6	1		3	3			4				7	1	5			2			1	7				40	
Aceh Jaya	2	2		2								2		2				2		1	7				20	
South Aceh	2	1		3	4		1	1				4		3			1	5			5				30	
Aceh Singkil	3	3	1	3	4			2		3		1		2			2	1							25	
Aceh Tamiang		5		4	5			3				3		5			3	2			5				35	
Central Aceh	2	4	2	5	5			4		1		1	1	2			2							1	30	
Southeast Aceh	1	2	2	9	1			1		4		6		3							1				30	
East Aceh	5	5		3	5			1						3			2				13	3			40	
North Aceh	3	2		4	3			1			1	2		2						3	17	5	2		45	
Bener Meriah	3	3		4	4			2		3		1		2				2			1				25	
Bireuen	7			9	5			4				1		2			2	1			6	3			40	
Gayo Lues	4	2	1	6	3		1	1					1	4			1	1							25	
Nagan Raya	1	1	1	4	3			1						3			4	1			4	1	1		25	
Pidie	4	5		4	4			1				3		4						1	11	3			40	
Pidie Jaya	2	2		1	1							2		2			2				12	1			25	
Simeulue	1	1	1	2	2			4		2		3	1				2				1				20	
Banda Aceh	1	4		3	5			5				5		5			2								30	
Langsa		3		3	1			4		2		5		2				1			4				25	
Lhokseumawe	2	2		4	5			3				1					1	2			5				25	
Sabang				1				4				2	3	3							7				20	
Subulussalam	1	3		4	2			1		6		1									2				20	
Total seats	53	59	8	89	69	0	3	48	0	21	1	57	7	59	0	0	27	21	0	7	116	16	3	1	665	

=== North Sumatra ===
Regency/City	PKB	Gerindra	PDIP	Golkar	Nasdem	Buruh	Gelora	PKS	PKN	Hanura	Garuda	PAN	PBB	Demokrat	PSI	Perindo	PPP	Ummat	Total	Src.
Asahan		8	8	10	3			2		2		5		5			2		45	
Batubara	3	6	10	3	2			4		1		4		3		1	3		40	
Dairi		4	7	9	3			1		2				6	2	1			35	
Deli Serdang	3	7	7	7	7			5		2		3	1	4		1	3		50	
Humbang Hasundutan	1	3	2	9	4					5		1		1	1	3			30	
Karo	2	5	10	4	5		3	1		2		3		4		1			40	
Labuhanbatu	3	5	4	6	9		1	1		3		2	2	4		3	2		45	
South Labuhanbatu	2	4	3	5	3			1		4		4		2		5	2		35	
North Labuhanbatu	4	1	4	9	2			2		6		3	1	2		1			35	
Langkat	1	6	7	10	8			4				7	3	2			2		50	
Mandailing Natal	5	7	1	6	5			4		2		3		5		1	1		40	
Nias		2	9	5	2					2		1		2	1	1			25	
West Nias	1	6	2	2	1					5				2		1			20	
South Nias	2	3	9	5	5					1	1	5		4					35	
North Nias		1	2	3	3					3		13							25	
Padang Lawas	3	6	1	5	2			3		2		3		3			2		30	
North Padang Lawas	1	2	4	9	1					1		3	5	2		2			30	
Pakpak Bharat	2	2	3	6				1		1		2		2			1		20	
Samosir	6	2	5	4	5									2		1			25	
Serdang Bedagai	5	5	15	5	2			2		2		1		3			5		45	
Simalungun		7	8	15	6		1	1		2				5		4	1		50	
South Tapanuli	1	5	2	8	4			1	2	3		5		1	1		2		35	
Central Tapanuli	1	4	4	5	17							2		2					35	
North Tapanuli	3	2	10	4	5					2				3		6			35	
Toba	3	4	8	6	4									2	1	2			30	
Binjai		4	5	6	4			6				3		6			1		35	
Gunungsitoli		3	5	3	4				2	3		1		2		2			25	
Medan	2	6	9	6	5			8		2		3		4	4	1			50	
Padangsidempuan	1	2	3	10	2			2		2		2	1	3		2			30	
Pematangsiantar		3	7	5	4			2		2		3		3		1			30	
Sibolga		3	2	4	8			1					1	1					20	
Tanjungbalai	3	2	3	8	1			2		1		1		2		1	1		25	
Tebing Tinggi		3	3	5	4			2		2		1		2		2	1		25	
Total seats	58	133	182	207	140	0	5	56	4	65	1	84	14	94	10	43	29	0	1125	

=== Bengkulu ===
Regency/City	PKB	Gerindra	PDIP	Golkar	Nasdem	Buruh	Gelora	PKS	PKN	Hanura	Garuda	PAN	PBB	Demokrat	PSI	Perindo	PPP	Ummat	Total	Src.
South Bengkulu		3	3	3	4			1		2		2		3		2	2		25	
Central Bengkulu		3	3	3	3			2		2		3				3	3		25	
North Bengkulu	2	4	7	5	3			2				3		2		1	1		30	
Kaur	2	3	3	4	3			1		1		2	3	1		1	1		25	
Kepahiang	1	3	3	5	5			1						2		5			25	
Lebong	3	2	1	3	2							8	1	3		2			25	
Mukomuko	3	3	1	5	2					3		2		1		3	2		25	
Rejang Lebong	3	5	4	4	4			3				5		1		1			30	
Seluma	2	2	3	4	3		2	3				3		1		1	6		30	
Bengkulu City	3	4	1	3	4			4		3		7		3		2	1		35	
Total seats	19	32	29	39	33	0	2	17	0	11	0	35	4	17	0	21	16	0	275	

=== Jambi ===
Regency/City	PKB	Gerindra	PDIP	Golkar	Nasdem	Buruh	Gelora	PKS	PKN	Hanura	Garuda	PAN	PBB	Demokrat	PSI	Perindo	PPP	Ummat	Total	Src.
Batanghari	4	2	4	3	5			2				4		2			9		35	
Bungo	4	5	3	3	7			1		1		4		6			1		35	
Kerinci	2	5	2	4	4			3		1		3		3		1	2		30	
Merangin	3	4	2	4	4			2	1	1		5		3		3	3		35	
Muaro Jambi	5	4	4	5	4			2				5		4		2	5		40	
Sarolangun	3	3	3	4	1			3	2			4		2			5		30	
West Tanjung Jabung	3	4	7	4	5			2				6	1	2			1		35	
East Tanjung Jabung	1	3	2	4	3			1				15		1					30	
Tebo	4	3	5	8	3			3				4		4			1		35	
Jambi City	4	6	5	8	6			4				5		3		2	2		45	
Sungai Penuh	1	2	3	5	2			3		1		3		2			3		25	
Total seats	34	41	40	52	44	0	0	26	3	4	0	58	1	32	0	8	32	0	375	

=== Riau ===
Regency/City	PKB	Gerindra	PDIP	Golkar	Nasdem	Buruh	Gelora	PKS	PKN	Hanura	Garuda	PAN	PBB	Demokrat	PSI	Perindo	PPP	Ummat	Total	Src.
Bengkalis	6	4	10	3	6			5				3	2	2		3	1		45	
Indragiri Hilir	7	6	5	6	5			2				1		6		1	6		45	
Indragiri Hulu	5	3	4	5	7			3				4		5		2	1	1	40	
Kampar	4	8	4	7	5			3				5		5			4		45	
Meranti Islands	3	3	5	3	3			3				5		2	1		2		30	
Kuantan Singingi	3	9	5	5	3			2				3		5					35	
Pelalawan	5	3	12	6	1			4		2		4		3					40	
Rokan Hilir	4	4	6	10	5			5		2		2		6	1				45	
Rokan Hulu	3	6	8	6	4			3		1		4		7	2		1		45	
Siak	4	4	4	8	4			4		1		6		2		2	1		40	
Dumai	1	5	5	5	7			4				2		3		1	2		35	
Pekanbaru	2	7	7	5	5			8		2		6		8					50	
Total seats	47	62	75	69	55	0	0	46	0	8	0	45	2	54	4	9	18	1	495	

=== West Sumatra ===
Regency/City	PKB	Gerindra	PDIP	Golkar	Nasdem	Buruh	Gelora	PKS	PKN	Hanura	Garuda	PAN	PBB	Demokrat	PSI	Perindo	PPP	Ummat	Total	Src.
Agam	1	5		4	6			9		1		7	1	6			5		45	
Dharmasraya	4	4	6	5	2					1		5		2			1		30	
Mentawai Islands		3	4	1	4					1				4	1	2			20	
Lima Puluh Kota	3	4	1	5	5			5		1		3		5			3		35	
Padang Pariaman	5	5	1	5	5			4				7		4			4		40	
Pasaman	5	3		5	5			6				3		6			2		35	
West Pasaman	4	4	4	5	4			5		1		5		4			3	1	40	
South Pesisir	6	5	3	5	5			5				5	1	5		1	4		45	
Sijunjung	3	3	1	6	2			4		1		3	1	2		1	3		30	
Solok		4	1	5	5			5		3		6		4			2		35	
South Solok	2	3	1	8	4			2				1		3			1		25	
Tanah Datar	3	4	1	5	4			4		1		4		4			3	2	35	
Bukittinggi	2	4		3	4			5				2		3			2		25	
Padang	4	7	3	5	7			7				5		4			2	1	45	
Padang Panjang	1	3		2	4			2				4	2	2					20	
Pariaman		2		3	2			3				3	1	3			3		20	
Payakumbuh	3	1		4	4			3				3	1	3			3		25	
Sawahlunto	2	1		3	2			2				4		2			4		20	
Solok City		2		3	3			2		2		2	2	2			2		20	
Total seats	48	67	26	82	77	0	0	73	0	12	0	72	9	68	1	4	47	4	590	

=== South Sumatra ===
Regency/City	PKB	Gerindra	PDIP	Golkar	Nasdem	Buruh	Gelora	PKS	PKN	Hanura	Garuda	PAN	PBB	Demokrat	PSI	Perindo	PPP	Ummat	Total	Src.
Banyuasin	5	8	7	7	6			5		1		1		5					45	
Empat Lawang	2	2	7	3				1				15		5					35	
Lahat	5	5	5	5	3					1		4	1	8		1	2		40	
Muara Enim	4	7	5	6	4			4		1		5		3		1	5		45	
Musi Banyuasin	6	7	6	10	5			3	4	1		2				1			45	
Musi Rawas	2	6	7	7	5			5				4	1	3					40	
North Musi Rawas	2	2	4	2	4			1		3		3	1	3					25	
Ogan Ilir	2	12	6	1	5			5		2		2		2			3		40	
Ogan Komering Ilir	7	6	6	6	4			2		4		4		6					45	
Ogan Komering Ulu	3	4	2	2	4			1	1	3		8		2		2	3		35	
South Ogan Komering Ulu	4	4	3	6	3			1		2	1	3	1	7		1	4		40	
East Ogan Komering Ulu	8	6	4	5	7			3		2		4		4		1	1		45	
Penukal Abab Lematang Ilir	1	2	5	4	1			2		1		7	2	4			1		30	
Lubuklinggau	4	5	4	6	5			3		1			1	1					30	
Pagar Alam	3	3	3	3	4			1		1		2		3			2		25	
Palembang	4	8	5	8	9			5				5		6					50	
Prabumulih		5	4	4	1			4		2		2	1	5			2		30	
Total seats	62	92	83	85	70	0	0	46	5	25	1	71	8	67	0	7	23	0	645	

=== Lampung ===
Regency/City	PKB	Gerindra	PDIP	Golkar	Nasdem	Buruh	Gelora	PKS	PKN	Hanura	Garuda	PAN	PBB	Demokrat	PSI	Perindo	PPP	Ummat	Total	Src.
West Lampung	4	2	14	4	1			3				2		5					35	
South Lampung	6	9	8	7	5			4				6		5					50	
Central Lampung	8	8	5	13	4			5				3		4					50	
East Lampung	12	8	8	8	7			3				1		3					50	
North Lampung	5	8	5	5	7			5				5		5					45	
Mesuji	5	3	4	5	5			1				2		3			2		30	
Pesawaran	5	7	6	4	6			2				4		3			3		40	
West Pesisir	3	1	4	3	6			1				2		1			4		25	
Pringsewu	5	5	5	7	4			5				4		4			1		40	
Tanggamus	7	8	10	4	4			2				7					3		45	
Tulang Bawang	4	9	8	7	1			2				6		3					40	
West Tulang Bawang	2	5	6	1	5	1				2		3		7		3			35	
Way Kanan	4	6	4	5	5			3				3		10					40	
Bandar Lampung	5	10	6	6	7			7				4		5					50	
Metro	3	2	5	4	4			4						3					25	
Total seats	78	91	98	83	71	1	0	47	0	2	0	52	0	61	0	3	13	0	600	

=== Bangka Belitung ===
Regency/City	PKB	Gerindra	PDIP	Golkar	Nasdem	Buruh	Gelora	PKS	PKN	Hanura	Garuda	PAN	PBB	Demokrat	PSI	Perindo	PPP	Ummat	Total	Src.
Bangka	3	4	9	4	4			3						5		1	2		35	
West Bangka	1	5	6	3	4			4		1		1	2	1		1	1		30	
South Bangka	3	4	6	3	3			2				2	1	4		1	1		30	
Central Bangka	3	4	6	6	3			2				1		2			3		30	
Belitung	3	3	4	2	3			1		3		1	1	1	2		1		25	
East Belitung	1	2	5	3	2			2		2		1	4	1		1	1		25	
Pangkalpinang	1	5	5	5	5			2				1		4			2		30	
Total seats	15	27	41	26	24	0	0	16	0	6	0	7	8	18	2	4	11	0	205	

=== Riau Islands ===
Regency/City	PKB	Gerindra	PDIP	Golkar	Nasdem	Buruh	Gelora	PKS	PKN	Hanura	Garuda	PAN	PBB	Demokrat	PSI	Perindo	PPP	Ummat	Total	Src.
Bintan		3	2	7	3			3				1		6					25	
Karimun	3	4	3	6	3			3		4		2		2					30	
Anambas Islands	1	2	2	2	2			1				1	2	2		1	4		20	
Lingga	1	1	2	4	11			1						3		2			25	
Natuna		2	4	3	3			2		1		2		2			1		20	
Batam	4	7	7	6	10			6	1	2		3		2	1		1		50	
Tanjungpinang	3	4	6	4	4			2		2		2		2			1		30	
Total seats	12	23	26	32	36	0	0	18	1	9	0	11	2	19	1	3	7	0	200	

=== Banten ===
Regency/City	PKB	Gerindra	PDIP	Golkar	Nasdem	Buruh	Gelora	PKS	PKN	Hanura	Garuda	PAN	PBB	Demokrat	PSI	Perindo	PPP	Ummat	Total	Src.
Lebak	7	6	7	6	7			5						6		1	5		50	
Pandeglang	6	7	6	7	7			6						6			5		50	
Serang	5	7	5	11	5			6				4		4			3		50	
Tangerang	6	6	9	9	5			6				5		6			3		55	
Cilegon	1	7	1	8	4		1	4				6		3			5		40	
Serang City	4	5	4	6	6			6				4		6			4		45	
Tangerang City	5	6	7	9	5			6				2		4	4		2		50	
South Tangerang	5	6	7	11	1			9				2		4	4		1		50	
Total seats	39	50	46	67	40	0	1	48	0	0	0	23	0	39	8	1	28	0	390	

=== West Java ===
Regency/City	PKB	Gerindra	PDIP	Golkar	Nasdem	Buruh	Gelora	PKS	PKN	Hanura	Garuda	PAN	PBB	Demokrat	PSI	Perindo	PPP	Ummat	Total	Src.
Bandung	12	6	4	9	6			7				4		7					55	
West Bandung	6	8	5	8	5			8				5		5					50	
Bekasi	7	8	8	10	3	2		7				3	1	4			2		55	
Bogor	6	12	5	7	4			7				2		6			6		55	
Ciamis	5	6	7	5	4			5				7	1	6			4		50	
Cianjur	6	7	6	10	6			5				4		5			1		50	
Cirebon	9	7	13	7	4			6						4					50	
Garut	8	7	4	8	3			7				2		4			7		50	
Indramayu	10	6	12	14	2			3						2		1			50	
Karawang	6	8	6	6	7			7				2		8					50	
Kuningan	8	6	9	7	3			7				3		3			4		50	
Majalengka	6	5	15	7				7				5		1			4		50	
Pangandaran	5	5	16	5				3				4					2		40	
Purwakarta	5	10	6	9	7			5		2		1		3			2		50	
Subang	6	8	9	10	7			4				3		2			1		50	
Sukabumi	7	7	6	10				7				3		5			5		50	
Sumedang	6	7	8	10				7				4		1			7		50	
Tasikmalaya	8	9	9	7	1			3				4		3			6		50	
Bandung City	5	7	7	7	6			11						3	4				50	
Banjar City	3	4	6	7	1			3		2		1		1			2		30	
Bekasi City	5	6	9	8				11				5		2	2		2		50	
Bogor City	4	6	6	7	4			11				5		3	1		3		50	
Cimahi	4	5	6	7	5			9				2		6			1		45	
Cirebon City	3	5	4	6	5			4		1		4		2			1		35	
Depok	5	8	6	7	1			13				2		5	1		2		50	
Sukabumi City	2	4	4	4	3			8		1		3		3			3		35	
Tasikmalaya City	5	10	4	5	1			5				4	1	3			7		45	
Total seats	162	187	200	207	88	2	0	180	0	6	0	82	3	97	8	1	72	0	1295	

=== Central Java ===
Regency/City	PKB	Gerindra	PDIP	Golkar	Nasdem	Buruh	Gelora	PKS	PKN	Hanura	Garuda	PAN	PBB	Demokrat	PSI	Perindo	PPP	Ummat	Total	Src.
Banjarnegara	7	4	7	7	3			5		2		4		8			3		50	
Banyumas	9	7	17	5	1			6				2		2			1		50	
Batang	11	5	7	6	1		1	4		2		1		2			5		45	
Blora	11	8	8	5	5			3		1				3		1	3		45	
Boyolali	3	3	36	4				4											50	
Brebes	5	6	12	7	1			4				4		3			3		45	
Cilacap	8	7	10	7	5			5				3		2			3		50	
Demak	12	8	11	8	5									3			3		50	
Grobogan	8	8	16	3	1			3		4				3			4		50	
Jepara	7	8	8	4	7			2				2		2			10	-	50	
Karanganyar	5	4	15	9				5				2		5					45	
Kebumen	11	7	11	3	8			2				3		1			4		50	
Kendal	11	7	7	8	2			4				4		1		1	5		50	
Klaten	4	6	18	7	1			6				3		3			2		50	
Kudus	7	7	9	4	3			4		2		3		3			3		45	
Magelang	12	7	15	4				6						1			5		50	
Pati	6	6	14	5	3			5						5			6		50	
Pekalongan	14	4	8	9				2				4					4		45	
Pemalang	11	7	12	7				5				1					7		50	
Purbalingga	9	6	14	6	1			7				3		2			2		50	
Purworejo	6	5	9	8	4			1				1		7			4		45	
Rembang	8	1	7	1	7					5		1		7			8		45	
Semarang	5	4	18	4	5			4		1		2		1			6		50	
Sragen	6	6	15	7	2			5				4		5					50	
Sukoharjo	3	6	21	6	1			5				3							45	
Tegal	17	8	10	7				4				1					3		50	
Temanggung	7	5	9	6	2			3		2		5		1			5		45	
Wonogiri	2	4	27	7				5				3		2					50	
Wonosobo	10	6	13	4	3					1				5		1	2		45	
Magelang City	4	3	7	3				3		2				3					25	
Pekalongan City	7	1	4	9	2			4				3					5		35	
Salatiga	5	4	8		1			4						3					25	
Semarang City	5	7	14	4	1			6				1		6	5		1		50	
Surakarta	2	5	20	3				7				3			5				45	
Tegal City	4	4	7	7				5				2					1		30	
Total seats	265	193	444	194	75	0	1	138	0	22	0	68	0	89	10	3	108	0	1610	

=== Yogyakarta Special Region ===
Regency/City	PKB	Gerindra	PDIP	Golkar	Nasdem	Buruh	Gelora	PKS	PKN	Hanura	Garuda	PAN	PBB	Demokrat	PSI	Perindo	PPP	Ummat	Total	Src.
Bantul	7	6	12	6				6				2		3			2	1	45	
Gunungkidul	6	5	8	6	8			5				5		2					45	
Kulon Progo	5	6	13	5	1			5				3					2		40	
Sleman	7	6	13	6	3			6				6					3		50	
Yogyakarta	2	5	11	5	4			5				4					4		40	
Total seats	27	28	57	28	16	0	0	27	0	0	0	20	0	5	0	0	11	1	220	

=== East Java ===
Regency/City	PKB	Gerindra	PDIP	Golkar	Nasdem	Buruh	Gelora	PKS	PKN	Hanura	Garuda	PAN	PBB	Demokrat	PSI	Perindo	PPP	Ummat	Total	Src.
Bangkalan	9	6	7	5	4		1			2		5		4		1	6		50	
Banyuwangi	9	6	11	7	7									7			3		50	
Blitar	11	7	16	5	3							5		2			1		50	
Bojonegoro	13	8	6	5	1			2		2		3	2	5			3		50	
Bondowoso	16	4	5	7			1	2						3			7		45	
Gresik	14	10	9	6	2							3		3			3		50	
Jember	8	10	8	6				6				1		6			5		50	
Jombang	12	8	10	5	2			3						6			4		50	
Kediri	9	6	13	6	4			3				5		4					50	
Lamongan	12	6	7	8	3			1				5		4		1	2	1	50	
Lumajang	10	11	9	4	3			2						4			7		50	
Madiun	6	6	8	8	5			4		2				6					45	
Magetan	8	6	6	5	4			5				5		5			1		45	
Malang	11	8	13	8	6			2		1				1					50	
Mojokerto	10	4	6	5	8			4				3		5		1	4		50	
Nganjuk	9	6	10	4	5			2		6				6			2		50	
Ngawi	6	6	20	5				3		1		2		2					45	
Pacitan	5	1	6	7	2			2		2				18			2		45	
Pamekasan	6	2	2	3	4		2	4				1	7	7			7		45	
Pasuruan	14	12	8	6	2		1	4						2			1		50	
Ponorogo	8	6	7	5	7			3				3		5			1		45	
Probolinggo	9	9	7	10	8			1									6		50	
Sampang	5	3	4	1	15			4		1		3	1	2			6		45	
Sidoarjo	15	9	9	5	2			3				4		2			1		50	
Situbondo	13	6	5	5	2			1		1				3			9		45	
Sumenep	10	3	11		5			2		1		5	1	6			6		50	
Trenggalek	11	4	13	5				6		2		1		3					45	
Tuban	11	4	5	20	4							1		3			2		50	
Tulungagung	9	8	12	5	6			2		2		2		3			1		50	
Batu	6	4	6	4	2			5				2		1					30	
Blitar City	5	2	8	3								3		1			3		25	
Kediri City	3	4	3	5	4			2		2		5		2					30	
Madiun City	3	2	4	3	2			4						4	4	4			30	
Malang City	8	6	9	6	3			7				1		3	2				45	
Mojokerto City	4	2	5	2	3			3				2		3			1		25	
Pasuruan City	8	1	3	9	1			3		2		1					2		30	
Probolinggo City	6	4	5	7	3			3									2		30	
Surabaya	5	8	11	5	2			5				3		3	5		3		50	
Total seats	337	218	307	215	134	0	5	103	0	27	0	74	11	144	11	7	101	1	1695	

=== Bali ===
Regency/City	PKB	Gerindra	PDIP	Golkar	Nasdem	Buruh	Gelora	PKS	PKN	Hanura	Garuda	PAN	PBB	Demokrat	PSI	Perindo	PPP	Ummat	Total	Src.
Badung		4	27	11										3					45	
Bangli		1	20	5	2									2					30	
Buleleng	1	4	18	11	6					2				3					45	
Gianyar		4	31	5	1									3		1			45	
Jembrana	2	4	15	6										6			2		35	
Karangasem		9	15	8	5					1				6		1			45	
Klungkung		8	12	3	2					3					1	1			30	
Tabanan		4	31	4										1					40	
Denpasar		9	22	7	1		1							2	3				45	
Total seats	3	47	191	60	17	0	1	0	0	6	0	0	0	26	4	3	2	0	360	

=== West Nusa Tenggara ===
Regency/City	PKB	Gerindra	PDIP	Golkar	Nasdem	Buruh	Gelora	PKS	PKN	Hanura	Garuda	PAN	PBB	Demokrat	PSI	Perindo	PPP	Ummat	Total	Src.
Bima	2	4	4	9	4		1	4		1		5	1	4			6		45	
Dompu	3	5		2	7			2		2		2	2	3			2		30	
West Lombok	5	4		6	5		1	5		1		4		4		4	5	1	45	
Central Lombok	6	7	1	7	6		1	6		1		2	1	4		2	6		50	
East Lombok	4	6	3	4	5		2	5		1		6	1	5		4	4		50	
North Lombok	6	5	3	3	1			2				1	3	3		1	2		30	
Sumbawa	4	5	5	6	5		4	5		1		4		3			3		45	
West Sumbawa	2	3	5	3	3			3				3	1				2		25	
Bima City		2	1	5	3			3		1		5	1	4					25	
Mataram	1	5	5	7	4			6		1		2		4			5		40	
Total seats	33	46	27	52	43	0	9	41	0	9	0	34	10	34	0	11	35	1	385	

=== East Nusa Tenggara ===
Regency/City	PKB	Gerindra	PDIP	Golkar	Nasdem	Buruh	Gelora	PKS	PKN	Hanura	Garuda	PAN	PBB	Demokrat	PSI	Perindo	PPP	Ummat	Total	Src.
Alor	4	4	2	3	3			4				2		3	1	2	2		30	
Belu	2	4	4	3	3			2		2		2		4	3	1			30	
Ende	3	2	5	4	4			1		3		1		3	4				30	
East Flores	4	3	5	3	7		1					5		1		1			30	
Kupang	3	4	3	5	4		1			3		3	2	2	3	2			35	
Lembata	3	2	3	4	3		1	1	1			2		4		1			25	
Malaka	3	3	3	4	3							2		3	3	1			25	
Manggarai	4	4	5	4	4					3		3		5		3			35	
West Manggarai	3	3	2	2	7			2		2		2	1	4		2			30	
East Manggarai	3	2	5	2	3					4		4		5		2			30	
Nagekeo	5	3	3	1	3			1		2		2		2		3			25	
Ngada	3	5	3	5	3							2		1		3			25	
Rote Ndao	3	3	3	2	4		1			3		1			2	2	1		25	
Sabu Raijua	3	2	3	4	3					1		1		2		1			20	
Sikka	4	3	4	4	4			1		2	2			4	2	4	1		35	
West Sumba	2	3	2	3	2					5				2	3	3			25	
Southwest Sumba	3	4	5	5	5			1		3		4				5			35	
Central Sumba	3	2	2	2	3					2				1	3	2			20	
East Sumba	4	3	5	5	4					2		5		2					30	
South Central Timor	5	5	6	5	5			1		4		1		4		4			40	
North Central Timor	4	4	4	5	5					1		2		2	1	2			30	
Kupang City	5	5	5	5	5					3		4		4	3	1			40	
Total seats	76	73	82	80	87	0	4	14	1	45	2	48	3	58	28	45	4	0	650	

=== West Kalimantan ===
Regency/City	PKB	Gerindra	PDIP	Golkar	Nasdem	Buruh	Gelora	PKS	PKN	Hanura	Garuda	PAN	PBB	Demokrat	PSI	Perindo	PPP	Ummat	Total	Src.
Bengkayang	2	6	5	5	4					2				4		2			30	
Kapuas Hulu		4	5	3	4					2		4		4		1	3		30	
North Kayong	3			4	3		2	1		4		4		1		1	2		25	
Ketapang	2	8	8	9	5			2		3		2		5			1		45	
Kubu Raya	6	5	7	5	9			5		2		1		4			1		45	
Landak	1	5	13	3	6					4		1		4	3				40	
Melawi	1	2	5	4	3			2				11					2		30	
Mempawah	4	4	3	6	5			1		2		5		4			1		35	
Sambas	5	8	5	6	7			4		1		5		3			1		45	
Sanggau	3	5	9	7	4			1		1		3		5		1	1		40	
Sekadau		6	7	3	4					1		2		4		2	1		30	
Sintang	3	5	6	4	6			2		4		3		5		1	1		40	
Pontianak	4	7	7	6	5			5		2		2		5			2		45	
Singkawang	5	2	5	3	3			4		1		4		3					30	
Total seats	39	67	85	68	68	0	2	27	0	29	0	47	0	51	3	8	16	0	510	

=== Central Kalimantan ===
Regency/City	PKB	Gerindra	PDIP	Golkar	Nasdem	Buruh	Gelora	PKS	PKN	Hanura	Garuda	PAN	PBB	Demokrat	PSI	Perindo	PPP	Ummat	Total	Src.
South Barito	2	2	8	2	3							3		2		2	1		25	
East Barito	3	4	4	4						2				2	1	4	1		25	
North Barito	5	1	4	2	1			1		1		2		6			2		25	
Gunung Mas		2	6	6	3							1		3		4			25	
Kapuas	4	6	7	7	6			1		1		4	1	2			1		40	
Katingan	4	3	7	4	3					1				1		1	1		25	
West Kotawaringin	2	6	7	6	3			1				2		3					30	
East Kotawaringin	5	6	10	5	2			3				5		3		1			40	
Lamandau		5	3	10	4									1			2		25	
Murung Raya	3	1	6	1	3			3				3		2			3		25	
Pulang Pisau	3	2	6	6	2							1		2			3		25	
Seruyan	2	3	7	5	2			1		1		2		1			1		25	
Sukamara	1	4	2	2	1					3		1		2		2	2		20	
Palangkaraya	3	3	3	6	3					1		3		4	2	2			30	
Total seats	37	48	80	66	36	0	0	10	0	10	0	27	1	34	3	16	17	0	385	

=== South Kalimantan ===
Regency/City	PKB	Gerindra	PDIP	Golkar	Nasdem	Buruh	Gelora	PKS	PKN	Hanura	Garuda	PAN	PBB	Demokrat	PSI	Perindo	PPP	Ummat	Total	Src.
Balangan	1	1	2	2	5			2				3		3			6		25	
Banjar	5	8	1	8	7		1	3				4	1	2			5		45	
Barito Kuala	1	3	3	12	4			3				3					6		35	
South Hulu Sungai	3	3	4	4	4		1	6				2		1			2		30	
Central Hulu Sungai		5	2	5	4			4				4		4			2		30	
North Hulu Sungai	6	3	1	10	2			3				1		1			3		30	
Kotabaru	3	4	6	4	2			2		2		6	2	2			2		35	
Tabalong	5	5	1	4	6			4				3		2					30	
Tanah Bumbu	7	6	9	3	3			2				5							35	
Tanah Laut	3	7	6	5	4			2				4		3			1		35	
Tapin	2	3	3	10	2			1				1		2			1		25	
Banjarbaru	3	4	3	6	3			2				3		3			3		30	
Banjarmasin	5	6	5	7	2			7				7		5			1		45	
Total seats	44	58	46	80	48	0	2	41	0	2	0	46	3	28	0	0	32	0	430	

=== East Kalimantan ===
Regency/City	PKB	Gerindra	PDIP	Golkar	Nasdem	Buruh	Gelora	PKS	PKN	Hanura	Garuda	PAN	PBB	Demokrat	PSI	Perindo	PPP	Ummat	Total	Src.
Berau	1	4	2	4	5			4		3				2		1	4		30	
West Kutai	1	3	6	5	2			1		2		2		2		1			25	
Kutai Kartanegara	4	6	16	9	4			2				4							45	
East Kutai		3	3	7	6		1	7				2		6		1	4		40	
Mahakam Ulu	2	8	2	3								3		2					20	
Paser	12	1	2	7	3									5					30	
Penajam North Paser	2	4	3	3	2		1	3		1		1	1	4					25	
Balikpapan	4	6	4	16	7			3		2				1			2		45	
Bontang	4	3	3	7	2		1	2				2		1					25	
Samarinda	2	9	6	8	5		1	5				4		4			1		45	
Total seats	32	47	47	69	36	0	4	27	0	8	0	18	1	27	0	3	11	0	330	

=== North Kalimantan ===
Regency/City	PKB	Gerindra	PDIP	Golkar	Nasdem	Buruh	Gelora	PKS	PKN	Hanura	Garuda	PAN	PBB	Demokrat	PSI	Perindo	PPP	Ummat	Total	Src.
Bulungan	2	3	3	5	2			2		3		2		1			2		25	
Malinau	1	1	2	1	2			1		1				9		1	1		20	
Nunukan	1	3	3	2	4			5		6		1	1	4					30	
Tana Tidung	2	2	1	2	1					2		5		1	2		2		20	
Tarakan	3	5	4	4	2			3		3		1		4			1		30	
Total seats	9	14	13	14	11	0	0	11	0	15	0	9	1	19	2	1	6	0	125	

=== South Sulawesi ===
Regency/City	PKB	Gerindra	PDIP	Golkar	Nasdem	Buruh	Gelora	PKS	PKN	Hanura	Garuda	PAN	PBB	Demokrat	PSI	Perindo	PPP	Ummat	Total	Src.
Bantaeng	3	1		4	5			5				4		3			5		30	
Barru	2	4	4	5	5			2						1			2		25	
Bone	7	8	2	6	4			4		1		3		4		1	5		45	
Bulukumba	6	5	1	5	4			7		3		3		3			3		40	
Enrekang	3			4	9			3		1		5	1	2			2		30	
Gowa	1	8	1	4	6			2				6		4		1	12	-	45	
Jeneponto	6	4		6	7			2		3		4		1		1	5	1	40	
Selayar Islands	1	1	2	9	3			4				4		1					25	
Luwu	4	5	5	5	6			1						3		1	5		35	
East Luwu	1	2	10	4	7		1	2		1		5		1			1		35	
North Luwu	3	3	1	11	5					2		6		3			1		35	
Maros	3	3		6	4			3		1		12	1	2					35	
Pangkajene and Islands	2	5	2	5	12					1		2		3			3		35	
Pinrang	5	6	2	6	11		2			1		1		3			3		40	
Sidenreng Rappang		4		4	12			5				1		3		2	4		35	
Sinjai	4	4		4	5			3				3	1	3			3		30	
Soppeng		3	6	11	4			1						4			1		30	
Takalar	5	4	4	3	4		3	3		1		1		3			4		35	
Tana Toraja		6	4	7	6		1			1				4		1			30	
North Toraja		6	5	7	2							1		5	2	2			30	
Wajo	6	8		5	4		1	2				6		5			3		40	
Makassar	5	6	5	6	8			6		2		3		3		1	5		50	
Palopo		3	3	6	6			1		1		2		3					25	
Parepare	2	3	1	5	3		2	2		1		2		2			2		25	
Total seats	69	102	58	138	142	0	10	58	0	20	0	74	3	69	2	10	69	1	825	

=== West Sulawesi ===
Regency/City	PKB	Gerindra	PDIP	Golkar	Nasdem	Buruh	Gelora	PKS	PKN	Hanura	Garuda	PAN	PBB	Demokrat	PSI	Perindo	PPP	Ummat	Total	Src.
Majene	2	4	1	2	2		1	1				3		6			3		25	
Mamasa	1	2	3	2	3			2	1	3		3		2	1		2		25	
Mamuju	1	2	4	2	4			2		3		2	1	9					30	
Central Mamuju	3		2	7	3			1				2		5		1	1		25	
Pasangkayu	2	4	5	7	4			1				1		1					25	
Polewali Mandar	5	4	4	7	7		1	1		1		4		1		2	3		40	
Total seats	14	16	19	27	23	0	2	8	1	7	0	15	1	24	1	3	9	0	170	

=== Southeast Sulawesi ===
Regency/City	PKB	Gerindra	PDIP	Golkar	Nasdem	Buruh	Gelora	PKS	PKN	Hanura	Garuda	PAN	PBB	Demokrat	PSI	Perindo	PPP	Ummat	Total	Src.
Bombana	4	4	4	2	4			2				3	2						25	
Buton	2	2	2	4	2			3	1			3		3		1	2		25	
South Buton	4	2	7	4	2			1	1	2				2					25	
Central Buton	3	3	5	1	5			2	1	1		2	1	1					25	
North Buton	3	3	3	4				1				5		1					20	
Kolaka	1	4	5	1	4			4		1		2		5		2	1		30	
East Kolaka	1	4	3	3	7			3				2		1			1		25	
North Kolaka	5	3	4	1	6								1	3			2		25	
Konawe	2	4	6	4	4			1				6	3						30	
Konawe Islands	1	3	2	2	1			1		3		1		5	1				20	
South Konawe	1	3	3	9	7			4		1		1	3	2			1		35	
North Konawe	1	1	3	2	2					1		2	7	1					20	
Muna	3	4	5	4	3			3		2		1	1	4					30	
West Muna	3	1	5	3	3								1	3			1		20	
Wakatobi	1	2	9	5	2			1		2		2		1					25	
Baubau	1	3	3	3	2			1	2	3		2	1	1			3		25	
Kendari		2	5	6	5			6				4		4		2	1		35	
Total seats	36	48	74	58	59	0	0	33	5	16	0	36	20	37	1	5	12	0	440	

=== Central Sulawesi ===
Regency/City	PKB	Gerindra	PDIP	Golkar	Nasdem	Buruh	Gelora	PKS	PKN	Hanura	Garuda	PAN	PBB	Demokrat	PSI	Perindo	PPP	Ummat	Total	Src.
Banggai	3	7	6	11	4			1		1		2							35	
Banggai Islands	4	3	3	3	4			1		1			1	3	1	1			25	
Banggai Laut	1	1	4	2	4			2		2				4					20	
Buol	3	3	2	2	4							3		4		2	2		25	
Donggala	4	4	3	4	6			4				3		3		4			35	
Morowali	2	4	1	3	5			1		1			2	3		3			25	
North Morowali	2	2	2	7	3			1		5				3					25	
Parigi Moutong	4	5	7	5	5			3		2		2		2		4	1		40	
Poso	1	3	4	4	5			3				2		7		1			30	
Sigi	1	5	4	5	4			1				1	2	5		2			30	
Tojo Una-Una	3	2	2	5	3			1				1	1	2		1	4		25	
Tolitoli	2	4	1	4	4			3		1		3	6	1			1		30	
Palu	3	5	3	4	4			4		4		2		3	1	2			35	
Total seats	33	48	42	59	55	0	0	25	0	17	0	19	12	40	2	20	8	0	380	

=== Gorontalo ===
Regency/City	PKB	Gerindra	PDIP	Golkar	Nasdem	Buruh	Gelora	PKS	PKN	Hanura	Garuda	PAN	PBB	Demokrat	PSI	Perindo	PPP	Ummat	Total	Src.
Boalemo	1	4	5	4	4							1		3		1	2		25	
Bone Bolango		3		4	6		2	2		1		2		1			4		25	
Gorontalo Regency	2	4	4	9	6			4				2		3			6		40	
North Gorontalo		1	6	4	7			2		5									25	
Pohuwato	3	6	1	7	3			1				1		1			2		25	
Gorontalo City		4	4	6	4							4		3			5		30	
Total seats	6	22	20	34	30	0	2	9	0	6	0	10	0	11	0	1	19	0	170	

=== North Sulawesi ===
Regency/City	PKB	Gerindra	PDIP	Golkar	Nasdem	Buruh	Gelora	PKS	PKN	Hanura	Garuda	PAN	PBB	Demokrat	PSI	Perindo	PPP	Ummat	Total	Src.
Bolaang Mongondow	4	1	9	6	6			3									1		30	
South Bolaang Mongondow	2	1	11	2	2			1				1							20	
East Bolaang Mongondow		1	4		8							1		5		1			20	
North Bolaang Mongondow	2		5	3								1		2		2	5		20	
Sangihe Islands	2	2	6	4	5					1				2		3			25	
Siau Tagulandang Biaro Islands		1	10	4	2											3			20	
Talaud Islands		2	5	3	4					1				6	1	3			25	
Minahasa		7	19	4	1									3		1			35	
South Minahasa		2	13	7	4									3		1			30	
Southeast Minahasa		1	10	6	3									4			1		25	
North Minahasa	2	4	10	5	1								1	4	1	2			30	
Bitung		7	11	3	4							1		3		1			30	
Kotamobagu	5		9	2	4					3				1			1		25	
Manado		6	16	5	2			2				1		5	1	2			40	
Tomohon		3	15	7															25	
Total seats	17	38	153	61	46	0	0	6	0	5	0	5	1	38	3	19	8	0	400	

=== Maluku ===
Regency/City	PKB	Gerindra	PDIP	Golkar	Nasdem	Buruh	Gelora	PKS	PKN	Hanura	Garuda	PAN	PBB	Demokrat	PSI	Perindo	PPP	Ummat	Total	Src.
Buru	3	1	2	3	4			3				1		2		1	5		25	
South Buru	2		3	2	2			2				3		2		2	2		20	
Aru Islands	4	2	4	1	4			1	2	2		1		1		2	1		25	
Tanimbar Islands	2	3	3	3	3			3		2		1		1	3	1			25	
Southwest Maluku	2	2	4	3	2					3		1		2		1			20	
Central Maluku	4	6	5	4	3		1	5		1		3		4	1	2	1		40	
Southeast Maluku	2	3	3	2	3			2	1	1		3			2	3			25	
West Seram	3	3	5	2	5			3		1		3		3		1	1		30	
East Seram	3	2	3	3	3			2	1	2		2		2			2		25	
Ambon	4	3	4	3	4	1		2		2		2		3	1	4	2		35	
Tual	2	1	2	1	2			2		2			2	2	1	1	2		20	
Total seats	31	26	38	27	35	1	1	25	4	16	0	20	2	22	8	18	16	0	290	

=== North Maluku ===
Regency/City	PKB	Gerindra	PDIP	Golkar	Nasdem	Buruh	Gelora	PKS	PKN	Hanura	Garuda	PAN	PBB	Demokrat	PSI	Perindo	PPP	Ummat	Total	Src.
West Halmahera	3	2	3	3	3					1		1		6	1	2			25	
South Halmahera	5	3	2	3	3			5		1	1	2		2	1	2			30	
East Halmahera		2	2	2	2		2	1		2	2	2	1	1		1			20	
North Halmahera	1	3	4	4	4		2	1		1		3		4	1	2			30	
Central Halmahera	4	3	3	3	3					2		1				1			20	
Sula Islands	2	2	4	5	1			1		2		1	2	4			1		25	
Morotai Island	2	3	3	2				3		1		1		2	3				20	
Taliabu Island	2	2	1	7	2			1	1	1		1		1			1		20	
Ternate	4	4	3	4	4					1		1	2	3		2	2		30	
Tidore	3	1	12	1	2			2				2		2					25	
Total seats	26	25	37	34	24	0	4	14	1	12	3	15	5	25	6	10	4	0	245	

=== Papua ===
Regency/City	PKB	Gerindra	PDIP	Golkar	Nasdem	Buruh	Gelora	PKS	PKN	Hanura	Garuda	PAN	PBB	Demokrat	PSI	Perindo	PPP	Ummat	Total	Src.
Biak Numfor	2	3	5	3	3			1			1	3			3		1		25	
Jayapura	3	2	2	3	4		1	1	2	1				3	1	3	2	2	30	
Keerom		1	1	6	2			3					1	2	1	2	1		20	
Yapen Islands	4		2	3	4		1	1	2	1				2		3	1	1	25	
Mamberamo Raya		1	2	3	1	1				2		3	1	1	1	3	1		20	
Sarmi	3	2	2	2	3			1				1	3	2			1		20	
Supiori	2	3	3	4	2		1			3		1					1		20	
Waropen	1		4	3	1		1			2		3	1	2		1	1		20	
Jayapura City	2	3	3	6	4		2	4	1	2		1		2	2	1	2		35	
Total seats	17	15	24	33	24	1	6	11	5	11	1	12	6	14	8	13	11	3	215	

=== West Papua ===
Regency/City	PKB	Gerindra	PDIP	Golkar	Nasdem	Buruh	Gelora	PKS	PKN	Hanura	Garuda	PAN	PBB	Demokrat	PSI	Perindo	PPP	Ummat	Total	Src.
Fakfak	2	3	1	3	2			2		1		1	2	1		2			20	
Kaimana	1	5	5	3	2					1		2			1				20	
Manokwari	3	4	5	4	3	1		2				2		1	1	2	2		30	
Pegunungan Arfak			1	1	1			3		2	2	3		2	2	3			20	
Manokwari Selatan	2	3	5		4			1				1	1			2	1		20	
Teluk Bintuni		1	2	4	4			1				1				3	4		20	
Teluk Wondama	1	4	2	3	1					1		2		1	1	1	2	1	20	
Total seats	9	20	21	18	17	1	0	9	0	5	2	12	3	5	5	13	9	1	150	

=== Southwest Papua ===
Regency/City	PKB	Gerindra	PDIP	Golkar	Nasdem	Buruh	Gelora	PKS	PKN	Hanura	Garuda	PAN	PBB	Demokrat	PSI	Perindo	PPP	Ummat	Total	Src.
Maybrat	2	3	3	3	4			3						2					20	
Raja Ampat		3		2	2			2		3	2	1		5					20	
Sorong	3	1	4	6	2		1	2		1		1		3		1			25	
South Sorong	2		4	3	4			3		1		1		2					20	
Tambrauw	3	3	2	3	3			1		1	1		1	1			1		20	
Sorong City	1	1	3	6	3	1		4		2		3		3	1	2			30	
Total seats	11	11	16	23	18	1	1	15	0	8	3	6	1	16	1	3	1	0	135	

=== Central Papua ===
Regency/City	PKB	Gerindra	PDIP	Golkar	Nasdem	Buruh	Gelora	PKS	PKN	Hanura	Garuda	PAN	PBB	Demokrat	PSI	Perindo	PPP	Ummat	Total	Src.
Deiyai	2	1	2	4	1				1	2			1			1	3	2	20	
Dogiyai			1		1		2	2	3	2	3	1	2	2	4	2			25	
Intan Jaya		2	3	1	3			1	2	3	1	4		2	1	1	1		25	
Mimika	5	4	5	7	3					1		1	2	4		3			35	
Nabire		3	5	3	1			2		1	1	2	1	1	2	1	2		25	
Paniai	3		6		1	1			1	1	1	1	4		1	2	3		25	
Puncak		4	1	2	2		1	2	1	2	1	1		2	1	2	1	2	25	
Puncak Jaya	2	5	4	3	4			2	1	2		2	1			4			30	
Total seats	12	19	27	20	16	1	3	9	9	14	7	12	11	11	9	16	10	4	210	

=== Highlands Papua ===
Regency/City	PKB	Gerindra	PDIP	Golkar	Nasdem	Buruh	Gelora	PKS	PKN	Hanura	Garuda	PAN	PBB	Demokrat	PSI	Perindo	PPP	Ummat	Total	Src.
Jayawijaya	2	3	6		2				2	1	2	1		4	1	6			30	
Lanny Jaya		2	1		3	1	1	5	4		4	3	1	2	2	1			30	
Central Mamberamo	1	2	3	3	4				1	1			1	2	1		1		20	
Nduga	1	1	2	2	4		2	4	1		1			4	1	2			25	
Pegunungan Bintang		2	6	3	2			2	1	1			1	5		2			25	
Tolikara	6	1	6	2		1		8			1	1	1	2		1			30	
Yahukimo	1	2	2	2	12				3	1	1	1	2	2		3	1	2	35	
Yalimo	2	3	2	1	2	1		2	1	2	3	2	3		1				25	
Total seats	13	16	28	13	29	3	3	21	1	3	6	12	8	9	21	6	15	2	2220	

=== South Papua ===
Regency/City	PKB	Gerindra	PDIP	Golkar	Nasdem	Buruh	Gelora	PKS	PKN	Hanura	Garuda	PAN	PBB	Demokrat	PSI	Perindo	PPP	Ummat	Total	Src.
Asmat	1	3	8	4	2		1	2				3			1				25	
Boven Digoel		2	4	3	3			1				1		3		2	1		20	
Mappi	4	2	3	2	4			2		1	1	1	2	2			1		25	
Merauke	5	4	5	3	5			3						1	1		3		30	
Total seats	10	11	20	12	14	0	1	8	0	1	1	5	2	6	2	2	5	0	100	
