= I Gede Pasek Suardika =

Indonesian politician

- ᬇᬕᭂᬤᬾᬧᬲᭂᬓ᭄ᬲᬸᬯᬃᬤᬶᬓ
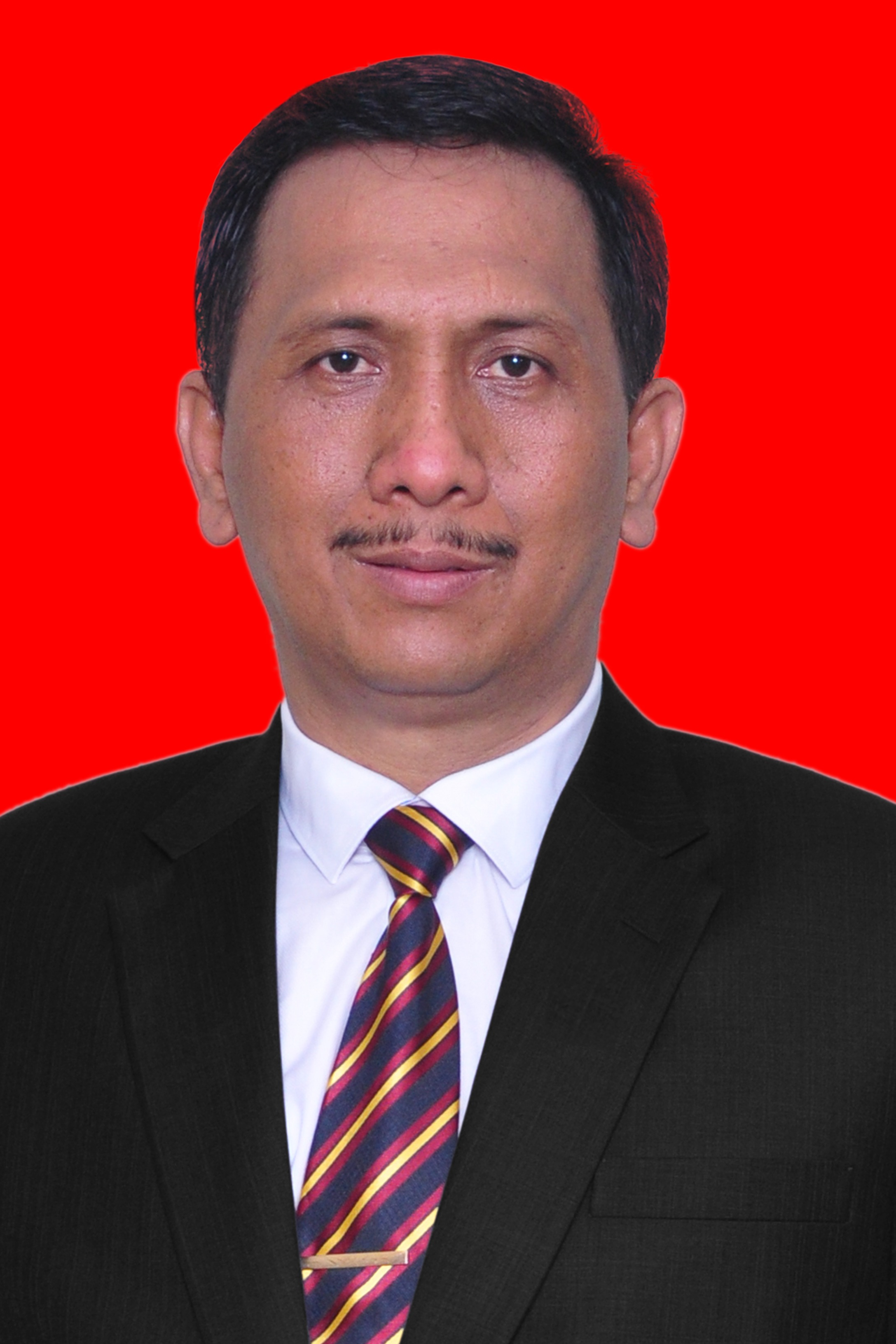
- Electoral portrait, 2023

1st General Chairman of Nusantara Awakening Party
- In office 28 October 2021 – 14 July 2023
- Preceded by: Position created
- Succeeded by: Anas Urbaningrum

Member of the House of Representatives
- In office 2009 – 1 October 2014
- Preceded by: Jero Wacik

Indonesia Senator from Bali
- In office 1 October 2014 – 1 October 2019

Personal details
- Born: 21 July 1969 (age 57) Singaraja, Bali, Indonesia
- Party: PKN (since 2021)
- Other political affiliations: Democratic (2008–2014); Hanura (2016–2021)
- Education: Bachelor of Laws (Brawijaya University); Master of Laws (Udayana University); Doctor of Laws (Padjadjaran University)
- Occupation: Advocate (Lawyer), politician

I Gede Pasek Suardika (Balinese: ᬇᬕᭂᬤᬾᬧᬲᭂᬓ᭄ᬲᬸᬯᬃᬤᬶᬓ; born 21 July 1969) is an Indonesian lawyer and politician of the Nusantara Awakening Party (PKN) and its chairman from 2021 to 2023. He was a member of the House of Representatives (DPR) from 2009 to 2014 and the Regional Representative Council (DPD) as a senator for Bali from 2014 to 2019.

Before becoming PKN's chairman, Suardika was a member of the Democratic Party (Demokrat) from 2008 to 2014 and was a member of the People's Conscience Party (Hanura) from 2016 to 2021.

== Early life ==
I Gede Pasek Suardika was born on 21 July 1969 in Singaraja, Bali. His father, I Komang Alit, served as a police captain. He studied at elementary, middle and high schools in Singaraja. He then studied law, obtaining a bachelor's degree at Brawijaya University and a master's degree at Udayana University.

== Career ==
Before entering politics, Pasek worked as a journalist in Bali and in East Java. He was also a lawyer and political consultant, advising regional leader candidates in Balinese local elections. He campaigned for Susilo Bambang Yudhoyono in the 2004 Indonesian presidential election. He was appointed to replace Jero Wacik as a Demokrat legislator in 2009, as Wacik was appointed a government minister. He chaired the council's Third Commission until 2013, when he was removed after attending the declaration of an organization founded by former Demokrat chairman Anas Urbaningrum. In January 2014, Demokrat fired him from the party due to "ethics violations", and attempted to replace him in the council. However, the body rejected Pasek's removal as it considered the removal illegal. Pasek continued to attend legislature meetings after the firing.

For the 2014 legislative election, Pasek ran as a member of the Regional Representative Council, and was elected as a senator to represent Bali. He joined the People's Conscience Party in December 2016. He was part of Joko Widodo's campaign team for the 2019 presidential election. In January 2020, he was appointed the party's secretary-general by chairman Oesman Sapta Odang. Pasek left the party in October 2021 to become chairman of the newly founded Nusantara Awakening Party (PKN). PKN's founders were largely former Demokrat politicians affiliated with Anas Urbaningrum, along with some Hanura members.

By May 2023, Pasek stated that he intended to hand over the party's chairmanship to Anas upon Anas' completion of parole (Anas had been imprisoned for corruption charges in 2013 and was released on parole in April 2023) in July 2023. During a special party conference on 14 July 2023, Anas was appointed as the new chairman, while Pasek became chairman of the party's executive committee. In opening the conference, Pasek stated that he was "returning" Anas to becoming a chairman, referring to Anas' old position in Demokrat. In the 2024 Indonesian legislative election, Pasek ran as a candidate for the House of Representatives from the Bali electoral district.

During the 2024 Indonesian local elections, Pasek joined the campaign team of Made Muliawan Arya in the 2024 Bali gubernatorial election.
