= Subur Budhisantoso =

Indonesian politician and professor

Subur Budhisantoso (born August 27, 1937 Garut, Indonesia) is an Indonesian politician and professor. He was one of the first leaders of the Democratic Party of Indonesia from 2001 to 2005.

== Scientific work ==
Several scientific papers he has published include:

- "Environmental Limitations and Social Craze" Journal of Scientific Anthropology of Indonesia, Th. XXIII, No. 9, May – August.
- "The Revival of Ethnicity in Indonesian Society" National Resilience Journal.
- "Tourism and Community Empowerment in Tourism Destinations" Pranata Media.
- "Art and Culture of Indonesia" Taman Mini Indonesia Indah's twenty-first year book, Taman Mini Indonesia Indah, Jakarta.
- "Identification of Problems in Change and Coping Strategies" Department of Defense.
