= General Election Supervisory Agency =

Indonesian election supervisory agency

- Badan Pengawas Pemilihan Umum
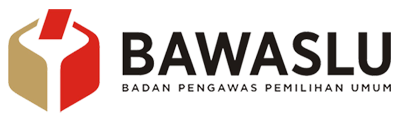

- Bawaslu building in Jakarta, 2024

Agency overview
- Formed: 8 April 2008; 17 years ago
- Jurisdiction: Government of Indonesia
- Status: Regulatory agency
- Headquarters: Jakarta, Indonesia
- Annual budget: $558,348,000 USD (FY 2019).
- Agency executives: Rahmat Bagja, Chairman; Gunawan Suswantoro, Secretary-general
- Key document: Law No. 22/2017
- Website: bawaslu.go.id

The General Election Supervisory Agency (Indonesian: Badan Pengawas Pemilihan Umum, Bawaslu) is an independent supervisory agency tasked with oversight the administration of general elections throughout Indonesia. Originally established by the General Election Administration Act 2007 c. 22 and later replaced by the General Election Administration Act 2011 c. 15, the statute describes its duties as "to supervise the administration of general elections".

== Membership ==
The Agency have five members, including a chairperson elected by its members. By law, at least 30% of the members must be female. The President appoints 10 candidates (twice of the statutory requirement) with approval from the People's Consultative Assembly (DPR), which will serve a five-year term, and the chairperson is elected by and amongst its members.

A member of BAWASLU can only be terminated by the President under grounds as specified by law which includes: no longer meeting the membership requirements, violating the oath of office and code of ethics, incapability to performing their duties for three consecutive months without valid reason, convicted of a felony and sentenced with imprisonment for five years or longer, or not attending a plenary session for three times consecutively without valid reasoning as deemed appropriate.

== Official duties ==
The Agency's role is restricted to supervising election administration. It is responsible for organising standards of election administration supervisory work procedure to serve as a guideline for election supervisors in every level (national, provincial, municipal, etc).

In order to supervise and ensure the administration of a fair election, both by preventive and responsive measures, the agency is tasked with supervising preparations before an election; the administration of an election as it is ongoing; manage and store documents and archives, monitoring the enforcement of election offences by the competent authorities; supervising the enforcement of election offence convictions; evaluating supervision of election; publishing an election supervisory report; and other duties as prescribed by applicable laws and provision.

== Members ==
=== Current ===
- Rahmat Bagja (Chairman)
- Puadi
- Totok Haryono
- Herwyn Jefler H. Malonda
- Lolly Suhenty

== See also ==
- General Elections Commission
- Elections in Indonesia
