= Anas Urbaningrum =

Indonesian politician

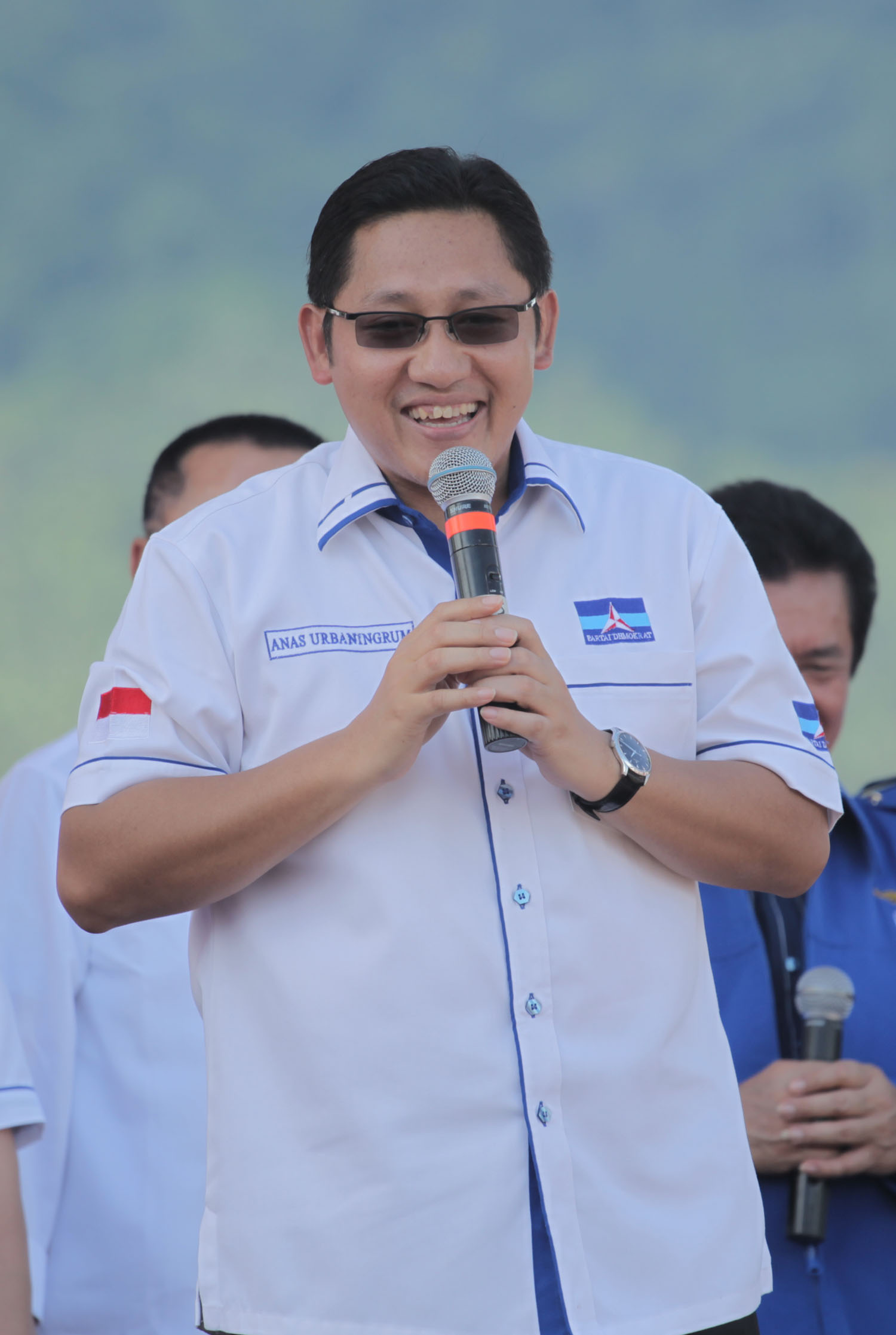
- Urbaningrum in 2011

2nd General Chairman of Nusantara Awakening Party
- In office 14 July 2023 – 2 March 2026
- Secretary-General: Sri Mulyono
- Preceded by: I Gede Pasek Suardika
- Succeeded by: I Gede Pasek Suardika

3rd General Chairman of Democratic Party
- In office 23 May 2010 – 23 February 2013
- Secretary-General: Edhie Yudhoyono
- Preceded by: Hadi Utomo
- Succeeded by: Susilo Bambang Yudhoyono

Member of the House of Representatives
- In office 1 October 2009 – 23 July 2010
- Preceded by: Nurhayati Ali Assegaf
- Succeeded by: Maimara Tando
- Constituency: East Java VI

Member of the General Elections Commission
- In office 2001–2005

Personal details
- Born: 15 July 1969 (age 57) Blitar, Indonesia
- Party: Independent (since 2026)
- Other political affiliations: Democratic (2005–2013); PKN (2023–2026)
- Spouse: Athiyyah Laila
- Children: Akmal Naseery; Aqeela Nawal Fathina; Aqeel Najih Enayat; Aisara Najma Waleefa
- Website: www.suratdarianas.com

Anas Urbaningrum (born 15 July 1969) is an Indonesian politician who is the chairman of the Nusantara Awakening Party (PKN). He was the chairman of the Democratic Party (Demokrat), the party who won Indonesia's general election in 2009, between 2010 and 2013. Elected at the age of 40, he was one of the youngest party leaders in Indonesia. Before this, he was the head of the Democratic Party's national division on Political and Regional Autonomy, and also the head of the Democratic fraction in House of Representatives (DPR) of the Republic of Indonesia.

Anas was elected to become a member of Indonesia's Parliament during the election of 2009 from the election region of East Java VII, which includes the Blitar City, Blitar Regency, Kediri City, Kediri Regency, and Tulungagung Regency obtaining the highest votes. He has since resigned from this position in the Parliament following his election as party chairman. After being named a graft suspect by Corruption Eradication Commission (KPK) for allegedly taking a bribe in relation with the construction of the Hambalang sports complex, he resigned from the post of the Democratic Party chairman on 23 February 2013.

In September 2014 he was sentenced to 8 years in prison for corruption. He was released on 10 July 2023.

== Early life ==
Anas was born in the village of Ngaglik, Srengat, Blitar, East Java and spent his primary, middle and high school years there. His family had links with the Nahdlatul Ulama movement, his father being a schoolteacher and an Islamic cleric. After graduating from high school, he studied at Arilangga University in Surabaya through the national program for gifted students (Penelusuran Minat dan Kemampuan or PMDK) in 1987. He majored in political science in the Faculty of Social and Political Sciences, graduating in 1992.

Anas continued his education in the Graduate School at the University of Indonesia in Jakarta and obtained his master's degree in political science in 2000. His thesis has been published as Democratic-Islam: The Thoughts of Nurcholish Madji (Republika, 2000). He is currently finishing his doctoral program in political science in the Graduate School of Gadjah Mada University, Yogyakarta.

== Political career ==
Anas entered the political arena through a college student organization. He joined the Islamic Students Association (HMI) and became the chairman of HMI during the congress in Yogyakarta in 1997.

As the leader of the largest student organization, Anas became involved in political reform of 1998. During this time he became a member of the Political Law Revision Team, or Team Seven, which was pursuing the demands of the Reformasi movement.

During the first democratic election in 1999 Anas became a member of the Political Parties Selection Team, or Team Eleven, and took the responsibility to verify the eligibility of political parties to participate in the national election. He then became a member of the General Elections Commission (KPU) in 2001-2005 which initiated the election of 2004.

After resigning from the KPU, Anas joined the Democratic Party and has been Head of the Political and Regional Autonomy division since 2005.

== Becoming Member of Parliament ==
Anas was appointed as member of parliament in the election of 2009 from the voting region of East Java VII which includes the cities of Blitar, Blitar District, Kediri, Kediri and Tulungagung District taking in the largest votes at 178,381 votes, surpassing the numeric voting division (BPP) which is 177,374 votes.

On 1 October 2009, Anas was appointed as the head of the Democratic Party Fraction in Parliament. His biggest task involved unifying the Democratic Party in their voice during the case of Century Bank.

Following his election as party chairman on 23 July 2010, Anas resigned from the DPR.

== Chosen as Chairman of the Democratic Party ==
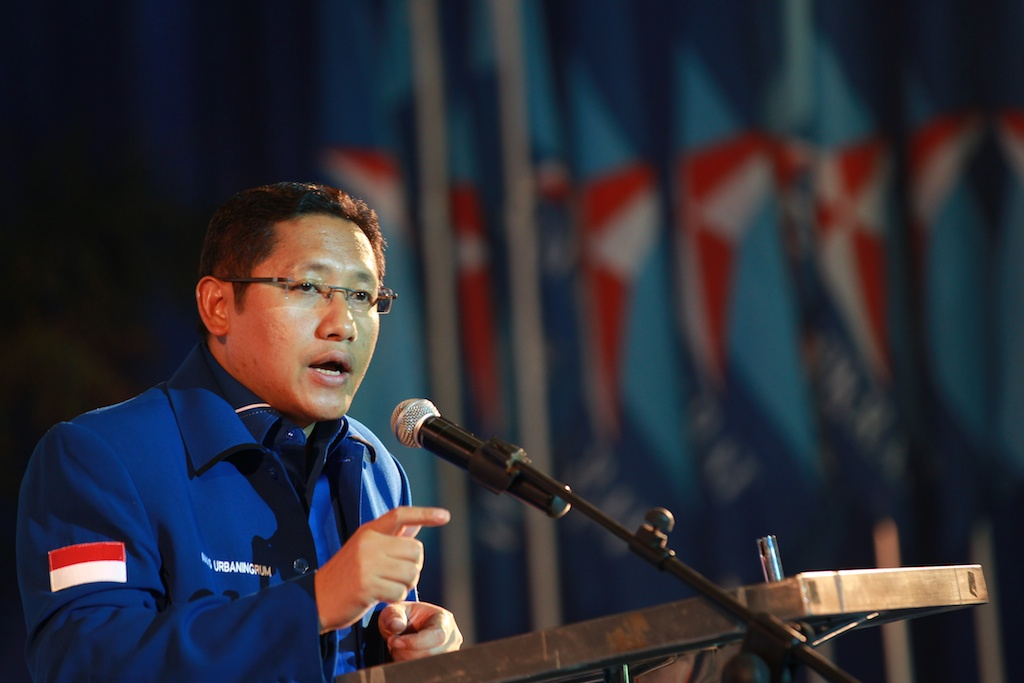
Anas Urbaningrum giving a speech as chairman

As the party who won the election of 2009, the second congress of the Democratic Party in Bandung 20–23 May 2010 becomes an important milestone in the politics of Indonesia.

Anas declared his candidacy in Jakarta on 15 April 2010. In his declaration speech, Anas emphasized that his goal was not to fight or win a race. His candidacy was not to secure a high standing official position. According to Anas, congress is arena for amicable competition amongst brothers. "All candidates are the best cadres and brothers that represent the Democratic Party."

In this declaration, Anas expressed his agenda to institutionalize the party. That is, how to transform the ideas of President Susilo Bambang Yudhoyono (SBY) as the central and most important figure of the Democratic Party into a strong party. His other agenda is internal stabilization; better, more qualified and systematic cadre recruitment; decentralizing the management of party through systematic measures; building political culture of integrity, intelligence and humility; also to manage strong and accountable logistics.

Anas's political ideas were further included in his cultural speech "Building the Culture of Democracy" that took place in Jakarta, 16 May 2010. This speech is part of a continuing culture of debate that can be traced back to Indonesia's founding fathers such as Sukarno, Hatta, Sjahrir; and other intellectuals such as Tan Malaka, Soedjatmoko, even Kartini who poured out her ideas in letters.

In this speech, Anas expressed his ideas on money politics, the patron based system, sub-nasionlalism, and the dominance of "ascribed status", weak meritocracy and "zero-sum game" as the greatest challenges in building the culture of democracy that must be protected from the pollution of money politics. Meritocracy will give rise to competent leaders, not a strongman who will bypass the system and institution such that checks and balances can progress effectively.

In the middle of his preparation for congress, Anas published his book "Silent Revolution" in the auditorium of Pikiran Rakyat, Bandung. This book describes the successful strategies of the Democratic Party and SBY in winning the election of 2009. He illustrated the diligence of the Democratic Party in surveying the market periodically and to include all elements of the party. The book also includes personal observations of how a party works hard in preparation of the election without much public fanfare.

There was tight competition in congress between three candidates: Anas, Andi Malaranggeng (who is also Minister of Youth and Sports), and Marzuki Alie (DPR RI Chairman) who only declared his candidacy one day before congress started.

In the first round of votings, Anas lead (236 votes) over Marzuki Alie (209 votes) and Andi Malarangeng (82 votes). As none of the candidates received more than 50% of the votes, there was a second round of votings. In the process of this second round, President Susilo Bambang Yudhoyono declared a statement saying that all regional and municipal representatives should vote for the general chairman of the Democratic Party by following their heart, illustrating the workings of democracy within the party.

In the second round, Anas took lead by receiving 280 votes. Marzuki Alie received 240 votes, while two votes were absentees. This election made Anas one of the youngest chairman of a political party in Indonesia. In response to the win, Anas said, "You see for yourself, I won through a democratic election. This is evidence, that in addition to being a party that prioritizes democracy, Mr. SBY is also a true democrat as he never got involved in the process of election, including supporting one of the candidates." On 17 October 2010, Anas appointed the Democratic Party's plenary board that is composed of 2,000 people, at the same time the birthday of the party was being celebrated in Jakarta.

== Corruption Case ==
The Corruption Eradication Commission (KPK) named Anas Urbaningrum a graft suspect on 22 February 2013 for allegedly taking bribes and receiving goods in relation with the construction of the Hambalang national sports complex in Bogor Regency, West Java. The KPK earlier named two other suspects in the Hambalang case – former Minister of Youth and Sports Andi Mallarangeng and Dedi Kusdinar, also of the same ministry. The following day after the KPK named him suspect, he announced his resignation from the post of the Democratic Party chief. Anas pleaded innocent in his trial but refused to reveal where his wealth was obtained. He was found guilty and given an 8 year sentence.

== Post-release ==
After an eight-year prison sentence and a three-year parole, Anas completed his sentence on 10 July 2023. On the same day, he spoke to media outlets about his intent to reenter politics. The Nusantara Awakening Party's chairman I Gede Pasek Suardika had stated in May 2023 that he intended to hand the party's chairmanship to Anas upon the latter's release from parole. On 14 July 2023, Anas was appointed as the new chairman, while Pasek became chairman of the party's executive committee.

== Experience ==
- Chairman of Democratic Party, 2010-2013
- Member of the House of Representatives and Leader of Democratic Fraction, 2009-2014 (resigned in 2010)
- Member of National Collective Leadership KAHMI, 2009–present
- Chairman of Paramadina Foundation, 2006–present
- Head of Political and Regional Autonomy division, Democratic Party, 2005-2010
- Member of General Elections Commission (KPU), 2001-2005
- Member, Political Parties Selection Team, 1999
- Member, Political Law Revision Team, 1998
- Chairman of Islamic Students Association (HMI) 1997-1999
