= Nazaruddin Sjamsuddin =

Indonesian politician

Nazaruddin Sjamsuddin (born 5 November 1944 in Bireuen, Indonesia) is a former chairman of the General Elections Commission (KPU) that oversees the operation of elections in Indonesia.

== Education and careers ==
After completing elementary, junior and senior high schools in Aceh, Nazaruddin enrolled into the Faculty of Law and Public Sciences University of Indonesia in 1963, and obtained a degree in political science in 1970. He also attended Monash University, Australia and obtained his MA and Ph.D. in political science.

As a lecturer in political science at UI he pioneered since 1968 when he was a student, and resumed after studying in Australia and continued to serve the University of Indonesia until finally given the title of Professor in political science in 1993.

== Corruption Case ==
Although the 2004 general election is considered to be successful internationally, its members, are dragged into corruption cases, one of which involved Nazaruddin Sjamsuddin. On May 20, 2005, Nazaruddin was suspected in the alleged corruption case at the KPU by the Corruption Court. He was charged and arrested, in addition to paying a fine of Rp450million, and replace state funds amounting to Rp 14.193 billion. On December 14, 2005 the Corruption Crime Court then sentenced him to seven years imprisonment on December 14, 2005. He was also required to pay a fine of Rp 300 million and pay Rp5.03 billion in liabilities jointly with Hamdani Amin, Head of KPU Finance Bureau considered to be detrimental to the state in the case of procuring personal accident insurance payable to election workers.

On February 8, 2006, Nazaruddin's lawyers reported the Panel of Judges to the Judicial Commission. The lawyers say that in deciding the case, the Panel of Judges had violated Judicial Code of Conduct. Among other things mentioned that the Panel of Judges had violated the provisions of KUHAP (Book of Criminal Procedure Law) and Law no. 31 of 1999 on Corruption Eradication juncto Law no. 20 of 2001 concerning amendment to Law no. 31 of 1999 and the Criminal Code. The report to date (2011) has never received a response from the Judicial Commission. Nazaruddin was paroled in March 2008.
