= Hadi Utomo =

Indonesian politician

Hadi Utomo (15 August 1945 in Semarang – 15 January 2017 in Jakarta) was the second chairman of the Democratic Party (Indonesia) from 2005 to 2010. He was a retired colonel. Hadi Utomo was the brother-in-law of Indonesia's 6th president Susilo Bambang Yudhoyono.

== Early life and career ==
He was born on 15 August 1945. Hadi Utomo is one of the Democratic Party (PD) cadres who previously served as deputy secretary general of the Central Executive Board (DPP) from 2001 to 2005. Through the Democratic Party, he elected as one of the members House of Representatives (DPR) of the Republic of Indonesia from 2004 to 2009. In 2005, he was elected and served as DPP chairman of the Democratic Party until 2010.

Before serving as a representative of the people in the House of Representatives, he was in the military officer. In 1970, Utomo joined the Indonesian Military Academy. The highest rank he got was as a colonel, specifically army infantry colonel (AD). He continued his military education by joining the Military Law School in 1998.

He married Mastuti Rahayu, daughter of Sarwo Edhie Wibowo.

On 15 January 2017, he died in Denpasar, from lymphoma. He was buried in the village of Klepu in Pringapus Subdistrict, Semarang Regency, Central Java.
