= Nusantara Awakening Party =

Nusantara Awakening Party Partai Kebangkitan Nusantara
- Abbreviation: PKN
- General Chairman: I Gede Pasek Suardika
- Secretary-General: Sri Mulyono
- Founded: 7 January 2022; 4 years ago
- Split from: Democratic
- Preceded by: Functional Party of Struggle
- Headquarters: Mangunsarkoro No. 16 Menteng, Jakarta
- Ideology: Pancasila; Populism; Wawasan Nusantara; Traditionalism; Indonesian nationalism Marhaenism
- Political position: Centre
- National affiliation: Advanced Indonesia Coalition Plus (since 2024)
- Ballot number: 9
- DPR seats: 0 / 580
- DPRD I seats: 4 / 2,372
- DPRD II seats: 52 / 17,510

Website
- pimnas-pkn.id

Nusantara Awakening Party (Indonesian: Partai Kebangkitan Nusantara, PKN) is a political party in Indonesia founded on January 7, 2022, and received legal recognition from the Ministry of Law and Human Rights in January 2022.

The party was founded by former Democratic Party legislator I Gede Pasek Suardika, who became the first party head, along with other expelled cadres. The party was established by taking over a minor party, the Functional Party of Struggle (Partai Karya Perjuangan), which had been inactive after failing to participate in elections.

The party qualified to participate in 2024 Indonesian general election, along with four other new parties, after fulfilling administrative criteria and actual verification by the KPU RI in December 2022. The party declared itself to be neutral in the 2024 presidential election.

== History ==
The party was established by former members of the Democratic Party who remained loyal to former chairman Anas Urbaningrum, who left the party and had since been imprisoned on corruption charges. The party was initiated by former legislator I Gede Pasek Suardika, who was joined by former Democratic Party cadre Ian Zulfikar, HMI activist Asral Hardi, journalist and photographer Bobby Triadi, and Sri Mulyono.

The party was declared on 28 October 2021—coinciding with the Youth Pledge Day—at the final Functional Party of Struggle congress, where it was transformed to Nusantara Awakening Party through changes to the party constitution. The party quickly registered the change to the Ministry of Law and Human Rights, and was recognised on 7 January 2022.

Anas himself participated in the party founding by giving advise and suggestions to its initiators, including Suardika. He later endorsed the party founding despite not giving the time of when to join the party. In February 2023, Suardika promised that Anas will be given a high-ranking position in the party after the end of his prison term expected April 2023. On 14 July 2023, Suardika handed over the chairmanship to Anas. Suardika became chairman of the party's executive committee ("Majelis Agung").

In the 2024 legislative election, the party won 326,800 votes nationwide (0.215%), the least of all 18 nationally contesting parties and failed to win a seat in the National House of Representatives. At the provincial legislature level, the party won two seats in the legislature of Highland Papua, along with a seat each in South Sumatra and Central Papua. At the regency/city level, the party had 54 elected legislators, with the party's largest contingent being in Musi Banyuasin Regency of South Sumatra with four elected legislators.

== Leadership ==
- Chairperson: I Gede Pasek Suardika
- Chairman of Executive Committee: I Gede Pasek Suardika
- Deputy Chairperson: Gerry H. Hukubun
- Treasurer: Mirwan Amir
- Secretary-General: Sri Mulyono
- Head of Organisational Department: Pranyoto Ateng
- Head of Membership Department: Yuyun. K. Soemopawiro
- Chief of Election Campaign Bureau: Bona Simanjuntak
- Executive Director: I Made Sudanayasa

== Leaders ==
No.	Name	Image	Constituency / title	Term of office		Election results
No.	Name	Image	Constituency / title	Took office	Left office	Election results
Split from: Democratic Party
1	I Gede Pasek Suardika (born 1969)		—	28 October 2021	14 July 2023	2021 Unopposed
2	Anas Urbaningrum (born 1969)		—	14 July 2023	2 March 2026	2023 Unopposed
(1)	I Gede Pasek Suardika (born 1969)		—	2 March 2026	Incumbent	2026 Unopposed

== Election results ==
=== Legislative election results ===
Election	Ballot number	Leader	Seats		Total votes	Share of votes	Outcome of election
Election	Ballot number	Leader	No.	±	Total votes	Share of votes	Outcome of election
2024	9	Anas Urbaningrum	0 / 580		326,800	0.22%	Neutral

=== Presidential election results ===
Election	Ballot number	Candidate	Running mate	1st round (Total votes)	Share of votes	Outcome	2nd round (Total votes)	Share of votes	Outcome
2024	Neutral	Neutral							
