= Herman Khaeron =

Indonesian politician (born 1969)

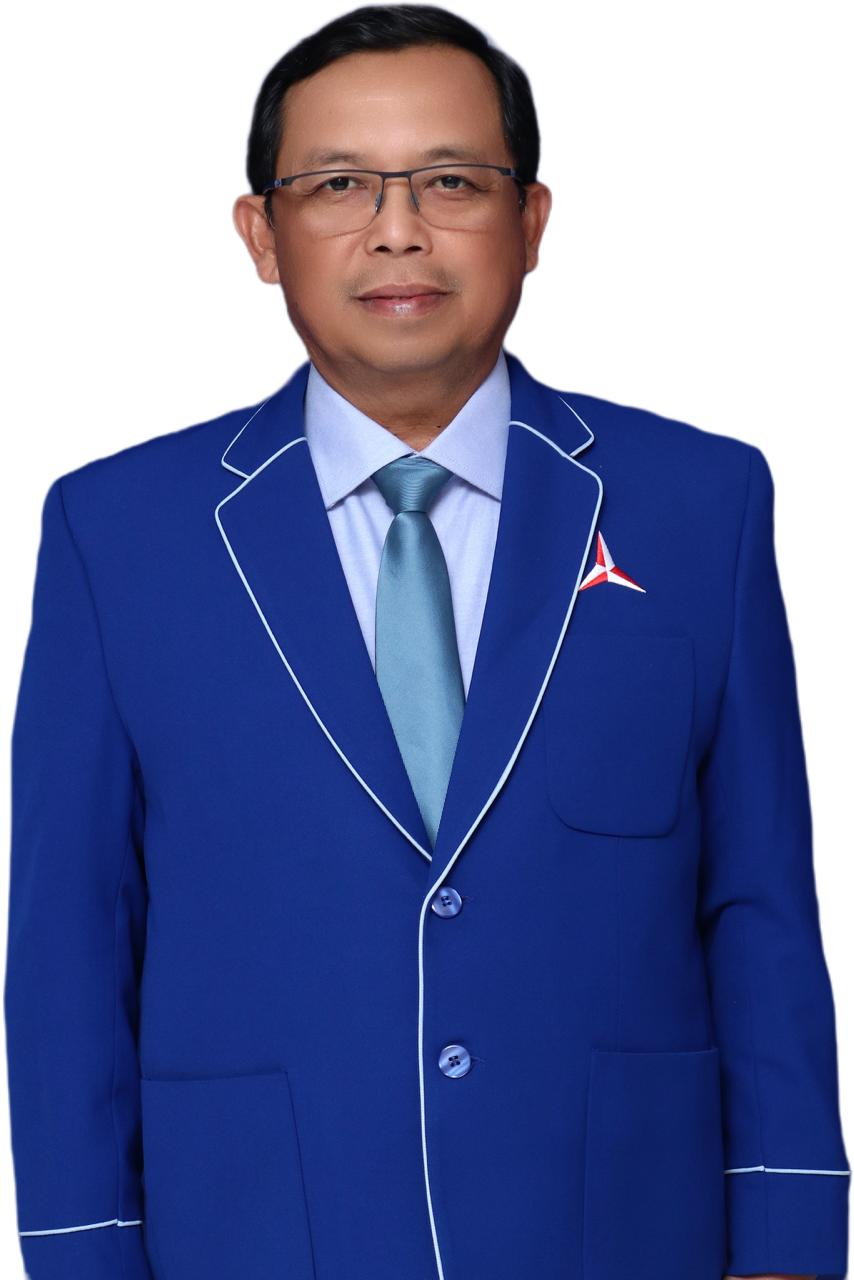
- Herman Khaeron in 2024

Member of the House of Representatives
- Incumbent
- Assumed office 1 October 2009
- Constituency: West Java VIII

Personal details
- Born: 4 May 1969 (age 57)
- Party: Democratic Party

Herman Khaeron (born 4 May 1969) is an Indonesian politician serving as a member of the House of Representatives since 2009. He has served as secretary general of the Democratic Party since 2025.
