= General Elections Commission =

Indonesian elections body

- Komisi Pemilihan Umum
- Emblem of KPU

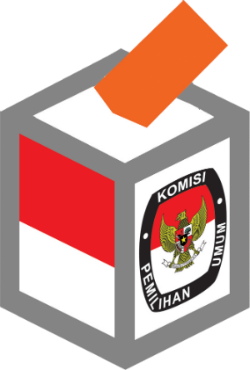
- Symbol for elections held by KPU

Agency overview
- Formed: February 1, 1999
- Preceding agency: General Elections Institution
- Jurisdiction: Indonesia
- Headquarters: Jalan Imam Bonjol No. 29, Jakarta 10310
- Agency executives: Mochammad Afifuddin, S.Th.I, M.Si., Chairman; Bernad Darmawan Sutrisno, M.Si., Secretary-general
- Key document: Law No. 2/2017
- Website: kpu.go.id

The General Elections Commission (Indonesian: Komisi Pemilihan Umum, abbreviated as KPU) is the body that organises elections in Indonesia. Its responsibilities include deciding which parties can contest elections, organising the voting and announcing the results and seats won in the various branches of the government.

== History ==
Following the fall of President Suharto and the end of Indonesia's authoritarian New Order, as a result of public pressure, President Habibie brought forward the general elections planned for 2002 to 1999. On 1 February the People's Representative Council passed Law No. 3/1999 on the General Election, which mandated the establishment of a "free and independent General Elections Commission comprising members of political parties and the government" to oversee the elections. The commission was then established with 53 members and former home affairs minister Rudini as chair. As a result of further public pressure, the government appointed five independent people as its representatives, including noted human rights lawyer Adnan Buyung Nasution. Other independent members included former Supreme Court judge Adi Andojo Soetjipto and political commentator Andi Mallarangeng. The 1999 elections were held on 7 June, and were a success thanks to the management of the KPU, although 27 of the 48 parties contesting the election (all but one of which won less than 0.7% of the vote) refused to sign the KPU document reporting the results. The KPU passed the problem on to President Habibie, who declared the results valid on 26 July.

The second incarnation of the KPU was established on 11 April 2001 to organise the 2004 elections. This time, however, the People's Representative Council (DPR) passed Law No. 4/2000, which stipulated that the KPU members be made up of nonpartisan individuals from academia and NGOs. In 2007, the People's Representative Council (DPR) passed Law No. 22/2007, which stipulated that members of the KPU serve a five-year term. It also stated that members of the KPU would be chosen by a selection committee that together with the president would put forward a list of names to the DPR, which would conduct a fit and proper test. As a result of this process, which lasted from 21 to 30 August 2007, the initial 45 candidates were whittled down to 21, and a vote was taken by the DPR to decide on the final membership. The seven people chosen for the 2007–2012 term KPU were members of regional KPUs, academics, researchers, and bureaucrats.

== Headquarters ==
KPU central headquarters is located in a building on Jalan Imam Bonjol 29, Central Jakarta. The building, designed by architect A.W. Gmelig Meyling, was completed in 1955 and was among the first to be built in the post-war architecture style in Indonesia. It was described as "impressive" at its completion. The building was originally used for the office of the National Horticulture Centre of the Ministry of Agriculture.

KPU also has its local offices in all provinces, cities, and regencies throughout Indonesia except Aceh, where it took a name Independent Elections Commission (Komisi Independen Pemilihan or KIP) with its own structure and regulation.

== Current membership ==
On 12 April 2022, President Joko Widodo, inaugurated members of KPU and Bawaslu for a term of 2022–2027. These are the current members (commissioners) of KPU:

Commissioners	Position	Experience
Hasyim Asy'ari	Chairman	Member of KPU Indonesia (2017–2022)
Betty Epsilon Idroos	Members	Chairman of KPU Jakarta (2018–2023)
Idham Holik	Members	Member of KPU West Java (2018–2023)
Mochammad Afifuddin	Members	Member of Bawaslu Indonesia (2017–2022)
Yulianto Sudrajat	Members	Chair of KPU Central Java (2018–2023)
Parsadaan Harahap	Members	Chair of Bawaslu Bengkulu (2017–2022)
August Mellaz	Members	Director of Sindikasi Pemilu dan Demokrasi

== List of chairmen ==
No.	Name	Period	Term	Commissioners	Elections
1	Rudini	1999–2001	1	Rudini; Adnan Buyung Nasution; Harun Alrasid; Adi Andojo Soetjipto; Andi Mallarangeng; 48 other members	1999
2	Nazaruddin Sjamsuddin	2001–2005	2	Nazaruddin Sjamsuddin; Ramlan Surbakti; Mulyana W. Kusumah; Daan Dimara; Rusada Kantaprawira; Budidarmawan Prasojo; Anas Urbaningrum; Chusnul Mar'iyah; F. X. Mudji Sutrisno; Hamid Awaluddin; Valina Singka Subekti	2004
–	Ramlan Surbakti	2005–2007	2	Nazaruddin Sjamsuddin; Ramlan Surbakti; Mulyana W. Kusumah; Daan Dimara; Rusada Kantaprawira; Budidarmawan Prasojo; Anas Urbaningrum; Chusnul Mar'iyah; F. X. Mudji Sutrisno; Hamid Awaluddin; Valina Singka Subekti	2004
3	Abdul Hafiz Anshari	2007–2012	3	Abdul Hafiz Anshari; Endang Sulastri; Sri Nuryanti; I Gusti Putu Artha; Abdul Aziz; Syamsul Bahri; Andi Nurpati	2009
4	Husni Kamil Manik (Note: died in office)	2012–2016	4	Husni Kamil Manik; Arief Budiman; Hadar Nafis Gumay; Ida Budhiati; Sigit Pamungkas; Juri Adriantoro; Ferry Rizkiyansyah	2014
–	Hadar Nafis Gumay	2016	4	Husni Kamil Manik; Arief Budiman; Hadar Nafis Gumay; Ida Budhiati; Sigit Pamungkas; Juri Adriantoro; Ferry Rizkiyansyah	2014
5	Juri Adriantoro	2016–2017	4	Husni Kamil Manik; Arief Budiman; Hadar Nafis Gumay; Ida Budhiati; Sigit Pamungkas; Juri Adriantoro; Ferry Rizkiyansyah	2014
6	Arief Budiman (Note: removed)	2017–2021	5	Arief Budiman; Evi Novida Manik; Hasyim Asy'ari; Wahyu Setiawan; Viryan; Pramono Tantowi; Ilham Saputra	2019
7	Ilham Saputra	2021–2022	5	Arief Budiman; Evi Novida Manik; Hasyim Asy'ari; Wahyu Setiawan; Viryan; Pramono Tantowi; Ilham Saputra	2019
8	Hasyim Asy'ari (Note: dismissed on 3 July 2024 due to sexual abuse allegations)	2022–2024	6	Hasyim Asy'ari; Betty Epsilon Idroos; Idham Holik; Mochammad Afifuddin; Yulianto Sudrajat; Parsadaan Harahap; August Mellaz	2024
9	Mochammad Afifuddin (Note: acting before 28 July 2024)	2024–	6	Hasyim Asy'ari; Betty Epsilon Idroos; Idham Holik; Mochammad Afifuddin; Yulianto Sudrajat; Parsadaan Harahap; August Mellaz	2024

== See also ==
- General Election Supervisory Agency
- Elections in Indonesia
