= Democratic Party (Indonesia) =

Political party in Indonesia

Democratic Party Partai Demokrat
- Abbreviation: PD
- General Chairman: Agus Harimurti Yudhoyono
- Secretary-General: Herman Khaeron
- DPR group leader: Edhie Baskoro Yudhoyono
- Founders: Susilo Bambang Yudhoyono; Vence Rumangkang; Subur Budhisantoso
- Founded: 9 September 2001; 25 years ago
- Headquarters: Jakarta
- Youth wing: Generasi Muda Demokrat (Democratic Young Generation); Komite Nasional Pemuda Demokrat (National Committee of Democratic Youth)
- Women's wing: Srikandi Demokrat (Democratic Sikhandi)
- Membership (2022): 345,359
- Ideology: Pancasila; Indonesian nationalism Economic liberalism Neoliberalism; Pluralism; Secularism; Constitutionalism; Populism; Centrism; Technocratism
- Political position: Social: Centre; Fiscal: Centre-right
- National affiliation: Advanced Indonesia Coalition Former: Onward Indonesia Coalition; (2024); Coalition of Change for Unity; (2023); Just and Prosperous Indonesia Coalition; (2018–2019); Red-White Coalition; (2014); Joint Secretariat; (2009–2014); People's Coalition; (2004–2009)
- Colours: Blue
- Slogan: Nasionalis, Religius (Nationalist, Religious)
- Anthem: Hymne Partai Demokrat (Democratic Party Hymn); Mars Partai Demokrat (Democratic Party March)
- Ballot number: 14
- DPR: 44 / 580
- DPRD I: 206 / 2,372
- DPRD II: 1,479 / 17,510

Website
- www.demokrat.or.id

The Democratic Party (Indonesian: Partai Demokrat, lit. 'Democrats' Party', sometimes abbreviated to PD) is a centre to centre-right nationalist political party in Indonesia. Currently, it holds 44 seats in the House of Representatives. It is led by Agus Harimurti Yudhoyono, the son of Susilo Bambang Yudhoyono, who served as the President of Indonesia from 2004 to 2014.

Founded in September 2001 as the political vehicle of Susilo Bambang Yudhoyono, the party gained its initial parliamentary representation following the 2004 legislative election, and SBY was elected as president. It then became one of the major parties in SBY's governing coalition. In 2009, the party assumed power by winning the majority of votes in the legislative election and became the ruling and largest party in the DPR, with SBY re-elected for his second term. In 2014, the party performed poorly in the legislative election, losing half of its seats in the DPR and subsequently served as the opposition to the Joko Widodo (Jokowi) administration. In the 2020 party congress, AHY was elected as the chairman. In 2024, it joined the government coalition and AHY was appointed as the Minister of Agrarian Affairs and Spatial Planning.

== History ==
=== Origins ===
The 2001 Special Session of the People's Consultative Assembly (MPR) resulted in Megawati Sukarnoputri's election as Indonesia's president, creating a vice president vacancy. Susilo Bambang Yudhoyono (SBY), a candidate, lost to Hamzah Haz. Yudhoyono's popularity, evident in his vice presidential bid, prompted supporter Vence Rumangkang to propose forming a party for the 2004 elections. Yudhoyono approved and delegated party formation to Rumangkang.

SBY himself did not directly participate in the creation of the party because of his duty as Coordinating Ministry for Political and Security Affairs, although his wife Ani Yudhoyono claimed a leadership position. The party was formed by intellectual and academic circles. SBY himself would be involved in the creation of the party's ideology, policy platforms, and even the party's symbols, hymn and march.

From 12 to 19 August 2001, Rumangkang, with Yudhoyono's input, finalized the party's outline. With 99 declarators forming the Democratic Party on 9 September 2001 (Yudhoyono's 52nd birthday), the Democratic Party was declared, registered at the Ministry of Law and Human Rights on 10 September 2001, and Subur Budhisantoso was elected party chairman.

=== 2004–2014: The Yudhoyono administration and largest party status ===
The party won 7.5% share of votes and won 57 out of 560 seats in the People's Representative Council (DPR) in the 2004 legislative election and finished in fifth place overall. The party nominated Yudhoyono as its presidential candidate, with Jusuf Kalla as the vice presidential candidate. In this, they were also supported by the Crescent Star Party and Indonesian Justice and Unity Party. Yudhoyono and Kalla won the first round of elections in July 2004 with 33.6% of the votes and would go on to win 60.1% in the run-offs, thereby securing Yudhoyono's election as president. In May 2005, the party held its first party congress, during which Hadi Utomo was elected as chairman. Nevertheless, the highest authority in the Party remained with Yudhoyono, who was elected was chairman of the advisory board (Dewan Pembina).

The party came first in the 2009 legislative election with 20.9 percent of the votes, making it the largest party in the DPR, with 148 seats, just over one quarter of the total. Yudhoyono won the election, with former governor of Bank Indonesia, Boediono, as vice presidential candidate, with a total tally of 60.8% in first round of runoff system election, beating former president Megawati and incumbent vice-president Kalla. After the resignation of Anas Urbaningrum, the party held an extraordinary congress on 30 March 2013 in Bali to fill the chairmanship. Yudhoyono ran unopposed and was unanimously elected after no other party members decided to run.

For the 2014 legislative election, the party set a target of 15% of the national vote, less than its 2009 share. One reason the party expected its vote to fall was that Yudhoyono would not able to run for president, having served the two terms allowed for in the constitution. However, the party won only 10.19%, losing over half of its seats in the legislature.

=== Post–2014: AHY chairmanship and internal conflict ===
For the 2019 legislative election, the party initially set a target of 15%, but later changed the target to 10% of the national vote. The party managed to gain 7.77% of the vote, losing some seats in the legislature. On 15 March 2020, Agus Harimurti Yudhoyono (AHY), who had previously commanded the Joint Task Command (Kogasma) during the 2019 general election, was elected as the new chairman, replacing his father.

On 5 March 2021, an unauthorized extraordinary congress in Deli Serdang convened by some party members elected Moeldoko as the new chairman, contrary to the 2020 congress that elected AHY as the chairman until 2025. Former chairman Susilo Bambang Yudhoyono opposed the congress, arguing it was unlawful, as neither the party's high council nor majority of its regional branches had requested it. AHY claimed Moeldoko's election was illegal, asserting himself as the legitimate party leader. On 31 March 2021, the government confirmed the extraordinary congress result as illegitimate, affirming AHY as the rightful chairman of the party.

Entering the beginning of 2023, the Democratic Party through its decision chose to nominate Anies Baswedan to become a presidential candidate. Apart from that, the Democrats also nominated their general chairman, Agus Harimurti Yudhoyono, to be Anies' running mate. However shockingly, Anies selected Muhaimin Iskandar from the National Awakening Party (PKB) after the latter left Prabowo Subianto's Advanced Indonesia Coalition. As the result of Muhaimin's appointment as Anies' running mate, AHY and the Democratic Party withdrew their support and left their coalition. After their exit, the Democratic Party was approached by PDI-P who is hoping for AHY to back Ganjar Pranowo as Hasto Kristiyanto claimed intense communications are underway. The Democrats also got approached by the Advanced Indonesia Coalition as Prabowo held a meeting together with his father in Cikeas. After many considerations, on 21 September 2023 in Jakarta Convention Center, AHY and the Democratic Party declared to back Prabowo Subianto in his presidential campaign. Ironically, both AHY and Moeldoko supported the same candidate for the 2024 presidential election.

== Political identities ==
=== Ideology ===
The 2008 Law on Political Parties states that political parties are allowed to include specific characteristics that reflect their political aspirations, as long as they do not contradict Pancasila and the 1945 Constitution. As per Articles 2 and 3 of its constitution and bylaws (AD/ART), the Democratic Party is founded on Pancasila and "nationalist-religious" is its slogan. It views attempts to clash nationalism and religion as incorrect and misleading. Outsider views on the party's political orientation vary. Academics and domestic observers classified it as a nationalist party, while their international counterparts described it as a secular-nationalist, conservative, or national-liberal party. Its political leaning has been described as centrist, centre-right, or catch-all.

== Leaders ==
| No. | Name | Constituency / title | Term of office | | Image | Election results |
| No. | Name | Constituency / title | Took office | Left office | Image | Election results |
|---|---|---|---|---|---|---|
General Chairmen of the Democratic Party (2001–present)
| 1 | Subur Budhisantoso (born 1937) | — | 10 September 2001 | 23 May 2005 | | 2001 Unopposed |
| 2 | Hadi Utomo (born 1945) | – | 23 May 2005 | 23 May 2010 | | 2005 1st Round Hadi Utomo – 264; Subur Budhisantoso – 106; Surato Siswodihardjo – 72; Agus Abubakar Arsa – ✗ Hamidah Hamid – ✗ Sutan Bhatoegana – ✗ Nurhayati Assegaf – ✗ Ahmad Mubarok – ✗ 2005 2nd Round Hadi Utomo – 302; Subur Budhisantoso – 108; Surato Siswodihardjo – 39 |
| 3 | Anas Urbaningrum (born 1969) | Rep for East Java VI | 23 May 2010 | 30 March 2013 (Note: Urbaningrum was resigned from his leadership position on 23 February 2013 following being suspected of involvement in an alleged corruption case on 23 February. The position was taken over by the leader of party's supreme assembly, Susilo Bambang Yudhoyono, by establishing efforts to save the party. However, Urbaningrum's status as general chairman was maintained by Yudhoyono until the extraordinary party congress was held.) | | 2010 1st Round Anas Urbaningrum – 236; Marzuki Alie – 209; Andi Mallarangeng – 82 2010 2nd Round Anas Urbaningrum – 280; Marzuki Alie – 248 |
| – | Susilo Bambang Yudhoyono (born 1949) Acting | President of Indonesia | 23 February 2013 | 30 March 2013 (Note: On his government, Susilo Bambang Yudhoyono assumed the mandate of President of Indonesia when he began leading the party. He did not explicitly coordinate the party's day-to-day operations. Yudhoyono emphasized that his chairmanship was temporary and intended to "save and consolidate the party." To carry out organizational duties, Yudhoyono assigned Syarifuddin Hasan, also a minister in his cabinet, as the daily chairman. This also applies to the advisory board, which is led daily by Evert Ernest Mangindaan.) | | |
| 4 | Susilo Bambang Yudhoyono (born 1949) | President of Indonesia (Note: until 20 October 2014) | 30 March 2013 | 15 March 2020 | | 2015 Unopposed |
| 5 | Agus Yudhoyono (born 1978) | Coordinating Minister for Infrastructure and Regional Development | 12 March 2020 (Note: A year after leading the party, Agus Yudhoyono faced an internal conflict that triggered dual leadership within the party after Moeldoko was elected as the new general chairman through an extraordinary congress.) | Incumbent | | 2020 Unopposed 2025 Unpposed |

== Controversies ==
=== Corruption Cases ===
Muhammad Nazaruddin was dismissed by the Democratic Party's ethics council from his position as party treasurer in May 2011 due to his involvement in a corruption case, but he remained a legislator in the House of Representatives. Constitutional Court chief Mahfud MD said Nazaruddin had given S$120,000 ($96,900) to Constitutional Court secretary general Janedri M. Gaffar in 2010. The money was later returned to Nazaruddin. On 24 May 2011, Mahfud reported Nazaruddin to the Corruption Eradication Commission for allegedly trying to bribe a court official.

On 20 April 2012, Nazaruddin was convicted of corruption and sentenced to four years and 10 months in prison and fined approximately US$22,000. He was found guilty of accepting over 4.68 billion rupiah in return for helping rig the tenders for an athletes' village built for the Southeast Asian Games in South Sumatra in November 2011.

Nazaruddin was arrested by Interpol in Cartagena, Colombia in August 2011, having fled Indonesia after being named a suspect in the case.

The Nazaruddin scandal was followed by the naming of a number of high-ranking party officials and legislators as suspects in numerous graft cases. Most prominent among them was Youth and Sports Minister Andi Mallarangeng, who resigned in December 2012. Mallarangeng was named suspect in the same athlete training camp case which had involved Nazaruddin. Business tycoon Siti Hartati Murdaya, who had served on the party's advisory board, resigned in August 2012 after becoming embroiled in a corruption case for which she was later jailed.

=== #ShameOnYouSBY ===
In 2014, the emergence of the hashtag #ShameOnYouSBY and several other hashtags on Twitter attacking the President Susilo Bambang Yudhoyono and the Democratic Party occurred due to the walk out of most members of the Democratic Party faction during the plenary session for the ratification of the Regional Election Law which resulted in the election of regional heads such as governors, regents and mayors by the Regional Representative Council. It was later revealed that there was a miscommunication between the President and his party fraction as the parliamentary leader of the Democratic Party, Nurhayati Ali Assegaf misread the President's message from "all out" to "walk out".

== Election results ==
=== Legislative election results ===
| Election | Ballot number | Leader | Seats | | Total votes | Share of votes | Outcome of election |
| Election | Ballot number | Leader | No. | ± | Total votes | Share of votes | Outcome of election |
|---|---|---|---|---|---|---|---|
| 2004 | 9 | Subur Budhisantoso | 55 / 550 | | 8,455,225 | 7.45% | Governing coalition |
| 2009 | 31 | Hadi Utomo | 150 / 560 | ▲95 | 21,703,137 | 20.85% | Governing coalition |
| 2014 | 7 | Susilo Bambang Yudhoyono | 61 / 560 | ▼89 | 12,728,913 | 10.19% | Neutral |
| 2019 | 14 | Susilo Bambang Yudhoyono | 54 / 575 | ▼7 | 10,876,507 | 7.77% | Opposition (2019–2024) |
| 2019 | 14 | Susilo Bambang Yudhoyono | 54 / 575 | ▼7 | 10,876,507 | 7.77% | Governing coalition (2024) |
| 2024 | 14 | Agus Yudhoyono | 44 / 580 | ▼10 | 11,283,053 | 7.43% | Governing coalition |

=== Presidential election results ===
| Election | Ballot number | Candidate | Running mate | 1st round (Total votes) | Share of votes | Outcome | 2nd round (Total votes) | Share of votes | Outcome |
|---|---|---|---|---|---|---|---|---|---|
| 2004 | 4 | **Susilo Bambang Yudhoyono** | Jusuf Kalla | 39,838,184 | 33.57% | **Runoff** | 69,266,350 | 60.62% | Elected |
| 2009 | 2 | **Susilo Bambang Yudhoyono** | Boediono | 73,874,562 | 60.80% | Elected | | | |
| 2014 | 1 | Prabowo Subianto | Hatta Rajasa | 62,576,444 | 46.85% | Lost | | | |
| 2019 | 2 | Prabowo Subianto | Sandiaga Uno | 68,650,239 | 44.50% | Lost | | | |
| 2024 | 2 | Prabowo Subianto | Gibran Rakabuming Raka | 96,214,691 | 58.59% | Elected | | | |

Note: Bold text indicates the party member
