= Pudjo Prasetyo =

Indonesian diplomat and military officer

Ambassador of Indonesia to Vietnam
- In office 1982–1986
- President: Suharto
- Preceded by: Ahmad Soedarsono
- Succeeded by: John Louhanapessy

Ambassador of Indonesia to Laos
- In office 3 May 1980 – 1982
- President: Suharto
- Preceded by: Suffri Jusuf
- Succeeded by: Bambang S. Kusumonegoro

Personal details
- Born: June 14, 1925 Yogyakarta, Dutch East Indies

Military service
- Allegiance: Indonesia
- Branch/service: Indonesian Army
- Years of service: 1946 – 1980
- Rank: Brigadier general
- Unit: Quartermaster

Pudjo Prasetyo (born 14 June 1925) is an Indonesian military officer and diplomat who served as Indonesia's ambassador to Laos from 1980 to 1982 and to Vietnam from 1982 to 1986. Prior to his ambassadorships, he took on roles as military attaché in North Vietnam and as the last acting director general of the International Commission of Control and Supervision.

== Early life and education ==
Born in Yogyakarta on 14 June 1925, Pudjo completed basic education at the Hollandsch Inlandsche Kweekschool from 1931 to 1938 and Hogere Burgerschool from 1938 before being cut short due to the Japanese occupation of the Dutch East Indies in 1942.

== Military career ==
Pudjo joined the Indonesian Army in 1946 during the Indonesian National Revolution. After the war, he completed his high school in 1951 before attending a series of military training in the United States. He attended a basic and advanced training for quartermaster officer at Fort Lee, Virginia, in 1953 and 1955, respectively. Following several military assignments, he pursued further military education at the Frunze Military Academy from 1962 to 1963. Upon returning to Indonesia, he was stationed at the Cenderawasih Military Regional Command, located at the newly annexed Indonesian province of Irian Jaya, from 1964 to 1965. Between 1966 and 1967, Pudjo became the deputy chief of staff of the Tanjungpura Regional Military Command in Pontianak.

In the midst of the Vietnam War, Pudjo, then a colonel, served as Indonesia's military attaché at the embassy in North Vietnam, and then in Cambodia, from 1968 to 1971. According to Central Intelligence Agency reports, Pudjo received information from his Eastern Bloc counterparts regarding the presence of detained US soldiers there. He returned for domestic assignment as the army director of logistics administration from 1971 to 1973, before being promoted as deputy assistant for logistics to the Army chief of staff with the rank of brigadier general. He was then assigned to Indonesia's Garuda Contingent in Vietnam in 1974, and by 1975 he became the acting director general of the International Commission of Control and Supervision (ICCS). Pudjo served until Indonesia's withdrawal from the ICCS on 26 April that year, and he was not replaced until ICCS was dissolved after the Fall of Saigon four days later.

In the same year, Pudjo joined the foreign ministry and became the chief of the ministry's organizational affairs. On 3 May 1980, Pudjo was sworn in as Indonesia's ambassador to Laos. He presented his credentials to president Souphanouvong on 6 August and met with premier Nouhak Phoumsavanh nine days later. At the end of his tenure, he paid farewell calls to several key Laotian officials. He visited Souphanouvong on 7 August and deputy prime minister Phoumi Vongvichit and Sali Vongkhamsao on 21 August 1982. He was then reassigned to Vietnam on the same year after his approval as Indonesia's ambassador to Vietnam was announced by the foreign minister on 6 June that year. Shortly before the end of his term, in January 1986 he briefed president Suharto regarding bilateral relations with Vietnam, in which he stated Indonesia's plans to sell a hundred thousand tonnes of rice to Vietnam and on Vietnam's wishes for Indonesia to act as a mediator regarding its conflict with Cambodia. Pudjo departed Hanoi on the 27th of November that year.

== Religious life ==
Pudjo is a Christian. In 1988, he was appointed as Indonesia's delegate to a consultative meeting for heads of churches in ASEAN countries.
