= Rahardjo Prodjopradoto =

Indonesian politician (1921–1978)

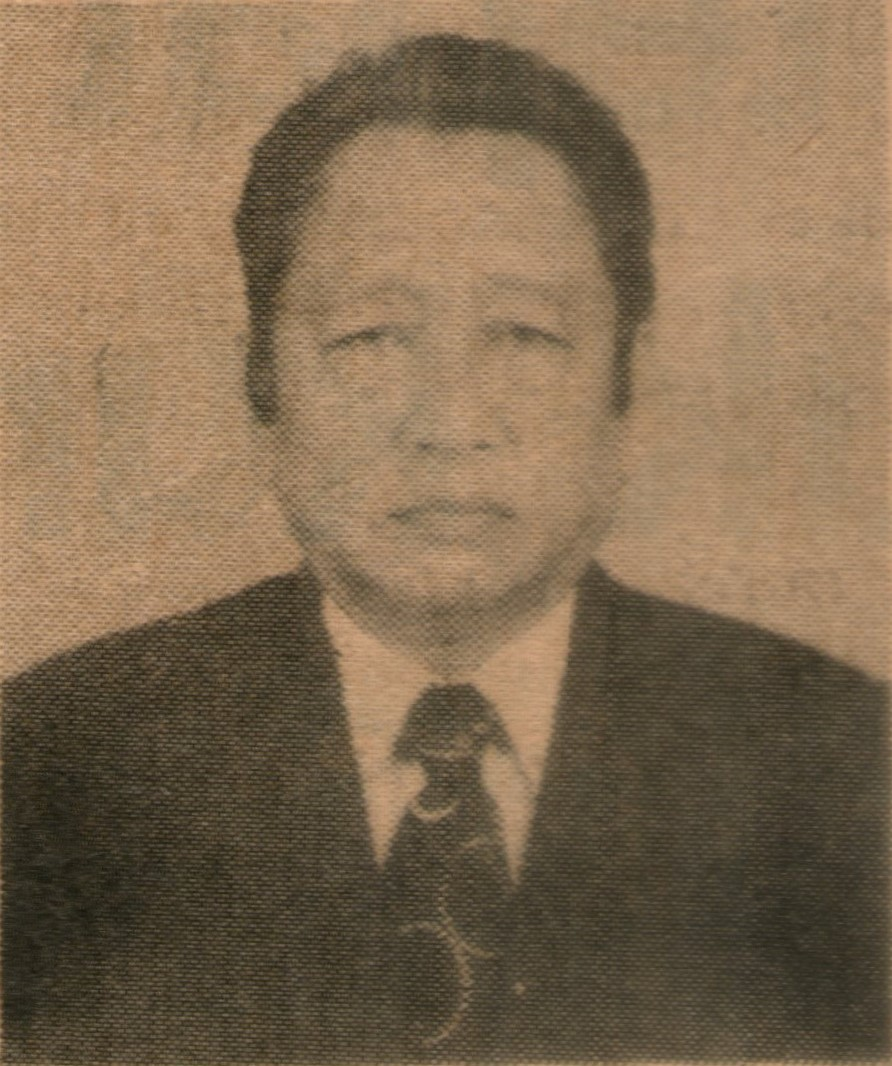

Personal details
- Born: August 10, 1921 Danukusuman, Serengan, Surakarta, Dutch East Indies
- Died: February 16, 1978 (aged 56) L. Sugiharto Clinic, Tambak Street, Menteng, Central Jakarta, Jakarta, Indonesia
- Cause of death: Heart attack
- Resting place: Kalibata Heroes' Cemetery
- Party: Golkar
- Spouse: Siti Hamoeljani
- Children: 6

Rahardjo Prodjopradoto (August 10, 1921 - February 16, 1978) was an Indonesian politician from the Golkar Party. He was the Vice Chairman of Golkar from 1971 until 1973, and the party's Secretary for Civil Servants from 1973 until his death.

== Early life ==
Prodjopradoto was born on 10 August 1921 in Danukusuman, Surakarta. Prodjopranoto went to the Hollands Indische School (HIS). After finishing his school, Prodjopradoto went to the Muhammadiyah Teacher's School for four years. During his time there, he often preaches to the masses.

== Military career ==
His career in the military began since his youth. In 1946, he became the member of the division staff of the Senopati Surakarta as a Second Lieutenant. In 1950, he was tasked as the commander of the Sukaharjo military division. Fourteen years later, he began to teach in the Navy Staff and Command School (Seskoal) with the rank of Lieutenant Colonel (Letkol).

After being active in the military environment, he began to reduce his activeness by working in the Ministry of Home Affairs since 1966 as a colonel. In 1969, he was promoted as a brigadier general, and six years later as a major general.

== Political career ==
Rahardjo Prodjopradoto was one of the founders of Golkar since he headed the Employee Corps of the Ministry of Home Affairs (Kokar Mendagri), which would later fuse into Golkar. Since 1971, he was the member of the People's Representative Council until his death, and as the Vice General Secretary of Golkar until 1973. After 1973, he was appointed as the Secretary for Civil Servants of Golkar. Due to his religious background, he was entrusted by the leadership to resolve matters about ulama in the organization. (Note: Golkar wasn't officially a party until 1998.)

== Death ==
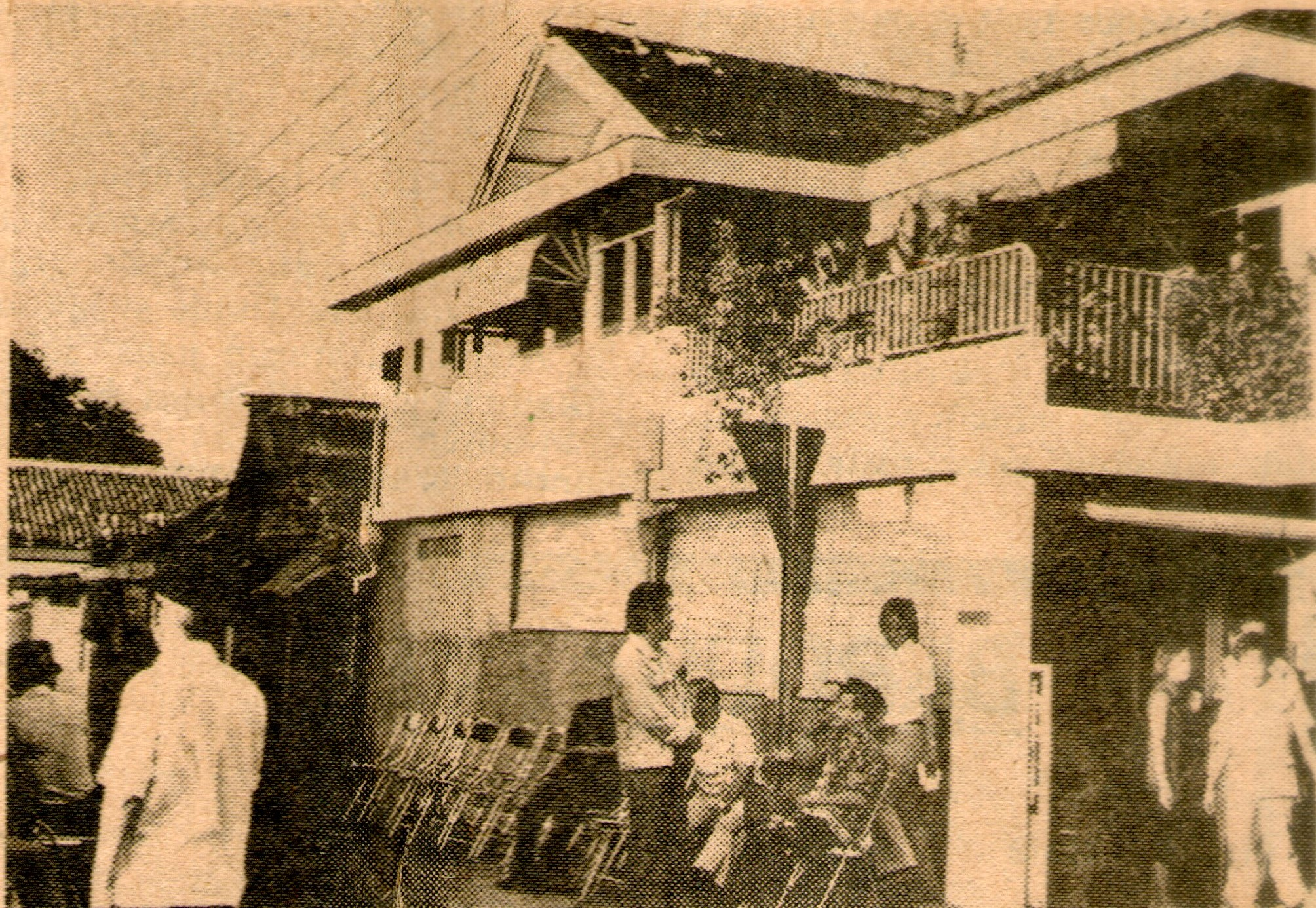
Prodjopradoto's house.

A day before his death, Prodjopradoto kept complaining about his sickness. He went to L. Sugiharto Clinic which is located in Tambak Street to check his condition. Unfortunately, Prodjopradoto died during his checkup. He died at 14.30, on 16 February 1978. According to the doctor, he died due to sudden heart attack.

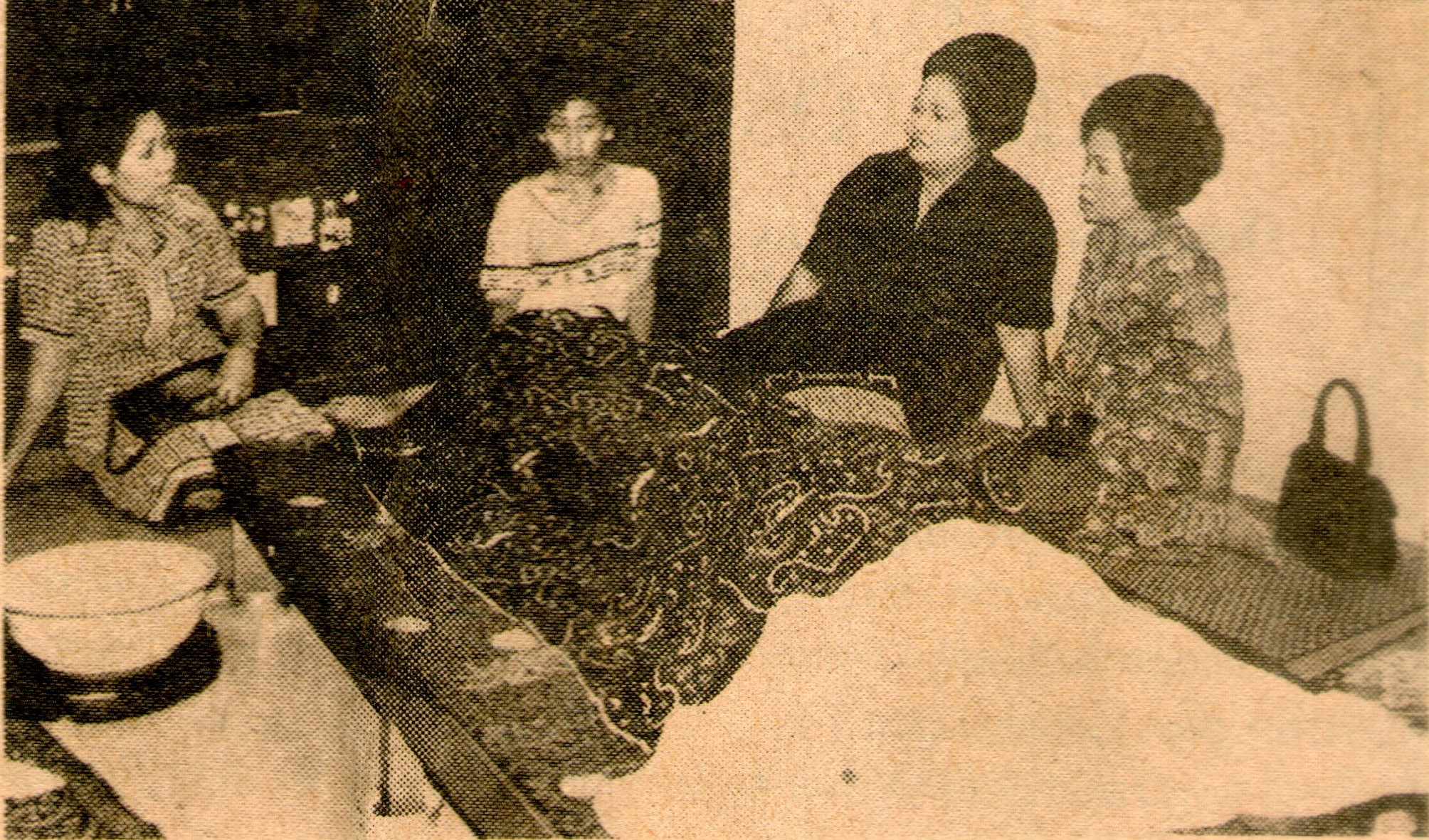
Body of Prodjopradoto in his house.

Several hours after his death, a lot of Golkar officials came to his house to mourn him. Those who came such as Amir Murtono, Sapardjo (general secretary of Golkar), Murdopo (treasurer of Golkar), and A.E. Manihuruk (vice chairman of Golkar).

A day after his death, his body was brought from his home to the DPR-RI building at 08.00. From 09.00 until 09.45, his body was put in the building to be mourned by members of DPR. After 10.00, his body was brought to the Kalibata Heroes' Cemetery to be buried.

== Awards ==
- Satya Lencana Peristiwa Aksi Militer I, II
- Satya Lencana Kesetiaan

== Bibliography ==
- General Elections Institution (1971), Memperkenalkan Anggota-Anggota Dewan Perwakilan Rakjat Hasil Pemilihan Umum 1971, Jakarta
