= Aswismarmo =

Indonesian military general (1925–2011)

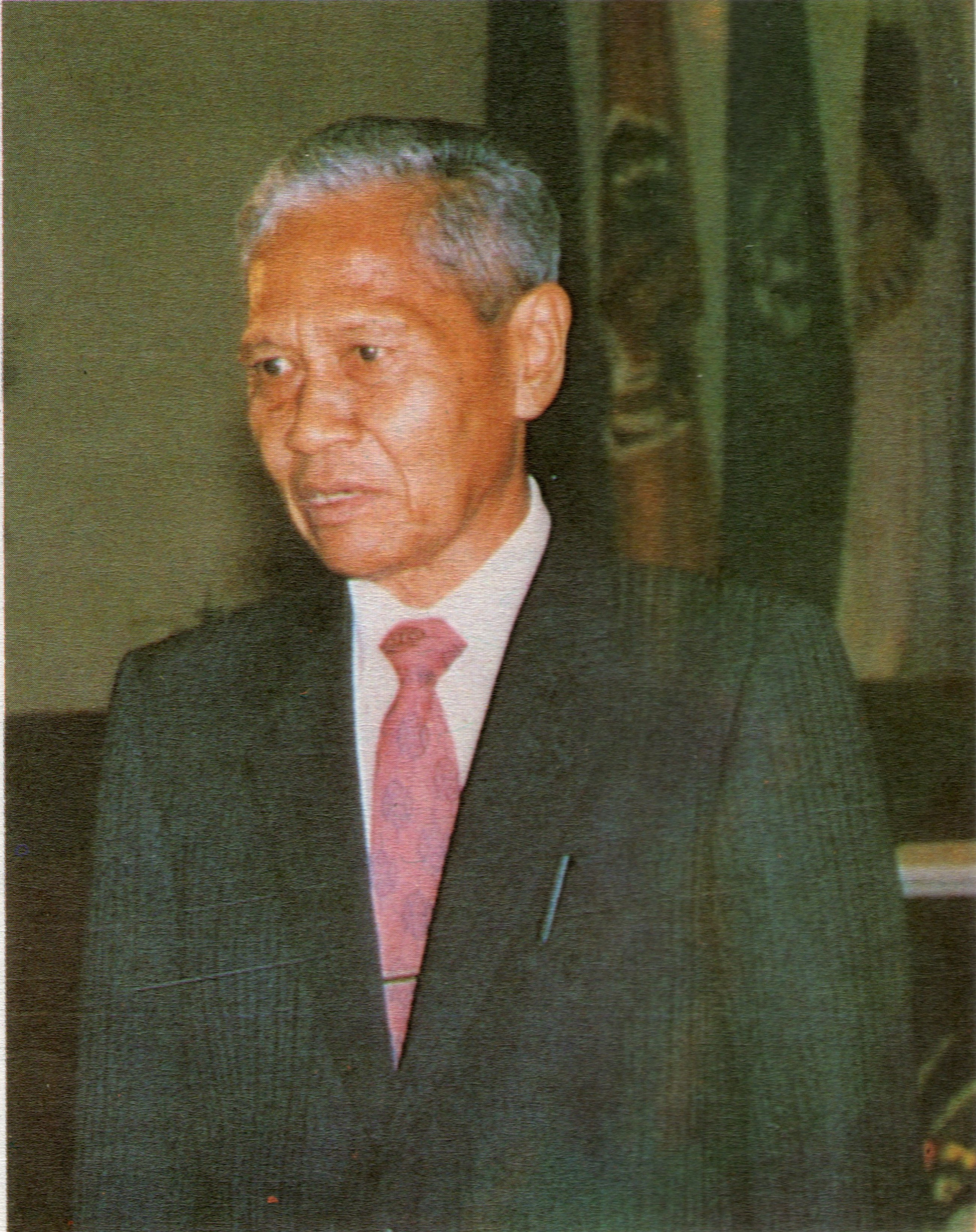

General Secretary of the General Elections Institution
- In office 1983–1987

Member of the People's Consultative Assembly
- In office 1987–1992

Indonesia Ambassador to Vietnam
- In office 17 February 1988 – 15 January 1992
- President: Suharto
- Preceded by: John Louhanapessy
- Succeeded by: Juwana

Indonesia Ambassador to Italy
- In office 17 January 1976 – 14 December 1977
- President: Suharto
- Succeeded by: R. Sri Subyakto

Personal details
- Born: 27 November 1925 Jogjakarta, Dutch East Indies
- Died: 12 January 2011 (aged 85) Jakarta, Indonesia

Aswismarmo (Jogjakarta, Dutch East Indies, 27 November 1925 – Jakarta, Indonesia, 12 January 2011) was an Indonesian Military major general who served as the general secretary of the General Elections Institution from 1983 until 1987.

== Early life ==
Aswismarmo was born on 27 November 1925 in Yogyakarta. He was the son of Djayengdimedjo.

He began his studies by learning at the RK HIS II, which he graduated in 1934, Gout HIK, which he graduated in 1942, and SMT Negeri Yogyakarta, which he graduated in 1945.

== Military career ==
After pursuing civil education, he enrolled in the newly formed Indonesian Armed Forces. He became part of the intelligence service, serving in Okinawa in 1960, and in West Germany since 1961.

After serving in intelligence, he became a teacher in the Officer Advanced Course from 1967, and in the Indonesian Army Command and General Staff College from 1968.

== Political career ==
After retiring from the military, he was offered a position as the ambassador of Indonesia for Italy from 1976 until 1977, and for Vietnam from 1988 until 1992.

On 1983, he was appointed as the general secretary of the Ministry of Home Affairs at that time, Soepardjo Rustam. During his tenure, the 1987 Indonesian legislative election was held. As the general secretary of the Ministry of Home Affairs, he was also the general secretary of the General Elections Institution, which organizes the election.

== Bibliography ==
- General Elections Institution (1988), Buku Pelengkap IX Pemilihan Umum 1987: Ringkasan Riwayat Hidup dan Riwayat Perjuangan Anggota Majelis Permusyawaratan Rakyat Hasil Pemilihan Umum 1987 (in Indonesian), Jakarta
