= John Louhanapessy =

Indonesian diplomat (1929–2015)

Johannes Petrus Louhanapessy
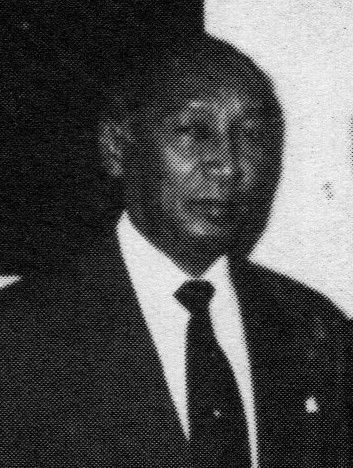

Ambassador of Indonesia to Austria
- In office 1 November 1989 – 1993
- President: Suharto
- Preceded by: Wiryono Sastrohandoyo
- Succeeded by: Agus Tarmidzi

Director General of Political Affairs
- In office 10 May 1988 – 5 January 1990
- Preceded by: Nana Sutresna
- Succeeded by: Wiryono Sastrohandoyo

Ambassador of Indonesia to Vietnam
- In office 30 September 1985 – 1988
- President: Suharto
- Preceded by: Pudjo Prasetyo
- Succeeded by: Aswismarmo

Ambassador of Indonesia to Czechoslovakia
- In office 23 May 1979 – 1982
- President: Suharto
- Preceded by: Aboe Bakar Loebis
- Succeeded by: Zahar Arifin

Personal details
- Born: January 3, 1929 Jakarta, Dutch East Indies
- Died: July 6, 2015 (aged 86)
- Spouse: Ilse Peck
- Children: 3
- Education: Foreign Service Academy

Johannes Petrus Louhanapessy (3 January 1929 – 6 July 2015) was an Indonesian career diplomat who has served as ambassador thrice. He was Indonesia's ambassador to Czechoslovakia from 1979 to 1982, Vietnam from 1985 to 1988, and to Austria from 1989 to 1993. A graduate of the foreign service academy, Louhanapessy had served various positions in the foreign ministry, with his final assignment as the director general of politics from 1988 to 1990.

== Early life and education ==
Born in Jakarta on 3 January 1929, Louhanapessy studied at the foreign service academy from 1949 to 1953. He began his diplomatic career at the protocol bureau of the foreign ministry on the same year after his graduation from the academy. By 1954, he was sent to the embassy in Bonn with the rank of attaché. He was promoted to the diplomatic rank of third secretary sometime during his service in Bonn and received the Verdienstkreuz am Bande from the West German government at the end of his service in 1958.

Louhanapessy returned to Indonesia in 1958 and was assigned as a staff at the Asia Pacific directorate, with responsibilities for South Asia countries. During this period, he undertook a mandatory military training for foreign service officers in 1963. Afterwards, in 1964 he undertook another posting overseas at the embassy in Hanoi, North Vietnam. He started his assignment with the diplomatic rank of second secretary, and was later promoted to first secretary. After Indonesia's ambassador to North Vietnam Soekrisno defected to China following reprisals on the 30 September 1965 Movement, Louhanapessy was named as the chargé d'affaires ad interim of the embassy for a few months. He was then sent to the embassy in Paris in 1966, where he served for two years.

By 1968, Louhanapessy became the chief of South European affairs within the Europe directorate of the foreign ministry. Two years later, his portofolio was switched to East European affairs. During this period, in 1971 Louhanapessy undertook a course for senior diplomats. After four years in the directorate, in 1972 he was sent to the embassy in Vienna as the chief of political affairs with the rank of minister counsellor. On the same year, he received the Decoration of Honour for Services to the Republic of Austria, 5th class (in Silver with Star) for his role in Suharto's state visit to Austria. He was then promoted as deputy chief of mission with the rank of minister. From Vienna, Louhanapessy was appointed as the director for Europe on 17 June 1976, replacing acting officeholder Sabar Padmadisastra.

On 23 May 1979, Louhanapessy was sworn in as ambassador to Czechoslovakia. He received the Civil Servants' Long Service Medal, 1st class in 1980 for his twenty-five years of diplomatic service. After three years, he returned to Jakarta as the foreign ministry's chief of education and training center, serving from 1982 to 1985. He was then appointed as ambassador to Vietnam on 30 September 1985, where he oversaw the provision of humanitarian aid to typhoon refugees in 1986.

Louhanapessy became the foreign ministry's director general of political affairs on 10 May 1988, replacing Nana Sutresna. During his tenure, Louhenapessy was designated as the lead negotiator for talks on normalization of diplomatic relations with China, with discussions regarding the location for the new Chinese embassy, the limitations for the amount of staff assigned to the embassy, and Indonesia's past debts. The series of talks on the matter ended on 9 December, with Louhanapessy announcing plans of meeting between Indonesia's foreign minister Ali Alatas and his Chinese counterpart Qian Qichen. Louhanapessy stated that the meetings went longer than expected due to technical issues, but assured that both parties have agreed on substantial issues. Louhanapessy also played a role in Cambodian–Vietnamese War negotiations, with him as the chairman of the group of Southeast Asian representatives, and on border issues with Papua New Guinea. In this position, he received Order of Diplomatic Service Merit, 2nd class, in 1988 for his works in preparing president Roh Tae-woo's visit to Indonesia on that year.

After about a year in office, Louhanapessy exchanged duties with Wiryono Sastrohandoyo, Indonesia's ambassador to Austria. Louhanapessy became ambassador to Austria on 1 November 1989 before handing over his position to Wiryono on 5 January 1990. He presented his credentials to president Kurt Waldheim on 6 February 1990. Louhanapessy's ambassadorial tenure ended in conjunction with his retirement in 1993.

== Personal life ==
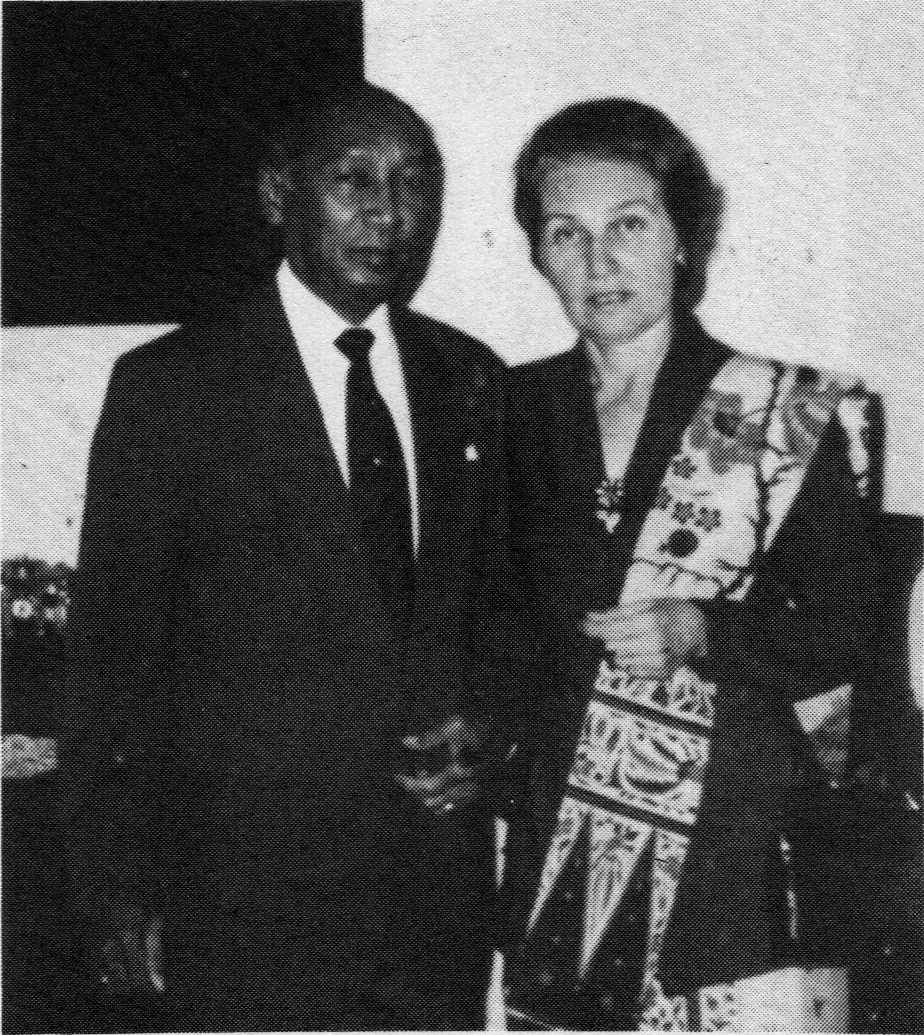
Louhanapessy and Ilse.

Louhanapessy is married to Ilse Peck and has three sons: Peter, Rainer, and Andre. Rainer followed his father's footsteps as a diplomat, with his last posting at the consulate general in Dubai. Louhanapessy speaks Dutch, English, French, and German.

Louhanapessy died on 6 July 2015 and was interred at the San Diego Hills cemetery two days later. His wife died three years later on 23 April 2018.
