= Juwana =

Indonesian diplomat (born 1936)

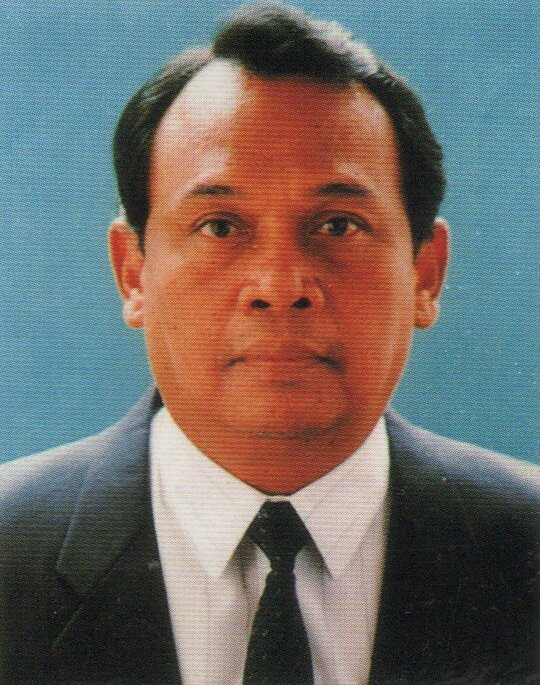

Ambassador of Indonesia to China
- In office 1994–1997
- President: Suharto
- Preceded by: Abdurrahman Gunadirdja
- Succeeded by: Kuntara

Ambassador of Indonesia to Vietnam
- In office 15 January 1992 – 1994
- President: Suharto
- Preceded by: Aswismarmo
- Succeeded by: Djafar Assegaff

Personal details
- Born: September 10, 1936 (age 90) Blora Regency, Dutch East Indies
- Children: 6
- Education: Gadjah Mada University (Drs.); Institut international d'administration publique

Juwana (born 10 September 1936) is an Indonesian career diplomat who served as ambassador to Vietnam from 1992 to 1994 and to China from 1994 to 1997. A Gadjah Mada University graduate, Juwana had been posted in diplomatic missions abroad, including in Phnom Penh, Singapore, New York, Paris, and Geneva.

== Diplomatic career ==
Born in Blora Regency on 10 September 1936, Juwana began working at the education department in 1958. He then studied international relations at the Gadjah Mada University and graduated with a doctorandus in 1964. By the next year he moved to the foreign department as a staff in the Asia Pacific directorate. In 1969, he attended a diplomatic course at the Institut international d'administration publique in Paris, which he completed in 1969. After returning to Jakarta in 1970, Juwana attended a basic course for diplomatic officials, before receiving his first maiden overseas assignment at the embassy in Phnom Penh. He began his service with the diplomatic rank of third secretary before being promoted to second secretary sometime later.

In 1974, Juwana was recalled to the foreign department, where he returned to the Asia Pacific directorate. In 1975, he attended a diplomatic training in Canberra. He was then posted at the embassy in Singapore with the diplomatic rank of first secretary in 1976. From Singapore, Juwana was assigned to the permanent mission to the United Nations in New York in 1978, where he served with the diplomatic rank of counsellor.

Upon serving for four years in New York, Juwana returned to the foreign department, this time as a staff in the directorate of international organizations. He completed his mid-level and senior diplomatic training in 1983 and on the same year was sent to Paris with the diplomatic rank of minister counsellor. He was transferred in 1984 to the permanent mission in Geneva with the same rank. Juwana was then assigned to the Indonesia's ASEAN national secretariat, where he was head of the development and analysis bureau and the socio-cultural bureau in 1988 and 1989, respectively.

On 15 January 1992, Juwana was installed as ambassador to Vietnam. As ambassador, Juwana represented the Indonesian government in tripartite talks with the United Nations High Commissioner for Refugees and the Vietnam government regarding the repatriation of Vietnam War refugees from Galang Island. The Indonesian government instructed the refugees to immediately vacate the island, as it planned to develop the island as part of the Barelang (Batam-Rempang-Galang) bonded zone. Juwana urged the Vietnamese government to speed up the screening process of the refugees.

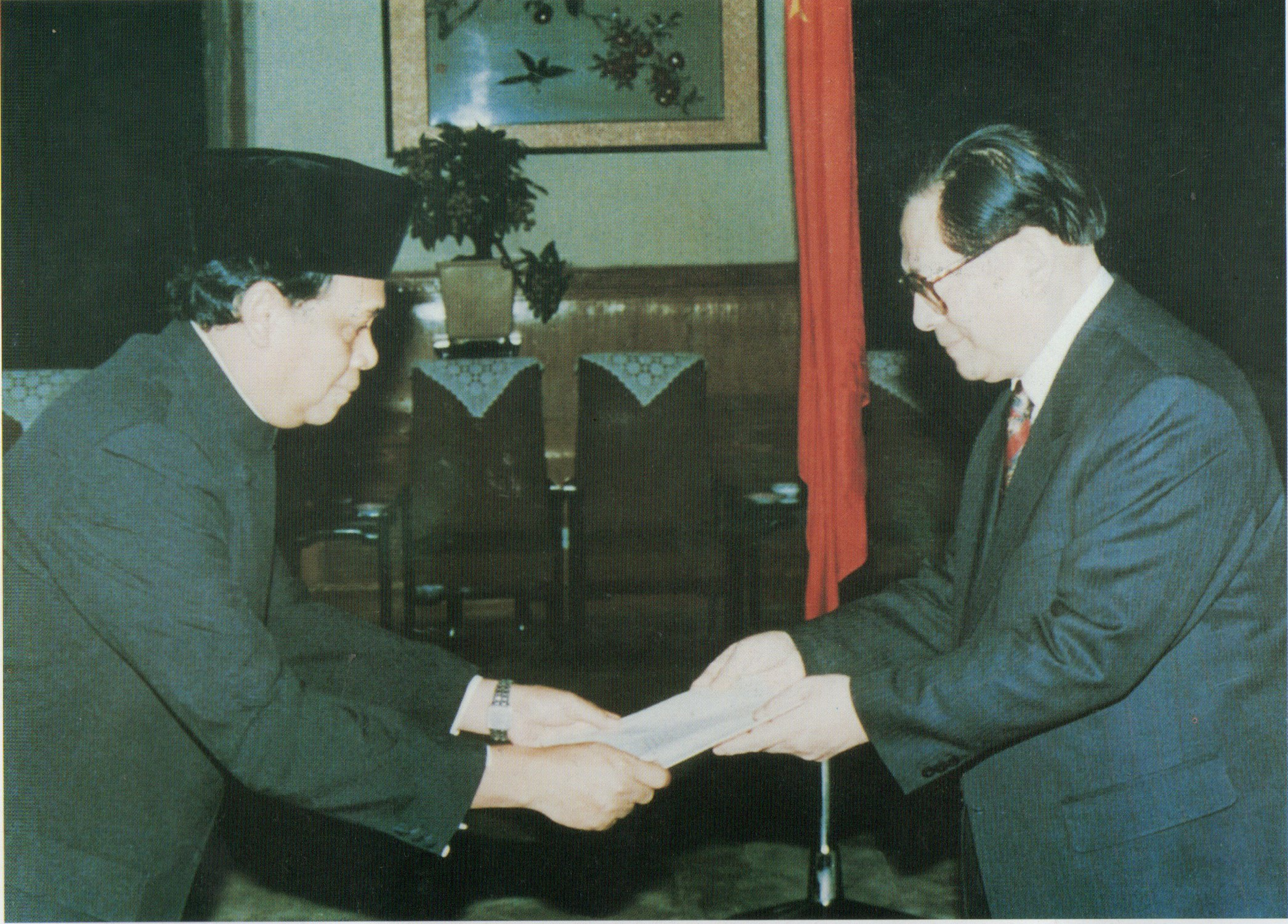
Juwana presenting his credentials to president Jiang Zemin in 1994.

In September 1993 President Suharto decided to nominate Juwana as ambassador to China. The Chinese government approved his nomination in October, and Juwana began serving in China on 4 March 1994. He presented his credentials to president Jiang Zemin on 29 March 1994 and served until 1997. Juwana is also accredited to Marshall Islands—the first since bilateral relations were established in May 1993—and on 18 January 1995 presented his credentials to president Amata Kabua. In March that year, Indonesia's foreign department invited Marshall Islands to take part in technical cooperation programs in information, agriculture, and health, but the country did not send any participants

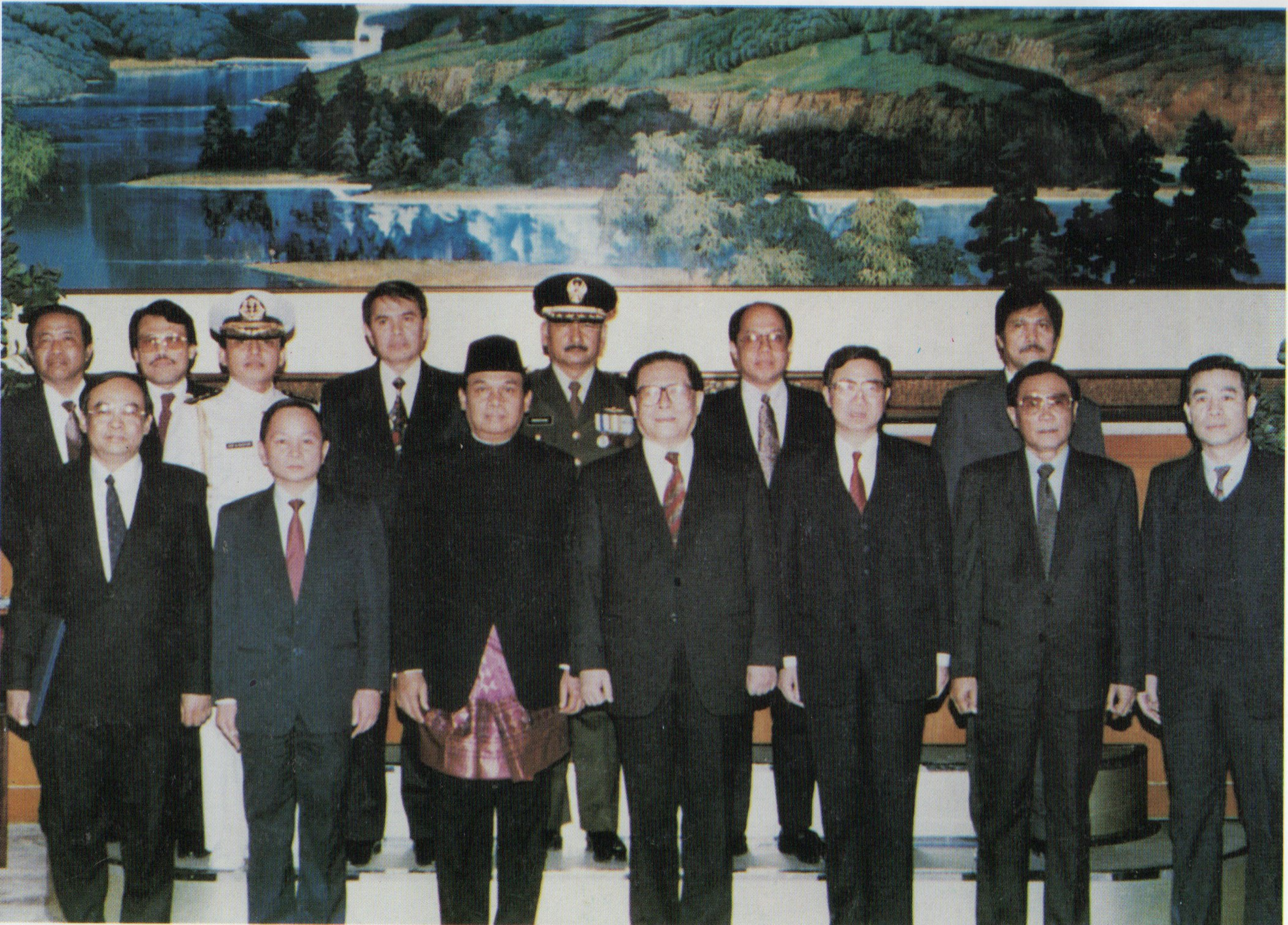
Ambassador Juwana and other embassy staffs posing with Jiang Zemin.

Shortly following his appointment, in April 1994 a labor strike occurred in Medan, which quickly turned into an anti-Chinese riot. The Chinese foreign ministry responded to the riots by hoping and believing the Indonesian side to handle the anti-Chinese riot (correctly)". The "hopes and believes" part of the statement was misquoted by an Associated Press/Reuters reporter as "urging", which provoked a strong response from Juwana. Juwana then held an afternoon tea with the press in early May, in which he accused the press of altering the quote. The agency admitted their mistake after Juwana revealed the embassy owned the original recording of the press conference.

After his ambassadorial tenure, Juwana was entrusted as the deputy chairman of the Indonesia's task force for the 1999 East Timorese independence referendum, along with Major General Hamid Reza Garnadi from the Coordinating Ministry for Political and Security Affairs. Juwana acted as the public face of the task force and frequently gave press conferences on behalf of the chairman. About a week before the referendum, Juwana resigned from his position and returned to Jakarta.

== Personal life ==
Juwana is a Muslim. He is married and has six children.
