= Elections in Indonesia =

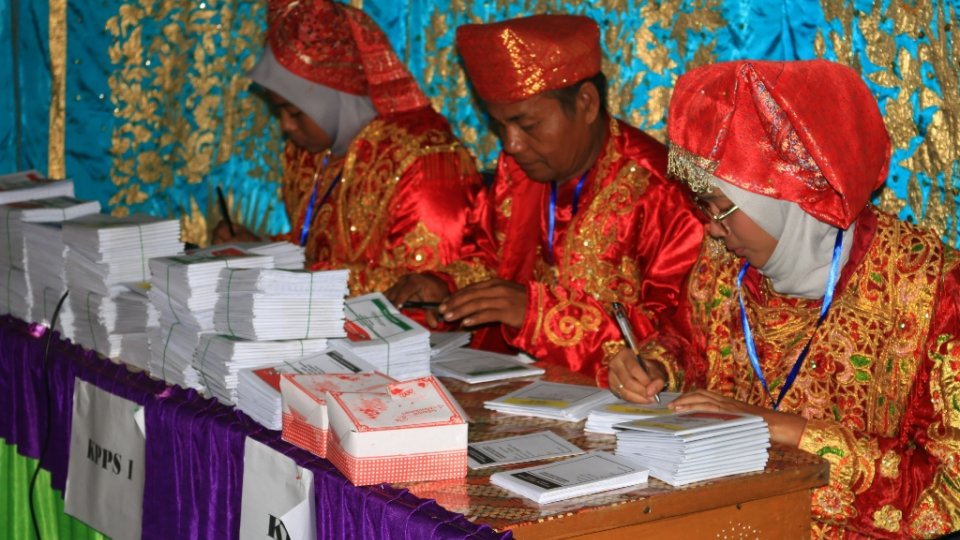
Election workers wearing traditional Minang wedding costumes at a polling station in Pariaman City, West Sumatra, during the 2019 Indonesian general election

Elections in Indonesia have taken place since 1955 to elect a legislature. At a national level, Indonesian people did not elect a head of state– the president – until 2004. Since then, the president is elected for a five-year term, as are the 580-member People's Representative Council (Dewan Perwakilan Rakyat, DPR), the 152-seat Regional Representative Council (Dewan Perwakilan Daerah, DPD) in 2024 general election, in addition to provincial and municipal legislative councils (Dewan Perwakilan Rakyat Daerah Provinsi/Kabupaten/Kota, DPRD).

Members of the People's Representative Council are elected by proportional representation from multi-candidate constituencies. Currently, there are 77 constituencies in Indonesia, and each returns 3-10 Members of Parliament based on population. Under Indonesia's multi-party system, no one party has yet been able to secure an outright majority in a democratic election; parties have needed to work together in coalition governments. Members of the Regional Representative Council are elected by single non-transferable vote. There, Indonesia's 38 provinces treated as constituencies and, regardless of the size and population, every province return four senators.

Starting from the 2015 unified local elections, Indonesia started to elect governors and mayors simultaneously on the same date.

The voting age in Indonesia is 17, but anyone who has an ID card (KTP) can vote since persons under 17 who are or were married can get a KTP. Elections are conducted by the General Elections Commission (KPU) and supervised by the General Election Supervisory Agency (Bawaslu); their activities were overseen by Elections Organizer Honorary Council (DKPP).

== History ==
Elections were first promised for January 1946 by vice-president Hatta on 3 November 1945, a promise repeated later the same month by Prime Minister Sjahrir and senior minister Amir Sjarifuddin in response to criticism of the cabinet for being non-democratic. They were never held, partly because the Indonesian National Revolution was still ongoing and the Republic only controlled Java, Sumatra and a few other areas, and partly because the socialist government was extremely unpopular due to its policy of negotiating with the Dutch colonial power, and would be expected to do very badly in any election. However, there were regional elections in Bali, Solo and Kediri.

=== Early elections (1955) ===
Indonesia's first general election elected members of the DPR and the Constitutional Assembly of Indonesia (Konstituante). The election was organised by the government of Prime Minister Ali Sastroamidjojo. Sastroamidjojo himself declined to stand for election, and Burhanuddin Harahap became prime minister.

The election occurred in two stages:

- The election of the members of the DPR, which took place on 29 September 1955. Twenty-nine political parties and individuals took part;
- The election for the members of the Constitutional Assembly, which took place on 15 December 1955.

The five largest parties in the election were the National Party of Indonesia (PNI), Council of Indonesian Muslim Associations Party (Masyumi), Nahdlatul Ulama (NU), Communist Party of Indonesia (PKI), and Indonesian Islamic Union Party (PSII).

=== Under the New Order (1971–1997) ===
Most elections during the New Order were conducted by General Elections Institution (LPU), as of 1997 election, it was led by Minister of Home Affairs.

==== First election (1971) ====
The first election after the establishment of Suharto's New Order took place on 5 July 1971. Ten political parties participated.

The five largest political parties were a newly-participate "functional group" Golkar, Nahdlatul Ulama, Muslim Party of Indonesia (Parmusi), PNI and PSII.

==== Further elections (1977–1997) ====
A map showing the parties/organisations with the largest vote share per province in Indonesia's elections from 1977 to 2019

Five further legislative elections were held under Suharto administration. In accordance with the legislation, these were contested by two parties: United Development Party (PPP) and Indonesian Democratic Party (PDI); as well as Golkar. All elections in this period were won by Golkar.

On every March after the legislative election, the MPR would hold General Sessions (Sidang Umum MPR) in which included the election of president and soon after, the vice president; as mandated by the original constitution. On all occasions, Suharto was the only person ever stood as a presidential candidate, thus enabling him to be elected unanimously. On vice-presidential elections, all candidates endorsed by Golkar (and the military faction) went on to be elected unanimously.

To ensure that Golkar always won more than 60% of the popular vote, the New Order regime used a number of tactics. These included:

- Reducing the number of opponents: In 1973, the existing political parties were forced to merge into either PPP or PDI. These were the only parties allowed to contest general elections.
- Weakening the remaining opponents: The two political parties were forbidden to criticise government policy, and the government had to approve all slogans they used. Furthermore, they were not allowed to organise at the village level (where the majority of Indonesians live). To stop the rise of charismatic figures, their candidates had to be vetted by the government. When a potentially charismatic figure (in the form of founding president Sukarno's daughter Megawati Sukarnoputri) became a leader of the PDI, the government engineered a political convention in Medan in 1996 to remove her. Ironically, the ensuing disturbances at the PDI's Jakarta headquarters began a chain of events that indirectly led to the downfall of the New Order.
- Coercion to vote Golkar: Civil servants and state- and regional-owned enterprises employees were compulsorily members of the Golkar-linked Employees' Corps of the Republic of Indonesia (KORPRI) and hence ordered to support Golkar, or face accusations of insubordination and even forced relocation to a remote region. Private sector workers were reminded of the need for "stability". Many people believed the vote was not secret, and the government did little to persuade them otherwise. Many voters were still at school, and they were warned by teachers of a link between their choice at the ballot box and exam success.
- The vote-counting process: The Golkar votes were counted first, then those of the two other parties. In the 1997 election, by 9 p.m. on the day after voting, Golkar had already been awarded 94% of its eventual vote. By contrast, the PPP had been credited with less than 10% of its final tally.
- Vote-rigging: Although the counting at the local ballot boxes was conducted in public, with the ballot papers held up and the scores marked on boards, it was at the later stages where irregularities were frequently reported.
- Multiple voting: There was no effective way of determining who had already voted, allowing many to do so more than once.

Summary of 1977–1997 election results
Year	United Development Party (Partai Persatuan Pembangunan, PPP)		The Functional Groups (Golongan Karya, Golkar)		Indonesian Democratic Party (Partai Demokrasi Indonesia, PDI)	
Year	Votes	Seats	Votes	Seats	Votes	Seats
1977	18,743,491 (29.29%)	99 (27.50%)	39,750,096 (62.11%)	232 (64.44%)	5,504,757 (8.60%)	29 (8.06%)
1982	20,871,880 (27.78%)	94 (26.11%)	48,334,724 (64.34%)	242 (67.22%)	5,919,702 (7.88%)	24 (6.67%)
1987	13,701,428 (15.97%)	61 (15.25%)	62,783,680 (73.17%)	299 (74.75%)	9,324,708 (10.87%)	40 (10.00%)
1992	16,624,647 (17.00%)	62 (15.50%)	66,599,331 (68.10%)	282 (70.50%)	14,565,556 (14.89%)	56 (14.00%)
1997	25,341,028 (22.43%)	89 (20.94%)	84,187,907 (74.51%)	325 (76.47%)	3,463,226 (3.07%)	11 (2.59%)
Source: General Election Commission; Seats up for election: 360 (1977 and 1982), 400 (1987 and 1992), 425 (1997)

=== Reform era (1999–present) ===
The 1999 election was the first election held after the collapse of the New Order. It was held on 7 June 1999 under the government of B.J. Habibie. Forty-eight political parties participated.

The six largest parties which passed the electoral threshold of 2% were the Indonesian Democratic Party-Struggle (PDI-P), the reformed Golkar Party, PPP, National Awakening Party (PKB), National Mandate Party (PAN), and Crescent Star Party (PBB).

Under the constitution, the new president was elected by members of the all-house MPR in a joint sitting. This meant that although PDI-P won the largest share of the popular vote, the new president was not its nominee, Megawati Sukarnoputri, but Abdurrahman Wahid of PKB. Megawati then became vice president.

During its 2002 annual session, the MPR added 14 amendments to the 1945 Constitution. Included in these amendments were measures to reorganise the Indonesian legislature. Beginning in 2004, the MPR would be composed of the existing DPR and a new Regional Representative Council (DPD). Because all the seats in the MPR would be directly elected, this called for the removal of the military from the legislature, whose 38 seats for the 1999–2004 period were all appointed. This change and an amendment for direct election of the President and Vice-President were significant steps for Indonesia on the road towards full democracy.

The 2004 legislative election was held on 5 April 2004. A total of 24 parties contested the election. Golkar Party won the largest share of the vote, at 21.6%, followed by PDI-P, PKB, PPP and newly formed Democratic Party. 17 parties won legislative seats.

In 2005, Indonesia also began holding direct elections for governors, mayors and regents. Prior to this, local executives had been elected by a vote of the local legislative body. The first region to do so was Kutai Kartanegara, which held a regency election on 1 June 2005.

==== 2009 elections ====
Legislative elections for the DPD and the DPR were held in Indonesia on 9 April 2009. The presidential election was held on 8 July, with President Susilo Bambang Yudhoyono winning enough of the vote to make the run-off election unnecessary.

==== 2014 elections ====
Legislative elections for the DPD and the DPR were held in Indonesia on 9 April 2014. The presidential election was held on 9 July 2014, with Joko Widodo, then the Governor of Jakarta winning the election against Prabowo Subianto, a former general in Indonesia.

==== 2019 elections ====
In 2019, for the first time, legislative and presidential elections were held on the same day. Joko Widodo, running with Ma’ruf Amin as his vice-presidential candidate, again defeated Prabowo Subianto, running with Sandiaga Uno, winning 55.4% of the vote. In the legislative vote, PDI-P came first, with 19.3% of the vote, followed by Prabowo's Gerindra Party with 12.6% .

==== 2024 elections ====
In 2024, legislative and presidential elections were held on the same day. Prabowo Subianto, with Gibran Rakabuming Raka as his vice-president, defeated both Anies Baswedan, running with Muhaimin Iskandar (24.94%), and also Ganjar Pranowo, running with Mahfud MD (16,4%), winning 58.5% of the vote. On March 20, the KPU certified the results and declared him as the president-elect of Indonesia. Constitutional Court confirmed his status on 22 April 2024. The replacement of the president will be held on 20 October 2024. As for the legislative elections, PDI-P came first, winning 16.7% of the vote, followed by the Golkar Party with 15.2%.

== Historical results ==
=== 1955 legislative election ===
Party	Votes	%	Seats
Indonesian National Party	8,434,653	22.32	57
Masyumi Party	7,903,886	20.92	57
Nahdlatul Ulama	6,955,141	18.41	45
Communist Party of Indonesia	6,176,914	16.35	39
Indonesian Islamic Union Party	1,091,160	2.89	8
Indonesian Christian Party	1,003,325	2.66	8
Catholic Party (Indonesia)	770,740	2.04	6
Socialist Party of Indonesia	753,191	1.99	5
League of Supporters of Indonesian Independence	541,306	1.43	4
Islamic Education Movement	483,014	1.28	4
National People's Party (Indonesia)	242,125	0.64	2
Labour Party (Indonesia, 1949)	224,167	0.59	2
Movement to Defend the Pancasila	219,985	0.58	2
Indonesia People's Party	206,261	0.55	2
Police Employee's Association of the Republic of Indonesia	200,419	0.53	2
Murba Party	199,588	0.53	2
Consultative Council for Indonesian Citizenship	178,887	0.47	1
Great Indonesia Unity Party–Wongsonegoro	178,481	0.47	1
Indonesian Movement	154,792	0.41	1
Indonesian Marhaen People's Union	149,287	0.40	1
Dayak Unity Party	146,054	0.39	1
Great Indonesia Unity Party–Hazairin	114,644	0.30	1
Islamic Tharikah Unity Party	85,131	0.23	1
Islamic Victory Force	81,454	0.22	1
Village People's Union	77,919	0.21	1
Party of the People of Free Indonesia	72,523	0.19	1
Acoma Party	64,514	0.17	1
Soedjono Prawirosoedarso	53,305	0.14	1
Other parties and independents	1,022,433	2.71	0
Total	37,785,299	100.00	257

=== 1971 legislative election ===
Party	Votes	%	Seats
Golkar	34,348,673	62.80	336
Nahdlatul Ulama	10,213,650	18.67	58
Indonesian National Party	3,793,266	6.93	20
Parmusi	2,930,746	5.36	24
Indonesian Islamic Union Party	1,308,237	2.39	10
Indonesian Christian Party	733,359	1.34	7
Catholic Party (Indonesia)	603,740	1.10	3
Islamic Education Movement	381,309	0.70	2
League of Supporters of Indonesian Independence	338,403	0.62	0
Murba Party	48,126	0.09	0
Total	54,699,509	100.00	460

=== 1997 legislative election ===
Party	Votes	%	Seats
Golkar	84,187,907	74.51	325
United Development Party	25,340,028	22.43	89
Indonesian Democratic Party	3,463,225	3.07	11
Total	112,991,160	100.00	425

== Latest election ==
=== Presidential ===
Candidate	Party	Votes	%
Prabowo Subianto	Gerindra Party	96,214,691	58.59
Anies Baswedan	Independent	40,971,906	24.95
Ganjar Pranowo	Indonesian Democratic Party of Struggle	27,040,878	16.47
Total		164,227,475	100.00
Valid votes		164,227,475	97.51
Invalid/blank votes		4,194,536	2.49
Total votes		168,422,011	100.00
Registered voters/turnout		204,422,181	82.39

=== Legislative ===
==== National ====
Party	Votes	%	+/–	Seats	+/–
Indonesian Democratic Party of Struggle	25,384,673	16.72	–2.61	110	–18
Golkar	23,208,488	15.29	+2.98	102	+17
Gerindra Party	20,071,345	13.22	+0.65	86	+8
National Awakening Party	16,115,358	10.62	+0.93	68	+10
NasDem Party	14,660,328	9.66	+0.61	69	+10
Prosperous Justice Party	12,781,241	8.42	+0.21	53	+3
Democratic Party	11,283,053	7.43	–0.34	44	–10
National Mandate Party	10,984,639	7.24	+0.40	48	+4
United Development Party	5,878,708	3.87	–0.65	0	–19
Indonesian Solidarity Party	4,260,108	2.81	+0.92	0	0
Perindo Party	1,955,131	1.29	–1.38	0	0
Gelora Party	1,282,000	0.84	New	0	New
People's Conscience Party	1,094,599	0.72	–0.82	0	0
Labour Party	972,898	0.64	New	0	New
Ummah Party	642,550	0.42	New	0	New
Crescent Star Party	484,487	0.32	–0.47	0	0
Garuda Party	406,884	0.27	–0.23	0	0
Nusantara Awakening Party	326,803	0.22	New	0	New
Total	151,793,293	100.00	–	580	+5
Valid votes	151,793,293	90.52			
Invalid/blank votes	15,891,240	9.48			
Total votes	167,684,533	100.00			
Registered voters/turnout	204,422,181	82.03			

==== Regional ====
Party	DPRD I (Provinces)		DPRD II (Regencies and cities)	
Party	Seats	Speakers	Seats	Speakers
Indonesian Democratic Party of Struggle	389	12	2810	153
Golkar	365	14	2521	122
Gerindra Party	323	4	2120	43
NasDem Party	265	3	1849	54
National Awakening Party	220	1	1833	39
Prosperous Justice Party	210	2	1312	21
Democratic Party	206	0	1479	18
National Mandate Party	160	1	1236	27
United Development Party	83	0	850	11
People's Conscience Party	42	0	486	4
Indonesian Solidarity Party	33	0	149	2
Perindo Party	31	0	349	4
Crescent Star Party	12	0	164	2
Nusantara Awakening Party	4	0	52	0
Garuda Party	3	0	34	0
Gelora Party	1	0	72	0
Ummah Party	0	0	20	0
Labour Party	0	0	11	0
Aceh Party	20	1	116	7
Aceh Just and Prosperous Party	3	0	16	0
Nanggroe Aceh Party	1	0	21	1
Aceh Abode Party	1	0	7	0
Independent Solidity of the Acehnese Party	0	0	3	0
Total	2372	38	17510	508

== Electoral principles ==
Indonesian election conduct abides by six principles of direct, general, free, confidential, honest, and fair. Those principles are abbreviated and commonly propagated as "Luber-jurdil". The first four principles of "Luber" are adopted by the New Order regime from the 1971 election. After the 1998 reform and the following political liberalisation, two extra principles of "Jurdil" are adopted for the first time in the 1999 election.

- Direct (langsung): Voters shall vote on their own without any intermediary.
- General (umum): All Indonesians that already satisfy voters' criteria, shall be able to vote without any restriction.
- Free (bebas): Voters shall be able to vote by their own conscience without any coercion to vote for a particular candidate.
- Confidential (rahasia): Secret ballot are guaranteed, and voters' choice shall not be known to others but themselves.
- Honest (jujur): Voters, candidates, and electoral institutions shall perform their duty in complete honesty.
- Fair (adil): Voters and candidates shall receive equal treatment by the law, with no particular voters or candidates shall receive preferential or discriminatory treatment.

The voters vote on the election ballot by punching a hole using a provided nail. For legislative ballots, punching can be done in one of the party logo, ballot number, or candidates' name. For presidential, gubernatorial, mayoral, and regent elections, punching can be done in one of the candidates' photograph, ballot number, or name. Ticking method was previously used started in 2009 elections, but it was reverted in 2014 elections.

== Voter registration ==
Voter registration and turnout, 1955–1997
Year	Registered voters	Voter turnout	%
1955	43,104,464	37,875,299	87.86
1971	58,558,776	54,699,509	93.41
1977	70,378,750	63,998,344	90.93
1982	82,134,195	75,126,306	91.47
1987	93,965,953	85,869,816	91.38
1992	107,605,697	97,789,534	90.88
1997	124,740,987	112,991,160	90.58
Source: Ariwibowo et al. 1997, p. 23

Presidential elections voter registration and turnout, 2004-2019
Year	Registered voters	Voter turnout	%
2004, first round	155,048,803	121,293,844	78.23
2004, second round	155,048,803	116,662,700	75.24
2009	176,367,056	127,983,655	72.57
2014	193,944,150	134,953,967	69.58
2019	192,770,611	158,012,506	81.97
2024	204,422,181	168,422,011	82.39

== Criticism ==
Vote buying is common in Indonesia. In Indonesian, vote-buying is often known as politik uang ('money politics'). According to a survey of 440 respondents by Institut Riset Indonesia in January–March 2020 in areas where local elections were to be held in 2020, 60% of respondents said that they would allow their vote to be bought. Reasons for accepting vote buying include considering it as a gift that can not be rejected (35–46%), compensation for not working on the election day (25–30%), and supporting daily needs (9–16%). One of the common tactics of vote-buying is the so-called serangan fajar ('dawn attack'), which involves the giving of money a day or two before the election day. The amount ranges from Rp30,000 to Rp50,000. According to Burhanuddin Muhtadi in his book Kuasa Uang; Politik Uang dalam Pemilu Pasca-Orde Baru (The Power of Money; Money Politics in the Post-New Order Elections), vote-buying in Indonesia is done by individual candidates instead of political parties because of intense intra-party competition. This situation forces candidates to rely on their own networks instead of on the party machine.

In 2020, simultaneous local elections across the country were held in a single day amid the COVID-19 pandemic which stirred some controversy among the Indonesian public. During elections, many people are unable to vote outside their domicile, forcing them to be abstentions (golongan putih, golput).

== See also ==
- Internet censorship in Indonesia
- Politics of Indonesia
- List of political parties in Indonesia
