= Ahmad Soedarsono =

Indonesian aviator and diplomat (1928–1982)

Ambassador of Indonesia to Vietnam
- In office 19 January 1980 – 13 March 1982
- President: Suharto
- Preceded by: Hardi
- Succeeded by: Pudjo Prasetyo

Member of the House of Representatives
- In office 30 January 1964 – 13 February 1968
- Preceded by: Manonga Napitupulu
- Succeeded by: Abdul Basit
- Parliamentary group: Navy representative

Personal details
- Born: 9 May 1928 Surakarta, Dutch East Indies
- Died: 13 March 1982 (aged 53) Singapore
- Resting place: Kalibata Heroes' Cemetery
- Spouse: Karlina Koesoemadinata
- Children: 5, including Bambang Harymurti
- Education: Royal Naval College

Military service
- Allegiance: Indonesia
- Branch/service: Indonesian Navy
- Years of service: 1945–1982
- Rank: First admiral
- Unit: Naval aviation
- Battles/wars: Indonesian National Revolution

Ahmad Soedarsono (9 May 1928 – 13 March 1982) was an Indonesian naval aviator and diplomat who served as Indonesia's ambassador to Vietnam from 1980 until his death in 1982. A graduate of the Royal Naval College and RAF Tern Hill aviation training programme, Ahmad also served as a parliament member from 1964 to 1968 and military attaché to India from 1971 to 1974.

== Military service ==
Ahmad was born on 9 May 1928 in Surakarta. During the Indonesian National Revolution, he joined the student army corps under the command of Major Achmadi Hadisoemarto (later information minister), where he saw service in Surakarta. Despite his armed service, he managed to continued his studies and completed high school in 1948. After the end of the war in 1950, he was sent to the Netherlands to attend the Royal Naval College. Although he was initially slated for naval aviation training, the college's naval aviation department suddenly closed and Ahmad continued his training as a seamen instead.

After finishing his education at the naval college in 1953, Ahmad undertook navigator training in Valkenburg for a year. He then returned to naval service, where he was posted as a navigator officer aboard KRI Banteng. Afterwards, he served at the navy's planning bureau and air corps bureau before undertaking pilot training program at RAF Tern Hill airbase from 1957 to 1959. Sometime during his naval service, Ahmad attended an intelligence course at the Indonesian Army Command and General Staff College in Bandung.

== Political and diplomatic career ==
On 30 January 1964, Ahmad, who held the rank of lieutenant colonel, was sworn in as a representative of the Navy to the House of Representatives. He replaced commodore Manonga Napitupulu who was commissioned as the deputy chief of staff of the Sumatra regional command. He retained his position following national leadership changes that ousted president Sukarno. He was discharged from his position after being replaced by naval colonel Abdul Basit on 13 February 1968.

Three years after his parliamentary tenure, from 1971 to 1974, he served as a military attaché at the embassy in New Delhi, India. By 1977, he joined the foreign ministry as the Asia Pacific director, where he played a key role in inter-ASEAN negotiations and bilateral relations with Asia-Pacific nations. He was actively involved behind the scenes in Suharto's attempt to pacify hostilities between Pakistan and Bangladesh and in resolving border issues between Indonesia and Papua New Guinea. Protocol director general Joop Ave described him as a "hardworking man who is well liked among his colleagues in the foreign ministry".

From the foreign ministry, Ahmad was promoted to become Indonesia's ambassador to Vietnam, and was sworn in on 19 January 1980. On one occasion, while playing tennis with his military attaché Soegito, Ahmad complained about his backache. After several medical check-ups in Hanoi and Bangkok, it was revealed that Ahmad had a late stage cancer. Foreign minister Mochtar Kusumaatmadja, who permitted him to seek medication in the Netherlands, requested him to resign due to his health issues, but Ahmad refused and stated that he wished to "die on duty". Ahmad's health gradually declined en route to Hanoi after attending conference of ambassadors stationed in Asian countries in February 1982, and he died on the 13th of March that year while undergoing treatment in Singapore. He was buried at the Kalibata Heroes' Cemetery the day after his death in a ceremony led by justice minister Ali Said. At the time of his death, he held the rank of first admiral.

== Awards ==
Throughout his military and civilian service, Ahmad received a number of medals from the Indonesian government:

- Bintang Gerilya
- Bintang Sewindu Angkatan Perang
- Bintang Jalasena Nararya
- Six other satyalancanas

== Personal life ==
Ahmad was married to Karlina Koesoemadinata, the daughter of Sundanese musicologist Raden Machjar Angga Koesoemadinata. The couple had five children, including Bambang Harymurti, who would later became a journalist and the editor-in-chief of Tempo.
