= Garuda Contingent =

- Kontingen Garuda
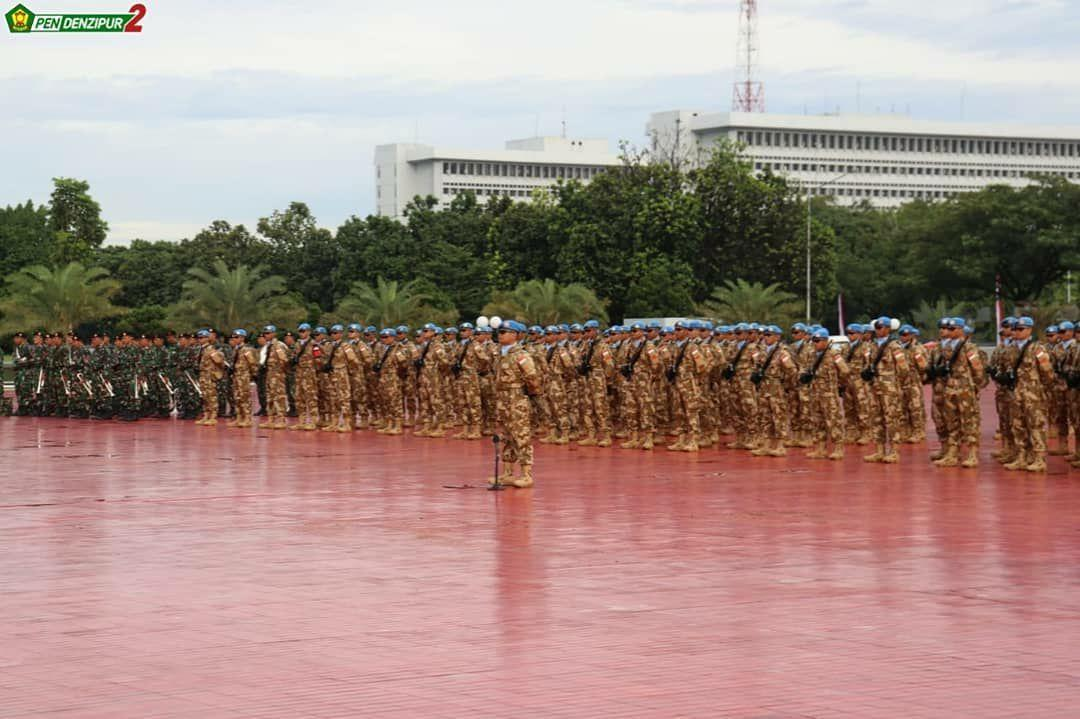
- Indonesian peacekeeping Garuda XX contingent during a pre-deployment departure ceremony in 2003
- Active: 27 November 1956 – present
- Country: Indonesia
- Allegiance: United Nations
- Branch: Indonesian National Armed Forces; Indonesian National Police
- Type: Deployment
- Role: Peacekeeping
- Size: Up to battalion
- Nickname: KONGA
- Engagements: Various peacekeeping missions for the United Nations

The Garuda Contingent (Indonesian: Kontingen Garuda, abbreviated KONGA) is a peacekeeping unit drawn from the Indonesian National Armed Forces and the Indonesian National Police that serve with the United Nations (UN). Since its first mission starting on 27 November 1956; 69 years ago, KONGA has deployed to three continents.

== History and operations ==
The Garuda Contingent was first deployed (KONGA I) to Egypt and Israel on 27 November 1956, as part of the United Nations Emergency Force (UNEF) to secure and monitor a ceasefire in Egypt, remaining until September 1957. It was initially under the command of Lieutenant Colonel Hartoyo, who was subsequently replaced by Lieutenant Colonel Suhadi Suromihardjo.

The next two contingents were sent to the Republic of the Congo. The first contingent (KONGA II) consisted of a battalion (Batalyon Angkatan Darat Republik Indonesia) of 1,074 troops, and was led by Colonel Prijatna (later replaced by Lieutenant Colonel Solichin); this contingent served from September 1960 to May 1961. The second contingent (KONGA III) returning to Congo consisted of 3,457 troops selected from a number of units of the Indonesian Army; namely the Battalion 531 (Raiders), Kodam II (Bukit Barisan), the 7th Cavalry Battalion, with support from combat assistance elements. KONGA III was led by Brigadier General Kemal Idris (later replaced by Colonel Sabirin Mochtar); this contingent served from 1962 to the end of 1963, and saw one casualty; Colonel GA. Manulang, commander 7th Cavalry Battalion lost his life. Notably, KONGA III also included a journalist, H.A. Manan Karim, from Medan.

The Indonesian government awarded Vespa VGLA and VGLB models, collectively known as the Vespa Kongo, to soldiers of KONGA II and KONGA III in recognition of their service. They were assembled in Germany by Vespa GmbH in Augsburg and were later made available for sale to the general public due to high demand. The scooter is also known as the Vespa Ndog, due to the rounded, egg-like shape of its left and right sides, and features the Garuda bird emblem on the front left side of its body.

The Garuda Contingent's fourth (KONGA IV) and fifth (KONGA V) deployments were to Vietnam in 1973 and 1974, towards the end of the Vietnam War. This was followed by a sixth (KONGA VI) deployment to Egypt after the Yom Kippur War under the command of Colonel Rudini. The Garuda Contingent later returned to Vietnam and Egypt for a seventh and eighth deployment, respectively.

After an eight-year hiatus, the Garuda Contingent deployed as part of the United Nations Iran–Iraq Military Observer Group under the command of Lieutenant Colonel Endriartono Sutarto, then Lieutenant Colonel Fachrul Razi and Johny Lumintang.

In 1992, five Garuda Contingent members participated in the United Nations Operation in Somalia I under the command of Lieutenant Colonel Bibit Santoso. This was later reduced to four soldiers, under the command of Major CZI Budiman.

During the Bosnian War, the Garuda Contingent XIV deployed medical officers and military observers in their fifteenth mission. This was not well received by the Indonesian populace, who wished that the soldiers took a more active, military role. This was followed by a deployment to Georgia and a 15-man deployment to Mozambique in 1994. That same year, they were also deployed to the Philippines under the command of Brigadier General Asmardi Arbi (later replaced by Brigadier General Kivlan Zein) to help deal with the conflict between the Moro National Liberation Front and the Philippine government.

In November 1997, Garuda Contingent XVIII consisted of eight TNI officers deployed to Tajikistan, under the command of Major Can Suyatno.

Less than two years later, Garuda Contingent XIX deployed to Sierra Leone in 1999, remaining until 2002. XIX-1 comprised ten TNI officers led by Lt Col K. Dwi Pujianto. KONGA XIX-2 also included ten officers, led by Lt Col PSK Amarullah. KONGA XIX-3's ten officers were led by Lt Col (P) Dwi Wahyu Aguk. The final element in Sierra Leone, KONGA XIX-4, also included ten officers, led by Major CZI Benny Oktaviar MDA, who was mission tasked as an observer.

In 2003, the Garuda Contingent XX-A deployed on its twentieth mission, to the Democratic Republic of the Congo in central Africa. A total of 171 troops deployed originally, including 32 medical staff and 28 marines. They were deployed with peacekeepers from Nepal, India, and Bangladesh, with the peacekeeping mission being led by France. As of 2009, the focus had shifted to infrastructure, and a seventh contingent had been deployed.

The Garuda Contingent was part of the United Nations Interim Force in Lebanon. In August 2010, two of its soldiers were criticised after they escaped from clashes between Israel and Lebanon by fleeing in a taxi. In June 2020, an Indonesian soldier was killed and another was injured during an attack on MONUSCO, near Beni, North Kivu.

== Deployments ==
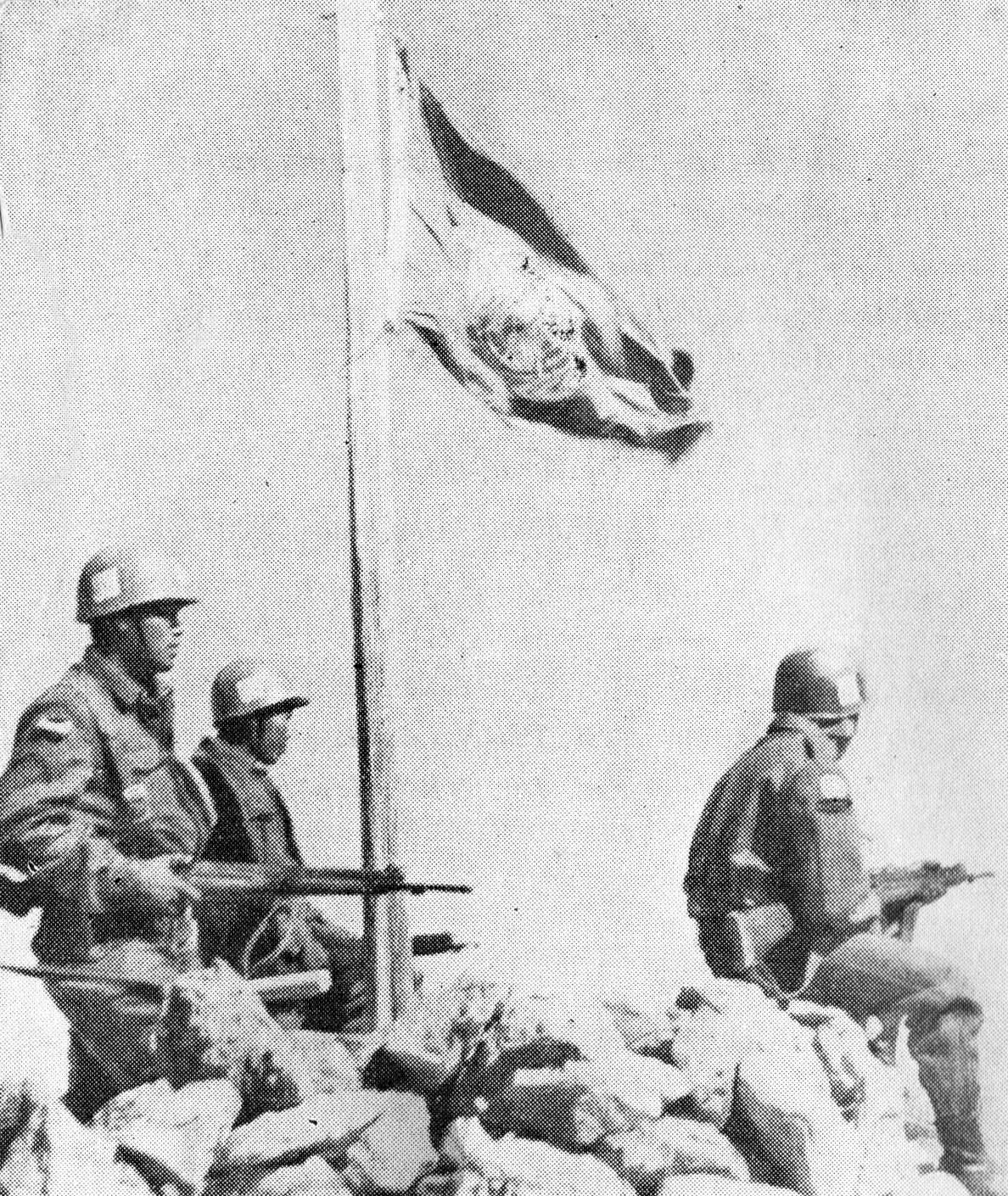
Indonesian peacekeepers of Garuda Contingent I under the UN Flag, circa 1957
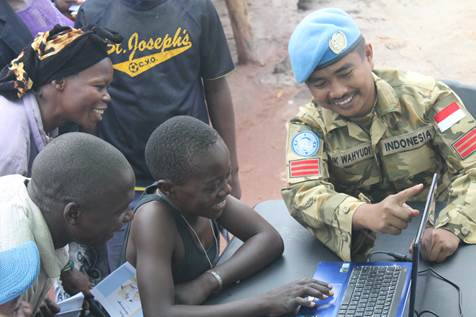
An Indonesian peacekeeper teaching the local population in Dungu, the Democratic Republic of the Congo
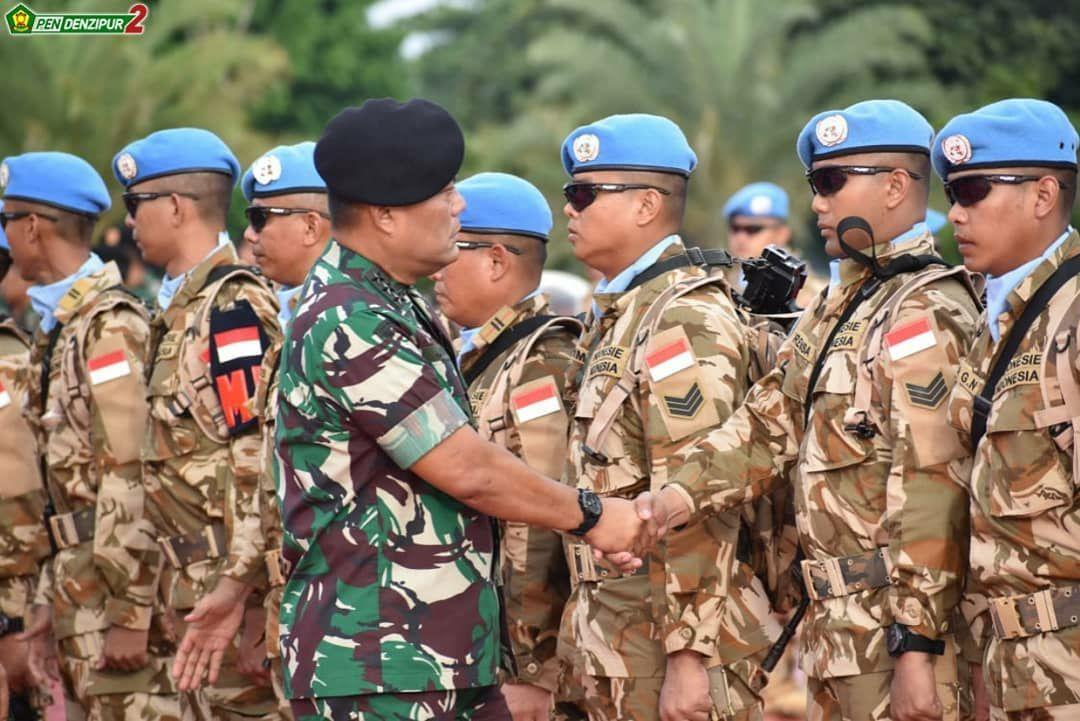
Personnel of the Garuda contingent wear an Indonesian variant of desert Disruptive Pattern Material

location(s)	operation	TNI KONGA deployment	period
Egypt, Israel	UNEF	Garuda Contingent I	November 1956 – September 1957
Republic of the Congo	ONUC	Garuda Contingent II	September 1960 – May 1961
Republic of the Congo	ONUC	Garuda Contingent III	1962 – 1963
Vietnam	ICCS	Garuda Contingent IV	January – August 1973
Vietnam	ICCS	Garuda Contingent V	August 1973 – April 1974
Egypt	UNEF	Garuda Contingent VI	December 1973 – October 1974
Vietnam	ICCS	Garuda Contingent VII (A & B)	April 1974 – June 1975
Egypt	UNEF II	Garuda Contingent VIII (1–9)	September 1974 – October 1979
Iraq, Kuwait	UNIIMOG	Garuda Contingent IX	August 1988 – November 1990
Namibia	UNTAG	Garuda Contingent X	June 1989 – March 1990
Kuwait	UNIKOM	Garuda Contingent XI (1–5)	1992 – 1995
Cambodia	UNTAC	Garuda Contingent XII (A–D)	July 1992 – April 1993
Somalia	UNOSOM I	Garuda Contingent XIII	July 1992 – April 1993
Bosnia and Herzegovina	UNPROFOR	Garuda Contingent XIV	November 1993 – 1997
Georgia	UNOMIG	Garuda Contingent XV	October 1995 – November 1995
Mozambique	UNOMOZ	Garuda Contingent XVI	June 1994 – December 1994
Philippines	Philippines - MNLF ceasefire monitors	Garuda Contingent XVII	October 1994 – November 1994
Tajikistan	UNMOT	Garuda Contingent XVIII	November 1997
Sierra Leone	UNAMSIL	Garuda Contingent XIX (1–4)	1999 – 2001
Democratic Republic of the Congo	MONUSCO	Garuda Contingent XX-A	2003
Liberia	UNIMIL	Garuda Contingent XXI	2003
Sudan	UNMIS	Garuda Contingent XXII	2008 – 2009
Lebanon	UNIFIL	Garuda Contingent XXIII	2007 – 2011
Nepal	UNMIN	Garuda Contingent XXIV	2007 – 2011
Lebanon	UNIFIL	Garuda Contingent XXV	2008 – 2017
Lebanon	UNIFIL	Garuda Contingent XXVI	2008 – 2012
Sudan	UNAMID	Garuda Contingent XXVII	2008 – 2012
Lebanon	UNIFIL	Garuda Contingent XXVIII	2009 – 2019
Lebanon	UNIFIL	Garuda Contingent XXIX	2009 – 2018
Lebanon	UNIFIL	Garuda Contingent XXX	2011 – 2018
Lebanon	UNIFIL	Garuda Contingent XXXI	2011 – 2018

== Units involved ==
Indonesian National Armed Forces

- Koopssus
- BAIS
- Indonesian Army
  - Kostrad
  - Kopassus
  - Tontaipur
- Indonesian Navy
  - Indonesian Marine Corps
  - Indonesian Fleet Command
- Indonesian Air Force
  - Kopasgat
- Indonesian National Police
  - Mobile Brigade Corps
  - Detachment 88

Indonesian State Intelligence Agency
