= Bambang Harymurti =

Indonesian journalist (born 1956)

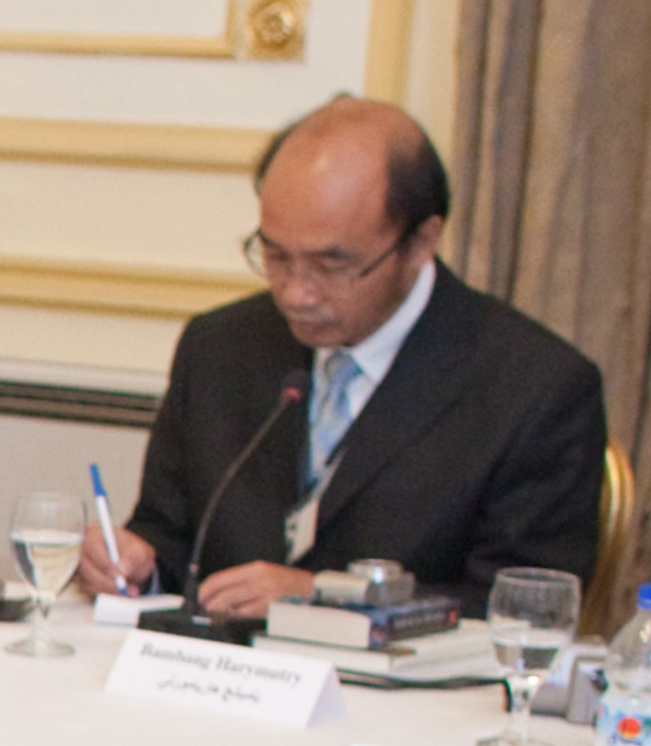
- Harymurti in 2009
- Born: 10 December 1956 (age 69); Jakarta
- Education: Bandung Institute of Technology
- Occupation: Journalist
- Spouse: Marga Alisjahbana

Bambang Harymurti ([ˈbambaŋ hariˈmʊrti]; born 10 December 1956), commonly referred to by his initials BHM, is an Indonesian journalist and editor-in-chief of Tempo. In 2004, he was imprisoned following a high-profile defamation case brought by Tomy Winata, an entrepreneur and one of Indonesia's richest people. He is currently serving as deputy chair of Indonesia's Press Council.

== Biography ==
Harymurti was born on 10 December 1956, to air force pilot Ahmad Soedarsono and Karlina Koesoemadinata. As a child, he dreamed of becoming an astronaut.

=== Early career ===
Harymurti holds received BS in electrical engineering from Bandung Institute of Technology in 1984 and an MPA from the John F. Kennedy School of Government at Harvard University. Although he hoped to apply for Indonesia's space program, he took a job with Tempo in 1982 to help support his family after his father's death. He has worked for Tempo, Time, and Media Indonesia. His journalism has won awards including the 1997 "Excellence in Journalism" award from the Indonesian Observer Daily and the 2006 PWI Jawa Timur Pena Award. He served as the head of Tempo's offices in Washington, D.C from 1991 to 1994.

While on assignment with Tempo to cover Indonesia's space program, Harymurti qualified as a potential astronaut.

On 9 June 1997, Harymurti was suspended from his job as executive editor of Media Indonesia for two weeks. Harymurti stated that the suspension was for "not following orders" and forgetting to inform the head editor of Media Indonesia's Sunday Edition that the cover story should have been changed to an article about then-President Suharto's birthday. However, it was suspected that his suspension was due to Media Indonesia's anti-Suharto stance during the 1997 elections.

Harymurti became chief editor of Tempo in 1999, replacing co-founder Goenawan Mohamad.

=== Winata trial ===
One of Harymutri's reporters, International Press Freedom Award winner Ahmad Taufik, published an article on 3 March 2003 implicating Winata in the burning of the Tanah Abang textile market in Jakarta, a fire from which Winata allegedly stood to profit. According to Taufik, he discovered following the fire that Winata had submitted plans for renovating the market only a few months before.

On 7 March, the magazine was threatened with libel charges by Winata's lawyers; the following day, a group of over 200 protesters appeared at the Tempo offices and allegedly threatened to burn the office down, gouge Taufik's eyes out, shouted racial insults, and assaulted Taufik when he went outside to speak with them. According to witnesses, when Harymurti went to the police station with reporter Karaniya Dharmasaputra to file a complaint, they were also beaten by protesters, this time within sight of police officers who did not intervene.

Winata later filed a lawsuit, naming Taufik, his editor Iskandar Ali, and Harymurti as defendants. The suit charged the three with libel, defamation, and refusing "to respect religious and moral norms". BBC News described the case as being "widely criticised as an attack on Indonesia's press". Harymurti called the charges "the biggest and worst scandal in [Indonesia's] legal system." Harymutri's trial was also protested by international press freedom organisations such as ARTICLE 19, Freedom House, Index on Censorship, the World Press Freedom Committee, the World Association of Newspapers, Reporters Without Borders, Canadian Journalists for Free Expression, and The Committee to Protect Journalists. Amnesty International issued an appeal on behalf of the reporters, naming them potential prisoners of conscience. In a letter to President Susilo Bambang Yudhoyono, Human Rights Watch also criticised Indonesia's "more restrictive environment" for journalists, which it said Harymurti had come to symbolise. US Deputy Secretary of Defense Paul Wolfowitz criticised the arrest in a New York Times editorial, stating that the trial had "implications far beyond the courtroom in Jakarta", describing it as a test for Indonesian democracy.

On 16 September 2004, Harymurti was found guilty of "defamation and false reporting" and sentenced to a year in prison, while Taufik and Ali were exonerated. The Central Jakarta Court's ruling that Tempo had to pay USD 55,000 in damages was later overturned. Harymutri's sentence was also overturned unanimously by the Supreme Court of Indonesia on 9 February 2005, National Press Day in Indonesia. A court spokesperson stated, "We want to ensure that journalists are protected", and affirmed the National Press Law was lex specialis, above the criminal code (KUHP). Harymurti welcomed the decision as "not a personal victory but a victory for all Indonesian journalists".

Harymurti is currently serving as the deputy chair of Indonesia's Press Council.

== Personal life ==
Harymurti married his long-time friend Marga Alisjahbana in 1984. Together they have two children.

== Notes ==
1. Original: ... "tuntutan ini adalah skandal paling buruk dan besar dalam dunia peradilan [Indonesia].
