= 1987 Indonesian legislative election =

- 23 April 1987

400 of the 500 seats in the House of Representatives 201 seats needed for a majority
- Registered: 93,965,953
- Turnout: 91.38% (▼0.09pp)
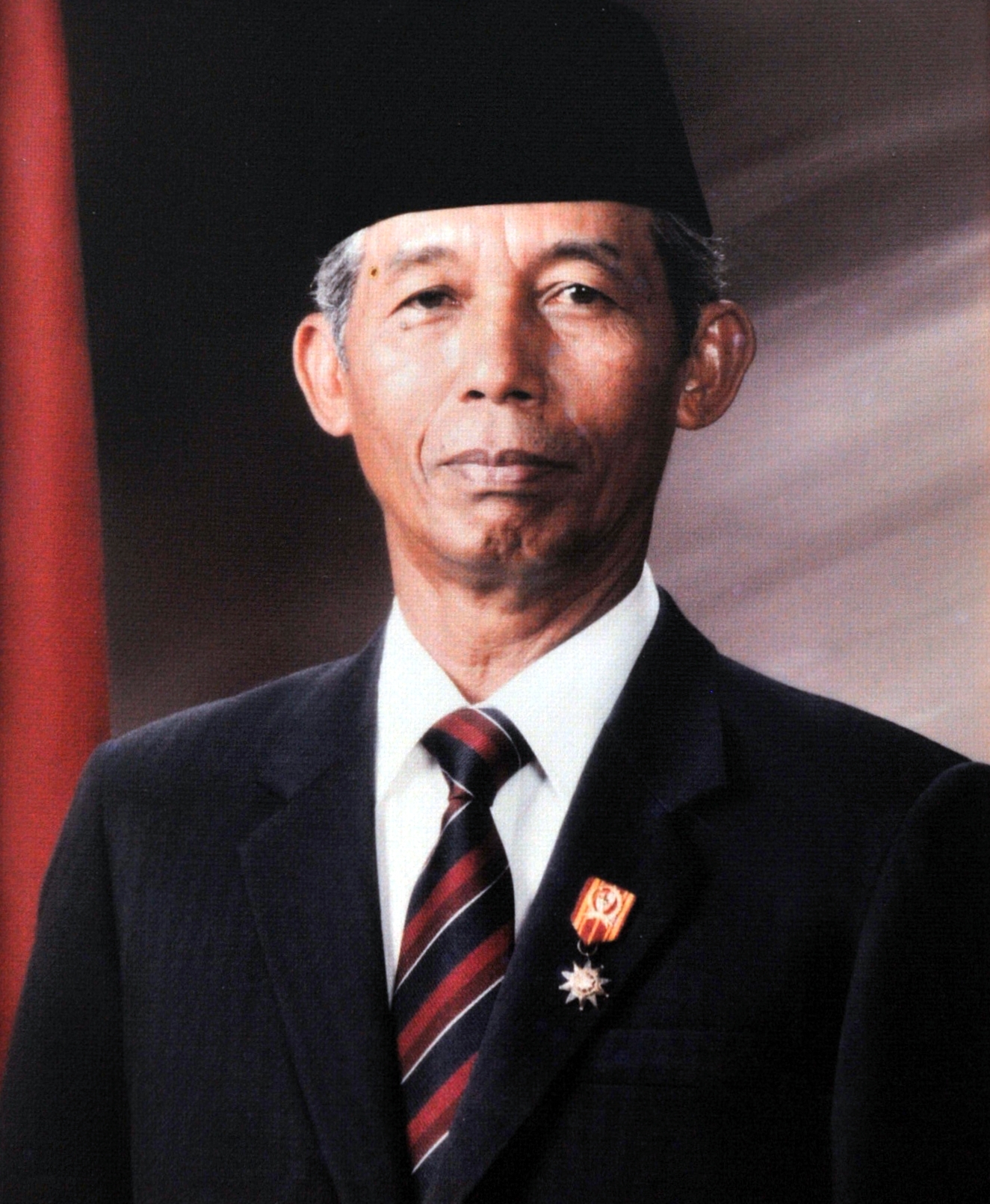

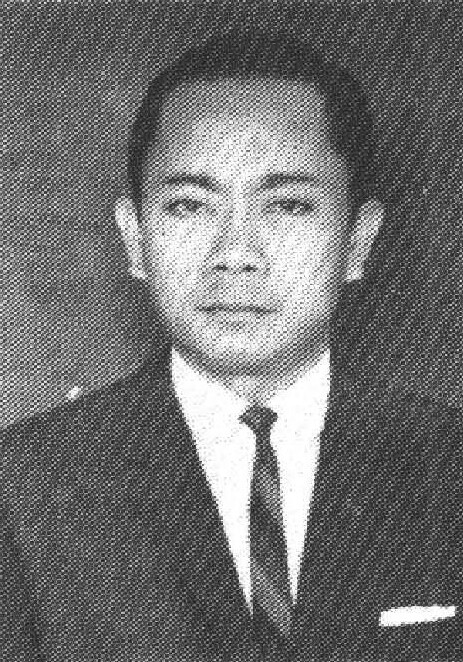

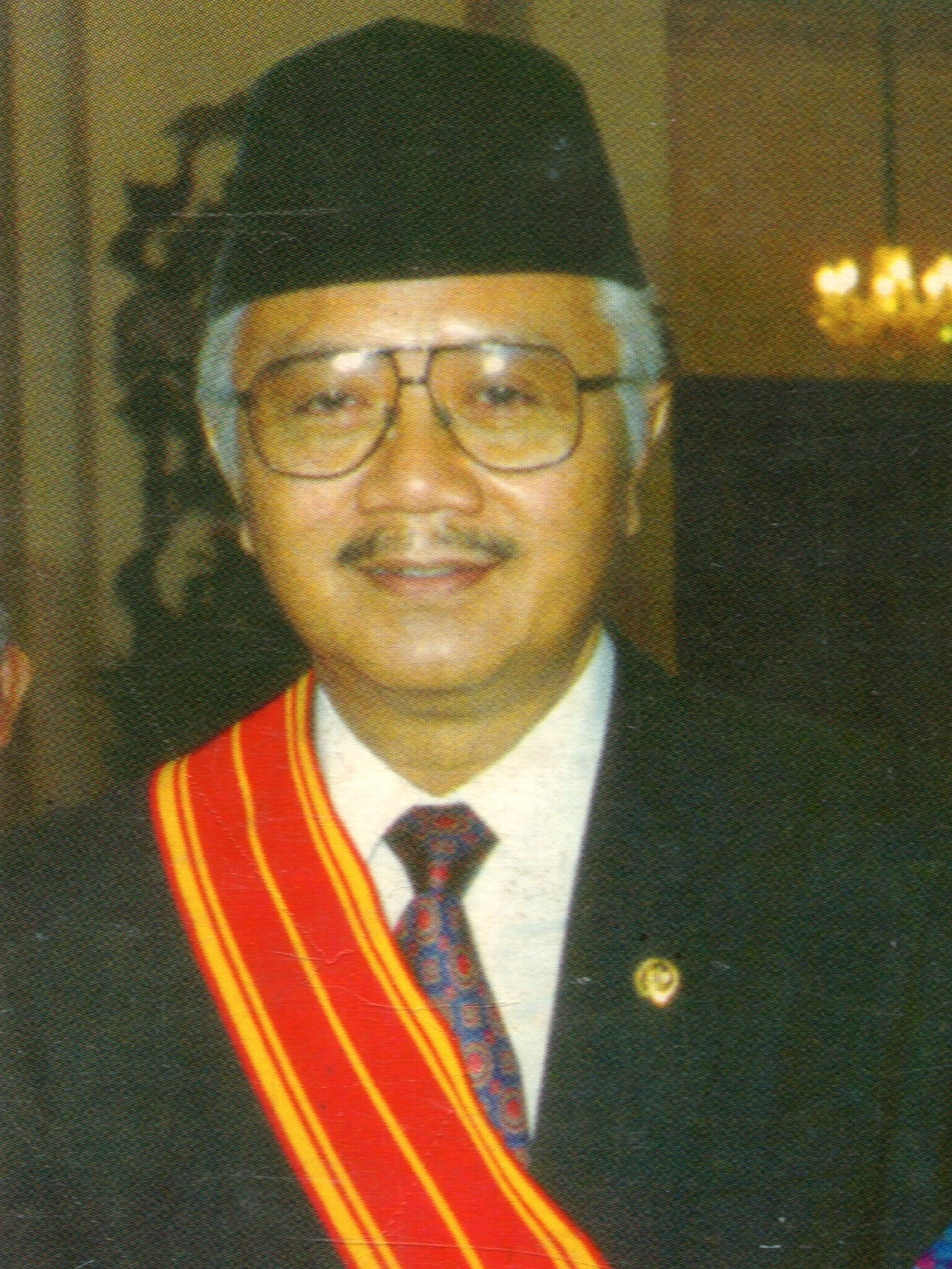
	First party	Second party	Third party
Leader	Sudharmono	Jailani Naro	Suryadi
Party	Golkar	PPP	PDI
Last election	64.34%, 242 seats	27.78%, 94 seats	7.88%, 24 seats
Seats won	299	61	40
Seat change	▲57	▼33	▲16
Popular vote	62,783,680	13,701,428	9,384,708
Percentage	73.11%	15.96%	10.93%
Swing	▲8.77pp	▼11.82pp	▲3.05pp
- Golkar PPP
Speaker before election
Amir Machmud
Golkar
Elected Speaker
Kharis Suhud
Golkar

Legislative elections were held in Indonesia on 23 April 1987, to elect 400 of the 500 members of the People's Representative Council (DPR), the national legislature. (Note: The remaining 100 seats consisted of unelected members of the Indonesian National Armed Forces (ABRI), who were directly appointed by the government.) The election was the fifth legislative election in the country since independence and the fourth legislative election under President Suharto's New Order. The election resulted in an outright majority for Golkar, which retained its status as the ruling party of the country.

According to the General Elections Institution, the election campaign began on 24 March and ended on 18 April, with a four-day election silence up until election day on 22 April. In addition, the New Order regime also implemented a number of regulations which benefited Golkar. These include a ban on the formation of party branches below the provincial level, a reduction in the campaign period (from 45 to 25 days), and a ban on criticism of government policies.

Golkar, like in all other elections during the New Order, won an outright majority of the vote, defeating both opposition parties, and retaining its status as the ruling political party. It increased its share of votes from 64.34% to 73.11%, and its share of seats increasing from 242 seats to 299 seats. The result for the opposition was mixed. While the United Development Party (PPP) saw both its share of votes and share of seats decline, from 27.78% to just 15.96% and from 94 to 61 seats; The Indonesian Democratic Party (PDI) had their best showing up until that point, as it increased its performance by 16 seats, and 3.05% of the popular vote.

== Background ==
In the elections of 1977 and 1982, the notionally Islamic United Development Party (PPP) had seen a steady increase in its share of the vote, despite the New Order government's restrictions on political activity. It managed to position itself as the party of the "little people." In 1984, with the agreement of the government, under the leadership of Abdurrahman Wahid, the Nahdlatul Ulama (NU) left the PPP, which it had been forced to join under the 1973 fusion of the Islamic parties.

Later that year, the government obliged all political parties to adopt the state philosophy Pancasila as their ideological basis. In 1985 the PPP was pressured to change the party symbol from the Kaaba, the building at the center of the al-Masjid al-Haram in Mecca, Saudi Arabia, to the star from the official symbol for Pancasila.

In 1987, the NU leadership declared that its members and supporters were "not obliged to vote for the PPP, and not forbidden to vote for Golkar". This had the effect of increasing the influence of the NU, which had been much diminished within the PPP.

== Timeline of events ==
Events	Date
Voter registration	1 May 1986 - 26 August 1986
Submission of names and symbols of the political parties	1 May 1986 - 29 June 1986
Nomination of MP candidates	10 July 1986 - 10 August 1987
Electoral campaign	24 March 1987 - 17 April 1987
Election silence	18 April 1987 - 22 April 1987
Election day	23 April 1987
Vote Calculation	DPRD II (24 April 1987 - 18 May 1987); DPRD I (24 April 1987 - 25 May 1987); DPR (24 April 1987 - 31 May 1987)
Ratification of election results	DPRD II (18 May 1987 - 24 May 1987); DPRD I (25 May 1987 - 31 May 1987); DPR (1 June 1987 - 10 June 1987)
Appointment of legislative members	DPRD II (25 May 1987 - 10 June 1987); DPRD I (1 June 1987 - 20 June 1987); DPR (11 June 1987 - 10 July 1987)

== Campaign ==
=== Golkar ===
The priority of Golkar was to secure a majority of the popular vote in the devoutly Islamic province of Aceh, the only province apart from Jakarta where it had failed to do so in 1982. In order to achieve this, Golkar made use of two civil servants to run its financial campaign: the managing director of state-owned oil company Pertamina and the head of the state-owned logistics agency BULOG. Local companies, much more heavily dependent on government contracts then in the past, were the biggest donors. However, the crucial factor for Golkar was the political leadership of Aceh governor Ibrahim Hasan, an economist who managed to unite the traditional and modern aspirations of the Acehnese people. He traveled around the province telling people that a Golkar victory would bring about material development without sacrificing traditional values.

=== PDI ===
In the final days of the campaign, thousands of young supporters of the Indonesian Democratic Party (PDI) paraded in Jakarta carrying portraits of former president Sukarno. In their eyes, the anti-Western Sukarno was associated with the Indonesian National Party (PNI), one of the parties forced to fuse into the PDI in 1973, and was therefore a clear symbol of opposition to the pro-Western New Order. During the campaign, the PDI had tried to take a stand against corruption and economic inequality.

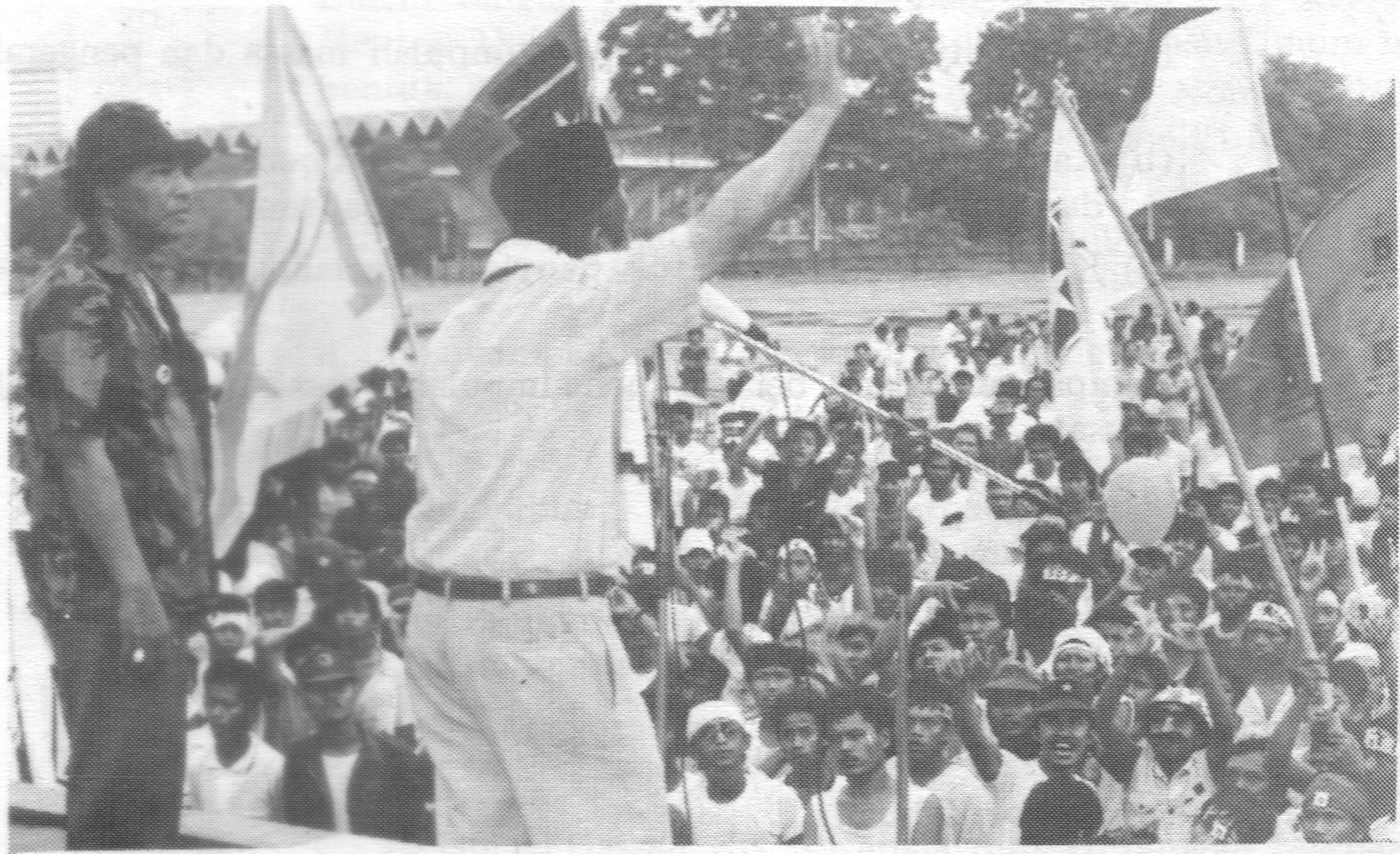
PPP campaign

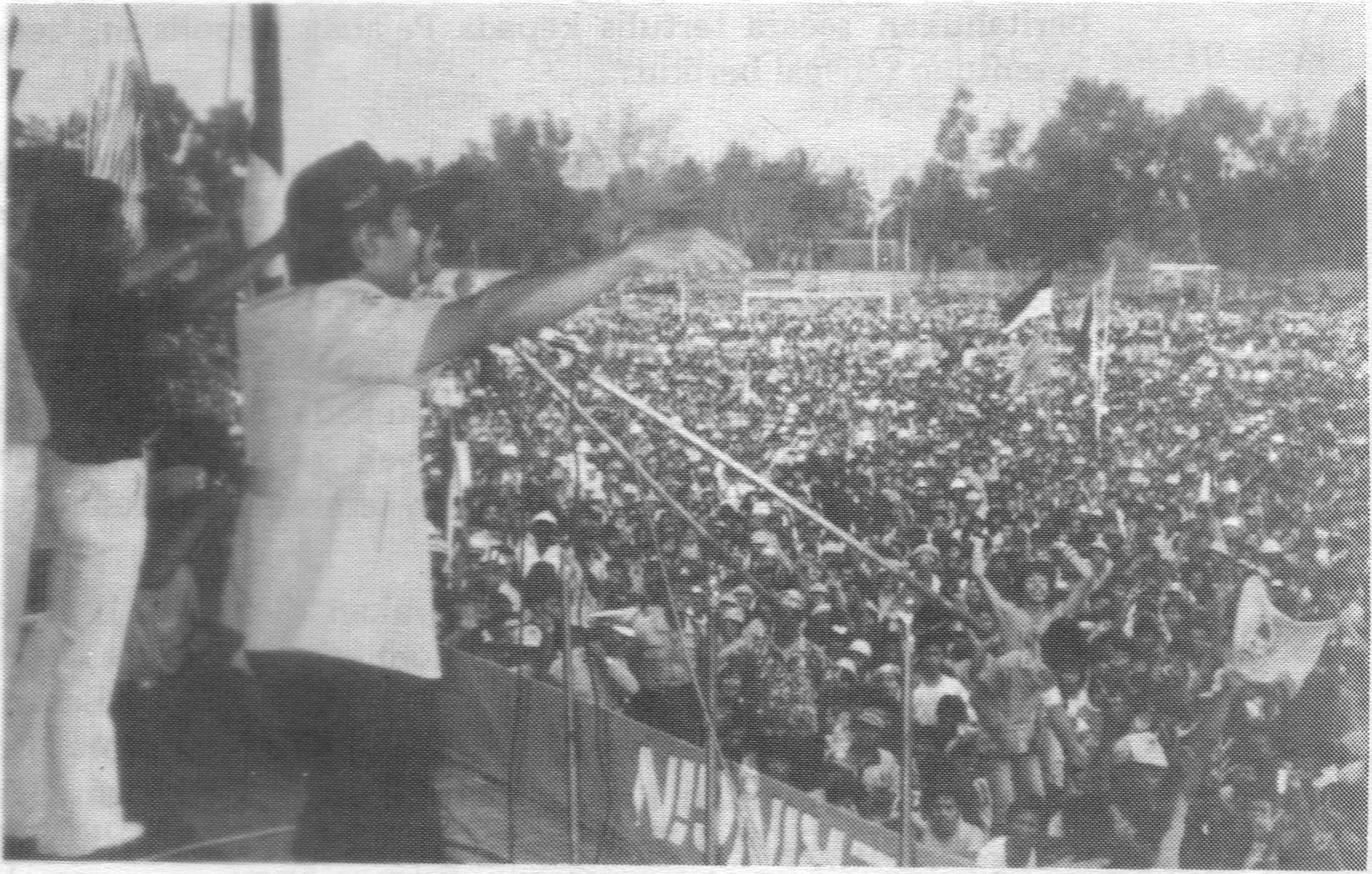
Golkar campaign

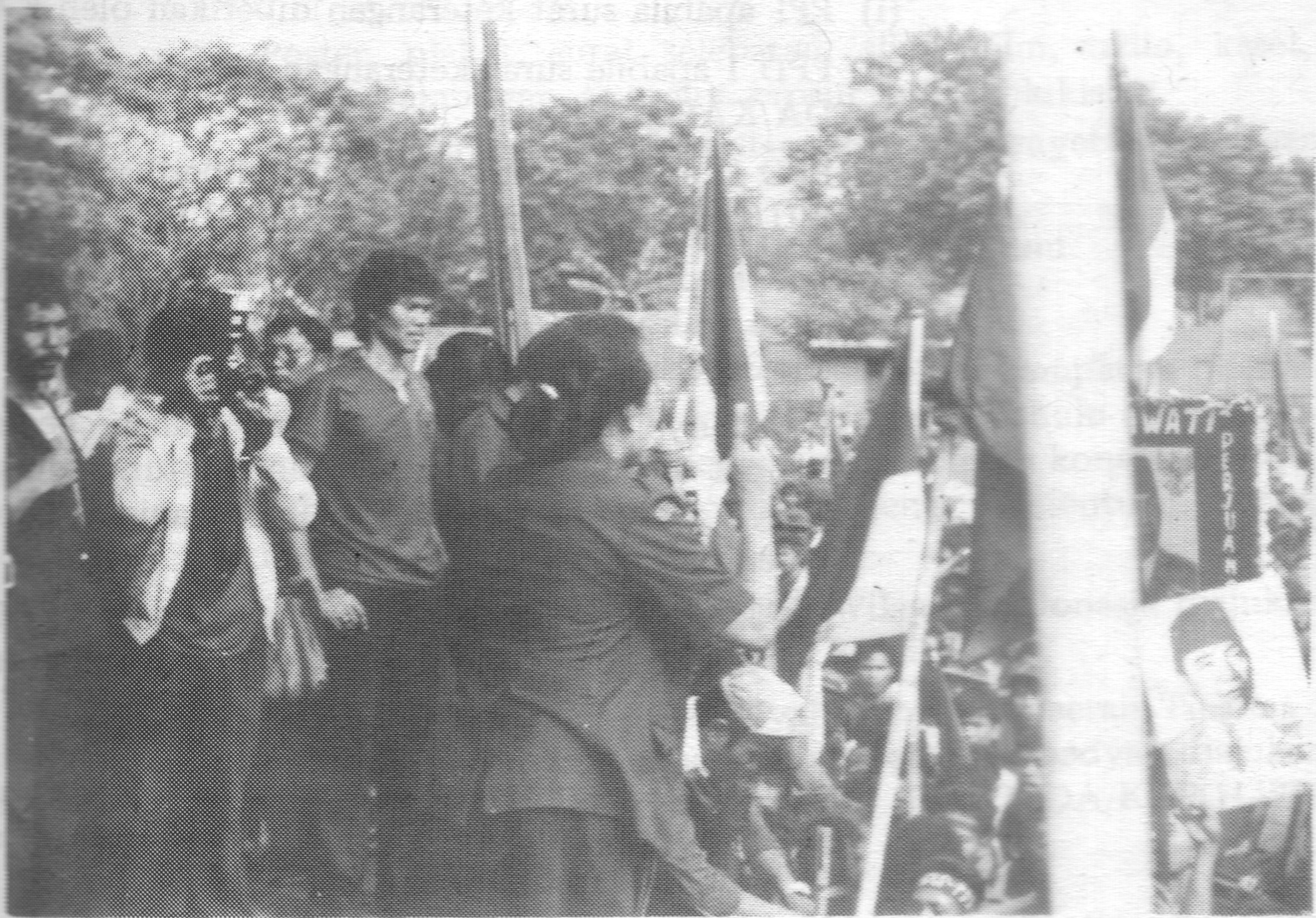
PDI campaign

=== Radio and television campaigns ===
The government of Indonesia had arranged a campaign for the government-appointed central board of the political parties to speak publicly in the television and radio. The broadcasting rights for this digital campaign were held by the TVRI for the televised campaigns, and the RRI for the radio campaigns. The recording of the campaign was held in the respective studios. Only national and private radios and television were allowed relay the campaign on the whole, while individual and organizational radios and television were not permitted to relay the campaign.

Radio campaigns
Round	Date	PPP	Date	Golkar	Date	PDI
1	24 March 1987	R.M.O Mahdi Tjokroaminoto	26 March 1987	Sudharmono (Chairman of Golkar)	28 March 1987	Titi Juliasih (Vice General Secretary of PDI)
2	30 March 1987	Aisyah Aminy (PPP Legislative Member)	1 April 1987	Sri Redjeki	3 April 1987	Benedictus Nahot Marbun (Head of PDI)
3	5 April 1987	Nurhasan Ibnu Hadjar	7 April 1987	Sakti Qudratullah	9 April 1987	Dimmy Haryanto (General Secretary of PDI)
4	11 April 1987	Imam Sofwan (PPP Legislative Member)	13 April 1987	Freddy Latumahina (Golkar Legislative Member)	15 April 1987	Markus Wauran (Vice Treasurer of PDI)

Television campaigns
Round	Date	PPP	Date	Golkar	Date	PDI
1	24 March 1987	Moch. Husni Thamrin	26 March 1987	Sudharmono (Chairman of Golkar)	28 March 1987	Suryadi (Chairman of PDI)
2	30 March 1987	Mudrikah	1 April 1987	A. Sulasikin Murpratomo	3 April 1987	Fatimah Ahmad (Vice Head of PDI)
3	5 April 1987	Imron Rosyadi	7 April 1987	Moch. Tarmoedji	9 April 1987	Sukowaluyo Mintohardjo (Head of PDI)
4	11 April 1987	Jailani Naro (Chairman of PPP)	13 April 1987	Sarwono Kusumaatmadja (General Secretary of Golkar)	15 April 1987	Nicolaus Daryanto (General Secretary of PDI)

== Results ==
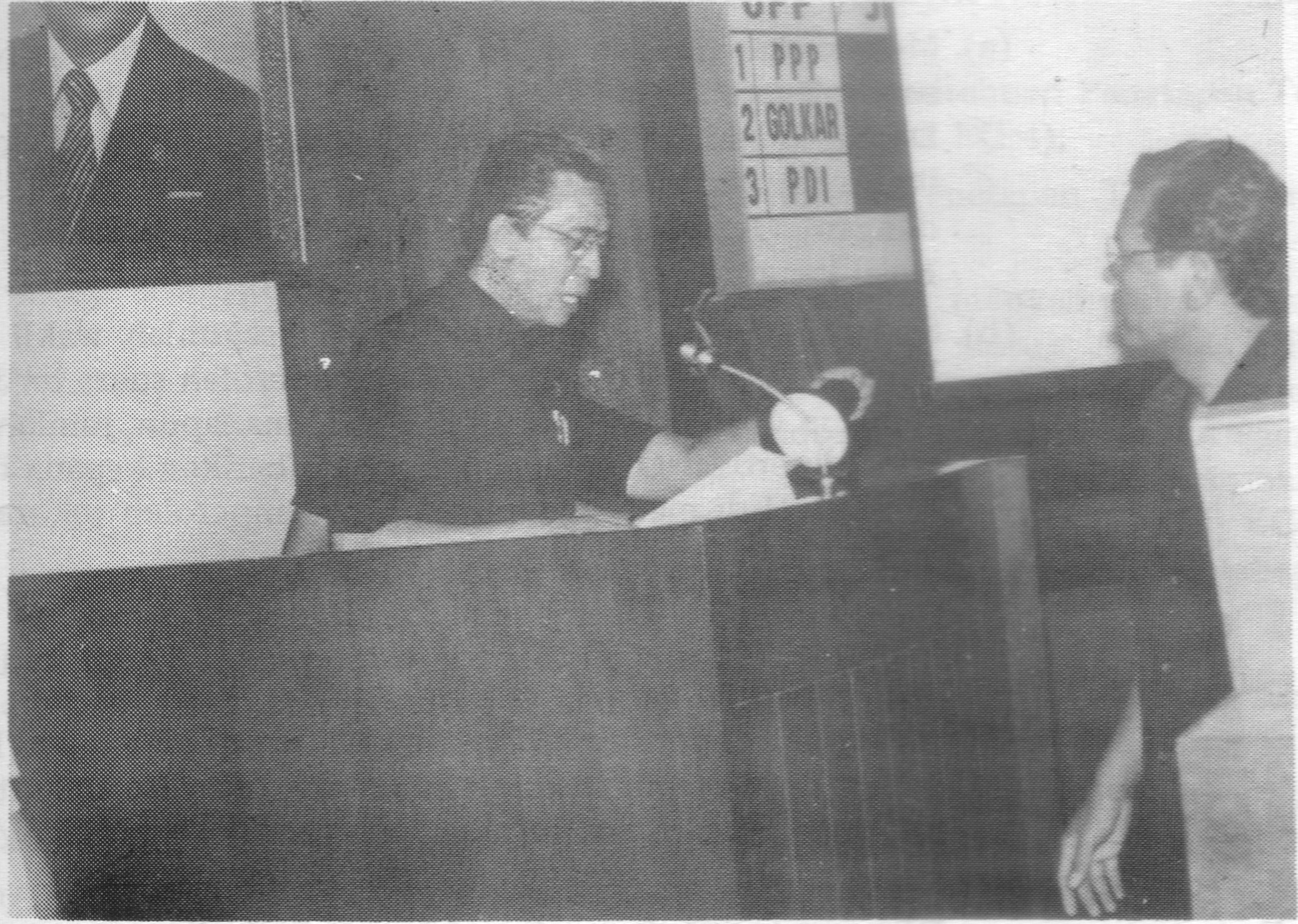
The results of the election being announced by Gunardo as the Vice Chairman of LPU.

As a result of the withdrawal of the NU, the PPP lost more than 40% of its 1982 vote, with Golkar seeing the most benefit. The PPP vote fell in 24 or the 27 provinces. The PDI share of the vote rose by 3%, with its share up by more than a third over 1982. Most of the increases came in western Java, and in Jakarta, the PDI's vote rose to 28.8% from 15.8% in 1982. With the conflicts with the PPP following the departure of the NU, voting for the PDI was the only way of registering a protest against the domination by the military-bureaucracy of the political system. Golkar, meanwhile, achieved its aim in Aceh, and for the first time won an absolute majority of the vote in Jakarta and every other province of Indonesia. This would be the case for every election until the 1998 collapse of the New Order.

Party	Votes	%	Seats	+/–
Golkar	62,783,680	73.11	299	+57
United Development Party	13,701,428	15.96	61	–33
Indonesian Democratic Party	9,384,708	10.93	40	+16
Appointed members			100	0
Total	85,869,816	100.00	500	+40
Registered voters/turnout	93,965,953	–		
Source: Nohlen et al.

== Presidential election ==
Following the legislative election, the People's Consultative Assembly (MPR), the legislative branch of Indonesia, met from 10 to 11 March 1988 to elect both the president and vice president of the country for the 1988–1993 term. On 10 March, Suharto was re-elected president unanimously to a fifth term. Golkar, which had regained its strength after the 1987 election, made the 1988 MPR General Session re-elect Suharto as president. This was certain because Golkar, the party supported by the government, won a landslide victory. This victory certainly had an impact on the results of the 1988 MPR General Session.

Sudharmono, an army general, was subsequently elected vice president on the next day. There was originally a debate about who would be Suharto's vice president. Two of the strongest vice-presidential candidates were Sudharmono and Jaelani Naro. However, the one who was ultimately chosen as Suharto's vice president was Sudharmono. This ended the debate about the vice president between Sudharmono and Jaelani Naro.
