= General Elections Institution =

- Lembaga Pemilihan Umum

Agency overview
- Formed: 17 January 1970
- Preceding agency: Indonesian Electoral Committee
- Dissolved: 1 February 1999
- Superseding agency: General Elections Commission
- Jurisdiction: Indonesia
- Headquarters: Jalan Imam Bonjol No. 29, Jakarta 10310
- Agency executive: Yogie Suardi Memet, Chairman (last)

The General Elections Institution (Indonesian: Lembaga Pemilihan Umum, abbreviated as LPU) was the body that organises elections in Indonesia during the New Order. Its responsibilities include deciding which parties can contest elections, organising the voting and announcing the results and seats won in the various branches of the government. The institution is under the Ministry of Home Affairs.

== History ==
After the rise of Suharto as the president of Indonesia in 1967, Suharto began to prepare for elections in order to legitimize his seat. The first general elections in the New Order was prepared to be held in 1971 with Law Number 15 of 1969. The law stipulates that the president would form the General Elections Institution for the upcoming election. Suharto would later form the General Elections Institution by the Presidential Decree Number 3 of 1970.

According to the law, the General Elections Institution was a permanent institution with three elements, the executive council, the advisory council, and the secretariat. The president appoint the members of the institution with the Presidential Decree Number 7/M of 1970. The first chairman of LPU was Amir Machmud, who was the Minister of Home Affairs at that time. The Minister of Home Affairs would later hold the position for the chairman of LPU until 1998, when the organization was dissolved and replaced with General Elections Commission.

== Seat of the General Elections Institution ==
The Indonesian General Institution is located in a building on Jalan Imam Bonjol 29. The building, designed by architect A.W. Gmelig Meyling, was completed in 1955 and was among the first to be built in the post-war architecture style in Indonesia. It was described as "impressive" at its completion. The building was originally used for the office of the National Horticulture Centre of the Ministry of Agriculture.

== Organization ==
=== Executive Council ===
According to the Government Regulations Number 35 of 1985, the seats of the executive council was filled with ministerial posts. The chairman of the council was seated by the Minister of Home Affairs, while the vice chairman post was seated by the Minister of Information and the Minister of Justice.

== List of chairmen ==
Even though the Minister of Home Affairs concurrently chaired the position of the Chairman of the General Elections Institution, there were no elections held during the ad interim term of Sudharmono, from 1982 until 1983.

Name	Photo	Period	Vice Chairman	General Secretary	Elections
Amir Machmud	Amirmachmud	1970–1982	As Minister of Information: Budiardjo (1970–1973); Mashuri Saleh (1973–1977); Sudharmono (1977–1978); Ali Murtopo (1978–1982); As Minister of Justice: Oemar Seno Adji (1970–1973); Mochtar Kusumaatmadja (1973–1978); Mudjono (1978–1981); Ali Said (1981–1982)	Sumarman	1971
Amir Machmud	Amirmachmud	1970–1982	As Minister of Information: Budiardjo (1970–1973); Mashuri Saleh (1973–1977); Sudharmono (1977–1978); Ali Murtopo (1978–1982); As Minister of Justice: Oemar Seno Adji (1970–1973); Mochtar Kusumaatmadja (1973–1978); Mudjono (1978–1981); Ali Said (1981–1982)	Soeprapto	1977
Amir Machmud	Amirmachmud	1970–1982	As Minister of Information: Budiardjo (1970–1973); Mashuri Saleh (1973–1977); Sudharmono (1977–1978); Ali Murtopo (1978–1982); As Minister of Justice: Oemar Seno Adji (1970–1973); Mochtar Kusumaatmadja (1973–1978); Mudjono (1978–1981); Ali Said (1981–1982)	Soeprapto	1982
Sudharmono		1982–1983	As Minister of Information: Ali Murtopo (1982–1983); As Minister of Justice: Ali Said (1982–1983)		
Soepardjo Rustam	Soepardjo Rustam portrait	1983–1988	As Minister of Information: Harmoko (1983–1988); As Minister of Justice: Ali Said (1983–1984); Ismail Saleh (1984–1988)	Aswismarmo	1987
Rudini	Rudini as Chief of Staff of the Indonesian Army	1988–1993	As Minister of Information: Harmoko (1988–1993); As Minister of Justice: Ismail Saleh (1988–1993)	Nugroho Hardjo Wiyoto	1992
Yogie Suardi Memet	Yogi Suardi Memet	1993–1998	As Minister of Information: Harmoko (1993–1997); R. Hartono (1997–1998); As Minister of Justice: Oetojo Oesman (1993–1998)	Suryatna Subrata	1997

== Bibliography ==
- Abdullah, Taufik (April 2009). Indonesia: Towards Democracy. Solo: Institute of Southeast Asian Studies. ISBN 978-981-2303660.
- Manning, Chris; van Dierman, Peter (April 2000). Indonesia in Transition: Social Aspects of Reformasi and Crisis. Institute of Southeast Asian Studies. ISBN 978-1856499248.
- Merrillees, Scott (2015). Jakarta: Portraits of a Capital 1950-1980. Jakarta: Equinox Publishing. ISBN 9786028397308.
- Puspoyo, Widjanarko (December 2012). Dari Soekarno Hingga Yudhoyono, Pemilu Indonesia 1955 - 2009 (From Soekarno to Yudhoyono. Indonesian General Elections 1955 - 2009). Solo: Eka Adicitra Intermedia. ISBN 9786028237970.
- Kansil, C.S.T. (1986), Memahami Pemilihan Umum dan Referendum [Understanding General Elections and Referendum] (in Indonesian), Jakarta: Ind-Hill-Co
