= International Commission of Control and Supervision =

Vietnam war monitoring force

The International Commission of Control and Supervision (ICCS) was an international monitoring force created on 27 January 1973. It was formed, following the signing of the Paris Peace Accords ("Paris Agreement on Ending the War and Restoring Peace in Vietnam"), to replace the similarly-named International Commission for Supervision and Control in Vietnam (ICSC). The ICCS was led by a director general, with Pudjo Prasetyo of Indonesia as the last officeholder.

== Personnel ==
The organization comprised military and civilian staffs, provided by four nations. Initially, these were: Canada, Hungary, Indonesia and Poland (CHIP). The Canadian and Polish delegations had been present for nearly two decades, whilst the Hungarians and Indonesians were new to the task. For balance, the countries were expressly chosen to represent both the communist nations, Poland and Hungary, and the non-communist nations, Canada and Indonesia.

Canada had previously expressed dissatisfaction, and stayed largely to endure the successful establishment of the new body: It was a member from 29 January until 31 July 1973. The Canadian contingent was then replaced by one from Iran, which served from 1973 to 1975.

Heads of Delegation

- 1973–1973: Michel Gauvin. Canada.
- 1973–197?: Eugeniusz Kulaga. Poland.
- 1973–1974: Károly Kovács (1931–2007). Hungary.

Strength

The four nations made the same contribution: 290 personnel.

- Poland: 290
- Hungary: 290
- Indonesia: 290
- Canada or Iran: 290
- Total: 1,160

Those who had served at least 90 days with the ICCS were eligible for the International Commission of Control and Supervision Medal. As many delegations served for about a year, then between the five nations that participated, it is possible that some 3,000 people might have qualified for this award, but there appear to be no figures, by nation, to qualify this estimate.

== Role ==
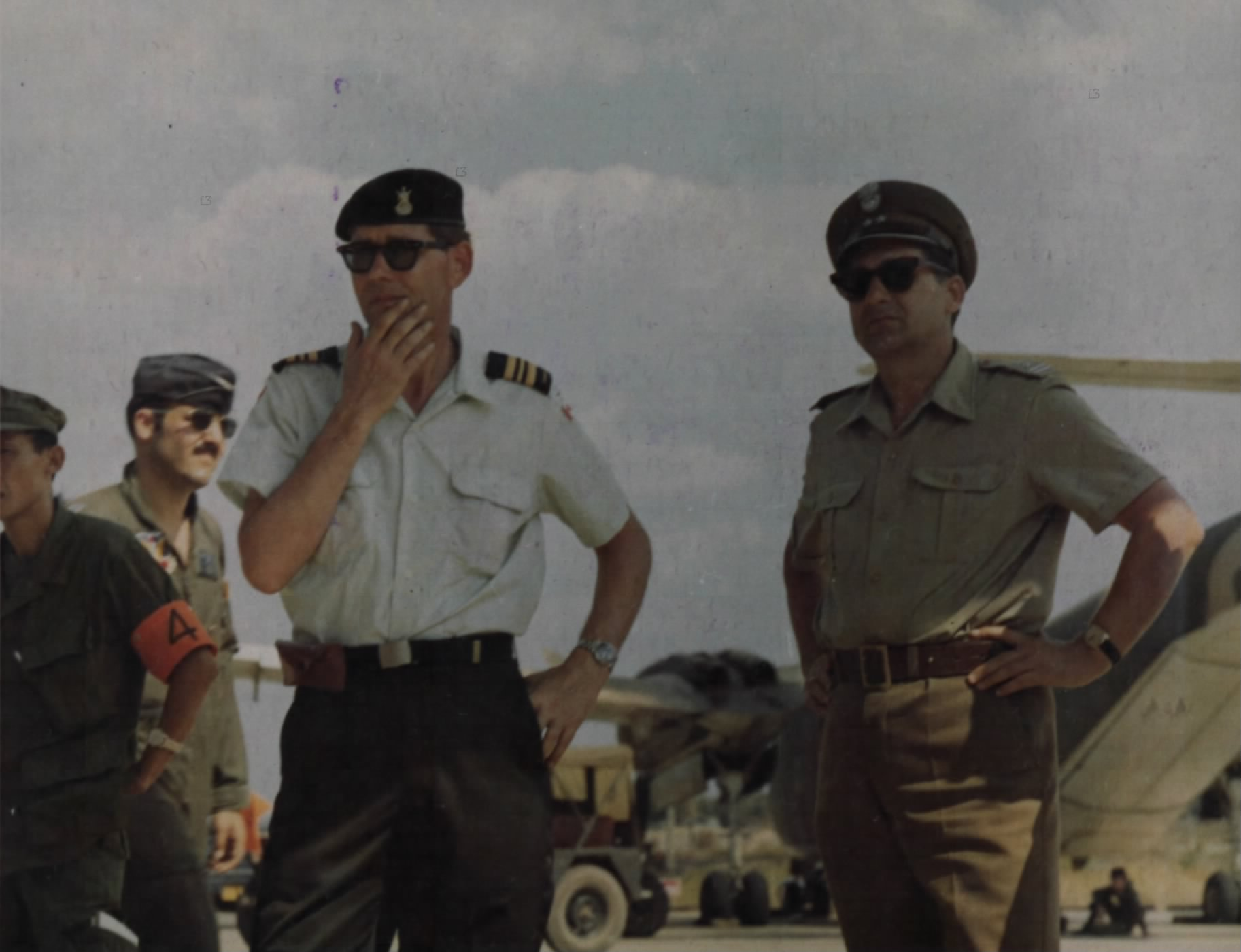
ICCS members observe prisoner release at Bien Hoa Air Base, 26 January 1973

The Protocol to the Paris Agreement detailed the functions of the ICCS. At Article 4 it named the locations of seven regional teams and twenty-six teams within those regions in South Vietnam. It also called for seven teams to be assigned to ports of entry (for replacement of armaments, munitions and war material permitted the two South Vietnamese parties under Article 7 of the Agreement) and seven teams to supervise the return of captured and detained personnel.

In summary, the ICCS was to supervise the cease-fire, the withdrawal of troops, the dismantlement of military bases, the activity at ports of entry and the return of captured military personnel and foreign civilians. It was to report on the implementation, or violation, of the Peace Agreement and Protocols. As with the old ICSC, there were continuous disagreements between the communist and non-communist nations about the causes of treaty violations. Canada attempted to counter this with an "open-mouth policy" to the world's media.

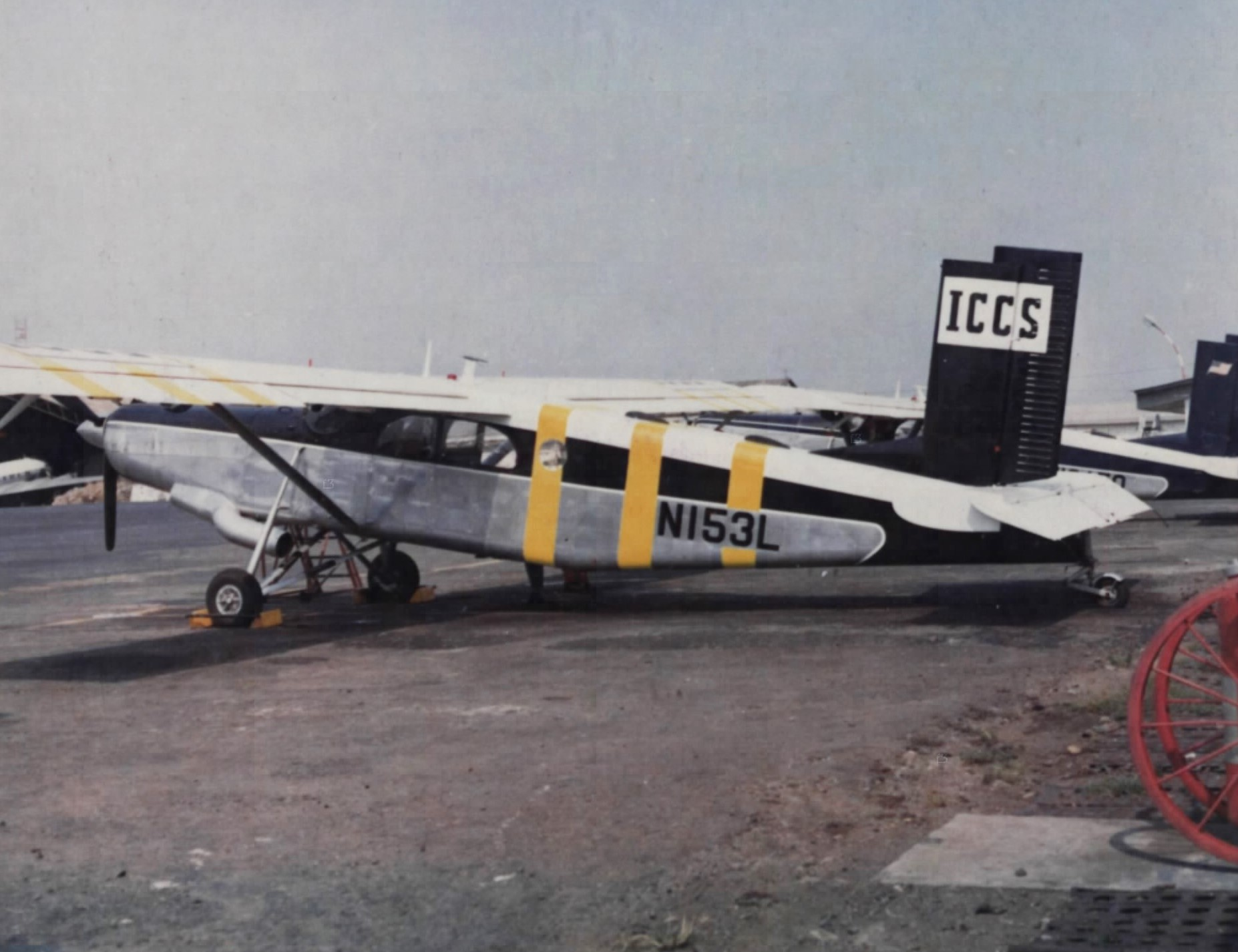
ICCS Pilatus Porter Tan Son Nhut Air Base

ICCS Air Services

For reasons of distance and for reasons of safety, in a time of conflict, the ICCS often traveled by air. Requiring pilots experienced at flying over mountain and jungle, and men accustomed to the unpredictable military background of the region, the ICCS gave a contract to the locally well-established operation, Air America. Initially under the command of Col. J. A. Mitchell, of Canada, this organization gave a coat of white paint to its aircraft and panels indicating 'ICCS', to operate as: ICCS Air Services.

== Losses ==
On 7 April 1973 in Quảng Trị Province, near Route 9, two ICCS helicopters operated by Air America were targeted by People's Army of Vietnam air-defense units. One was hit by anti-aircraft machine-gun fire and managed to land without casualties, the other was struck by a SA-7 missile, leaving no survivors. The helicopters were carrying teams on inspection, and therefore the casualties came from all four contributing nations, plus the contracted aircrew.

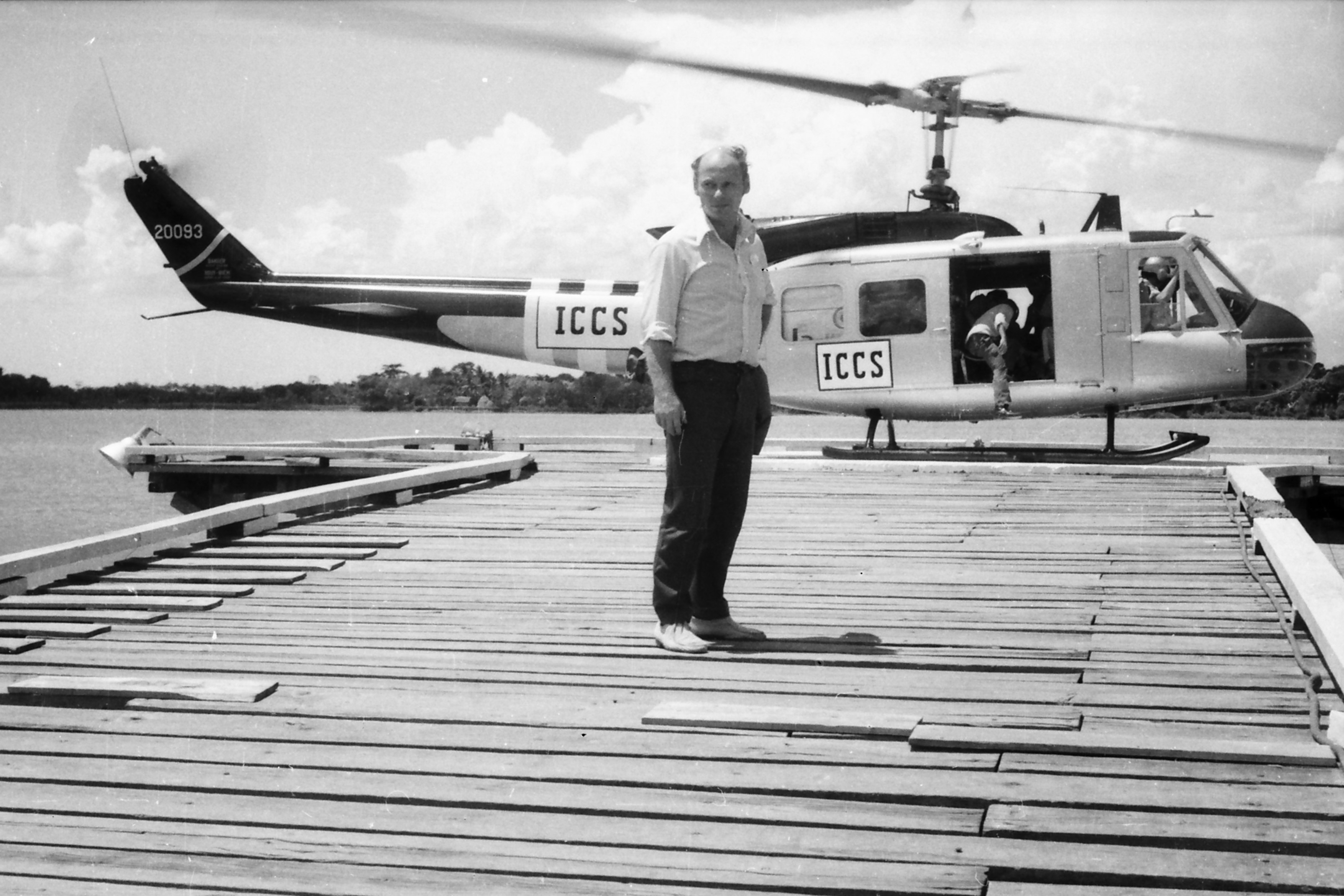
A UH-1H used by the ICCS at Vinh Long

In all, apparently nine people were killed (some sources state eleven, but without any clarification):

- Lieutenant Colonel Gunawan Salam Faiman (1931–1973), Army [ICCS Indonesia]
- Captain Csaba Cziboly (1940–1973), Army [ICCS Hungary]
- Major Aurél Dylski (1939–1973), Border Guards [ICCS Hungary]
- Captain Charles Laviolette (–1973), 12e Régiment blindé du Canada [ICCS Canada]. Capt. Laviolette was the only Canadian fatality with the ICCS, though others were lost with the ICC.
- It seems there were none from Poland on this aircraft, which may possibly be explained by the presence of the two men from Hungary (for Poland, see: ICC)
- PRG (Viet Cong) Liaison Mission: two officers (here unnamed) from Vietnam
- CPT. Terry D. Clark (1944–1973), pilot [aircrew, US]
- CPT. Charles L. Osterman (–1973), co-pilot [aircrew, US]
- Valeriano P. Rosales (–1973), crew-chief [aircrew, Philippines]

The casualties would appear to be: four Observers, two Liaison (ie.'colleagues' of the attacking unit), three aircrew, though many sources obfuscate the red-on-red element; nevertheless, this seems fairly definitive.

During the period there were 18,000 alleged cease-fire violations, which resulted in over 76,000 killed, wounded and missing to both sides: on 29 May 1973 the Canadians announced that they were withdrawing from the ICCS because they had come to supervise a ceasefire but were instead observing a war.
