= Moergito =

Indonesian general and politician

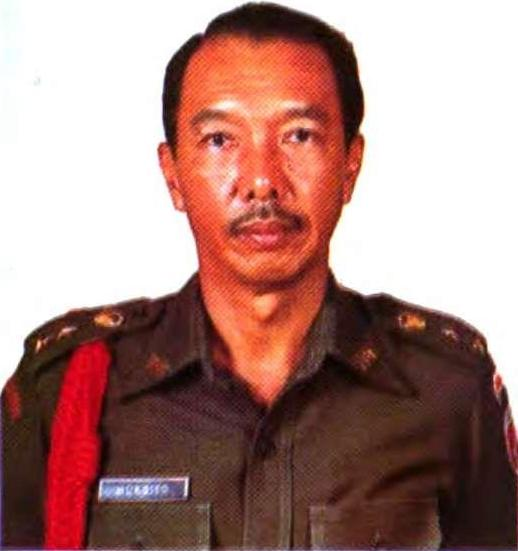
- Born: 18 January 1928 (age 98); Surabaya, Dutch East Indies
- Military career
- Allegiance: Indonesia
- Branch: Indonesian Army
- Service years: 1945–1985
- Rank: Lieutenant general
- Unit: Infantry
- Commands: Armed Forces Academy; Brawijaya Regional Military Command; Mulawarman Regional Military Command; Baladhika Jaya Military Area; 2nd Infantry Brigade
- Conflicts: Indonesian National Revolution; Operation Kraai; Operation Wisnumurti; Vietnam War; ICCS

Moergito (born 18 January 1928) is an Indonesian retired army general and politician. He was the commander of the armed forces academy from 1983 to 1985, during which it underwent transition from directing all military training within the armed forces branches and the police to merely coordinating each academy's training doctrine. He was also the commander of the Mulawarman Regional Military Command from 1980 to 1981 and the Brawijaya Regional Military Command from 1981 to 1983.

== Life and career ==
=== Early life and service in East Java ===
Moergito was born on 18 January 1928 in Surabaya as the second-to-last child out of the eleven children of M. Hastrowikromo and R.A. Soekeni. As his father was a civil servant who had to move from place to place, Moergito followed his father to Wlingi, Blitar by the age of four, while his brothers stayed in Surabaya for their education. He commenced his basic education at the Hollandsch-Inlandsche School during the Dutch colonial era and middle school as well as high school during the Japanese occupation era. Following the Indonesian National Revolution, Moergito enrolled at the 7th division's cadet school, which was based in Malang, in 1945.

Moergito joined the-then fledgling Indonesian army as a junior officer, serving as the commander of the 4th infantry brigade's depot during Operation Kraai. In 1949, Moergito was assigned as a section commander at the 3rd company within the brigade. After the war, Moergito was educated at the army officer school (P3AD, Pusat Pendidikan Perwira AD) in Bandung in 1950. He graduated from P3AD with the rank of second lieutenant and became a platoon commander at the 512th infantry battalion. He was later promoted as company commander in the 527th infantry battalion before undertaking an instructor's course. He subsequently served as a principal instructor at the cadet school of the Brawijaya (East Java) military regional command, the successor to the army's 7th division, for eight years. As instructor, in 1959 Moergito took part in a research of junior officers within battalions. He also took several military-related courses, including an advanced officer's course and a psychological intelligence course. He ascended as the deputy commander of the cadet school in 1961.

Moergito spent most of his career in the Brawijaya (East Java) military regional command, holding various command and technical positions. In 1962, Moergito served as the commander of the 519th infantry battalion, which was under the 10th infantry brigade. In 1963, Moergito's battalion was sent to Papua as part of Operation Wisnumurti, which aimed to pacify the province from separatist forces following the New York Agreement which solified Indonesia's control over the western half of Papua. Between 1967 until 1969, Moergito commanded the Sidoarjo military district, still under the Brawijaya Regional Military Command. He then became the chief of staff, which was the second-in-command, of the 81st Dhirotsaha Jaya military area, covering Madiun and its vicinities. After a short while, he returned to the Brawijaya headquarters to serve as the military command's spokesperson.

By 1970, Moergito, having obtained the rank of lieutenant colonel, underwent further military education at the Indonesian Army Command and General Staff College. After completing college the next year, he was assigned as deputy commander of Brawijaya's logistics command before being entrusted command the Kostrad's 2nd infantry brigade. Moergito's troop was deployed to Vietnam as part of Indonesia's Garuda Contingent to the International Commission of Control and Supervision, which monitors truce between parties of the Paris Peace Accords. He was in charge as commander of the 1st region of the contingent, covering the Huế municipality. Moergito's classmates, which was labeled the "interstitial" army generation, also served as region commanders within the contingent. He had reached the rank of colonel by the time of his duty in Vietnam.

=== Commanding and chief-of-staff positions ===
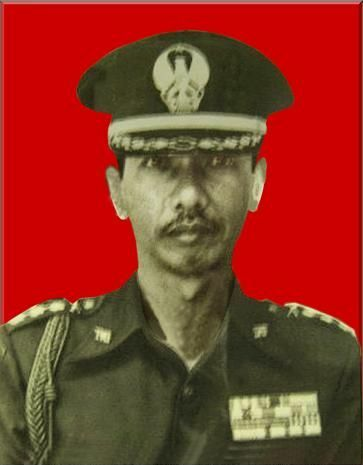
Moergito as commander of the Baladhika Jaya Military Area

Upon his return from Vietnam, in 1973 Moergito was appointed as territorial assistant to the commander of Brawijaya for a few months, before being reassigned to command the 82th Baladhika Jaya Military Area from 1973 to 1975. On 19 February 1975, Moergito was appointed as the commander of the 83th Baladhika Jaya Military Area, with jurisdiction over the Malang metropolitan area in East Java. He handed over his duties as commander on 19 October 1977 and became the chief of staff (second-in-command) of the Mulawarman Regional Military Command, covering the East Kalimantan province. He returned for the same position in East Java in 1978 with a promotion to the brigadier general rank.

On 11 October 1980, Moergito returned to lead the Mulawarman Regional Military Command as commander. His former superior in the Mulawarman Regional Military Command, Erry Soepardjan, had become the province's military command, and the two were seated in the regional coordination forum as representatives of the army and the civilian government. In army readiness rally, defense minister Mohammad Jusuf publicly praised Moergito for ensuring residential ownership for military personnels in East Kalimantan.

About half a year later, on 19 May 1981 Moergito was honorably discharged from his position and was promoted to command the Brawijaya Regional Military Command as a two-star general (major general). He was sworn in as Brawijaya commander on 9 May 1981, with ex officio positions as the chief executive of the East Java Regional Operational Command for the Restoration of Security and Order, chairman of the East Java Functional Council, and the commander of the Surabaya Garrison. Moergito's commanding position also entailed political duties as the armed forces delegate to the People's Consultative Assembly.

Early in his term, Moergito claimed to have got hold of documents detailing the planned kidnapping of the regent of Jember as well as several important officials in the region in retaliation for the forced takeover of fertile lands by the local government in the Jenggawah district. In 1982, Moergito imposed a ban on the production of machetes in two villages in East Java ahead of the 1982 elections; the ban was made shortly after blacksmiths in the region received orders to produce twenty thousand machetes for government agencies, resulting in the blacksmiths nearly losing their jobs as they have to declare bankruptcy for being unable to pay off their loans to Bank Rakyat Indonesia. He handed over his duties to Major-General Soelarso Hakynosoebroto on 21 May 1983.

=== Commanding general of armed forces academy and political career ===
Moergito was further promoted with his appointment as the commanding general of the armed forces academy on 7 June 1983, with him holding the rank of lieutenant-general. Shortly afterwards, Moergito announced that youths with tattoos were ineligible to become military officers, asserting that such markings were an inappropriate way for youth officers to express pride and that soldiers with tattoos were unworthy to become one. Under his leadership, the academy underwent a massive curriculum and organizational change. According to Moergito, the curriculum revision was intended to produce professional officers with stronger character and improved mastery of science and technology to meet evolving demands. These changes include increasing the hours dedicated to kejuangan (national struggle) classes using new historical textbooks and refining specialized training for each military branch and the police.

Under his supervision, the academy was decentralized to individual service academies in order to better foster professional expertise within each specific branch. The academies were renamed to emphasize individual branches instead of being part of the central armed forces academy. In regards to the change, Moergito stated that his role was relegated from directing the education program to coordinator of the academies, as the responsibility for the former have been officially transferred to each branch's chief of staff. Moergito ended his tenure as commanding general on 21 February 1985 and went into retirement. Moergito then joined the board of executives of Pepabri (Persatuan Purnawirawan ABRI), the union of armed forces retirees.

After the 1997 Indonesian legislative election, Moergito was selected once again to serve in the People's Consulative Assembly, this time as a regional delegate representing East Java. Moergito, alongside with five other senior general, participated in the protests that led to the fall of Suharto. Moergito and the senior general demanded Suharto to resign immediately. B. J. Habibie, Suharto's replacement, revoked the ban on the establishment of new parties, and retired army general in support of former defense minister Edi Sudradjat established the Indonesian Justice and Unity Party. Moergito was chosen as the chairman of the party's branch in East Java. During the lead up to the 2004 Indonesian presidential election, Moergito, acting as a spokesperson, voiced his party's support to the Susilo Bambang Yudhoyono-Jusuf Kalla pair. He was also chosen as a compromise figure for the regional campaign manager in East Java. The campaign team had previously experienced internal rifts that led to the ouster of lecturer Fandi Utomo from the position.
