= Sanusi Hardjadinata =

Indonesian politician and diplomat (1914–1995)

Raden Hadji Sanusi Hardjadinata
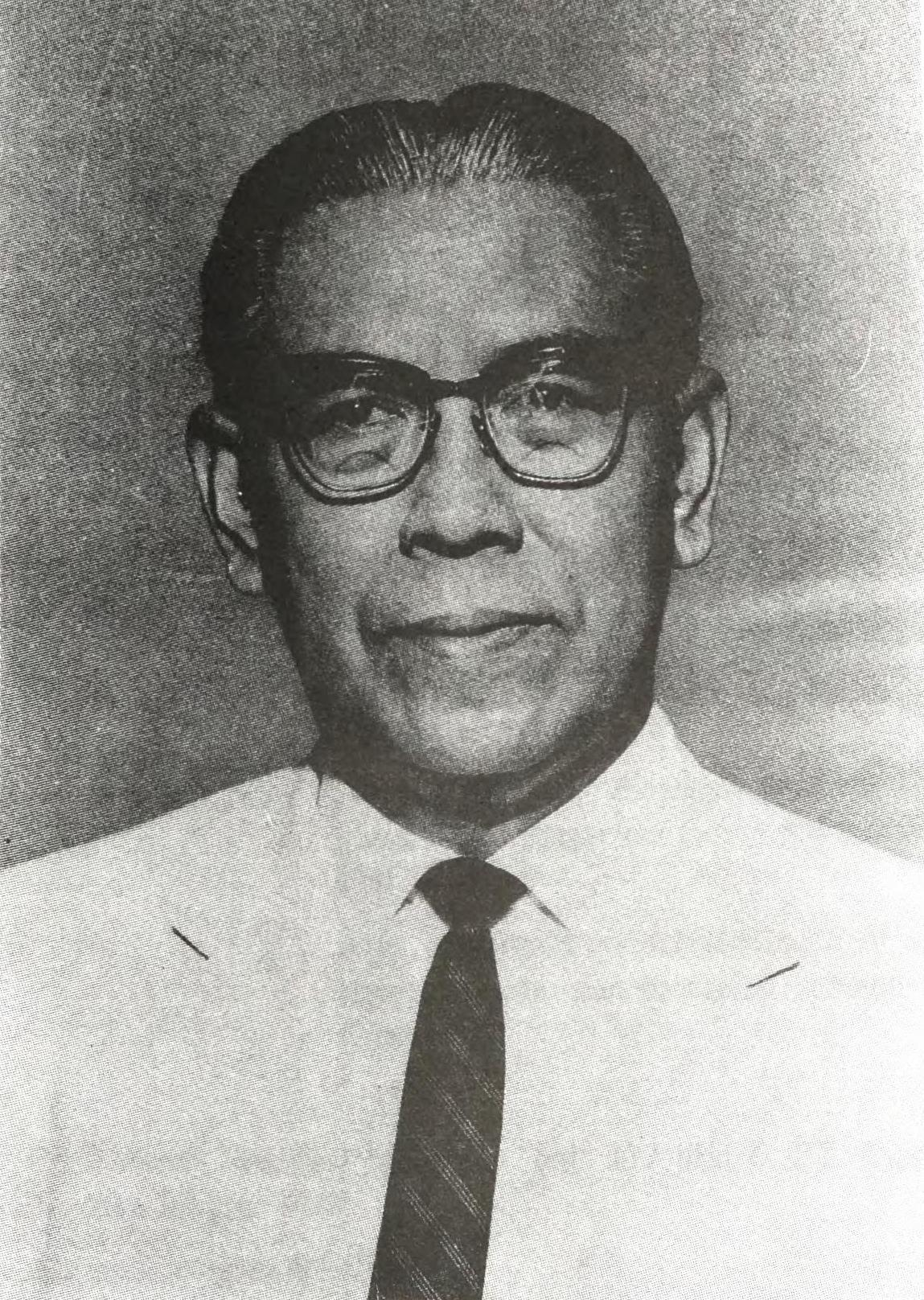
- Official portrait, c. 1957

2nd Chairman of the Indonesian Democratic Party
- In office 20 February 1975 – 16 October 1980
- Secretary-General: Sabam Sirait
- Preceded by: Mohammad Isnaeni
- Succeeded by: Sunawar Sukowati

6th Governor of West Java
- In office 29 June 1951 – 9 July 1957
- Preceded by: Raden Sewaka
- Succeeded by: Ipik Gandamana

Minister of Education
- In office 11 October 1967 – 6 June 1968
- President: Suharto
- Preceded by: Sarino Mangunpranoto
- Succeeded by: Mashuri Saleh

Chief Minister of Industry and Development
- In office 28 July 1966 – 11 October 1967
- President: Sukarno; Suharto
- Preceded by: Office established
- Succeeded by: Hamengkubuwono IX

Minister of Home Affairs
- In office 9 April 1957 – 10 July 1959
- Prime Minister: Djuanda Kartawidjaja
- Preceded by: R. Sunaryo
- Succeeded by: Ipik Gandamana

Member of the Supreme Advisory Council
- In office 1975–1978

Member of the Constitutional Assembly
- In office 9 November 1956 – 5 July 1959

Ambassador of Indonesia to the United Arab Republic
- In office 1959–1964

Personal details
- Born: Samaun; 24 June 1914 Garut, Dutch East Indies
- Died: 12 December 1995 (aged 81) Jakarta, Indonesia
- Resting place: Sirnaraga Public Cemetery
- Party: PDI (1973–1995)
- Other political affiliations: PNI (1947–1964)
- Spouses: Iin Sofiah (m. 1938; died 1986); Theodora Walandouw (m. 1987)
- Children: 8
- Education: Hollandsche Indische Kweekschool (HIK)
- Occupation: Politician; diplomat

Mohammad Sanusi Hardjadinata (born as Samaun; 24 June 1914 – 12 December 1995) was an Indonesian politician who served as the second chairman of the Indonesian Democratic Party (PDI) from 1975 until 1980. Prior to serving as party chairman, held numerous positions during the presidencies of Sukarno and Suharto, including as governor of West Java, member of the Constitutional Assembly, and cabinet minister in the Djuanda and Ampera cabinets.

Sanusi was born to a well-off aristocratic family in Garut, Dutch East Indies (now Indonesia). He was educated at a Dutch school, and worked as a teacher after graduating. Following the proclamation of Indonesian Independence, he was appointed the vice resident of Priangan. In April 1948, he was arrested and detained by Dutch authorities for his opposition to the creation of the Dutch-backed State of Pasundan. He was released in July 1948, and he left for Yogyakarta and later Madiun. There, he helped rebuild the city after the failed communist uprising which occurred a few months earlier. In 1949, he was appointed acting Resident of Priangan, and during the transition from a federal state to a unitary one, he served as the Pasundan state's head of education. In 1951, Sanusi was appointed governor of West Java, though his appointment was initially challenged by the provincial assembly. As governor, he helped organize the Bandung Conference and established Padjadjaran University in 1957.

In 1955, he was elected a member of the Constitutional Assembly, and participated in constitutional debates up until the assembly's dissolution in 1959. In April 1957, he was appointed Minister of Home Affairs by Prime Minister Djuanda Kartawidjaja. Following President Sukarno's 1959 Decree, Sanusi was dismissed as minister, and was appointed Indonesia's ambassador to Egypt instead. He returned to Indonesia in 1964, and was appointed rector of Padjadjaran University. Following the transition to the New Order, Sanusi was appointed as a cabinet minister in the Ampera and the Revised Ampera cabinets under president Suharto. In 1975, he was appointed the Chairman of the Indonesian Democratic Party, replacing Mohammad Isnaeni. Under his leadership, the party suffered from a number of internal conflicts, and he resigned as chairman in 1980. After his resignation from the party, he became involved with the Petition of Fifty. Sanusi died on 12 December 1995, after suffering from complications in his lungs, kidneys, and liver. His body was interred at the Sirnaraga Public Cemetery in Bandung.

== Early life ==
Mohammad Sanusi Hardjadinata, initially given the name Samaun, was born in the village of Cinta Manik, Garut, on 24 June 1914. He was born to a well-off priyayi family, and was the third child of four children. His father, Raden Djamhad Wirantadidjaja, was a local village head, while his mother, Nyi Mas Taswi, was a female aristocrat. At the age of six, he was brought to Cibatu, a small town located in the northern part Garut. There, Samaun lived with Raden Yuda, a doctor and relative of his father. He was then enrolled into the Tweede Klasse Inlandsche School, an elementary school which used local language as its language of instruction. During his time in Cibatu, his name was changed from Samaun to Sanusi, as according to Yuda, it was too similar to the name of Semaun, the first chairman of the Communist Party of Indonesia.

Later on, Sanusi moved to Tasikmalaya, where he lived with Bik Endeh, Yuda's daughter. However, due to the harassment he received from Bik Endeh he moved to the neighboring house of Bik Mariah. While in Tasikmalaya, he resumed his education at a different Tweede Klasse School. However, he wasn't able finish his education, as he moved back to Cibatu after only finishing his first grade. Back in Cibatu, he was raised by his older brother, Idris Hardjadinata, and entered the local Hollandsch-Inlandsche School (HIS). In the school, he became known as Sanusi Hardjadinata, as most students in the school mistakenly recognized Idris as his father. After two years in Cibatu, Sanusi moved to Bandung. There, he enrolled at the local Hollandsch Inlandsche Kweekschool (HIK), graduating in 1936. From there, he became an educator, and began working as a teacher at a Muhammadiyah school in Jakarta. As a teacher, Sanusi made around 25 gulden a month. After a year of teaching at the school, a friend offered him a teaching position at a school in Muara Dua, Palembang. He accepted the offer, and moved to Muara Dua. While his pay was doubled to 50 gulden a month, Sanusi only taught at the school for 6 months, as his physical condition worsened. He later left for Baturaja, in what is today Ogan Komering Ulu Regency. However, Sanusi didn't stay long as he moved back to Bandung, with his teaching duties being substituted by future-major general Abdul Haris Nasution.

== National Revolution ==
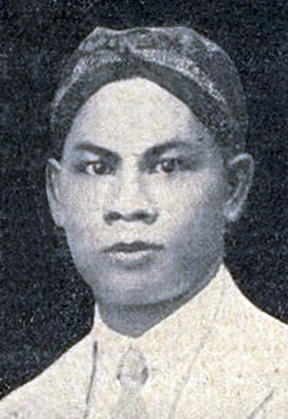
State Minister Oto Iskandar di Nata, c. 1920's

Several days following the Proclamation of Indonesian Independence, Sanusi was elected to the office of Vice Resident on 1 September 1945, by the Indonesian National Committee of Priangan. During the first few years following the proclamation, the residency was an instrumental part of running the government. As the government system was still largely influenced by the Japanese system, which prioritized the residency as the center of local government. As Vice Resident, Sanusi became very close with State Minister Oto Iskandar di Nata. When Oto was kidnapped by a group called the "Laskar Hitam", Oto sent a letter to his wife, telling her ask Sanusi if she needed any form of assistance. Oto was eventually murdered by the "Laskar Hitam". During the National revolution, heavy fighting took place in the city of Bandung, which was then set ablaze. As a result, the Provincial Government of West Java evacuated to Garut, with his house being used as the office of the government of Priangan Residency. Around c. 1947, Sanusi was elected the Chair of the Indonesian National Party (PNI) branch in Garut.

The government remained in Garut for most of the revolution, with only a short stint in Tasikmalaya, after the signing of the Linggadjati Agreement, which ended after the Dutch launched Operation Product. In Garut, the officials of the government began to be arrested by Dutch forces after refusing to cooperate with the Dutch in establishing the State of Pasundan. This included officials such as Mayor of Bandung, Ukar Bratakusumah, Secretary of the Governor of West Java, Raden Enokh, and the resident of Priangan, Raden Indung Ardiwinangun. Sanusi continued to live in his village in Garut, but his location was later discovered by Dutch authorities. Sanusi and his family took refuge in the valley located on the east side of the village. This attempt failed, as a few days later, a group of Dutch soldiers came looking to arrest him.

He was then brought to Bandung, and was officially arrested on the Tampomas street, with an official letter dated 14 April 1948. Several months later, on 25 July 1948, he was freed from prison on the condition that he must leave West Java and set for Yogyakarta, where the Republican government's capital was at the time. On 28 October 1948, he left Yogyakarta for Madiun. In Madiun, he was appointed as a high ranking employee for the Resident of Madiun. There, Sanusi had to recover the war-torn Madiun Residency, which was devastated by the 1948 Communist rebellion, led by the People's Democratic Front. Several months later, on 18 June 1949, Sanusi returned to Bandung. There, he was appointed by the Indonesian Government as the Acting Resident of Priangan in the shadow government of West Java, competing with the Dutch-backed government of the State of Pasundan. Later, during the handover of the State of Pasundan to the central government of the United States of Indonesia, Sanusi was appointed as the state's head of education.

== Early Political career ==
=== Governor of West Java ===
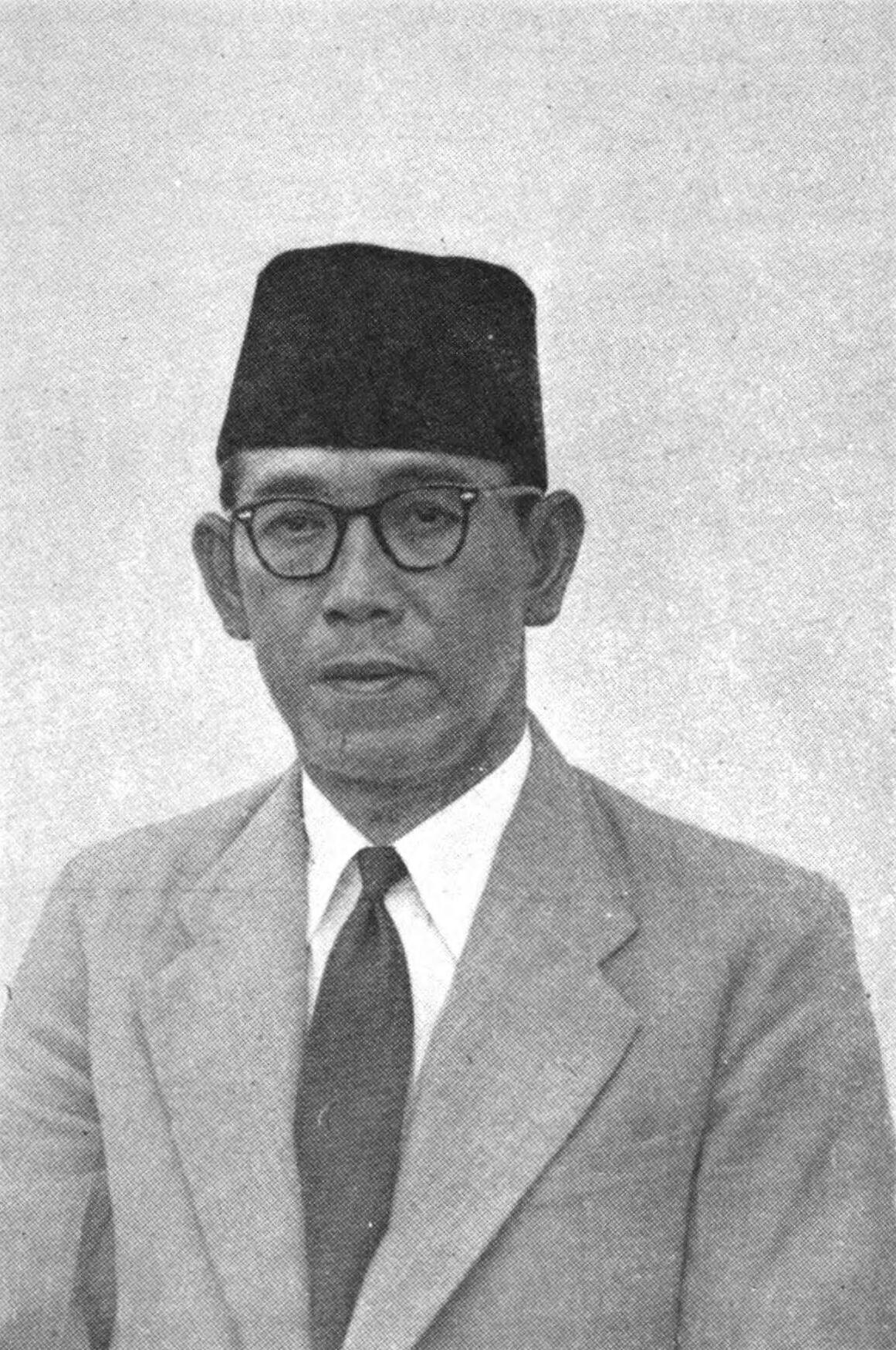
Official portrait as governor, c. 1953

On 7 July 1951, Sanusi was officially inaugurated as Governor of West Java, replacing Sewaka, who was appointed Minister of Defense in the Sukiman Cabinet. He was inaugurated together with the Governor of Central Sumatra, Ruslan Muljohardjo and the Mayor of Jakarta, Sjamsuridjal. His appointment was initially challenged by the West Java Regional Representative Council (DPRD), specifically by the Masyumi Party. Oja Sumantri, a member of the DPRD from the Masyumi, protested that the appointment of the Governor was a violation of the province's autonomy, as it was the Ministry of Home Affairs who appointed him governor, not the DPRD. Despite these challenges, he was supported by other factions of the DPRD, including by the West Java commissariat of the Indonesian Civil Service Association faction. In the end, the DPRD gave up the challenge, and Sanusi remained as governor. During his term, he presided over the Afro–Asian Conference, which was held in Bandung. Ini his capacity as governor, Sanusi was tasked with organizing preparations for the conference. Ensuring the security of Bandung and its surroundings against the threat of the Sekarmadji Maridjan Kartosuwiryo's Darul Islam rebellion.

Additionally, Sanusi had to provide the accommodations and provisions for the delegates. He also checked himself the conditions of the Savoy Homann Bidakara and Prama Grand Preanger hotels, which were planned to be used to accommodate the delegates. A day before the conference, Sanusi was seen riding his Chevrolet car around the site of the conference to ensure the success of the conference. After the end of the conference, Sanusi focused on creating a state university in Bandung. On 14 October 1956, a Committee for the Formation of State University in Bandung was formed, and he was chosen as the patron of the committee. A few months later, on 11 September 1957, the university, Padjadjaran University, was finally established. In 1955, Sanusi was elected a member of the Constitutional Assembly, representing West Java. He participated in constitutional debates up until the assembly's dissolution in 1959. He left the governors office on 9 April 1957, when he was appointed Minister of Home Affairs in the Djuanda Cabinet. He was replaced by his deputy-governor, Ipik Gandamana.

=== Minister of Home Affairs ===
After being appointed the Minister of Home Affairs by Sukarno, Sanusi was deeply involved in the debates of whether to form a new constitution or return to the Constitution of Indonesia in the Constitutional Assembly of Indonesia. Due to the prolonged debates and the West Irian conflict that became more alerting, the Chief of Staff of the Indonesian Army Abdul Haris Nasution declared that Indonesia is in the state of emergency and forcing the prolonged debates to be ended quickly. Finally, on 5 July 1959, President Sukarno issued a presidential decree. Djuanda returned his mandate as the prime minister to Sukarno, and Sanusi Hardjadinata was replaced as the minister of Home Affairs by Ipik Gandamana, which previously had replaced him as the Governor of West Java. Due to his affiliation with the Indonesian National Party, there is an assumption that during his term, members of the party had many advantages in the bureaucracy.

=== Ambassador to Egypt ===
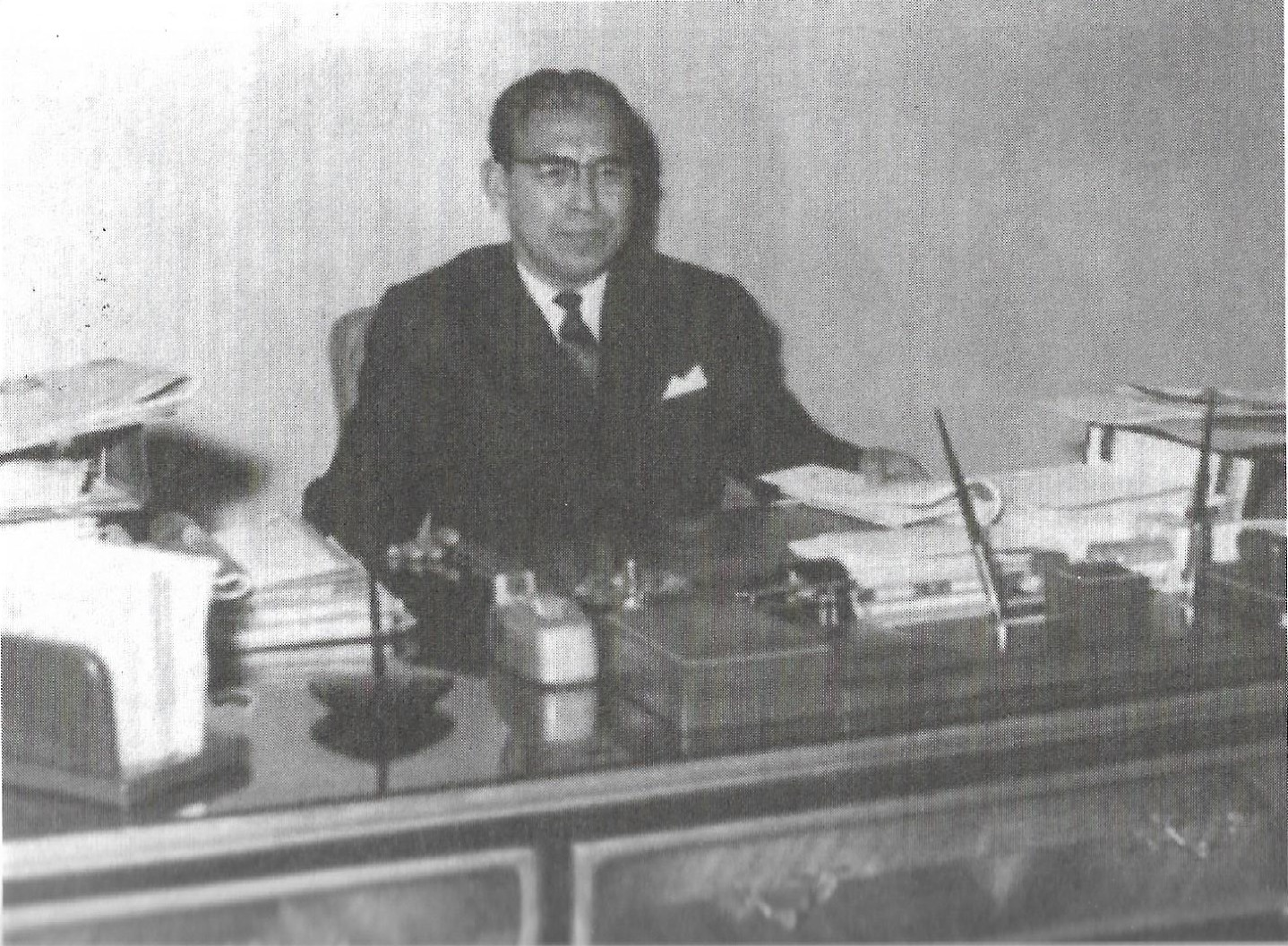
Sanusi Hardjadinata as the Ambassador of Indonesia to Egypt

Sanusi was appointed the ambassador of Indonesia to Egypt, following his dismissal as the Minister of Home Affairs. At first, Sanusi was worried about becoming an ambassador. He felt that he had no previous diplomatic background. When he asked about the problem to Subandrio, the Minister of Foreign Affairs at that time, Subandrio gave him a thick book about the tasks and duties of an ambassador. He read the book before and during his term as the ambassador from 1960 until 1964. The book was very helpful, as Sukarno commenting that his work as an ambassador "wasn't disappointing".

== University rector ==
After four years in Egypt, Sanusi submitted a request to the president to let him go back to Indonesia due to the worsening condition of his wife. The request was fulfilled, but as soon as he arrived in Indonesia, Sukarno asked him to become the Rector of Padjajaran University. At first, Sanusi refused the offer, claiming that he had no previous academic background. (Note: To date, he became the only rector of the university with no academic title.) Even though he refused, he had no power to reject it, and by the Presidential Regulation No. 29, Sanusi was officially appointed by the president as the rector of the university from 20 April 1964.

During his term, the university was filled with political competitions between political parties and organizations; many lecturers became affiliated to a certain political party. The students were grouped into several groups, such as the nationalist groups, communist groups, and Islamic groups, the latter was frequently dubbed as the "green group". The conflicts between the groups were reflected in various activities, such as the student senate. Due to the political affiliation of the senate chairman to the Indonesian National Student Movement (Indonesian: Gerakan Mahasiswa Nasional Indonesia, GMNI) — the student wing of the Indonesian National Party — the senate's stamp is very similar to the emblem of the party.

The 30 September Movement also occurred during his term. The movement, which sparked mass arrests and executions of communists, also involved college students, unexcepted to Padjajaran University (Unpad) students. Many Unpad students demonstrating against the Communist Party of Indonesia and Sukarno. Clashes occurred between KAPPI (the demonstrators) and the Indonesian National Student Movement, which supported Sukarno. To cope with this problem, Sanusi requested the help of the Dean of the Law Faculty of Unpad, Sri Soemantri. Sri Soemantri was the youngest member of the Constitutional Assembly in 1957. He also tasked the Chancellor for Student Affairs of Unpad, Yuyun Wirasasmita, to expel lecturers, deans, or students that were allegedly involved in communist activities.

== Later political career ==
=== Dismissal from the PNI ===
At the beginning of 1964, the Communist Party of Indonesia (PKI) began to get closer with Sukarno. PKI supported every policy made by Sukarno, and the party also formed the Association for Promoting Sukarnoism earlier in 1963. Due to this position, the Indonesian National Party began to adapt its ideology to make it closer to Marxism and communism. In the session of the Working Committee of PNI in Bandung from 13 until 17 November 1964, the party decided that the ideology of the party, Marhaenism was declared as "Marxism with Indonesian characteristics". The decision caused right-wing members of the party to be expelled.

On 4 August 1965, Sanusi, along with 150 other leaders of the party from different regions of Indonesia was dismissed after being accused as "fake marhaenists", capitalists, and feudalists. The chairman of the party, Ali Sastroamidjojo, gradually increased left-wing members of the party. Even though Sanusi was expelled from the party, Sanusi still maintained good relations with Sukarno. Sukarno persuaded the dismissed members to continue forcing the party to hold an extraordinary congress. This was very odd, as Sukarno himself ordered the dismissal and the Ali faction was very reluctant to hold an extraordinary congress.

=== Minister of Industry ===
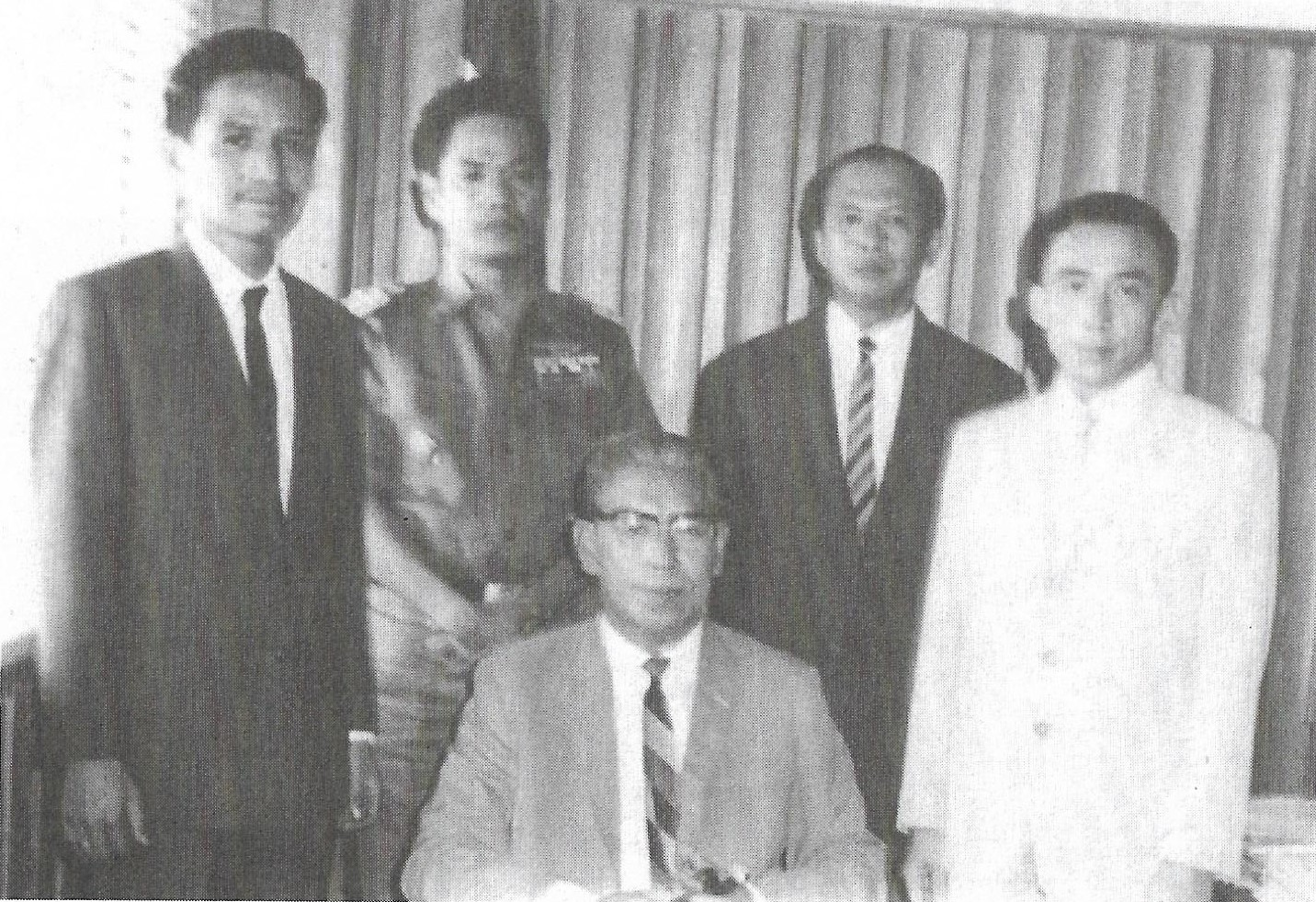
Sanusi (sitting) along with other ministers of the Industry and Development section

After Sukarno failed to restore order and law following the 30 September incidents by forming the two revised Dwikora cabinets, Sukarno handed over his position to the acting president of Indonesia, Suharto. Suharto then formed the Ampera Cabinet on 28 July 1966, which became the first cabinet in the New Order era. In the cabinet, Sanusi was appointed as the Chief Minister of Industry and Development. In his position, Sanusi supervised the Department of Public Works headed by Sutami, the Department of Textile and Handicraft Industry headed by Sanusi, the Department of Basic Industries, Light Industries, and Energy headed Mohammad Jusuf, and the Department of Mining by Bratanata.

=== Minister of Education ===
After the replacement of the Ampera Cabinet by the First Revised Ampera Cabinet on 17 October 1967, Sanusi was appointed the Minister of Education by Suharto. During his office as the Minister of Education, the only school building he inaugurated was the building of the Bandung Senior High School No. 11. Following the formation of a new cabinet, Sanusi was replaced as the Minister of Education by Mashuri Saleh.

After his replacement as the Minister of Education, Sanusi became a high-ranking employee seconded to the Ministry of Home Affairs from 1968 until 1970. He retired from the ministry in 1971. From 1975 until 1978, Sanusi was appointed by Suharto as a member of the Supreme Advisory Council. During his term, the council was headed by Wilopo, a former prime minister of Indonesia. There weren't any reports on his works in the council, as everything that the council advised to the President must be kept in secret.

=== Chairman of the PDI ===
On 10 January 1973, the five political parties: Indonesian National Party, League of Supporters of Indonesian Independence, Murba Party, Indonesian Christian Party, and the Catholic Party signed a declaration that officially merged the parties into the Indonesian Democratic Party. The Deputy Speaker of the People's Representative Council Mohammad Isnaeni was elected as the chairman of the party, while the former secretary-general of the Indonesian Christian Party Sabam Sirait was elected as general secretary. A year after the establishment of the party, there was a conflict between the chairman of the party, Mohammad Isnaeni, with Sunawar Sukowati, the head of the party and the Minister of Welfare at that time. Sunawar, supported by the former Indonesian National Party members, stated that the formation of the Central Executive Council (CEC) of the party must be made proportional based on the number of seats obtained in the 1971 election. Thus, Sukowati wanted to reshuffle the entire CEC of the party in a congress, including the chairman seat.

Meanwhile, Mohammad Isnaeni, supported by the other parties, stated that the congress must only inaugurate the existing CEC rather than forming a new CEC. This means that Isnaeni wanted to keep his position as the chairman of the party. This difference of opinion cause conflict in the party. During this conflict, Sanusi emerged as a neutral party. He stated that he would accept both statements with the condition that both parties have a will to confer; the personal interests of both parties will not be conferred; third parties would not intervene in this conflict. Sanusi's solution wasn't accepted by both parties, and on 17 January 1975, Sunawar and Isnaeni stated their will to resign from their post. The conflict was known by President Suharto, and on 16 February 1975, Suharto called Abdul Madjid and Sabam Sirait about the conflict. Suharto suggested that Sanusi should be the chairman of the party. Suharto had told Sanusi about his suggestion earlier on an event in the Indonesia University of Education. On 20 February 1975, Isnaeni officially handed over the chairman post to Sanusi.

Several days after seating the post of chairman, the former parties agreed to hold a congress as soon as possible, in the face of the upcoming election. Sanusi was tasked with preparing the congress and further meetings by the CEC and the party's council was held in the house of Dr. Hasjim Ning. The first congress was finally held from 12 until 13 April 1976. It was planned that Sanusi would open the congress, but he later went sick, and he was replaced by Usep Ranudwidjaja. The congress was finally opened at 15.30 on the Istora Gelora Bung Karno after being delayed for seven hours. The congress was attended by about 1300 delegates which represented 191 out of 216 branches of the party. During the congress, several delegates who do not have any identification card forced their way into the congress site. Abdul Madjid went to the sick Sanusi and asked him what to do about the commotion. Sanusi suggested that he should allow the delegates outside the congress site to enter. This decision proved right, as no casualties occurred during the congress. The congress was finally closed by Sanusi himself on 13 April 1976. In his final speech, Sanusi stated that the fusion of the party has been completed through the congress.

Even though the congress had finished, the party was still being plagued with internal conflicts. Those who did not agree with the leadership of Sanusi began to bring the internal conflicts of the party into the surface. During the 1978 General Session of the People's Consultative Assembly, there was a conflict between the position of the deputy speaker of the People's Representative Council for the party. The military fraction, supported by Golkar and PPP, agreed to nominate Mohammad Isnaeni as the deputy speaker, while PDI itself nominated Usep Ranuwidjaja. Due to the large support of Isnaeni, he was elected as the deputy speaker. Regarding the issue, PDI felt that the party wasn't being represented in the council.

After several years into Sanusi's leadership, there were already signs of polarization in the leadership of the party. Isnaeni began to reconcile with Sunawar, and bring Achmad Sukarmadidjaja, the head of PDI in Sanusi's leadership, and Marsoesi, the chairman of the East Java branch of PDI. The faction began calling for an extraordinary congress, which in turn would overthrow the Sanusi-Usep faction. Achmad warned Sanusi to hold an extraordinary congress but was ignored. Achmad's faction announced a unilateral reshuffle of the CEC on 25 November 1977. The reshuffle only affected former PNI members. Sanusi's position as the chairman of the party was replaced by Isnaeni, and other functionaries of the CEC was replaced. The reshuffle caused the party to be split into two factions. The reshuffle CEC was supported by the former members of IPKI and Murba, while the CEC led by Sanusi was supported by the former members of the Indonesian Christian Party and the Catholic Party.

The dualism of leadership inside PDI caused the external intervention of the government through the State Intelligence Coordinating Agency (BAKIN), which was represented by Ali Murtopo. Ali was appointed by the government to resolve the problem. On 16 January 1978, both factions agreed to form a new CEC, on which Isnaeni and Sukowati would be installed as the head of the party. The agreement didn't solve the conflict, as was later known, that the reshuffle CEC had already formed new branches, causing dualism of leadership at the regional level. This was used by Sanusi against Isnaeni and Sunawar, where Sanusi relinquished Isnaeni and Sunawar from their position. Isnaeni and Sunawar retaliated by firing Sanusi as the chairman on behalf of the Indonesian National Party.

The conflict caused the emergence of a minor third party, dubbed as the "Tugu Group". The group threatened both CEC to finish the internal conflict immediately, or the group will take over the CEC. The group held meetings in Pandaan to prepare a plan that would overthrow Sanusi, Isnaeni, and Sukowati from the party. The group consisted of members of the CEC, functionaries of the Pancasila Youth, and members of the Marhaen Youth Movement. Even though the group had plans, there was no clear intent about what the group would do. The conflict escalates to its peak when a group of youths from the party tried to barge into the party's office in Diponegoro Street. To avoid physical clashes, Sanusi handed over the keys of the office to the Kopkamtib and entrusted the security of the office to Kopkamtib. The office was later sealed. Since then, a real attempt to reconcile both factions began. Kopkamtib proposed to form an ad hoc committee to resolve the problems. The committee was finally dissolved on 6 September 1980, when both CEC was announced as the United CEC of PDI, and the tasks of the CEC was back to normal.

On 16 October 1980, Sanusi held a press conference in the office of PDI. Accompanied by his colleagues, he announced that he was resigning from the party. The decision was made a day before. On the evening of 15 October, Sanusi called his typist and stated that he wanted to resign as the chairman of the party. He then swore his typist not to tell it to anybody prior to 16 October. Sanusi later revealed that his resignation was due to his attempt to keep his mental stability. The conflicts that struck the party caused personal pressures to him. On one occasion, he also revealed that he was pressured by Suharto to sack Usep and Abdul Madjid, his colleagues, as the functionaries of the party. On another occasion, he told one of his students, Eka Santosa, that since the conflict occurred, he was offered an amount of money and the position of commissioner in any government bank if he was willing to resign. Without accepting the offers, he resigned voluntarily.

== Later life ==
=== Criticism of Suharto ===
After his resignation from the party, Sanusi became more involved in the 1945 Institution for Constitution Awareness (Lembaga Kesadaran Berkonstitusi 1945, LKB 1945). The institution was established on June 1, 1978, by Mohammad Hatta, and Sanusi became one of the members since 1978. The organization was the main opposition to the Suharto regime, due to it being filled by former influential ministers and politicians in the Sukarno era. The members of this organization then issued the Petition of Fifty on 5 May 1980, which criticized Suharto's compulsory instruction in the state philosophy, Pancasila.

Suharto later revoked the signatories' travel privileges and forbade newspapers from printing their pictures or quoting them. Members of the group were unable to obtain bank loans and contracts. Even so, the signatories formed the Petition of Fifty Working Group, based on Ali Sadikin's house. Sanusi frequently came to the working group meeting and gave advice. A year later, one of the members of the Petition of Fifty, HR Dharsono, issued the Petition of Sixty-One on 21 August 1981. The content of the petition was similar to the previous one, but this time, Sanusi was put as number one in the list of signatories, meaning that he officially opposed the government. Due to his support to the petition, Sanusi was ignored and disrespected by several politicians and government officials in the events at the Gedung Sate.

=== Death and funeral ===
At a quarter past midnight on 12 December 1995, Sanusi died after suffering complications in his lungs, kidney, and liver. He had been treated since 1993, and since 29 October 1995, he was put under intensive treatment under the supervision of Dr. Demin Sheng and Dr. Frans. He was buried at the Sirnaraga Public Cemetery on 12 December 1995, with the inspector Lieutenant General Mashudi.

== Personal life ==
Sanusi was married to Iin Sofiah on 12 May 1938. Sofiah lived in his aunt's house. Sofiah and Sanusi went to the same school, but Sofiah was a year younger than Sanusi. Sofiah was the daughter of Muhammad Abdullah Kusumah Atmadja, the head of a people's bank in Ciamis, commonly known as Juragan Ajun and Siti Rukayah. Iin Sofiah gave birth to eight children. Iin died on 28 April 1986 after suffering from heart disease.

A year later, on 8 November 1987, Sanusi married Theodora Walandouw, a member of the Indonesian Democratic Party. He stated that the marriage was not a political marriage, but based on love, as he and Theodora were both widowed. Sanusi had already met Theodora since 1952 when he was the Governor of West Java and Theodora as the Chairwoman of the Indonesian Women Congress of Bandung.
