= Indonesian Democratic Party =

Political party in Indonesia (1973–2003)

Indonesian Democratic Party Partai Demokrasi Indonesia
- Abbreviation: PDI
- Chairperson: See list: Mohammad Isnaeni (1973 – 1976); Sanusi Hardjadinata (1976 – 1981); Sunawar Sukowati (1981 – 1986); Suryadi (1986 – 1993); Megawati Sukarnoputri (1993 – 1996); Suryadi (1996 – 1998); Budi Hardjono (1998 – 2003)
- Secretary-General: See list: Sabam Sirait (1973 – 1986); Nico Daryanto (1986 – 1993); Alexander Litaay (1993 – 1996); Buttu Hutapea (1996 – 1999)
- Founded: 11 January 1973
- Dissolved: 10 January 2003
- Merger of: Indonesian National Party; League of Supporters of Indonesian Independence; Murba Party; Indonesian Christian Party; Catholic Party
- Succeeded by: Indonesian Democratic Party of Struggle (de facto); Indonesian Democratic Vanguard Party (de jure)
- Headquarters: Jakarta, Indonesia
- Youth wing: Indonesian Buffalo Youth Movement
- Ideology: Pancasila; Marhaenism; Left-wing nationalism Democratic socialism Indonesian nationalism Progressivism (from 1990 onwards); Factions: Murbaism; Anti-communism
- Political position: Big tent Minority: Left-wing
- Ballot number (1977–97): 3

The Indonesian Democratic Party (Indonesian: Partai Demokrasi Indonesia, PDI) was a political party in Indonesia which existed from 1973 to 2003. It was one of two legal political parties in Indonesia during the New Order regime of President Suharto, the other being the United Development Party. It was founded as a government-imposed merger of several nationalist and Christian parties.

== Origins ==
Ten political parties participated in the 1971 legislative elections, a number that President Suharto considered to be too much. Suharto wished that political parties be reduced to just two or three and that the parties should be grouped based on their programs. The electoral system itself already limits the electoral field by eliminating independent candidates and requiring that each party has at least 20 percent of seats in the DPR.

The basis for the merger that would result in the birth of PDI was a coalition of the five Nationalist and non-Islamic Parties in the People's Representative Council (DPR) called the Democracy Development Faction. This faction consisted of the Indonesian National Party (PNI), the League of Supporters of Indonesian Independence (IPKI), Murba Party (Partai Murba), the Indonesian Christian Party (Parkindo), Catholic Party (Partai Katolik).

On 10 January 1973, as part of Suharto's program to reduce political parties, these five parties were merged to form PDI.

== Factions ==
The PNI, the largest of the PDI's five parties, and the legatee of Sukarno, had its base in East and Central Java. IPKI had been strongly anti-PKI in the Old Order in contrast to the once-leftist Partai Murba. Even more heterogeneous than the United Development Party (PPP), the PDI, with no common ideological link other than the commitment to the Pancasila as its sole principle, was faction-ridden and riven with personality disputes.

This factionalism was displayed in the 1977 Indonesian legislative election, the first Legislative Elections that PDI participated in. The Party was unable to show a united front and would come third and last in the 1977 legislative election.

== Government intervention ==
The 1977 legislative election would also see a tense political battle between Golkar and PPP. The government became worried that with PDI struggling to function as a party, Indonesian society would be polarized into a secular camp (Golkar) and an Islamic camp (PPP). To counter this, the Government decided to actively intervene into PDI's affairs and make it into a 3rd party to prevent the polarization that it feared.

Measures were taken by the government to keep PDI going as a party which at one time involved the Minister of Home Affairs to arrange PDI's Congresses for them. Efforts were also made to encourage PDI, such as refurbishing the tomb of the late President Sukarno in 1978 and officially recognizing him as the "Hero of Independence Proclamation". This recognition of Sukarno was a change from the earlier New Order policy of playing down his achievements or ignoring him altogether.

== PDI in New Order ==
Until Suharto's fall in 1998, PDI was the smallest political party in Indonesia. Despite playing up its Sukarnoist heritage when campaigning, PDI continued to come last in the legislative elections.

== Schism with Megawati Sukarnoputri ==
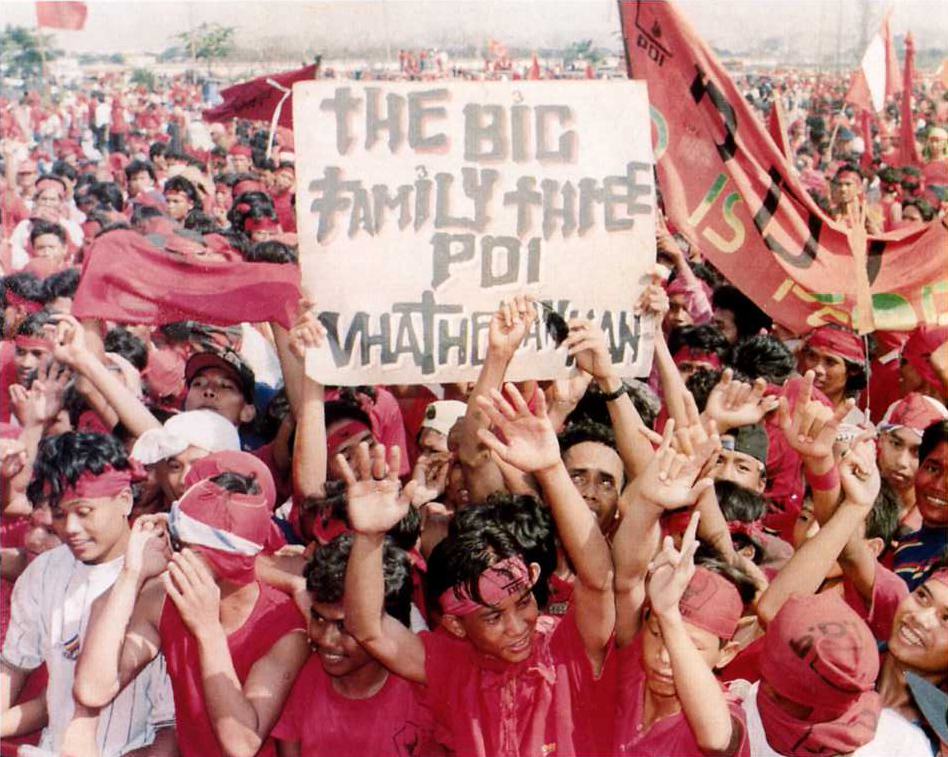
Indonesian Democratic Party rally in Jakarta, 7 May 1997.

At the 1993 National Congress, Megawati Sukarnoputri was elected as the Chairperson of PDI to replace Suryadi. The government refused to recognize this and continued to push for Budi Harjono, their candidate for the Chairpersonship to be elected. A Special Congress was held where the Government expected to have Harjono elected, but Megawati once again emerged victorious. The victory was consolidated when a PDI National Assembly ratified the results of the Congress.

In June 1996, the government finally made its move. Another National Congress was held in Medan, where Megawati was not invited to come along and attended by anti-Megawati members. With the Government's backing, Suryadi was re-elected as PDI's Chairperson. Megawati refused to acknowledge the results of this congress and continued to see herself as the rightful leader of PDI.

Suryadi began threatening to take back PDI's Headquarters in Jakarta. This threat came true during the morning of 27 July 1996. That morning, Suryadi's supporters (reportedly with the government's backing) attacked the PDI Headquarters and faced resistance from Megawati supporters who had been stationed there ever since the National Congress in Medan. In the ensuing fight, Megawati's supporters managed to hold on to the headquarters.

A riot then ensued, followed by a crackdown by the government. The government would later blame the riots on the People's Democratic Party.

PDI was now divided into two factions, Megawati's faction and Suryadi's faction. In the 1997 Indonesian legislative election, Mega and her faction threw their votes behind PPP while PDI languished with only 3% of the votes.

In October 1998, after Suharto's fall, Megawati declared the formation of Indonesian Democratic Party of Struggle (PDI-P) to differentiate her faction of PDI from the government-backed one.

== 1999 legislative elections and aftermath ==
PDI participated in the 1999 legislative election and won two seats, but refused to ratify the election results. This was not enough to pass the electoral threshold to allow the party to participate in the following elections in 2004. After failing to join with other parties to reach the threshold, the party renamed itself the Indonesian Democratic Vanguard Party.

== Chairpersons ==
No.	Name	Potrait	Constituency / title	Term of office		Election results
No.	Name	Potrait	Constituency / title	Took office	Left office	Election results
Preceding parties: Indonesian National Party, League of Supporters of Indonesian Independence, Murba Party, Indonesian Christian Party and Catholic Party
General Chairpersons of the Indonesian Democratic Party (1973–2003)
1	Mohammad Isnaeni (1919–2002)		Rep for Central Java	14 January 1973	13 April 1976	–
2	Sanusi Hardjadinata (1914–1995)		Member of Supreme Advisory Council	13 April 1976	16 October 1980	1976 Unopposed
3	Sunawar Sukowati (1922–1986)		Vice Chairman of Supreme Advisory Council	16 October 1980	12 January 1986 (Note: died in office)	1981 Unopposed
–	Interim Collective Leadership			12 January 1986	2 May 1986	–
4	Suryadi (1939–2016)		Rep for DKI Jakarta (Note: since 1 October 1987)	2 May 1986	27 August 1993	1986 I Gusti Ngurah Gde Jaksa – ✗ Soerjadi – ✓ Jusuf Merukh – ✗ Hardjantho Sumodisastro – ✗ Mohammad Isnaeni – ✗ Achmad Subagyo – ✗ Sutoyo Probosutedjo – ✗
–	Latief Pudjosakti (1950–1997) (Caretaker)		–	27 August 1993	22 December 1993	–
5	Megawati Sukarnoputri (born 1947)		Rep for Central Java	22 December 1993	27 July 1996	1993 Unopposed
6	Suryadi (1939–2016)		Rep for DKI Jakarta (Note: until 30 September 1997)	27 July 1996	27 August 1998	1996 Unopposed
7	Budi Hardjono (1939–2003)		Rep for East Java (Note: until 30 September 1999)	27 August 1998	10 January 2003	1998 Unopposed
Succeeding parties: Indonesian Democratic Party of Struggle (1999) (Note: Megawati's faction) and Indonesian Democratic Vanguard Party (2003) (Note: Hardjono's faction)

== Legislative election results ==
Election	Ballot number	Leader	Seats		Total votes	Share of votes	Outcome of election
Election	Ballot number	Leader	No.	±	Total votes	Share of votes	Outcome of election
1977	3	Sanusi Hardjadinata	29 / 360		5,504,757	8.60%	Governing coalition (until 1978)
1977	3	Sanusi Hardjadinata	29 / 360		5,504,757	8.60%	Opposition (from 1978)
1982	3	Sunawar Sukowati	24 / 360	▼5	5,919,702	7.88%	Opposition
1987	3	Suryadi	40 / 400	▲16	9,384,708	10.87%	Opposition
1992	3	Suryadi	56 / 400	▲16	14,565,556	14.89%	Opposition
1997	3	Suryadi	11 / 425	▼45	3,463,225	3.06%	Opposition (until 1998)
1997	3	Suryadi	11 / 425	▼45	3,463,225	3.06%	Governing coalition (from 1998)
1999	32	Budi Hardjono	2 / 462	▼9	655,052	0.62%	Opposition
