= Indonesian Buffalo Youth Movement =

Indonesian Buffalo Youth Movement (Indonesian: Gerakan Banteng Muda Indonesia (GBMI)) was the youth wing of PDI, which was formed in May 1991. The movement was formed by Suryadi, the chairman of the Indonesian Democratic Party, as a way develop networks of thugs to intimidate and pressure his opposition.
