= Suryadi (politician) =

Indonesian politician

- ꦯꦸꦒꦾꦝꦶ
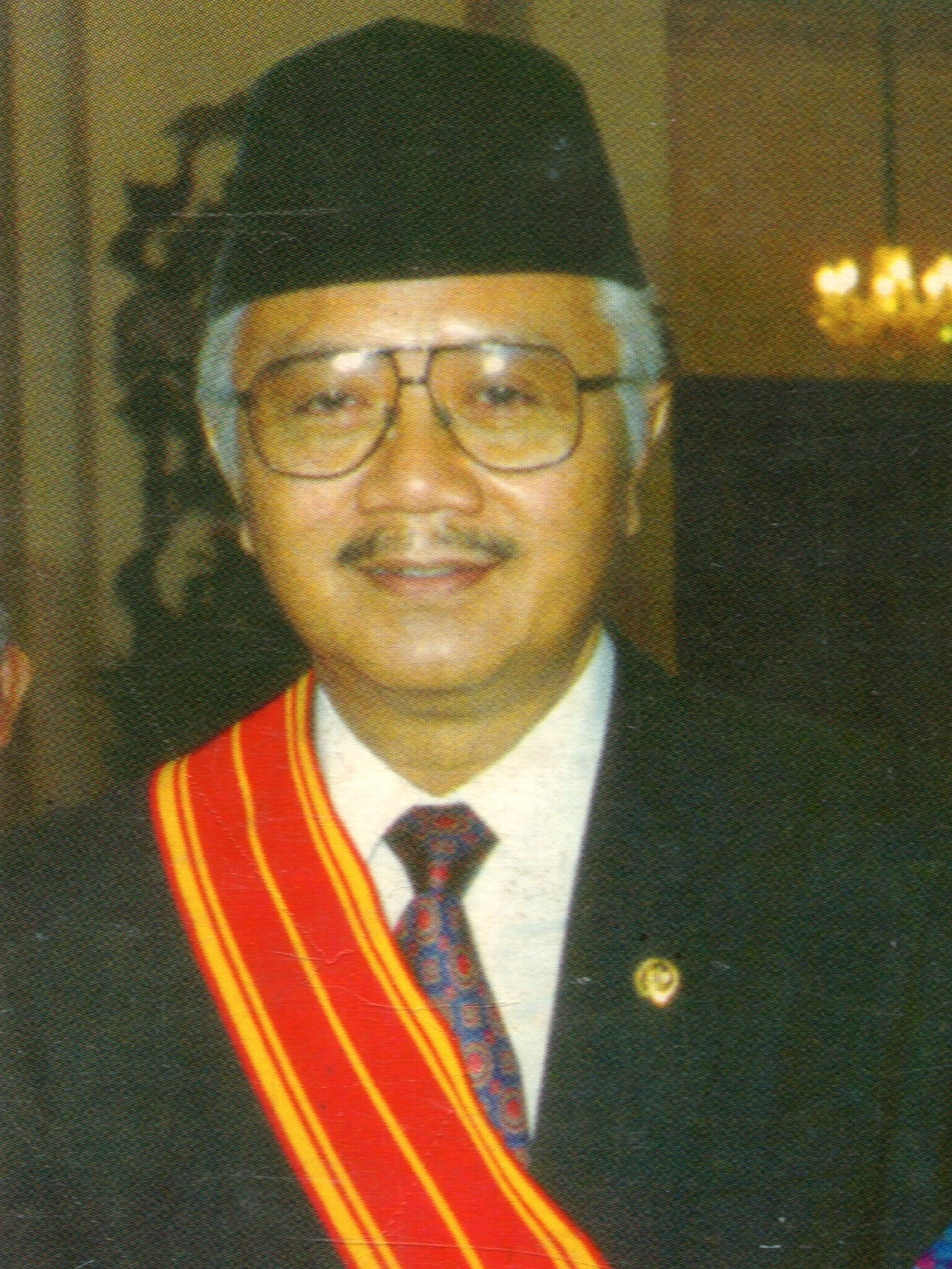

Chairman of Indonesian Democratic Party
- In office 27 July 1996 – 27 August 1998
- Preceded by: Megawati Sukarnoputri
- Succeeded by: Budi Hardjono
- In office 2 May 1986 – 27 August 1993
- Preceded by: Sunawar Sukowati; Interim Collective Leadership
- Succeeded by: Latief Pudjosakti (caretaker)

Deputy Speaker of the People's Representative Council
- In office 1 October 1987 – 1 October 1997
- Speaker: Kharis Suhud; Wahono
- Preceded by: Hardjantho Soemodisastro
- Succeeded by: Fatimah Achmad

Member of the People's Representative Council
- In office 1 October 1987 – 30 September 1997
- Constituency: DKI Jakarta
- In office 28 October 1971 – 30 September 1982
- Constituency: Central Java

Member of the People's Representative Council of Mutual Assistance
- In office 7 July 1966 – 28 October 1971

Member of the Supreme Advisory Council
- In office 1983–1987
- Chairman: Maraden Panggabean

Chairman of Indonesian National Student Movement
- In office 1966–1976
- Preceded by: Bambang Kusnohadi
- Succeeded by: Alwi F As.

Personal details
- Born: 13 April 1939 Ponorogo, Residentie Madioen, Oost Java, Dutch East Indies
- Died: 4 June 2016 (aged 77) Jakarta, Indonesia
- Cause of death: Kidney disease
- Resting place: Tanah Kusir Cemetery, South Jakarta; 6°15′12″S 106°46′11″E
- Party: PPDI (2003–2016)
- Other political affiliations: PNI (1959–1973); PDI (1973–2003)
- Spouse: Sri Hartati Wulandari (m. 1969)
- Children: Primastri Suryandari; Bergas Kampana Haryadita; Lanang Trihardian
- Awards: Mahaputra Star

Suryadi (Javanese: ꦯꦸꦒꦾꦝꦶ, romanized: Suryadhi; 13 April 1939 – 4 June 2016), alternatively spelled as Soerjadi, was an Indonesian politician who served as the chairman of the Indonesian Democratic Party from 1986 until 1998. He became prominent for his faction's involvement in the 27 July 1996 incident, or more commonly known as the Kudatuli incident.

He died on 4 June 2016 in Pertamina Central Hospital, Jakarta at the age of 77.

== Early life and education ==
=== Early life ===
Suryadi was born in approximately 1939, in Ponorogo, East Java. His actual birth date was unknown; the official birth date of "April 13, 1939" was given by his school headmaster during his final exam in the people's school as one of the prerequisites to enlist in the final exam. Suryadi was born from a father who was a lurah (head of community) and from a mother who was a market vendor.

His dad died when Suryadi was seven. His dad's position as a lurah was replaced by Soerjadi's brother-in-law. Even though his brother-in-law was the head of community, his life was still same as the other villagers. He was raised completely by his mother, and accompanied his mother as a market vendor, selling vegetables and fruits from village to village, and taking care of his younger brother.

=== Education ===
In Suryadi's village, the People's School is limited to 3rd grade, while generally people's schools in Indonesia ends in the 6th grade. To finish his primary education, he went to a school in his sub-district, which is about 5 kilometres (3.1 mi) away from his village. After school, he went to the library at the Sub-District Information Bureau. He frequently read and borrowed books there, making him the only regular visitor in the library.

== Activism ==
=== Member of GMNI ===
After graduating from high school, Soerjadi entered the Indonesian National Student Movement (Indonesian: Gerakan Mahasiswa Nasional Indonesia, GMNI), the youth wing of Indonesian National Party (Indonesian: Partai Nasional Indonesia, PNI), in 1959. His interest to PNI began since he was a child; his brother was popularly known as one of the founders of PNI in his village. He also regularly read the newspapers of PNI.

He entered the Yogyakarta branch of the movement. At first, he was offered as the member of the commissariat. His job in the commissariat was relatively small. He actively joined GMNI's events, but only participated in lightweight tasks, such as installing posters and banners. He refused to do heavier tasks, due to the consideration that it might disrupt his study.

=== Chairman of GMNI ===
In the end of 1965, the party was split into two faction: the pro-communist Asu (Note: "Asu" means "dog" in the Javanese language.) (Ali Sastroamidjojo-Surachman) faction and the anti-communist Osa-Usep (Osa Maliki-Usep Ranawidjaja). Even though the Asu faction was bigger, Suryadi sided with the Osa-Usep faction, due to the growing anti-communist movement in Indonesia. The split in the party continued to the GMNI, where Suryadi was chosen in 1966 as the chairman of the GMNI from the Osa-Usep faction. The faction formally declared its anti-communist stance on 7 October 1965, six days after the 30 September Movement occurred.

During his term as the chairman of GMNI, Suryadi engineered several breakthrough, such as the normalization of the relationship between GMNI and HMI (Muslim Students' Association), which frequently clashed prior to his term. He organized the normalization by holding several meetings between the delegates of GMNI and HMI. He also became one of the initiators of the informal Cipayung Group, a group of students association, which in turn formally formed the Indonesian Youth National Committee in 1973.

== Political career ==
=== Early political career ===
His entry to the party began when the party secretariat opened a job vacancy for undergraduate employees. At that time, he wanted to work at the Foreign Department of Indonesia, but his fanaticism to PNI made him accept the job vacancy. He decided to work for only two years, due to the small salary. Eventually, he worked there for several years.

=== People's Representative Council ===
His political career in the Indonesian legislative begins when he was chosen as the representative of PNI from the youth faction in the People's Representative Council of Mutual Assistance. He was sworn in on 7 July 1966, replacing S. M. Thaher. After the 1971 elections, he was elected as the member of the People's Representative Council. He spent two years representing the PNI until the party was fused into the Indonesian Democratic Party.

After the fusion of the PNI into the Indonesian Democratic Party, Suryadi still held his position as a legislative member representing PDI. Suryadi was re-elected in the 1977 elections. During his tenure as member of the People's Representative Council, he became the secretary of the PDI fraction in the DPR and MPR. He also became the chairman of the Commission X of the People's Representative Council from 1974 until 1982, and the coordinator of the Caucus 78 of DPR and MPR. In the 1982 elections, he refused to be nominated again and started to search a job. He was offered by the Wanandi Brothers (Jusuf and Sofyan Wanandi) as a president director in the Aica Indonesia. He accepted the job, and he seated the position from 1982. He served as member of People's Representative Council for over 25 years and made him one of the longest-serving members of the Parliament of Indonesia.

Suryadi's career in the Indonesian government returned in 1983 when he was chosen as the member of the Supreme Advisory Council. He was chosen for three years until 1986 when he became the chairman of the Indonesian Democratic Party.

=== Background ===
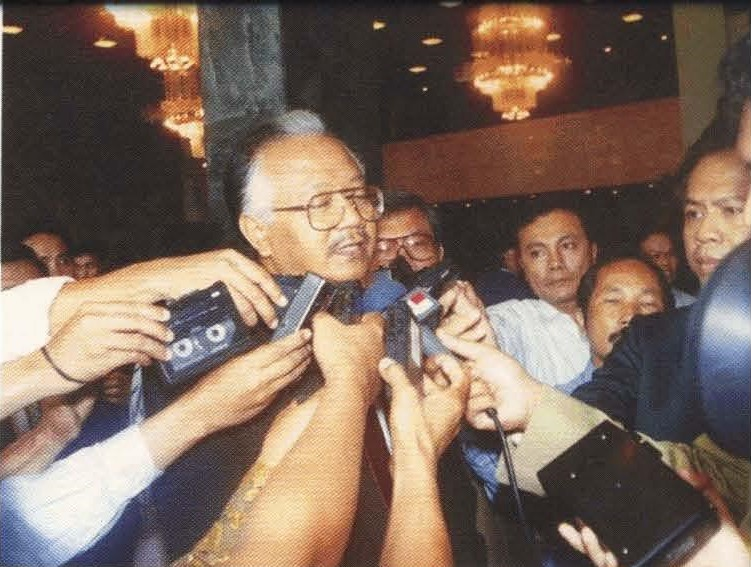
Suryadi being interviewed by reporters.

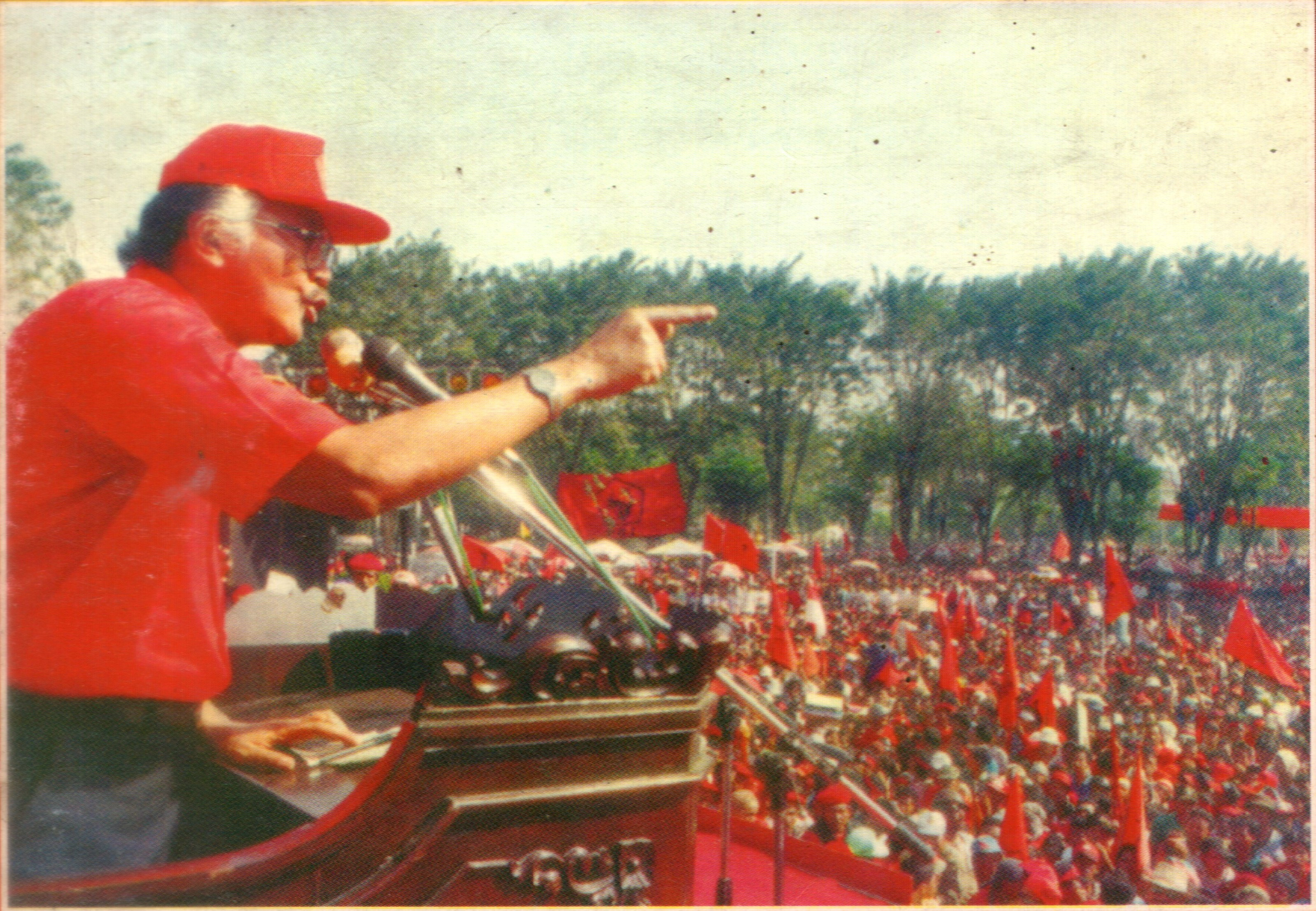
Suryadi campaigning for PDI.

Prior to the third congress of the party, Suryadi became one of the top nominations. His nomination was backed by Benny Moerdani, the Commander of the Indonesian National Armed Forces and the 66' Forces. He was also the brother-in-law of Surono, the Coordinating Minister for Politics and Security. He was able to establish a close relationship due to his accommodative and cooperative stance to the government. He was also "pure" from the previous conflicts of PDI, due to his activity in the People's Representative Council and the Supreme Advisory Council.

Inside the party, Suryadi was supported by the young generation and GMNI. Although he was from PNI, he was not considered a threatening figure by other elements due to his close relationship with the Catholic Party and his renunciation to use his PNI origin and Marhaenism as a political weapon.

=== Chairmanship ===
The third congress of the party went in chaos, and the closing of the congress were delayed to 18 April 1986, for what it should be 17 April. The disorganization of the congress caused Soepardjo Rustam, the Minister of Home Affairs at that time, in fury. The congress failed to choose the chairman, and the task was handed over to the Ministry of Home Affairs. The ministry went on to consult with different figures in the party.

During the consultation, the ministry were requested to choose the chairman based on several criteria. For example, the Aceh branch of the party, along with three other branch, demanded that the candidate should be a Muslim. Several other criteria demanded by the figures of the party is the chairman should be clean from past conflicts, and those who previously seated the Central Executive Committee of the party should not held the chairman position. Based on these criteria, only two candidates left: Achmad Soebagyo and Suryadi.

Another implicit criterion was based on their traces. The chairman should have no traces of the PNI Asu faction, and the position was requested not to be held by a "Soekarnoist". Based on this criterion, Suryadi's trace was cleaner that Soebagyo and therefore, he was chosen as the chairman of PDI. He was officially installed as the chairman of 2 May 1986.

=== Controversy ===
His rise to the chairman seat of the Indonesian Democratic Party after being chosen by the Ministry of Home Affairs was controversial. Suryadi was not popular in the party, and rumor spread that Suryadi had only received his membership card ten days before the third congress of the party. His age also became a problem. He wasn't liked by the old school members of the party. Several reasons of unlikeness, such as the closeness to the government, the party's management, and the consensus principles which was not fully enacted by Suryadi's Central Executive Committee.

== Personal life ==
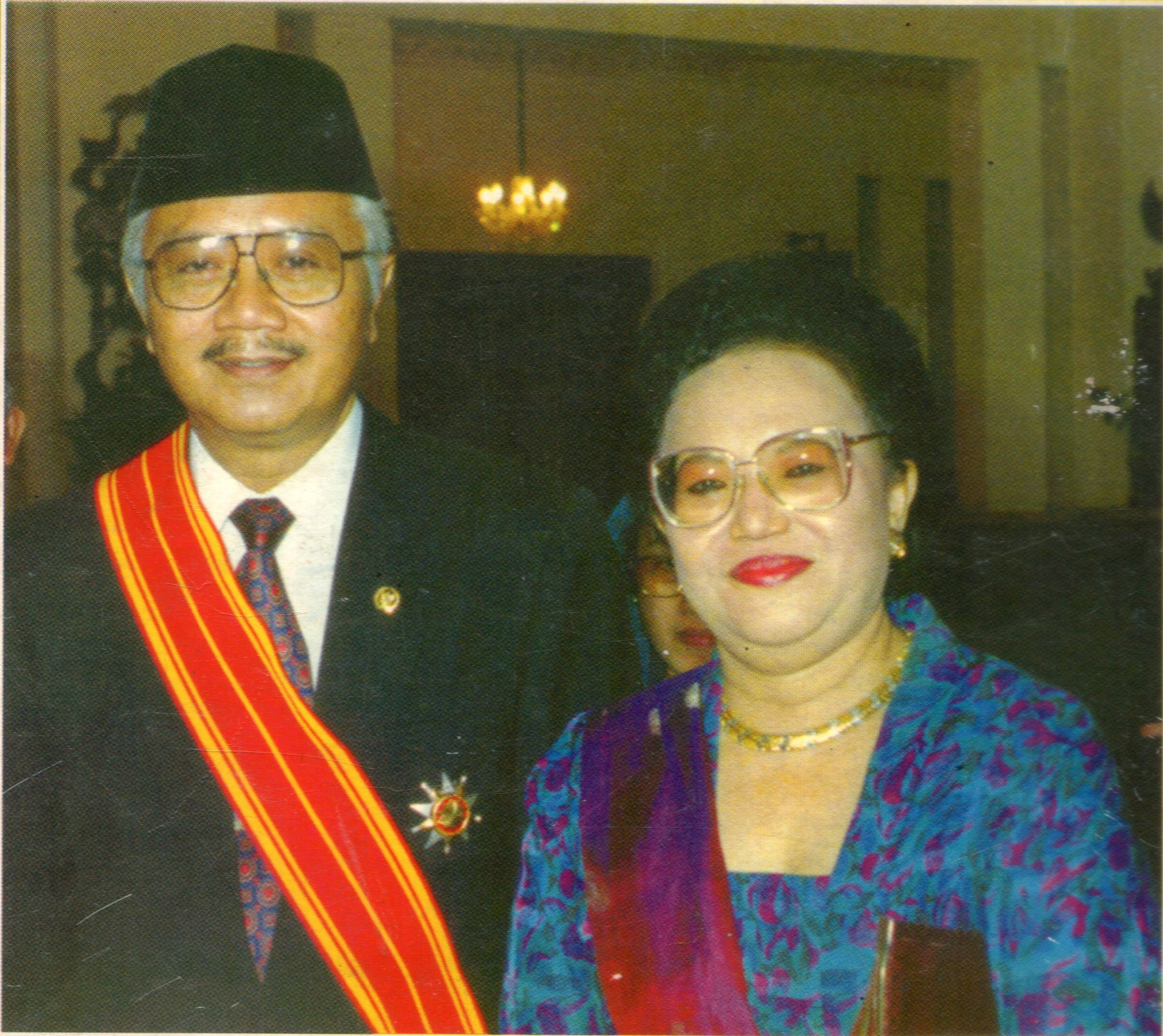
Suryadi and Sri Hartati Wulandari.

Suryadi was married to Sri Hartati Wulandari. Wulandari was the daughter of a prominent PNI figure, Hadisubeno Sosrowerdojo, which was the 6th Governor of Central Java. He met her during his time as the chairman of GMNI, while Wulandari was the treasurer. They dated for two years since 1967, until they were married on 15 January 1969. Their marriage resulted in three children.

During his seat as the chairman of PDI, Wulandari was put as the Vice Chairman of the Woman's Section of PDI. Suryadi always brought Wulandari wherever he go during his trip to the regions, in order to protect himself from false gossips.
