= 1982 Indonesian legislative election =

- 4 May 1982

360 of the 460 seats in the House of Representatives 181 seats needed for a majority
- Registered: 81,629,250
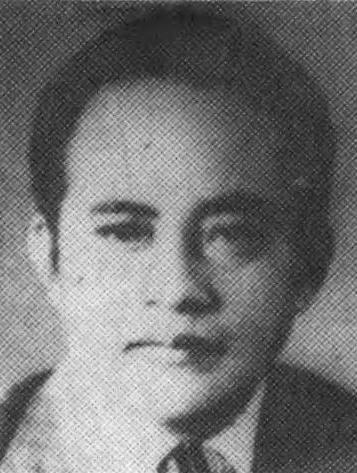

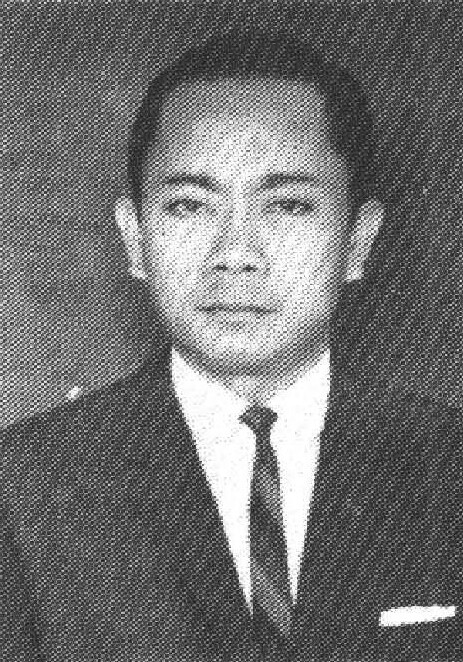

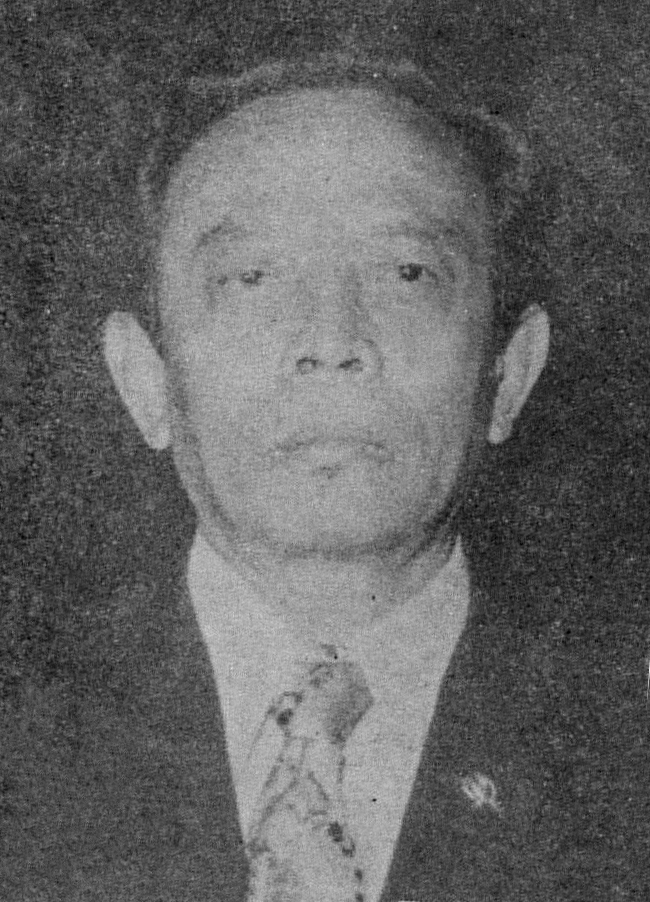
	First party	Second party	Third party
Leader	Amir Murtono	Jailani Naro	Sunawar Sukowati
Party	Golkar	PPP	PDI
Last election	62.11%, 232 seats	29.29%, 99 seats	8.60%, 29 seats
Seats won	242	94	24
Seat change	▲10	▼5	▼5
Popular vote	48,334,724	20,871,880	5,919,702
Percentage	64.34%	27.78%	7.88%
Swing	▲2.23pp	▼1.51pp	▼0.72pp
- Golkar PPP
Speaker before election
Daryatmo
Golkar
Elected Speaker
Amir Machmud
Golkar

Legislative elections were held in Indonesia on 4 May 1982. They were the fourth legislative elections since independence and the third under the New Order regime There were three participants; the two political parties, the United Development Party (PPP), the Indonesian Democratic Party (PDI) and the "functional group" Golkar. As with all elections during the New Order regime, the government-backed Golkar organization won an absolute majority.

== Background ==
Following the 1978 re-election of President Suharto by the People's Consultative Assembly a year after the victory of the government political vehicle Golkar in the legislative election, the government started to make preparations for the next five-yearly vote by submitting a revised election law to the legislature. Among the changes discussed were the symbols used by the parties. The government's proposed law included a provision banning party symbols that "might generate conflict affecting the unity and integrity of the nation". At the time, the Islamic United Development Party symbol was the Kaaba, while the Indonesian Democratic Party used a symbol similar to the National emblem of Indonesia. Both parties wanted to retain their symbols. Both parties also wanted a reduction in the number of seats awarded by government nominees to be reduced from 100 to 75. Ultimately the bill was passed, with no changes to party logos or the number of appointed legislative members. However, an additional four seats, on top of the 360 elected seats, were allocated to the new province of East Timor following its annexation, and these were taken from the non-military appointed seats.

== Campaign ==
The official election campaign lasted from 15 March to 27 April, followed by a "quiet week" before polling day on 4 May. As in 1977, the government used a variety of tactics to ensure a victory for Golkar. As well as shortening the campaign period by 15 days, the government regulation on the election required all contestants to submit campaign plans a week in advance, allowed regional governments to ban campaign activities seen as potentially disrupting public order and gave the government the power to reject electoral candidates, which it did to the detriment of the two parties. The government also pressured civil servants not only to vote Golkar, but also to persuade family members and friends to do so, while the army provided support for Golkar in the form of its campaign to enter villages to ensure people in rural areas gave their support.

There were a number of violent incidents during the campaign, and two news publications, including the weekly news magazine Tempo were banned for reporting on them. In the most serious incident, on 18 March, clashes between PPP and Golkar supporters at a Golkar rally on Jakarta's Lapangan Banteng led to rioting and arson. The Golkar stage was set alight and 318 people were arrested. There was also campaign violence in Yogyakarta and Solo.

== Results ==
Once again Golkar won an absolute majority, with over 64% of the vote, beating its performance in both previous elections, while both political parties saw their vote fall. Golkar won a majority of votes in all provinces except Aceh, and including the four seats in won in East Timor, its directly elected seat total increased by 14 when the results were announced on 14 June. The two parties each lost five seats.

Party	Votes	%	Seats	+/–
Golkar	48,334,724	64.34	242	+10
United Development Party	20,871,880	27.78	94	–5
Indonesian Democratic Party	5,919,702	7.88	24	–5
Appointed members			100	0
Total	75,126,306	100.00	460	0
Registered voters/turnout	81,629,250	–		
Source: Sulastri, Sudibjo

== Presidential election ==
Following the legislative election the People's Consultative Assembly (MPR), the legislative branch of Indonesia, met from 10 to 11 March 1983 to elect both the president and vice president of the country for the 1988–1993 term. In the 1982 legislative election, abstentions increased in number. The number of abstentions had been increasing since the campaign began in the 1970s. The government spread a campaign to stop these abstentions.

However, this campaign became chaotic after an incident at Lapangan Banteng, Central Jakarta. Nevertheless, this incident did not defeat Golkar in the election. Golkar still won a landslide victory and received many votes. On 10 March, Suharto was thus re-elected president unanimously to a fourth term at the 1982 MPR General Session. Umar Wirahadikusumah, an army general, was subsequently elected vice president on the next day.
