= 1997 Indonesian legislative election =

- 29 May 1997

425 of the 500 seats in the House of Representatives 213 seats needed for a majority
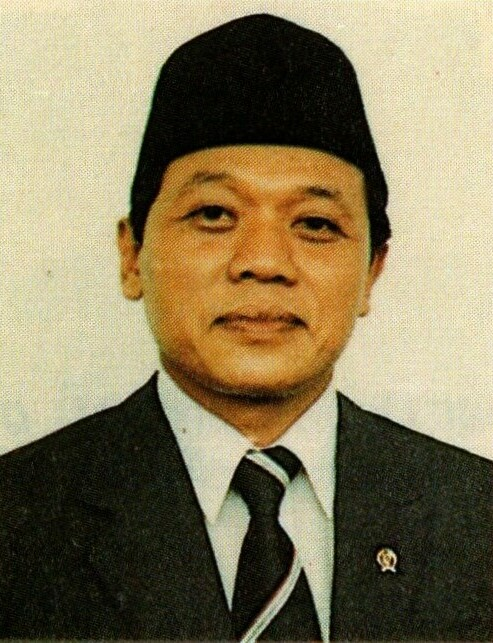

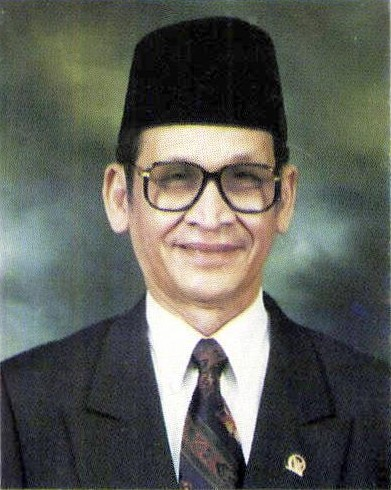

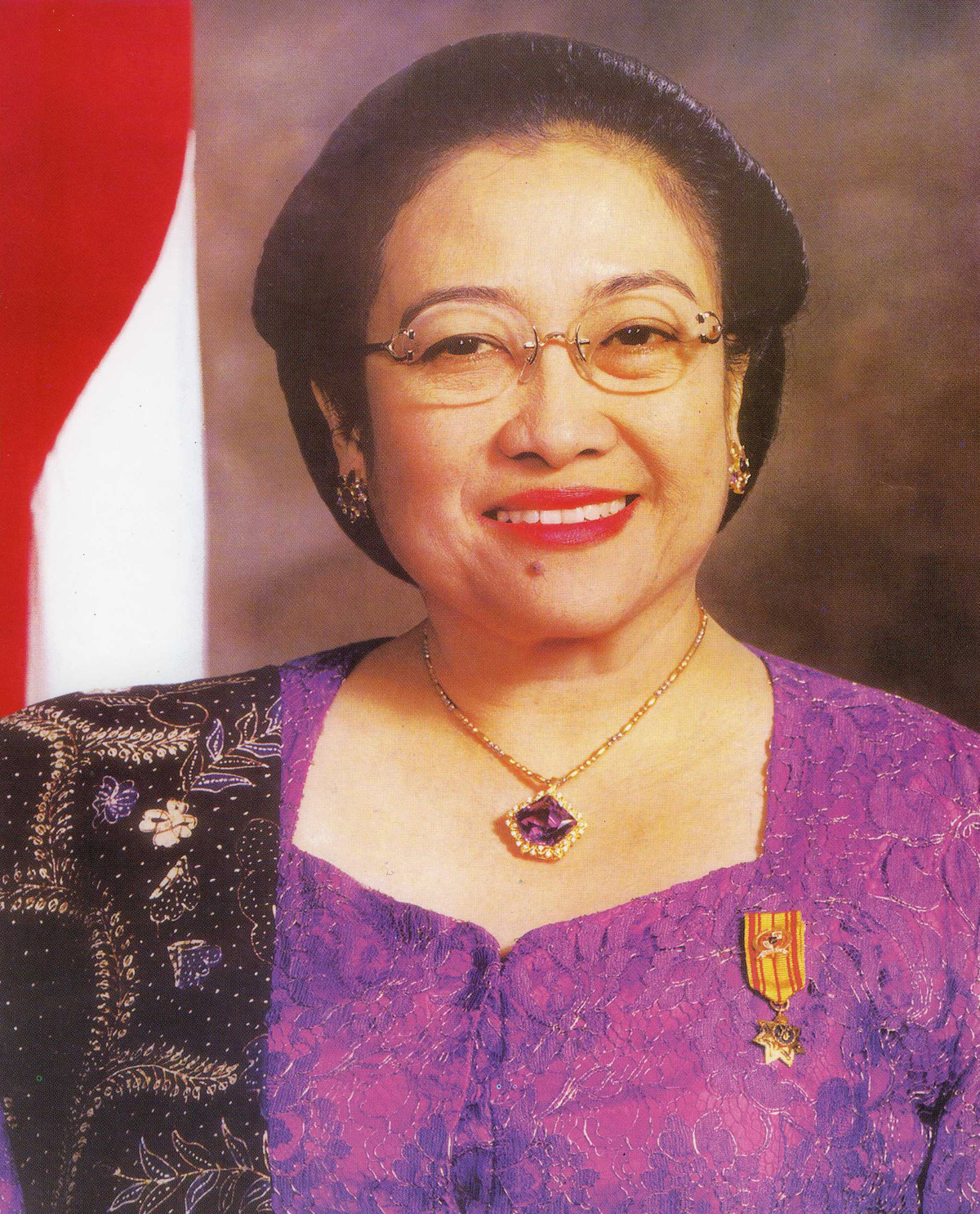
	First party	Second party	Third party
Leader	Harmoko	Ismail Hasan Metareum	Megawati Sukarnoputri (Note: Even though Suryadi is regarded as the chairperson of the party in 1997, the documents regarding to the general elections in 1996 was signed by Megawati. In a photograph during the drawing of ballot numbers of the general elections participants, Megawati can be seen standing alongside Harmoko and Ismail Hasan Metareum, the other two chairman.)
Party	Golkar	PPP	PDI
Last election	68.10%, 282 seats	17.00%, 62 seats	14.89%, 56 seats
Seats won	325	89	11
Seat change	▲43	▲27	▼45
Popular vote	84,187,907	25,340,028	3,463,225
Percentage	74.51%	22.43%	3.06%
Swing	▲6.41pp	▲5.43pp	▼11.83pp
- Results by electoral district
Speaker before election
Wahono
Golkar
Elected Speaker
Harmoko
Golkar

Legislative elections were held in Indonesia on 29 May 1997. There were three simultaneous elections in one because voters were electing members of two levels of regional government (provincial and regency levels) as well as the national-level People's Representative Council. This was the last election of President Suharto's New Order regime, which collapsed one year later. Like the preceding New Order elections, it was won outright by the Golkar organization.

== Background ==
The political and social environment during the 1997 legislative elections was substantially different than in previous elections. There was a widespread belief among public that this election would be Suharto's last term as president. However, there was no clear successor to him or his New Order regime.

This led to many officials in the government demonstrating their loyalty to Suharto and to gain his favor by delivering a victory for Golkar. This led to what professor of politics and government at Gadjah Mada University, Cornelis Lay called "a shattering process of structural cheating."

Another factor in the election was the greater global focus on human rights in Indonesia. In 1993, pressure against the Suharto government resulted in formation of the National Commission on Human Rights. The commission, which had an unusual degree of independence from the Suharto government, offered a channel for humans rights groups and organizations to focus international attention to human rights abuses in the country.

== Participants ==
Indonesian law at that time only allowed three organizations to participate in elections – the United Development Party (PPP), the Indonesian Democratic Party (PDI) and Golkar (functional group), an organization which started off as a confederation of NGOs, and was officially not a party.

== Election campaign ==
The 27-day campaign ran from April 27 to May 23, with a quiet period of five days before polling day.

=== Media coverage ===
The mass media tended to favor "a particular election participant", for example Suara Karya newspaper only reported on Golkar campaign activities and did not mention the PDI or PPP campaigns at all. On the other hand, the daily Media Indonesia was rather more balanced, but overall, Golkar campaign speakers received far more coverage.

In the later stages of the campaign, media coverage was dominated by reports of campaign violence. Suara Karya in particular reported three times as many violent incidents involving the PPP than any other paper.

=== Campaign issues ===
None of the election participants started the campaign by announcing or focusing on its main themes, therefore the public really had no idea what they were offering. The campaign was dominated by "sloganistic issues" with very little substance. For example, all three election participants promised to address problems such as poverty and corruption, but none actually said how to achieve this. In fact, Kristiadi sayd that the only difference between this campaign and the previous one in 1992 was that there was less use of Koran verses to try to attract support.

=== The "Mega-Bintang Phenomenon" ===
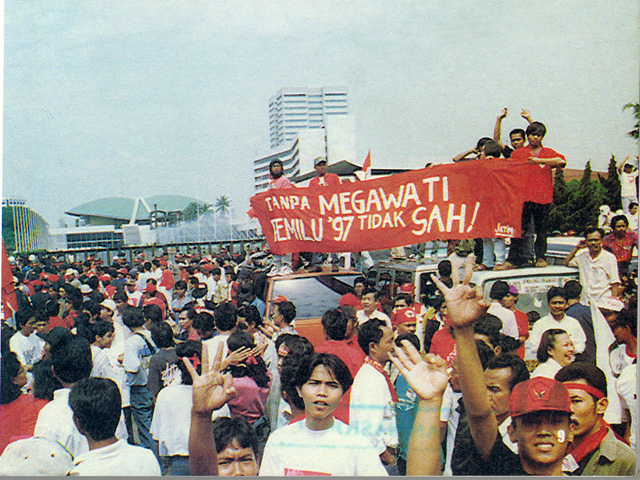
Indonesian Democratic Party supporters rally in front of the DPR in support of Megawati Sukarnoputri

Following the government's forced replacement of PDI leader Megawati Sukarnoputri by Soeryadi at the party's 1996 Medan conference, the PDI tried hard to put forward an independent image. Meanwhile, many of Megawati's supporters gravitated towards the PPP, in a phenomenon known as the "Mega-Bintang" coalition. Bintang means "star", and was the symbol of the PPP. This was an entirely unexpected occurrence. Megawati was seen as representing secular politics, while the PPP was an Islamic party, but the two found common ground as a coalition of the oppressed.

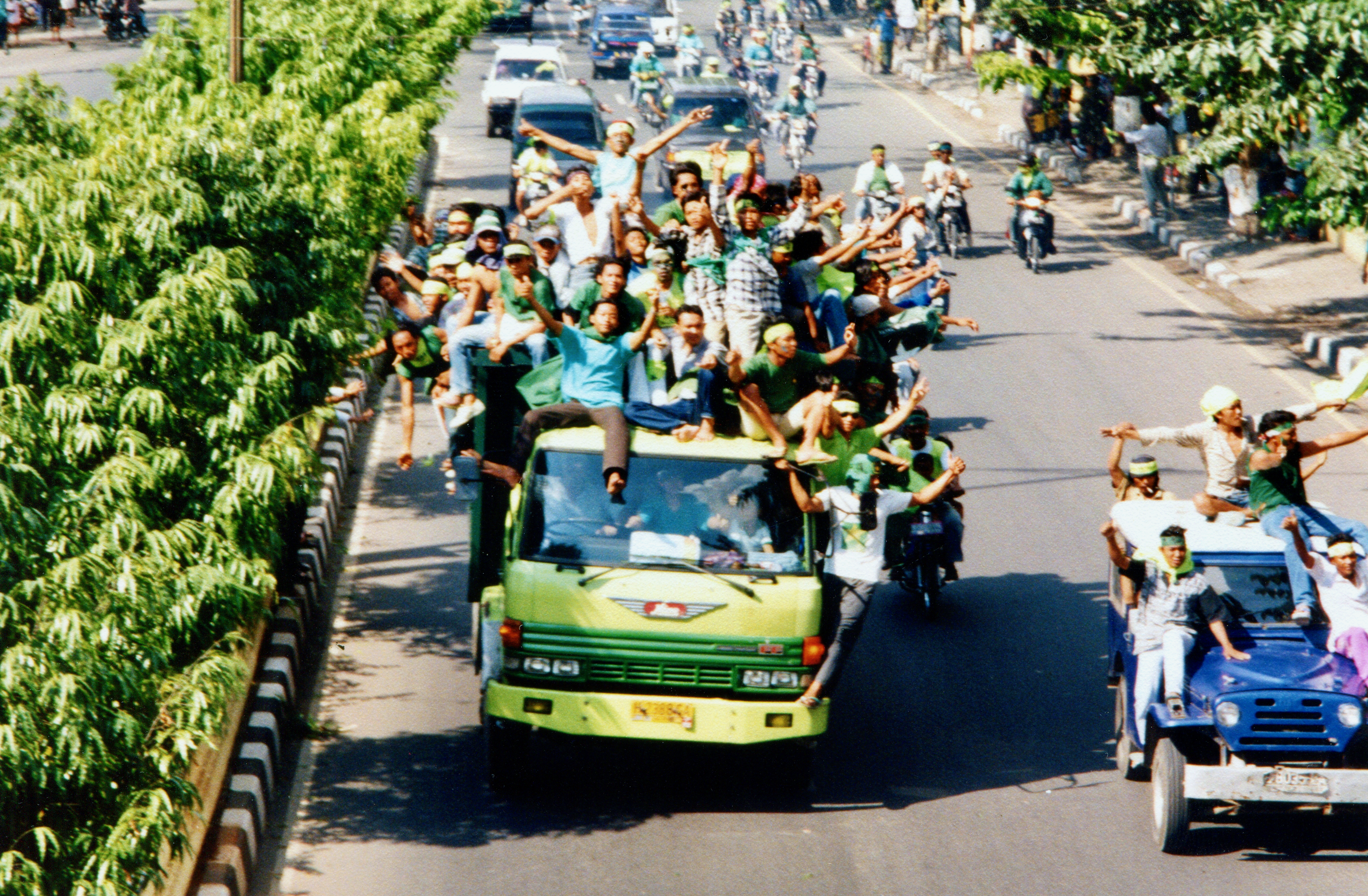
United Development Party campaigners in Semarang

PPP officials explicitly rejected the term "coalition", and said the increase in their support was a symbol of the revival of their party. However, posters and symbols carried by Megawati supporters made clear what the "Mega-Bintang" coalition really meant. The government then banned the use of "Mega-Bintang" posters and symbols, saying it was contrary to election regulation. This ban was used by the security forces as an excuse to remove all such symbols.

=== Campaign participants ===
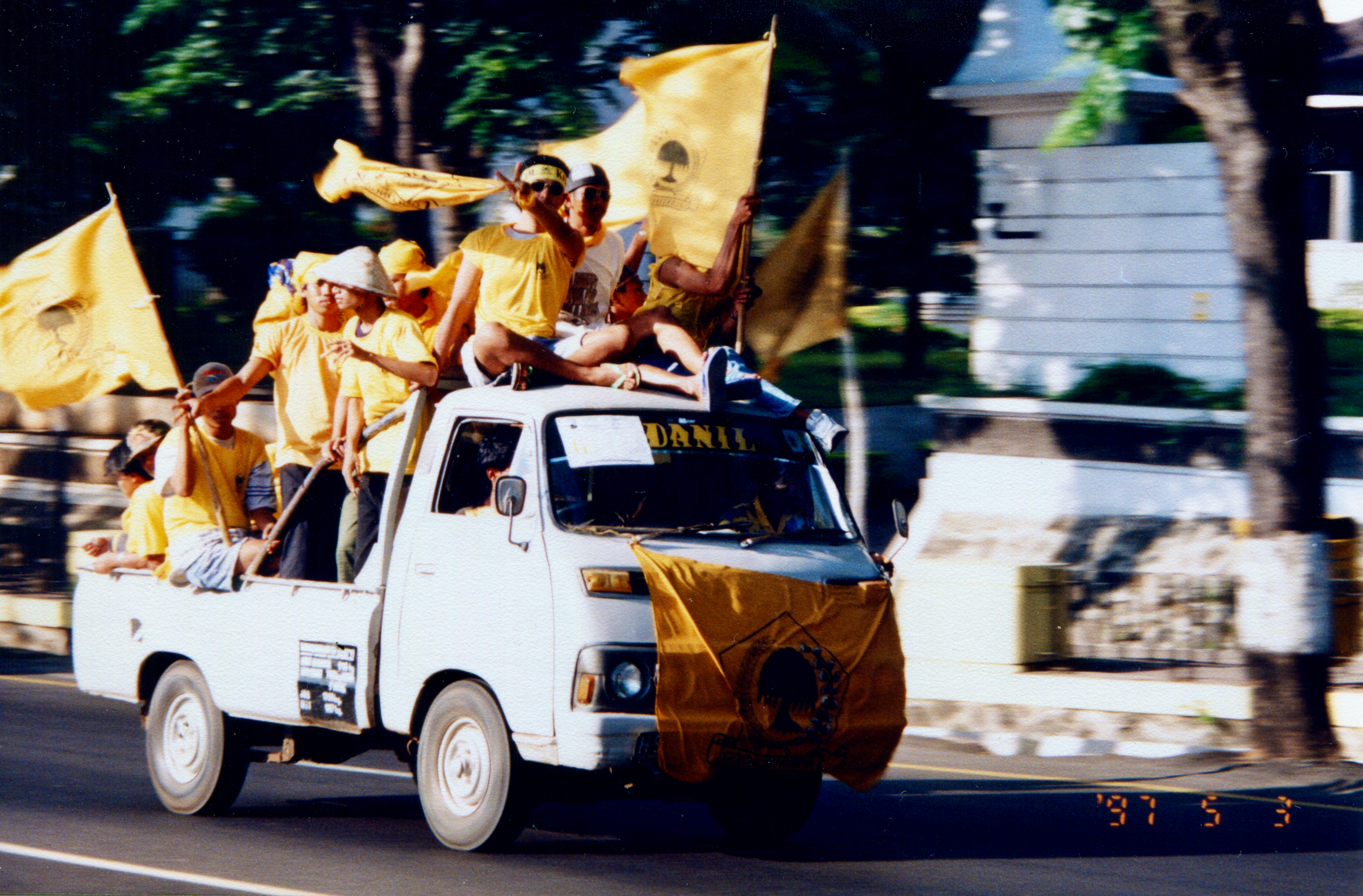
Golkar supporters in Semarang, May 1997

According to Kristiadi, there were three types of people who took part in the campaigns:

- People ordered to do so or who were after money, or who wanted to see the entertainers laid on at rallies
- People who voluntarily attended because they were proud to support their organization
- Young people releasing energy

More than 200 people died during the course of the campaign, mostly in road traffic accidents and through being trapped in burning buildings during the disturbances in Banjarmasin.

=== Intimidation and other irregularities ===
There were reports in the press of intimidation and "buying support", for example pressure on teachers to urge older high school students (the minimum voting age was 18) to vote for "a particular election participant" with a 'reward' for compliance and 'punishment' for failure. There were also other reports of known PPP and PDI supporters being intimidated.

There were also disputes between employees, who wanted voters to cast their ballots at their places of work, and local government officials, who wanted them to vote near their homes, as each wanted to ensure they met their responsibility to achieve their quota of Golkar votes.

== Results ==
While Golkar won 282 seats in the MPR, the PDI lost 45 (winning 56 seats) while the PPP, thanks in part to the pro-Megawati PDI wing support, won 62 seats, an increase of 27, becoming the leading opposition party in the Assembly.

Party	Votes	%	Seats	+/–
Golkar	84,187,907	74.51	325	+43
United Development Party	25,340,028	22.43	89	+27
Indonesian Democratic Party	3,463,225	3.07	11	–45
Appointed members			75	–25
Total	112,991,160	100.00	500	0
Registered voters/turnout	124,740,987	–		
Source: Nohlen et al.

=== By province ===
Province	PPP		Golkar		PDI	
Province	Votes	%	Votes	%	Votes	%
Aceh	668,802	31.86	1,360,379	64.81	69,993	3.33
North Sumatra	742,958	12.84	4,648,928	80.33	395,583	6.84
West Sumatra	188,168	7.74%	2,214,666	91.15	26,958	1.11
Riau	313,013	13.77	1,879,977	82.70	80,232	3.53
Jambi	76,964	5.90%	1,208,090	92.58	19,889	1.52
South Sumatra	446,792	11.30	3,361,164	84.98	147,131	3.72
Bengkulu	30,344	3.85	747,140	94.77	10,903	1.38
Lampung	177,244	4.82	3,424,949	93.21	72,156	1.96
Jakarta	2,239,418	32.87	4,451,503	65.34	121,931	1.79
West Java	6,003,471	25.99	16,709,824	72.34	386,938	1.68
Central Java	4,961,280	29.01	11,671,667	68.26	466,840	2.73
Yogyakarta	602,739	34.22	1,102,256	62.58	56,487	3.21
East Java	6,791,399	33.89	12,620,089	62.97	630,708	3.15
Bali	60,779	3.28	1,727,810	93.21	65,044	3.51%
West Nusa Tenggara	268,022	14.56	1,484,697	80.66	87,913	4.78
East Nusa Tenggara	29,667	1.51	1,867,339	94.94	69,880	3.55
East Timor	7,188	1.82%	334,718	84.70	53,296	13.49
West Kalimantan	281,992	15.14	1,298,746	69.72	282,035	15.14
Central Kalimantan	95,736	9.83	843,065	86.60	34,717	3.57
South Kalimantan	406,719	25.15	1,164,085	71.98	46,471	2.87
East Kalimantan	272,961	23.66	807,678	70.02	72,902	6.32
North Sulawesi	42,018	2.44	1,648,075	95.90	28,521	1.66
Central Sulawesi	114,748	10.39	937,551	84.89	52,175	4.72
South Sulawesi	322,308	7.34	4,023,937	91.63	45,377	1.03
Southeast Sulawesi	17,498	2.07	822,163	97.22	6,033	0.71
Maluku	140,604	12.98	888,948	82.07	53,637	4.95
Irian Jaya	38,196	3.62	938,463	88.86	79,476	7.53
TOTALS	25,340,028	22.43	84,187,907	74.51	3,463,225	3.06
Source: Kristiadi et al.

== Presidential election ==
Following the legislative election, the People's Consultative Assembly (MPR), the legislative branch of Indonesia, met from 10 to 11 March 1998 to elect both the president and vice president of the country for the 1998–2003 term. On 10 March, Suharto was re-elected president unanimously to a seventh term. B. J. Habibie, Suharto's state minister of research and technology, was subsequently elected vice president on the next day. Despite the election, which took place during the height of the 1998 financial crisis, Suharto was forced to resign that May, just two months into what was to have been a five-year term.
