= Indonesian Democratic Vanguard Party =

Indonesian Democratic Vanguard Party Partai Penegak Demokrasi Indonesia
- Abbreviation: PPDI
- Chairman: Mentik Budiwiyono
- Secretary-General: Joseph William Lea Wea
- Founded: 10 January 2003 (as Indonesian Democratic Vanguard Party); 28 November 2020 (as People's Democratic Party of Indonesia)
- Dissolved: 10 March 2013
- Preceded by: Indonesian Democratic Party
- Merged into: People's Conscience Party
- Succeeded by: People's Democratic Party of Indonesia
- Headquarters: Jakarta
- Ideology: Pancasila; Indonesian nationalism Marhaenism; Left-wing populism
- Political position: Centre-left to left-wing

The Indonesian Democratic Vanguard Party (Indonesian: Partai Penegak Demokrasi Indonesia, PPDI), now known as the Indonesian People's Democratic Party (Indonesian: Partai Demokrasi Rakyat Indonesia, PDRI), was a political party in Indonesia. It was a continuation of the Indonesian Democratic Party (PDI), one of the two state-approved parties during the New Order. After the PDI failed to achieve enough votes in the 1999 legislative elections to qualify for the 2004 elections, it changed its name to the Indonesian Democratic Vanguard Party (PDI Party). In 2004 it won one seat. The party contested the 2009 legislative election, but won only 0.13 percent of the vote, less than the 2.5 percent electoral threshold, thereby losing its only seat in the People's Representative Council. Following its poor result in the 2009 vote, the party joined nine other smaller parties to form the National Unity Party (Indonesian: Partai Persatuan Nasional). The party also attempted to contest the 2014 elections, but failed to fulfill the criteria set by the General Elections Commission, and along with nine other parties who also failed to qualify, decided to merge into the People's Conscience Party (Hanura).

== Election results ==
=== Presidential election results ===
Election	Ballot number	Candidate	Running mate	1st round (Total votes)	Share of votes	Outcome	2nd round (Total votes)	Share of votes	Outcome
2004	3	Amien Rais	Siswono Yudo Husodo	17,392,931	14.66%	Eliminated	Lost		
2009	2	Susilo Bambang Yudhoyono	Boediono	70,997,833	53.15%	Elected			

=== Legislative election results ===
Election	Ballot number	Leader	Seats		Total votes	Share of votes	Outcome of election
Election	Ballot number	Leader	No.	±	Total votes	Share of votes	Outcome of election
2004	11	Dimyati Hartono	0 / 550		85,811	0.75%	Opposition
2009	19	Endung Soetrisno	0 / 560	0	139,988	0.13%	Governing coalition
