= 1st Congress of the Indonesian Democratic Party =

April 12, 1976 – April 13, 1976	2nd →
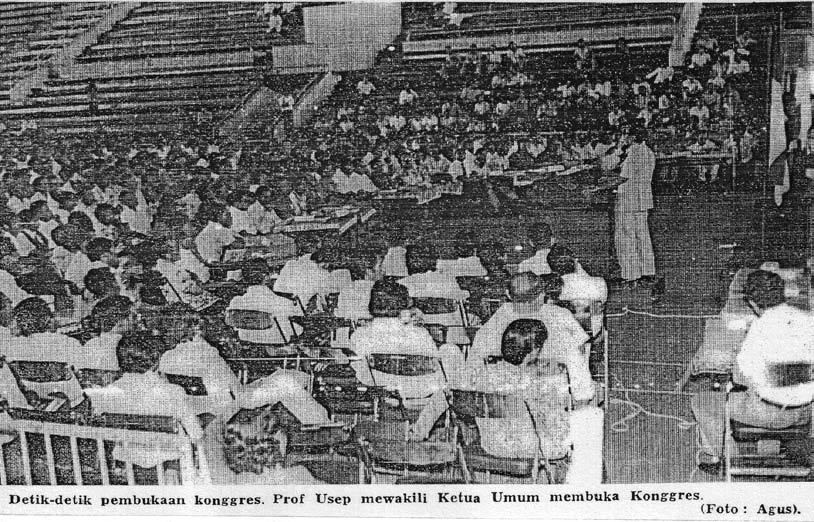
- Opening of the congress
- Host country: Indonesia
- Venue(s): Istora Gelora Bung Karno
- Cities: Jakarta
- Chair: Sanusi Harjadinata

The First Congress of the Indonesian Democratic Party (Indonesian: Kongres I Partai Demokrasi Indonesia (PDI)) was held between 12 – 13 April 1976. The congress was the first meeting of any political party after the 1971 general elections, which is the first election after the New Order. Therefore, the congress was also deemed important by the elements inside the party to The congress ratified the Charter of Struggle, official program of the party, and the statutes and bylaws of the party. The congress also enacted decisions in relation with elections and other political matters.

The congress was opened by the speech of President Suharto on 12 March 1976, at the Istora Gelora Bung Karno. The congress was attended by around 1500 members, representing 260 branches and 26 provinces, the Central Executive Council, and the Central Advisory Council.

== Background ==
The need to hold the congress was mandated through the article 28 of the temporary party's constitution, that stated that "In the shortest possible time ... the PDI must hold the first congress to confirm: the Charter of Struggle, the party's constitution, the Party Struggle Program, and ratify and perfect the PDI apparatus". The congress was a respond to the de jure fusion of the political party after the declaration, a problem that continually haunts the party. The fused political party in PDI runs the party on the basis of factionalism, and thus such mechanism slowly replaced the original mechanism of the party.

The formation of party's branches is also a major problem. Even though PDI is able to create a provincial branch all over Indonesia in six months since its formation, the party struggled to create a district branch. The opposition given by the local bureaucracy elites in several regencies made further efforts futile. To cope this problem, PDI used the help of Ministry of Internal Affairs. The ministry would order the governor and regents to help the formation of district branches of PDI. The help by the ministry proved useful, and prior to the first congress, a total of 257 district branches of the party had been built all over Indonesia. Even though the branch formation was delayed in South and West Sumatra due to the ban of government employees participating in political parties, the overall help went smoothly.

== Congress ==
Prior to the congress in Monday, each provincial and district branch sent their own group, consisting of five delegates. The delegations self-funded their trip from their region, while the accommodation and the meal was covered by the congress committee.
