= Sunawar Sukowati =

Indonesian politician (1922–1986)

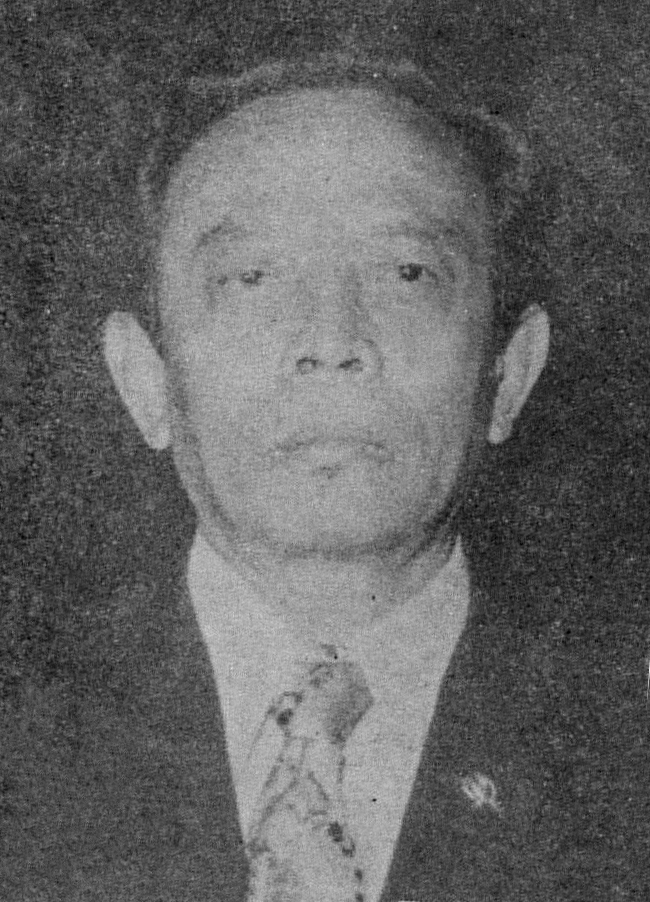
- Official portrait, c. 1973

3rd Chairman of the Indonesian Democratic Party
- In office 16 October 1980 – 12 January 1986
- Preceded by: Sanusi Hardjadinata
- Succeeded by: Suryadi

4th Minister of State for People's Welfare
- In office 28 March 1973 – 31 March 1978
- President: Suharto
- Preceded by: Idham Chalid
- Succeeded by: Surono Reksodimedjo

11th Minister of National Development
- In office 10 June 1968 – 9 September 1971
- President: Suharto
- Preceded by: Ruslan Abdulgani
- Succeeded by: Widjojo Nitisastro

Personal details
- Born: Sunawar Sukowati; 6 September 1922 Surakarta, Dutch East Indies
- Died: 12 January 1986 (aged 63) Bandung, Indonesia
- Party: PDI (1973–1986)
- Other political affiliations: PNI (1946–1973)

Sunawar Sukowati (EVO: Soenawar Soekawati; 6 September 1922 – 12 January 1986) was an Indonesian politician from Central Java, who served as the third chairman of the Indonesian Democratic Party from 1980 until 1986. Prior to serving as party chairman, he served as minister of State for People's Welfare and minister of National Development.

== Biography ==
According to Sunawar Sukowati in 1983:

The Republic of Indonesia does not mix constitutional issues with religious issues. Therefore, in a country with Pancasila philosophy, no one should be allergic to call that the Republic of Indonesia adheres to the ideology of secularism. The notion of secularism that separates religious matters from state matters can be found in Soeharto's presidential speech. The head of state explicitly stated that Pancasila is not a religion. For this, the Indonesian Democratic Party must have the courage to assert that the Republic of Indonesia is a 'Secular State'!

In 1983, he sparked latent controversy by informing his colleagues in the Indonesian Democratic Party faction that the Pancasila state, as mentioned in Suharto's presidential speech, is a secular state. He argues that this view is inferred from the fact that Indonesia is not a religious state, and religious authority is separated from state authority. His opinion was approved by K.H Hasbullah Bakry and Abdurrahman Wahid.

== Sources ==
- Lay, Cornelis (2010). Parlindungan, Utan (ed.). Melawan negara: PDI 1973-1986 [Against the state: PDI 1973-1986] (in Indonesian). Yogyakarta: Gadjah Mada University. ISBN 9786029676204.
