= Supreme Advisory Council =

Defunct Indonesian Advisory Council

- Dewan Pertimbangan Agung
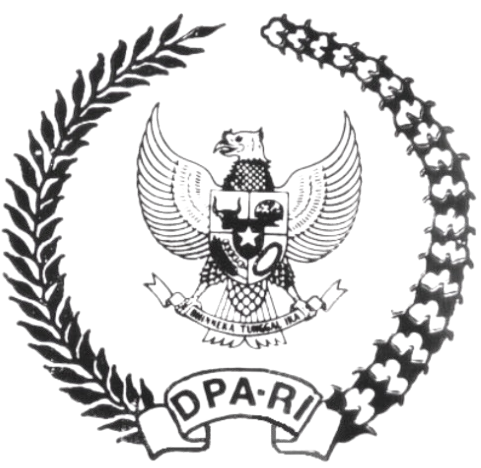
- Seal of the Supreme Advisory Council

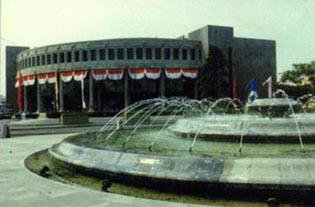
- Office of the council, 2000

Agency overview
- Formed: 25 September 1945
- Dissolved: 31 July 2003; 23 years ago
- Superseding agency: Presidential Advisory Council
- Website: Official website

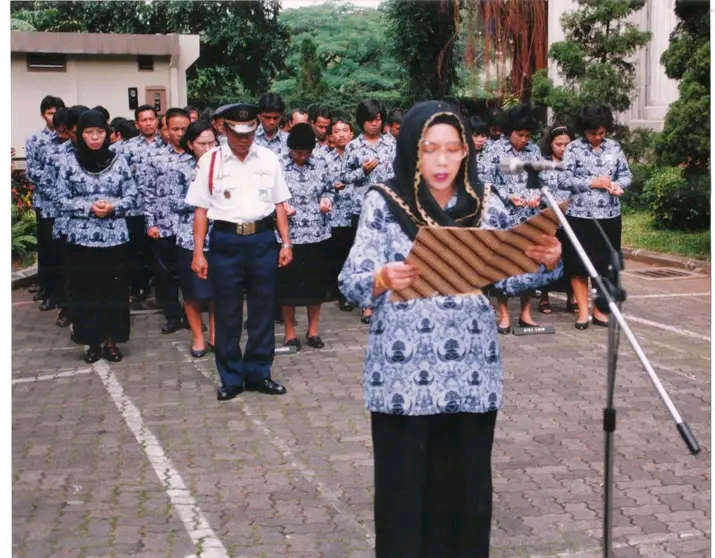
Ceremony at Supreme Advisory Council

The Supreme Advisory Council (Indonesian: Dewan Pertimbangan Agung, DPA), was an advisory council for the President of Indonesia which existed from 1945 to 1950, and then again from 1959 to 2003. It was largely composed of senior and retired government figures. Its functions were limited to offering proposals to the government on matters of national importance as well as opinions on matters raised by the president. The DPA was succeeded by the Presidential Advisory Council in 2007.

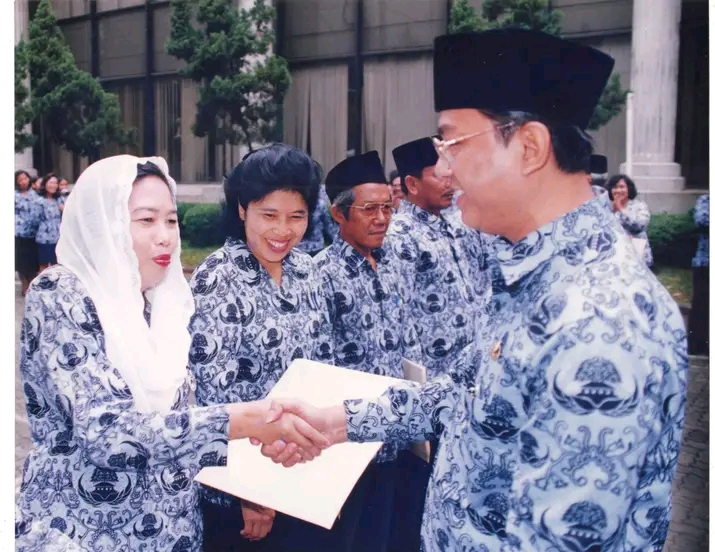
Supreme Advisory Council Employees and executives

== Background ==
There was no definitive source about the background of the council's formation when it was embodied in the Constitution of Indonesia. In the supplement of the constitution, the council was compared to a council of state, leading to possibility that the council was based on the Council of the Indies in the Dutch East Indies. In the founding fathers of Indonesia itself, there was an opinion that the council was based on the village traditions in Indonesia, on which the villagers decided matters and resolve conflict with a "council of elders". This "council of elders" was in par with the Supreme Advisory Council, which was composed of retired politicians.

== History ==
The council was established one month and one week following the proclamation of Indonesian Independence. When it was first established on September 25, 1945. The name for the council was Advisory Council, which was suggested by Mohammad Yamin. The name was approved by Sukarno. However, several months later, the name was changed to the Supreme Advisory Body. It was later changed again into the Supreme Advisory Council. The Supreme Advisory Council was formed with the announcement of the formation of the council in the Official Gazette No. 4 of 1945. Due to the emergency situation of the country, the council was not formed with a binding law. The priority at that time was to form a temporary advisory council as soon as possible under the Constitution of Indonesia. The council was formed on 25 September 1945 with Margono Djojohadikusumo as its chairman and Radjiman Wediodiningrat, Syech Dahlan Djambek, Agus Salim, K.R.M.T.H. Wurjaningrat, H. Adnan, Mochammad Enoch, Dr. Latumeten, Pangeran Mochammad Noor, Sukiman Wirjosandjojo, Nyonya Soewarni Pringgodigdo, as its members.

Several months after its formation, on 6 November 1945, chairman of the council Margono resigned from his position. He was replaced by Wiranatakusumah on 29 November 1945. Later, in 1948, there was an addition of eleven members to the council, namely Ario Soerjo, Sutardjo Kartohadikusumo, Abdul Wahab Hasbullah, Ki Hadjar Dewantara, Frits Laoh, Daud Beureu'eh, Anwarudin, Oerip Soemohardjo, Ernest Douwes Dekker, Moch. Sjafei, and Liem Ing Hwie. On 24 April 1948, Wiranatakusumah was installed as the Wali Negara of Pasundan. Ario Soerjo replaced him as the chairman, but several days later he was assassinated on 10 November 1948. To replace him, the vice chairman of the council Sutardjo Kartohadikusumo was installed on 15 November 1948. Ki Hadjar Dewantara was later appointed as vice chairman of the council. During the liberal democracy period in Indonesia, the organization was dissolved in 1950, and was restructured into the National Council (Indonesian: Dewan Nasional) on 1957. The National Council was dissolved in 1959, and formed the Provisional Supreme Advisory Council, with Sukarno, the president of Indonesia, as its chairman.

After the fall of Sukarno, the council was restored as a structural organization in 1967. It was dissolved on 31 July 2003 after the amendments to the Constitution of Indonesia. The functions of the council, which is previously regulated in the section IV of the constitution, was removed. Professor Harun Al-Rasjid from the Law Faculty of the University of Indonesia, a critic of the operations of the council, dubbed the DPA as the Dewan Paling Anteng (Most Serene Council). Rasjid stated that the result of the Supreme Advisory Council was unknown by the public and that its existence should be reviewed.

== Potential Revival and Return ==
Despite its constitutional basis revoked from constitution, DPA plotted to be revived in future Prabowo administration. Even being returned, future DPA only nomenclature change of current Presidential Advisory Council (Wantimpres) and do not have its original power it had during pre-amendment Indonesian Constitution of 1945. The bill for returning DPA was accepted to be processed into next reading and discussion by the DPR on 11 July 2024.

== List of chairmen ==
No.	Portrait	Name (Birth–Death)	Term	Deputy
1	Official portrait of Margono Djojohadikusumo	Margono Djojohadikusumo (1894–1978)	25 September 1945 – 6 November 1945	Agus Salim
2	Official portrait of Wiranatakusumah V	Wiranatakusumah V (1888–1965)	29 November 1945 – 24 April 1948	Agus Salim (1945–1946) Soekiman Wirjosandjojo (1946–1948) Ario Soerjo (1948)
3	Portrait of Ario Soerjo	Ario Soerjo (1898–1948)	24 April 1948 – 10 November 1948	Sutardjo Kartohadikusumo
4	Official portrait of Sutardjo Kartohadikusumo	Sutardjo Kartohadikusumo (1890–1976)	10 November 1948 – 17 August 1950	Vacant
Body dissolved (1950–1959)
5	Official portrait of Sukarno	Sukarno (1901–1970)	22 July 1959 – 23 April 1966	Roeslan Abdulgani (1959–1962) Sartono (1962–1966) Sujono Hadinoto (1964–1966)
–	Portrait of Johannes Leimena	Johannes Leimena (1905–1977)	23 April 1966 – 4 March 1968	Sartono
–	Official portrait of Muhammad Dahlan	Muhammad Dahlan (1909–1977)	23 April 1966 – 4 March 1968	Sartono
6	Official portrait of Wilopo	Wilopo (1909–1981)	4 March 1968 – 31 March 1978	Muhammad Ilyas (1968–1970) Sarbini Martodihardjo (1973–1977) Alamsyah Ratu Perwiranegara (1977–1978)
7	Official portrait of Idham Chalid	Idham Chalid (1921–2010)	31 March 1978 – 19 March 1983	Sunawar Sukowati; R. Soedjono; Jailani Naro (1978–1983) M. M. R. Kartakusuma (1978–1979) Djatikoesoemo (1979–1983)
8	Official portrait of Maraden Panggabean	Maraden Panggabean (1922–2000)	19 March 1983 – 23 March 1988	Jailani Naro; Sapardjo (1983–1988) Ali Murtopo (1983–1984) Makmun Murod (1984–1988) Sunawar Sukowati (1983–1986) Wignyosumarsono (1986–1988)
9	Official portrait of Sudomo	Sudomo (1926–2012)	23 March 1988 – 16 March 1998	Makmun Murod; Hartono Mardjono; Ben Mang Reng Say; Sugandhi (1988–1993) Sugiarto; Suhardiman; Imam Kadri; Cholil Badawi (1993–1998)
10	Official portrait of A. A. Baramuli	A. A. Baramuli (1930–2006)	16 March 1998 – 29 October 1999	Achmad Tirtosudiro; Suparman Achmad; Jusuf Syakir; Agus Sudono
11	Portrait of Achmad Tirtosudiro	Achmad Tirtosudiro (1922–2011)	29 October 1999 – 31 July 2003	Sulasikin Murpratomo; Tarub; Ahmad Bagdja; Agus Sudono
Replaced by the Presidential Advisory Council
