= 1977 Indonesian legislative election =

- 2 May 1977

360 of the 460 seats in the House of Representatives 181 seats needed for a majority
- Registered: 70,378,750
- Turnout: 90.93% (▼2.48pp)
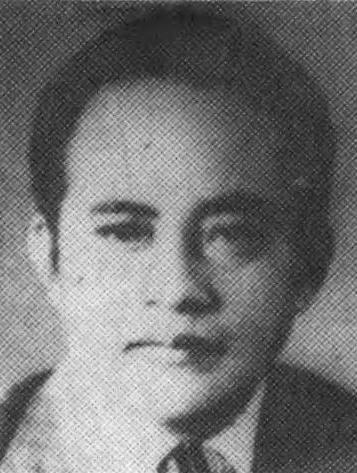

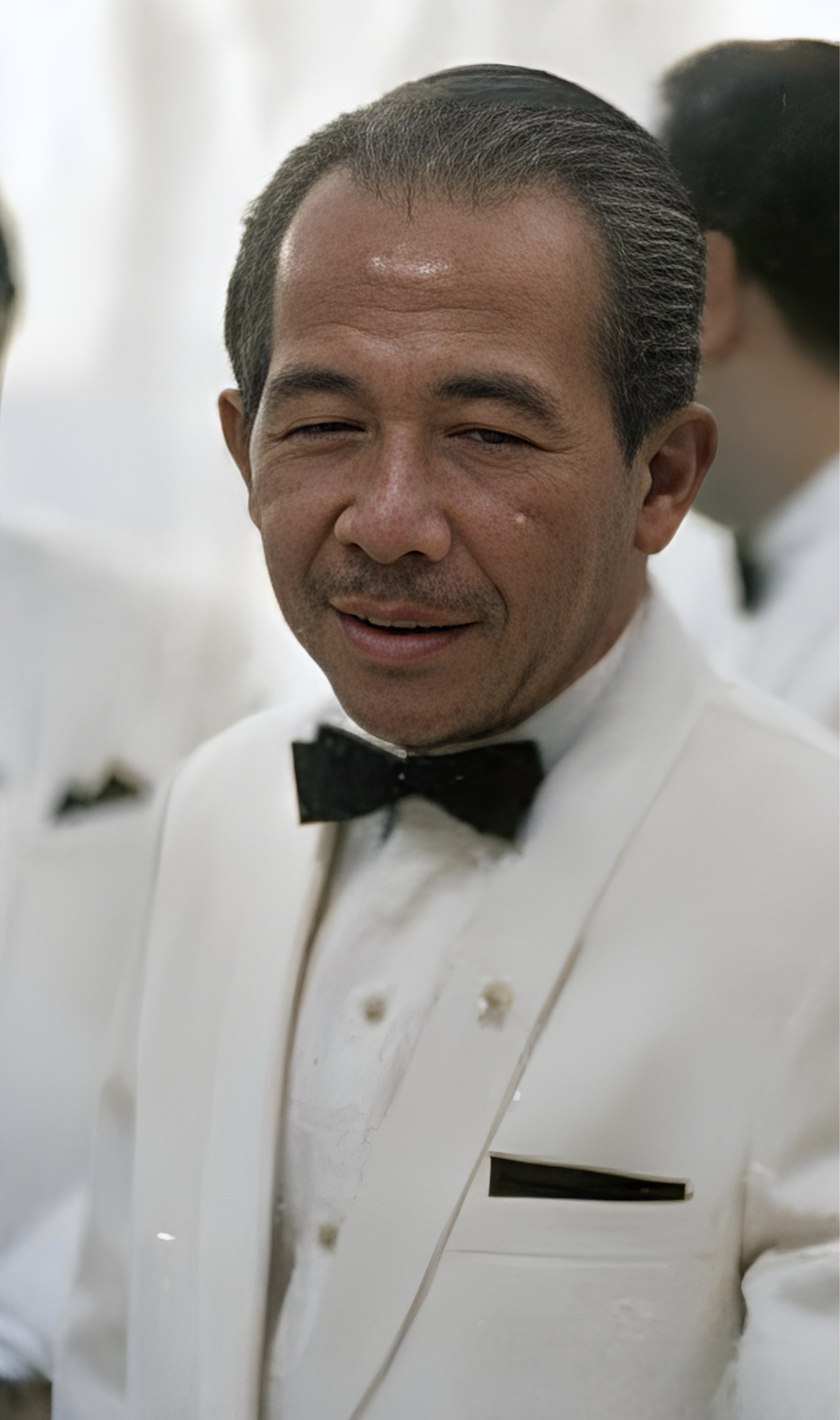

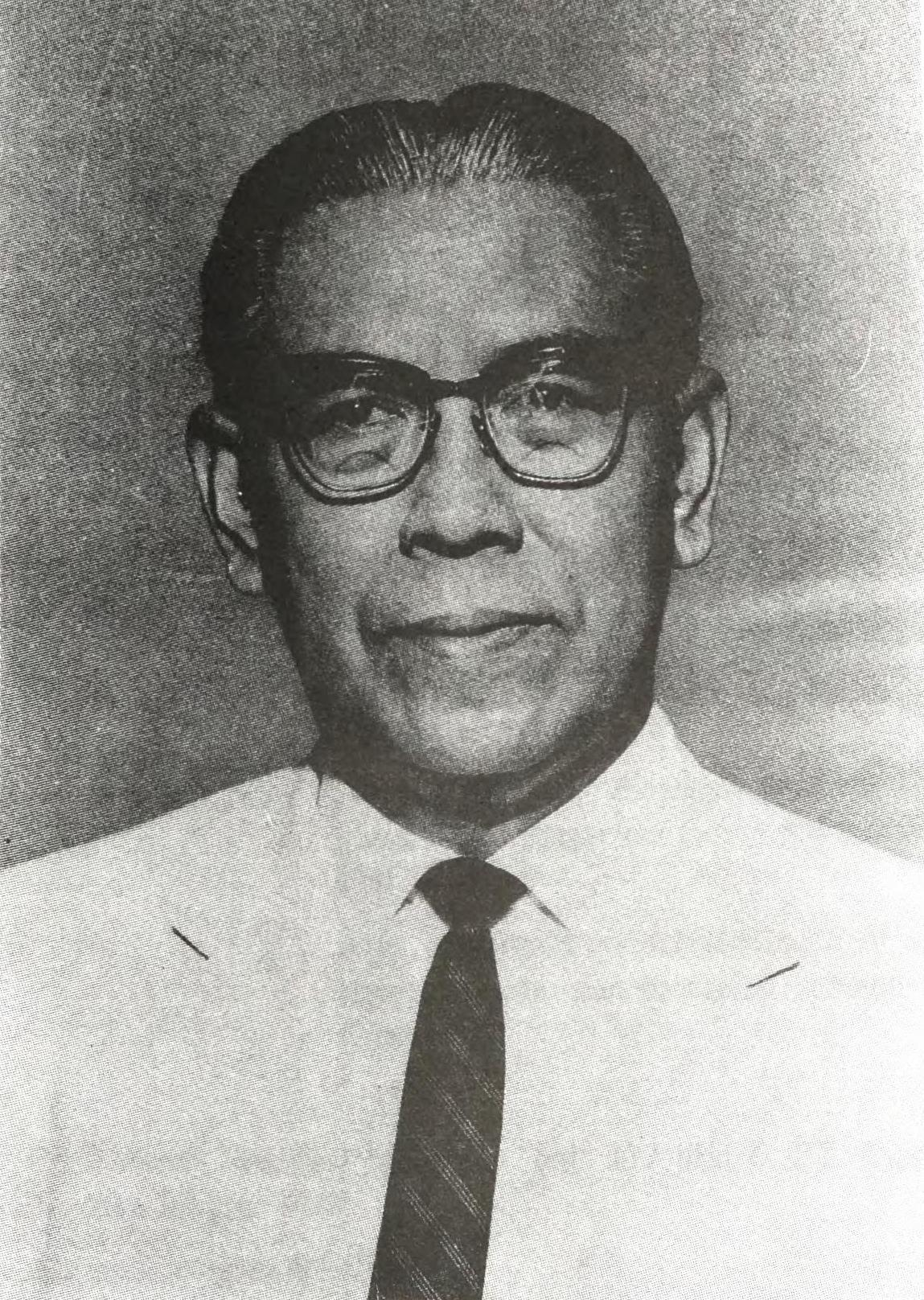
	First party	Second party	Third party
Leader	Amir Murtono	Mohammad Syafaat Mintaredja	Sanusi Hardjadinata
Party	Golkar	PPP	PDI
Last election	62.82%, 236 seats	27.12%, 94 seats (Note: Combined votes and seats of NU, Parmusi, PSII, and Perti.)	10.06%, 30 seats (Note: Combined votes and seats of PNI, Parkindo, Catholic Party, Murba, and IPKI.)
Seats won	232	99	29
Seat change	▼4	▲5	▼1
Popular vote	39,750,096	18,743,491	5,504,757
Percentage	62.11%	29.29%	8.60%
Swing	▼0.71pp	▲2.17pp	▼1.46pp
- Results by city and regency Golkar PPP
Speaker before election
Idham Chalid
NU
Elected Speaker
Adam Malik
Golkar

Legislative elections were held in Indonesia on 2 May 1977. They were the third legislative elections since independence, and the second under the New Order regime. There were three participants; the two political parties and functional group Golkar.

== Background ==
In 1971, the New Order regime of Indonesia held the first legislative elections since 1955 in an effort to establish a system of government with President Suharto and the Indonesian military in control and to give this system legitimacy. Thanks to government manipulation of the nine contesting parties and intervention by the government and the military, the government-sponsored Golkar organization won 63 percent of the vote, giving it 227 of the 251 directly elected seats in the DPR as well as all nine indirectly elected seats in Western New Guinea. Golkar was also awarded the remaining 100 seats according to the provisions of the 1969 Election Law, giving it 336, almost three quarters of the total.

President Suharto had long wanted the political parties to be "simplified," and in 1972, he said that this simplification would be complete if there were only three ballot symbols in the next election, a sentiment echoed by Suharto's personal assistant and head of the Special Operations (Opsus) unit Ali Murtopo, who said the 1976 election (as it was then scheduled) would only be contested by three "flags," namely those of the two parties and one functional group. In January 1973, this was realized in the forced fusion of the nine existing political parties into two: the four Islamic parties were combined into the United Development Party (PPP) and the nationalist and Christian parties formed the Indonesian Democratic Party (PDI).

In its 1973 session, the People's Consultative Assembly reelected Suharto president for a five-year term and passed a resolution stating that the election would be held at the latest by the end of 1977 and that there would be three participants, the two political parties and the 'functional group' Golkar. The election was finally scheduled for 1977, the extra year being necessary for the New Order to have enough time to make the necessary changes to laws to ensure its victory.

The government began preparing for the election in 1975 when it sent the necessary legislation for approval to the DPR. There were two bills, one on the party system and one on the organization of the election. They were designed to make it easier for Golkar to defeat the two parties by banning civil servants from joining political parties (i.e. not including Golkar), obliging parties to adopt the state philosophy Pancasila and the 1945 Constitution as their sole ideology and not allowing parties to organize below the level of the district. There was strong opposition to these proposals from both the parties, and this resulted in a compromise on all three, in particular with the PPP being allowed to be based on Islam.

As in 1971, the government screened all election candidates and disqualified 19% from the PPP, 16% from the PDI and 5% from Golkar.

== Campaign ==
The campaign lasted from 24 February to 24 April. The week before the 2 May vote was a "quiet week". During the campaign, there were a total of 203 recorded violations, 103 by the United Development Party, 38 by the Indonesian Democratic Party, 22 by Golkar, 15 by officers and 25 anonymously.

== Results ==
The 100 unelected seats were filled by appointed Golkar representatives, including 75 from ABRI and four from the new province of East Timor, which was "not yet able to hold elections." The newly elected members of the DPR were sworn in on 1 October 1977.

Party	Votes	%	Seats		
Party	Votes	%	Elected	Appointed	Total
Golkar	39,750,096	62.11	232	100	332
United Development Party	18,743,491	29.29	99	0	99
Indonesian Democratic Party	5,504,757	8.60	29	0	29
Total	63,998,344	100.00	360	100	460
Registered voters/turnout	70,378,750	–			
Source: KPU, Sudibjo

== Presidential election ==
Following the legislative election, the People's Consultative Assembly (MPR), the legislative branch of Indonesia, met from 22 to 23 March 1978 to elect both the president and vice president of the country for the 1978–1983 term. Golkar, the faction with the most seats in the People's Consultative Assembly since 1971, nominated Suharto as its presidential candidate. He was thus re-elected president unanimously to a third term on 22 March. Adam Malik was elected vice president on the next day.

In 1978, many candidates ran, including Ali Sadikin. Unfortunately, he did not win against Suharto. Ali Sadikin even sent a petition letter, but his candidacy was not accepted. Judilherry Justam and Armein Daulay also ran, but because they were considered actions that should not be done, the two students were arrested.
