= Fadli Zon =

Indonesian politician (born 1971)

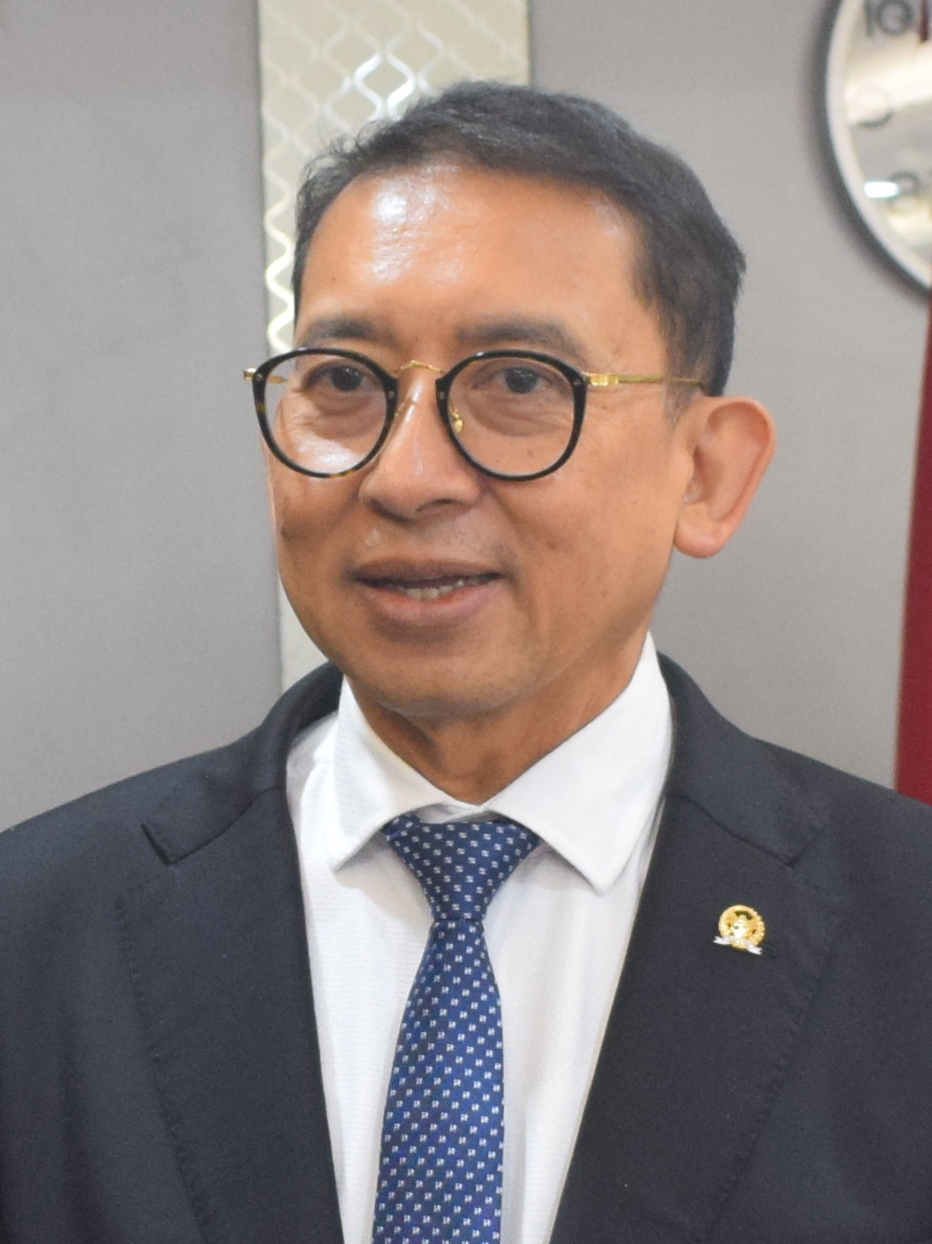
- Fadli Zon in 2024

4th Minister for Cultural Affairs
- Incumbent
- Assumed office 21 October 2024
- President: Prabowo Subianto
- Deputy: Giring Ganesha
- Preceded by: Nadiem Makarim (as Minister of Education, Culture, Research, and Technology)

Speaker of the House of Representatives
- Acting
- In office 11 December 2017 – 15 January 2018
- Preceded by: Setya Novanto
- Succeeded by: Bambang Soesatyo
- In office 16 December 2015 – 11 January 2016
- Preceded by: Setya Novanto
- Succeeded by: Ade Komarudin

First Deputy Speaker of the House of Representatives
- In office 2 October 2014 – 1 October 2019
- Speaker: Setya Novanto (2014–2015); Ade Komarudin (2016); Setya Novanto (2016–2017); Bambang Soesatyo (2018–2019)
- Preceded by: Priyo Budi Santoso
- Succeeded by: Azis Syamsuddin

Member of House of Representatives
- In office 1 October 2014 – 21 October 2024
- Constituency: West Java V
- Majority: 230,524 (2019); 149,258 (2024)

Personal details
- Born: 1 June 1971 (age 55) Jakarta, Indonesia
- Party: Gerindra (since 2008)
- Other political affiliations: PBB (1998–2001); Independent (2001–2008)
- Spouse: Katharine Grace
- Children: 2
- Education: Harlandale High School
- Alma mater: University of Indonesia (S.S., Dr.); London School of Economics (MSc)
- Occupation: Politician; historian; journalist; businessperson

Fadli Zon (born 1 June 1971) is an Indonesian politician and historian currently serving as Minister for Cultural Affairs. He was one of the founders of Prabowo Subianto's Gerindra Party (Gerindra), where he is vice chairman.

Fadli was one of the most vocal critics of President Joko Widodo during the president's first term, from 2014 to 2019, but he toned down his criticism after Gerindra joined the ruling coalition for Widodo's second term.

== Early life and education ==
Fadli was born in Jakarta on 1 June 1971, the eldest of three children of Zon Harjo and Ellyda Yatim, both from Minangkabau in West Sumatra. His father died when Fadli was a teenager.

Growing up in Cisarua, Bogor, Fadli attended Cibeureum 3 State Elementary School. From 1984 to 1986, he attended State Junior High School 1 Cisarua in Gadog, Bogor, before moving to Fajar Jakarta Junior High School (1986–1987). Subsequently, he attended State Senior High School 31 Jakarta in East Jakarta for two years (1987–1989), before receiving a scholarship from American Field Service to study from 1989 to 1990 at Harlandale High School in San Antonio, Texas, the United States, where he graduated summa cum laude.

Later, Fadli studied Russian literature at the University of Indonesia. Fadli was active in various organizations, both on and off campus. He chaired the Student Senate Education Bureau of the University of Indonesia's Faculty of Letters (FSUI) from 1992 to 1993. He served as the General Secretary of the FSUI Student Senate in 1993 and chaired the Student Senate Committee on External Relations from 1993 to 1994. Additionally, he was a member of the university's Literary Theater. Off campus, he held the positions of Secretary General and President of the Indonesian Students Association for International Studies (ISAFIS) from 1993 to 1995. He was also a member of the central committee of the Indonesian National Youth Committee (KNPI) from 1996 to 1999, as well as the central committee of the Islamic Youth Movement during the same period. In 1996, he became a member of the Asian Conference on Religion and Peace (ACRP).

In 1994, Fadli was named Mawapres I (Student Achievement I for most outstanding student) of the University of Indonesia and Student Achievement III at the national level. In the same year, he led the Indonesian student delegation at the ASEAN Varsities Debate IV in Malaysia.

In 2002, he attended the London School of Economics and Political Science (LSE) under the guidance of John Harriss and Robert Wade. He received a Master's of Science (M.Sc.) in Development Studies from LSE. In 2016, he earned a doctoral degree from the Department of History, Faculty of Cultural Sciences, University of Indonesia.

== Journalism ==
As a student, from 1990 to 1991, Fadli contributed to two Islam-oriented publications, Tabloid IQRA, which had been known for publishing derogatory statements on Hinduism, and Suara Hidayatullah magazine. He had been invited to contribute to the publications by journalist Dzikrullah W. Pramudya, one of his former high school classmates. Fadli's first article, an interview with Lukman Harun of the Muhammadiyah Muslim organization, was published by Tabloid IQRA. In 1990–91, Fadli also wrote for two youth-oriented magazines, Nona and Hai. In 1991, he contributed to Harian Terbit daily newspaper. From 1992 to 1994, he was an editor of Gema Angkatan 45, a politics magazine.

In 1993, he joined the editorial board of Horison literary magazine. From 1995 to 1996, he was an editor of fortnightly political news magazine Tajuk. In 1997, he became chief editor of Visi journal. In 2007, he joined the editorial board of Tani Merdeka magazine, and in 2011 he was editor-in-chief of Tabloid Gema Indonesia Raya.

== Political career ==
After graduating in 1997, Fadli was appointed to the People's Consultative Assembly (MPR), at that time the nation's top legislative assembly, as a representative of youth groups. In March 1998, the MPR unanimously re-elected then-president Suharto for a seventh term, despite rising anti-government protests throughout the country. After Suharto was forced to resign in May 1998, the country held free elections in 1999, after which Fadli lost his seat in the MPR.

Following the fall of Suharto, Fadli was one of the founders of the Islam-based Crescent Star Party and briefly became one of its chairmen, but he resigned in 2001.

In November 2007, Fadli met businessman Hashim Djojohadikusumo, the younger brother of Prabowo Subianto. Hashim, Fadli and Prabowo, then a member of Golkar, formed Gerindra in December 2007. The party participated in the 2009 elections, winning 4.46% of the votes and gaining 26 seats in parliament. Fadli himself did not gain a seat, receiving 11,077 votes in West Sumatra's electoral district 2, where the seat-winner received 21,348 votes.

In the 2014 elections, he ran again for parliament, this time in a West Java electoral district, where he received 79,074 votes, securing himself a seat in the House of Representatives. He was appointed as Deputy Speaker of the House for the 2014-2019 period. He served as Acting Speaker of the House in 2015–2016 and 2017–2018. He has led delegations of Indonesian legislators at various international, regional and bilateral forums.

In the 2019 General Election, he was re-elected as a member of parliament, and appointed chairman of the House Committee for Inter-Parliamentary Cooperation for the 2019–2024 period, as well as a member of the House commission on Defense, Foreign Affairs and Information. He was reelected for a third term in the 2024 general election with 149,258 votes.

He has been Vice Chairman of Gerindra Party Central Board and Vice Chair of Gerindra Supreme Leadership Council since 2008, and served for the 2020–2025 period.

=== As deputy speaker ===
After Joko Widodo's victory over Prabowo in the presidential elections, Gerindra formed an opposition coalition named Koalisi Merah Putih (Red and White Coalition), which initially held a parliamentary majority, comprising Gerindra, the PKS, the PAN, the PPP, and Golkar. Fadli frequently criticized Widodo's policies, from a ban on ministerial-level officials to speak in parliament, an alleged lèse-majesté case against a satay seller, to the revocation of national fuel subsidies.

In December 2015, when Setya Novanto resigned from his position as House speaker upon facing a corruption charge related to Freeport-McMoRan, Fadli briefly took up the speaker's position until Golkar assigned Ade Komaruddin as a replacement. In 2016, Komaruddin was removed from the position due to ethical misconduct and Novanto returned as speaker. Novanto was again implicated in another corruption case in 2017, and Fadli once more was appointed as acting speaker in late 2017. Fadli had sent a letter to the Corruption Eradication Commission (KPK) in 2017, asking it to suspend its criminal investigation into Setya Novanto, who was later tried and jailed for corruption. Anti-corruption activists reported Fadli to the House's ethics council, alleging he had abused his position in an effort to help Setya. Fadli said he sent the letter in his capacity as a member of the public and not as a deputy House speaker.

=== Trump meeting ===
In 2015, Fadli and House Speaker Setya Novanto caused controversy by attending a press conference in the United States of then-presidential candidate Donald Trump. The two were accused of receiving graft (in form of Trump campaign accessories, which were seized by the Corruption Eradication Commission) and of misrepresenting the position of the legislative body. The two were later reprimanded for violating the House's code of conduct.

=== Praise of Putin ===
On 30 March 2018, in the run-up to Indonesia's 2019 presidential election, Fadli posted on Twitter that Indonesia needed a leader like Russian President Vladimir Putin. "If you want us to rise and be victorious, Indonesia needs a leader like Vladimir Putin: brave, visionary, intelligent, wise, not too many debts, not clueless," he tweeted. He then suggested Prabowo would be the such a leader: "PUTIN can also be an abbreviation for PRABOWO UNTUK INDONESIA [Prabowo for Indonesia]. God willing he will help Indonesia rise up instead of going bankrupt." Indonesian Democratic Party of Struggle (PDIP) official Andreas Hugo Pareira responded to Fadli's stance by suggesting that he “just move to Russia”.

On 5 February 2019, Fadli tweeted an apology to the Russian Embassy in Jakarta, after Jokowi had complained that rival presidential candidate Prabowo was trying to win the election by using a “Russian propaganda” misinformation strategy, aided by foreign consultants, to divide the nation. Fadli tweeted: "I beg forgiveness for the statement of President @jokowi, which was hasty."

== Fake news lawsuit ==
On 12 March 2018, Fadli and fellow House of Representatives Deputy Chairman Fahri Hamzah were reported to Jakarta Police for allegedly spreading fake news and hate-speech on Twitter. Muhammad Rizki reported the pair for re-tweeting fake news from Jawa Pos online. Jawa Pos later clarified and removed the report, whereas Fadli and Fachri had kept the fake news. The report had falsely claimed the head of a fake news organization called Muslim Cyber Army was a supporter of Basuki Tjahaja 'Ahok' Purnama, the former Jakarta governor who was jailed after being convicted of insulting Islam. Rizki accused the deputy speakers of violating Indonesia's Law on Electronic Information and Transactions. Gerindra responded by saying it was ready to provide Fadli with legal assistance and called on police to be fair in handling the case.

== Business career ==
Between 1999 and 2007, Fadli was on the boards of directors of several energy and agricultural companies. He was director of business development for PT Tidar Kerinci Agung, which operates in the palm oil sector. He was director of rice company PT Padi Nusantara. He was a director general of Golden Spike Energy Indonesia Ltd, a private oil and gas company. Fadli has also chaired the Indonesian Farmers' Association (HKTI).

== Views on Chinese Indonesians ==
During the 1997–98 Asian financial crisis, Fadli was among Indonesian politicians who sought to blame the nation's financial problems on its ethnic Chinese minority. His sentiments were recorded in an interview conducted by Margot Cohen of Far Eastern Economic Review, published in February 1998:

Fadli Zon has a vision. The former student activist imagines his countrymen cycling slowly down Jakarta's Jalan Thamrin, a central boulevard normally choked with cars. Instead of Western clothes, everyone will be wearing sarongs made of rough cloth. "If necessary, we'll go backwards 10 or 15 years," he says fervently. "The Muslim majority is ready to face any challenge, as long as there is economic justice. We can start to develop our country without them." To Fadli, a rising young thinker and editor, "them" refers to Indonesia's tiny ethnic-Chinese minority, which he holds responsible for the country's deepening economic crisis. If "they" don't return their wealth parked overseas, he warns, it's payback time. Time for the 87% Muslim majority to seize the reins of an economy from a community that accounts for a mere 3% of the country's 200 million people. Time to construct a New Economic Policy that could go further than the Malaysian model in promoting the indigenous race. Time, too, for the military to help assert the rights of the nation's Muslims.

In May 1998, Jakarta was hit by deadly mass riots in which the ethnic Chinese were targeted and dozens of women were raped and some murdered. In his book on the riots, Fadli suggests the rapes did not occur:

"... we almost certainly come to the conclusion that the rapes (especially the mass rapes) were unlikely to have happened in a situation like the May 1998 turmoil. Psychologically, how could men commit rape under conditions like that? Besides, there is no strong evidence showing cases of rape committed by Muslims toward Chinese women."

His position against acknowledging the mass rapes have come under fire again during his term as Culture Minister in June 2025 when he made controversial statements that the events were just “rumors”. He would later soften his stances saying that in order to acknowledge the mass rapes, the proof that such incidents happened must be carefully studied and accurate evidences are needed because it concerns with national pride. He also stated that if sufficient evidence shows that mass rapes happened, he will support persecution against the perpetrators. This statement was however reacted negatively especially by Chinese Indonesians who considers the statement as a betrayal and opening of old wounds. It was also heavily criticized by the Civil Society Coalition, National Awakening Party, Indonesian Students Union - Netherlands and Amnesty International Indonesia. In response to the criticism, Fadli Zon refused to apologize for his remarks and said that differing opinions are welcomed and he can give additional contexts to his stance. He then clarified about his doubts that the rapes on Chinese Indonesians during the riots, saying that the mass rape is not in the scale happened during the Nanjing Massacre conducted by Imperial Japan, therefore cannot be qualified as such. His clarification received criticisms from Indonesian Democratic Party of Struggle members during a hearing on Fadli Zon's plan to rewrite Indonesia's history.

Fadli is a strident opponent of former Jakarta governor Ahok, who is of ethnic Chinese descent. Ahok was a member of Gerindra Party, which in 2012 had nominated him for the deputy governorship of Jakarta, a position to which he was elected that year. Ahok went on to become governor of Jakarta in October 2014, when Joko Widodo defeated Gerindra founder Prabowo in the presidential election. Ahok quit from the Gerindra in 2014 to protest the party's effort to scrap direct regional elections. Ahok's stance resulted in Fadli declaring Gerindra would not support him when he sought re-election in 2017. In 2016, Fadli joined a 4 November rally demanding Ahok be jailed for alleged blasphemy against Islam. He also wrote a poem titled “Poem for the Blasphemer”, which accused the subject of destroying diversity, disrupting religious harmony, and being a traitor to Pancasila.

== Historical Revisionism ==
As Culture Minister of Indonesia overseeing the rewriting of the official government historical record, Fadli frequently made claims which go against the general consensus. He denies the existence of mass rape occurring predominantly against Chinese Indonesians during the 1998 riots and the role of General Suharto in the 1965-66 anti-communist mass-killings during his efforts to award Suharto the title of National Hero of Indonesia. In response, critics pointed out his closeness with Prabowo Subianto, then general during the 1998 riots and Suharto's own son in law. This fact is used to allege that Prabowo Subianto who is president during his term as Culture Minister is using Fadli and his role overseeing Indonesia's official history to erase Suharto's and his own role in atrocities during the New Order era.

== Organizations ==
Fadli holds several positions in international and regional organizations. He is the Vice Chair of the Global Organization of Parliamentarians Against Corruption (GOPAC) and Vice President of the League of Parliamentarians for Al Quds, and Chair of Southeast Asian Parliamentarians Against Corruption (SEAPAC). Previously, he was the President of GOPAC for the 2015–2017 and 2017–2019 periods.

Fadli chaired the Indonesian Farmers Association (HKTI) for the 2015–2020 and was retained as chairman for the 2020–2025 period. He is chairman of the Indonesia Philatelic Association for the 2017–2022 period, and chaired the Indonesia Keris Society for the 2016–2021 period. He is chairman of the Islamic Cultural Arts Association (HSBI), the oldest Islamic cultural arts organization in Indonesia.

== Foreign travel as a legislator ==
- Head of the Indonesian House of Representatives Delegation to the 14th Conference Parliamentary Union of the OIC Member States (PUIC), Rabat, Morocco, 11 – 15 March 2019;
- Head of the Indonesian House of Representatives Delegation on a Working Visit to Egypt, 5 – 10 March 2019;
- Head of the Indonesian House of Representatives Delegation to the 27th Annual Meeting of the Asia-Pacific Parliamentary Forum (APPF), Seam Reap, Cambodia, 13 – 18 January 2019;
- Head of the Indonesian House of Representatives Delegation on a Working Visit to Malaysia, 19 December 2018;
- Head of the Indonesian House of Representatives Delegation on a Working Visit to Thailand, 30 November – 2 December 2018;
- Head of the Indonesian House of Representatives Delegation on a Working Visit to United Kingdom, 13 – 20 November 2018;

== Library and culture ==
Fadli established the Fadli Zon Library in Jakarta in 2008. According to the Indonesian World Records Museum (MURI), it is the country's largest private library and also includes Indonesia's "most complete" coin and stamp collections. The library holds over 50,000 volumes, including ancient manuscripts, old newspapers, rare books, traditional weapons (kris, spear, sword, badik), long-play records, historical textiles, eyeglasses, paintings, statues, and other cultural artifacts. Fadli has also established the Fadli Zon Cultural House in Tanah Datar, West Sumatra; the Fadli Zon Creative House in Depok, West Java; and the Sundanese Cultural Village in Bogor, West Java. He has received 30 MURI records for his collections and other cultural activities.

Fadli has a large collection of traditional kris daggers and chaired the Indonesian National Kris Secretariat for the 2016–2021 term.

== Personal life ==
Fadli is married to Katharine Grace, a banker, and they have two daughters.

== Awards ==
Fadli is the recipient of several awards.

- AIPA Distinguished Service Award from ASEAN Inter-Parliamentary Assembly (AIPA), 2021.
- Bintang Mahaputera Nararya from President Joko Widodo, awarded at the State Palace, 13 August 2020.
- Champion of Corruption Award, from the African Parliamentarians Network Against Corruption (APNAC), 2019.
- Best Achiever in Legislator, from Obsession Awards, 2017.
- Kanjeng Pangeran Aryo Kusumo Yudho, from Keraton Surakarta Hadiningrat, February 2012.
- Kanjeng Pangeran Kusumo Hadiningrat, from Keraton Surakarta Hadiningrat, June 2011.
- Tuanku Muda Pujangga Diraja, from Daulat Yang Dipertuan Raja Alam Minangkabau, 2009.
- Datuk Bijo Dirajo Nan Kuning, from his ancestors' land, Lima Puluh Kota Regency, West Sumatra.

== Books ==
Fadli is the author of several books, some published by his Fadli Zon Library.

- The Politics of the May 1998 Riots (2004). Refutes allegations that Prabowo masterminded the 1998 May riots and argues against assertions made in former military chief Wiranto's book about the riots, Witness in the Storm (2003).
- The IMF Game: The Role of the IMF in Bringing Down the Suharto Regime in May 1998 (2004).
- Wiranto Lepas Tangan: kesaksian Kivlan Zen dan Fadli Zon sekitar huru-hara Mei 1998(Wiranto Washes His Hands: Testimony of Kivlan Zen and Fadli Zon concerning the Mat 1998 riots) (2004). Co-authored with Kivlan Zen.
- Hari terakhir Kartosoewirjo: 81 foto eksekusi Imam DI/TII (2012). Concerns the execution of Kartosuwirjo, a Darul Islam leader and revolutionary.
- Dreams I Keep: A Collection of Poems, 1983-1991 (2013).
- Menyusuri lorong waktu (Walking the Passage of Time) (2016). An autobiography.
- Keris Minangkabau (Minangkabau Kris) (2016). Co-authored with Basuki Teguh Yuwono.
- Pangan dan Pertanian di Era Neoliberal (Food and Agriculture in the Neoliberal Era) (2016).
- Pemikiran Ekonomi Kerakyatan Mohammad Hatta: Jalan Politik Kemakmuran Indonesia (Mohammad Hatta’s Thought on People’s Economy: the Road to Indonesia's Political Prosperity) (2016).
- Orkes Gumarang: Kisah Syaiful Nawas (Orkes Gumarang: The Story of Syaiful Nawas) (2017).
- Orkes Gumarang: Jiwa Yoes Rizal (Orkes Gumarang: Soul Yoes Rizal) (2017).
- Kumpulan Puisi Memeluk Waktu (Embrace Time) (2017).
- Berpihak Pada Rakyat (Siding with the People) (2018).
- Passing Through The Hall of Time (2018).
- Keris Lombok (Lombok Kris) (2018).
- Kujang Pasundan (Pasundan Cleaver) (2018).
- Asmujiono: Pengibar Merah Putih di Puncak Everest (Asmujiono: Red and White (Flag) Raiser on the Top of Everest) (2019).
- Kata Fadli: Catatan-Catatan Kritis Dari Senayan (Fadli: Critical Notes from Senayan)(2019).
- Strengthening The Indonesian Parliamentary Diplomacy (2019).

== Further information ==
- Fadli Zon Library
- The House of Representatives of the Republic of Indonesia
- Great Indonesia Movement Party
- World Records Museum of Indonesia
- Inter-Parliamentary Union
