= Anak Kolong =

2024 coming of age film

- Directed by: Sony Gaokasak
- Story by: Sony Gaokasak; Novi Pritania
- Produced by: Agustinus Sitorus
- Starring: Junior Roberts; Aisyah Aqilah; Antonio Blanco Jr. William Roberts; Bonny Putra; Suheil Fahmi Bisyir; Rizky Hanggono; Ida Rhijnsburger; Jameelah Saleem; Daood Saleem; Joe P Project; Robert Chaniago; Krisna Murti Wibowo
- Music by: Ganden Bramanto S
- Production company: PIM Pictures
- Release date: 7 November 2024
- Running time: 103 minutes
- Country: Indonesia
- Language: Indonesian

Anak Kolong (transl. Child soldier) is a 2024 Indonesian Coming of age film directed by Sony Gaokasak, written by Sony Gaokasak, and Novi Pritania. Produced by Agustinus Sitorus under the banners of PIM Pictures. This narrative follows the journey of Arya who is the child of a soldier.

== Plot ==
Anak Kolong is set in 1992 in the city of Bandung. This film tells the story of the friendship between four teenage boys and one teenage girl. These five teenagers have something in common, namely their fathers who work in the TNI and Polri.

In this film, the friendship between Arya, Salim, Wempi, Ucok, and Amira is filled with various challenges and conflicts, ranging from the struggle to pursue dreams, personal ambitions, to love relationships.

Arya is a teenager who grew up in the hopes and pressure of his father who educated him with strict discipline. However, his father's education actually made him a child who often rebelled.

In the midst of the doubts and inner turmoil that Arya felt, he slowly began to realize that he had feelings for Amira, his friend. However, these feelings did not go smoothly because Salim, his friend, also had feelings for Amira.

Amira's gentle and wise figure often became a balance among her friends who lived in a military environment full of pressure. Her presence plunges Arya and Salim into a complex emotional conflict, challenging them to express their feelings while risking their long-standing friendship.

== Cast ==
- Junior Roberts as Arya
- Aisyah Aqilah as Amira
- Antonio Blanco Jr. as Salim
- William Roberts as Adit
- Bonny Putra as Ucok
- Suheil Fahmi Bisyir as Wempi
- Rizky Hanggono as Darto
- Ida Rhijnsburger as Sri
- Jameelah Saleem as Ajeng
- Daood Saleem as Aldi
- Joe P Project as Indro
- Robert Chaniago as Jeffry
- Krisna Murti Wibowo as Lesmana

== Production ==
=== Casting ===
Junior Roberts was selected to portray Arya. Aisyah Aqilah was hired to portray Amira. Antonio Blanco Jr. was roped to portray Salim. William Roberts who known as Junior Roberts's younger brother was cast as Adit.

=== Release ===
The film was released on 7 November 2024.

=== Development ===
Bambang Soesatyo, Speaker of the People's Consultative Assembly (2019–2024) and Deputy General Chairperson of the Communication Forum for Sons and Daughters of Retired Military Personnel and Sons and Daughters of the TNI-Polri officially announced Anak Kolong on 24 April 2024.
