= Puteri Anetta Komarudin =

Indonesian politician (born 1993)

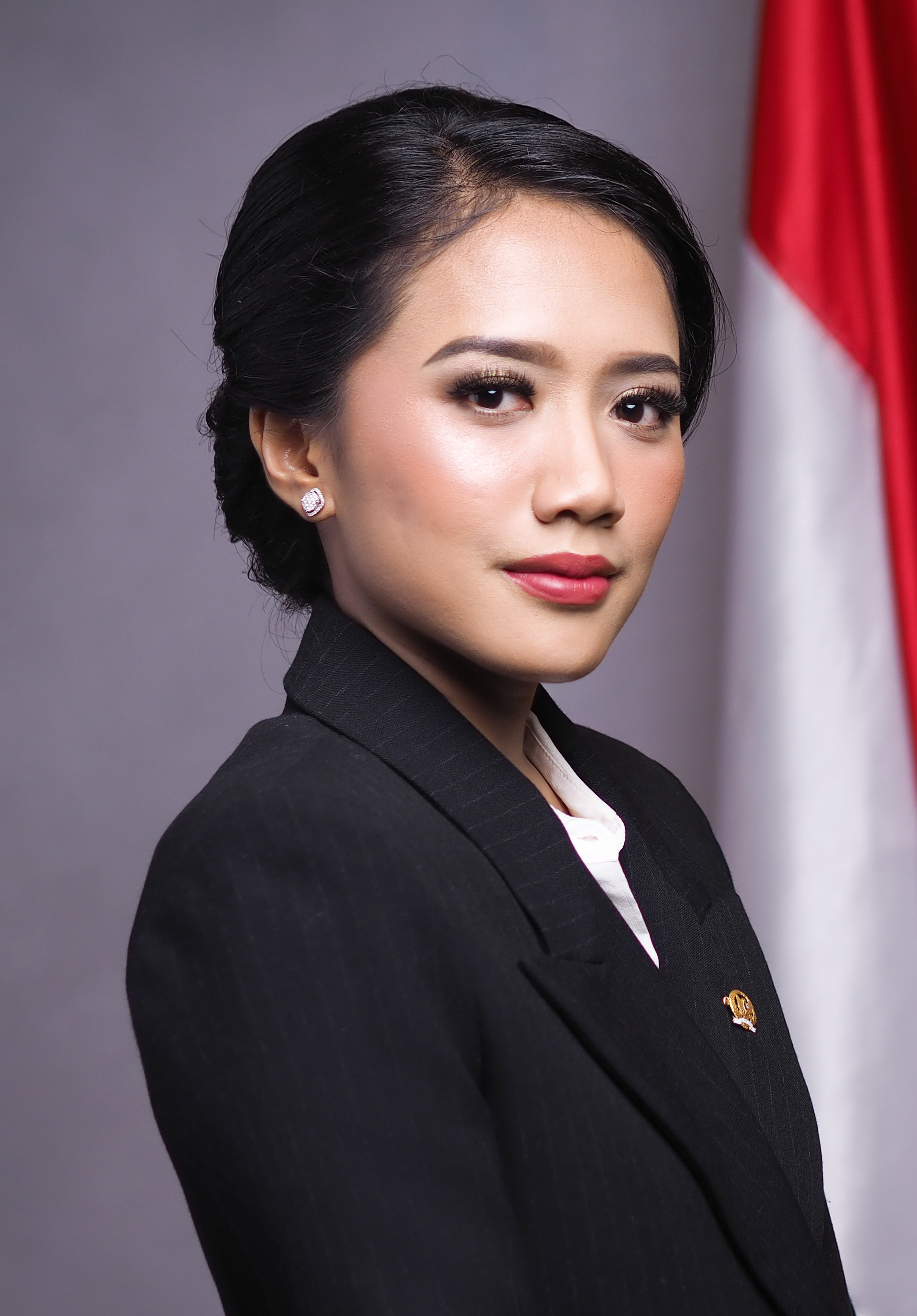

Member of the House of Representatives
- Incumbent
- Assumed office 1 October 2019
- Constituency: West Java VII

Personal details
- Born: Puteri Anetta Komarudin; August 21, 1993 (age 33) Bandung, West Java, Indonesia
- Party: Golkar
- Spouse: Andika Resha Pradipta
- Children: 2
- Parents: Ade Komarudin (father); Netty Marliza (mother)
- Education: University of Melbourne

Puteri Anetta Komarudin (born 21 August 1993) is an Indonesian politician and a member of the House of Representatives serving since 2019. She is a member of the Golkar Party.

== Life and career ==
She was born in Bandung, Indonesia, on 21 August 1993. She is the daughter of Ade Komarudin, a senior politician from Purwakarta who has served for the DPR for five consecutive terms. She completed her bachelor in economics at the University of Melbourne. She has been active for Indonesian Student Association, advocating for rights of Indonesian migrants. She worked as a Junior Bank Supervisor in the Financial Services Authority for three years.

In 2019, she successfully ran as a candidate for the Golkar Party in the Electoral District of West Java VII. She was reelected for a second term in the 2024 election with 142,046 votes.
