= Ministry of Culture (Indonesia) =

Government ministry of Indonesia

- Kementerian Kebudayaan
- Logo of Ministry of Culture

- Flag of Ministry of Culture

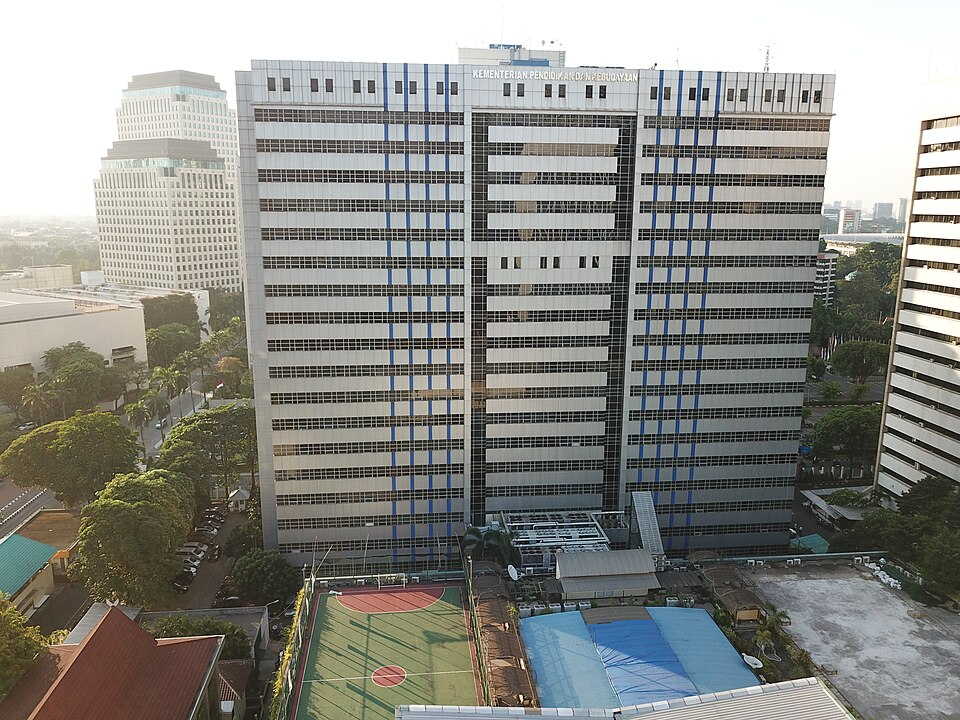
- Ministry of Culture headquarters

Ministry overview
- Formed: March 31, 1966; 20 October 2024; 22 months ago
- Preceding agencies: Directorate General of Culture; Ministry of Education, Culture, Research, and Technology
- Jurisdiction: Government of Indonesia
- Headquarters: Ministry of Culture Complex, Building E, 4th Floor, Jl. Jenderal Sudirman, Jakarta; 6.225288001645111°S 106.80196195337253°E
- Annual budget: Rp2,37 trillion (2025)
- Minister responsible: Fadli Zon, Minister of Culture
- Deputy Minister responsible: Giring Ganesha, Deputy Minister of Culture
- Website: kemenbud.go.id

The Ministry of Culture of the Republic of Indonesia (Indonesian: Kementerian Kebudayaan Republik Indonesia, abbreviated as Kemenbud RI or Kemenbud) is a ministry within the Indonesian Government tasked with organizing government affairs in the field of cultural advancement objects, cultural heritage, and other cultures. The Ministry of Culture is led by the Minister of Culture who since October 21, 2024 has been Fadli Zon.

== History ==
The discourse on the establishment of the Indonesian Ministry of Culture was put forward since 1945, a number of cultural figures, artists, and community leaders held a cultural conference in December in Sukabumi, West Java.

The nomenclature Culture was first used in the Syahrir III Cabinet as part of the Ministry of Education and Culture. Since then, cultural matters have become the responsibility of the Ministry of Education and Culture. In the Second Revised Dwikora Cabinet, a separate Ministry of Culture Affairs was formed, but it was merged again with the Ministry of Education and Culture in subsequent periods. In the Seventh Development Cabinet, cultural responsibilities were united into the Ministry of Tourism and lasted until the Second United Indonesia Cabinet, after which cultural responsibilities returned to being part of the Ministry of Education and Culture.

President Prabowo Subianto planned to form a Ministry of Culture Affairs in his campaign. After being elected, the promise was realized by appointing Fadli Zon as the second minister of culture.

== Organizational structure ==
Based on Presidential Decree No. 190/2024 and Minister of Culture Decree No. 1/2024 and 2/2026, the Ministry of Culture is organized into the following:

- Minister of Culture
- Deputy Minister of Culture
- Secretariat General
  - Bureau of Planning and Finance
  - Bureau of Law and Partnerships
  - Bureau of Public Relations and Public Information
  - Bureau of Organization and Human Resources
  - Bureau of State-owned Assets, Procurement, and General Affairs
- Directorate General of Protection of Culture and Tradition (Directorate General I)
  - Directorate General of Protection of Culture and Tradition Secretariat
  - Directorate of Fostering and Guidance of Beliefs to the One Almighty God and Indigenous People
  - Directorate of History and Museums
  - Directorate of Cultural Heritage
  - Directorate of Cultural Values Empowerment and Facilitation of Intellectual Property Rights
  - Museum and Cultural Heritage (Indonesian Heritage Agency)
  - Aceh Cultural Preservation Institute
  - North Sumatera Cultural Preservation Institute
  - West Sumatera Cultural Preservation Institute
  - Riau Cultural Preservation Institute
  - Bangka Belitung Islands Cultural Preservation Institute
  - South Sumatera Cultural Preservation Institute
  - Bengkulu Cultural Preservation Institute
  - Lampung Cultural Preservation Institute
  - Banten Cultural Preservation Institute
  - Jakarta Cultural Preservation Institute
  - West Java Cultural Preservation Institute
  - Central Java Cultural Preservation Institute
  - Yogyakarta Cultural Preservation Institute
  - East Java Cultural Preservation Institute
  - West Kalimantan Cultural Preservation Institute
  - Central Kalimantan Cultural Preservation Institute
  - East Kalimantan Cultural Preservation Institute (serving East Kalimantan and Nusantara)
  - Bali Cultural Preservation Institute
  - East Nusa Tenggara Cultural Preservation Institute
  - West Nusa Tenggara Cultural Preservation Institute
  - North Sulawesi Cultural Preservation Institute
  - Central Sulawesi Cultural Preservation Institute
  - South Sulawesi Cultural Preservation Institute
  - Maluku Cultural Preservation Institute
  - North Maluku Cultural Preservation Institute
  - Papua Cultural Preservation Institute (serving Papua, Central Papua, Highlands Papua, and South Papua)
  - Southwest Papua Cultural Preservation Institute (serving West Papua and Southwest Papua)
  - Gorontalo Cultural Preservation Office
  - West Sulawesi Cultural Preservation Office
  - Southeast Sulawesi Cultural Preservation Office
- Directorate General of Cultural Diplomacy, Promotion, and Cooperation (Directorate General II)
  - Directorate General of Cultural Diplomacy, Promotion, and Cooperation
  - Directorate of Cultural Diplomacy
  - Directorate of Cultural Promotion
  - Directorate of Cultural Cooperation
- Directorate General of Development, Utilization, and Fostering of Culture (Directorate General III)
  - Directorate General of Development, Utilization, and Fostering of Culture Secretariat
  - Directorate of Film, Music, and Arts
  - Directorate of Cultural Facilities and Infrastructures
  - Directorate of Digital Cultural Development
  - Directorate of Development of Cultural Human Resources and Cultural Institutions
  - Cultural Media Management Office
  - Film Censorship Institution
- Inspectorate General
  - Inspectorate General Secretariat
  - Inspectorate General I
  - Inspectorate General II
- Board of Experts
  - Senior Expert to the Minister for Law and Cultural Policy
  - Senior Expert to the Minister for Economics and Cultural Industry
  - Senior Expert to the Minister for Inter-Institutional Relations

== Official Indonesia History Series ==
Started from the 2025, the ministry is working on the Official Indonesia History Series (Seri Sejarah Indonesia). The project chaired by Prof. Susanto Zuhdi, professor of Maritime History of the University of Indonesia and spent Rp 9 billion for the project. On 31 August 2026, the ministry, through its research arm, Directorate of History and Museums of the Directorate General of Protection of Culture and Tradition, after collaborated with 123 experts from 34 universities and 11 institutions, produced the Official Indonesia History Series. Five volumes from the planned 10 volumes released for the public. The ministry also added that the Official Indonesia History will also come with a single volume of Supplementary Factbook called Faktaneka. Resulting the total of the expected body of the works reaching 11 volumes in its final form. Minister Fadli Zon claimed that the books used to rewrite the history based on the Indonesia' perspectives, not of Dutch colonialists' perspectives that used as teaching material in the schools for long time, strengthening Indonesia' national identity, and making it relevant to this day and also closing the 26-years "Blank Period" in Indonesian History.

It covers the prehistoric Indonesia, from ~51,000 years ago from Lubang Jeriji Saléh cave paintings, until modern Indonesia under the administration of Joko Widodo.
