= Dito Ariotedjo =

Indonesian businessman and politician

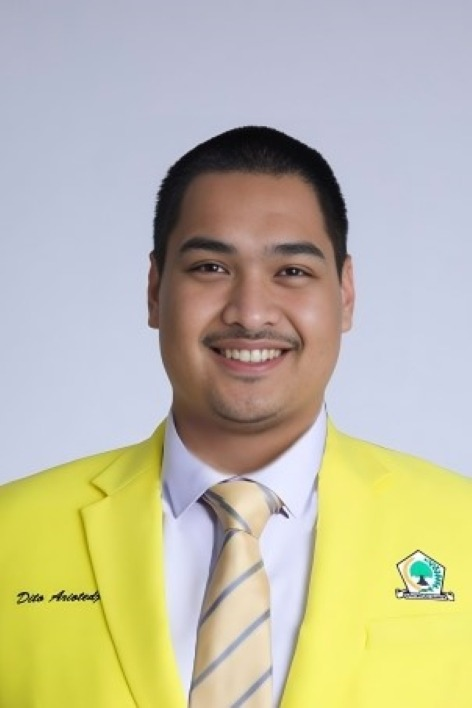

14th Minister of Youth and Sports
- In office 3 April 2023 – 8 September 2025
- President: Joko Widodo; Prabowo Subianto
- Deputy: Taufik Hidayat
- Preceded by: Zainudin Amali; Muhadjir Effendy (interim)
- Succeeded by: Erick Thohir

Personal details
- Born: 25 September 1990 (age 35) Jakarta, Indonesia
- Party: Golkar
- Spouse: Niena Kirana Riskyana Fuad (m. 2018; sep. 2025)
- Children: 1
- Parents: Arie Prabowo Ariotedjo (father); Arti Laksmigati (mother)
- Education: University of Indonesia (S.H.)

Ario Bimo Nandito Ariotedjo, better known as Dito Ariotedjo (born 25 September 1990) is an Indonesian businessman and politician who served as Minister of Youth and Sports from 2023 to 2025.

== Early life and education ==
Dito was born in Jakarta on 25 September 1990, to Arie Prabowo Ariotedjo and Arti Laksmigati Ariotedjo. He is the third child of the couple. Dito has 2 older siblings, Aryo Prakoso Ariotedjo and Dwi Lestari Pramesti Ariotedjo. His father was the president director of Aneka Tambang between 2017 and 2019. Dito's grandfather, Sri Bimo Ariotedjo, was an air marshal in the Indonesian Air Forces and served as Indonesia's ambassador to the Philippines.

Dito was educated at the Tarakanita 2 Elementary School, the Al-Izhar Junior High School, and State Senior High School No. 6, all in Jakarta. He graduated from the Faculty of Law of the University of Indonesia (UI) in 2012. Dito was a member of the Muslim Students' Association during his time at UI. As a student, he was appointed as treasurer of his faculty's student union.

== Business career ==
Before he graduated from UI, he had established several startups, later organized under the holding company and venture capital firm Grupara Ventures in 2013. He established or co-established startups in the energy and military sectors, in addition to developing co-working spaces. With Raffi Ahmad and Rudy Salim, he co-founded the sports company RANS Sport, and was chairman of the company-owned football team RANS Nusantara F.C.

He had also worked for some time in the energy firm Medco Power Indonesia.

== Political career ==
In 2017, he was appointed as Head of Angkatan Muda Pembaharuan Indonesia (Indonesian Renewal Young Force), a mass organization under Golkar. He was later appointed as Division Head of Social Innovation and Mass Organization of Golkar Party's Central Committee. Immediately prior to his ministerial appointment, he was Head of Innovation and Creativity Institute within Golkar. He also worked under Golkar chairman Airlangga Hartanto as an expert advisor at the Coordinating Minister for Economic Affairs.

On 3 April 2023, he was appointed as Minister of Youth and Sports, replacing the resigning Zainudin Amali. He was the youngest and second millennial to Nadiem Makarim to be appointed a government minister in Indonesia.

== Personal life ==
He married Niena Kirana Riskyana Fuad in 2018. Niena is a daughter of Fuad Hasan Masyhur, one of members of Golkar's central leadership and one of founder and owner of Maktour, a national-level hajj and umrah travel agency. The couple had a daughter, Sadia Kiera Nadashana Nandito, who was born in 2020.

In May 2025, he separated from her wife, Niena. She filed for divorce twice, June 2025 and December 2025. Later, he confirmed the divorce process to the media, citing undisclosed differences.
