= Setya Novanto =

Indonesian politician (born 1955)

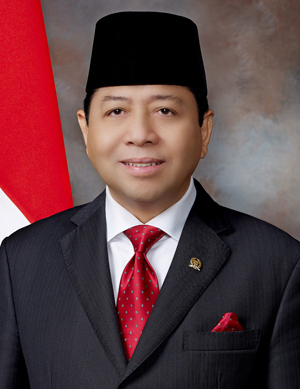
- Official portrait, 2006

16th Speaker of the House of Representatives
- In office 30 November 2016 – 11 December 2017
- Preceded by: Ade Komarudin
- Succeeded by: Fadli Zon (acting); Bambang Soesatyo
- In office 2 October 2014 – 16 December 2015
- Preceded by: Marzuki Alie
- Succeeded by: Fadli Zon (acting); Ade Komarudin

10th General Chairman of Golkar
- In office 17 May 2016 – 13 December 2017
- Preceded by: Aburizal Bakrie
- Succeeded by: Airlangga Hartarto

Member of House of Representatives
- In office 1 October 1999 – 11 December 2017
- Succeeded by: Imanuel Ekadianus Blegur
- Constituency: East Timor (October 1999); East Nusa Tenggara (1999–2004); East Nusa Tenggara II (2004–2017)

Personal details
- Born: 12 November 1955 (age 70) Bandung, Indonesia
- Party: Golkar
- Spouses: Luciana Lily Herliyanti; Deisti Astriani Tagor
- Education: Widya Mandala Catholic University; Trisakti University
- Occupation: Politician; legislator
- Nickname: Setnov

Setya Novanto (born 12 November 1955), colloquially referred to as Setnov, is an Indonesian former politician, presently serving a 15 year prison sentence for corruption. He was chairman of Golkar Party and speaker of the People's Representative Council (Indonesian: Dewan Perwakilan Rakyat, DPR) until his arrest in 2017 for corruption. Born in Bandung, he entered politics in 1998 after a business career and became a member of the People's Representative Council following the 1999 general election. After he was re-elected for a third time in the 2014 general election, won by the Indonesian Democratic Party of Struggle, he was appointed DPR (Parliament) Speaker by the majority opposition coalition.

In 1998, Setya became vice-treasurer of Golkar's central organization, and the following year was elected to the People's Representative Council, beginning his political career. However, his political career was plagued by corruption scandals. He resigned as DPR speaker in late 2015 amid an ethics investigation, but the following year, he was appointed chairman of Golkar, switched the party's allegiance to the governing coalition, and was reappointed DPR speaker in November 2016. Despite facing multiple allegations of corruption, he did not face trial until his implication in the embezzlement of funds from a national electronic ID card program. Following his arrest by the Corruption Eradication Commission in November 2017, he resigned as DPR speaker for a second time and was later removed as Golkar chairman. He was sentenced to 15 years imprisonment in April 2018. Since then, he has often left jail, purportedly for medical examinations, although he was once spotted at a shopping center.

== Early life, education and career ==
The fifth of eight children, Setya Novanto was born on 12 November 1955 in the West Java capital of Bandung to Sewondo Mangunratsongko and Julia Maria Sulastri. After he completed kindergarten, his family moved to the East Java capital of Surabaya, where he went to elementary school. His parents later divorced, with his father remaining in Surabaya, while his mother and the children moved to Jakarta in 1967. His mother made a living by selling cakes from door to door. Setya attended Tebet Junior High School 73 (1967–70) and then Senior High School 9 in South Jakarta (1970–73).

After high school, Setya moved back to Surabaya for higher education, but he reportedly refused to stay with his father and instead stayed with friends. He studied accounting management at Widya Mandala Catholic University. He sold honey and rice to support himself, starting with capital of just Rp82,500 and growing to running two trucks selling rice delivered from Lamongan regency. He also operated a stall at the city’s Keputren Market but reportedly fell afoul of dishonest partners.

While still a student, Setya founded a company called Mandar Teguh with Hartawan, the son of the director of Bank Rakyat Indonesia for Surabaya. He was hired by a Suzuki dealership as a car salesman for the Eastern Indonesia region. He also worked as a model and was awarded the title of Most Handsome Man of Surabaya in 1975.

After graduating from university in 1979, Setya worked for PT Anindya Cipta Perdana, a company variously described as a distributor of fertilizer, cement and building materials for East Nusa Tenggara province. The company was owned by Setya’s former high school classmate, Hayono Isman, who would later become youth affairs and sports minister under president Suharto. PT Anindya Cipta Perdana reportedly failed after two years, but it led to Setya's long-running involvement with East Nusa Tenggara, which he would later represent as a legislator for four terms for Golkar Party. He was reported to be a frequent donor to churches and farmers on his visits to the province, but environmentalists accused him of exploiting local people for his financial benefit.

Setya returned to Jakarta in 1979 and stayed at Hayono’s Menteng house. According to Leo Nababan, a deputy secretary general of Golkar, Setya became the personal driver of the Hayono family. In Jakarta, Setya studied accounting at Trisakti University and opened a photocopying service near the campus to support himself.

Setya’s business career took off after he married Luciana Lily Herliyanti, the daughter of West Java Police deputy chief Brigadier General Sudharsono. He started managing his in-laws’ gas station in Cikokol, Tangerang, then branched out into livestock, contracting, buying and selling paper and textiles, and developing hotels and golf courses. His business interests were spread across Jakarta, Batam and Kupang.

As a businessman, Setya proved adept at lobbying and networking, especially among people close to officials, from aides to personal secretaries and subordinates. He was also comfortable carrying the bags of high-ranking military officers, such as General Wismoyo Arismunandar. This gave him entry to the elite community of Indonesian sports organizations, which were dominated by senior military officials and tycoons. In 1986, Setya completed the Nagoya Plaza Hotel project on Batam Island. Seeking more capital for a bigger resort, he tried to approach Suharto’s cousin, tycoon Sudwikatmono. Setya reportedly spent days at a parking lot, from 6am to 10pm, trying to speak to Sudwikatmono, who finally decided to give him a chance. Their partnership led to the opening in 1989 of the Talvas Golf and Country Club (later redeveloped as the Palm Springs Golf & Beach Resort), a 400-hectare golf course and resort on Batam that cost $100 million. This was followed by more resorts and hotels, and telecommunications and satellite projects.

From 1995 to 1996, Setya was chairman of Bamuhas Kosgoro, one of Golkar's constituent organizations. He was treasurer of the National Sports Committee of Indonesia from 1995 to 2003.

== Dealings with Suharto family ==
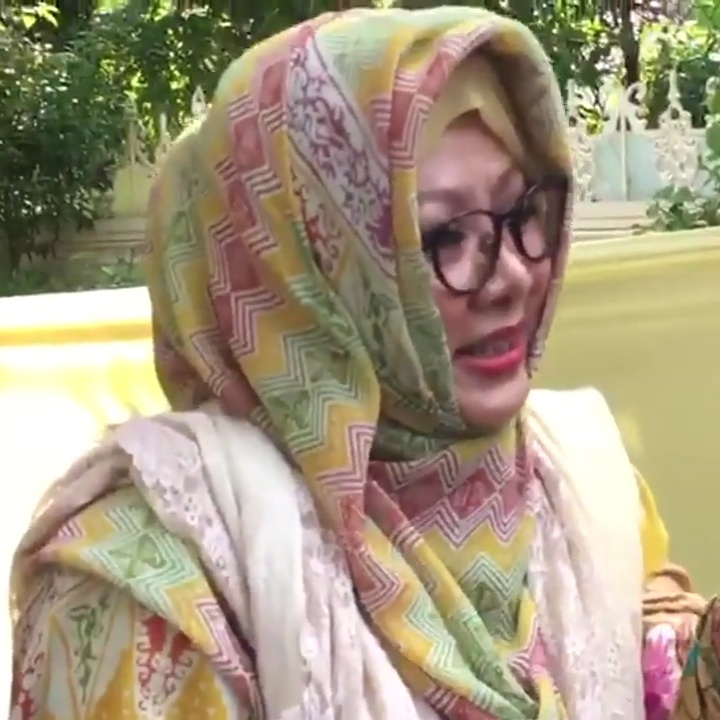
Siti Hardiyanti Rukmana

Setya first met Suharto in 1989 at the opening of the Talvas golf course on Batam.

In 1991, Suharto’s eldest daughter, Siti Hardiyanti Hastuti ‘Tutut’ Rukmana appointed Setya to lead PT Citra Permatasakti Persada (CPP), a company selected by police to make Indonesian driving licenses from 1992 to 1998. Of the official fee of Rp52,500 per license, Rp48,500 was allocated to CCP and the remaining Rp4,000 to the state treasury. In 1992, Rp48,500 was equivalent to $24. The State Audit Agency (BPK) recorded that from October 1992 to March 1998, PT CPP produced 16,575,710 licenses. The cost of producing a license at that time was put at Rp11,000.

In 1992, Elsye Sigit, the wife of Suharto’s oldest son Sigit Harjojudanto, appointed Setya to become involved in PT Solusindo Mitra Sejati (SMS), a company that was in February 1993 given a contract to computerize the system for making Indonesian identity cards. Data for ID cards had previously been entered on typewriters, enabling some individuals to hold multiple cards. An agreement between PT SMS and the Home Affairs Ministry was signed in February 1993. It was temporarily suspended by Home Affairs Minister Yogie Suardi Memet amid claims that some parties had been excluded from the deal. When the deal resumed, proposed fees in 1995 for identity cards, family cards, birth certificates and death certificates were raised between 100% and 350%.

Setya chaired a committee that produced a 1996 book titled President Suharto's Management as Narrated by 17 Ministers (Manajemen Presiden Soeharto dalam Penuturan 17 Menteri). He said the book was the result of two years of hard work and he hoped it would inspire Indonesia's younger generation to emulate the science and art of Suharto's management style.

== Political career ==
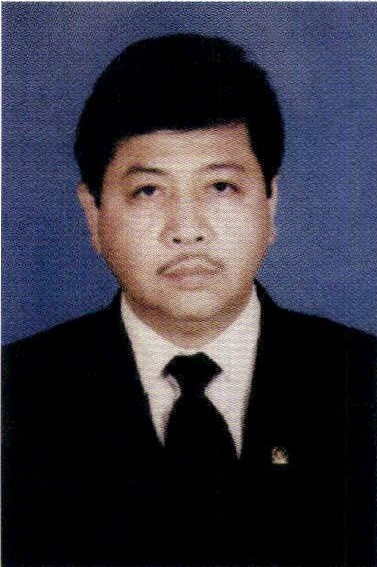
Setya Novanto as MP in 1999.

In 1998, Setya became vice-treasurer of Golkar's central organization, and the following year was elected to the People's Representative Council representing Indonesia-occupied East Timor. He had a difficult year as East Timor voted for independence and he was caught up in a corruption scandal.

In 2004, Setya was re-elected to the legislature as a representative from West Timor. He was re-elected in 2009, representing the same area, and became head of the Golkar Party faction in the legislature. He also became a member of House Commission III, which discusses legal affairs and laws, human rights and security issues.

In 2014, Setya was elected for a fourth time, still representing Timor, and was selected as speaker of Indonesia's House of Representatives by the opposition Koalisi Merah Putih, which initially controlled the parliament. After being caught on tape demanding shares from Freeport Indonesia, Setya resigned as House speaker on 16 December 2015, shortly after a House committee ruled his actions had violated House ethics.

Setya was elected chairman of Golkar Party at its 15–17 May 2016 party conference. He then announced that Golkar was now supporting the government of President Joko 'Jokowi' Widodo, despite having backed Jokowi’s rival, Prabowo Subianto, in the 2014 presidential election. In mid-November 2016, despite having been angered by Setya's use of his name in the demand for Freeport shares, President Jokowi invited Setya to the State Palace for a meeting. Golkar subsequently decided to reinstate Setya as House speaker, and he was officially re-appointed on 30 November 2016.

On 9 December 2017, it was reported that Setya had resigned as House speaker ahead of his corruption trial. He nominated Golkar politician Azis Syamsuddin as his successor. Deputy House Speaker Fadli Zon on 11 December said Setya's resignation had been accepted by a meeting of the House's Deliberation Council but a successor was yet to be selected. Legislators said the House had received Setya's resignation letters on 4 December and 6 December, and the meeting of the Deliberation Council had decided Golkar Party's House faction should handle the matter of a replacement. Golkar on 13 December 2017 replaced Setya with Airlangga Hartarto as party chairman. Setya's replacement in the legislative body was sworn in on 31 October 2018.

== Trump rally ==
In September 2015, Setya visited New York to attend the Fourth World Conference of Speakers of Parliament. He and some fellow Indonesian legislators, including Fadli Zon, then had a half hour business meeting with Donald Trump and joined one of his campaign rallies at Trump Tower in New York. Their presence was arranged by Trump’s Indonesian business partner, Hary Tanoesoedibjo. After appearing to wrap up the rally, Trump returned to the podium with Setya in hand. “Ladies and gentlemen, this is a very, an amazing man,” declared Trump. “He is, as you know, right, Speaker of the House of Indonesia. He’s here to see me. Setya Novantno [sic]. One of the most powerful men and a great man and his whole group is here to see me today and we will do great things for the United States.”

Some Indonesian legislators later demanded sanctions against Setya and Fadli for appearing to take sides in the US presidential election while on an official visit. The pair were investigated by the House Honor Council, but they skipped three ethics hearings. Despite their repeated refusal to attend the hearings, the pair were merely given a reprimand for having publicly endorsed Trump.

== Controversies ==
Setya has been linked to numerous corruption cases but was never prosecuted until December 2017.

=== Bank Bali scandal ===
In 1999, Setya was involved in the Bank Bali scandal. The Indonesian Bank Restructuring Agency (IBRA) in February 1999 colluded with Golkar Party officials to force Bank Bali chief Rudy Ramli to pay a commission of Rp546 billion to Era Giat Prima (EGP) in order to collect Rp904 billion owed by three banks taken over by IBRA. The money was then paid out in more than 150 transfers to top politicians and legislators, partly in an effort to buy votes for the re-election of then-president B.J. Habibie. Setya was the president director of EGP and the deputy treasurer of Golkar, and part of Habibie’s re-election team. After the scandal broke, Setya was not prosecuted. Instead, prosecutors focused on EGP director Djoko Tjandra, an ethnic Chinese Indonesian. An investigation into Setya’s role was terminated by then-attorney general M.A. Rachman, who was known to be close to Golkar Party.

=== Rice smuggling ===
In 2003, Setya's company PT Hexatama Finindo imported 60,000 tons of rice from Vietnam but paid customs duty on only 900 tons after paperwork was allegedly falsified. The case caused state losses of Rp28.5 billion and was examined by the Attorney General’s Office in 2006, but Setya was questioned only once and not prosecuted. Instead, his fellow Golkar legislator, Nurdin Halid, who had ordered the rice, was sentenced to two years and six months in jail.

=== Toxic waste imports ===
In 2004, about 1,000 tons of hazardous waste listed as fertilizer was shipped from Singapore to Indonesia’s Galang Island by PT Asia Pasific Eco Lestari, which was previously owned by Setya. He denied involvement despite reports he was a signatory of the transaction. The incident sparked a diplomatic row with protesters attacking the Singapore Embassy in Jakarta. The company’s director, Rudi Alfonso, received a six-month jail sentence.

=== National Games scandal ===
In 2012, Setya and another Golkar legislator allegedly received Rp9 billion in bribes from the then-governor Riau province, Rusli Zainal, in return for facilitating the release of state budget funds for graft-ridden National Games projects. Rusli was sentenced to 14 years in jail. Setya denied any knowledge of the matter when questioned by the Corruption Eradication Commission (KPK).

=== East Java election fraud ===
In 2014, Setya was linked to a corruption case involving former Constitutional Court chief Akil Mochtar, who was sentenced to life imprisonment for fixing the results of disputed elections. Local media alleged that Setya helped to pay to uphold the victory of Golkar’s candidate in the 2009 East Java gubernatorial election. He denied any involvement.

=== Fuel depot ===
In 2015, Setya sent a letter demanding that state oil and gas company Pertamina pay allegedly inflated costs for use of a fuel terminal, PT Orbit Terminal Merak, owned by his crony, oil trade kingpin Mohammad Riza Chalid.

=== Freeport shares ===
In June 2015, in one of the biggest corruption scandals in the history of Indonesia, Setya was recorded by Freeport Indonesia President-Director Maroef Sjamsoeddin allegedly attempting to extort 20 percent of shares (worth USD 4 billion) in the company in exchange for an extension of its contract to manage the Grasberg mine in Papua. He claimed to be acting for President Joko Widodo and Vice President Jusuf Kalla. He also mentioned the name of then-presidential chief-of-staff Luhut Binsar Panjaitan during phone calls with Sjamsoeddin. Setya later claimed this request for shares was only a joke. Both Maroef and Indonesian Energy minister Sudirman Said, gave testimony to a House Ethics Panel set up to investigate the allegations against Setya, who subsequently reported Sudirman Said to the police for defamation. The proceedings were televised live and attracted a large audience. Setya resigned as House speaker on 16 December 2015 shortly before the committee voted to dismiss him. The Attorney General's Office began an investigation into the case, but it was never completed. Setya subsequently petitioned the Constitutional Court for a review of the Electronic Information and Transactions Law. The court ruled that only recordings made by law enforcement officials were admissible as evidence in court. Therefore, as Maroef was a private individual, the recording he made could not be used to prosecute Setya.

== Electronic ID card (E-KTP) scandal ==
In 2013, Setya was accused of demanding a 10 percent fee from the owner of a company that won a contract to produce electronic ID cards. He denied the charges. On 10 April 2017, the KPK banned Setya from leaving Indonesia for six months after linking him to the case. The following day, KPK investigator Novel Baswedan was blinded in one eye in an acid attack. Setya urged the public not to jump to conclusions. He claimed the attack was not only against Novel and KPK, but against "us, the Indonesian people and nation fighting against corruption".

In July 2017, the KPK named Setya a suspect in the Rp2.3 trillion electronic ID card corruption case. On 4 September 2017, Setya filed a pretrial motion with South Jakarta District Court to challenge his status as a corruption suspect. He was summoned by KPK for interrogation on 11 September 2017 but failed to appear on the grounds of poor health. A team of doctors from the House of Representatives examined him the following day and claimed he was suffering vertigo as a result of playing ping-pong. On 27 September 2017, a plenary meeting of Golkar recommended he be temporarily suspended as party chairman because his status as a corruption suspect had harmed the party. On 29 September 2017, South Jakarta District Court accepted Setya's pretrial motion and rescinded his status as a suspect. In response, the KPK on 31 October again named him a suspect in the case. Setya's lawyer said he would seek protection from the president, the military and the police, if the KPK tries to summon his client. He asserted that under Indonesia's constitution, members of parliament have immunity and cannot be touched.

=== 2017 staged car crash ===
On 15 November 2017, Setya failed to appear at KPK's office for questioning and instead attended a plenary meeting of the House of Representatives. KPK officers went to his Jakarta residence at 9.38pm with a warrant for his arrest, but he was not at home and was later declared a fugitive.

According to his lawyer, Fredrich Yunadi, Setya was outside Jakarta and returned on 16 November to the House of Representatives, where he called a Metro TV reporter, Hilman Mattauch, to come and interview him. A subsequent interview, relayed via a telephone call to Metro TV, was reportedly conducted in a black Toyota Fortuner vehicle owned and driven by Hilman. The two were accompanied in the car by Setya's aide, Reza, who is a senior police inspector. During the interview, Setya denied any wrongdoing and said he was being oppressed by KPK, so he was seeking another judicial review and asking the president for legal protection. According to his lawyer, Setya then requested to be driven to the KPK office to comply with its summons, but Hilman wanted to take him to Metro TV studios. During the drive, the vehicle mounted a sidewalk alongside a canal on Permata Hijau Street and reportedly scraped the side of a tree before hitting a power pole. An unidentified vehicle stopped and took Setya to Medika Permata Hijau Hospital. Hilman and Reza, who were seated in the front of the vehicle, were not injured. Setya's lawyer told reporters that Setya was unconscious and seriously injured, sustaining a lump the size of a bakpao (steamed bun) to his head and bleeding. Police later examined the car and found no traces of blood. An investigation found the car was traveling at 50 km/h on the street but had slowed to 21 km/h when it hit the power pole.

Golkar Party official Mahyudin, who visited Setya at the hospital on 17 November, denied Setya had sustained a bakpao-sized lump to the head. He said there was bruising to his left temple and a scratch on his left cheek. He said Setya told him he had intended to meet some Golkar officials at Jakarta's Mandarin Hotel so they could accompany him to the KPK office, but then the car accident occurred.

Police said Hilman claimed the accident occurred because he was tired and had been talking on his phone and talking to Setya. On 17 November, Setya was transferred to Cipto Mangunkusumo Hospital. His lawyer claimed that if Setya were not evacuated to Singapore for treatment, he could lose his memory. Many Indonesian netizens ridiculed the "accident" by sharing memes that expressed sympathy for the power pole. The Indonesian media also ran mocking headlines, such as TRIBUNews.com's "Here's the Clarification from the Electricity Pole that was the Victim of Setya Novanto's Car Collision".

Police declared Hilman a suspect for negligent driving. Hilman had served as Coordinator of Parliamentary Journalists from 2014-2016, a position that enabled him to become close to Setya. Fredrich rejected rumors that Setya had given Hilman an apartment and a car, saying, “If he's a girl maybe yes, unfortunately he's a guy, a fat guy, so who would want him, right?”

=== Arrest, second pre-trial motion ===
On 17 November 2017, KPK announced it had officially arrested Setya as a suspect in the E-KTP scandal. His lawyer said a "sick" person should not be arrested. On 19 November, he was transferred to the KPK detention center after doctors ruled him fit for questioning. He arrived in a wheelchair but was walking normally after his initial questioning. He was detained in a KPK cell measuring 2.5 x 5 meters, where his two cellmates were Rochmadi Saptogiri of the State Audit Agency and businessman Sujendi Tarsono alias Ayen. Rochmadi said Setya, like most new inmates, found it difficult to sleep for the first two nights.

After his arrest, Setya wrote a letter to the House of Representatives, asking to be allowed to keep his position while he attempts to prove his innocence. He also wrote a letter to Golkar, nominating Idrus Marham as acting party chairman. The deputy chairman of South Jakarta District Court, Judge Kusno, on 14 December 2017 rejected Setya's second pre-trial motion to have his suspect status revoked, on the grounds that Setya's corruption trial had started the previous day, rendering the pre-trial motion legally void.

=== Corruption trial and sentencing ===
On 13 December 2017, Setya appeared as a defendant at Jakarta Corruption Court. He initially refused to respond when the presiding judge asked him to identify himself. The hearing was adjourned for several hours pending a medical examination after a defense lawyer claimed Setya was sick. KPK prosecutors said Setya was lying and only pretending to be ill. The trial resumed later that day with the reading of indictment, in which Setya was accused of receiving Rp300 billion and a $135,000 wristwatch in bribes from members of a consortium that won a tender for the E-KTP project.

Less than a week before the trial started, two of Setya's senior defense lawyers resigned, citing differences of opinion.

In January 2018, Setya's lawyer stated his client's intention to become a justice collaborator. By March, he had returned Rp 5 billion (USD 350,000) and named other alleged recipients of E-KTP project bribes, including Central Java Governor Ganjar Pranowo and cabinet members Puan Maharani and Pramono Anung. On 29 March, prosecutors recommended he be jailed for 16 years and fined Rp 1 billion.

On 24 April 2018, Jakarta Corruption Court convicted Setya of corruption and sentenced him to 15 years in jail. He was also ordered to pay a fine of Rp 500 million or have his sentence extended by three months. Judges said he was proven to have committed corruption in the budgeting and tender processes for the electronic ID project over 2011-2013. Judges said Setya was spared a heavier sentence because he was polite during the trial and had never been convicted before. Judges barred him from public office for five years after his sentence expires.

=== Imprisonment ===
In September 2018, Indonesia's National Ombudsman found that Setya was enjoying special treatment at Bandung's Sukamiskin prison, including a cell twice the size of regular cells. In June 2019, Setya was allowed to visit Bandung's Santosa Hospital, where he had a room on the 8th floor. On 14 June, he left the hospital and was later seen at a shopping center with his wife in West Bandung. The Justice and Human Rights Ministry responded by transferring him from Sukamiskin prison to Gunung Sindur prison in Bogor. On 14 July 2019, he was transferred back to Sukamiskin after meeting various "administrative requirements" and promising not to repeat his actions. On 12 August 2019, Setya was sporting a beard and moustache when he testified at Jakarta Corruption Court as a witness in a power project corruption case. He joked that he had grown the beard because the other inmates at Gunung Sindur "are all terrorists". In December 2019, Emerson Yuntho, a former coordinator of Indonesian Corruption Watch, claimed Setya had again gone missing from his cell. A prison official denied that Setya had left the jail for medical treatment, insisting he was in good health, while the Justice Ministry said Setya had been moved to another room because his cell was being repaired and the work would not be completed until 31 December. On 26 December 2019, Setya was transferred to Jakarta's Cipinang prison, officially because he required treatment at Gatot Subroto Army Hospital in Jakarta. A Justice Ministry official said Setya's heart rhythm required examination and he would be sent back to Sukamiskin prison upon recovery. National Ombudsman official Ninik Rahayu made a surprise visit to Cipinang jail on 29 December 2019 and found the jail's luxury block was registered in the name of Setya, who was not there. Ninik questioned why Setya had a special "very comfortable" cell with "better facilities" when the jail is not supposed to discriminate against inmates. Cipinang Prison head Hendra Eka Putra explained the special block is for prisoners with heart disease and infectious diseases, so it was impossible to allow other inmates there. He said Setya had arrived at the jail at 8am on 26 December and then at 10am went directly to hospital, so he had not yet had time to stay at the jail. He said Setya qualified for the special block because he had heart disease and complications of several other diseases.

=== Supreme Court Appeal ===
On 6 January 2020, Setya filed for a judicial review of his sentence at the Supreme Court. Indonesia Corruption Watch said the panel of three justices handling the review, led by justice Surya Jaya, should reject the appeal if no new evidence is submitted.

=== Lawyer and doctor jailed ===
On 28 June 2018, Setya's lawyer Fredrich was sentenced to seven years in prison for obstruction of justice because he conspired for Setya to be hospitalized after the staged car accident. The lawyer's appeal was rejected by the Supreme Court, which extended his sentence by six months. In March 2020, Fredrich filed a lawsuit at South Jakarta District Court, demanding Setya and his wife pay legal fees and interest amounting to Rp27 billion and non-material losses of Rp 2.256 trillion.

On 16 July 2018, Setya's doctor, Bimanesh Sutarjo of private hospital Medika Permata Hijau, was sentenced to three years in jail for obstructing the KPK investigation.

== Memes and defamation allegation ==
Setya’s links to corruption cases resulted in him becoming the subject of numerous internet memes, shared widely on social media. On 10 October 2017, Setya's lawyer, Fredrich Yunadi, reported 32 social media accounts to police for allegedly defaming and slandering his client. The accounts comprised 15 Twitter accounts, 9 Instagram accounts and 8 Facebook accounts. Among those reported to police was Dyann Kemala Arrizzqi, who had uploaded memes of Setya to her Instagram account. On 31 October, police arrested Dyann at her house in Tangerang, Banten province. She was charged under Indonesia’s Information and Electronic Transactions Law, as well as Articles 310 and 311 of the Indonesian Criminal Code. She was released the following day but remained under investigation and faced up to six years in jail.

Fredrich on 1 November 2017 complained there were at least 60 memes mocking his client. He suspected a “certain party” had ordered or paid for the memes to discredit Setya. He urged the public to uphold the presumption of innocence and cease spreading hatred and slander against Setya. He said Setya’s position as House of Representatives speaker is equal to that of the president, so he should not be mocked.

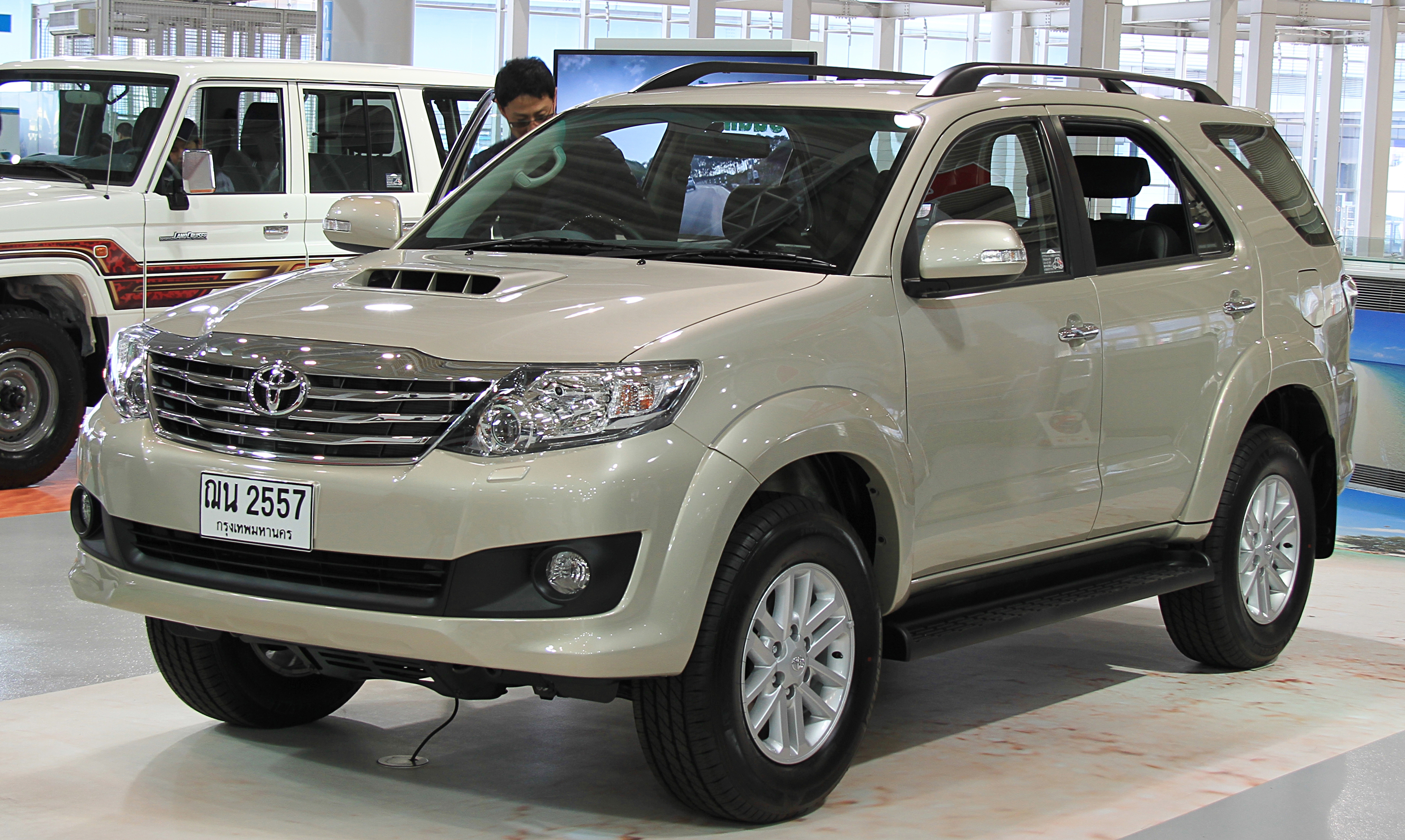
A 2014 Toyota Fortuner, similar to that one Novanto drove.

After Setya's disappearance on 15 November 2017 and his subsequent hospitalization following a car crash, Indonesian social media and news media published more memes ridiculing him. Fredrich said his subordinates were evaluating the memes and he would report offending social media accounts to police.

== Novanto Center ==
In 2009, Setya founded the Novanto Center, an institution that carries out social, economic and community activities in East Nusa Tenggara, one of Indonesia's poorest provinces. The center has provided basic food commodities, scholarships and cash handouts, and sponsored mass circumcisions.

Local activists claim the Novanto Center facilitated the entry of an iron ore mining company, PT Laki Tangguh, which was in 2013 reported to police for alleged fraud and crimes.

In 2014, the director of the Novanto Center in Kupang, Muhammad Ansor, allegedly threatened a Tempo reporter, Yohanes Seo, for writing an article that listed some of Setya’s business investments in East Nusa Tenggara (NTT). After interviewing Ansor, who is a local legislator for Golkar Party, Seo wrote an article headlined ‘The Business Octopus of Setya Novanto in NTT’. The reporter says he then received a phone call from Ansor, warning him that his family would come looking for him. Ansor denied making any threats, but complained the reporter had twisted his information.

In 2015, the Novanto Center established a weaving, poultry breeding and cattle fattening business in Manusak village. Locals say Setya stopped visiting the project in 2015, so all of the livestock and weaving looms were stolen or sold, leaving the buildings empty.

== Personal life ==
Setya was married to Luciana Lily Herliyanti, the daughter of former West Java Police chief Brigadier General Sudharsono. The couple had two children, Rheza Herwindo and Dwina Michaella. Setya and Lily later divorced. Setya is now married to Deisti Astriani and they have two children, Gavriel Putranto and Giovanno Farell.

Political offices
Preceded by Ade Komarudin	Speaker of the House of Representatives; 2016–2017	Succeeded by Fadli Zon (acting); Bambang Soesatyo
Preceded by Marzuki Alie	Speaker of the House of Representatives; 2014–2015	Succeeded by Fadli Zon (acting); Ade Komarudin
