= Zainudin Amali =

Indonesian politician (born 1962)

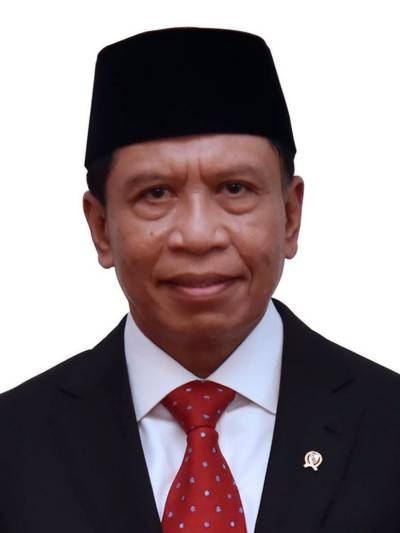
- Official portrait, 2019

Vice Chairman of the Football Association of Indonesia
- Incumbent
- Assumed office 16 February 2023 Serving with Ratu Tisha
- Chair: Erick Thohir
- Preceded by: Cucu Sumantri; Iwan Budianto

13th Minister of Youth and Sports
- In office 23 October 2019 – 13 March 2023
- President: Joko Widodo
- Preceded by: Imam Nahrawi; Hanif Dhakiri (interim)
- Succeeded by: Muhadjir Effendy (interim); Dito Ariotedjo

Member of the People's Representative Council
- In office 1 October 2004 – 23 October 2019
- Succeeded by: Muhammad Ali Ridha
- Constituency: Gorontalo (2004–2009); East Java VI (2009–2014); East Java XI (2014–2019)

Personal details
- Born: 16 March 1962 (age 64) Luhu, Gorontalo, Indonesia
- Party: Golkar
- Spouse: Nadiah Al-Hamid
- Children: 1

Zainudin Amali (born 16 March 1962) is an Indonesian politician. From October 2019 to March 2023, he served as Minister of Youth and Sport in the 41st Cabinet of Indonesia. He resigned from the position to focus on football governance because he was elected as one of the Vice-chairs of PSSI, Indonesia's football governing body. Concurrent with his position in PSSI, he was also chosen as the main commissioner of PT Liga Indonesia Baru, the operator of PSSI's competitions, in June 2023.

== Early life and education ==
Zainudin born in Gorontalo in 1962 to Mohammad Amali, a local cleric, and Maryam Hala. He spent his elementary school in his village elementary school, Buhu Elementary School (now Talaga Jaya 4 State Elementary School), but later moved to Manado to house of his relative to continue study at State Junior High School No. 1 Manado and Senior High School No. 4 Manado. As his father was a popular and renowned cleric, he expected his son to follow his way to become a preacher and forced him to enroll a Religious Teacher Education Program (forerunner of now Islamic University), but Zainudin resisted and caused him to flee home near the completion of his Senior High. Eventually, with support of his relatives, his parents accepted Zainudin decision and let Zainudin to choose his higher education.

He later moved to Jakarta for continuing his study to higher education. He later enrolled to Jakarta Banking and Accountancy Academy (now Perbanas Institute), graduating in 1986. He later got his second bachelor's in economics from Swadaya School of Economics in 1992. He got his master's degree in Public Policies from Prof. Dr. Moestopo University "Beragama" in 2016. He eventually got his doctoral degree in Government Administration from Institute of Home Affairs Governance in 2019.

== Activism ==
During his undergraduate years, he joined the Muslim Students' Association and become member of its journalism wing, the Islamic Student Press Institute in 1986-1987. He later switched to the Golkar affiliated student organization, Gema Kosgoro (Union of Mutual Cooperation Multifunction Organizations, Students Movement) and later Angkatan Muda Partai Golkar (Golkar Party Young Force) in 1990s.

== Businesses Career ==
During he took his second bachelor's degree, he became a realtor and joined Indonesian Real Estate Association and eventually became its vice general secretary. He later joined and worked for various companies offering services in directorial and commissioner posts before eventually committed to the politics fulltime in 2001–2002.

== Political Career and DPR ==
As a Golkar cadre, he was elected as congressman representing three electoral regions, Gorontalo (2004–2009), East Java VI (Kediri, Blitar, Tulungagung, Kediri City, and Blitar City) (2014–2019), and East Java XI (Bangkalan, Sampang, Pamekasan, and Sumenep) (2019–2024). When he elected from East Java XI region, he briefly become Leader of the Golkar Faction in the People's Representative Council (DPR) for only one month, before being recruited by Joko Widodo as the Minister of Youth and Sports in his second administration.

The intention to hold the National Conference (Munas) of the Executive Board of the Indonesian Archery Association (PB Perpani) on 19 December 2022, in Jakarta was appreciated and welcomed by Zainudin, Minister of Youth and Sports. According to Illiza Sa'aduddin Djamal, she informed him about the initiatives and successes she had carried out while serving as manager.

== Tenure as Minister and Appointment as Professor ==
As minister, he promoted the advance of sport development and sport policies, which were largely undeveloped prior his tenure. For his works in developing sport policies in Indonesia and promoting the rapid advancement of Indonesian sports during his tenure, State University of Semarang awarded him honorary professorship in 2022.

== Personal life ==
He is married to Nadiah Alhamid, an Arab-Indonesian, and the couple has one child named Safira.

He is affiliated with Nahdlatul Ulama.
