= Ade Komarudin =

Indonesian politician

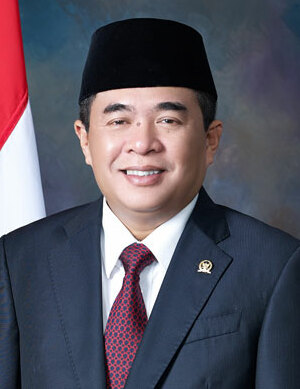
- Official portrait, 2016

17th Speaker of the House of Representatives
- In office 11 January 2016 – 30 November 2016
- Preceded by: Setya Novanto; Fadli Zon (acting)
- Succeeded by: Setya Novanto

Member of House of Representatives
- In office 1 October 1997 – 30 September 2019
- Constituency: West Java (1997–2004); West Java VI (2004–2009); West Java VII (2009–2019)

Personal details
- Born: 20 May 1965 (age 61) Purwakarta, Indonesia
- Party: Golkar
- Spouse: Netty Marliza
- Children: 3, including Puteri Anetta Komarudin
- Parents: Thoha Mukhtar (father); Nurhayati (mother)
- Education: Syarif Hidayatullah State Islamic University Jakarta; Padjadjaran University
- Occupation: Politician; legislator

Ade Komarudin (born 20 May 1965) is an Indonesian politician, who served as a representative from 1997 to 2019. His daughter, Puteri Anetta Komarudin, is also a politician.

== Career ==
Ade Komarudin was born on 20 May 1965 in Purwakarta, West Java.

He was first elected to the house of representatives in 1997 as a member of the Golkar party. In January 2016, Komarudin was appointed the speaker of the house of representatives succeeding Fadli Zon. Komarudin's term as representative ended in September 2019.

== Ethics ==
In November 2016 the Indonesian honorary court dismissed Komarudin as the speaker of the house because he was found guilty of ethics violations, relating to the misuse of power to influence deliberations of the legislature.

In September 2018 the Indonesian supreme court found that Komarudin was involved a case involving corruption linked to an electronic identity card project, e-KTP, along with other defendants.

Political offices
| Preceded by Setya Novanto; Fadli Zon (acting) | Speaker of the House of Representatives; 2016 | Succeeded by Setya Novanto |
