= Suara Hidayatullah =

Indonesian muslim magazine

- Categories: Muslim magazine
- Frequency: Monthly
- First issue: May 1988
- Company: PT Lentera Jaya Abadi
- Country: Indonesia
- Based in: Surabaya
- Language: Indonesian
- Website: majalahhidayatullah.com
- ISSN: 0863-2367

Suara Hidayatullah was an Indonesian Muslim monthly magazine.

== History ==
It was first published in 1988.

Suara Hidayatullah Magazine contains issues and dynamics of preaching, both in Indonesia and the world. It contains columns of interviews with famous figures, studies of the Qur'an and Hadith, stories of the heroism of preachers' struggles in various corners of the country, and family problems.
