= Bambang Soesatyo =

Indonesian politician and businessman

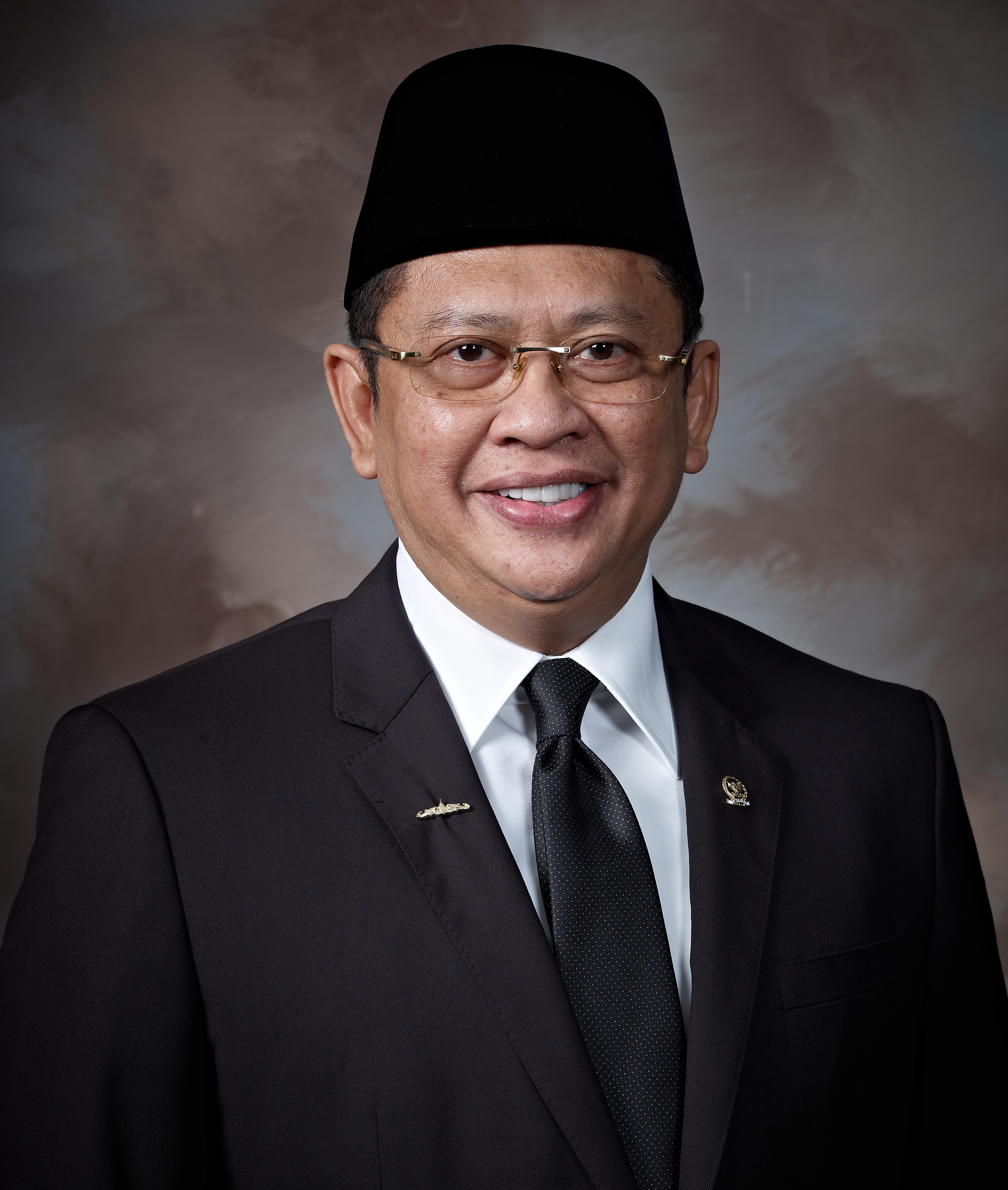
- Official portrait, 2019

15th Speaker of the People's Consultative Assembly
- In office 3 October 2019 – 30 September 2024
- Preceded by: Zulkifli Hasan
- Succeeded by: Ahmad Muzani

18th Speaker of the House of Representatives
- In office 15 January 2018 – 30 September 2019
- Preceded by: Setya Novanto; Fadli Zon (acting)
- Succeeded by: Puan Maharani

Member of House of Representatives
- Incumbent
- Assumed office 1 October 2009
- Constituency: Central Java VII
- Majority: 90,321 (6.7%)

Personal details
- Born: 10 September 1962 (age 64) Jakarta, Indonesia
- Party: Golkar
- Spouse: Lenny Sri Mulyani
- Education: Jayabaya University; Open University; Padjadjaran University
- Occupation: Politician; journalist; businessperson
- Website: bambangsoesatyo.info
- Nickname: Bamsoet

Bambang Soesatyo (born 10 September 1962), more colloquially referred to as Bamsoet, is an Indonesian politician and businessman, who served as the 15th speaker of the People's Consultative Assembly between 2019 and 2024, and as a member of the House of Representatives since 2009. A member of Golkar, he previously served as the 18th speaker of the House of Representatives following the resignation of Setya Novanto.

== Early life and education ==
=== Family ===
Bambang Soesatyo was born in Jakarta, Indonesia, on 10 September 1962. He was raised in a military family, and grew up in a military dormitory. His father, S.E. Prijono, was a soldier who came from Semarang.

=== Education ===
Bambang began his early education by enrolling at SD Negeri VIII (the equivalent of primary school), graduating in 1975. He then attended middle school at SMP Negeri 49 and graduated in 1978. He then pursued his secondary education majoring in science at SMA Negeri 14, Jakarta, and graduated in 1981.

After finishing his secondary education, he enrolled at the Jayabaya Accounting University and graduated from there in 1985. During his time in Jayabaya, he chaired the University's Student Senate (OSIS). Following his graduation in 1985, he completed a pre-MBA course at the Institute for Management Education and Development (IPPM), before attaining a degree in public administration from Indonesia Open University in 1988.

He obtained a degree in corporate management from the Indonesian College of Economics in 1992 after completing his MBA at Newport Management Institute of Indonesia in 1990.

== Professional career ==
Bambang took a job in a public accountancy office in 1984 but became an editor the following year and a journalist by 1986. He later worked in a financial department doing electronic data processing before returning to publishing, becoming a marketing manager of the Vista magazine until 1992. He also took up a one-year position as a lecturer between 1991 and 1992. After becoming editor-in-chief of Info Bisnis and Suara Karya, he became a director of a timber company and served as a commissioner at several other corporations.

== Early political career ==
During his studies, he was active in student organizations, including the Indonesian Youth Renewal Generation (Indonesian: Angkatan Muda Pembaharuan Indonesia), and was affiliated with Golkar, which was then the ruling political party of President Suharto.

== House of Representatives ==
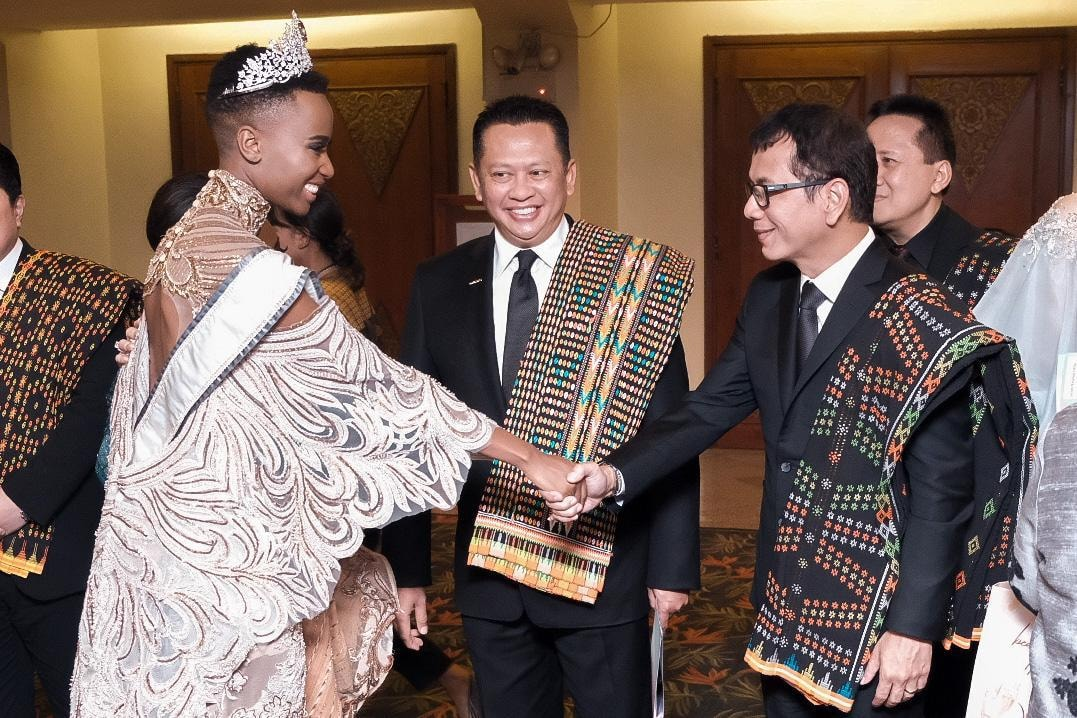
Soesatyo together with Miss Universe 2019-Zozibini Tunzi and Minister of Tourism and Creative Economy of The Republic of Indonesia-Wishnutama Kusubandio.

After failing to gain a seat four times (including in 1997, 1999, and 2004), Bambang secured a seat in the House of Representatives following the 2009 elections where he had run in Central Java's 7th electoral district—covering the regencies of Purbalingga, Banjar, and Kebumen. Upon his inauguration, he was assigned to Commission III on Law, Human Rights, and Security. Later, he was part of a special committee investigating a controversial Rp 6.7 trillion bailout for Bank Century, given during the 2008 financial crisis, which involved finance minister Sri Mulyani Indrawati and later Vice President Boediono.

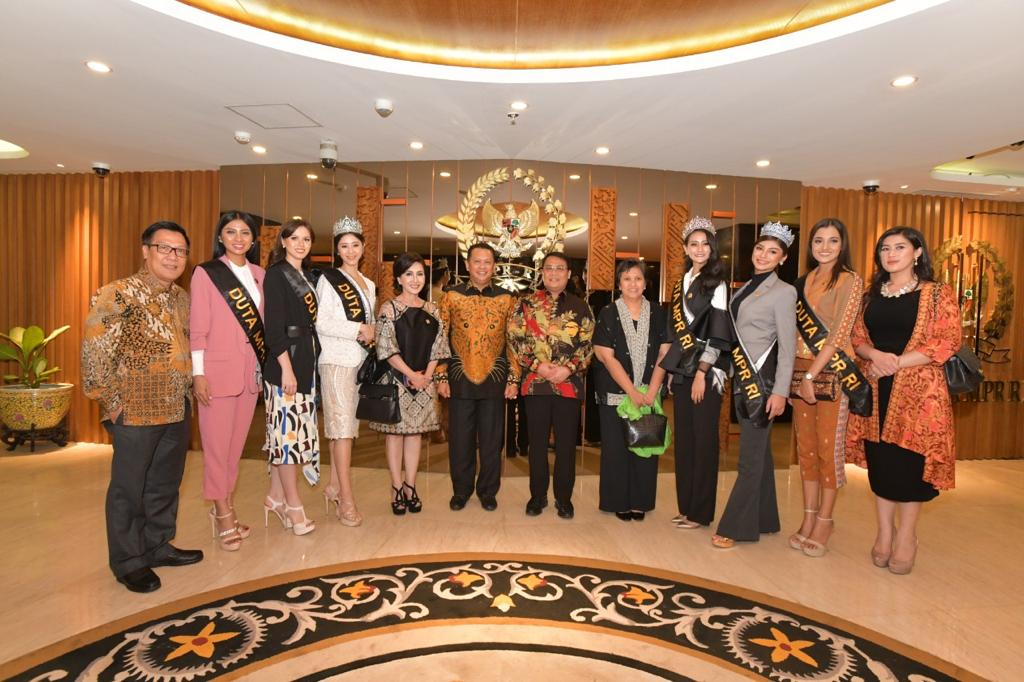
Soesatyo elected Puteri Indonesia 2020 as the Indonesian People's Consultative Assembly Ambassador on 12 March 2020.

In 2014, Bambang stood for re-election in the election and received 57,235 votes, making him the only candidate from the district affiliated with Golkar. He blamed vote buying as a reason for Golkar's declining votes. By January 2016, internal changes in Golkar resulted in him being assigned as Chairman of Commission III. Bambang was also a member of a special committee (Panitia Khusus/Pansus) for the Corruption Eradication Commission (KPK), seen by many observers as an attempt to restrict the anti-graft body's powers.

Bambang called for the sacking of the chairman of the Audit Board of Indonesia in 2016 when the body's investigation into a hospital purchase by the Jakarta Provincial Government was contradicted by the Corruption Eradication Commission (KPK) which found no violations. In 2017, as part of a committee investigating KPK, he stated that the body exhibited internal friction and insubordination to its leadership.

He called for the expansion of regulations against homosexuality in Indonesia, blaming online social media for the spread of LGBT groups and claiming that 3 percent of the population would be gay without citing his source. Bambang also called for the Indonesian National Police and the Indonesian State Intelligence Agency to prosecute provocateurs and hoax propagators on social media.

Bambang was reelected for a fourth term in the 2024 election with 80,468 votes.

=== Speakership (2018–2019) ===
After being implicated in a $170 million graft scandal, Setya Novanto resigned as Golkar chairman and parliament speaker in late 2017. Golkar's new chairman, Airlangga Hartarto, appointed Bambang as the new parliament speaker and he was sworn in on 15 January 2018. Fellow Golkar parliamentarian Kahar Muzakir replaced him as head of Commission III. While some analysts praised Bambang's appointment based on his seniority and political experience, others cited a possible conflict of interest due to his involvement in the special committee conducting an inquiry into KPK. However, Bambang resigned from the special committee after he was sworn in.

== People's Consultative Assembly ==
=== Speakership (2019–present) ===
Bambang was in October 2019 elected by acclamation Speaker of the People's Consultative Assembly (MPR). In August 2020, he proposed legalizing ownership of 9-millimeter pistols and ammunition for self-defense.

== Personal life ==
Bambang is married to Lenny Sri and has eight children. He collects luxury vehicles including a Tesla Model X, which he reported in 2016 as two Harley-Davidson motorcycles and ten cars, valued at Rp 18 billion (about US$1.35 million), compared to his total reported assets of Rp 62 billion (US$4.66 million).

== Controversy ==
Bambang has been one of the key witnesses to be questioned by the Corruption Eradication Commission (KPK) in the high-profile investigation of the rigged procurement of the e-ID project worth Rp 5.9 trillion (US$436 million) project, thus causing Rp 2.3 trillion in state losses. He is one of the five former and current lawmakers as witnesses in relation to two suspects in the case, namely businessmen Made Oka Masagung and Irvanto Hendra Pambudi – the latter is also the nephew of ex-House of Representatives speaker and graft convict Setya Novanto.

In 2013, Indonesian businessman Muhammad Nazaruddin upon investigation by Corruption Eradication Commission (KPK) had named two Golkar Party politicians Aziz Syamsudin and Bambang Soesatyo and the Indonesian Democratic Party of Struggle (PDIP) in Commission III of the House of Representatives, who were supposed to be involved in the alleged corruption procurement simulators of two and four-wheeled driving licenses at the Traffic Corps of Police Headquarters of fiscal year 2011. The state has reportedly lost around Rp 100 billion (US$10 million) in this Rp 198.7 billion procurement fraud case. Bambang has denied all allegations.

Bambang has been embroiled in a land theft case with the professed victim named Vita Setyan who has filed a criminal complaint against him for illegally grabbing her land in Banjar Tegal Besar in Klungkung Regency, Bali. Bambang owns a villa adjacent to the conflicted piece of land. Bambang to date has refuted all allegations and has pledged to take necessary actions against the plaintiff.

== Honours ==
- Indonesia
  - Star of Mahaputera, (2nd Class) (Indonesian: Bintang Mahaputera Adipradana) (2024)
  - Star of Service, (1st Class) (Indonesian: Bintang Jasa Utama) (2020)

Political offices
Preceded by Zulkifli Hasan	Speaker of the People's Consultative Assembly; 2019–2024	Succeeded by Ahmad Muzani
Preceded by Setya Novanto; Fadli Zon (acting)	Speaker of the House of Representatives; 2018–2019	Succeeded by Puan Maharani
