= Golkar =

Political party in Indonesia

Party of Functional Groups Partai Golongan Karya
- Abbreviation: Golkar
- General Chairman: Bahlil Lahadalia
- Secretary-General: Muhammad Sarmuji
- DPR group leader: Muhammad Sarmuji
- Founders: Suharto; Suhardiman; Djuhartono
- Founded: 20 October 1964 (62 years, 12 days)
- Headquarters: Jl. Anggrek Neli Murni No. 11A Kel. Kemanggisan, Kec. Palmerah, West Jakarta, Jakarta 11480
- Newspaper: Suara Karya (1971–2016)
- Youth wing: AMPI (Young Force of Indonesian Renewal); AMPG (Golkar Party Young Force)
- Women's wing: KPPG (Golkar Party Women's Corps)
- Labour's wing: KSPSI; SOKSI; KORPRI (1971–1999)
- Membership (2024): 832,842
- Ideology: Pancasila; Conservatism; National conservatism; Developmentalism; Pancasila economics; Economic liberalism; Indonesian nationalism Faction: Ultranationalism Historical: Anti-communism Authoritarianism Expansionist nationalism
- Political position: Catch-all; Majority: Centre to centre-right; Faction: Right-wing (Note: Golkar is generally a centre to centre-right secular party, but the party still has right-wing factions described as New Order revivalist. During the New Order, Golkar was described as right-wing to far-right.); Historical: Right-wing to far-right
- National affiliation: Advanced Indonesia Coalition Former: United Indonesia Coalition; (2022–2023); Onward Indonesia Coalition; (2018–2022); Great Indonesia Coalition; (2015, 2016–2018); Red-White Coalition; (2014–2015, 2016); Joint Secretariat; (2009–2014); JK-Wiranto (Golkar Coalition); (2009); National Coalition; (2004–2005)
- International affiliation: For the Freedom of Nations!
- Colours: Yellow
- Slogan: Suara Golkar, Suara Rakyat (Golkar's Voice, People's Voice)
- Anthem: Hymne Partai Golkar (Golkar Party Hymn); Mars Partai Golkar) (Golkar Party March)
- Ballot number: 4
- DPR: 102 / 580 (18%)
- DPRD I: 365 / 2,372 (15%)
- DPRD II: 2,521 / 17,510 (14%)

Website
- www.partaigolkar.com

The Party of Functional Groups (Indonesian: Partai Golongan Karya, Indonesian pronunciation: ['partaɪ ɡoˈloŋan ˈkarja]), often known by its abbreviation Golkar (Indonesian: [ˈɡolkar]), is a centre to centre-right big tent secular-nationalist political party in Indonesia. Founded in 1964 as the Joint Secretariat of Functional Groups (Sekretariat Bersama Golongan Karya, Sekber Golkar), it is the oldest extant political party in Indonesia. It first participated in national elections in 1971 as Functional Groups. Since 2009, it has been the second-largest party in the House of Representatives (DPR), having won 102 seats in the latest election.

Golkar served as the ruling political organisation during the New Order era under Suharto from 1971 to 1999, when it was formally reconstituted as a political party to participate in elections. Throughout this period, it held far-right political positions, maintained a de facto one-party state and supported Suharto's authoritarian rule. Following the Fall of Suharto in 1998, the party's dominance weakened, and its share of votes declined in the subsequent legislative election. Golkar then joined the governing coalitions of Presidents Abdurrahman Wahid and Megawati Sukarnoputri.

The party regained its position as the largest party in the DPR after winning the 2004 legislative election, and its member Jusuf Kalla was elected as vice president. In 2009, Golkar nominated Kalla for president, but he was defeated by the incumbent Susilo Bambang Yudhoyono (SBY). When Joko Widodo (Jokowi) was elected president in 2014, Golkar initially joined the opposing coalition led by Prabowo Subianto, but in 2016, switched its allegiance to the Jokowi administration.

In 2024, Golkar finished second in the legislative election and gained 102 seats, the party's best performance following a trend of declining seats since 2009. The party also remains in government as part of the governing Advanced Indonesia Coalition. For 53 years, Golkar has continued to be in government, whether it be as the sole ruling party, or as a junior coalition partner.

== History ==
=== Origins ===
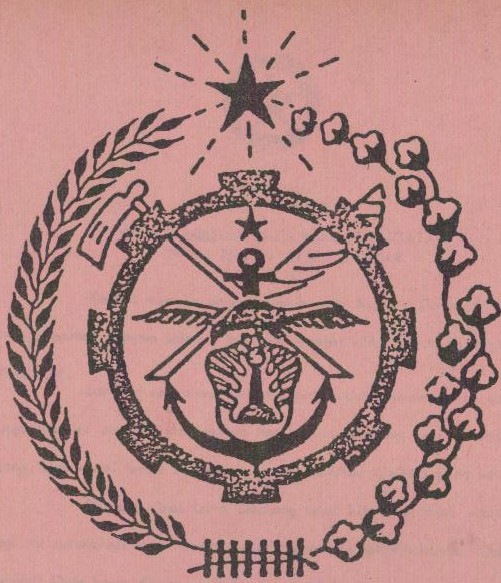
Logo of the Joint Secretariat of Functional Groups (Sekber Golkar)

In 1959, President Sukarno introduced his concept of Guided Democracy, in which so-called functional groups would play a role in government in place of political parties. The Indonesian National Armed Forces supported its creation because it believed these groups would balance the growing strength of the Communist Party of Indonesia (PKI). In 1960, Sukarno awarded sectoral groups such as teachers, the Armed Forces and the Indonesian National Police, workers and artists seats in the Mutual Cooperation House of Representatives. As some of the members of these functional groups were linked to political parties, this gave political influence to the National Armed Forces and by extension the National Police. The TNI then established an anti-PKI trade union, the Central Organization of Indonesian Workers, or Soksi (Sentral Organisasi Karyawan Swadiri Indonesia), and used this as the core of an Armed Forces-led Joint Secretariat of Functional Groups, or Sekber Golkar, which was officially established on 20 October 1964. By 1968 there were almost 250 organizations under the Sekber umbrella. On 22 November 1969 they were organized into seven main organizations, or Kino (Kelompok Induk Organisasi), namely Soksi, Kosgoro (Union of Mutual Cooperation Multifunction Organizations), MKGR (Mutual Assistance Families Association), Gerakan Karya Rakyat (People's Working Movement), Ormas Hankam (Defense and Security Mass Organizations), Professi (professional organizations), and Gerakan Pembangunan (Development Movement). The Joint Secretariat was one of those organisations moblized against the PKI in the aftermath of the failure of the 30 September Movement in 1965.

=== Suharto and Golkar ===
In March 1968, General Suharto was officially elected by the People's Consultative Assembly (MPR) as Indonesia's second president. Because of his military background, Suharto was not affiliated with any political parties. Suharto had never expressed much interest in party politics. However, if he were to be elected for a second term as president, he needed to align himself with a political party. Originally, Suharto had shown interest in aligning with the Indonesian National Party (PNI), the party of his predecessor, Sukarno. But in seeking to distance himself from the old regime, Suharto settled on Golkar.

Suharto then ordered his closest associate, Ali Murtopo, to transform Golkar and turn it into an electoral machine. Under Murtopo, and with Suharto's supervision, Golkar was turned from a federation of NGOs into a political party. Under Suharto, Golkar continued to portray itself as a non-ideological entity, without favoritism or political agendas. It promised to focus on "economic development" and "stability" rather than a specific ideological goal. Golkar also began identifying itself with the government, encouraging civil servants to vote for it as a sign of loyalty to the government.

Murtopo claimed that workers were a functional group, which by rights ought to be subsumed under Golkar: "thus all unions were united into a single body answerable to the state. The population was no longer there to be mobilised by political parties, rather, the people were the 'floating mass', or the 'ignorant mass', who needed firm guidance so they would not be lured into politics. In order to "Golkar-ize" the nation, Murtopo sometimes used the military and gangs of young thugs to eliminate political competition.

Golkar was declared on 4 February 1970, to participate in the 1971 legislative elections. Suharto's alignment with Golkar paid dividends when Golkar won 62% of the votes and an overwhelming majority in the People's Representative Council (DPR). The members of the DPR also doubled as members of the MPR, and thus, Suharto was easily re-elected to a second term as president in March 1973.

The 1971 legislative election was a success for Golkar and Suharto. Strengthened by his re-election, Suharto quickly began tightening his grip on Golkar. Control was increased in October 1973 with the implementation of a less democratic and more centralized system headed by a chairman. In October 1978, after his re-election to a 3rd term, Suharto further consolidated his control of Golkar by being elected chairman of the executive board (Ketua Dewan Pembina), a position whose authority supersedes even the party chairman. From this position, Suharto had the supreme power in Golkar while leaving the day-to-day running of Golkar to the chairman.

Aside from being dominated by Suharto, Golkar was also an organization dominated by the National Armed Forces. Out of the six people that served as Golkar chairmen during the New Order, five had a military background as officers. It was only in the last years of Suharto's rule that Harmoko, a civilian, was elected as Golkar chairman.

=== Electoral dominance in the New Order ===
Map of the largest vote share per province in Indonesia's elections from 1971 to 2019 showing the dominance of Golkar (in yellow).

Golkar continued to dominate Indonesian politics well beyond the 1971 legislative elections. In subsequent New Order legislative elections, Golkar won 62% (1977), 64% (1982), 73% (1987), 68% (1992), and 74% (1997). Golkar's dominance was so absolute that for most of the Suharto era, Indonesia was effectively a one-party state. Suharto was able to pass bills without any meaningful opposition, and was able to form a Cabinet which consisted only of Golkar appointees.

After 1973, Suharto banned all political parties except for the Indonesian Democratic Party (PDI) and the United Development Party (PPP). These two parties were nominally permitted to contest the reign of Golkar. In practice, however, Golkar permitted only a semblance of competition. Elections were "exercises in controlled aggression", and were ritualized performances of "choice", in which local authorities were to obey directives about Golkar's electoral results in their area. A system of rewards, punishments, and violence meted out by thugs helped to guarantee cooperation across the archipelago, and the perpetual reelection of Golkar.

After the 1977 and 1997 legislative elections, there were claims of electoral fraud launched by the party, who together with Golkar were the only legal political parties after 1973. There were also claims of Golkar members intimidating the electorate to vote for Golkar.

=== After Suharto: Reformasi and beyond ===
With the Fall of Suharto in May 1998, Golkar quickly sought to adapt and reform itself. In July 1998, a Special National Congress was held to elect the next chairman of Golkar. The congress was dogged by protests by both pro-Suharto and anti-Suharto groups. Suharto himself did not come to the congress. In the contest that followed, Akbar Tandjung emerged as the new chairman of Golkar after beating Army General Edi Sudrajat. It was the first time that a Golkar chairman was elected democratically rather than appointed by the chairman of the executive board. Under Akbar, the executive board was abolished and replaced by an advisory board which had considerably less authority. Edi Sudrajat, feeling that Golkar was insufficiently cooperative with reform movements, left the party and formed the Indonesian Justice and Unity Party. In the same time, elements of the Pancasila Youth that previously supported Golkar formed the Patriot Party led by Yapto Soerjosoemarno.

In 1999, Golkar lost its first democratic legislative election to Megawati Sukarnoputri's PDI-P. Golkar won 20% of the votes and was the runner-up in the legislative elections. Despite losing these elections Golkar was still able to secure Tanjung's election as Head of the DPR. October 1999 would see the MPR assemble for its General Session during which a president and a vice president would be elected. It was widely expected that Golkar would support Jusuf Habibie in his bid for a full term as president. Before Habibie could be nominated, however, he was required to deliver an accountability speech. Carried over from Suharto, this speech was a report delivered by the President to the MPR at the end of his term that showed how he had adhered to the Broad Lines of State Policy as drafted by the MPR. Under the Constitution, the MPR was responsible for making policies while the president was responsible for implementing them. The MPR rejected Habibie's accountability speech, and it was revealed that some Golkar members had voted against ratifying the speech. Habibie then withdrew his candidacy.

Although PDI-P had won the legislative elections, Golkar joined forces with the Central Axis, a political coalition put together by MPR Chairman Amien Rais, to nominate and successfully secure the election of Abdurrahman Wahid as president. Golkar, however, was unable to stop the election of Megawati as vice president.

Golkar was rewarded for its support of Wahid by having its members appointed to ministerial positions in Wahid's Cabinet. Much like those who had supported Wahid, Golkar would grow disillusioned with Wahid. In April 2000, Jusuf Kalla, a Golkar member who held position as Minister of Industries and Trade was sacked from his position. When Golkar inquired as to why this was done, Wahid alleged it was because of corruption. In July 2001, Golkar, along with its Central Axis allies, held an MPR Special Session to replace President Wahid with Megawati.

In 2002, members who were dissatisfied with Golkar's abandonment of former president Suharto including former minister Hartono and Suharto's eldest daughter Tutut Soeharto left Golkar and formed the Concern for the Nation Functional Party.

By 2004, the reformist sentiments that had led PDI-P to victory in the 1999 legislative elections had died down. Many Indonesians were disappointed with what Reformasi had achieved thus far and were also disillusioned with Megawati's presidency, enabling Golkar to emerge victorious in the 2004 legislative elections with 21% of the votes.

Unlike the other political parties who had one person as their presidential candidate from the start, Golkar had five. In April 2004, Golkar held a national convention to decide who would become Golkar's candidate for president. These five were Akbar Tanjung, General Wiranto, Lieutenant-General Prabowo, Aburizal Bakrie, and Surya Paloh. Akbar won the first round of elections but Wiranto emerged as the winner in the second round. Wiranto chose Solahuddin Wahid as his running mate.

The 2004 Presidential Election was held on 5 July. The first round was won by Susilo Bambang Yudhoyono and Jusuf Kalla who faced Megawati and Hasyim Muzadi in the September 2004 run-off. Wiranto/Wahid came second and there were allegations of disunity within the party with Akbar not fully supporting Wiranto after losing the nomination.

In August 2004 Golkar formed, with PDI-P, PPP, Reform Star Party (PBR) and Prosperous Peace Party (PDS), a national coalition to back Megawati. Further infighting would hamper Golkar in its bid to back Megawati. Fahmi Idris led a group of Golkar members in defecting and threw their support behind Yudhoyono and Kalla. At the Presidential Run-Off in September 2004, Yudhoyono emerged victorious over Megawati to become Indonesia's 6th president. Yusuf Kalla, who had gone his own way back in April 2004, became vice president.

=== 2004: Golkar under the Yudhoyono administration ===
Although he had overwhelmingly won the presidency, Yudhoyono was still weak in the DPR. His own Democratic Party had only won 7% in the legislative elections and even combined with other parties who had aligned themselves with the new government, they still had to contend with the legislative muscle of Golkar and PDI-P who now intended to play the role of opposition.

With a National Congress to be held in December 2004, Yudhoyono and Kalla had originally backed Head of DPR Agung Laksono to become Golkar chairman. When Agung was perceived to be too weak to run against Akbar, Yudhoyono and Kalla threw their weight behind Surya Paloh. Finally, when Paloh was perceived to be too weak to run against Akbar, Yudhoyono gave the green light for Kalla to run for the Golkar Chairmanship.

This was a widely controversial move. Up to that point, Yudhoyono had not let members of his administration hold a concurrent position in political parties to prevent the possible abuse of power. There were also complaints by Wiranto who claimed that some months earlier, Yudhoyono had promised to support him if he ran for the Golkar chairmanship.

On 19 December 2004, Kalla became the new Golkar chairman with over 50% of the votes. Akbar, who had expected to win a second term as Golkar chairman, was defeated with 30% of the votes. Agung and Surya, who Yudhoyono and Kalla had backed earlier, became the party vice chairman and the chairman of the advisory board, respectively. Kalla's new appointment as chairman of Golkar significantly strengthened Yudhoyono's government in Parliament and left the PDI-P as the only major opposition party in the DPR. By joining Yudhoyono's government, Golkar members also occupied key positions such as Coordinating Minister for Economic Affairs, allowing the party to influence the administration's economic policies.

After being eliminated in the first round of the 2004 Indonesian presidential election, Wiranto was "traumatized" by his defeat and decided not to run for the presidency without his own political vehicle. He resigned from Golkar Party in 2006 and established Hanura, targeting voters who had supported him during the 2004 elections. Meanwhile, Prabowo Subianto who came last in the April 2004 convention also resigned from Golkar on 12 July 2008, forming Gerindra in the process. During the 2009 Indonesian presidential election, the party partnered with Hanura and named Jusuf Kalla as the presidential candidate with Wiranto as Kalla's running mate. Kalla said he ran for president for the sake of Golkar's dignity, initially wished to remain as Yudhoyono's vice president but broke off from the coalition after Yudhoyono requested 5 candidates from Golkar to be vetted. The pair lost in last place behind Megawati Sukarnoputri and Prabowo Subianto, securing only 12,41% of the popular vote.

At the 2009 Congress, held in Pekanbaru, Aburizal Bakrie was elected chairman, winning 269 out of 583 votes, and beating Surya Paloh into second place. Surya Paloh then went on to establish the National Democratic organization, which in turn established the National Democratic Party.

=== 2014–2024: Leadership dualism and support for the Jokowi administration ===
At the end of 2014, there was dualism in management within Golkar, led by Aburizal Bakrie from the Bali National Conference and Agung Laksono from the Jakarta National Conference. In early March 2015, the Ministry of Law and Human Rights of the Republic of Indonesia issued a decree legalizing Golkar led by Agung Laksono. In April 2015, the Jakarta State Administrative Court (PTUN) issued an interim decision to postpone the implementation of a decree issued by the Minister of Law and Human Rights Yasonna Laoly which legalized the management of the Golongan Karya Party in the Agung Laksono camp. On 10 July 2015, the four judges who heard the case, namely Arif Nurdu'a, Didik Andy Prastowo, Nurnaeni Manurung and Diah Yulidar decided to reject the lawsuit filed by the General Chair of the Golongan Karya Party resulting from the Bali National Conference, Aburizal Bakrie, regarding the dualism of party management. The decision was taken at a deliberation meeting of the Jakarta PTTUN panel of judges. With the reading of the PTUN decision, the management of the Golongan Karya Party which was later recognized by the court was the result of the Bali National Conference led by Agung Laksono as general chairman and Zainudin Amali as secretary general.

However, in October 2015, the Supreme Court granted the appeal filed by Golkar as a result of the Bali National Conference led by Aburizal Bakrie. This leadership dualism began to end when an agreement was reached for reconciliation led by the former General Chair of Golkar and Vice President Jusuf Kalla in early 2016. The two camps also agreed to hold an extraordinary national meeting (Munaslub) in mid-2016. This leadership dualism officially ended on 17 May 2016 when Setya Novanto was elected as the new General Chair of the Golongan Karya Party during the Golkar National Conference in Nusa Dua, Bali.

Setya Novanto then announced that Golkar was now supporting the government of Joko Widodo despite backed his rival Prabowo Subianto in the 2014 presidential election. However, due to his corruption cases, Golkar then appointed Airlangga Hartanto as their new chairman, replacing Novanto. Hartanto would later lead Golkar to retain second place during the 2019 election, albeit with seats loss of 6. Golkar also fully backed Jokowi's reelection bid with Airlangga assures that the party will not be playing both sides unlike the previous election and prioritize the party to win 18% of the vote and Jokowi's victory. Despite securing second place, the election result shows the worst performance for Golkar throughout its electoral participation since 1971, with only 85 seats while finishing third in popular vote with only 12,1%. In the Onward Indonesia Cabinet, Golkar got 3 ministerial post, with Airlangga Hartarto appointed as Coordinating Ministry for Economic Affairs, Agus Gumiwang Kartasasmita as Minister of Industry, and Zainudin Amali as Minister of Youth and Sports.

Reflecting the results of the 2019 election, Golkar worked to make changes to rebound from the losses in the upcoming 2024 election. In ensuring this, Golkar began to diversify their voter base by making overtures to the youth vote through the works from Minister of Youth and Sports Dito Ariotedjo to attract young voters. Golkar also attracted politicians such as Ridwan Kamil and Musa Rajekshah, famous politicians in their own home provinces, to boost party standings in the election. Internally, Airlangga also worked to solidify the party base after a period of conflict between Bakrie and Laksono while continuing the consolidation process which were halted when Novanto was indicted for corruption. The leadership election in 2019 saw Hartarto re-elected as chairman unopposed with Bambang Soesatyo withdrew his candidacy.

On 24 July 2023, Airlangga was questioned for 12 hours by the Attorney General's Office regarding to his alleged involvement in the issuance of a ministerial decree that allows three companies to export unprocessed palm oil, contradicting Jokowi's presidential decree that temporarily bans palm oil export. Two days ago, Minister of Investment Bahlil Lahadalia declared his intent to run as Golkar's chairmanship, citing claims of concern from party cadres, low ratings in the polls, and the need for change. Analysts consider this move was partly orchestrated by Joko Widodo to enforce loyalty towards his preferred successor, may it be Prabowo Subianto or Ganjar Pranowo, countering his overtures to NasDem who nominated Anies Baswedan. Previously in 2022, Airlangga formed the United Indonesia Coalition with the National Mandate Party (PAN) and United Development Party (PPP) in preparation for the presidential election.

During the 2024 general election, Airlangga's coalition shook when PPP endorsed Ganjar Pranowo separately, however the coalition dissolved when Airlangga and PAN chairman Zulkifli Hasan declared support for Prabowo Subianto.

== Political identities ==
=== Ideology ===
The 2008 Law on Political Parties states that political parties are allowed to include specific characteristics that reflect their political aspirations, as long as they do not contradict Pancasila and the 1945 Constitution. In March 2023, the then chairman Airlangga Hartarto described Golkar as a "centrist" party. Outsider views on the party's political orientation vary. Academics and domestic observers classified it as a nationalist party, while their international counterparts described it as a secular-nationalist or conservative party. During the New Order, its political leaning was described as far-right. In the post-Suharto era, Golkar is now considered a centrist, centre-right, or catch-all party.

=== Political positions ===
The Golkar parliamentary group in the DPR have expressed their opinions on a few issues:

Year	Bills	Votes	Party stances/Other views
2019	Revision of Law on the Corruption Eradication Commission; RUU KPK		
2022	Law on Sexual Violence Crimes; RUU TPKS		
2022	Law on State Capital; RUU IKN		
2022	Revision of the Indonesian Criminal Code; RUU KUHP		
2023	Omnibus Law on Job Creation; RUU Cipta Kerja		

=== Party platforms ===
Under chairman Aburizal Bakrie, the party has produced a blueprint known as "Vision Indonesia 2045: A Prosperous Nation" with the aim of making Indonesia a developed nation by the centenary of the country's independence in 2045. The plan comprises three stages each lasting a decade. The key strategies in the vision comprise developing Indonesia from the villages, strengthening the role of the state, quality economic growth, equalising incomes, ensuring even development in all areas, quality education and healthcare, strengthening communities, sustained economic development, upholding the law and human rights, industrial development based on technology, and revitalization of agriculture and trade.

The first decade would lay the foundations for a developed nation, the second would accelerate development and the final decade would see Indonesia become a developed nation. Each stage would have targets for indicators such as economic growth, GDP, and levels of unemployment and poverty.

Indicator	2015–2025	2025–2035	2035–2045
Economic growth	8–9%	10–11%	6–7%
Per capita income	US$10,000–12,000	US$21,000–23,000	US$41,000–43,000
Unemployment	4–6%	4%	4%
Poverty ratio	5–8%	2–3%	1–2%
Life expectancy	75	78	82
Gini ratio	0.35	0.31	0.28
Human Development Index	0.80	0.86	0.91

=== Organisation and factions ===
During the New Order Golkar was formally divided into seven (eight since 1971) organizations, called Main Organization Groups (Kelompok Induk Organisasi), or KINO. These were:

- the Trikarya, consisting of:
  - Central Indonesian Workers' Organization (Sentral Organisasi Karyawan Swadiri Indonesia, SOKSI/CIWO);
  - Mutual Cooperation Multifunction Organizations' Union (Kesatuan Organisasi Serbaguna Gotong Royong, KOSGORO);
  - Mutual Assistance Families Association (Musyawarah Kekeluargaan Gotong Royong, MKGR);
- Indonesian People's Working Movement (Gerakan Karya Rakyat Indonesia, GAKARI/IPWM);
- the Defense and Security Mass Organizations (Organisasi Kemasyarakatan Pertahanan dan Keamanan, Ormas Hankam/DSMOs);
- professional organizations (Golongan Profesi);
- the Development Movement (Gerakan Pembangunan);
- and, since its establishment by Presidential decree in 1971, the Employees' Corps of the Republic of Indonesia (Korps Pegawai Republik Indonesia, KORPRI).

However, Golkar during this era was also de facto divided into three factions:

- The ABRI faction: Consisted of members of the Indonesian armed forces (ABRI) who under Suharto played a dominant role in political affairs. This faction was headed by the ABRI Commander and was commonly known as the A faction. Until 1999, constables of the National Police were included as members of the National Armed Forces and with similar military training as the rest of the Forces. The Ormas Hankam was, as a general rule, supportive of the Armed Forces faction. It provided much of the military representation in the People's Consultative Assembly.
- The Bureaucrats (Birokrat) faction: Consisted of KORPRI members—which are de jure all civil servants; non-civil servant public officers; employees of state-, provincial- and municipal-owned enterprises; and ABRI service personnel employed by the government. This faction was headed by the Home Affairs Minister and was commonly known as the B faction.
- The Groups (Utusan Golongan) faction: Consisted of Golkar members who were neither armed forces service personnel nor the bureaucracy. This faction was headed by the Golkar Chairman and was commonly known as the G faction. Its composition was made up of members of the other organizations that are part of the party.

These three factions worked closely together to gain consensus and in the case of nominating a presidential candidate it was the heads of these three factions who went to inform the candidate (which until 1998 was Suharto) that he had just been nominated as Golkar's presidential candidate. The three factions did not always work together however. In 1988, the ABRI faction was unable to nominate Sudharmono as vice president. The factions disappeared along with the fall of the New Order.

== Leadership structure ==
The following leadership structure of the party are as follows (2024–2029).

General Chairperson of the Party: Bahlil Lahadalia

Deputy Chairman

- Deputy General Chairperson for Party Affairs; Kahar Muzakir
- Deputy General Chairperson for Inter-Organizational Relations: Bambang Soesatyo
- Deputy General Chairperson for Functional Public Policy 1: Adies Kadir
- Deputy General Chairperson for Functional Public Policy 2: Idrus Marham
- Deputy General Chairperson for Electoral Function 1: Ace Hasan Syadzily
- Deputy General Chairperson for Electoral Function 2: Meutya Hafid
- Deputy General Chairperson for Electoral Victory – Sumatra: Ahmad Doli Kurnia
- Deputy General Chairperson for Electoral Victory – Java and Kalimantan: Whaji
- Deputy General Chairperson for Electoral Victory – East Indonesia: Emanuel Melkies Laka Lena

Party Affairs

- Leader of Organizational Affairs: Yahya Zaini
- Leader of Caderization and Membership Affairs: Zulfikar Arse Sadikin
- Leader of Ideological Strengthening and Functional Affairs: Panggah Susanto

== Leaders ==
No.	Name (Lifespan)	Portrait	Constituency / title	Took office	Left office	Election results	Government		
No.	Name (Lifespan)	Portrait	Constituency / title	Took office	Left office	Election results	Party	President	Term
Chair of the Joint Secretariat of the Functional Groups
1	Djuhartono (1925-1987)		—	20 October 1964	7 November 1967	1964 Unopposed	Ind	Sukarno	1964–1967
General Chairman of the Functional Groups (Note: as political organization)
2	Suprapto Sukowati (1922–1972)		—	7 November 1967	9 August 1972		Golkar	Suharto (Note: as Chairman of Presidium Cabinet from 25 July 1966 until 17 October 1967) (Note: as Acting president from 12 March 1967 until 27 March 1968)	1966–1998
3	Amir Murtono (1925-1987)		Rep for Central Java	9 August 1972	25 October 1983	1973 Unopposed 1978 Unopposed	Golkar	Suharto	1966–1998
4	Sudharmono (1927-2006)		Minister of State Secretariat (Note: until 11 March 1988) Vice President of Indonesia (Note: since 11 March 1988)	25 October 1983	25 October 1988	1983 Unopposed	Golkar	Suharto	1966–1998
5	Wahono (1925-2004)		Rep for East Java (Note: since 1 October 1992)	25 October 1988	25 October 1993	1988 Unopposed	Golkar	Suharto	1966–1998
6	Harmoko (1939-2021)		Minister of Information (Note: until 16 March 1997) Rep for West Java (Note: since 1 October 1997)	25 October 1993	11 July 1998	1993 Unopposed	Golkar	Suharto	1966–1998
6	Harmoko (1939-2021)		Minister of Information Rep for West Java	25 October 1993	11 July 1998	1993 Unopposed	Golkar	Habibie	1998–1999
General Chairman of the Golkar Party
7	Akbar Tandjung (born 1945)		Minister of State Secretariat (Note: until 1 October 1999) Rep for DKI Jakarta (Note: since 1 October 1999 until 30 September 2004)	11 July 1998	19 December 2004	1998 1st round Edi Sudrajat – 15; Akbar Tandjung 10; Hamengkubuwono X – 1 1998 2nd round Akbar Tandjung – 17; Edi Sudrajat – 10 2003 1-year extension	Golkar	Habibie	1998–1999
7	Akbar Tandjung (born 1945)		Minister of State Secretariat Rep for DKI Jakarta	11 July 1998	19 December 2004	1998 1st round Edi Sudrajat – 15; Akbar Tandjung 10; Hamengkubuwono X – 1 1998 2nd round Akbar Tandjung – 17; Edi Sudrajat – 10 2003 1-year extension	PKB	Wahid	1999–2001
7	Akbar Tandjung (born 1945)		Minister of State Secretariat Rep for DKI Jakarta	11 July 1998	19 December 2004	1998 1st round Edi Sudrajat – 15; Akbar Tandjung 10; Hamengkubuwono X – 1 1998 2nd round Akbar Tandjung – 17; Edi Sudrajat – 10 2003 1-year extension	PDIP	Megawati	2001-2004
7	Akbar Tandjung (born 1945)		Minister of State Secretariat Rep for DKI Jakarta	11 July 1998	19 December 2004	1998 1st round Edi Sudrajat – 15; Akbar Tandjung 10; Hamengkubuwono X – 1 1998 2nd round Akbar Tandjung – 17; Edi Sudrajat – 10 2003 1-year extension	PD	Yudhoyono	2004-2014
8	Jusuf Kalla (born 1942)		Vice President of Indonesia	19 December 2004	8 October 2009	2004 1st round Jusuf Kalla – 269; Akbar Tandjung – 191; Marwah Daud Ibrahim – 13 2004 2nd round Jusuf Kalla – 323; Akbar Tandjung – 156	PD	Yudhoyono	2004-2014
9	Aburizal Bakrie (born 1946)		Coordinating Minister of People's Welfare (Note: until 20 October 2009)	8 October 2009	3 December 2014 (Note: Bakrie's position as chairman was initially accepted by the majority of participants in the national conference. However, his position was threatened after another national conference appointed Agung Laksono as chairman on 8 December 2014. They held their national conference in Jakarta, while Bakrie's in Bali, resulting in a dual leadership position within the party. The conflict between the two camps ended after the Golkar Party held an extraordinary conference on 17 May 2016, to elect a new general chairman for the remainder of the 2016–2019 term.)	2009 Aburizal Bakrie – 296; Surya Paloh – 240	PD	Yudhoyono	2004-2014
9	Aburizal Bakrie (born 1946)		Coordinating Minister of People's Welfare	8 October 2009	3 December 2014	2009 Aburizal Bakrie – 296; Surya Paloh – 240	PDIP	Widodo	2014-2024
Dualism Leadership
–	Aburizal Bakrie (born 1946)		—	3 December 2014	17 May 2016	2014 Unopposed	PDIP	Widodo	2014-2024
–	Agung Laksono (born 1949)		—	8 December 2014	17 May 2016	2014 Agung Laksono – 144; Priyo Budi Santoso – 77; Agus Gumiwang Kartasasmita – 71	PDIP	Widodo	2014-2024
10	Setya Novanto (born 1955)		Rep for East Nusa Tenggara II	17 May 2016	13 December 2017 (Note: Novanto stepped down as chairman before his term ended at the next national conference in 2019. He resigned after being named a suspect in a corruption case related to the electronic Identity Card (e-KTP).)	2016 1st round Setya Novanto – 296; Ade Komarudin – 173; Azis Syamsuddin – 48; Syahrul Yasin Limpo – 27; Airlangga Hartarto – 14; Mahyudin – 2 Priyo Budi Santoso – 1 Indra Bambang Utoyo – 1 2016 2nd round Unopposed walkover	PDIP	Widodo	2014-2024
11	Airlangga Hartarto (born 1962)		Coordinating Minister for Economic Affairs (Note: since 23 October 2019)	13 December 2017 (Note: Hartarto has held the position of general chairman since 13 December 2017, replacing his predecessor, Setya Novanto, through a plenary meeting held on the same day.)	10 August 2024 (Note: Hartarto stepped down as general chairman before his term ends at the next national conference in 2024.)	2017 Unopposed 2019 Unopposed	PDIP	Widodo	2014-2024
–	Agus Gumiwang Kartasasmita (born 1969) Acting		Minister of Industry	13 August 2024	21 August 2024	Acting	PDIP	Widodo	2014-2024
12	Bahlil Lahadalia (born 1976)		Minister of Energy and Mineral Resources	21 August 2024	Incumbent	2024 Unopposed	PDIP	Widodo	2014-2024
12	Bahlil Lahadalia (born 1976)		Minister of Energy and Mineral Resources	21 August 2024	Incumbent	2024 Unopposed	Gerindra	Subianto	Incumbent

== Election results ==
=== Legislative election results ===
Election	Ballot number	Leader	Seats		Total votes	Share of votes	Outcome of election
Election	Ballot number	Leader	No.	±	Total votes	Share of votes	Outcome of election
1971	5	Suprapto Sukowati	236 / 360		34,348,673	62.80%	Governing coalition
1977	2	Amir Murtono	232 / 360	▼4	39,750,096	62.11%	Governing coalition (until 1978)
1977	2	Amir Murtono	232 / 360	▼4	39,750,096	62.11%	Governing majority (from 1978)
1982	2	Amir Murtono	242 / 360	▲10	48,334,724	64.34%	Governing majority
1987	2	Sudharmono	299 / 400	▲57	62,783,680	73.11%	Governing majority
1992	2	Wahono	282 / 400	▼17	66,599,331	68.10%	Governing majority
1997	2	Harmoko	325 / 425	▲43	84,187,907	74.51%	Governing majority (until 1998)
1997	2	Harmoko	325 / 425	▲43	84,187,907	74.51%	Governing coalition (from 1998) (Note: Golkar having a coalition agreement with the PPP in March 1998 with the PPP joining in the Seventh Development Cabinet and the Indonesian Democratic Party in May 1998 with joining in the Development Reform Cabinet.)
1999	33	Akbar Tandjung	120 / 462	▼205	23,741,749	22.46%	Governing coalition
2004	20	Akbar Tandjung	128 / 550	▲8	24,480,757	21.58%	Governing coalition
2009	23	Jusuf Kalla	106 / 560	▼22	15,037,757	14.45%	Governing coalition
2014	5	Aburizal Bakrie	91 / 560	▼15	18,432,312	14.75%	Opposition (until 2016)
2014	5	Aburizal Bakrie	91 / 560	▼15	18,432,312	14.75%	Governing coalition (from 2016)
2019	4	Airlangga Hartarto	85 / 575	▼6	17,229,789	12,31%	Governing coalition
2024	4	Airlangga Hartarto	102 / 580	▲17	23,208,654	15.29%	Governing coalition

=== Presidential election results ===
Election	Ballot number	Pres. candidate	Running mate	1st round (Total votes)	Share of votes	Outcome	2nd round (Total votes)	Share of votes	Outcome
2004	1	**Wiranto**	Salahuddin Wahid	26,286,788	22.15%	Eliminated	Runoff		
2009	3	**Jusuf Kalla**	Wiranto	15,081,814	12.41%	Lost			
2014	1	Prabowo Subianto	Hatta Rajasa	62,576,444	46.85%	Lost			
2019	1	Joko Widodo	Ma'ruf Amin	85,607,362	55.50%	Elected			
2024	2	Prabowo Subianto	Gibran Rakabuming Raka	96,214,691	58.59%	Elected			

Note: Bold text indicates the party member

== Sources ==
- Ameliya, Tri Meilani (19 March 2023). Setiawan, Agus (ed.). "Airlangga: Partai Golkar adalah partai tengah" [Airlangga: Golkar is a center party]. Antara (in Indonesian).
- Bulkin, Nadia (24 October 2013). "Indonesia's Political Parties". Carnegie Endowment for International Peace. Archived from the original on 14 August 2021.
- Elson, Robert (2001). Suharto: A Political Biography. Cambridge University Press. ISBN 0-521-77326-1.
- Lee, Christian; Paath, Carlos K. Y. (31 May 2019). "How Different Are Political Parties in Indonesia From One Another?". Jakarta Globe.
- Honna, Jun (December 2012). "Inside the Democrat Party: power, politics and conflict in Indonesia's Presidential Party". South East Asia Research. 20 (4): 473–489. doi:10.5367/sear.2012.0125. JSTOR 23752520.
- Hwang, Julie Chernov (2013). "Islamic identity, yes, Islamist parties, no: The mainstreaming of political Islam and its challenge for Islamist parties". In Williams, Michelle Hale (ed.). The Multicultural Dilemma: Migration, Ethnic politics, and State Intermediation. Routledge. ISBN 978-0-203-08277-5.
- King, Blair A. (2011). "Chapter 4. Government and Politics". In Frederick, William H.; Worden, Robert L. (eds.). Indonesia: A Country Study. Area handbook series, 39. Library of Congress, Federal Research Division (6th ed.). Washington, DC: U.S. Government Printing Office. pp. 225–306. ISBN 978-0-8444-0790-6.
- Mietzner, Marcus (2013). Money, Power, and Ideology: Political Parties in Post-Authoritarian Indonesia. Asian Studies Association of Australia (ASAA) - Southeast Asia. NUS Press. ISBN 978-997-1697-99-0.
- Nishihara, Masashi (1972). Golkar and the Indonesian elections of 1971. Modern Indonesia Project, Cornell University. ISBN 978-0877630043.
- Ricklefs, M. C. (2008). A History of Modern Indonesia Since c. 1200 (revised ed.). Palgrave Macmillan. ISBN 978-1137052018.
- Saifulloh, Putra Perdana Ahmad (December 2016). "Kewajiban Partai Politik Berideologi Pancasila Ditinjau dari Prinsip-Prinsip Negara Hukum Indonesia" [The obligation of political parties to embrace the ideology of Pancasila: examined from the principles of the rule of law in Indonesia]. Pandecta Research Law Journal (in Indonesian). 11 (2). doi:10.15294/pandecta.v11i2.9276 (inactive 12 July 2025).
- The Economist (24 March 2009). "Indonesia's election". The Economist.
- The Jakarta Post (19 March 2023). "Golkar is a 'center' party, Airlangga says". The Jakarta Post. Archived from the original on 20 March 2023.
- Vann, Michael G. (29 September 2021). "Indonesia Still Hasn't Escaped Suharto's Genocidal Legacy". Jacobin.
- Vickers, Adrian (2005). A History of Modern Indonesia. Cambridge University Press. ISBN 978-1139447614.
