= Speaker of the House of Representatives (Indonesia) =

House of Representatives' speaker in Indonesia

Speaker of the House of Representatives of Indonesia
- Insignia of the House of Representatives of Indonesia

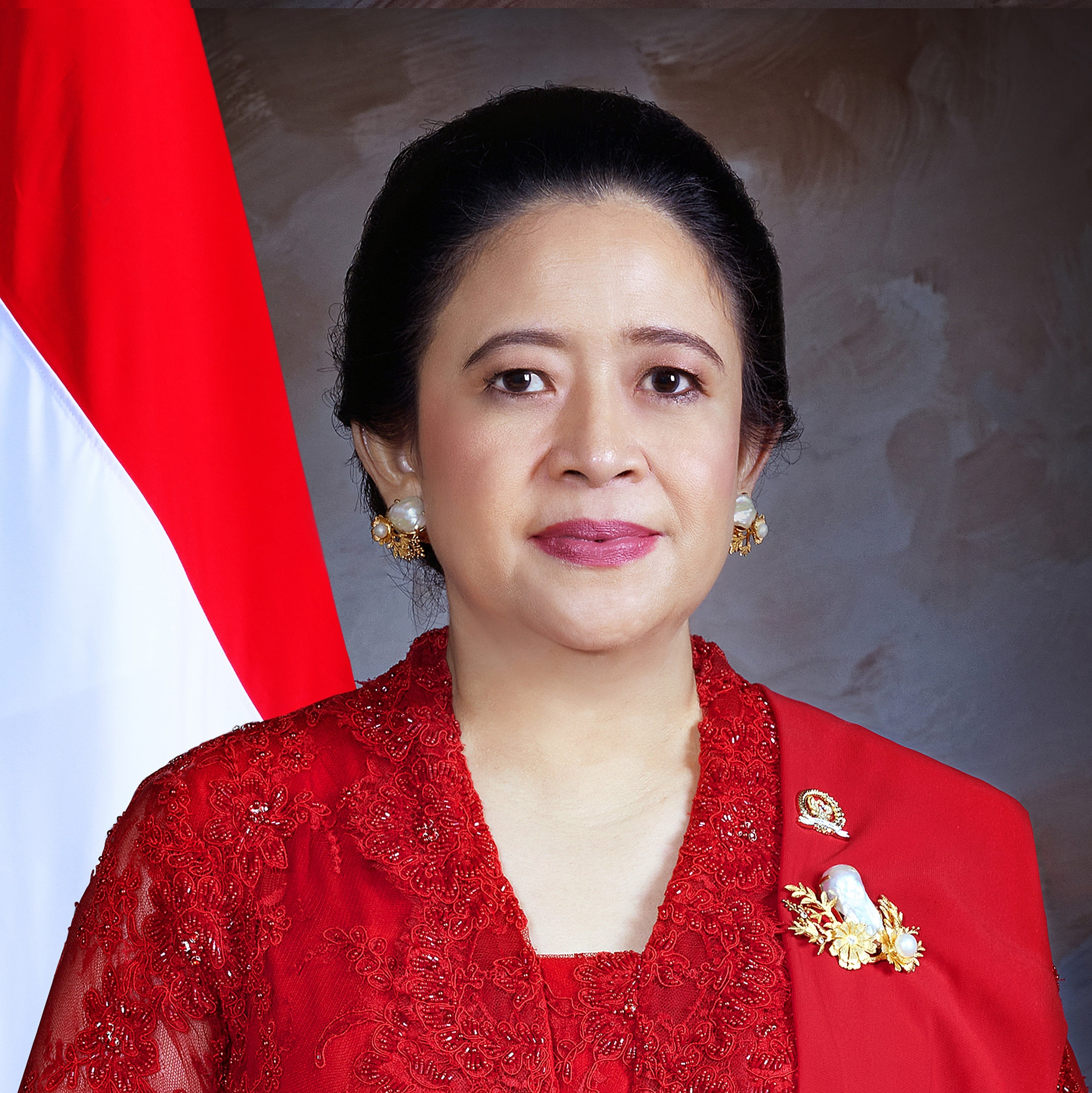
- Incumbent; Puan Maharani since 1 October 2019
- People's Representative Council
- Style: Mr. Speaker (informal – male); Madam Speaker (informal – female); The Right Honorable (formal); Her Excellency (Respected Title)
- Status: Presiding officer
- Residence: Rumah Dinas Ketua DPR RI
- Seat: MPR/DPR/DPD building, Jakarta
- Appointer: House of Representatives of the Republic of Indonesia
- Term length: 5 years
- Constituting instrument: Constitution of Indonesia
- Formation: 22 February 1950; 76 years ago
- First holder: Sartono
- Deputy: Deputy Speakers of the House of Representatives
- Salary: Rp 5,040,000 per month

The Speaker of the House of Representatives, (Indonesian: Ketua Dewan Perwakilan Rakyat, lit. 'Chairperson of the People's Representative Council'; Ketua DPR) is the presiding officer of the House of Representatives of Indonesia. The speaker is the political and parliamentary leader of the House of Representatives and is simultaneously the Council's presiding officer. The speakers also perform various other administrative and procedural functions.

== Duties ==
The duties of the speaker have been determined on 22 October 2019 through the Decree of the House of Representatives of the Republic of Indonesia Number 34/DPR RI/I/2019-2020 concerning the Division of Duties of the Leaders of the DPR RI for the 2019-2024 Membership Period. The duties of the Speaker of the DPR RI are general in nature and cover all Coordination Fields, namely:

- Coordinator for Political and Security Affairs (Korpolkam) in charge of the scope of duties of Commission I, Commission II, Commission III, Inter-Parliamentary Cooperation Agency, and the Legislative Body.
- Coordinator for Economics and Finance (Korekku) in charge of the scope of duties of Commission XI, the Budget Agency, and the State Financial Accountability Agency.
- Coordinator for Industry and Development (Korinbang) in charge of the scope of duties of Commission IV, Commission V, Commission VI, and Commission VII.
- Coordinator for Public Wellbeing (Kokesra) in charge of the scope of duties of Commission VIII, Commission IX, Commission X, the Honorary Court of the Council, and the Household Affairs Agency.

== List of speakers ==
This is a list of speakers of the House of Representatives, the lower house of Indonesia: (Note: The list does not include chair of the Central Indonesian National Committee.)

No	Photo	Name	Assumed office	Left office	Term	Party	Notes	Deputies
1		Sartono (1900–1968)	22 February 1950	16 August 1950	1	Republic of Indonesia (PNI)	(Note: In 1949, after Indonesia became a federal state, this office was known as the Speaker of the People's Representative Council of the United States of Indonesia (DPR RIS). From 16 August 1950 to 26 March 1956 known as Speaker of the Provisional People's Representative Council (DPR Sementara).) (Note: During the oeriod of the federal parliament, the members of the House represented their states rather than their political party.)	A. M. Tambunan; Arudji Kartawinata
1		Sartono (1900–1968)	16 August 1950	26 March 1956	2	PNI	(Note: In 1949, after Indonesia became a federal state, this office was known as the Speaker of the People's Representative Council of the United States of Indonesia (DPR RIS). From 16 August 1950 to 26 March 1956 known as Speaker of the Provisional People's Representative Council (DPR Sementara).) (Note: During the oeriod of the federal parliament, the members of the House represented their states rather than their political party.)	A. M. Tambunan; Arudji Kartawinata; Tadjuddin Noor
1		Sartono (1900–1968)	26 March 1956	22 July 1959	3	PNI	(Note: In 1949, after Indonesia became a federal state, this office was known as the Speaker of the People's Representative Council of the United States of Indonesia (DPR RIS). From 16 August 1950 to 26 March 1956 known as Speaker of the Provisional People's Representative Council (DPR Sementara).) (Note: During the oeriod of the federal parliament, the members of the House represented their states rather than their political party.)	Arudji Kartawinata; Zainul Arifin; Zainal Abidin Ahmad
1		Sartono (1900–1968)	22 July 1959	26 June 1960	4	PNI	(Note: In 1949, after Indonesia became a federal state, this office was known as the Speaker of the People's Representative Council of the United States of Indonesia (DPR RIS). From 16 August 1950 to 26 March 1956 known as Speaker of the Provisional People's Representative Council (DPR Sementara).) (Note: During the oeriod of the federal parliament, the members of the House represented their states rather than their political party.)	Arudji Kartawinata; Zainul Arifin; Zainal Abidin Ahmad
2		Zainul Arifin (1909–1963)	26 June 1960	13 January 1963	5	Nahdlatul Ulama	(Note: In 1960, following the enactment of the 1959 Presidential Decree, this position became known as the Speaker of the Mutual Assistance House of Representatives. During this period, the council was directly under the President Sukarno.)	Arudji Kartawinata; Achmad Sjaichu; I Gusti Gde Subamia
3		Arudji Kartawinata (1905–1970)	13 January 1963	15 November 1965	5	PSII		Muhammad Hatta Lukman; Daeng Mamangung
3		Arudji Kartawinata (1905–1970)	15 November 1965	24 February 1966	6	PSII		I Gusti Gde Subamia; Achmad Sjaichu
4		I Gusti Gde Subamia (1921–1986)	24 February 1966	2 May 1966	6	PNI		Mohammad Isnaeni; Asmara Hadi
—		Achmad Sjaichu (1923–1995); Acting Speaker	2 May 1966	17 May 1966	6	Nahdlatul Ulama		Daeng Mamanggung; Syarif Thayeb
—		Daeng Mamanggung (1922–2006); Acting Speaker	2 May 1966	17 May 1966	6	Military		Daeng Mamanggung; Syarif Thayeb
—		Syarif Thayeb (1920–1989); Acting Speaker	2 May 1966	17 May 1966	6	Golkar		Daeng Mamanggung; Syarif Thayeb
5		Achmad Sjaichu (1923–1995)	17 May 1966	19 November 1966	6	Nahdlatul Ulama		Mohammad Isnaeni; Ben Mang Reng Say; Daeng Mamanggung (1966–1968); Sulistio (1968–1971); Syarif Thayeb
5		Achmad Sjaichu (1923–1995)	19 November 1966	28 October 1971	7	Nahdlatul Ulama		Mohammad Isnaeni; Ben Mang Reng Say; Daeng Mamanggung (1966–1968); Sulistio (1968–1971); Syarif Thayeb
6		Idham Chalid (1921–2010)	28 October 1971	30 September 1977	8	Nahdlatul Ulama	(Note: Merged with the position of Speaker of the People's Consultative Assembly.)	Sumiskum; Jailani Naro; Domo Pranoto (1971–1977); Muhammad Sudjono (1977); Mohammad Isnaeni
7		Adam Malik (1917–1984)	1 October 1977	23 March 1978	9	Golkar		Mashuri Saleh; Masjkur; Kartidjo; Mohammad Isnaeni (1977–1982); Hardjantho Soemodisastro (1982)
8		Daryatmo (1925–1992)	23 March 1978	30 September 1982	9	Golkar		Mashuri Saleh; Masjkur; Kartidjo; Mohammad Isnaeni (1977–1982); Hardjantho Soemodisastro (1982)
9		Amir Machmud (1923–1995)	1 October 1982	30 September 1987	10	Golkar		Kharis Suhud; Amir Murtono; Hardjantho Soemodisastro; Nuddin Lubis
10		Kharis Suhud (1925–2012)	1 October 1987	30 September 1992	11	Golkar		Syaiful Sulun; Raden Sukardi; Suryadi; Jailani Naro
11		Wahono (1925–2004)	1 October 1992	30 September 1997	12	Golkar		Ismail Hasan Metareum; Suryadi; Soetedjo
12		Harmoko (1939–2021)	1 October 1997	30 September 1999	13	Golkar		Syarwan Hamid; Abdul Gafur; Ismail Hasan Metareum; Fatimah Achmad; Poedjono Pranyoto
13		Akbar Tandjung (born 1945)	6 October 1999	30 September 2004	14	Golkar	(Note: Separated with the position of Speaker of the People's Consultative Assembly.)	Soetardjo Soerjogoeritno (PDI-P); Khofifah Indar Parawansa (PKB); Muhaimin Iskandar (PKB); Andi Mappetahang Fatwa (PAN)
14		Agung Laksono (born 1949)	1 October 2004	30 September 2009	15	Golkar		Soetardjo Soerjogoeritno (PDI-P); Muhaimin Iskandar (PKB); Zaenal Maarif (PBR)
15		Marzuki Alie (born 1955)	1 October 2009	30 September 2014	16	Democratic		Priyo Budi Santoso (Golkar); Pramono Anung (PDI-P); Anis Matta (PKS); Marwoto Mintohardjono (PAN); Taufik Kurniawan (PAN); Sohibul Iman (PKS)
16		Setya Novanto (born 1954)	2 October 2014	16 December 2015	17	Golkar	(Note: Setya Novanto resigned after being sentenced to prison after a case regarding to the Freeport Indonesia company. The case began after the leak of his conversation with the CEO of the Freeport Indonesia, Ma'roef Sjamsoeddin, and businessman M. Riza Chalid.)	Fadli Zon (Gerindra); Agus Hermanto (Demokrat); Taufik Kurniawan (PAN); Fahri Hamzah (PKS); Utut Adianto (PDI-P)
—		Fadli Zon (born 1971); Acting Speaker	16 December 2015	11 January 2016	17	Gerindra	(Note: Fadli Zon was elected as the acting speaker in a closed meeting between the deputy speakers of the council after the resignation of Setya Novanto.)	Fadli Zon (Gerindra); Agus Hermanto (Demokrat); Taufik Kurniawan (PAN); Fahri Hamzah (PKS); Utut Adianto (PDI-P)
17		Ade Komarudin (born 1965)	11 January 2016	30 November 2016	17	Golkar		Fadli Zon (Gerindra); Agus Hermanto (Demokrat); Taufik Kurniawan (PAN); Fahri Hamzah (PKS); Utut Adianto (PDI-P)
(16)		Setya Novanto (born 1954)	30 November 2016	11 December 2017	17	Golkar		Fadli Zon (Gerindra); Agus Hermanto (Demokrat); Taufik Kurniawan (PAN); Fahri Hamzah (PKS); Utut Adianto (PDI-P)
—		Fadli Zon (born 1971); Acting Speaker	11 December 2017	15 January 2018	17	Gerindra		Fadli Zon (Gerindra); Agus Hermanto (Demokrat); Taufik Kurniawan (PAN); Fahri Hamzah (PKS); Utut Adianto (PDI-P)
18		Bambang Soesatyo (born 1962)	15 January 2018	30 September 2019	17	Golkar		Fadli Zon (Gerindra); Agus Hermanto (Demokrat); Taufik Kurniawan (PAN); Fahri Hamzah (PKS); Utut Adianto (PDI-P)
19		Puan Maharani (born 1973)	1 October 2019	Incumbent	18	PDI-P	(Note: First female speaker of the parliament.)	Azis Syamsuddin (Golkar); Lodewijk Freidrich Paulus (Golkar); Sufmi Dasco Ahmad (Gerindra); Rachmad Gobel (NasDem); Muhaimin Iskandar (PKB)
19		Puan Maharani (born 1973)	1 October 2019	Incumbent	19	PDI-P	(Note: First female speaker of the parliament.)	Adies Kadir (Golkar); Sufmi Dasco Ahmad (Gerindra); Saan Mustopa (NasDem); Cucun Ahmad Syamsurijal (PKB)
19		Puan Maharani (born 1973)	1 October 2019	Incumbent	19	PDI-P	(Note: First female speaker of the parliament.)	Sari Yuliati (Golkar); Sufmi Dasco Ahmad (Gerindra); Saan Mustopa (NasDem); Cucun Ahmad Syamsurijal (PKB)

== See also ==
- House of Representatives
- List of deputy speakers of the House of Representatives
- List of speakers of the People's Consultative Assembly
- List of speakers of the Regional Representative Council
