= List of deputy speakers of the House of Representatives (Indonesia) =

Deputy Speakers of the House of Representatives
- Incumbent; Sufmi Dasco Ahmad; Saan Mustopa; Cucun Ahmad Syamsurijal since 1 October 2024
- Term length: 5 years
- Inaugural holder: Albert Mangaratua Tambunan; Arudji Kartawinata
- Formation: 22 February 1950
- Salary: Rp 78,800,000 per month (including benefits)

This is a list of the deputy speakers of the House of Representatives of Indonesia. At the start of each five-year period, multiple deputies are elected from the members of the house. The current leadership of the body has four deputy speakers.

== List ==
Term	Photo	Name	Assumed office	Left office	Fraction/Party	Notes	Speaker
1		Albert Mangaratua Tambunan	22 February 1950	15 August 1950	Republic of Indonesia		Sartono
1		Arudji Kartawinata	22 February 1950	15 August 1950	Republic of Indonesia		Sartono
2		Albert Mangaratua Tambunan	16 August 1950	26 March 1956	Parkindo		Sartono
2		Arudji Kartawinata	16 August 1950	26 March 1956	PSII		Sartono
2		Tadjuddin Noor	16 August 1950	26 March 1956	PIR		Sartono
3		Zainul Arifin	26 March 1956	22 July 1959	NU		Sartono
3		Arudji Kartawinata	26 March 1956	22 July 1959	PSII		Sartono
3		Zainal Abidin Ahmad	26 March 1956	22 July 1959	Masyumi		Sartono
4		Zainul Arifin	20 September 1959	29 June 1960	NU		Sartono
4		Arudji Kartawinata	22 July 1959	29 June 1960	PSII		Sartono
4		Zainal Abidin Ahmad	22 July 1959	29 June 1960	Masyumi		Sartono
5		Arudji Kartawinata	20 September 1960	4 March 1963	Religious (PSII/NU)		Zainul Arifin (1960-1963)
5		Achmad Sjaichu	3 September 1963	15 November 1965	Religious (PSII/NU)		Zainul Arifin (1960-1963)
5		I Gusti Gde Subamia	26 December 1960	15 November 1965	Nationalist (PNI)		Zainul Arifin (1960-1963)
5		Muhammad Hatta Lukman	26 December 1960	15 November 1965	Communist (PKI)		Arudji Kartawinata (1963-1965)
5		Mursalin Daeng Mamangung	26 December 1960	15 November 1965	Military		Arudji Kartawinata (1963-1965)
6		Achmad Sjaichu	15 November 1965	19 November 1966	Religious (NU)		Arudji Kartawinata (November 1965 - February 1966)
6		I Gusti Gde Subamia	15 November 1965	24 February 1966	Nationalist (PNI/Partindo)		Arudji Kartawinata (November 1965 - February 1966)
6		Asmara Hadi	26 February 1966	2 May 1966	Nationalist (PNI/Partindo)		I Gusti Gde Subamia (February 1966 - May 1966)
6		Mohammad Isnaeni	17 May 1966	19 November 1966	Nationalist (PNI/Partindo)		I Gusti Gde Subamia (February 1966 - May 1966)
6		Mursalin Daeng Mamangung	15 November 1965	19 November 1966	Military		Collective leadership (2 May 1966 - 17 May 1966): Achmad Sjaichu; Mursalin Daeng Mamanggung; Syarif Thayeb
6		Syarif Thayeb	26 February 1966	19 November 1966	Golkar		Collective leadership (2 May 1966 - 17 May 1966): Achmad Sjaichu; Mursalin Daeng Mamanggung; Syarif Thayeb
6		Ben Mang Reng Say	17 May 1966	19 November 1966	Catholic (Catholic Party)		Achmad Sjaichu (May 1966 - November 1966)
7		Mohammad Isnaeni	19 November 1966	29 October 1971	PNI		Achmad Sjaichu
7		Mursalin Daeng Mamangung	19 November 1966	20 August 1968	Military		Achmad Sjaichu
7		Sulistio	27 August 1968	29 October 1971	Military		Achmad Sjaichu
7		Syarif Thayeb	19 November 1966	29 October 1971	Golkar		Achmad Sjaichu
7		Ben Mang Reng Say	19 November 1966	29 October 1971	Catholic Party		Achmad Sjaichu
8		Sumiskum	28 October 1971	1 October 1977	Golkar		Idham Chalid
8		Domo Pranoto	28 October 1971	13 June 1977	Military		Idham Chalid
8		Muhammad Sudjono	20 June 1977	1 October 1977	Military		Idham Chalid
8		Jailani Naro	28 October 1971	1 October 1977	Parmusi (1971-1973); PPP (1973-1977)		Idham Chalid
8		Mohammad Isnaeni	28 October 1971	1 October 1977	PNI (1971-1973); PDI (1973-1977)		Idham Chalid
9		Mashuri Saleh	1 October 1977	1 October 1982	Golkar		Adam Malik (1977-1978)
9		Kartidjo	1 October 1977	1 October 1982	Military		Adam Malik (1977-1978)
9		Masykur	1 October 1977	1 October 1982	PPP		Adam Malik (1977-1978)
9		Mohammad Isnaeni	1 October 1977	28 January 1982	PDI		Daryatmo (1978-1982)
9		Hardjantho Soemodisastro	28 January 1982	1 October 1982	PDI		Daryatmo (1978-1982)
10		Amir Murtono	1 October 1982	1 October 1987	Golkar		Amirmachmud
10		Kharis Suhud	1 October 1982	1 October 1987	Military		Amirmachmud
10		Nuddin Lubis	1 October 1982	1 October 1987	PPP		Amirmachmud
10		Hardjantho Sumodisastro	1 October 1982	1 October 1987	PDI		Amirmachmud
11		Sukardi	1 October 1987	1 October 1992	Golkar		Kharis Suhud
11		Syaiful Sulun	1 October 1987	1 October 1992	Military		Kharis Suhud
11		Jailani Naro	1 October 1987	1 October 1992	PPP		Kharis Suhud
11		Suryadi	1 October 1987	1 October 1992	PDI		Kharis Suhud
12		John Ario Katili	1 October 1992	1 October 1997	Golkar		Wahono
12		Soetedjo	1 October 1992	1 October 1997	Military		Wahono
12		Ismail Hasan Metareum	1 October 1992	1 October 1997	PPP		Wahono
12		Suryadi	1 October 1992	1 October 1997	PDI		Wahono
13		Abdul Gafur	1 October 1997	1 October 1999	Golkar		Harmoko
13		Syarwan Hamid	1 October 1997	23 May 1998	Military	(Note: Appointed as Minister of Home Affairs by President B. J. Habibie on 23 May 1998.)	Harmoko
13		Hari Sabarno	23 May 1998	1 October 1999	Military		Harmoko
13		Ismail Hasan Metareum	1 October 1997	1 October 1999	PPP		Harmoko
13		Fatimah Achmad	1 October 1997	1 October 1999	PDI		Harmoko
14		Soetardjo Soerjogoeritno	6 October 1999	1 October 2004	PDI-P		Akbar Tandjung
14		Khofifah Indar Parawansa	6 October 1999	28 October 1999	PKB	Sworn in as State Minister for Female Empowerment by President Abdurrahman Wahid on 28 October 1999	Akbar Tandjung
14		Muhaimin Iskandar	28 October 1999	1 October 2004	PKB		Akbar Tandjung
14		Hamzah Haz	6 October 1999	28 October 1999	PPP	Sworn in as Coordinating Minister for Prosperity and Poverty Alleviation by President Abdurrahman Wahid on 28 October 1999.	Akbar Tandjung
14		Tosari Widjaja	6 December 1999	1 October 2004	PPP		Akbar Tandjung
14		Andi Mappetahang Fatwa	6 October 1999	1 October 2004	PAN		Akbar Tandjung
15		Soetardjo Soerjogoeritno	1 October 2004	1 October 2009	PDI-P		Agung Laksono
15		Muhaimin Iskandar	1 October 2004	1 October 2009	PKB		Agung Laksono
15		Zaenal Ma’arif	1 October 2004	9 January 2007	PBR	Removed from office following a polygamy scandal	Agung Laksono
16		Priyo Budi Santoso	1 October 2009	1 October 2014	Golkar		Marzuki Alie
16		Pramono Anung	1 October 2009	1 October 2014	PDI-P		Marzuki Alie
16		Anis Matta	1 October 2009	1 February 2013	PKS	Resigned after being elected as president of PKS	Marzuki Alie
16		Sohibul Iman	1 February 2013	1 October 2014	PKS		Marzuki Alie
16		Marwoto Mintohardjono	1 October 2009	3 January 2010	PAN	Died in office	Marzuki Alie
16		Taufik Kurniawan	2 March 2010	1 October 2014	PAN	Taufik Kurniawan was sworn in on 2 March 2010, replacing Marwoto Mintohardjono who died in office.	Marzuki Alie
17		Fadli Zon	2 October 2014	1 October 2019	Gerindra		Setya Novanto (2014–2015; 2016–2017); Ade Komarudin (2016); Bambang Soesatyo (2018–2019)
17		Agus Hermanto	2 October 2014	1 October 2019	Democratic Party		Setya Novanto (2014–2015; 2016–2017); Ade Komarudin (2016); Bambang Soesatyo (2018–2019)
17		Taufik Kurniawan	2 October 2014	1 October 2019	PAN		Setya Novanto (2014–2015; 2016–2017); Ade Komarudin (2016); Bambang Soesatyo (2018–2019)
17		Fahri Hamzah	2 October 2014	1 October 2019	PKS		Setya Novanto (2014–2015; 2016–2017); Ade Komarudin (2016); Bambang Soesatyo (2018–2019)
17		Utut Adianto	20 March 2018	1 October 2019	PDI-P	Appointed following a revision on the law for legislative bodies (RUU MD3)	Setya Novanto (2014–2015; 2016–2017); Ade Komarudin (2016); Bambang Soesatyo (2018–2019)
18		Azis Syamsuddin	1 October 2019	25 September 2021	Golkar		Puan Maharani
18		Lodewijk Freidrich Paulus	30 September 2021	1 October 2024	Golkar		Puan Maharani
18		Sufmi Dasco Ahmad	1 October 2019	1 October 2024	Gerindra		Puan Maharani
18		Rachmad Gobel	1 October 2019	1 October 2024	Nasdem		Puan Maharani
18		Muhaimin Iskandar	1 October 2019	1 October 2024	PKB		Puan Maharani
19		Sufmi Dasco Ahmad	1 October 2024	Incumbent	Gerindra		Puan Maharani
19		Saan Mustopa	1 October 2024	Incumbent	Nasdem		Puan Maharani
19		Adies Kadir	31 August 2025	Incumbent	Golkar		Puan Maharani
19		Cucun Ahmad Syamsurijal	1 October 2024	Incumbent	PKB		Puan Maharani

== See also ==
- House of Representatives
- List of speakers of the People's Representative Council
- List of speakers of the People's Consultative Assembly
- List of speakers of the Regional Representative Council of Indonesia
