= List of members of the Indonesian House of Representatives (1971–1977) =

The following is a list of all 460 members of the House of Representatives of the Republic of Indonesia for the period 1971–1977, resulting from the legislative elections held in 1971. Members of the House of Representatives were sworn in on 28 October 1992, and represented 10 different parties. Though this was until the merging of the parties in 1973, which resulted in only 3 parties being represented.

== Leadership ==
=== Speaker ===
Speaker
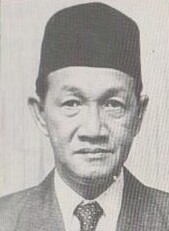
Idham Chalid
PPP (Note: Listed as a member of the United Development Party, though elected as a member of a different party)

=== Deputy speakers ===
Deputy Speaker	Deputy Speaker	Deputy Speaker	Deputy Speaker	Deputy Speaker
Sumiskum; Golkar	Jailani Naro; PPP (Note: Listed as a member of the United Development Party, though elected as a member of a different party)	Domo Pranoto; Military	Muhammad Sudjono; Military	Mohammad Isnaeni; PDI

== Members ==
=== By province ===
==== Central Java ====
#	Name	Photo	Constituency	Party (before merger)	Party (after merger)	Notes
1	Surjanto		Tegal	Golkar		
2	Ubaja Achmadi		Brebes	PSII	PPP	

==== Jakarta ====
#	Name	Photo	Constituency	Party (before merger)	Party (after merger)	Notes
1	Ischak Moro		Jakarta	PSII	PPP	
2	Thayeb Mohammad Gobel		Jakarta	PSII	PPP	Father of Rachmad Gobel
3	Wartomo Dwidjojuwono		Jakarta	PSII	PPP	
