= Lodewijk Freidrich Paulus =

Indonesian politician (born 1957)

Lieutenant General (Ret.) Lodewijk Freidrich Paulus
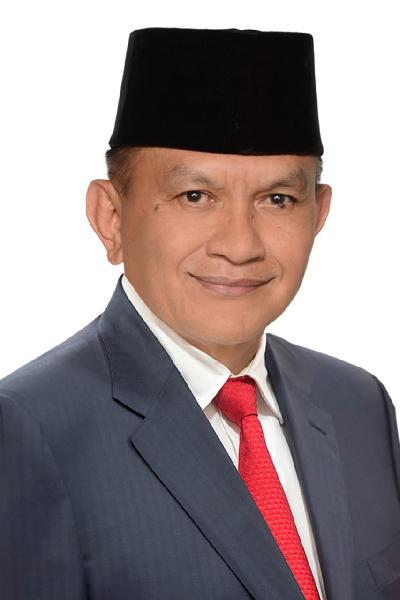

Deputy Coordinating Minister for Political and Security Affairs
- Incumbent
- Assumed office 21 October 2024
- President: Prabowo Subianto
- Minister: Budi Gunawan; Sjafrie Sjamsoeddin (acting); Djamari Chaniago
- Preceded by: Office established

Secretary General of the Golkar
- In office 22 January 2018 – 22 Agustus 2024
- Chairman: Airlangga Hartarto; Agus Gumiwang Kartasasmita (acting)
- Preceded by: Idrus Marham
- Succeeded by: Muhammad Sarmuji

First Deputy Speaker of the House of Representatives
- In office 30 September 2021 – 1 October 2024 Serving with Muhaimin Iskandar, Rachmad Gobel and Sufmi Dasco Ahmad
- Speaker: Puan Maharani
- Preceded by: Azis Syamsuddin
- Succeeded by: Adies Kadir

Member of the House of Representatives
- In office 1 October 2019 – 30 September 2024
- Preceded by: Dwie Aroem Hadiatie
- Succeeded by: Rycko Menoza
- Constituency: Lampung I

24th Commandant General of Kopassus
- In office 4 December 2009 – 8 September 2011
- Preceded by: Pramono Edhie Wibowo
- Succeeded by: Wisnu Bawa Tenaya

Personal details
- Born: Lodewijk Freidrich Paulus; 27 July 1957 (age 69) Manado, Indonesia
- Party: Golkar
- Spouse: Meria Agustina
- Children: 2
- Parents: Estefanus Jeremias (father); Len Bagij (mother)
- Education: Indonesian Military Academy

Military service
- Allegiance: Indonesia
- Branch/service: Indonesian Army
- Years of service: 1981–2015
- Rank: Lieutenant General
- Unit: Kopassus
- Commands: Kopassus
- Battles/wars: Operation Lotus; Insurgency in Aceh; Papua conflict

Lodewijk Freidrich Paulus (born 27 July 1957) is an Indonesian politician and a retired Lieutenant General who is former Deputy Speaker of the House of Representatives.

== Honours ==
As the officer at Indonesian Army, he has received several orders, decorations and awards, namely:

=== National Honours ===
- Star of Mahaputera, 2nd Class – 2024 (Note: Received the award while serving as minister of defense.)
- Star of Dharma – 2014
- Star of Yudha Dharma, 2nd Class – 2012
- Star of Kartika Eka Paksi, 2nd Class
- Star of Yudha Dharma, 3rd Class
- Star of Kartika Eka Paksi, 3rd Class – 2001
- Military Long Service Medal, 32 Years
- Active Duty in the Army Medal
- Military Long Service Medal, 24 Years
- Military Long Service Medal, 16 Years
- Military Long Service Medal, 8 Years
- Military Operation Service Medal in Aceh
- Satyalancana Ksatria Yudha
- Timor Military Campaign Medal w/ 2 gold star
- Military Instructor Service Medal
- Role Model Medal w/ 1 gold star
- Social Welfare Service Medal

== Personal life ==
Born into a Protestant Christian family, he converted to Islam during his time in the military.
