= Chozin Chumaidy =

Indonesian politician (1948–2025)

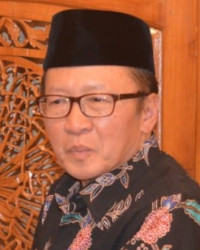

Ambassador of Indonesia to Lebanon
- In office 18 December 2014 – 31 December 2018
- President: Joko Widodo
- Preceded by: Dimas Samodra Rum
- Succeeded by: Hajriyanto

Member of House of Representatives
- In office 1 October 1992 – 1 October 2009
- Constituency: West Java (constituency) (1992–2004); West Java IX (2004–2009)

Member of West Java Regional House of Representatives
- In office 1977–1987

Personal details
- Born: Achmad Chozin Chumaidy; 8 October 1948 Pekalongan, West Java
- Died: 23 April 2025 (aged 76) Bandung, West Java
- Party: United Development Party
- Spouse: Fatmah
- Children: 4
- Education: Pondok Pesantren Tebuireng
- Alma mater: IAIN Sunan Gunung Djati (Drs.)

Achmad Chozin Chumaidy, or simply Chozin Chumaidy, is an Indonesian politician from the United Development Party. He served as the Indonesian ambassador to Lebanon from 2014 to 2018, a DPR-RI member for four terms from 1992 to 2019, and a West Java DPRD member from 1977 to 1987.

== Early life and education ==
Chozin was born in Pekalongan, West Java on 8 October 1948. He finished primary school at SDI Wonopringgo Pekalongan in 1961. He then continued his education at Pondok Pesantren Tebuireng, Jombang, East Java. He finished middle school education in 1964 and high school education in 1968.

He then went to the Muamalah study program at the IAIN Sunan Gunung Djati Faculty of Syariah, Bandung and graduated in 1975. In college, he was active in the Indonesian Islamic Student Movement (Indonesian: Pergerakan Mahasiswa Islam Indonesia, PMII) and served as the secretary-general (1970–1972) and the chairperson (1973–1975) of PMII Bandung. He was also the head of the Faculty of Syariah Senate of his college in 1970–1971.

== Career ==
He started his career by working as a lecturer on his alma mater, teaching at the IAIN Sunan Gunung Djati Faculty of Syariah from his 1975 graduation until 1981.

Besides, he was an activist in various youth and Islamic organizations, such as the Indonesian National Youth Committee (Indonesian: Komite Nasional Pemuda Indonesia, KNPI), Nahdlatul Ulama (NU), GP Ansor, and Majelis Ulama Indonesia (MUI). He held various important positions such as the KNPI Bandung Regional Leadership Council vice chairperson in 1974–1976, NU West Java Regional Leadership vice secretary in 1985–1990, and MUI West Java Leadership Council member in 1989–1994.

In the 1977 elections, he was elected as West Java DPRD member from the United Development Party. He was re-elected in the subsequent election, and served his second term until 1987.

After retiring from his position as a DPRD member, he returned to lecturing. He became a lecturer at the Bandung Development Technology Academy (1988–1992) and Unpad Faculty of Social and Political Sciences (1989–1992).

In the 1992 elections, he was elected as DPR-RI member from the United Development Party for the West Java constituency. He was assigned to Komisi II and the Steering Committee.

He was re-elected for the subsequent three terms (1997–1999, 1999–2004, and 2004–2009). In his third term, he was also assigned to the MPR-RI Working Body ad hoc committee II and became the vice chairperson of the DPR-RI United Development Party fraction.

For the 2004–2009 term, there was a reorganization of Indonesian constituencies, and he represented West Java IX after winning 30.980 votes.

Throughout his parliamentary career, he also held various roles in the United Development Party at the local or national level. He served as the West Java Vice Chairperson (1985–1990, 1995–1998), West Java Secretary (1990–1995), Central Leadership Council Vice Secretary (1998–2003), Central Leadership Council Vice General Secretary (2003–2007), and Central Leadership Council Vice Chairperson (2007–2011).
