= I Gusti Gde Subamia =

Indonesian politician (1921–1986)

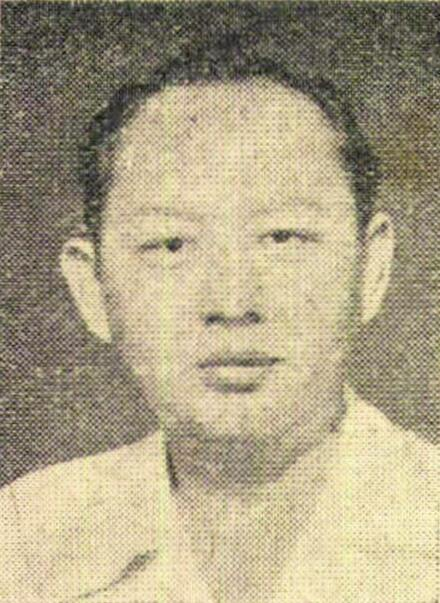
- Official portrait, 1956

Speaker of the People's Representative Council
- In office 26 February – 2 May 1966
- Preceded by: Arudji Kartawinata
- Succeeded by: Achmad Sjaichu

Deputy Speaker of the People's Representative Council
- In office 26 December 1960 – 26 February 1966

Member of the People's Representative Council
- In office 24 March 1956 – 16 June 1966

Personal details
- Born: 4 January 1921 Tabanan, Bali and Lombok Residency, Dutch East Indies
- Died: 31 December 1986 (aged 65) Tabanan, Bali, Indonesia
- Party: Indonesian National Party
- Other political affiliations: Indonesian People's Party (1946–1949)

I Gusti Gde Subamia (also spelled I Gusti Gede Subamia; 4 January 1921 – 31 December 1986), often shortened to I. G. G. Subamia, was an Indonesian politician who served as speaker of the People's Representative Council (DPR) from February to May 1966. A member of the Indonesian National Party (PNI), he served as a member of the DPR from his election in 1955 until his dismissal in June 1966. Born in Tabanan, Bali, on 4 May 1921, he began his career, as an assistant district head, before being elected to the Provincial Representative Council of Bali.

He was elected to the national legislature in the 1955 legislative elections, as a member of the PNI, and was inaugurated as a member on 24 March 1956. During President Sukarno's Guided Democracy, he was appointed deputy speaker of the DPR. He retained the position until 24 February 1966, when he was appointed as the speaker of the council, replacing Arudji Kartawinata. As speaker, he only held the position for less than three months, as the legislature's leadership was dissolved. He remained as a member of the DPR until his dismissal on 16 June 1966. Following his dismissal he returned to Tabanan, and died there on 31 December 1986.

== Early life and career ==
I Gusti Gde Subamia was born on 4 May 1921, in the town of Tabanan, in the island of Bali. Little is known of his early life, but he began his career as an assistant district head in 1940. During the Japanese occupation, he left the position of district head, and became police officer and customs officer in Giliamanuk, and later his hometown of Tabanan. In 1946, following the proclamation of independence and the beginning of the national revolution, he became a clerk and moved to Denpasar.

== Political career ==
It was during the national revolution, when he began his career. Being selected as the Deputy Chairman of the Great Indonesia Party (Parindra). On 2 July 1947, he was arrested by the Netherlands Indies Civil Administration (NICA). He was held in captivity for two years, until his release on 31 July 1949. In August 1949, he left Parindra, and formed his own political party, the Indonesian National Movement (GNI). The party was short lived, however, and it eventually joined the Indonesian National Party (PNI) in December of the same year, with Subamia also becoming a member. Following the disestablishment of the Balinese systems of government, including the council of kings, a new provincial legislative body was established, known as the Regional People's Representative Council of Bali. He was appointed to the body, and took office on 1 September 1950, together with I Gusti Made Mudra, I Wayan Dangin, Suteja, and I Gusti Bagis Sugwira.

In the 1955 legislative elections, he was elected to the national legislature (DPR) in the constituency of West Nusa Tenggara, and was inaugurated on 24 March 1956. He retained the position of President Sukarno dissolved the legislature. During Sukarno's Guided Democracy, he was appointed deputy speaker of the DPR, on 26 December 1960. He retained the position until 24 February 1966, when he was appointed as the speaker of the council, replacing then-speaker Arudji Kartawinata, who retired. As speaker, he only held the position for less than three months, as the legislature's leadership was dissolved by Sukarno. He remained as a member of the DPR until his dismissal on 16 June 1966. Following his dismissal he returned to Tabanan, and died there on 31 December 1986.
