= Azis Syamsuddin =

Indonesian politician (born 1970)

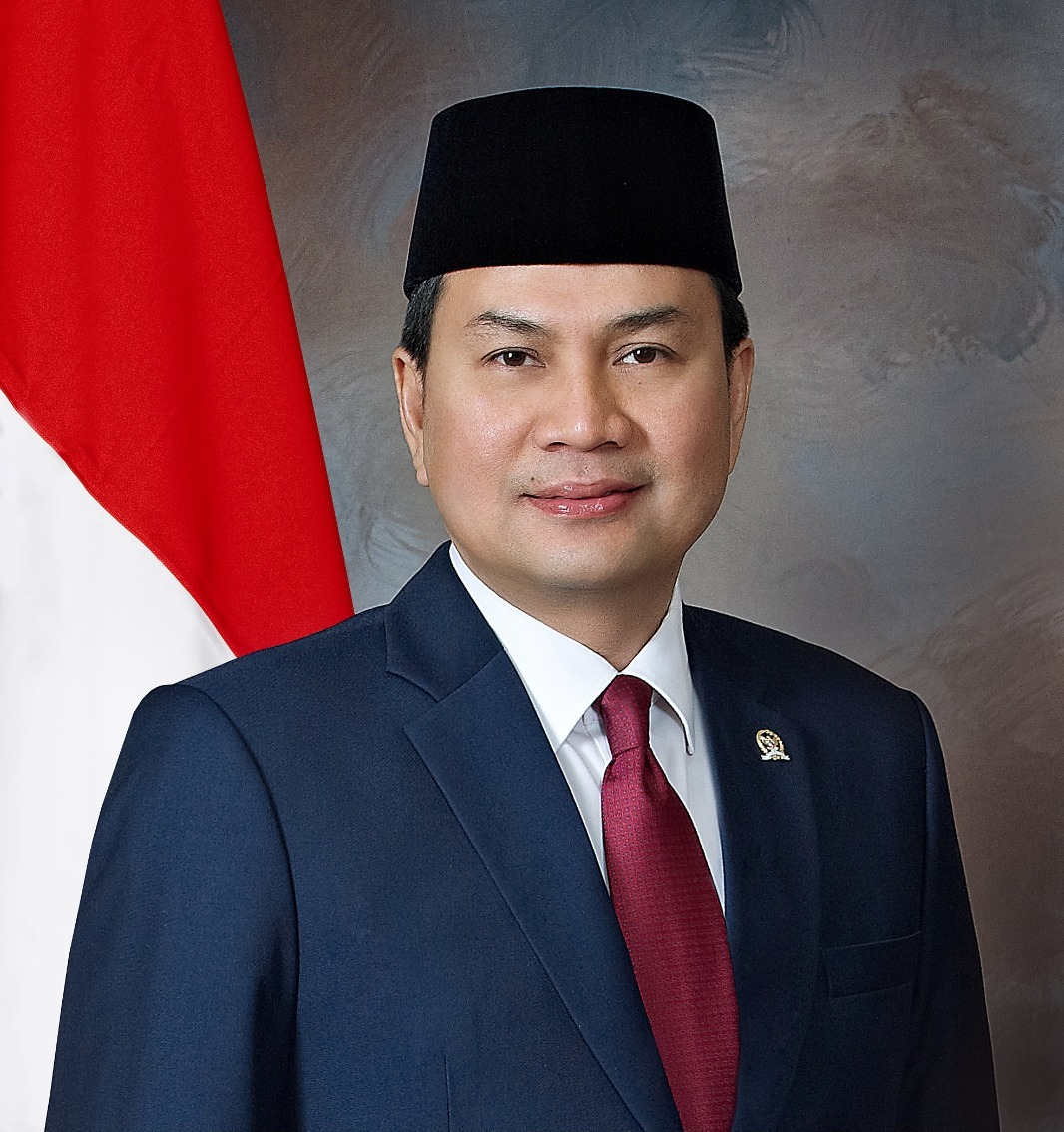

First Deputy Speaker of the People's Representative Council
- In office 1 October 2019 – 25 September 2021 Serving with Sufmi Dasco Ahmad, Rachmad Gobel, and Muhaimin Iskandar
- Speaker: Puan Maharani
- Succeeded by: Lodewijk Freidrich Paulus

Member of the People's Representative Council
- In office 1 October 2004 – 25 September 2021
- Constituency: Lampung II

Personal details
- Born: 31 July 1970 (age 56) Jakarta, Indonesia
- Party: Golkar
- Education: Trisakti University; University of Western Sydney; Padjadjaran University

Azis Syamsuddin (born 31 July 1970) is an Indonesian politician who served as First Deputy Speaker of the People's Representative Council from 2019 to 2021.

== Education ==
Syamsuddin initially studied in but he completed high school in Padang, West Sumatra. He obtained a bachelor's in economics from Krisnadwipayana University and a bachelor's in law from Trisakti University. He later received a master's in finance from the University of Western Sydney in 1999, and a master's and a doctorate in law from Padjadjaran University.

== Career ==
In 1992, he began to work for AIA Group, but after less than a year he moved to the banking industry, joining Panin Bank. He only stayed in the bank for around 1.5 years, before moving to practice law, joining the law firm Gani Djemat & Partners. He would eventually become a managing partner there.

=== Legislator ===
Syamsuddin ran for a legislative seat in the 2004 legislative election under Golkar, where he had been active within Golkar's office in Tulang Bawang Regency. He ran to represent Lampung's 2nd electoral district, and after being elected was assigned to the third commission of the People's Representative Council (DPR), which worked on law, human rights, and security. He became the commission's deputy-chair in his first term.

On 25 January 2016, Syamsuddin's was replaced as chair of the third commission by Bambang Soesatyo. Syamsuddin then became head of DPR's budgetary body in February 2017, until he returned to chair the third commission in June 2019. Following the resignation of Setya Novanto as speaker, Syamsuddin was initially to take up his position, but following a rejection by a majority of Golkar legislators, Syamsuddin was not made speaker.

Following the 2019 election, Syamsuddin was appointed as Deputy Speaker of DPR. In 2022, he was sentenced to three and a half years in prison for bribing a lawyer.

On 25 September 2021, he was arrested by the Corruption Eradication Commission.
