= House of Representatives (Indonesia, 1997–1999) =

14th House of Representatives of Indonesia
←	1992–1997	1999–2004	→
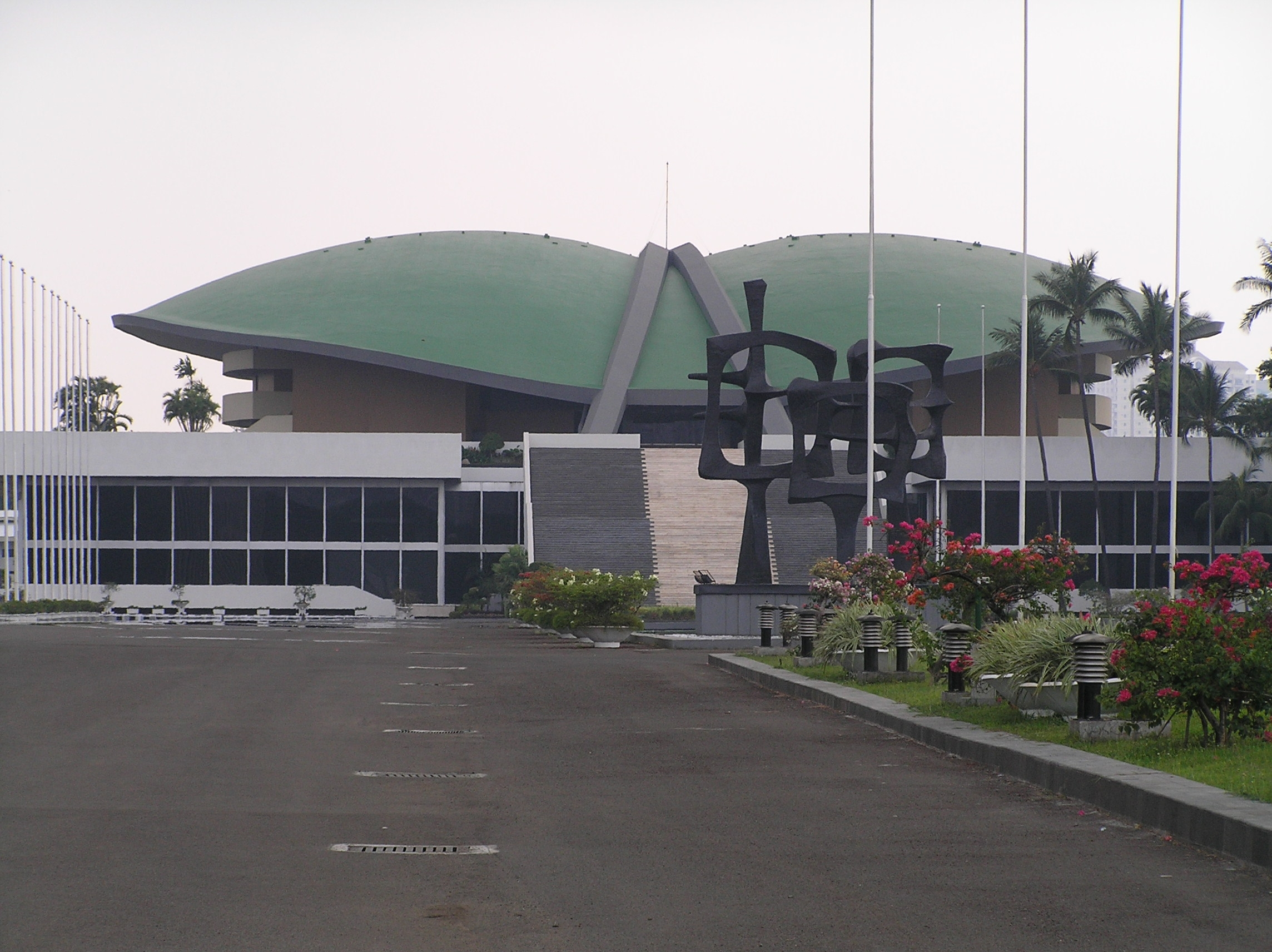
- DPR/MPR Building (2008)

Overview
- Legislative body: House of Representatives (Indonesia)
- Meeting place: DPR/MPR Building, Jakarta
- Term: 1 October 1997 – 30 September 1999
- Election: 1997 Indonesian legislative election
- Speaker: Harmoko (Golkar)
- Deputy Speaker: Fatimah Achmad (PDI)
- Deputy Speaker: Ismail Hasan Metareum (PPP)
- Deputy Speaker: Abdul Gafur (Golkar)
- Deputy Speaker: Syarwan Hamid (1997-1998); Hari Sabarno (1998-1999)(Military)

The 14th House of Representatives, consisting of the Golkar, PDI, PPP, and the military fraction, elected in 1997, was the last House of Representatives (DPR) during the New Order Era. The legislative convened for only two years, and was the second shortest DPR, second only to the Transitional House of Representatives.

The 14th DPR also participated in the downfall of Suharto, with the speaker of the DPR, Harmoko, frequently urged the president to step down.
