= Cucun Ahmad Syamsurijal =

Indonesian politician (born 1972)

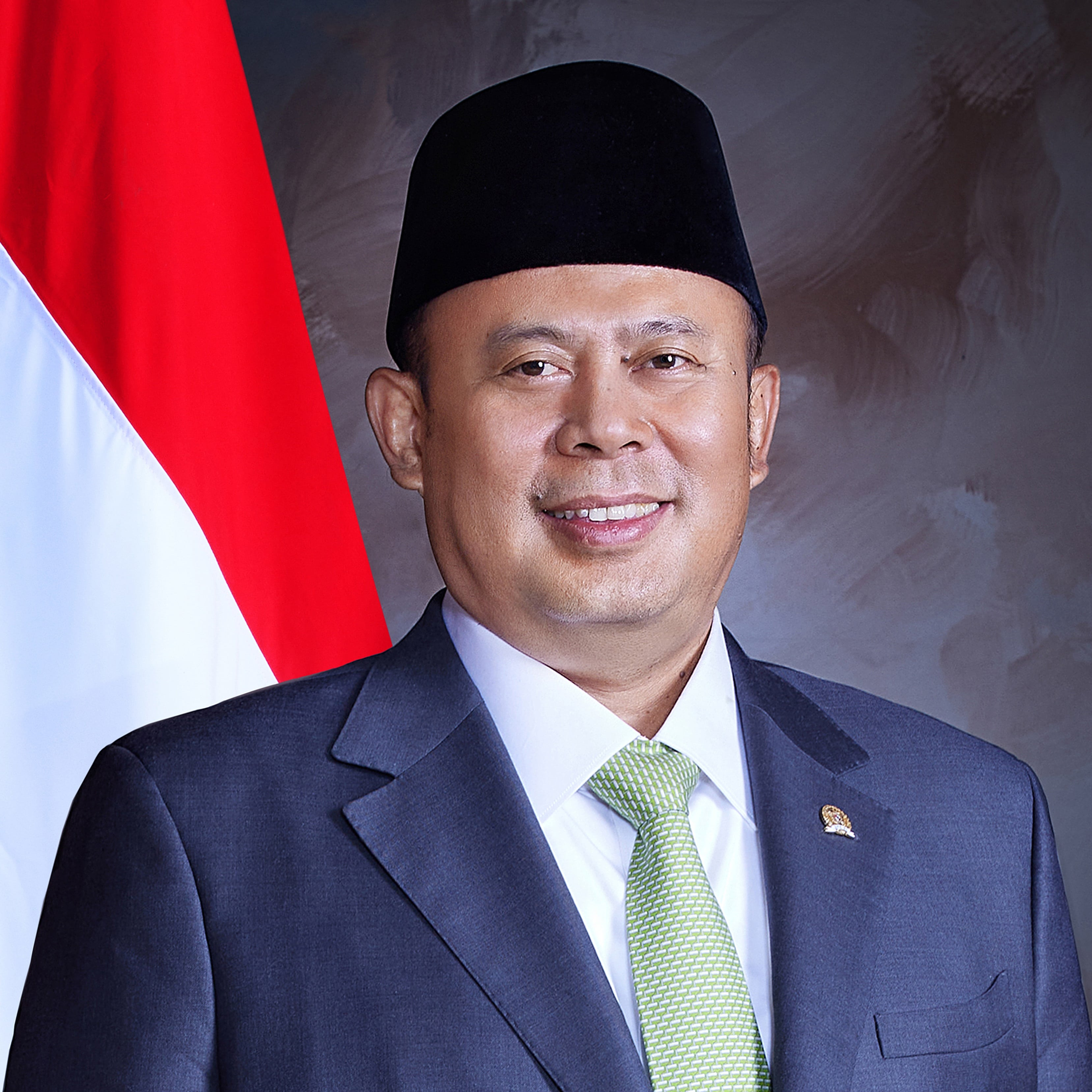
- Official portrait, 2024

Deputy Speaker of the House of Representatives
- Incumbent
- Assumed office 1 October 2024 Serving with 3 other people
- Speaker: Puan Maharani
- Preceded by: Muhaimin Iskandar

Member of the House of Representatives
- Incumbent
- Assumed office 1 October 2014
- Vote count: 267.788 votes (2024)
- Parliamentary group: National Awakening Party faction
- Constituency: West Java II

Personal details
- Born: Cucun Ahmad Syamsurijal; 8 November 1972 (age 53) Bandung, West Java, Indonesia
- Party: National Awakening Party
- Spouse: Eneng Sumiati
- Children: 4
- Education: Cipasung Islamic Institute; Padjadjaran University
- Website: Website

Cucun Ahmad Syamsurijal (born 8 November 1972), is an Indonesian politician who has been deputy speaker of the House of Representatives since 2024, and a member of the House of Representatives since 2014. He is a member of the National Awakening Party and served as its treasurer in West Java and chair in the Bandung Regency.

== Early life and education ==
Cucun Ahmad Syamsurijal was born in Bandung, Indonesia, on 11 August 1972. He was educated at MIN Sutam from 1979 to 1985, Ciparay 2 State Middle School from 1985 to 1989, and Cipasung Islamic High School from 1988 to 1991. He graduated from the Cipasung Islamic Institute with a bachelor's degree in religion after attended from 1991 to 1996, and from Padjadjaran University after attending from 2016 to 2018.

== Career ==
In West Java Cucun was deputy treasurer of the National Awakening Party (PKB) from 2005 to 2010, and general treasurer from 2008 to 2011. The PKB in the Bandung Regency was chaired by Cucun from 2010 to 2015.

Cucun was elected to the House of Representatives as a PKB candidate in the West Java II constituency. Cucun was secretary of the PKB's house delegation from 2015 to 2017, and chair from 2017 to 2024. Cucun was nominated by the PKB as one of the Deputy Speakers of the house.

Cucun left the inauguration of Didi Sukyadi as rector of the Indonesia University of Education in protest of the oath being conducted in English. He stated that conducting the oath in English was in violation of laws which required the Indonesian language to be used.

== Personal life ==
Cucun is a Muslim.

== Political positions ==
Cucun was critical of plans to increase the value-added tax in 2024.

== Works cited ==
=== News ===
- "Alasan Cucun Tinggalkan Acara Pelantikan Rektor". CNN. 15 June 2025. Archived from the original on 4 July 2025.
- "Cucun Ahmad Syamsurijal Khawatir Kenaikan PPN Berikan Efek Domino Bagi Kesejahteraan Rakyat". Jontrasaceh. 19 November 2024. Archived from the original on 4 July 2025.
- Guritno, Tatang (1 October 2024). "PKB Ajukan Cucun Ahmad Syamsurijal jadi Wakil Ketua DPR". Kompas. Archived from the original on 4 July 2025.

=== Web ===
- "Profile". Cucun Ahmad Syamsurijal. Archived from the original on 15 August 2018.
- "H. Cucun Ahmad Syamsurijal, M.A.P." House of Representatives. Archived from the original on 25 October 2021.
