= Kharis Suhud =

Indonesian diplomat (1925–2012)

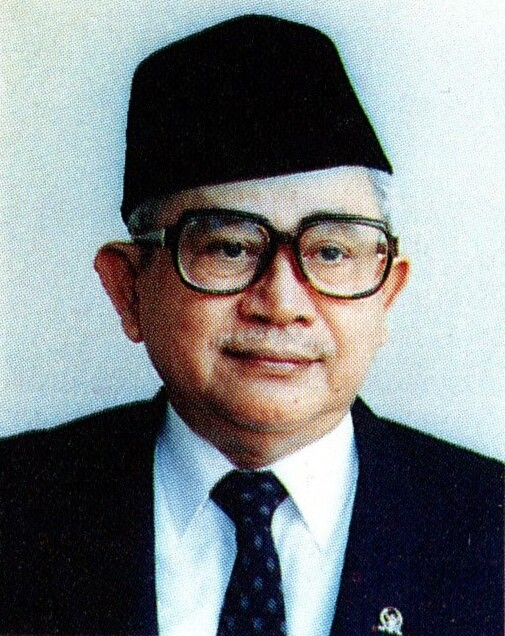
- Official portrait, 1992

7th Speaker of the People's Consultative Assembly
- In office 1 October 1987 – 30 September 1992
- Preceded by: Amir Machmud
- Succeeded by: Wahono

10th Speaker of the House of Representatives
- In office 1 October 1987 – 30 September 1992
- Preceded by: Amir Machmud
- Succeeded by: Wahono

Personal details
- Born: Mohammad Kharis Suhud; 10 April 1925 Madiun, Indonesia
- Died: 20 August 2012 (aged 87) Jakarta, Indonesia
- Resting place: Kalibata Heroes' Cemetery
- Party: Golkar
- Spouse: Sri Sukardi (m. 1950)
- Occupation: Politician; army officer

Military service
- Allegiance: Indonesia
- Branch/service: Indonesian Army
- Years of service: 1945–1980
- Rank: Lieutenant general
- Unit: Infantry
- Service no.: 11919

Mohammad Kharis Suhud (10 April 1925 – 20 August 2012), more commonly known as Kharis Suhud, was an Indonesian military official and politician, who served as the 9th Speaker of the People's Consultative Assembly from 1987 until 1992. Previously, he served as the 10th Deputy Speaker of the People's Consultative Assembly from 1982 until 1987, Chairman of the Indonesian Armed Forces from 1971 until 1974, and the Indonesian Ambassador to Thailand from 1975 until 1978.

Mohammad Kharis Suhud, was born on 10 April 1925, in Madiun, East Java.

== Health and death ==
Kharis Suhud's health began to decline in around early 2012. In March, he was treated intensively at Pertamina Central Hospital. Kharis Suhud died on 20 August 2012, on 00:36 WIB, at the age of 87 years, due to medical complications. He was buried at the Kalibata Heroes' Cemetery at 13.00 WIB. A number of New Order officials appeared at the funeral home, including former Jakarta Governor Soerjadi Soedirdja, former Kopassus Commander General Widjoyo Suyono, economic observer Sri Edi Swasono, and Coordinating Minister for Political and Security Affairs Djoko Suyanto.

== Personal life ==
Kharis Suhud married a woman named Sri Sukardi in 1950. Together, they had 4 children, Sri Julianti, Harry Santoso, Eddy Sarosa, and Djoko Santoso. Sukardi died in 2005.

== Honors ==
=== National honors ===
Indonesia:

- Star of Mahaputera, 1st Class (Indonesian: Bintang Mahaputera Adipurna)

Political offices
Preceded by Amir Machmud	Speaker of the People's Consultative Assembly; Speaker of the House of Representatives; 1987–1992	Succeeded by Wahono
