= Sartono =

Indonesian politician and lawyer (1900–1968)

Raden Mas Sartono
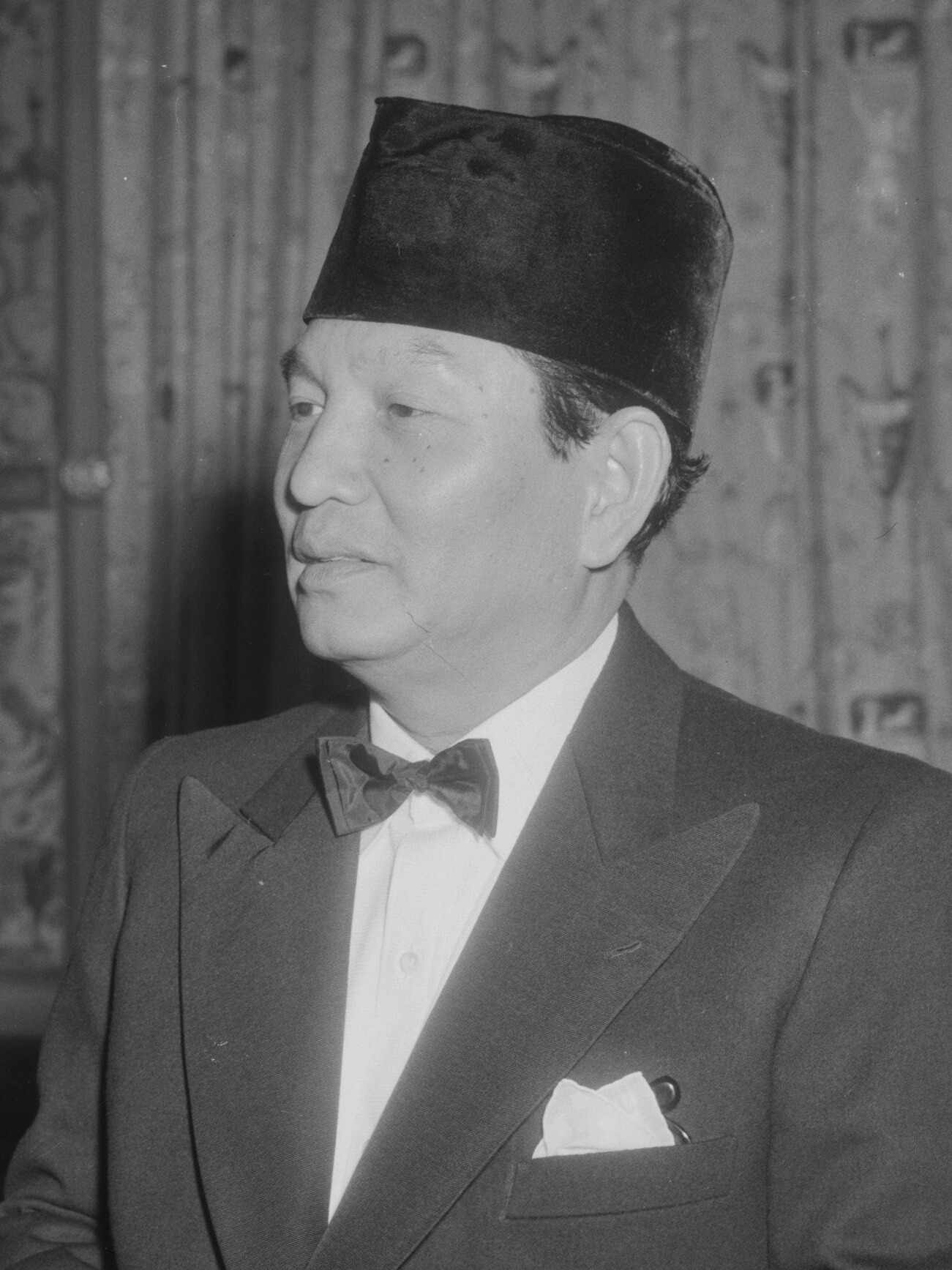
- Sartono in 1954

Speaker of the House of Representatives
- In office 22 February 1950 – 24 June 1960
- Preceded by: Office established
- Succeeded by: Zainul Arifin

Minister of State
- In office 19 August 1945 – 14 November 1945
- President: Sukarno
Legislative offices
Member of the House of Representatives
In office 15 February 1950 – 24 June 1960
Constituency	Central Java (1956–1959)
Member of the Central Indonesian National Committee
In office 29 August 1945 – 15 February 1950
Advisory offices
Deputy Chair of the Supreme Advisory Council
In office 6 March 1962 – 14 February 1968
Chair	Sukarno (1962–1966); Johannes Leimena (1966–1968); Muhammad Dahlan (1966–1968)
Preceded by	Ruslan Abdulgani
Succeeded by	Muhammad Ilyas
Member of the Supreme Advisory Council
In office 6 March 1962 – 14 February 1968
Appointed by	Sukarno
Constituency	Intellectuals

Personal details
- Born: 5 August 1900 Wonogiri, Dutch East Indies (present-day Indonesia)
- Died: 15 October 1968 (aged 68) Jakarta, Indonesia
- Resting place: Astana Bibis Luhur
- Party: Indonesian National Party
- Other political affiliations: Partindo (1931–1936); Gerindo (1937–1942); Serindo (1945–1946)
- Spouse: Siti Zaenab (m. 1930)
- Education: Leiden University (Mr.)

Raden Mas Sartono (5 August 1900 – 15 October 1968) was an Indonesian politician and lawyer who served as the inaugural speaker of the House of Representatives from 1950 until his resignation in 1960. During his career in government, Sartono also served as a cabinet minister, acting president, and vice chairman of the Supreme Advisory Council (DPA) under President Sukarno. He was also active in the Indonesian nationalist movement.

Born into a Javanese family of noble descent, Sartono studied law at Leiden University. During his studies, he became a member of the Perhimpoenan Indonesia association. After graduating, Sartono worked as an advocate and helped found the Indonesian National Party (PNI) in 1927. He unsuccessfully defended the party's leaders when they were arrested by the colonial government. In 1931, Sartono founded a new party, Partindo, which sought to achieve Indonesian independence through mass action and non-cooperation, but repression from the colonial government led to its dissolution in 1936. He then helped found another party, Gerindo, which advocated for self-determination and the creation of an Indonesian parliament.

Following the successful Japanese invasion in 1942, Gerindo would be dissolved and Sartono briefly left politics. During the Japanese occupation, he returned to politics and was involved in the Central Advisory Council and Putera organizations, both of which were Japanese-sponsored. He also became a member of the Investigating Committee for Preparatory Work for Independence. After the Proclamation of Indonesian Independence in 1945, he was appointed a state minister in the Presidential Cabinet. As minister, he was dispatched to the Yogyakarta Sultanate and Surakarta Sunanate to strengthen support for the Indonesian government there. During the subsequent Indonesian National Revolution, Sartono became a member of a re-established PNI, served in the Central Indonesian National Committee, and advised the Indonesian delegation of the Dutch–Indonesian Round Table Conference.

In February 1950, Sartono was elected as the first speaker of the House of Representatives (DPR), though it was then the DPR of the United States of Indonesia (RIS). He would go on to serve as DPR speaker for the next ten years, including for the entirety of the liberal democracy period. Following the dissolution of the RIS, Sartono would be re-elected as speaker of a new Provisional DPR (which replaced the DPR-RIS). In 1951, after the collapse of the Natsir Cabinet, Sartono was appointed formateur and tasked with forming a new cabinet. However, he failed to do so after less than a month of negotiations and was forced to return his mandate. He also briefly resigned in March 1956 after a bill—which he opposed—on the Netherlands-Indonesia Union was passed by the DPR.

Following the 1955 Indonesian elections, Sartono would be re-elected as DPR speaker. During this time, he served as acting president several times when Sukarno went on overseas trips. In 1959, the Constitution of 1945 was re-adopted by presidential decree, marking the rise of authoritarianism and Guided Democracy. In 1960, the DPR was suspended by Sukarno after it voted against the government budget; Sartono subsequently resigned. After his resignation, he refused to take public office for a few years. Eventually, he accepted an offer to serve as vice chairman of the DPA in 1962. However, he found it to be disappointing and resigned from the DPA in 1967. Thereafter, he left politics entirely and died in 1968. Since his death, there have been proposals to declare him a National Hero of Indonesia.

== Early life and career ==
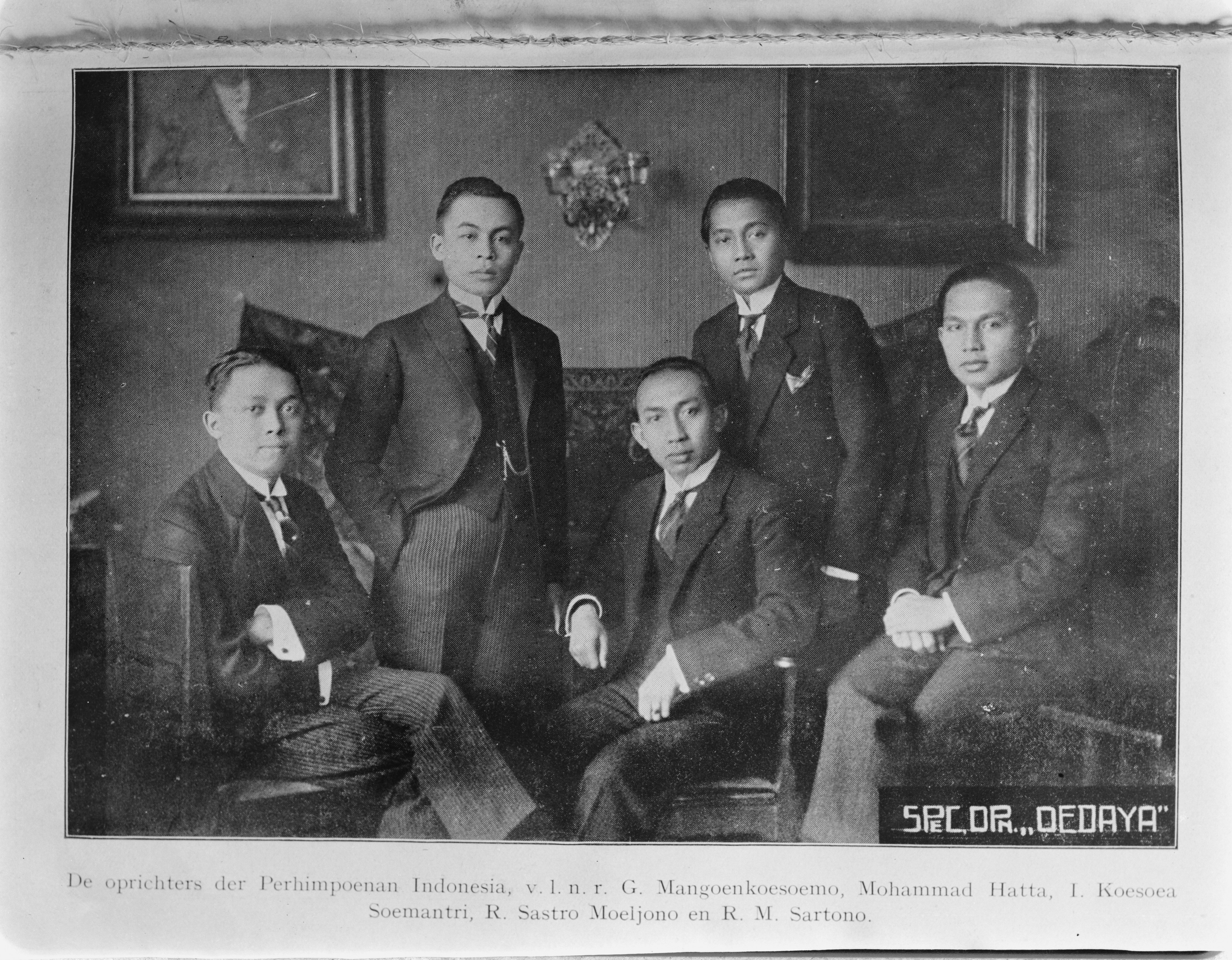
Sartono (on the far right), as a student in the Netherlands

Sartono was born in Wonogiri, near what is today Surakarta, on 5 August 1900. Born to a noble ethnic-Javanese family, he was the second oldest of seven children. His father, Raden Mas Martodikarjo, was a civil servant who was a descendant of Prince Mangkunegara II. His mother was a noblewomen, who was a descendant of Prince Mangkunegara III. In 1906, he left Wonogiri and began his education at the Europeesche Lagere School in Surakarta, a school only for children of noble descent. There, he graduated in 1913, with the highest grade. After graduating, he was accepted to the Meer Uitgebreid Lager Onderwijs (MULO) school also in Surakarta. Sartono spent three years in MULO, from 1913 until 1916, and after graduating, he left for Batavia. In Batavia, he entered the School tot Opleiding voor Inlandsche Rechtskundigen, later known as the Rechts School, a law institute for the native Indonesian nobility.

At Rechts School, he joined the Tri Koro Dharmo organization, a youth organization of Budi Utomo, which later evolved into Jong Java. In 1921, he passed in his law examination, and received the title of "rechtskundige" (jurist). After graduating, he became a civil servant at the District Court in Surakarta for around six months. In September 1922, Sartono left his job as a civil servant, and departed to the Netherlands, to study for a doctorate in law at Leiden University, along with his former classmate Iwa Koesoemasoemantri. The pair departed from Surakarta to the port of Tanjung Priok, the main hub for transportation from the colony to Europe. They arrived in Genoa, Italy, before taking the train to the Netherlands. During his studies in Leiden, he joined the Perhimpoenan Indonesia association, and became the associations secretary from 1922 until 1925.

== Early political career ==
After completing his studies, Sartono returned to the Indies in 1925, and opened a law practice in the city of Bandung, together with his friends from Leiden (including Iskaq Tjokrohadisurjo, Budiarto Martoatmodjo, and Soenario). The young advocates were successful in handling the legal actions of Dutch authorities. One notable case they handled was the trial of a man named Jasin, who was a train conductor from Tasikmalaya. Jasin was accused of being part of the failed 1926 communist revolt. As a result of Sartono's defense, Jasin's punishment was lightened, but he was still found guilty, and exiled to the Boven-Digoel concentration camp, in West New Guinea. Sartono later participated in the founding of the Indonesian National Party (PNI) at Bandung on 4 July 1927. Following the 1929 PNI congress in Yogyakarta, he was appointed as treasurer of the party. He also became the legal adviser during the second Indonesian youth congress in 1928 – which resulted in the Youth Pledge.

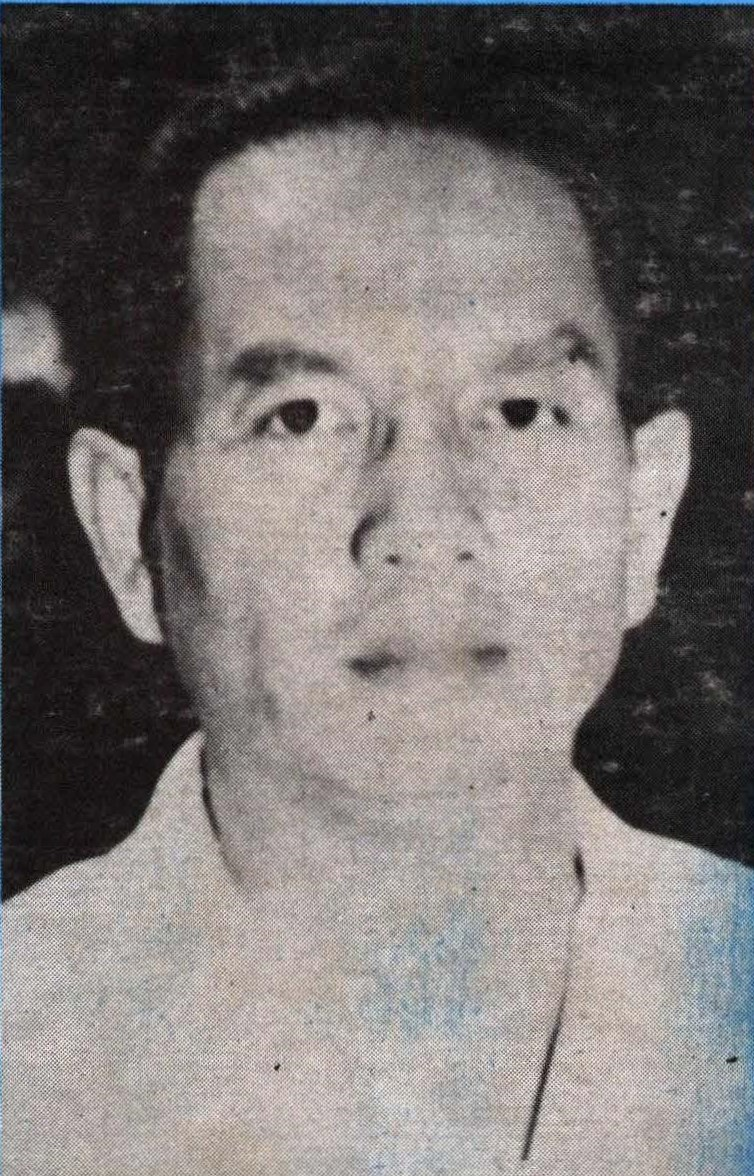
Portrait of Sartono, date unknown

In 1930, the Dutch colonial government arrested four of the PNI's leaders, and later sentenced them to prison time. Sartono was not arrested, and instead he became one of Sukarno's defense lawyers during Sukarno's trials in Bandung. In 1931, Sartono founded the Partindo party, after the disbanding of the PNI. During his leadership of Partindo, he created a department for labor unions, which Sartono directly managed. Despite this, Sartono argued that labor unions should not engage in politics. Sartono led Partindo until 1933, when the released Sukarno was elected the party chief and Sartono became his deputy. Around the same period, the Swadeshi movement in Colonial India began capturing the attention of the many politically active Indonesians. This included Sartono, who became an advocate for the movement, and also chaired a commission on the movement within Partindo.

After Sukarno's election as leader, however, Sukarno's view that labor unions should be associated with political parties became dominant – and in 1933, the party's official position became that labor unions must be based on political parties. Partindo was again disbanded in 1937, and Sartono further took part in the founding of another party, Gerindo, where he was deputy chief under Amir Syarifuddin. He also remained a lawyer, successfully defending another nationalist Kasman Singodimedjo in a 1940 case. Following the successful Japanese invasion of Indonesia, Sartono briefly left politics and handled rubber plantations in the Bogor region. He was also head of the organizational section of the Japan-founded labor organization Putera and a member of the Javanese Central Advisory Council, also set up the occupation government. In 1945, he was appointed as a member of the Investigating Committee for Preparatory Work for Independence. For some time, he was also the adviser to the Japanese Department of Internal Affairs between December 1944 until June 1945.

== National revolution ==
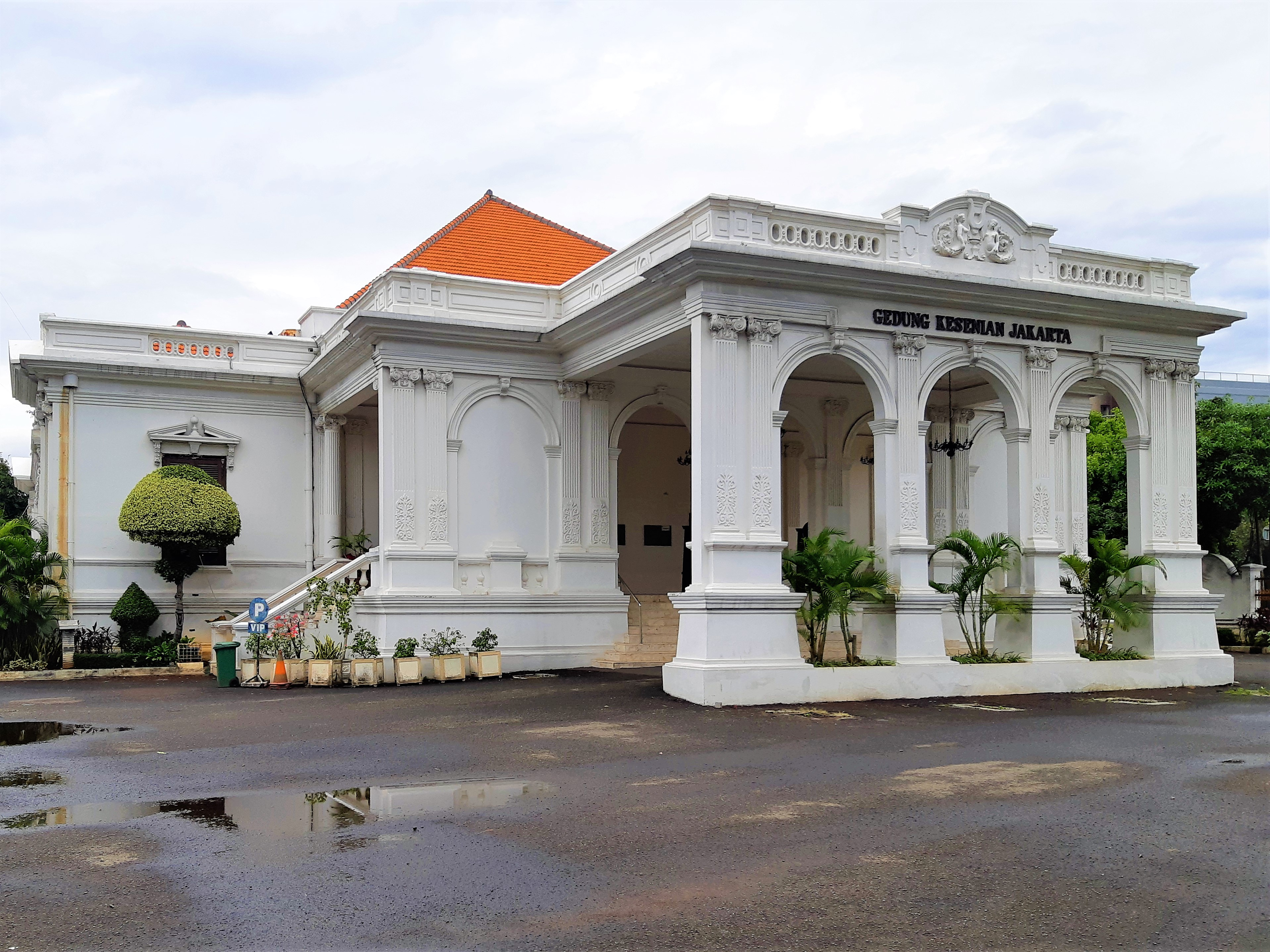
The Jakarta Art Building (pictured in 2018), where the Central Indonesian National Committee first convened in

Shortly after the proclamation of Indonesian independence, Sartono was appointed as one of five ministers of state (alongside Oto Iskandar di Nata, Mohammad Amir, Wahid Hasyim, and A.A. Maramis). Sartono and Maramis were dispatched to Central Java's traditional monarchies (the Surakarta Sunanate and Yogyakarta Sultanate) to give assurances that the monarchies would remain in exchange for support of the new nationalist government. On 19 August 1945, he took part in a meeting which resulted in the agreement to form the Central Indonesian National Committee (KNIP). Sartono also rejoined the reformed Sukarno-led PNI. The party had significant internal issues due to personal and ideological differences of its members, with Mohammad Hatta remarking in an interview with Irish historian Benedict Anderson that Sartono and Abikusno Tjokrosujoso had internal conflicts almost immediately after its founding.

In December 1945, he became chief of the political department of a further restructured PNI. Sartono was a member of the KNIP and was part of its leadership until October 1945, when the leadership was replaced by a new group of younger members. Later, he would return to the leadership positions, becoming deputy chair of the body's Working Committee (which ran day-to-day affairs) by January 1947. He lost the position in an election in April 1947, but was voted back in July 1949. He left the body in 1949 as he joined the People's Representative Council of the United States of Indonesia (DPR-RIS). He had been appointed as the head of a good offices mission to the State of East Indonesia in December 1948, but the mission was cancelled. During the Dutch–Indonesian Round Table Conference, Sartono also served as a general adviser for the Indonesian delegation.

== Post-Independence career ==
=== Early speakership: 1950–1956 ===
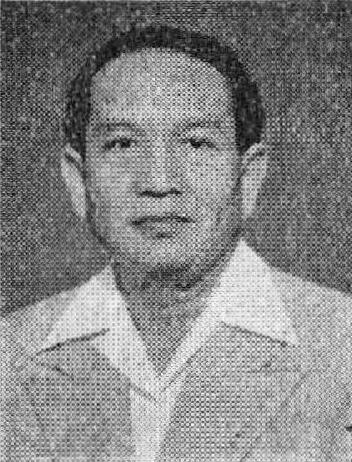
Official portrait as a member of the People's Representative Council, c. 1956

Following the Dutch recognition of Indonesian sovereignty, Sartono joined the DPR-RIS, and was elected as the body's speaker on 21 February 1950, after defeating Mohammad Yamin and Albert Mangaratua Tambunan in the leadership vote, taking office the following day. Six months later, on 16 August, the body was dissolved as the United States of Indonesia was transformed into a unitary state, and all its members became members of the newly formed Provisional People's Representative Council (DPRS). Sartono was again elected speaker of the body on its 19 August leadership vote. Sartono was appointed as formateur for the government cabinet on 28 March 1951 following the fall of the Natsir Cabinet, and he attempted to form a coalition government between the PNI and the Masyumi. However, his efforts were thwarted due to policy differences between the two parties - namely, on taxation, local government, and the West New Guinea dispute.

This was made worse by Sartono's unwillingness to become the prime minister or any cabinet minister. His failure led to him returning his mandate after less than a month on 18 April. The task was then assigned to Soekiman Wirjosandjojo and Sidik Djojosukarto – who managed to form the Sukiman Cabinet. During the Wilopo Cabinet period, Sartono called for the resignation of Hamengkubuwono IX as Defense Minister in the aftermath of the 17 October affair. Due to the government dysfunction caused by constant tensions between government and opposition parties in the parliament, Sartono went as far as to warn legislators in December 1953 that the parliament may be dissolved if tensions continued to increase. By 1955, the election saw highly divisive campaigning, and Sartono made a public statement asking political parties to "not forget good manners" when referring to one another.

=== Later speakership: 1956–1960 ===
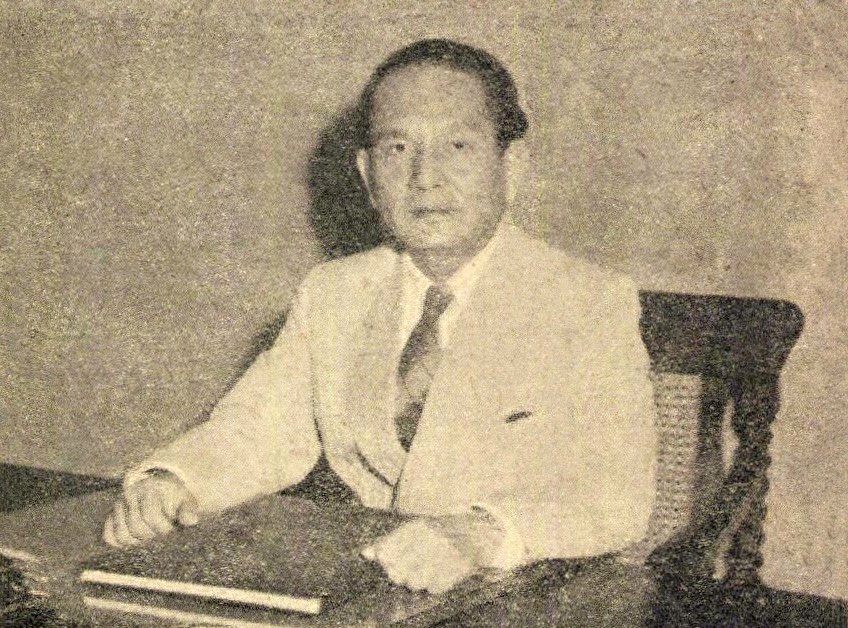
Official portrait as speaker, c. 1956

In 1956, there were proposals in the parliament to dissolve the Netherlands-Indonesian Union. A draft law was brought up during a 28 February 1956 meeting of the body, and following a vote it was accepted as agenda in the day's meeting. Sartono, who disagreed with the draft's inclusion, declared his resignation from speakership and walked out of the building, followed by his deputy Arudji Kartawinata and the PNI faction. On 1 March, members of the PNI, the Indonesian Islamic Union Party and the PKI, in addition to some members of the Nahdlatul Ulama submitted their resignations as members of the parliament. Still in March, Sartono secured a seat representing Central Java in the new People's Representative Council (DPR) as a result of the 1955 election. Members of the body were sworn in on 20 March 1956, with the DPRS being dissolved, and Sartono was again elected as speaker.

Following the resignation of Mohammad Hatta from his post as vice president (leaving it vacant until 1973), Sartono was legally second in the presidential line of succession, and he conducted presidential duties for three brief periods during his tenure - in December 1957, between 6 January and 21 February 1959, and between 21 April and 2 July 1959. On 23 July 1959, following President Sukarno's 1959 Decree, and the return to the 1945 Constitution, Sartono was sworn again as the speaker of the further renewed DPR. The DPR was eventually suspended by Sukarno on 24 June 1960 (though it met last on 5 March), ending Sartono's tenure as speaker. After the DPR was suspended, Sartono did not take public office for several years. Allegedly, he refused all positions offered to him, though in one occasion he implied to Foreign Minister Subandrio that he would accept an ambassadorship for an African country – with the condition that Subandrio himself and Mohammad Yamin were both also assigned to similar positions.

== Death and legacy ==
After several years of being unemployed, Sartono accepted an offer by Sukarno to serve in the Supreme Advisory Council (DPA), as the body's vice speaker in 1962. Throughout his time in the parliament – and during his time at DPA – Sartono pushed with little success laws meant to strengthen the government's financial accountability. American scholar Daniel Lev wrote that Sartono's experience in the body "was a great disappointment to him". He eventually resigned from the DPA and left politics entirely in 1967. He died in Jakarta on 15 October 1968, and was buried in Surakarta. According to author and historian, Nyak Wali Alfa Tirta, Sartono was a quiet, but well liked person, by both his opponents and friends. The city government of Surakarta, along with the Mangkunegaran family foundation, have campaigned to make Sartono a National Hero of Indonesia. A street in the city of Malang is named after him.

Political offices
Preceded by Office established	Speaker of the House of Representatives; 1950–1960	Succeeded by Zainul Arifin
