= Harsono Tjokroaminoto =

Indonesian political figure (1912–1992)

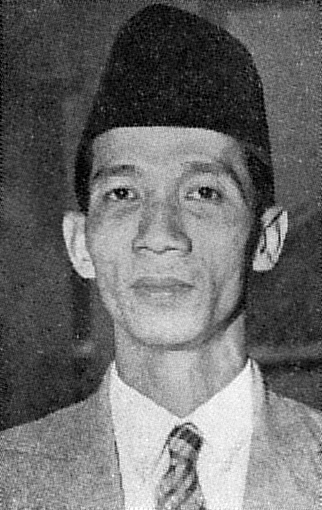

5th Ambassador of Indonesia to Switzerland
- In office March 1972 – March 1975
- President: Suharto
- Preceded by: Mappa Oudang
- Succeeded by: Tjokorda Ngurah Wim Sukawati

1st Minister of State Apparatus Utilization and Bureaucratic Reform
- In office 10 June 1968 – 11 September 1971
- President: Suharto
- Preceded by: None
- Succeeded by: Emil Salim

9th Deputy Prime Minister of Indonesia
- In office 12 August 1955 – 24 March 1956 Co-leading with Djanoe Ismadi
- President: Sukarno
- Prime Minister: Burhanuddin Harahap
- Preceded by: Zainul Arifin; Wongsonegoro
- Succeeded by: Mohamad Roem; Idham Chalid

Deputy Minister of Defense
- In office 2 October 1946 – 27 June 1947
- President: Sukarno
- Prime Minister: Sutan Sjahrir
- Preceded by: Arudji Kartawinata
- Succeeded by: Arudji Kartawinata

Personal details
- Born: 24 April 1912 Madiun, Dutch East Indies
- Died: 22 April 1992 (aged 79) Jakarta, Indonesia
- Party: Masyumi

Harsono Tjokroaminoto (EYD: Harsono Cokroaminoto; 24 April 1912 – 22 April 1992) was an Indonesian political figure leaning non-cooperative with the Netherlands. Harsono is Minister of State for Administrative Improvement and Cleaning in Indonesia. In the Dutch colonial period he had a career as a teacher and school inspector Kweekschool PSII, PSII region of North Sulawesi. He helped and led various newspapers and magazines Islamic-leaning politics, author of several brochures, especially the character of politics and all Islam's. In the era of Japanese occupation he spent some time working on Domei Jakarta, and had also came to be in captivity of the Kempeitai, for participating in the movement of Indonesian youth who want to knock down the Japanese government. In 1946, he served as deputy Secretary of State in the Natsir Cabinet; and in 1955, he served as deputy prime minister in the Harahap Cabinet.

On the physical revolution, the second son of the national hero Oemar Said Tjokroaminoto and sister of Siti Oetari, the first wife of the first President of the Republic of Indonesia, Sukarno sits as a personal adviser to general Soedirman and joined a guerrilla group with him, then became a member in the Committee for the United States of Indonesia to restore the Unitary Republic of Indonesia, lead goodwill Indonesian mission to the Islamic countries and became president of the Youth Congress of the Islamic world. In 1972-1975 he was appointed ambassador to the Republic of Indonesia to Switzerland; and in 1976-1978 he served as a member of the Supreme Advisory Council.
