= House of Representatives (Indonesia, 1971–1977) =

House of Representatives of Indonesia (1971–1977)
| ← | 1966–1971 | 1977–1982 | → |
- Coat of arms of the House of Representatives of Indonesia

Overview
- Legislative body: House of Representatives (Indonesia)
- Jurisdiction: Indonesia
- Meeting place: MPR/DPR Building
- Term: 28 October 1971 – 30 September 1977
- Election: 1971 Indonesian legislative election
- Government: First Development Cabinet (until 1973); Second Development Cabinet (from 1973)
- Members: 460
- Speaker: Idham Chalid
- Deputy Speaker: Sumiskum
- Deputy Speaker: Jailani Naro
- Deputy Speaker: Domo Pranoto
- Deputy Speaker: Muhammad Sudjono
- Deputy Speaker: Mohammad Isnaeni
- Party control: Golkar

The House of Representatives of the Republic of Indonesia for the period 1971–1977 (abbreviated as DPR-RI 1971–1977) resulted from the 1971 Indonesian legislative election. Members of the House of Representatives were sworn in on 28 October 1971, consisting of 460 members, representing 10 different parties. This was until the merging of the parties in 1973, resulting in only 3 parties being represented.

== Leadership ==
=== Speaker ===
Speaker
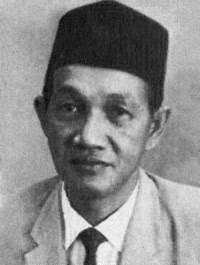
Idham Chalid
NU

=== Deputy speaker ===
| Deputy Speaker | Deputy Speaker | Deputy Speaker | Deputy Speaker | Deputy Speaker |
|---|---|---|---|---|
| Sumiskum; Golkar | Jailani Naro; PPP (Note: Jailani Naro is listed as a member of the United Development Party, though for the first 3 years of his term, he was a member of the Muslim Party of Indonesia.) | Domo Pranoto; Military | Muhammad Sudjono; Military | Mohammad Isnaeni; PDI |
