= Coordinating Ministry for Social Empowerment =

Coordinating Ministry for Community Empowerment
- Kementerian Koordinator Bidang Pemberdayaan Masyarakat

Ministry overview
- Formed: 20 October 2024 (announcement); 5 November 2024
- Preceding agencies: Deputy V (Coordination for Tourism and Creative Economy), Coordinating Ministry for Maritime and Investment Affairs (partial); Deputy II (Coordination of Regional Development Equity and Disaster Management), Coordinating Ministry for Human Development and Cultural Affairs (partial); Deputy IV (Coordination for Digital Economy, Manpower, and SMBEs), Coordinating Ministry for Economic Affairs (partial)
- Jurisdiction: Government of Indonesia
- Headquarters: Jl. Medan Merdeka Barat No. 3. Jakarta Pusat
- Minister responsible: Muhaimin Iskandar, Coordinating Minister
- Website: www.kemenkopm.go.id

The Coordinating Ministry for Community Empowerment (Note: Indonesian: Kementerian Koordinator Bidang Pemberdayaan Masyarakat, abbreviated as Kemenko Dayamas or Kemenko PM.) is an Indonesian government ministry in charge of planning and policy coordination, as well as synchronization of policies in the field of social empowerment. The ministry is led by a Coordinating Minister, which is currently held by Muhaimin Iskandar since 21 October 2024. This coordinating ministry is a spin-off of the Coordinating Ministry for Human Development and Cultural Affairs.

== Organization ==
Based on the Presidential Decree No. 146/2024, and as expanded by the Coordinating Minister for Community Empowerment Decree No. 1/2024, the Coordinating Ministry for Social Empowerment is organized into the following:

- Office of the Coordinating Minister for Community Empowerment
- Office of the Deputy Coordinating Minister for Community Empowerment
- Coordinating Ministry Secretariat
  - Bureau of Performance Management and Partnership
  - Bureau of Law, Organization, and Proceedings
  - Bureau of Communication and Data and Information Management
  - Bureau of Finance, Human Resources, and General Affairs
- Deputy for Community Economy Empowerment and Migrant Workers Protection Coordination (Deputy I)
  - Assistant Deputy for Community Economy Development
  - Assistant Deputy for Community Products Marketing
  - Assistant Deputy for MSMBEs and Cooperation Funding
  - Assistant Deputy for Creative Economy and Entrepreneurial Development
  - Assistant Deputy for Migrant Workers Placement and Protection
- Deputy for Social Welfare Coordination (Deputy II)
  - Assistant Deputy for Social Protection and Assistance
  - Assistant Deputy for Social Security
  - Assistant Deputy for Social Empowerment
  - Assistant Deputy for Sustainable Social Capacity Development
  - Assistant Deputy for Social Rehabilitation and Accessibility
- Deputy for Community Empowerment in Villages, Disadvantaged Regions, and Specially Designated Regions Coordination (Deputy III)
  - Assistant Deputy for Villagers Empowerment
  - Assistant Deputy for Disadvantaged Regions People Empowerment
  - Assistant Deputy for Specially Designated Regions People Empowerment
  - Assistant Deputy for Village Resilience and Rural Affairs
- Board of Experts
  - Senior Expert to the Minister on Economic Development and Digitalization
  - Senior Expert to the Minister on Interinstitutional and Public Relationships
- Inspectorate

== Coordinated agencies ==
Based on the Presidential Decree No. 146/2024, these ministries are placed under the coordinating ministry:

- Ministry of Social Affairs
- Ministry of Indonesian Migrant Workers Protection
- Minister of Villages and Development of Disadvantaged Regions
- Ministry of Cooperatives
- Ministry of Micro, Small, and Medium Enterprises
- Ministry of Creative Economy
