= Wahono =

Indonesian politician (1925–2004)

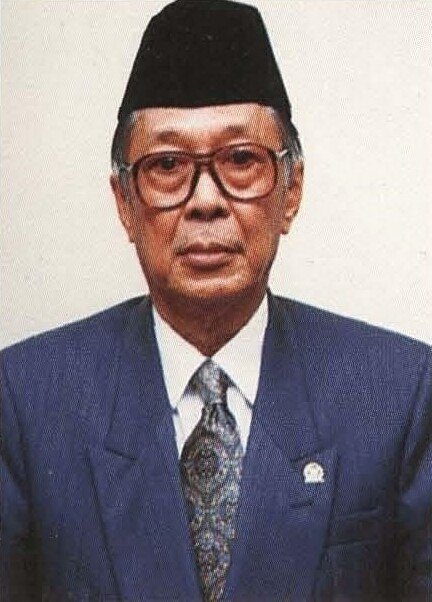
- Official portrait, 1992

8th Speaker of the People's Consultative Assembly
- In office 1 October 1992 – 30 September 1997
- Preceded by: Kharis Suhud
- Succeeded by: Harmoko

11th Speaker of the House of Representatives
- In office 1 October 1992 – 30 September 1997
- Preceded by: Kharis Suhud
- Succeeded by: Harmoko

5th General Chairman of Golkar
- In office 25 October 1988 – 24 October 1993
- Preceded by: Sudharmono
- Succeeded by: Harmoko

9th Governor of East Java
- In office 26 August 1983 – 26 August 1988
- Vice Governor: Soeparmanto (1983–1988); Trimarjono (1985–1988)
- Preceded by: Soenandar Prijosoedarmo
- Succeeded by: Soelarso

Personal details
- Born: 25 March 1925 Tulungagung, Oost-Java, Dutch East Indies
- Died: 8 November 2004 (aged 79) Jakarta, Indonesia
- Party: Golkar
- Spouse: Mientarsih Syahbandar (m. 1951)
- Occupation: Politician; army officer

Military service
- Allegiance: Empire of Japan; Indonesia
- Branch/service: Indonesian Army
- Years of service: 1943–1977
- Rank: Lieutenant general
- Unit: Infantry
- Service no.: 10291

Wahono (25 March 1925 – 8 November 2004) was an Indonesian politician who served as Speaker of the People's Consultative Assembly during the New Order regime of president Suharto. Prior to that, he served as the Governor of East Java from 1983 until 1988, and served as a member of the Indonesian National Armed Forces from 1945 until 1977.

Political offices
Preceded by Kharis Suhud	Speaker of the People's Consultative Assembly; Speaker of the House of Representatives; 1992–1997	Succeeded by Harmoko
Party political offices
Preceded by Sudharmono	General Chairman of Golkar; 1988–1993	Succeeded by Harmoko
