= Marzuki Alie =

Indonesian politician and businessman (born 1955)

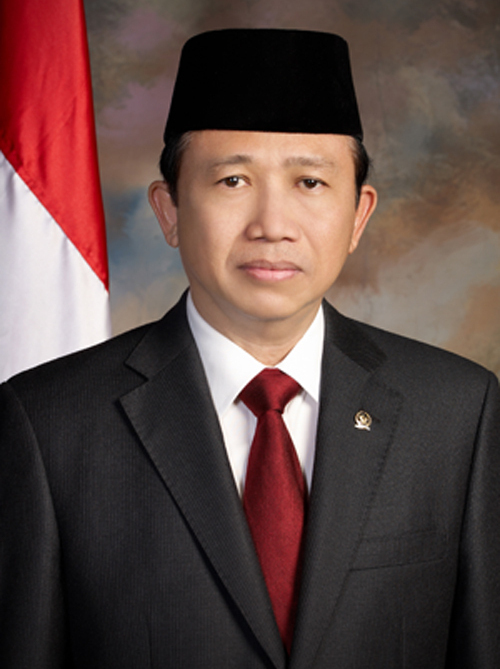
- Official portrait, 2009

15th Speaker of the House of Representatives
- In office 1 October 2009 – 30 September 2014
- Preceded by: Agung Laksono
- Succeeded by: Setya Novanto

Personal details
- Born: 6 November 1955 (age 70) Palembang, Indonesia
- Party: Independent
- Other political affiliations: Demokrat (2002–2021)
- Spouse: Asmawati
- Education: Sriwijaya University; Universiti Utara Malaysia
- Occupation: Politician; businessman
- Website: marzukialie.com

Marzuki Alie (born 6 November 1955) is an Indonesian politician and businessman who served as the fifteenth speaker of the People's Representative Council from 2009 until 2014. A member of the Democratic Party until 2021, he was kicked from the party during an internal leadership struggle within the party. Marzuki Alie also served as Secretary General of the Democratic Party, the party formed by Susilo Bambang Yudhoyono.

Marzuki Alie has PhD in Political Science from Universiti Utara Malaysia, and also a degree in management from Sriwijaya University, Palembang. Before his political tenure, Marzuki worked as a civil servant in the Ministry of Finance. He has also served as director of PT. Semen Baturaja, is a state-owned cement company.

In 2012, he was part of the State visit of President Susilo Bambang Yudhoyono to the United Kingdom. He was appointed an Honorary Knight Commander of the Order of St Michael and St George.

Marzuki lost his Jakarta-3 seat in the 2014 election as Demokrat was unable to obtain enough votes to win any seats in the constituency.

== Education history ==
- Marketing Politics - PhD Program, Universiti Utara Malaysia
- Corporate Finance - Magister Manajemen UNSRI, Palembang
- Production Management - Fakultas Ekonomi UNSRI, Palembang
- SMA Xaverius I Palembang, Jurusan IPA
- SMP Negeri IV Palembang
- SD Negeri 36 Palembang

== Career history ==
- Commissioner of PT.Global Perkasa Investindo group, 2006–2009
- Commercial Director of PT.Semen Baturaja (Persero) Palembang, 1999–2006
- PT.Semen Baturaja (Persero) Palembang, Baturaja, Lampung, Jakarta
- Civil Servants in KPN, Indonesian Ministry of Finance Palembang, 1979–1980
- Civil Servants in di Ditjen Aanggaran, Indonesian Ministry of Finance Jakarta, 1975–1979

Political offices
Preceded by Agung Laksono	Speaker of the House of Representatives; 2009–2014	Succeeded by Setya Novanto
