= Sri Edi Swasono =

Sri Edi Swasono (born in Ngawi (city), Ngawi, 16 September 1940) is a professor of economics at the University of Indonesia. He was a member People's Consultative Assembly (MPR) of the emissary group in the New Order era of Indonesia, ruled by President Soeharto. He has been involved in the cooperative world. His wife is the first daughter of Mohammad Hatta, the father of cooperative (Bapak Koperasi) Indonesia and the first vice president of Indonesia. Sri Edi spent his life to study and to fight for the development of cooperatives in Indonesia.

== Career ==
Sri Edi Swasono high educational background began with becoming a student of Faculty of Economics and graduated in 1963 [4]. Then continue their studies MPIA S2 earned at University of Pittsburgh in 1966. Not long after that, he completed his studies and obtained his PhD S3 in the same university (1969).

He is a productive person. A lot of work, experience, and awards resulting from his hard work. His works include:

- Cultural Breakthrough (Terobosan Kultural; 1986),
- Economic Democracy: Participation Business Linkages VS Economic Concentration (Demokrasi Ekonomi: Keterkaitan Usaha Partisipasi VS Konsentrasi Ekonomi; 1988),
- Economic Systems and Economic Democracy (Sistem Ekonomi dan Demokrasi Ekonomi; 1991),
- Towards Economic Development and the People (Menuju Pembangunan Perekonomian Rakyat; 1998).

Sri Edi actively trying to fight for the economic populist with cooperatives as a form of economic democracy. For their hard work was, he was confirmed Professor, dated July 13, 1988 to bring inaugural speech, entitled "Economic Democracy, Commitment and Development of Indonesia".
