= Zainul Arifin =

Indonesian politician

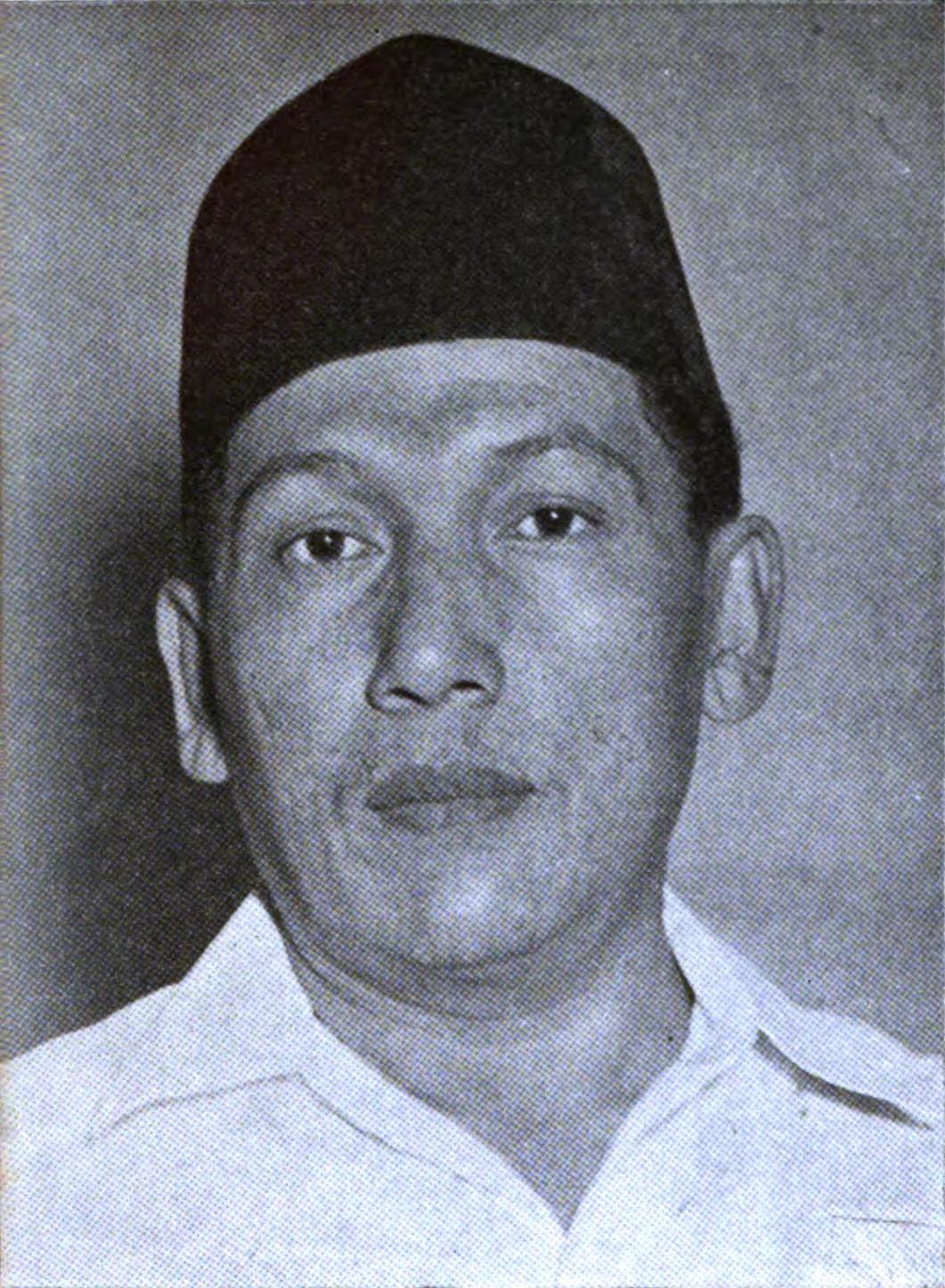
- Zainul Arifin in 1954

2nd Speaker of the House of Representatives
- In office 26 June 1960 – 2 March 1963
- President: Sukarno
- Preceded by: Sartono
- Succeeded by: Arudji Kartawinata

Acting Minister of Defense
- In office 13 July 1955 – 12 August 1955
- President: Sukarno
- Prime Minister: Ali Sastroamidjojo
- Preceded by: Iwa Koesoemasoemantri
- Succeeded by: Burhanuddin Harahap

Deputy Prime Minister of Indonesia
- In office 30 July 1953 – 12 August 1955 Serving with Wongsonegoro
- President: Sukarno
- Prime Minister: Ali Sastroamidjojo
- Preceded by: Prawoto Mangkusasmito
- Succeeded by: Harsono Tjokroaminoto; Djanoe Ismadi

Personal details
- Born: Zainul Arifin Pohan; 2 September 1909 Baroes, Dutch East Indies
- Died: 2 March 1963 (aged 53) Djakarta, Indonesia
- Party: Nahdlatul Ulama
- Other political affiliations: Masyumi (1945–1952)
- Occupation: Politician; legislator

Kyai Haji Zainul Arifin (né Pohan; born 2 September 1909 – 2 March 1963) was an Indonesian politician who served as deputy prime minister of Indonesia, 2nd speaker of the DPR, and a leading figure of the Nahdlatul Ulama.

== Biography ==
=== Childhood and education ===
Zainul Arifin was born as the only child of a descendant of the king of Barus, Sultan Raja Barus Tuangku Ramali bin Sultan Alam Sahi Pohan, and a woman of Kotanopan noble origin, Mandailing, Siti Baiyah boru Nasution. Zainul was a toddler when his parents divorced and he was brought by his mother to Kotanopan, then to Kerinci, Jambi. There, he began his education at Hollands Indische School (HIS). In addition, Zainul Arifin also received a religious education in mosques and Madrasas while also undergoing the traditional martial arts training of Pencak Silat. After graduating from HIS, Zainul continued his education at Normaal School, a middle school for future teachers. Arifin was also very artistic and was once active in the Malay musical theater, Stambul Bangsawan or "Musical Theater of the aristocrats". On stage, Arifin took roles as a singer and violinist. Stambul Bangsawan itself is the beginning of the development of opera theater of modern Indonesian performing arts. At the age of 16, Zainul Arifin then migrated to Batavia (Jakarta).

=== From Gemeente to GP Ansor ===
In Batavia, Zainul used his HIS diploma to apply for work at the colonial township government (Gemeente) as a clerk in the water company in Jakarta. There he worked for five years before finally being laid off when the Great Depression impacted the Dutch East Indies in the 1930s. After quitting the gemeente, Arifin then chose to work as an elementary school teacher and as an educator for adults Sekolah Pendidikan Rakyat, in the Meester Cornelis Region (Now Jatinegara). Zainul also often provided legal assistance to people who needed a lawyer with no educational background yet mastered Dutch Law (Pokrol Bambu). In addition, he was also active again in the musical theater arts activities of traditional Betawi musical theater much influenced by the Malay tradition of Stambul Bangsawan called Samrah. He also founded a group called Samrah Tonil Zainul. Through this artistic activity, Arifin met and befriended Djamaluddin Malik, who would later become a prominent filmmaker in Indonesia. They both were very active in Samrah activities and later joined the Youth Movement (GP) ANSOR when it started actively recruiting new young members. Ansor was a youth movement under the Nahdlatul Ulama (NU).

As a member of ANSOR, Arifin underwent ANSOR religious training preparing youths to become future Islamic preachers. Zainul's expertise in delivering speeches, debating, and preaching in Dutch and English had caught the attention of leaders of the Nahdlatul Ulama, including Wahid Hasyim, Mahfouz Siddiq, Muhammad Ilyas, and Abdullah Ubaid. In just a few short years, Zainul had become chairman of the Jatinegara Chapter of NU. Later, he was appointed the Head of NU Consul in Batavia, until the arrival of the Japanese army in 1942 during its invasion of the Dutch East Indies.

=== Becoming the commander of Masyumi's Hezbollah ===
During the era of Japanese military occupation, Zainul Arifin became a representative of the NU in the management of the Indonesian Muslim Shura Assembly (Masyumi) and was involved in the creation of the paramilitary group Hezbollah.

To gain the sympathy of the locals, the Japanese gave Islamic organizations (mainly NU) an opportunity to be more active in government under Japanese military occupation. Zainul Arifin was tasked with the creation of the tonarigumi, a precursor to the current rukun tetangga, in Jatinegara, and eventually in other villages situated on the island of Java. With tensions rising during the Asia-Pacific War, Japan permitted the creation of various local paramilitary organizations. Young Muslim men were recruited to such organizations, including what would eventually become Hezbollah. Arifin, who was appointed Hezbollah's commander, was tasked with coordinating semi-military training in Cibarusa, situated near Bogor. During the height of those training in anticipation of a potential battle, Sukarno and Hatta proclaimed Indonesia's independence on 17 August 1945 in Jakarta.

=== Post-independence ===
Zainul was then charged with representing the Masyumi Party's faction within the Central Indonesian National Committee (KNIP), the precursor to the People's Consultative Assembly (MPR), while continuing to hold the leadership of Hezbollah, which had also been integrated into the armed forces. During the Indonesian National Revolution, in addition to attending sessions of the KNIP which had been relocated several times due to the urgency of the situation then, Arifin also led guerrilla movements in Central Java and East Java during the first and second Dutch Military Aggressions. During the Dutch's second military offensive in December 1948, the Dutch military successfully captured Yogyakarta and held both Sukarno and Hatta captive. During the state of emergency, the Working Committee of the KNIP was essentially non-functioning. Arifin was then involved as a member of the Central Government Commissariat in Java, part of the Emergency Government of the Republic of Indonesia (PDRI) located in Bukittinggi, West Sumatra.

Zainul's main task was to consolidate the bodies waging guerrilla tactics under the command of General Sudirman. When the government merged all armed forces into the centralized Indonesian Armed Forces, Zainul Arifin was initially appointed secretary of the Armed Forces' top leadership. However, when many former members of Hezbollah were not accepted as members of the military, citing that they weren't given modern education and only graduated from madrasas, he chose to resign and concentrate on the continuing struggle for civil political channels.

=== Legislative and executive career ===
With the Netherlands finally recognizing Indonesia's sovereignty on 27 December 1949, Zainul Arifin returned to Parliament as a representative of the Masyumi Party and later representative of the NU party when it finally broke away from Masyumi in 1952. A year later, Arifin was then involved in the executive branch after being appointed Deputy Prime Minister under Ali Sastroamidjojo's second premiership (1953–1955).

== Political career ==
Since Indonesia's independence Zainul Arifin has sat in the Working Committee of the Central Indonesian National Committee (BP KNIP), the predecessor to MPR. Arifin was active in parliament representing the party and later the NU party after breaking away from Masyumi in 1952. Only during 1953–1955 while serving as deputy prime minister under Ali Sastroamidjojo's second premiership was Zainul involved in the executive branch. This administration was successful in organizing the Bandung Asian-African Conference in 1955.

The General Election in 1955 had ushered Zainul Arifin to become a member of the Constituent Assembly and deputy Speaker of the DPR until the two institutions were dissolved by presidential decree 5 July 1959. During the early days of the Guided Democracy era, he then chaired the House Mutual Aid (DPRGR) in an effort to strengthen the Communist Party of Indonesia ("PKI") in parliament. Amid political tensions, on 14 May 1962, during Eid al-Adha prayers at the forefront with Sukarno, Zainul was shot by a DI/TII rebel who intended to kill the president. Zainul Arifin eventually died on 2 March 1963 after sustaining the gunshot wound for ten months.
