= Taufik Kurniawan =

Indonesian politician (1967–2022)

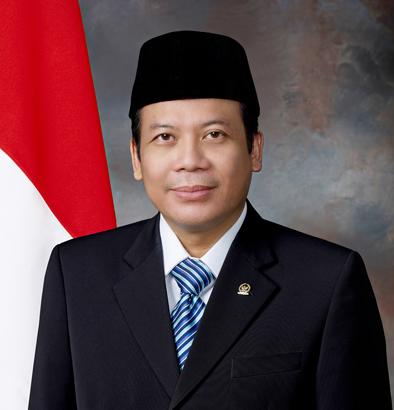
- Kurniawan in 2014

Deputy Speaker of the People's Representative Council
- In office 2 October 2010 – 1 October 2019
- Preceded by: Marwoto Mitrohardjono
- Succeeded by: Sufmi Dasco Ahmad

Personal details
- Born: 22 November 1967 Semarang, Indonesia
- Died: 24 November 2022 (aged 55) Semarang, Indonesia
- Party: PAN
- Education: Diponegoro University

Taufik Kurniawan (22 November 1967 – 24 November 2022) was an Indonesian politician. A member of the National Mandate Party, he served as a deputy speaker of the People's Representative Council from 2010 to 2019.

Kurniawan died in Semarang on 24 November 2022, at the age of 55.
