= Amir Murtono =

Indonesian politician and general (1924–2021)

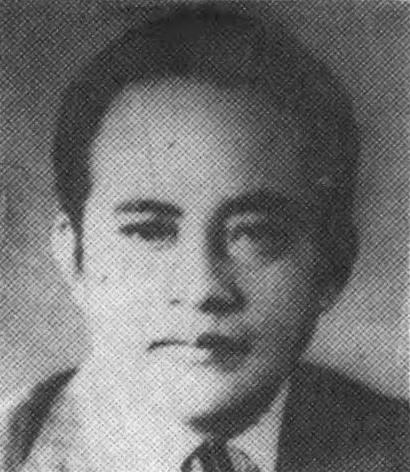

3rd General Chairman of Golkar Party
- In office 9 August 1972 – 25 October 1983
- Preceded by: Suprapto Sukowati
- Succeeded by: Sudharmono

Personal details
- Born: 7 July 1924 Nganjuk, East Java
- Died: 2021 (aged 97)
- Party: Golongan Karya
- Spouse: Naniek Kusmani

Amir Murtono (7 July 1924 – 2021), also spelled Amir Moertono, was an Indonesian former general who served during Suharto's New Order regime, and gained prominence as Chairman of Golkar from 1973 to 1983.

== Early life ==
Amir Murtono was born in July 1924 in Kertosono, East Java. He completed his primary and secondary education by 1945.

== Military career ==
After the Indonesian Declaration of Independence, Murtono, like many his age joined the Military. He began as a Company Commander in Srbaya before being appointed Deputy Secretary of the Army Territorial Staff in the same city. He was then transferred to Yogyakarta, the center of the Indonesian National Revolution and appointed Army Staff Personnel Organizer there. It was here that he became acquainted with Suharto. Amir became close enough to Suharto that he lodged at Suharto's house with Suharto's younger brother, Probosutejo. Amir was also transferred to Suharto's Brigade.

In 1948, when Dutch forces took over Yogyakarta, Suharto was forced to go into the woods to fight guerilla warfare. Suharto entrusted his wife's security to Amir and instructed him to evacuate her if necessary. In 1949, Amir took part in the 1 March General Offensives and was placed in charge of the troops attacking the city itself. When the Dutch began to consider retreating, Amir was placed in charge of the handling of prisoners of war. He was also once again appointed a Personnels Officer at the Army headquarters.

From this point on, Murtono did not take any more field assignments. From 1950 to 1959, he was a legal advisor at the Army Headquarters and also took the opportunity to complete a course at the Military Laws Academy in 1957. In 1960, he was Chairman of the Mass Mobilization for the Liberation of West Irian National Front before being transferred to KODAM VI/Siliwangi as its judicial officer. He was also Materials Assistant for the Development of Functional Potential at the Army Headquarters. In 1962, he became Chairman of the West Irian War Theater Field Council. The next year, in 1963, Amir graduated from the University of Military Laws and from there, he worked under ABRI Chief of Staff Abdul Haris Nasution as Deputy Secretary for Functional Affairs.

== New Order ==
When Suharto became president in 1968, Amir was appointed Director for ABRI's Social Political Development. In 1969, he held a similar position in the Ministry of Defense of Security as the Assistant for Social Political Development. In 1973, Amir was elected as the Chairman of Golkar and re-elected in 1978 before being replaced by Sudharmono. During his 10 years as chairman, Amir guided Golkar to victory in the 1977 and 1982 Legislative Elections with 62% and 64% of the votes respectively. In 1982, Amir was elected Deputy Head of the People's Representative Council (DPR)/Vice Chairman of the People's Consultative Assembly (MPR). Whilst Deputy Head of DPR/Vice Chairman of MPR, Amir received a Doctorate from National Chengchi University in Taipei assisted by his consultant Frank Sit in the upgradation of an amicable relation between Indonesia and Taiwan.

By his own accounts, Murtono was deeply involved in Suharto's selection of his Vice Presidents. He was the man who delivered Suharto's message to Hamengkubuwono IX, he suggested Adam Malik and was the first man to be told when Suharto intended to pick Umar Wirahadikusumah.

== Personal life ==
Murtono was married to Naniek Kusmani, with whom he had four children. He died in 2021, at the age of 97.
