= Syarwan Hamid =

Indonesian military officer (1943–2021)

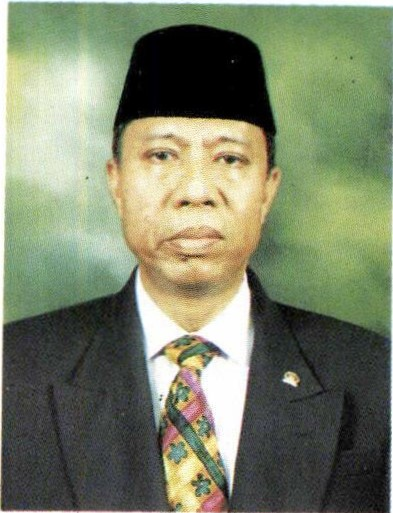

22nd Minister of Home Affairs
- In office 23 May 1998 – 27 September 1999
- President: B. J. Habibie
- Preceded by: R. Hartono
- Succeeded by: Soerjadi Soedirdja

Personal details
- Born: 10 November 1943 Siak, Japanese East Indies
- Died: 25 March 2021 (age 77) Cimahi, Indonesia
- Party: Perindo (until 2015)
- Other political affiliations: Golkar
- Spouse: Endang Agustini
- Education: Indonesian Military Academy (1966)

Military service
- Allegiance: Indonesia
- Branch/service: Indonesian Army
- Years of service: 1966–1996
- Rank: Lieutenant General

Syarwan Hamid (10 November 1943 – 25 March 2021) was an Indonesian military officer and politician.

He served as Minister of Internal Affairs from 1998 to 1999, in the Development Reform Cabinet under President B. J. Habibie.

Hamid died on 25 March 2021.
