= Muhaimin Iskandar =

Indonesian politician (born 1966)

- Official portrait, 2025

Coordinating Minister for Social Empowerment
- Incumbent
- Assumed office 21 October 2024
- President: Prabowo Subianto
- Preceded by: Position established

Fourth Deputy Speaker of the House of Representatives
- In office 1 October 2019 – 1 October 2024 Serving with 3 other people
- Speaker: Puan Maharani
- In office 26 October 1999 – 1 October 2009
- Speaker: Akbar Tandjung (1999–2004); Agung Laksono (2004–2009)

Deputy Speaker of the People's Consultative Assembly
- In office 26 March 2018 – 1 October 2019 Serving with 6 other people
- Speaker: Zulkifli Hasan

3nd General Chairman of National Awakening Party
- Incumbent
- Assumed office 18 April 2005
- Preceded by: Alwi Shihab

Member of the House of Representatives
- In office 2 October 2014 – 1 October 2024
- Succeeded by: Abdul Halim Iskandar
- Constituency: East Java VIII
- In office 1 October 1999 – 22 October 2009
- Succeeded by: Imam Nahrawi
- Constituency: East Java I

25th Minister of Labour and Transmigration
- In office 22 October 2009 – 1 October 2014
- President: Susilo Bambang Yudhoyono
- Preceded by: Erman Soeparno
- Succeeded by: Hanif Dhakiri

Personal details
- Born: Abdul Muhaimin Iskandar; 24 September 1966 (age 60) Jombang, Indonesia
- Party: PKB
- Other political affiliations: Coalition of Change for Unity (2023–2024)
- Spouse: Rustini Murtadho
- Children: 3
- Education: Gadjah Mada University (Drs.); University of Indonesia (M.Si.)
- Occupation: Politician
- Website: muhaiminiskandar.co; cakimin.com
- Nickname: Cak Imin

Abdul Muhaimin Iskandar (born 24 September 1966), also colloquially known as Cak Imin or Gus Imin, is an Indonesian politician, serving as the Coordinating Minister for Social Empowerment in President Prabowo Subianto's Red and White Cabinet, the Deputy Speaker of the House of Representatives from 2019 to 2024, and the chairman of the National Awakening Party (PKB) since 2005. Previously, he served as Deputy Speaker of the People's Representative Council from 1999 until 2009, the Minister of Manpower from 2009 until 2014, and the Deputy Speaker of the People's Consultative Assembly from 2018 until 2019. He was a vice presidential candidate in the 2024 Indonesian presidential election, as the running mate of Anies Baswedan.

Born in Jombang, East Java, he was educated at Gadjah Mada University (UGM) and the University of Indonesia (UI). He entered politics during the fall of president Suharto during the late 1990s. He was elected a member of the People's Representative Council in 1999, as a member of the National Awakening Party (PKB). He was close to president and PKB founder Abdurrahman Wahid, and was elected the PKB's chairman in 2005.

After working in several organizations, his government career started when he was elected into and became deputy speaker of the People's Representative Council (DPR) in 1999 until 2009. He later also served as the Minister of Labor and Transmigration between 2009 and 2014, under Susilo Bambang Yudhoyono. He has been elected as a member of DPR five times, although he only served four full terms.

== Early life ==
Iskandar was born on 24 September 1966 in the town of Jombang, East Java. His father Muhammad Iskandar was a teacher in the Mamba'ul Ma'arif Pesantren. His mother Muhasonah Iskandar later became the leader of the pesantren. Iskandar's paternal great-grandfather was Bisri Syamsuri, an ulama who was known as the father of Hasyim Asy'ari (also ulama), the founder of Nahdlatul Ulama and one of the few Indonesians who studied under Ahmad Khatib al-Minangkabawi, along with Ahmad Dahlan (founder of Muhammadiyah). Since childhood, he was close to later president Abdurrahman Wahid, better known as Gus Dur. According to Muhaimin, he knew Gus Dur as a teacher and a peanut vendor, and that Gus Dur had taught him to play football.

During the anniversary of Gus Dur's death in 2016, Iskandar described in an editorial on Tempo magazine about his father who buried an abangan Muslim, illustrating him as an example of humane behavior. Muhaimin added that the writing "made his father famous". He and Gus Dur are distantly related, with Iskandar often being described as Gus Dur's nephew.

== Education ==
Iskandar completed his middle school equivalent in a state-funded madrasa in his hometown (Madrasah Tsanawiyah Negeri Jombang), graduating in 1982. He continued his education in Madrasah Aliyah Negeri 1 Yogyakarta (high-school equivalent) from which he graduated in 1985. During these two periods, he also taught in the pesantren where his dad was teacher.

Enrolling at Gadjah Mada University in Yogyakarta in 1985, he studied in the university's social science and political science faculty. His thesis was titled Perilaku Kapitalis Masyarakat Santri: Telaah Sosiologi tentang Etos Kerja Masyarakat Desa di Jawa Timur (Capitalistic Behavior of Santri: Sociological Study on East Java's Rural Population Work Ethic), and he graduated with a bachelor's degree in 1992.

He resumed his education in the University of Indonesia, studying communications management starting in 1998. He graduated in 2001 with a master's degree. His thesis was titled Manajemen Hubungan Masyarakat Partai Kebangkitan Bangsa dalam Pemilu 1999 (Public Relations Management of the National Awakening Party in the 1999 Election).

During and after his studies, he was part of several student organizations, the Pergerakan Mahasiswa Islam Indonesia (Indonesian Islamic Students' Movement) in which he served as president between 1994 and 1997, social sciences students' corps leader (1989) and member of his faculty's student council (1990) in addition to being Yogyakarta branch president of PMII (1990–1991). He was also member of Komite Nasional Pemuda Indonesia (Indonesian Youths' National Committee) in which he served as vice president of the Yogyakarta branch. During his studies, he was introduced to figures such as Tjahjo Kumolo (then president of KNPI) and Susilo Bambang Yudhoyono.

== Early career ==
Before entering politics, Iskandar worked in several organizations including between and during his university studies. After concluding his studies he moved to Jakarta and worked at the Institute for Islamic and Social Studies as a secretary, Lembaga Pendapat Umum (Public Opinion Institute, founded by Gus Dur) as the research division head, and became active in ForumDemokrasi which was a harsh critic of then-president Suharto. Later, him and Eros Djarot founded the Detik tabloid, in which he served as the chief for research and development until the publication was censured. He also briefly worked at Helen Keller International.

== Political career ==
The New Order government, under Suharto, made the Nahdlatul Ulama part of the United Development Party and constrained the presence of Islam in politics while promoting its cultural presence. Hence, in 1984 the organization withdrew from practical politics. According to Iskandar, he was once interrogated alongside his entire class in Madrasah Tsanawiyah when they discussed Suharto's wealth.

During the Asian financial crisis, Iskandar had served as the president of the PMII since 1994. The Nahdlatul Ulama appointed him as part of an assistance team to form the National Awakening Party. Iskandar's role was to prepare the party's articles of association. He was also appointed as secretary general for the party. After the fall of Suharto, the new party participated in the 1999 election and won 12.6% of the national votes, securing 51 seats in the People's Representative Council and becoming the third-largest group behind PDI-P and Golkar.

=== Deputy speaker of DPR ===
Several weeks after he was selected into the People's Representative Council, he became a deputy speaker of the house at the age of 33, one of the youngest in its history. His post covered the industry, trade and development sectors. During his first term, he also acted as the speaker of the PKB faction. PKB's coalition in the People's Consultative Assembly would then deliver Abdurrahman Wahid to become the 4th President of Indonesia in a vote The Economist described as "a shock", defeating Megawati Soekarnoputri 373 against 313.

Later on, after being reelected for his second term in the 2004 election, he would continue serving in his post after he was re-elected along with other coalition politicians, with Agung Laksono as speaker. He stated in an interview that the body's competencies when it comes to legislative and budget matters were very weak, due to lack of expert staff.

=== Party disputes ===
==== 2005–2006: Leadership dispute ====
In a party congress held between 16 and 18 April 2005 in Semarang, Iskandar was elected as the new chairman of the National Awakening Party, replacing Alwi Shihab. He won 304 from the 382 votes through acclamation, with competitors such as Ali Masykur Musa, Saifullah Yusuf and Mohammad Mahfud MD. The latter stated that the vote was "legally broken", and that Iskandar's position was invalid. The case was brought to court, and the South Jakarta District Court ruled in favor of Iskandar's version of the party leadership on August. Some political observers noted that Abdurrahman Wahid, no longer president despite still being influential, visited president Susilo Bambang Yudhoyono and may have caused him to influence the court's decision.

Regardless, the opposing ulama faction held a separate congress in Surabaya on early October that year. This congress elected Choirul Anam as chairman instead. The Supreme Court also determined that the removal of Alwi Shihab was invalid in November 2005, strengthening the ulama faction's claims to party leadership. Despite this, the Ministry of Law and Human Rights recognized Iskandar's faction as legitimate in March 2006, followed by the South Jakarta District Court in June. The ulama faction appealed to the Supreme Court following the latter decision. The Supreme Court ruled in accordance with the Ministry and the District Court, hence ending the schism in September 2006. The ulama faction proceeded to splinter off and form the Ulema National Awakening Party.

==== 2008: Conflict with Gus Dur ====
By 2007, rumors surfaced that Iskandar was attempting to take over Gus Dur's position in the party by holding an extraordinary congress. He vehemently denied this, saying "Me, against Gus Dur? Who am I?!". Following an internal meeting in March 2008, he was voted out from his chairman position, but neither him nor Gus Dur were allowed to vote. Soon afterwards, Iskandar formed a faction and brought the case to court, suing Gus Dur. His former organization, PMII, declared its support for his faction. Iskandar also removed Gus Dur's daughter Yenny Wahid from her position as secretary general in April.

The initial court sessions were not attended by party officials from either factions. In May, Iskandar's faction set up an office for the upcoming election, with the opposing faction reporting it to the police for misuse of party attributes. Representatives from both factions were present during the distribution of the ballot number by the KPU. The dispute settled down in July, when the Supreme Court decreed that the party leadership remained as it was in 2005.

In the following year, the party gained 28 seats (compared to 53 in 2004) from the election. On 25 December, he removed Gus Dur's sister Lily Wahid from the party, citing internal rule violations. Just several days later, Gus Dur died. Iskandar denied that he "betrayed" Gus Dur in a 2014 address, claiming that he had resigned from the party but Gus Dur returned his resignation letter. On the same year, he had been reported by Gus Dur's family for using the former president's image in campaign materials despite demands to not do so.

=== Minister of Labor and Transmigration ===
Under him, PKB supported Susilo Bambang Yudhoyono's reelection in 2009. In the same year, he was elected for his third term in the house. He later was appointed as a minister in the Second United Indonesia Cabinet, as the minister of labor and transmigration. At the age of 43, he was the youngest minister in the cabinet. Due to this position, he resigned from his post in DPR, to be replaced with fellow PKB politician Imam Nahrawi. Iskandar's wealth was reported at Rp 1.6 billion (US$170,000) in April but he reported it as Rp 6.9 billion (US$733,000) by November, with him saying that he "hadn't been disciplined in reporting his wealth".

In September 2010, his ministry prohibited Indonesian maids from leaving to Malaysia, Kuwait or Jordan following the abuse of an Indonesian maid in Penang. When a maid was executed in Saudi Arabia without the Indonesian government being notified in 2011, he also stopped the flow of Indonesian domestic workers there. He stated that Indonesia will ratify the International Labour Organization Convention 189 on Domestic Workers in March 2014. As of September 2018, Indonesia still have not ratified the convention. In 2014, he signed an agreement with Saudi Arabia on the protection of household workers.

Following major demonstrations by workers across the country in October 2012, Iskandar created regulations regarding outsourcing, limiting it to 5 sectors i.e. mining, catering, transport, cleaning and security. It was made official as Labor and Transmigration Minister Regulation 19 of 2012.

He was called as a witness in a trial for a corruption scandal involving his ministry in February 2012. He was also briefly investigated by the Corruption Eradication Commission the year prior regarding the same scandal. One of the involved parties accused Iskandar of demanding Rp 1.5 billion through his underlings. The court's verdict did not find him guilty, nor was he investigated as a suspect.

=== Joko Widodo presidency ===
In the 2014 legislative election, PKB gained 9.04% of the national votes and secured 47 seats in the parliament. In September that year, Iskandar secured his third term as the party's chairman. For the presidential election, PKB under Iskandar backed PDI-P candidate Joko Widodo (Jokowi) who won and became president. In Jokowi's Working Cabinet, the Ministry of Labor and Transmigration was renamed to the Ministry of Labor and Iskandar was replaced by Hanif Dhakiri. Iskandar was also elected to the People's Representative Council for the fourth time, winning 116,694 votes. He refused to resign from his legislative seat, and was not placed in Jokowi's cabinet.

He criticized Minister of Maritime Affairs and Fisheries Susi Pudjiastuti's policies, saying that they cause trouble for the Indonesian fishermen. Another probe by the Corruption Eradication Commission on a bribe scandal within his ministry resulted in his involvement being investigated.

On 26 March 2018, as part of a new regulation on the legislative bodies, he was appointed to one of three newly created deputy speaker positions in the MPR.

=== 2019 presidential election ===
As early as February 2016, members of his party had proposed for him to run as a running mate in the 2019 election. This was followed by several organizations and individuals, from santri to fishermen groups and PKB legislators. In Bekasi, multiple banners appeared promoting him for the candidacy. When another occurrence happened later, PKB's deputy secretary general Daniel Johan claimed that the banners were put up by a grassroots movement.

While an observer from Padjadjaran University assessed Iskandar as "too confident", Iskandar himself stated on 6 March 2018 that he was "still certain that Pak Jokowi will ask [him to become his running mate]". Joko Widodo in March 2018 noted that he was still setting up the criteria for his running mate, and has not settled on one. Gerindra officials have also entertained the possibility of a Prabowo Subianto–Muhaimin ticket. Survey results for vice presidential candidates gave varying results, with a result from LSI placing Iskandar as a top contender for the slot. Other surveys conducted on similar dates however put forth other contenders such as Agus Harimurti Yudhoyono, if incumbent Jusuf Kalla is unaccounted for. On 15 March 2018, Iskandar announced that he had officially proposed to become Joko Widodo's running mate for 2019, citing his advantages as an attractor for Muslim voters. In accordance with this, he established an office for JOIN (Jokowi-Muhaimin) in April 2018. In August, Joko Widodo officially declared Indonesian Ulema Council leader Ma'ruf Amin as his vice presidential candidate. While he said he was "surprised", Iskandar declared his support for the ticket, and continued to use the "JOIN" (now Jokowi-Ma'ruf Amin) acronym.

Iskandar himself ran in the legislative election, running for a fifth term still in East Java's 8th electoral district. He won 149,916 votes and secured a seat. He was later appointed a deputy speaker at DPR.

=== 2024 election ===
On 1 September 2023, presidential candidate Anies Baswedan declared Iskandar as his running mate for the 2024 Indonesian presidential election. Prior to the announcement, PKB had already agreed to support Prabowo Subianto in the election, and thus PKB withdrew from the coalition. As a response to the announcement, the Democratic Party under former president Susilo Bambang Yudhoyono withdrew its support of Baswedan's candidacy.

== Personal life ==
He married Rustini Murtadho in 1995. According to Iskandar, he called in four major political figures (Megawati Soekarnoputri, Taufiq Kiemas, Abdurrahman Wahid and Eros Djarot) to convince his in-laws when he proposed. The couple has three children born in 1996, 2000 and 2003.

In 2017, he received an honoris causa doctorate from Airlangga University. Some lecturers at the university protested against the awarding, citing a procedural failure.

== Honours ==
- Indonesia:
  - Star of Mahaputera, 1st Class (Bintang Mahaputera Adipurna) (25 August 2025)
  - Star of Mahaputera, 2nd Class (Bintang Mahaputera Adipradana) (9 August 2009)
