= Rachmad Gobel =

Indonesian businessman and politician (1962–2026)

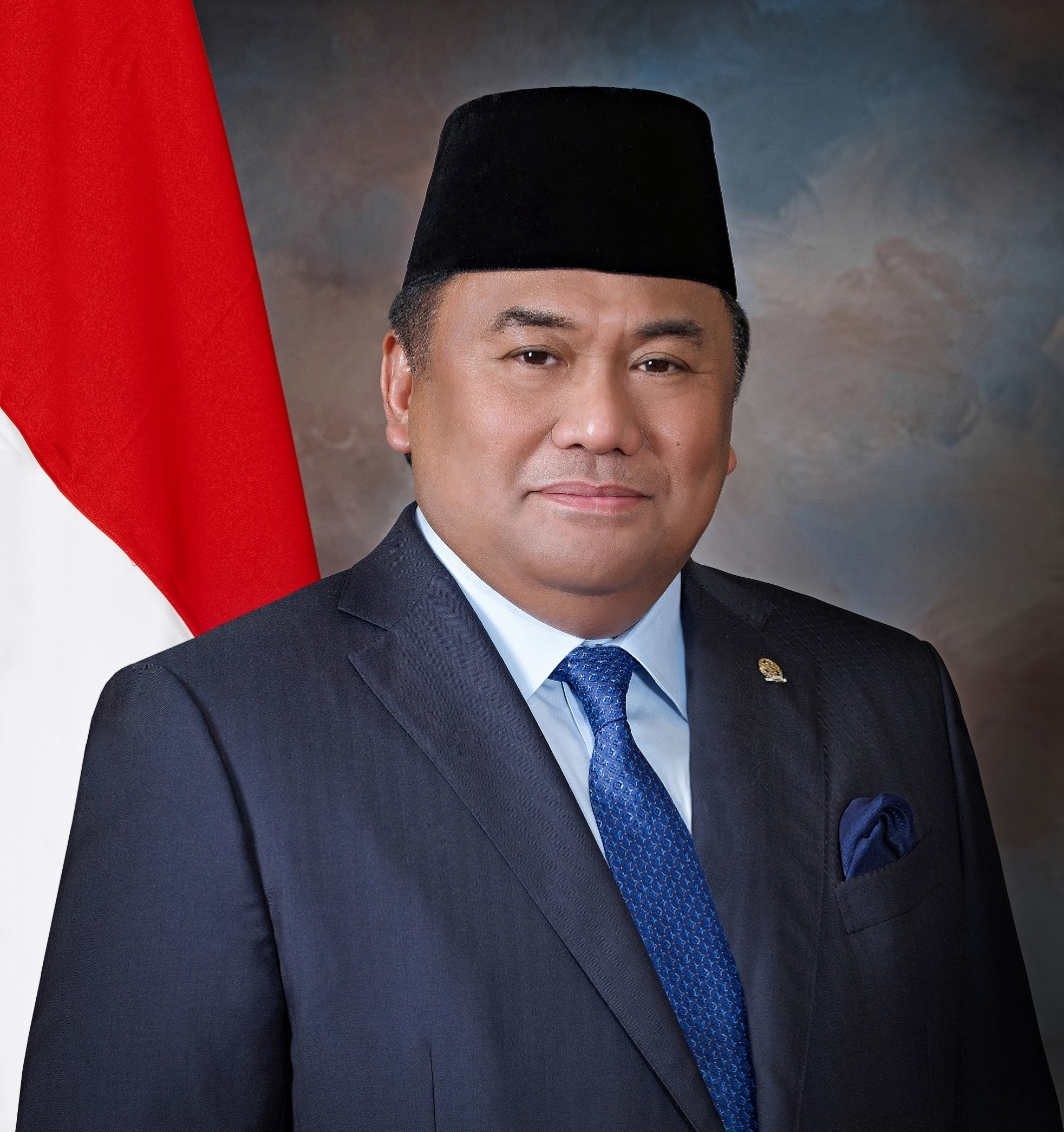

Deputy Speaker of the House of Representatives
- In office 1 October 2019 – 1 October 2024
- Speaker: Puan Maharani

33rd Minister of Trade of Indonesia
- In office 27 October 2014 – 12 August 2015
- President: Joko Widodo
- Preceded by: Muhammad Lutfi
- Succeeded by: Thomas Trikasih Lembong

Member of the House of Representatives
- In office 1 October 2019 – 10 July 2026
- Parliamentary group: NasDem Faction
- Constituency: Gorontalo

Personal details
- Born: 3 September 1962 Jakarta, Indonesia
- Died: 10 July 2026 (aged 63) Jakarta, Indonesia
- Party: NasDem (2016–2026)
- Spouse: Retno Damayanti
- Children: 2
- Parents: Thayeb Mohammad Gobel (father); Annie Nento Gobel (mother)
- Education: Chuo University

Rachmad Gobel (3 September 1962 – 10 July 2026) was an Indonesian businessman and politician from Gorontalo. His family controls the company, Gobel Group which is now called PT. Panasonic Gobel Indonesia, an Indonesian division of Panasonic. He was also the former Minister of Trade and the Indonesian President's Special Envoy to Japan. He was the Deputy Speaker of the House of Representatives.

== Early life and education ==
Gobel was the fifth child and first son of businessman Thayeb Mohammad Gobel and his wife Annie Nento Gobel from Gorontalo. Thayeb Gobel was well known as the founder of the business group and pioneered electronics industry in Indonesia. Thayeb was also a business partner of Kōnosuke Matsushita, the founder of Panasonic.

From childhood he was educated to become the heir and leader of the Gobel business group, founded and led by his father. After graduating from high school in Jakarta in 1981, Rachmad Gobel chose to continue his studies in Japan at the Chuo University. After four years he completed his studies at the Department of International Trade.

In 1984, Gobel attended Chuo University in Tokyo, Japan where he graduated with a Bachelor of International Trade Studies. In 2002, he received an honorary Doctorate from the Takushoku University. In 2014, he received another honorary doctorate from Chuo University.

== Business career ==
=== Panasonic ===
In 1989, Gobel returned to Indonesia and was appointed assistant to the President Director of PT. Panasonic Gobel (now PT. Panasonic Indonesia). The company is a joint venture between Japan and Indonesia in the field of industrial manufacturing of electronics, which was established in 1970. In 1991, Gobel was officially appointed member of the board of directors to oversee company's management planning.

In 1993, he was appointed Vice President Director of PT. National Gobel (now PT. Panasonic Manufacturing Indonesia). Since 2002, Rachmad has served as Commissioner of PT. National Gobel (now PT. Panasonic Manufacturing Indonesia). He was also the principal at PT. Apple Indonesia.

=== Kadin ===
In 2002, Gobel sat as Chairman of Kadin Indonesia Field of Metal, Machinery, Chemicals and Electronics. When a change of leadership occurred in Chamber of Commerce and Industry of Indonesia the chairman Mohamad Suleman Hidayat in February 2004 Rachmad was reappointed for another four years.

== Political career ==
=== Minister for Trade ===
Gobel was appointed by President Joko Widodo as Trade Minister in the Working Cabinet in 2014. He was one of the ministers selected from a professional representative. One year after his appointment, due to a cabinet reshuffle, he was removed as minister. He was replaced by Thomas Trikasih Lembong.

=== House of Representatives ===
Gobel ran for a legislative seat in the 2019 elections, and was elected into the People's Representative Council representing Gorontalo after winning 146,067 seats. He was appointed one of the body's deputy speakers. He was reelected for a second term in the 2024 election with 195,332 votes.

== Death ==
Gobel died in Jakarta on 10 July 2026, at the age of 63.
