= Order of precedence in Indonesia =

Relative preeminence of officials for ceremonial purposes

The Indonesian order of precedence is a nominal and symbolic hierarchy of important positions within the Government of Indonesia. It has legal standing and is used to dictate ceremonial protocol at events of a national nature.

== Indonesian order of precedence ==
Law No. 9 of 2010 on Protocol provides a separate Indonesian order of precedence at national level, provincial level, and municipal and regency level. Although came to force on 19 October 2010, the following lists precedence of offices and their holders as of November 2026.

=== National level ===
Rank	Position	Incumbent
1	President	Prabowo Subianto
2	Vice President	Vacant
3	Former presidents and vice presidents	Former presidents by departure from office: Megawati Sukarnoputri (20 October 2004); Susilo Bambang Yudhoyono (20 October 2014); Joko Widodo (20 October 2024); Former vice presidents by departure from office: Boediono (20 October 2014); Jusuf Kalla (20 October 2019); Ma'ruf Amin (20 October 2024); Gibran Rakabuming Raka (12 November 2026)
4	Speaker of the People's Consultative Assembly (MPR)	Ahmad Muzani
5	Speaker of the House of Representatives (DPR)	Puan Maharani
6	Speaker of the Regional Representative Council (DPD)	Sultan Bachtiar Najamudin
7	Chairman of the Audit Board (BPK)	Isma Yatun
8	Chief Justice of the Supreme Court (MA)	Sunarto
9	Chief Justice of the Constitutional Court (MK)	Suhartoyo
10	Chairman of the Judicial Commission (KY)	Abdul Chair Ramadhan
11	Founding fathers of national independence and their families and descendants together with living veterans of the National Revolution and their families	Refer to the Ministry of the State Secretariat
12	Ambassadors and permanent representatives	Refer to the Ministry of Foreign Affairs
13	Deputy Speakers of the People's Consultative Assembly (MPR)	Bambang Wuryanto; Kahar Muzakir; Lestari Moerdijat; Rusdi Kirana; Hidayat Nur Wahid; Eddy Soeparno; Edhie Baskoro Yudhoyono; Abcandra Akbar Supratman
13	Deputy Speakers of the House of Representatives (DPR)	Sufmi Dasco Ahmad; Saan Mustopa; Sari Yuliati; Cucun Ahmad Syamsurijal
13	Deputy Speakers of the Regional Representative Council (DPD)	GKR Hemas; Yorrys Raweyai; Tamsil Linrung
13	Governor of the Central Bank (BI)	Destry Damayanti
13	Chairman of the General Elections Commission (KPU)	Mochammad Afifuddin
13	Chairman of the General Election Supervisory Agency (BAWASLU)	Rahmat Bagja
13	Chairman of the Election Organisation Ethics Council (DKPP)	Heddy Lugito
13	Deputy Chairman of the Audit Board (BPK)	Budi Prijono
13	Deputy Chief Justices of the Supreme Court (MA)	Suharto; Dwiarso Budi Santiarto
13	Deputy Chief Justice of the Constitutional Court (MK)	Saldi Isra
13	Deputy Chairman of the Judicial Commission (KY)	Desmihardi
14	Cabinet Ministers	Refer here
14	Cabinet-level officials	Refer here
14	Members of the House of Representatives (DPR)	Refer here
14	Senators of the Regional Representative Council (DPD)	Refer here
14	Indonesian Ambassadors, Extraordinary and Plenipotentiary	Refer to the Ministry of Foreign Affairs
15	Chief of Staff of the Army	Tandyo Budi Revita
15	Chief of Staff of the Navy	Muhammad Ali
15	Chief of Staff of the Air Force	Mohamad Tony Harjono
16	Leaders of the political parties represented in the House of Representatives (DPR)	By the number of seats: Megawati Sukarnoputri (PDI-P) (mentioned above ranked higher as former President); Bahlil Lahadalia (Golkar) (mentioned above ranked higher as Minister of Energy and Mineral Resources); Prabowo Subianto (Gerindra) (mentioned above ranked higher as President); Surya Paloh (NasDem); Muhaimin Iskandar (PKB) (mentioned above ranked higher as Coordinating Minister for Social Empowerment); Al Muzzammil Yusuf (PKS); Zulkifli Hasan (PAN) (mentioned above ranked higher as Coordinating Minister for Food Affairs); Agus Harimurti Yudhoyono (Demokrat) (mentioned above ranked higher as Coordinating Minister for Infrastructure and Regional Development)
17	Members of the Audit Board (BPK)	Refer here
17	Presiding officers and justices of the Supreme Court (MA)	Refer here
17	Justices of the Constitutional Court (MK)	Refer here
17	Members of the Judicial Commission (KY)	Refer here
18	Officers leading state institutions	Refer to the Ministry of State Secretariat
18	Leaders of state institutions established by law	Refer to the Ministry of State Secretariat
18	Senior Deputy Governor of the Central Bank (BI)	Aida S. Budiman
18	Deputy Governors of the Central Bank (BI)	Refer here
18	Deputy Chairman of the General Elections Commission (KPU)	None
18	Deputy Chairman of the General Election Supervisory Agency (BAWASLU)	None
18	Deputy Chairman of the Election Organisation Ethics Council (DKPP)	None
19	Provincial governors	Refer here
20	Members of Indonesian orders, decorations, and medals	Refer to the Ministry of State Secretariat
21	Leaders of non-ministerial government institutions	Refer here
21	Deputy Ministers	Refer here
21	Deputy Chief of Staff of the Army	Tri Budi Utomo
21	Deputy Chief of Staff of the Navy	Edwin
21	Deputy Chief of Staff of the Air Force	Tedi Rizalihadi
21	Deputy Chief of the National Police	Wahyu Hadiningrat
21	Deputy Attorney General	Feri Wibisono
21	Provincial vice governors	Refer to the respective Provincial Government
21	Speaker of the Provincial Regional House of Representatives (DPRD I)	Refer to the respective DPRD I
21	Echelon I officers	Refer to the respective ministry, institution or office
22	Mayors and regents	Refer to the respective Municipal or Regency Government
22	Speaker of the Municipal or Regency Regional House of Representatives (DPRD II)	Refer to the respective DPRD II
23	Leaders of national-level religious organisations recognised by the Government and the People	Refer to the Ministry of Religious Affairs

=== Provincial level ===
Rank	Position	Incumbent
1	Governor	Refer to the respective Provincial Government
2	Vice Governor	Refer to the respective Provincial Government
3	Former governors and vice governors	Refer to the respective Provincial Government
4	Speaker of DPRD I	Refer to the respective DPRD I
5	Consul of foreign countries located in the region	Refer to the Ministry of Foreign Affairs
6	Deputy Speakers of DPRD I	Refer to the respective DPRD I
7	Provincial Secretary	Refer to the respective Provincial Government
7	Provincial chief of the Armed Forces	Refer to the National Armed Forces
7	Provincial Police Chief	Refer to the National Police
7	Chief Justices of provincial courts	Refer to the respective provincial court
7	Provincial Attorney General	Refer to the respective Provincial Attorney General's Chambers
8	Leaders of political parties represented in DPRD I	Refer to the respective DPRD I
9	Members of DPRD I	Refer to the respective DPRD I
10	Mayors and regents	Refer to the respective Municipal or Regency Government
11	Head of provincial office of BPK	Refer to BPK
11	Head of provincial office of the Central Bank	Refer to the Central Bank
11	Head of provincial KPU	Refer to the respective Provincial KPU
11	Head of provincial BAWASLU	Refer to the respective Provincial BAWASLU
12	Religious leaders	Refer to the respective provincial office of the Ministry of Religious Affairs
12	Traditional leaders	Refer to the respective Provincial Government
12	Certain community figure	Refer to the respective Provincial Government
13	Speaker of DPRD II	Refer to the respective DPRD II
14	Vice mayors and vice regents	Refer to the respective Municipal or Regency Government
14	Deputy speakers of DPRD II	Refer to the respective DPRD II
15	Members of DPRD II	Refer to the respective DPRD II
16	Assistant Provincial Secretary	Refer to the respective Provincial Government
16	Head of Provincial Government offices	Refer to the respective Provincial Government
16	Head of Central Government offices at province	Refer to the respective Provincial Government
16	Head of provincial bodies	Refer to the respective Provincial Government
16	Echelon II officers	Refer to the respective Provincial Government
17	Echelon III officers	Refer to the respective Provincial Government

=== Municipal and regency level ===
Rank	Position	Incumbent
1	Mayor or Regent	Refer to the respective Municipal or Regency Government
2	Vice Mayor or Vice Regent	Refer to the respective Municipal or Regency Government
3	Former mayors and regents	Refer to the respective Municipal or Regency Government
3	Former vice mayors and vice regents	Refer to the respective Municipal or Regency Government
4	Speaker of DPRD II	Refer to the respective DPRD II
5	Deputy Speaker of DPRD II	Refer to the respective DPRD II
6	Municipal or Regency Secretary	Refer to the respective Municipal or Regency Government
6	Municipal or regency chief of the Armed Forces	Refer to the Armed Forces' Contingent at the respective Province
6	Municipal or regency Police Chief	Refer to the Police Contingent at the respective Province
6	Chief Justices of municipal or regency courts	Refer to the respective municipal or regency court
6	Municipal or Regency Attorney	Refer to the respective Municipal or Regency Attorney's Chambers
7	Leaders of the political parties represented in DPRD II	Refer to the respective DPRD II
8	Members of DPRD II	Refer to the respective DPRD II
9	Religious leaders	Refer to the respective municipal or regency office of the Ministry of Religious Affairs
9	Traditional leaders	Refer to the respective Municipal or Regency Government
9	Certain community figure	Refer to the respective Municipal or Regency Government
10	Assistant Municipal or Regency Secretary	Refer to the respective Municipal or Regency Government
10	Head of municipal or regency bodies	Refer to the respective Municipal or Regency Government
10	Head of Municipal or Regency Government offices	Refer to the respective Municipal or Regency Government
10	Echelon II officers	Refer to the respective Municipal or Regency Government
10	Head of Central Bank office at Regency	Refer to the Central Bank office at the respective Province
10	Head of Municipal or Regency KPU	Refer to the respective Municipal or Regency KPU
10	Head of Municipal or Regency BAWASLU	Refer to the respective Municipal or Regency BAWASLU
11	Head of Central Government offices at Municipality or Regency	Refer to the respective Municipal or Regency Government
11	Head of technical implementation unit at Central Government offices	Refer to the respective Municipal or Regency Government
11	District chief of the Armed Forces	Refer to the Armed Forces' Contingent at Municipality or Regency
11	District Police Chief	Refer to the Police Contingent at Municipality or Regency
12	Head of Municipal or Regency Government divisions	Refer to the respective Municipal or Regency Government
12	District chief	Refer to the respective Municipal or Regency Government
12	Echelon III officers	Refer to the respective Municipal or Regency Government
13	Village or neighbourhood chief	Refer to the respective Municipal or Regency Government
13	Echelon IV officers	Refer to the respective Municipal or Regency Government
