= Yandri Susanto =

Indonesian politician (born 1974)

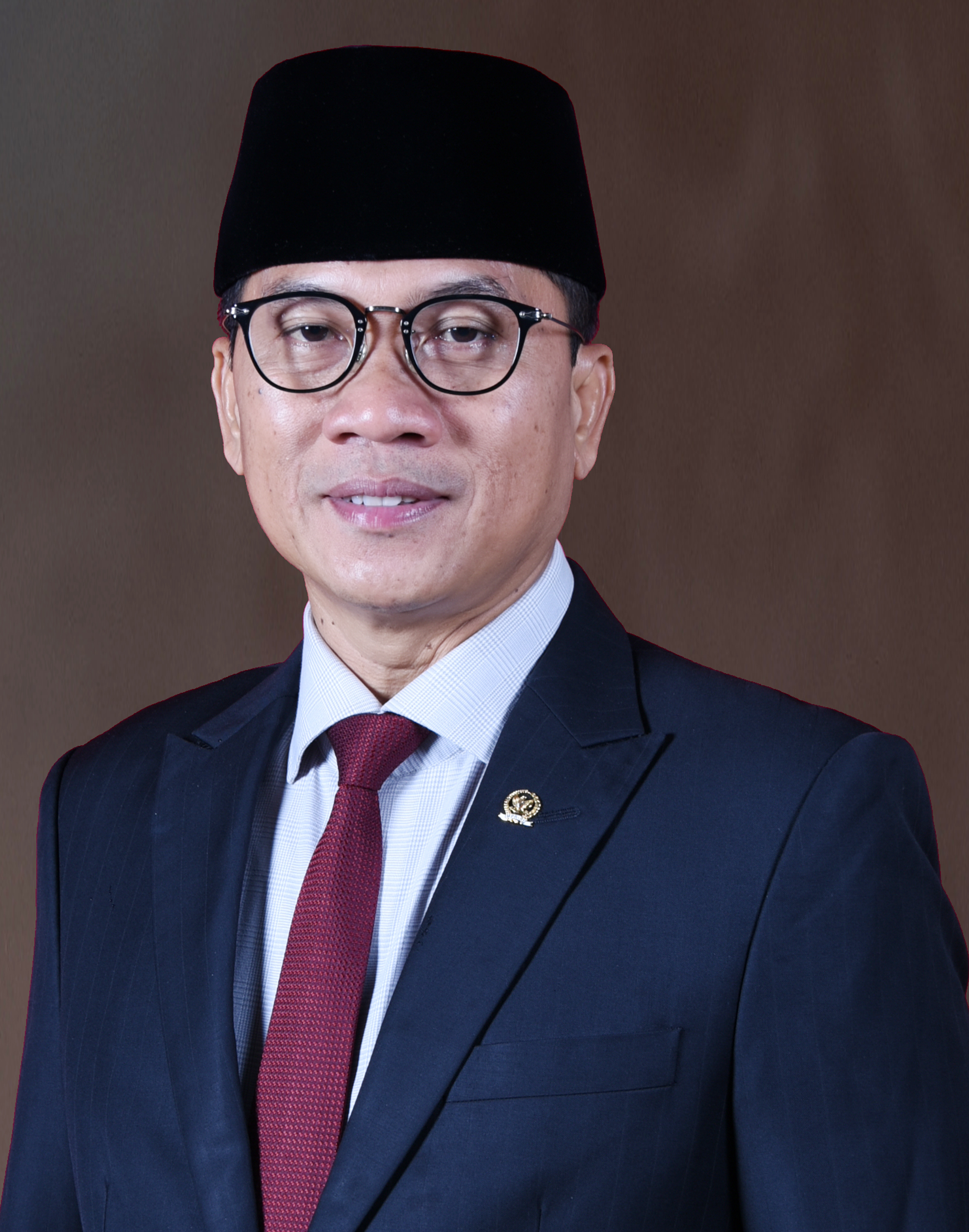

Minister of Villages and Development of Disadvantaged Regions
- Incumbent
- Assumed office 21 October 2024
- President: Prabowo Subianto
- Deputy: Ahmad Riza Patria
- Preceded by: Abdul Halim Iskandar

Deputy Speaker of the People's Consultative Assembly
- In office 30 June 2022 – 30 September 2024 Serving with Period 2024–29: Ahmad Basarah; Ahmad Muzani; Lestari Moerdijat; Hidayat Nur Wahid; Jazilul Fawaid; Arsul Sani; Syarief Hasan; Fadel Muhammad
- Speaker: Bambang Soesatyo
- Preceded by: Zulkifli Hasan
- Succeeded by: Period 2024–29: Abcandra Akbar Supratman; Bambang Wuryanto; Kahar Muzakir; Lestari Moerdijat; Rusdi Kirana; Hidayat Nur Wahid; Eddy Soeparno; Edhie Baskoro Yudhoyono

Personal details
- Born: Yandri Susanto; 7 November 1974 (age 51) Kedurang, South Bengkulu, Bengkulu
- Party: National Mandate Party
- Spouse: Ratu Rachmatuzakiyah
- Children: 3

Yandri Susanto (born 7 November 1974) is an Indonesian politician of the National Mandate Party serving as Minister of Villages and Development of Disadvantaged Regions since 2024. He was a member of the House of Representatives from 2012 to 2024, and served as a deputy speaker of the People's Consultative Assembly from 2022 to 2024.
