= List of speakers of the People's Consultative Assembly =

Presiding Officer Of People's Consultative Assembly of the Republic of

Speaker of People's Consultative Assembly of Indonesia
- Insignia of the People's Consultative Assembly (Congress) of Indonesia

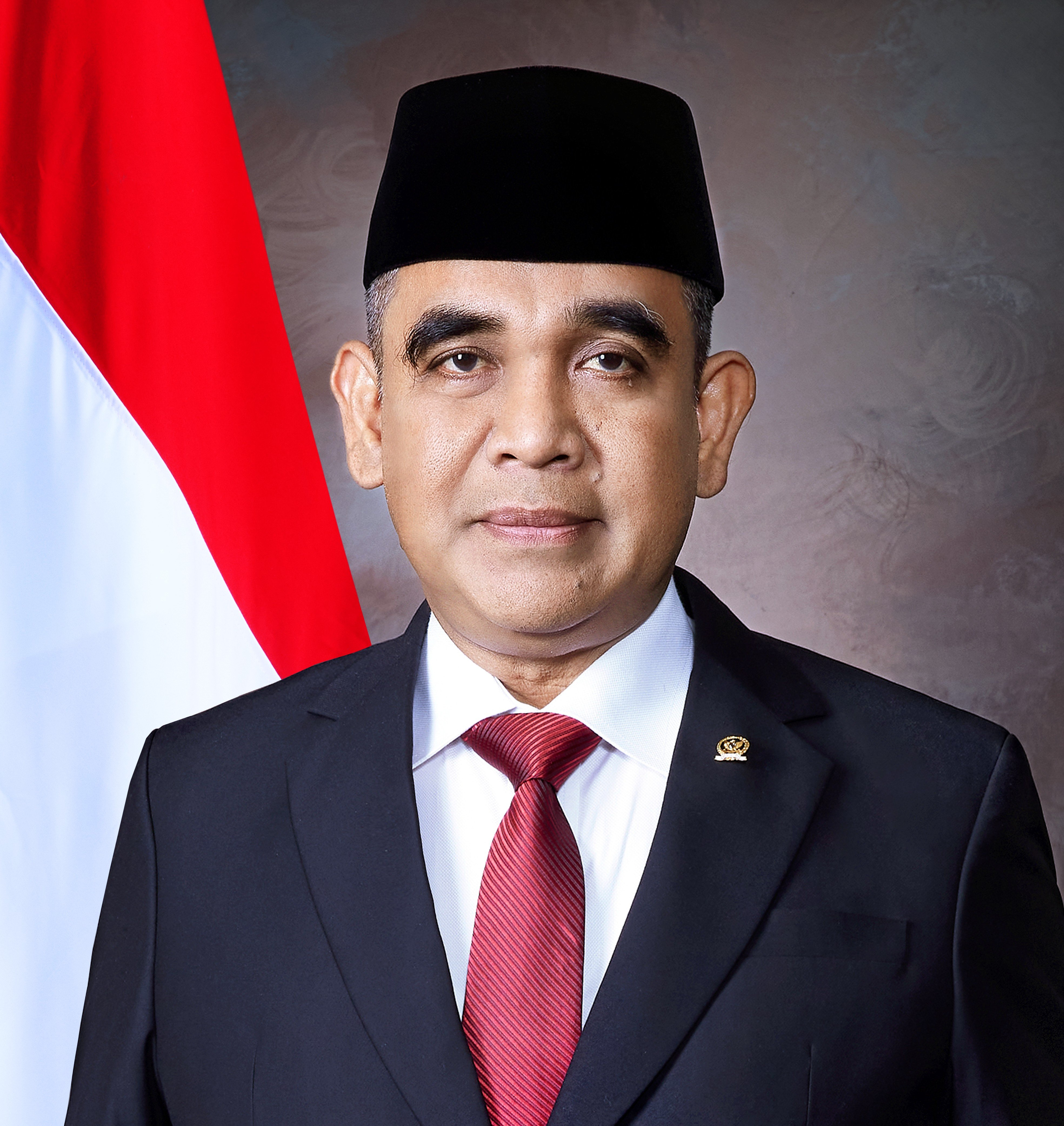
- Incumbent; Ahmad Muzani since 3 October 2024
- People's Consultative Assembly of the Republic of Indonesia
- Style: Mr. Speaker (informal – male); Madam Speaker (informal – female); The Right Honourable (formal); His Excellency (Respected Title)
- Status: Presiding officer & Head Of Legislative Branch
- Member of: People's Consultative Assembly of the Republic of Indonesia
- Residence: Rumah Dinas Ketua MPR RI (Official) Kompleks Kediaman Pimpinan MPR/DPR/DPD Plaza Legislatif IKN Nusantara (Coming Soon)
- Seat: MPR/DPR/DPD building, Speaker Office, Jakarta
- Appointer: People's Consultative Assembly
- Term length: 5 year
- Formation: 5 July 1959
- First holder: Chaerul Saleh
- Deputy: Deputy Speaker
- Website: Official website

The Speaker of the People's Consultative Assembly of the Republic of Indonesia or Chairperson Of People's Consultative Assembly of the Republic of Indonesia is one of the leaders Or The Head of the People's Consultative Assembly (MPR), elected by the members of the MPR And Highest Ranking Official Of Government And People Consultative Assembly

The MPR leadership is responsible for:

1. leading MPR sessions and summarizing the results of the sessions for decision-making;
2. preparing work plans and dividing the work between the speaker and deputy speaker
3. serving as the MPR spokesperson;
4. implementing MPR decisions;
5. coordinating MPR members to promote Pancasila, the 1945 Constitution of the Republic of Indonesia, the Unitary State of the Republic of Indonesia, and Bhinneka Tunggal Ika;
6. representing the MPR in court;
7. determining the direction and general budget policies of the MPR; and
8. submitting a performance report to the MPR plenary session at the end of the term.

== Powers And Facilities ==
- Powers*

- Preside over MPR sessions - Maintain order and discipline - Manage members (discipline, remove, etc.) - Allow speeches the President/Vice President - Impeachment proceedings - Call meetings (regular, special, emergency)

- VIP/VVIP Facilities*

- Office space and equipment - Meetings and events - Diplomatic role (meet foreign dignitaries, represent MPR) - Residence (official or personal with high protection) - Support staff - Resources (research, administrative) - Vehicles (official cars, aircraft, etc.) - Protection and Security (Parliamentary Leadership Security Forces, TNI, Polri, Executive & Military Aide)

No	Photo	Name	Assumed office	Left office	Term	Party	Notes	Deputies
1		Chaerul Saleh (1916–1967)	15 September 1960	18 March 1966	1	Murba		Idham Chalid; Ali Sastroamidjojo; Wilujo Puspojudo; D.N. Aidit
–		Wiluyo Puspoyudo (1919–1968) (acting)	18 March 1966	20 June 1966	1	Military		Idham Chalid; Ali Sastroamidjojo
2		Abdul Haris Nasution (1918–2000)	20 June 1966	28 October 1971	2	Military (League of Supporters of Indonesian Independence)		Osa Maliki; Mashudi; Mohammad Subchan Z.E. Melanchton Siregar
3		Idham Chalid (1921–2010)	28 October 1971	30 September 1977	3	NU	(Note: Merged with the position of Speaker of the People's Representative Council.)	Sumiskum; Jailani Naro; Domo Pranoto (1971–1977); Muhammad Sudjono (1977); Mohammad Isnaeni
4		Adam Malik (1917–1984)	1 October 1977	23 March 1978	4	Golkar		Mashuri Saleh; Masjkur; Kartidjo; Mohammad Isnaeni (1977–1982); Hardjantho Soemodisastro (1982); Achmad Lamo
5		Daryatmo (1925–1992)	23 March 1978	30 September 1982	4	Golkar		Mashuri Saleh; Masjkur; Kartidjo; Mohammad Isnaeni (1977–1982); Hardjantho Soemodisastro (1982); Achmad Lamo
6		Amir Machmud (1923–1995)	1 October 1982	30 September 1987	5	Golkar		Kharis Suhud; Amir Murtono; Hardjantho Soemodisastro; Nuddin Lubis; Soenandar Prijosoedarmo (1982–1984); Gustaf Hendrik Mantik (1984–1987)
7		Kharis Suhud (1925–2012)	1 October 1987	30 September 1992	6	Golkar		Syaiful Sulun; Raden Sukardi; Suryadi; Jailani Naro; Soeprapto
8		Wahono (1925–2004)	1 October 1992	30 September 1997	7	Golkar		Ismail Hasan Metareum; Suryadi; Soetedjo; John Ario Katili; Ahmad Amiruddin
9		Harmoko (1939–2021)	1 October 1997	30 September 1999	8	Golkar		Syarwan Hamid (1997–1998); Hari Sabarno (1998–1999); Abdul Gafur; Ismail Hasan Metareum; Fatimah Achmad; Poedjono Pranyoto
10		Amien Rais (born 1944)	3 October 1999	30 September 2004	9	PAN	(Note: Separated with the position of Speaker of the People's Representative Council.)	Ginandjar Kartasasmita; Kwik Kian Gie; Husnie Thamrin; Matori A. Djalil; Hari Sabarno; Oesman Sapta Odang; Jusuf Amir Feisal; Nazri Adlani
11		Hidayat Nur Wahid (born 1960)	7 October 2004	30 September 2009	10	PKS		Andi Mappetahang Fatwa; Aksa Mahmud; Mooryati Soedibyo
12		Taufiq Kiemas (1942–2013)	4 October 2009	8 June 2013	11	PDI-P		Hajriyanto Y. Thohari; Lukman Hakim Saifuddin (2009–2014); Achmad Dimyati Natakusumah (2014); Melani Leimena Suharli; Ahmad Farhan Hamid
13		Sidarto Danusubroto (born 1936)	8 July 2013	30 September 2014	11	PDI-P		Hajriyanto Y. Thohari; Lukman Hakim Saifuddin (2009–2014); Achmad Dimyati Natakusumah (2014); Melani Leimena Suharli; Ahmad Farhan Hamid
14		Zulkifli Hasan (born 1962)	8 October 2014	30 September 2019	12	PAN		Mahyudin; E.E. Mangindaan; Hidayat Nur Wahid; Oesman Sapta Odang; Since 2018: Ahmad Basarah; Ahmad Muzani; Muhaimin Iskandar
15		Bambang Soesatyo (born 1962)	3 October 2019	1 October 2024	13	Golkar		Ahmad Basarah; Ahmad Muzani; Lestari Moerdijat; Jazilul Fawaid; Syarief Hasan; Hidayat Nur Wahid; Zulkifli Hasan (2019–2022); Yandri Susanto (2022–2024); Arsul Sani (2019–2024); Amir Uskara (2024); Fadel Muhammad
16		Ahmad Muzani (born 1968)	3 October 2024	Incumbent	14	Gerindra		Bambang Wuryanto; Kahar Muzakir; Lestari Moerdijat; Rusdi Kirana; Hidayat Nur Wahid (2024–2026); Mohamad Sohibul Iman (2026–present); Eddy Soeparno; Edhie Baskoro Yudhoyono; Abcandra Akbar Supratman

Key:

- Murba
- Military
- Nahdlatul Ulama (NU)
- Golkar
- National Mandate Party (PAN)
- Prosperous Justice Party (PKS)
- Indonesian Democratic Party of Struggle (PDI-P)

== See also ==
- People's Consultative Assembly
- List of Deputy Speakers of the People's Consultative Assembly
- List of Speakers of the People's Representative Council
- List of Speakers of the Regional Representative Council

== Bibliography ==
- Yahya, Lip D. (July 2006), Ajengan Cipasung, Yogyakarta: Pustaka Pasantren, LKiS, ISBN 9798452208
- Junaedi, Didi (January 2014), Pahlawan-Pahlawan Indonesia Sepanjang Masa, Jakarta: Indonesia Tera, ISBN 978-9797752118
- Suryadinata, Leo (March 1982), Trends in Indonesia II: Proceedings and Background Paper, Singapore: Institute of Southeast Asian Studies, ISBN 9789971690397
- MPR/DPR RI (1997), Parlementaria: Majalah bulanan Dewan Perwakilan Rakyat Republik Indonesia, Volume 29, Jakarta: Bagian Hubungan Masyarakat DPR-RI
- Masuhara, Ayako (2015). The End of Personal Rule in Indonesia: Golkar and the Transformation of the Suharto Regime (Kyoto Area Studies on Asia). Kyoto: Kyoto University Press.
- Djamily, Mizwar (1986). Mengenal Kabinet RI Selama 40 Tahun Indonesia Merdeka [Indonesian Cabinet for 40 Years of the Independence of Indonesia] (in Indonesian). Jakarta: PT. Kreasi Jaya Utama.
- Gayatri, Sri Indera; Shalfiyanti; Amurwani; Dewi, Puspa; Purba, Isak (2009), Sejarah Pemikiran Indonesia III: 1967-1998, Jakarta: Ministry of Education and Culture of Indonesia
- MPR/DPR RI (1998), The DPR-RI Stance on the Reform Process and the Resignation of President Soeharto, Jakarta: Secretariat General of the People's Representative Council of Indonesia
- General Elections Commission (2013), Daftar Riwayat Hidup Bakal Calon Anggota DPR: Hidayat Nur Wahid (PDF)
