= List of deputy speakers of the People's Consultative Assembly =

Deputy Speakers of the People's Consultative Assembly

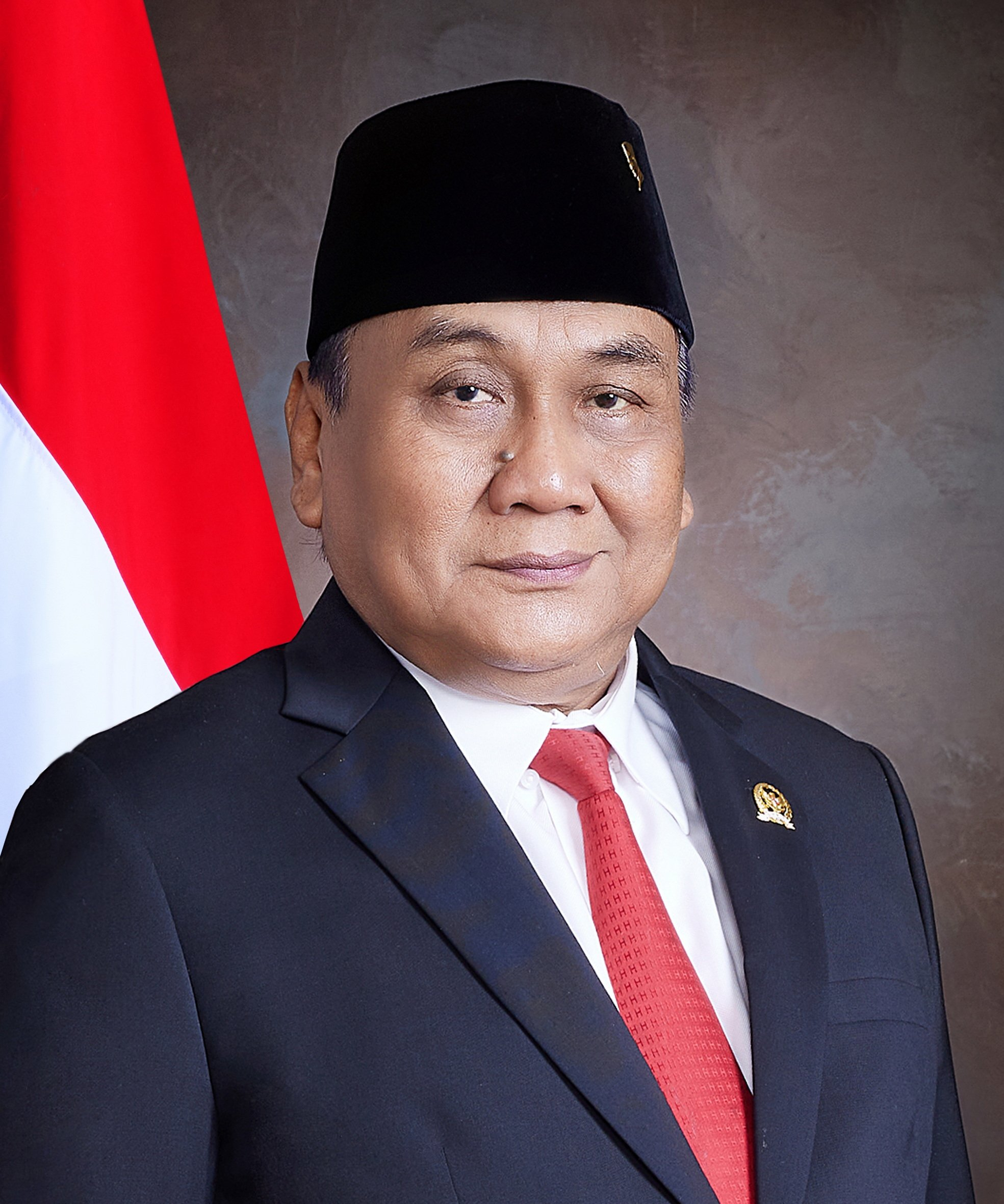
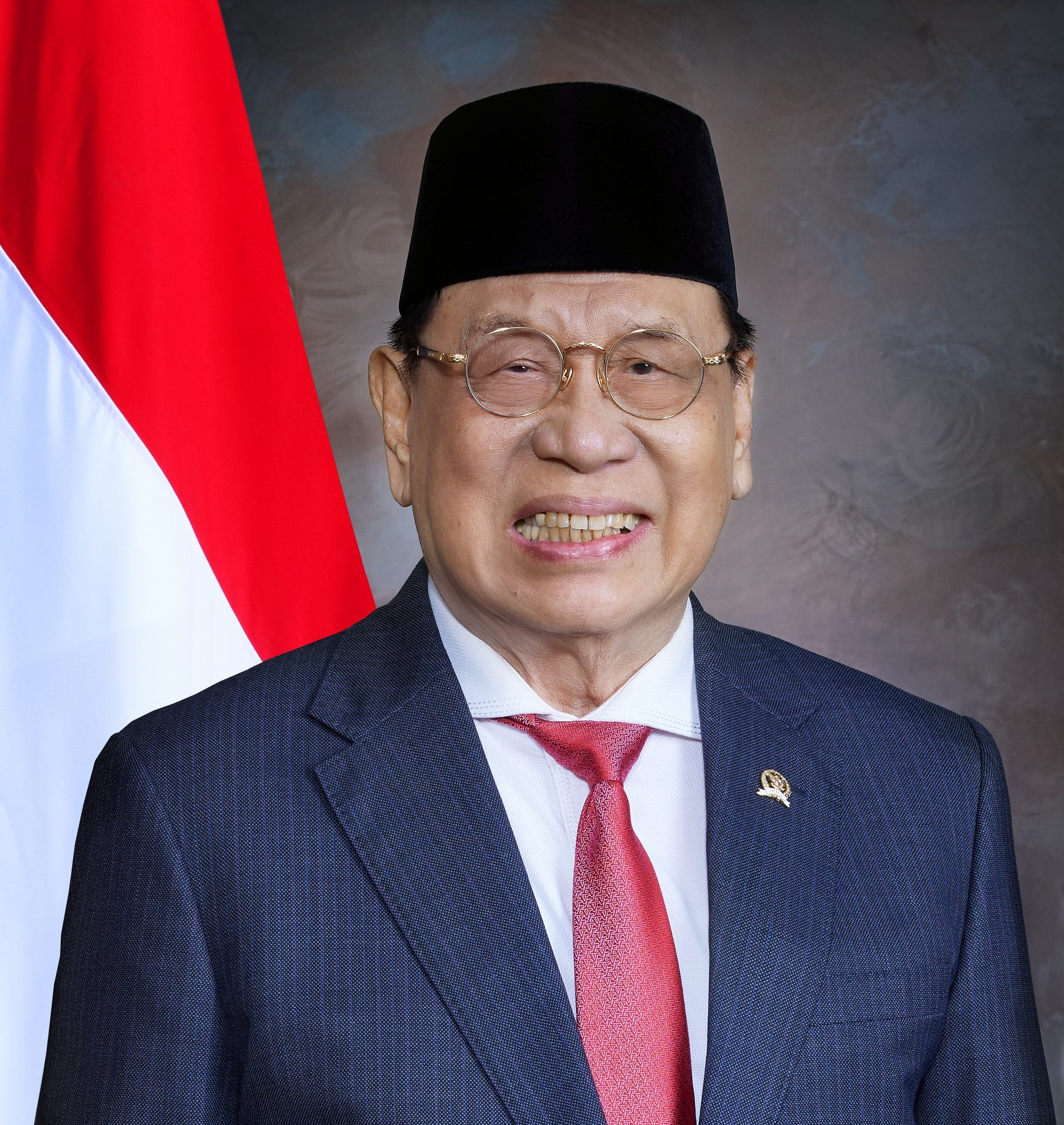
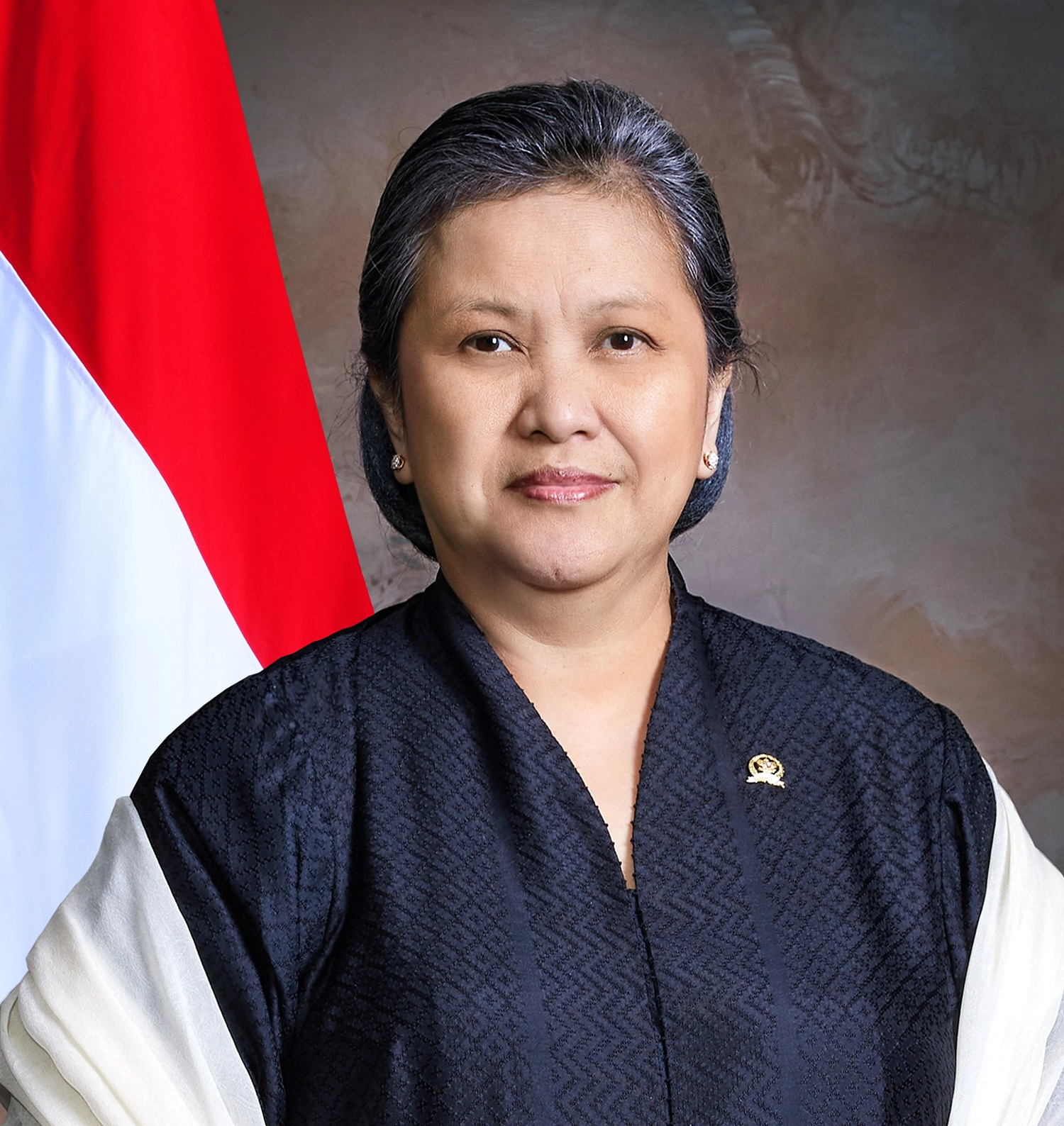
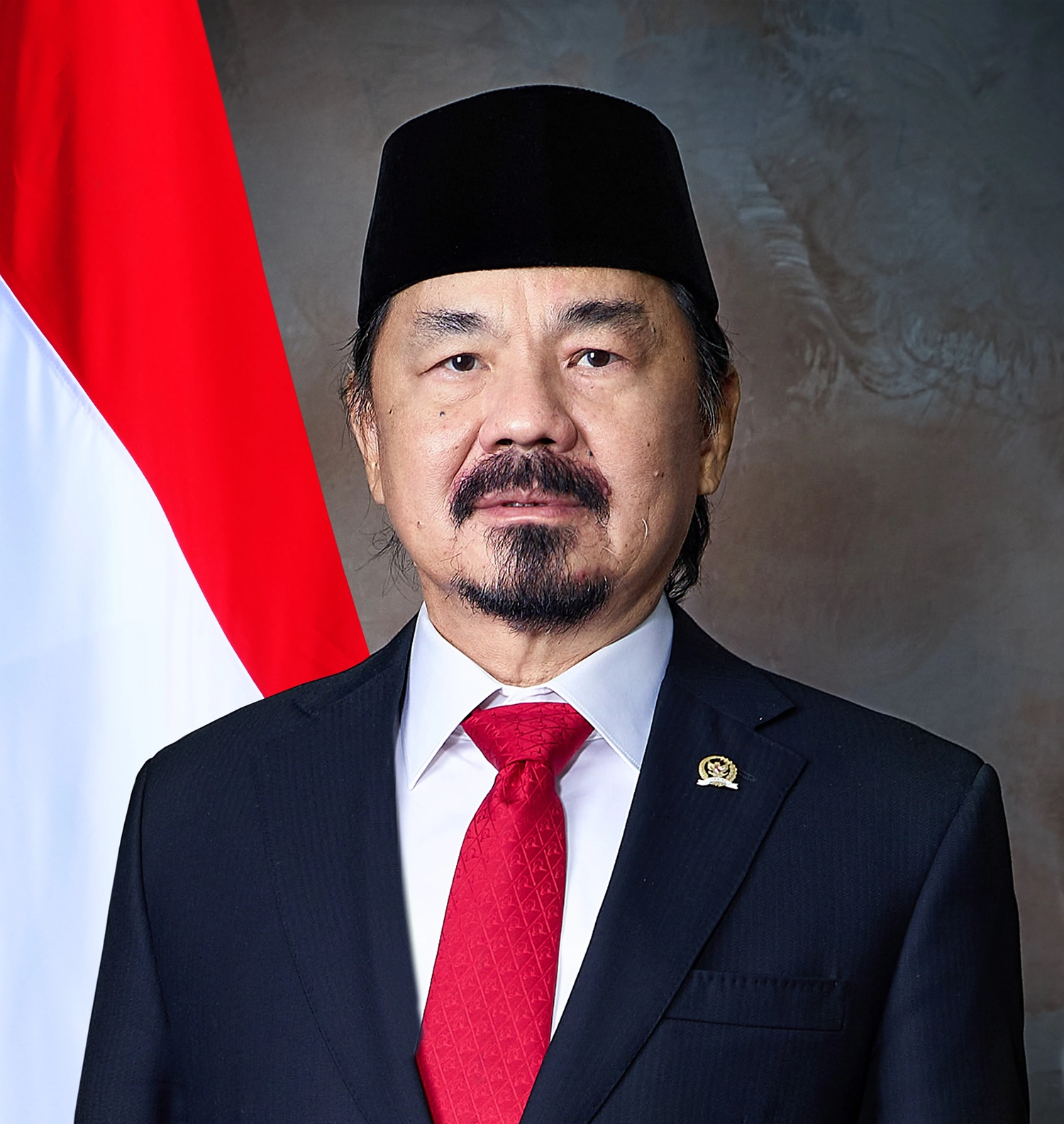
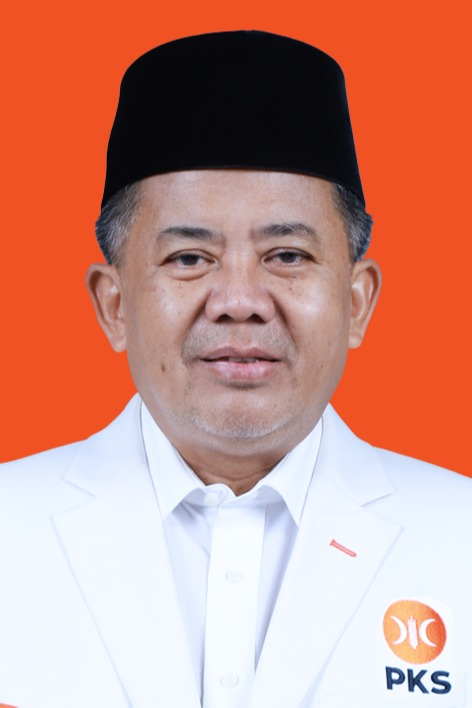
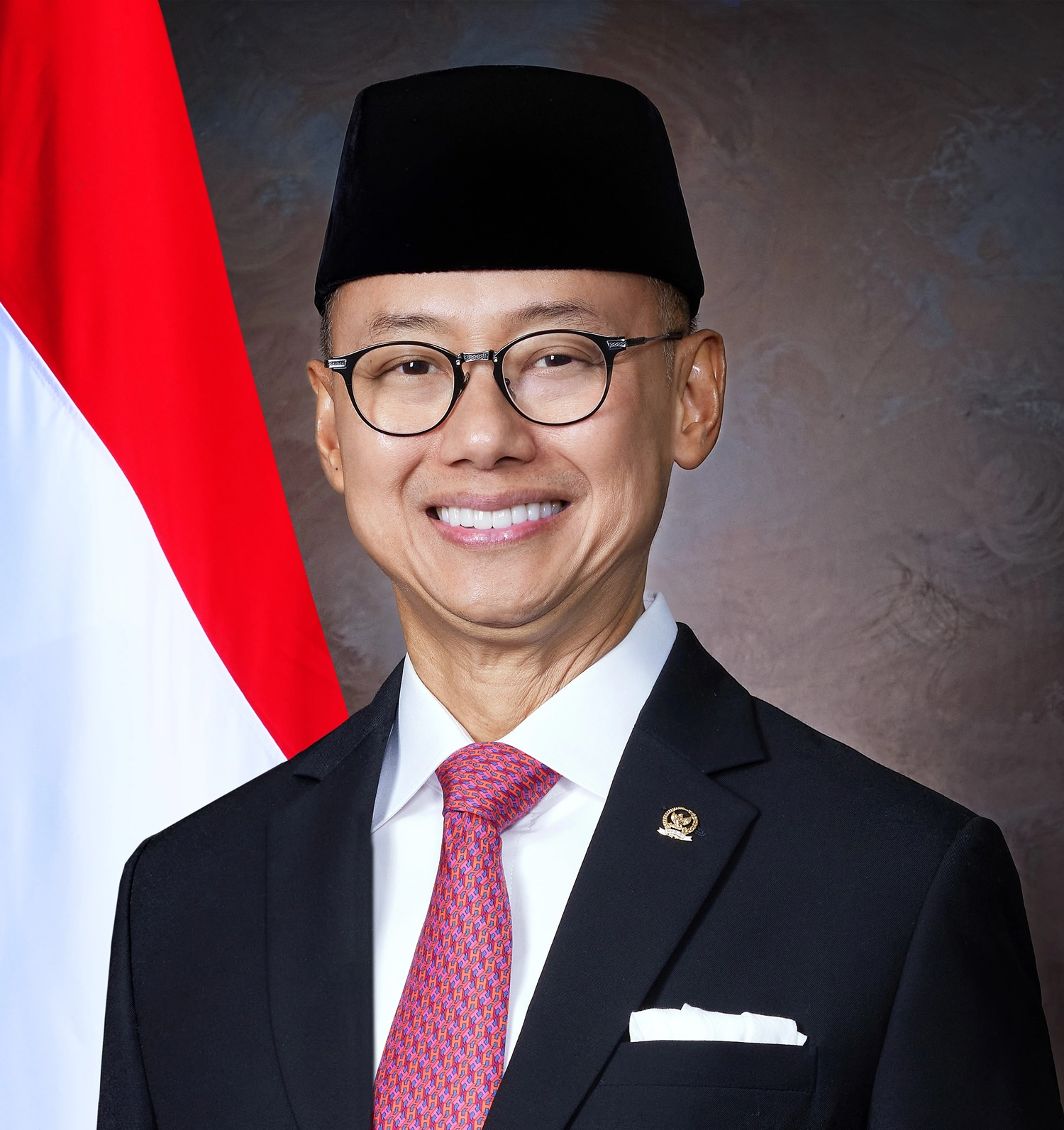
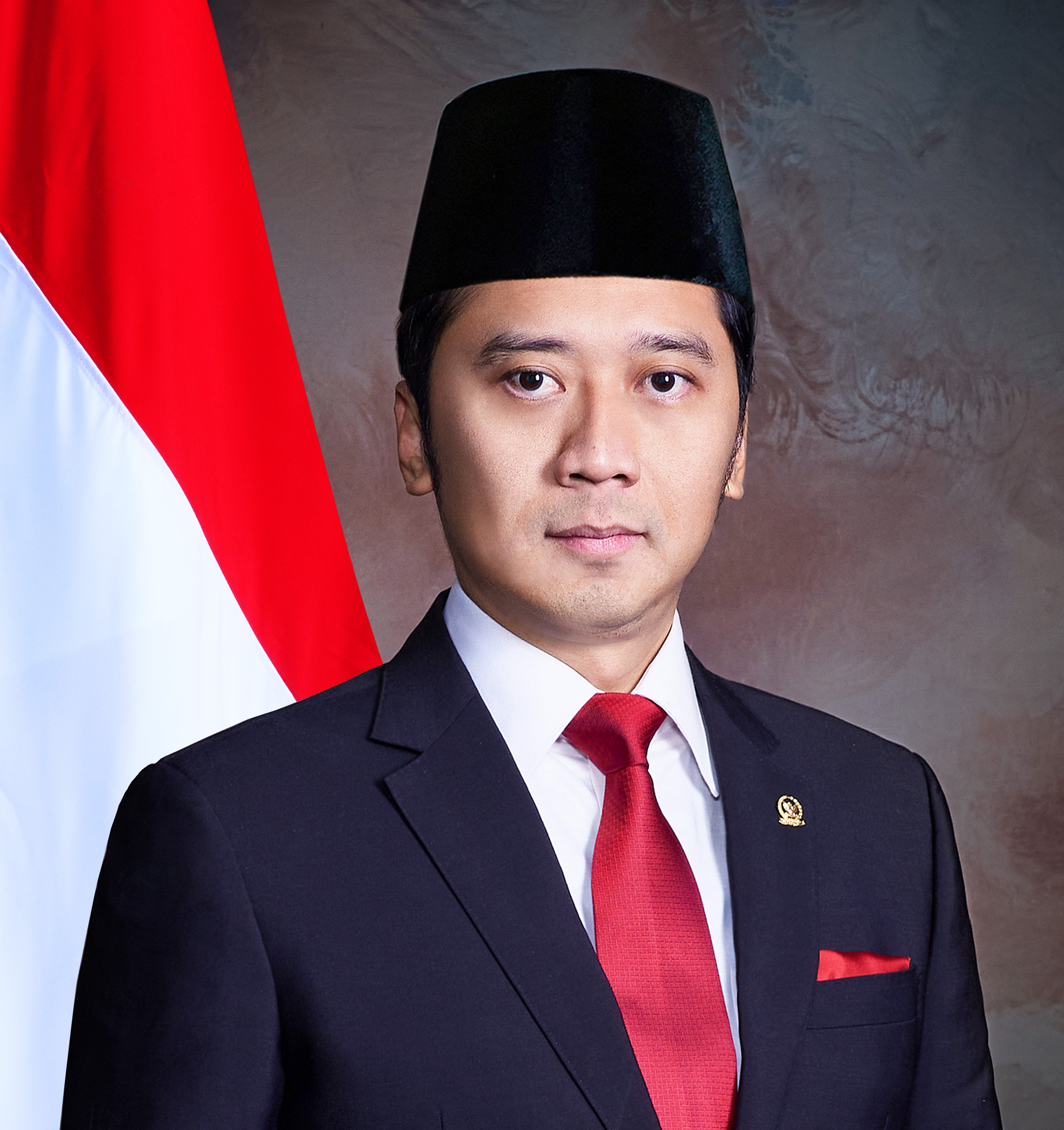
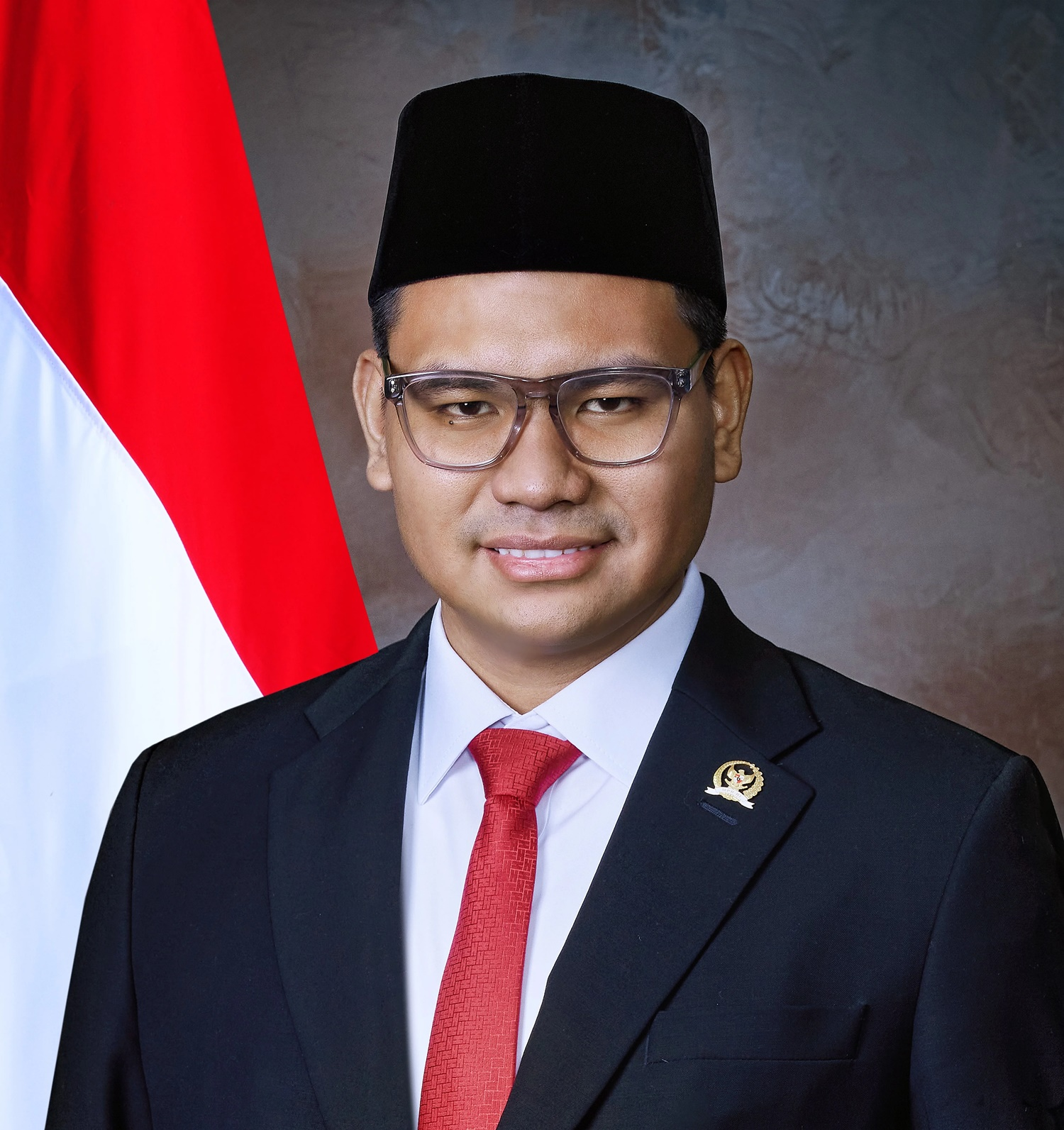
- Incumbent; Bambang Wuryanto; Kahar Muzakir; Lestari Moerdijat; Rusdi Kirana; Sohibul Iman; Eddy Soeparno; Edhie Baskoro Yudhoyono; Abcandra Akbar Supratman since 3 October 2024 since 16 November 2026 (Sohibul Iman)
- People's Consultative Assembly of the Republic of Indonesia
- Style: Mr. Deputy Speaker (informal – male); Madam Deputy Speaker (informal – female); The Right Honorable (formal); His/Her Excellency (Respected Title)
- Status: Presiding officer & Deputy Head Of Legislative Branch
- Member of: People's Consultative Assembly of the Republic of Indonesia
- Reports to: Speaker
- Seat: MPR/DPR/DPD building, Jakarta, Deputy Speaker Office
- Appointer: People's Consultative Assembly
- Term length: 5 years
- Inaugural holder: Idham Chalid; Ali Sastroamidjojo; Wilujo Puspojudo; D.N. Aidit
- Formation: 1960

The Deputy Speaker of the People's Consultative Assembly of the Republic of Indonesia is the leader of the People's Consultative Assembly (MPR) in addition to the speaker, who is elected from and by the members of the MPR. The MPR leadership is elected through deliberation for consensus and is confirmed in an MPR Plenary Session. If deliberation for consensus is not reached, the MPR leadership is elected by voting, and the person receiving the most votes is appointed as MPR leadership in the MPR Plenary Session. [1] The MPR leadership is responsible for: Presiding over MPR sessions and summarizing the session's results for decision-making; Preparing work plans and dividing work between the speaker and deputy speaker; Serving as spokesperson for the MPR; Implementing MPR decisions; Coordinating MPR members to promote Pancasila, the 1945 Constitution of the Republic of Indonesia, the Unitary State of the Republic of Indonesia, and Bhinneka Tunggal Ika; Representing the MPR in court; Determining the general direction and budget policies of the MPR; and Submit a report on the leadership's performance at the MPR plenary session at the end of the term.

| Term | Photo | Name | Assumed office | Left office | Fraction/Party | Notes | Speaker |
|---|---|---|---|---|---|---|---|
| 1 | | Idham Chalid | 15 September 1960 | 20 June 1966 | NU | | Chaerul Saleh (1960-1966) |
| 1 | | Ali Sastroamidjojo | 15 September 1960 | 20 June 1966 | PNI | | Chaerul Saleh (1960-1966) |
| 1 | | Wilujo Puspojudo | 15 September 1960 | 18 March 1966 | Military | | Wiluyo Puspoyudo (1966) |
| 1 | | Dipa Nusantara Aidit | 15 September 1960 | 1 October 1965 | PKI | | Wiluyo Puspoyudo (1966) |
| 2 | | Osa Maliki | 20 June 1966 | 14 September 1969 | PNI | | Abdul Haris Nasution |
| 2 | | Mashudi | 20 June 1966 | 28 October 1971 | Military | | Abdul Haris Nasution |
| 2 | | Mohammad Subchan Z. E. | 20 June 1966 | 28 October 1971 | NU | | Abdul Haris Nasution |
| 2 | | Melanchton Siregar | 20 June 1966 | 28 October 1971 | Parkindo | | Abdul Haris Nasution |
Period 1971–1977
| 3 | | Sumiskum | 28 October 1971 | 1 October 1977 | Golkar | | Idham Chalid |
| 3 | | Domo Pranoto | 28 October 1971 | 13 June 1977 | Military | | Idham Chalid |
| 3 | | Muhammad Sudjono | 20 June 1977 | 1 October 1977 | Military | | Idham Chalid |
| 3 | | Jailani Naro | 28 October 1971 | 1 October 1977 | Parmusi (1971-1973); PPP (1973-1977) | | Idham Chalid |
| 3 | | Mohammad Isnaeni | 28 October 1971 | 1 October 1977 | PNI (1971-1973); PDI (1973-1977) | | Idham Chalid |
Period 1977–1982
| 4 | | Mashuri Saleh | 1 October 1977 | 1 October 1982 | Golkar | | Adam Malik (1977-1978) |
| 4 | | Kartidjo | 1 October 1977 | 1 October 1982 | Military | | Adam Malik (1977-1978) |
| 4 | | Masykur | 1 October 1977 | 1 October 1982 | PPP | | Adam Malik (1977-1978) |
| 4 | | Mohammad Isnaeni | 1 October 1977 | 28 January 1982 | PDI | | Daryatmo (1978-1982) |
| 4 | | Hardjantho Soemodisastro | 28 January 1982 | 1 October 1982 | PDI | | Daryatmo (1978-1982) |
| 4 | | Achmad Lamo | 1 October 1977 | 1 October 1982 | Regional Representatives Fraction | | Daryatmo (1978-1982) |
Period 1982–1987
| 5 | | Amir Murtono | 1 October 1982 | 1 October 1987 | Golkar | | Amirmachmud |
| 5 | | Kharis Suhud | 1 October 1982 | 1 October 1987 | Military | | Amirmachmud |
| 5 | | Nuddin Lubis | 1 October 1982 | 1 October 1987 | PPP | | Amirmachmud |
| 5 | | Hardjantho Sumodisastro | 1 October 1982 | 1 October 1987 | PDI | | Amirmachmud |
| 5 | | Soenandar Prijosoedarmo | 1 October 1982 | 27 December 1984 | Regional Representatives Fraction | | Amirmachmud |
| 5 | | Gustaf Hendrik Mantik | 9 March 1985 | 1 October 1987 | Regional Representatives Fraction | | Amirmachmud |
Period 1987–1992
| 6 | | Sukardi | 1 October 1987 | 1 October 1992 | Golkar | | Kharis Suhud |
| 6 | | Saiful Sulun | 1 October 1987 | 1 October 1992 | Military | | Kharis Suhud |
| 6 | | Jailani Naro | 1 October 1987 | 1 October 1992 | PPP | | Kharis Suhud |
| 6 | | Suryadi | 1 October 1987 | 1 October 1992 | PDI | | Kharis Suhud |
| 6 | | Soeprapto | 1 October 1987 | 1 October 1992 | Regional Representatives Fraction | | Kharis Suhud |
Period 1992–1997
| 7 | | John Ario Katili | 1 October 1992 | 1 October 1997 | Golkar | | Wahono |
| 7 | | Soetedjo | 1 October 1992 | 1 October 1997 | Military | | Wahono |
| 7 | | Ismail Hasan Metareum | 1 October 1992 | 1 October 1997 | PPP | | Wahono |
| 7 | | Suryadi | 1 October 1992 | 1 October 1997 | PDI | | Wahono |
| 7 | | Ahmad Amiruddin | 1 October 1992 | 1 October 1997 | Regional Representatives Fraction | | Wahono |
Period 1997–1999
| 8 | | Abdul Gafur | 1 October 1997 | 1 October 1999 | Golkar | | Harmoko |
| 8 | | Syarwan Hamid | 1 October 1997 | 23 Mei 1998 | Military | (Note: Appointed as Minister of Home Affairs by President B. J. Habibie on 23 May 1998.) | Harmoko |
| 8 | | Hari Sabarno | 23 Mei 1998 | 1 October 1999 | Military | | Harmoko |
| 8 | | Ismail Hasan Metareum | 1 October 1997 | 1 October 1999 | PPP | | Harmoko |
| 8 | | Fatimah Achmad | 1 October 1997 | 1 October 1999 | PDI | | Harmoko |
| 8 | | Poedjono Pranyoto | 1 October 1997 | 1 October 1999 | Regional Representatives Fraction | | Harmoko |
Period 1999–2004
| 9 | | Kwik Kian Gie | 1 October 1999 | 26 October 1999 | PDI-P | (Note: Appointed as Coordinating Minister for Economic Affairs by President Abdurrahman Wahid on 26 October 1999.) | Amien Rais |
| 9 | | Soetjipto Soedjono | 26 October 1999 | 1 October 2004 | PDI-P | | Amien Rais |
| 9 | | Ginandjar Kartasasmita | 1 October 1999 | 1 October 2004 | Golkar | | Amien Rais |
| 9 | | Matori Abdul Djalil | 1 October 1999 | 9 August 2001 | PKB | (Note: Appointed as Minister of Defence by President Megawati Soekarnoputri on 9 August 2001.) | Amien Rais |
| 9 | | Cholil Bisri | 5 June 2002 | 23 August 2004 | PKB | (Note: Died in office.) | Amien Rais |
| 9 | | Husnie Thamrin | 1 October 1999 | 1 October 2004 | PPP | | Amien Rais |
| 9 | | Jusuf Amir Feisal | 1 October 1999 | 1 October 2004 | PBB | | Amien Rais |
| 9 | | Hari Sabarno | 1 October 1999 | 9 August 2001 | Military/Police | (Note: Appointed as Minister of Home Affairs by President Megawati Soekarnoputri on 9 August 2001.) | Amien Rais |
| 9 | | Agus Widjojo | 29 October 2001 | 7 November 2002 | Military/Police | | Amien Rais |
| 9 | | Slamet Supriadi | 11 November 2002 | 1 October 2004 | Military/Police | | Amien Rais |
| 9 | | Ahmad Nazri Adlani | 1 October 1999 | 1 October 2004 | Groups Representatives Fraction | | Amien Rais |
| 9 | | Oesman Sapta Odang | 11 August 2002 | 1 October 2004 | Regional Representatives Fraction | | Amien Rais |
Period 2004–2009
| 10 | | Andi Mappetahang Fatwa | 1 October 2004 | 1 October 2009 | PAN | | Hidayat Nur Wahid |
| 10 | | Aksa Mahmud | 1 October 2004 | 1 October 2009 | Regional Representative Council | | Hidayat Nur Wahid |
| 10 | | Mooryati Soedibyo | 1 October 2004 | 1 October 2009 | Regional Representative Council | | Hidayat Nur Wahid |
Period 2009–2014
| 11 | | Melani Leimena Suharli | 1 October 2009 | 1 October 2014 | Democratic Party | | Taufiq Kiemas (2009-2013) |
| 11 | | Hajriyanto Y. Thohari | 1 October 2009 | 1 October 2014 | Golkar | | Taufiq Kiemas (2009-2013) |
| 11 | | Ahmad Farhan Hamid | 1 October 2009 | 1 October 2014 | PAN | | Taufiq Kiemas (2009-2013) |
| 11 | | Lukman Hakim Saifuddin | 1 October 2009 | 9 June 2014 | PPP | (Note: Appointed as Minister of Religious Affairs by President Joko Widodo on 9 June 2014.) | Sidarto Danusubroto (2013-2014) |
| 11 | | Achmad Dimyati Natakusumah | 2 July 2014 | 1 October 2014 | PPP | | Sidarto Danusubroto (2013-2014) |
Period 2014–2019
| 12 | | Mahyudin | 8 October 2014 | 1 October 2019 | Golkar | | Zulkifli Hasan |
| 12 | | Evert Ernest Mangindaan | 8 October 2014 | 1 October 2019 | Democratic Party | | Zulkifli Hasan |
| 12 | | Hidayat Nur Wahid | 8 October 2014 | 1 October 2019 | PKS | | Zulkifli Hasan |
| 12 | | Oesman Sapta Odang | 8 October 2014 | 1 October 2019 | Regional Representative Council | | Zulkifli Hasan |
| 12 | | Ahmad Basarah | 26 March 2018 | 1 October 2019 | PDI-P | (Note: Appointed based on the revision of the Law on the MPR, DPR, DPRD and DPD (MD3).) | Zulkifli Hasan |
| 12 | | Ahmad Muzani | 26 March 2018 | 1 October 2019 | Gerindra | (Note: Appointed based on the revision of the Law on the MPR, DPR, DPRD and DPD (MD3).) | Zulkifli Hasan |
| 12 | | Muhaimin Iskandar | 26 March 2018 | 1 October 2019 | PKB | (Note: Appointed based on the revision of the Law on the MPR, DPR, DPRD and DPD (MD3).) | Zulkifli Hasan |
Period 2019–2024
| 13 | | Ahmad Basarah | 3 October 2019 | 1 October 2024 | PDI-P | | Bambang Soesatyo |
| 13 | | Ahmad Muzani | 3 October 2019 | 1 October 2024 | Gerindra | | Bambang Soesatyo |
| 13 | | Jazilul Fawaid | 3 October 2019 | 1 October 2024 | PKB | | Bambang Soesatyo |
| 13 | | Lestari Moerdijat | 3 October 2019 | 1 October 2024 | Nasdem | | Bambang Soesatyo |
| 13 | | Hidayat Nur Wahid | 3 October 2019 | 1 October 2024 | PKS | | Bambang Soesatyo |
| 13 | | Syarief Hasan | 3 October 2019 | 1 October 2024 | Democratic Party | | Bambang Soesatyo |
| 13 | | Zulkifli Hasan | 3 October 2019 | 15 June 2022 | PAN | | Bambang Soesatyo |
| 13 | | Yandri Susanto | 30 June 2022 | 1 October 2024 | PAN | | Bambang Soesatyo |
| 13 | | Arsul Sani | 3 October 2019 | 18 January 2024 | PPP | | Bambang Soesatyo |
| 13 | | Amir Uskara | 8 March 2024 | 24 September 2024 | PPP | | Bambang Soesatyo |
| 13 | | Fadel Muhammad | 3 October 2019 | 1 October 2024 | Regional Representative Council | | Bambang Soesatyo |
Period 2024–2029
| 14 | | Bambang Wuryanto | 3 October 2024 | Incumbent | PDI-P | | Ahmad Muzani |
| 14 | | Kahar Muzakir | 3 October 2024 | Incumbent | Golkar | | Ahmad Muzani |
| 14 | | Lestari Moerdijat | 3 October 2024 | Incumbent | Nasdem | | Ahmad Muzani |
| 14 | | Rusdi Kirana | 3 October 2024 | Incumbent | PKB | | Ahmad Muzani |
| 14 | | Hidayat Nur Wahid | 3 October 2024 | 10 November 2026 | PKS | | Ahmad Muzani |
| 14 | | Sohibul Iman | 16 November 2026 | Incumbent | PKS | | Ahmad Muzani |
| 14 | | Eddy Soeparno | 3 October 2024 | Incumbent | PAN | | Ahmad Muzani |
| 14 | | Edhie Baskoro Yudhoyono | 3 October 2024 | Incumbent | Democratic Party | | Ahmad Muzani |
| 14 | | Abcandra Akbar Supratman | 3 October 2024 | Incumbent | Regional Representative Council | | Ahmad Muzani |

== See also ==
- People's Consultative Assembly
- List of speakers of the People's Consultative Assembly
