= Hidayat Nur Wahid =

Indonesian politician

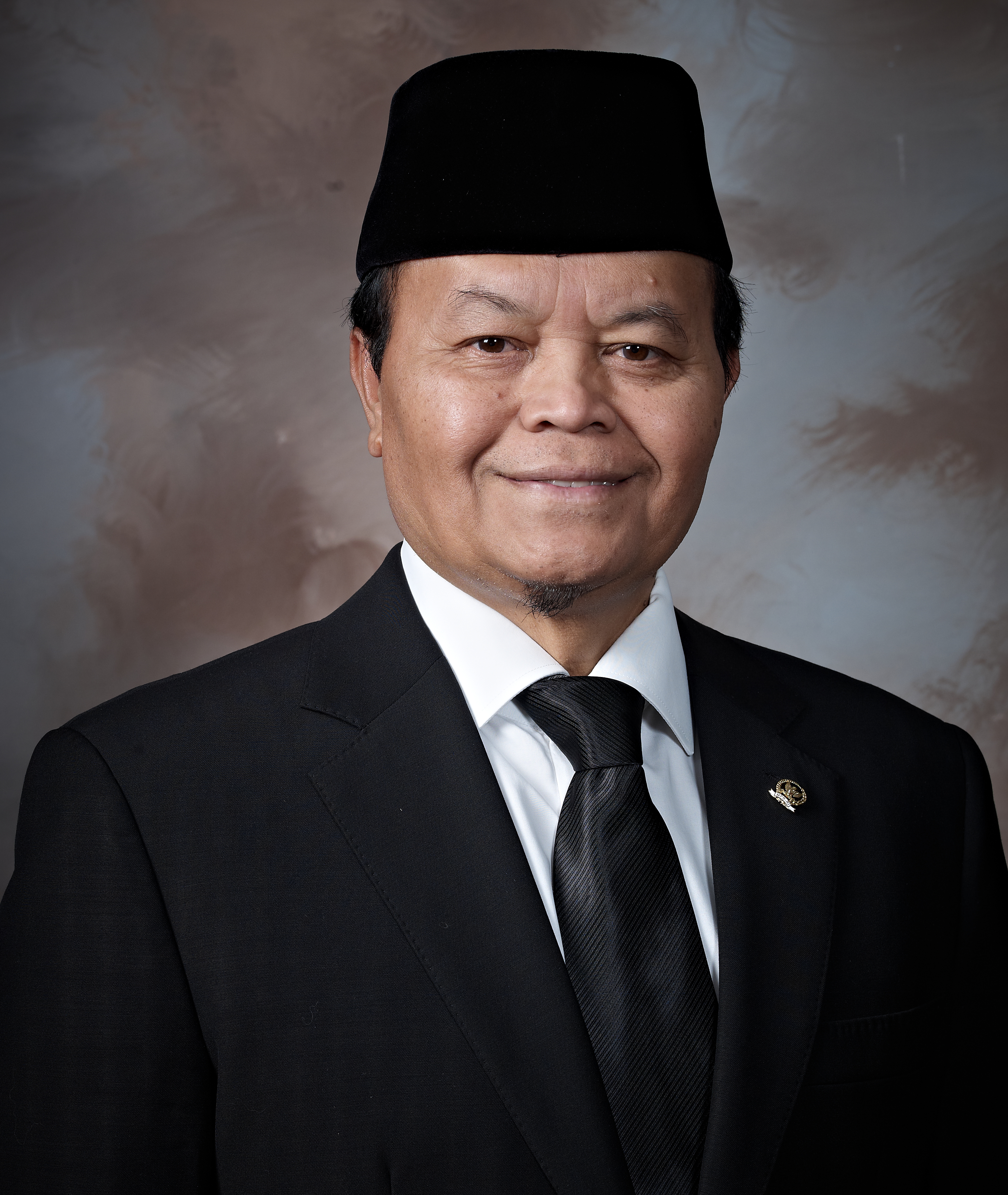

Deputy Speaker of the People's Consultative Assembly
- In office 8 October 2014 – 10 November 2026 Serving with 9 other people

11th Speaker of the People's Consultative Assembly
- In office 1 October 2004 – 1 October 2009
- President: Megawati Soekarnoputri; Susilo Bambang Yudhoyono
- Preceded by: Amien Rais
- Succeeded by: Taufiq Kiemas

3rd President of Prosperous Justice Party
- In office 21 May 2000 – 11 October 2004
- Preceded by: Nur Mahmudi Ismail
- Succeeded by: Tifatul Sembiring

Member of House of Representatives
- Incumbent
- Assumed office 1 October 2004
- Constituency: Jakarta II (2004–2009, 2014– ) Central Java V (2009–2014)

Personal details
- Born: 8 April 1960 (age 66) Klaten, Indonesia
- Party: PKS
- Spouse(s): Kastrian Indriawati Diana Abbas Thalib (m. 2008)
- Children: 6
- Parents: H. Muhammad Syukri (father); Siti Rahayu (mother)
- Education: Sunan Kalijaga State Islamic University; Islamic University of Madinah
- Occupation: Politician

Hidayat Nur Wahid (born 8 April 1960 in Klaten, Central Java) is an Indonesian politician who has been a member of the House of Representatives since 2004. He was the Speaker of Indonesia People's Consultative Assembly (Majelis Permusyawaratan Rakyat/MPR) for the 2004–2009 period. He resigned as the leader of Prosperous Justice Party (Partai Keadilan Sejahtera/PKS) on 11 October 2004. Hidayat was mentioned in the media as a possible running mate for Susilo Bambang Yudhoyono in the 2009 Indonesian presidential election.

== Personal life ==
Born into a family of religious leaders and teachers, Hidayat's maternal grandfather was affiliated with the Muhammadiyah community organization, while his father, H. Muhammad Syukri, a teacher who graduated from IKIP Yogyakarta, also served on the organization's board. Siti Rahayu, Hidayat's mother, was an activist at Aisyiyah, Muhammadiyah's women's wing, and a kindergarten teacher.

Hidayat is the eldest of seven siblings. His other siblings are Muhammad Agung Nugroho, Mabrur Dewantoro, Istiqomah, Ahmad Wiladi, Ahmad Wisanggeni, and Sapti Swastanti. Ahmad Wisanggeni and his wife, Nurus Baiti, have lived in Banda Aceh since 1997 and died in the earthquake and tsunami that struck the city in late December 2004.

From his marriage to Kastrian Indriawati, Hidayat was blessed with four children: Inayatu Dzil Izzati, Ruzaina, Alla Khairi, and Hubaib Shidiqi. His first wife died on 22 January 2008 in Yogyakarta.

Hidayat then marries Diana Abbas Thalib, a doctor. The marriage took place in Taman Mini Indonesia Indah with President Susilo Bambang Yudhoyono acted as their witness on behalf of Hidayat while Vice President Jusuf Kalla acted as witness on behalf of Diana. Diana gave birth to twins in Jakarta on 15 April 2009.

== Honours ==
- Star of Mahaputera, 2nd Class (Bintang Mahaputera Adipradana) - (August 2009)

Preceded by Amien Rais	Speaker of Indonesia People's Consultative Assembly; 2004–2009	Succeeded by Taufiq Kiemas
Preceded by Nur Mahmudi Ismail	Chairman of Prosperous Justice Party; 2000–2004	Succeeded by Tifatul Sembiring
