= Edhie Yudhoyono =

Indonesian politician (born 1980)

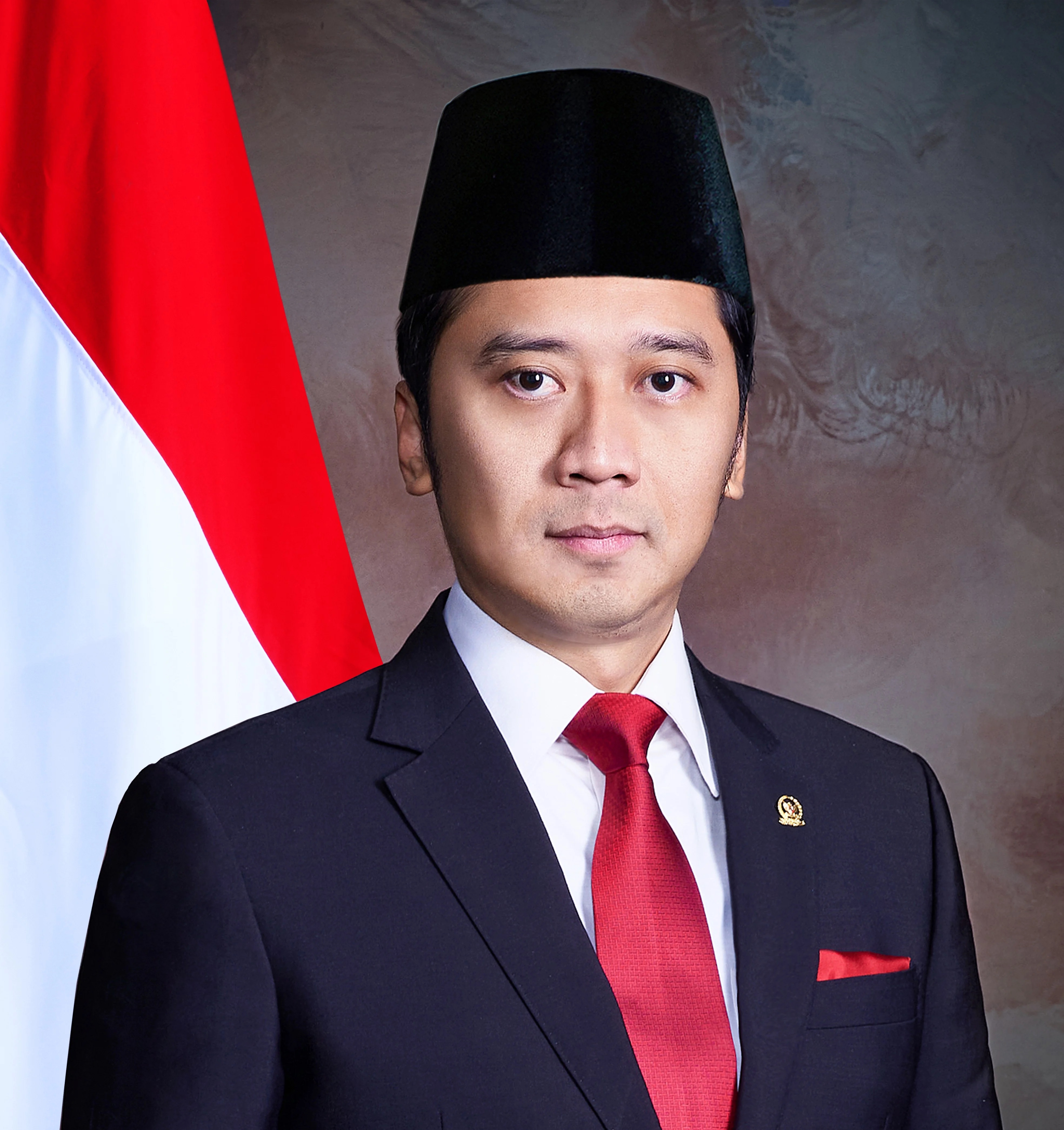
- Official portrait, 2024

Deputy Speaker of the People's Consultative Assembly
- Incumbent
- Assumed office 3 October 2024 Serving with 7 other people
- Speaker: Ahmad Muzani

Member of the House of Representatives
- Incumbent
- Assumed office 1 October 2009
- Constituency: East Java VII

Secretary-General of Democratic Party
- In office 2010–2015
- Chairman: Anas Urbaningrum; Susilo Bambang Yudhoyono
- Succeeded by: Hinca Panjaitan

Personal details
- Born: Edhie Baskoro Yudhoyono; 24 November 1980 (age 45) Bandung, Indonesia
- Party: Demokrat
- Spouse: Siti Ruby Aliya Rajasa (m. 2011)
- Children: 4
- Parents: Susilo Bambang Yudhoyono (father); Ani Yudhoyono (mother)
- Relatives: Agus Harimurti Yudhoyono (older brother); Hatta Rajasa (father-in-law)
- Education: Curtin University (BCom); Nanyang Technology University (MSc); Bogor Agricultural University (PhD)
- Occupation: Politician
- Nickname: Ibas

Edhie Baskoro Yudhoyono (born 24 November 1980), commonly referred to as Ibas, is a politician and member of House of Representatives, Indonesia. Edhie is the second son of the 6th President of the Republic of Indonesia, Susilo Bambang Yudhoyono and the younger brother of Agus Harimurti Yudhoyono.

== Early life and education ==
Edhie obtained his Bachelor of Commerce in Finance and Commerce in 2005 at Curtin University, Perth, Australia. He then continued his studies at Rajaratnam School of International Studies, Nanyang Technological University, Singapore. In 2007, Edhie obtained his Master of Science degree in International Political Economy. He graduated with a dissertation titled "Revitalization of Indonesia's Economy: Attempts to Solve the Twin-Critical-Economic Problems and to Build the Foundation for Future Economic Development".

== Political career ==
His career in politics began as the Regional Coordinator (Korwil) Democratic Party (Indonesia) for the DKI Jakarta and East Java.

In 2009, Edhie was involved in Indonesian politics by nominating himself as a member of the People's Consultative Assembly from the electoral district of East Java VII, representing five regions: Pacitan, Ponorogo, Trenggalek, Magetan, and Ngawi. He was elected as a member of the House of Representatives in April 2009 with the highest vote in Indonesia: 327,097 votes. As a member of the House of Representatives, he was appointed as a member of Budget Board and Commission I of the House of Representatives in charge of foreign relations, defense, and information and communication.

Currently he is active as a Democratic Party (Indonesia) politician, the party that won the general election in 2009. His career in the Democratic Party began with his appointment as Chairman of the Department of Cadreization. After the 2nd Congress of the Democratic Party in May 2010, he was appointed as Secretary-General to assist Democrat chairman Anas Urbaningrum. The appointment made him the secretary-general of the youngest political party in Indonesia. He was also the vice chairman of the Indonesian Chamber of Commerce and Industry (Kadin) for International Promotion, Tourism, Cultural Arts, and Sports between 2010 and 2015.

In May 2010, after the PD Congress produced elected chairperson, he was appointed Secretary-General of the Democratic Party from 2010–2015 to accompany the elected general chairman to run the party organization. On that position, Edhie became secretary general of the growing party in Indonesia assigned to run the largest party organization election results in 2009 in guarding the government of Susilo Bambang Yudhoyono.

== Personal life ==
On 24 November 2011, he married Siti Ruby Aliya Rajasa at Cipanas Palace. Aliya is the daughter of Hatta Rajasa, Coordinating Minister for Economic Affairs. Together, they have two sons and two daughters: Airlangga Satriadhi, Pancasakti Maharajasa, Gayatri Idalia, and Alisha Prameswari.
