= Rusdi Kirana =

Indonesian businessperson and politician (b. 1963)

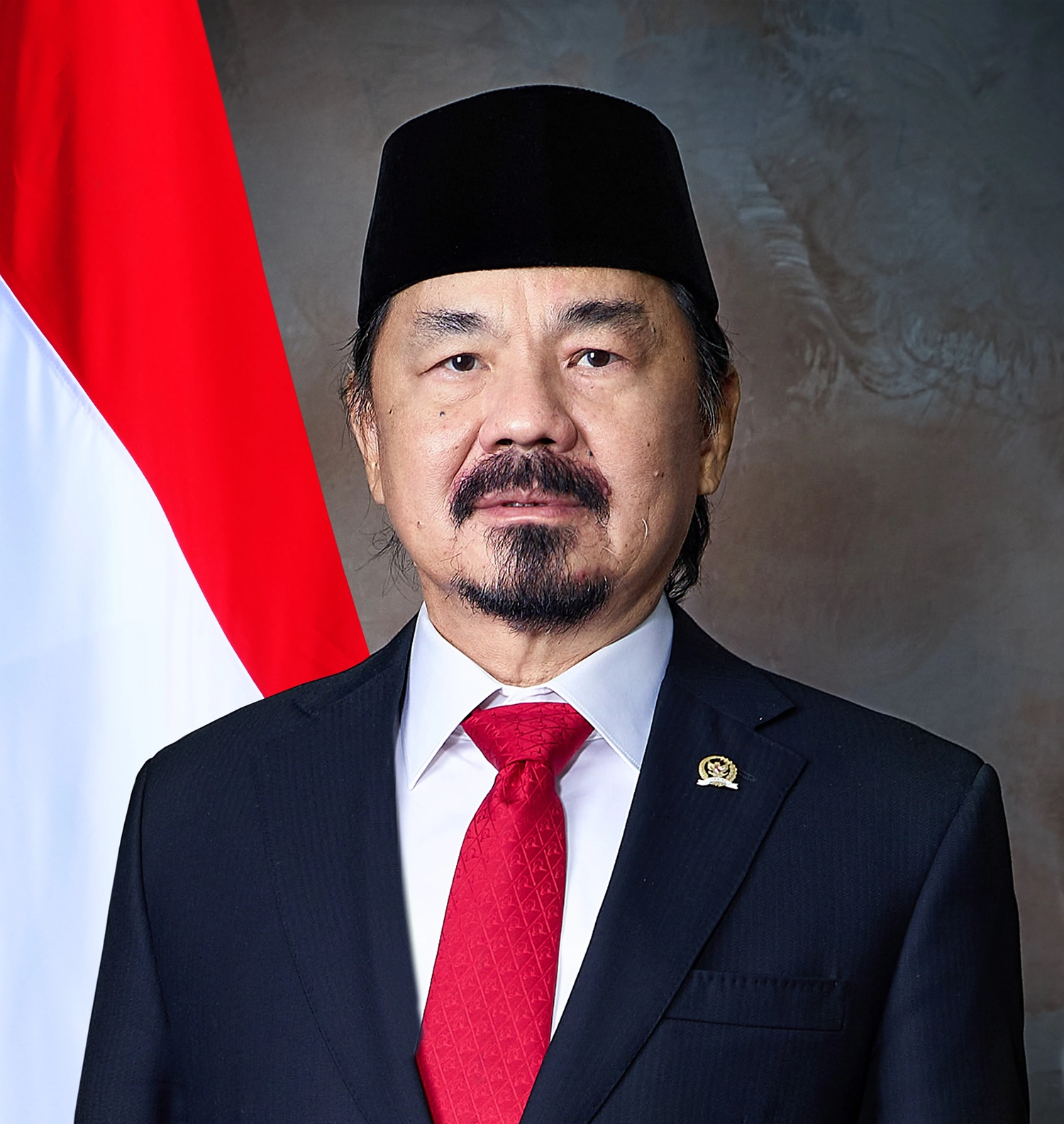
- Official portrait, 2024

Deputy Speaker of the People's Consultative Assembly of the Republic of Indonesia
- Incumbent
- Assumed office 3 October 2024 Serving with Period 2024–29: Abcandra Akbar Supratman; Bambang Wuryanto; Kahar Muzakir; Lestari Moerdijat; Hidayat Nur Wahid; Eddy Soeparno; Edhie Baskoro Yudhoyono
- Speaker: Ahmad Muzani
- Preceded by: Period 2019–24: Ahmad Basarah; Ahmad Muzani; Lestari Moerdijat; Hidayat Nur Wahid; Jazilul Fawaid; Zulkifli Hasan; Syarief Hasan; Arsul Sani

Member of the House of Representatives of the Republic of Indonesia
- Incumbent
- Assumed office 1 October 2024
- Other positions: Member of Commission III (since 2024)
- Vote count: 121,080 votes (2024)
- Parliamentary group: National Awakening Party faction
- Constituency: East Java VIII

17th Ambassador of Indonesia to Malaysia
- In office 18 May 2017 – 14 September 2020
- President: Joko Widodo
- Preceded by: Herman Prayitno
- Succeeded by: Hermono

Member of the Presidential Advisory Council
- In office 19 January 2015 – 7 June 2017 Serving with Sidarto Danusubroto; Muhammad Yusuf Kartanegara; Ahmad Hasyim Muzadi; Suharso Monoarfa; Jan Darmadi; Abdul Malik Fadjar; Subagyo Hadi Siswoyo
- President: Joko Widodo
- Chairman of the Council: Sri Adiningsih
- Succeeded by: Yahya Cholil Staquf

CEO of Lion Air Group
- In office 19 October 1999 – 19 January 2015

Personal details
- Born: 17 August 1963 (age 63) Cirebon, West Java, Indonesia
- Party: National Awakening Party
- Spouse: Iesien Rusdi Kirana
- Children: 3, including Davin Kirana
- Education: Pancasila University; Faculty of Economics
- Occupation: Businessman; Politician
- Known for: Founder of Lion Air

Rusdi Kirana (born 17 August 1963) is an Indonesian businessman and politician. He is the founder of Lion Air Group, which introduced budget no-frills airline services to Indonesia. He currently serves as the Deputy Speaker of the People's Consultative Assembly of the Republic of Indonesia (MPR RI) for the period 2024–2029. On 19 January 2015, he was appointed by President Joko Widodo to the Presidential Advisory Council. In the political field, since 12 January 2014, he has served as the Deputy Chairperson of the National Awakening Party. The Lion Air Group, under his leadership, oversees several subsidiaries, including Lion Air, Wings Air, Batik Air, Malindo Air, Thai Lion Air, and Super Air Jet.

== Biography ==
Rusdi started his aviation business in October 1999. With an initial capital of US$10 million, he initiated the "revolution" in the world of aviation with a low cost carrier concept. The breakthrough was causing trouble for other airlines. In just six years, Lion had 24 aircraft consisting of 19 MD-80 and five DHC-8-301 aircraft. In terms of passenger numbers, Lion won over 600,000 people per month or controlled 40% of all market segments. In 2004 Lion Air took second place in number of passengers transported, behind Garuda Indonesia. He continues to develop Lion Air's businesses and intends to become a market leader in domestic flights. So he continued to prepare for the start of infrastructure, flight routes, to increase the number of aircraft.

For infrastructure, Rusdi cooperated with the TNI AU and PT Dirgantara Indonesia, hiring a hangar at Husein Sastranegara International Airport, Bandung to use as a maintenance facility for Lion Air. He also bought a used airplane simulator from Scandinavian Airlines to train his pilots. In addition, Lion Air cooperates with the Indonesian Air Force to become the manager of Halim Perdanakusuma International Airport, Jakarta. It is likely that Lion Air's will switch its base to that airport.

Worth US$835 million with his brother in 2019.

== Political career ==
Rusdi Kirana became active in politics after stepping down from his business leadership role in Lion Air Group. He started to be active in politics in 2013 and joined the National Awakening Party (PKB) as early as January 2014, becoming the party's vice chairman. He was one of the candidates for Minister of Transportation during Joko Widodo's first term. However, Rusdi Kirana prefers to be an ambassador instead of a minister, citing the potential of conflict of interest as Rusdi Kirana still owns shares of Lion Air. He was nominated by PKB to be a part of the Presidential Advisory Council and on January 19, 2015, he was sworn in as a member in the council.

On November 16, 2015, Rusdi Kirana issued a warning against Minister of Transportation Ignasius Jonan for alleged defamation related to the proposal to build Lebak Airport, Banten after Jonan made a comment against him, accusing him for wanting to close the Curug Indonesian Aviation Polytechnic in order to build the airport. Rusdi Kirana made the warning saying that the accusation was personal and he won't be issuing it if Jonan's comment doesn't slight him on personal level. On the next day, Jonan apologised and retracted his statements. Rusdi and Lion Air's lobbying on Lebak Airport's construction ends up being cancelled as the plans did not meet the government's requirements.

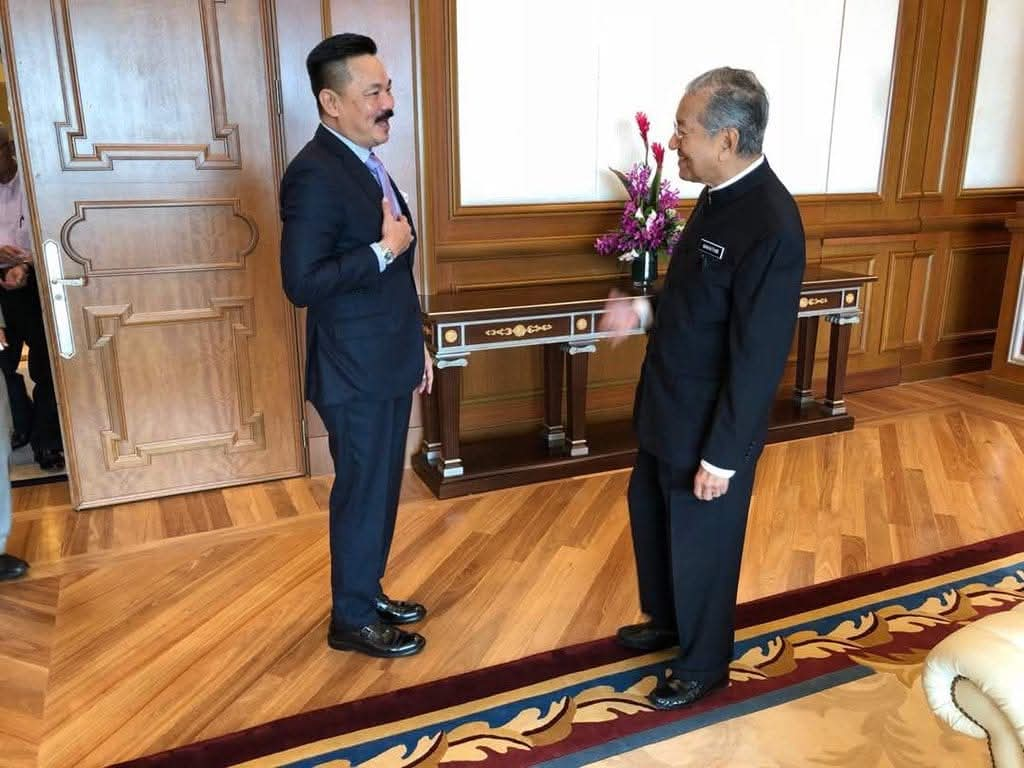
Rusdi met with Malaysian Prime Minister Mahathir Mohamad in June 2018

In 2017, Rusdi was appointed as Indonesia's Ambassador to Malaysia. He have served his position until 9 July 2020. As he served as Indonesia's Ambassador to Malaysia, he had withdrawn his membership from PKB for the sake of duty for the country.

Rusdi then ran as member of House of Representatives for East Java VIII electoral district during the 2024 general election. This district covers the regencies of Jombang, Madiun, Mojokerto, and Nganjuk as well as the cities of Madiun and Mojokerto. He ran together with the younger brother of Muhaimin Iskandar, Minister of Villages, Development of Disadvantaged Regions, and Transmigration Abdul Halim Iskandar in the electoral district. According to the General Elections Commission, both he and Abdul Halim Iskandar managed to secure their memberships in the House of Representatives, with Rusdi having the higher vote count of 121.080 compared to Abdul Halim's 107.011. In September 2024, he was re-appointed as deputy chairman of the party by Muhaimin Iskandar.

On 4 October 2024, he was nominated by PKB to serve as Deputy Speaker of the People's Consultative Assembly. He then got sworn in as one of the Deputy Speakers of the People's Consultative Assembly, serving under Ahmad Muzani. He later announced his retirement from Lion Air, citing his new responsibilities as a member of parliament and as a deputy speaker. As a Deputy Speaker, he wish to focus on economic issues, particularly in small and medium-sized enterprises.

Diplomatic department
Preceded by: Herman Prayitno	Indonesian Ambassador to Malaysia 2017–2020	Succeeded by: Hermono
