= Ahmad Basarah =

Indonesian politician

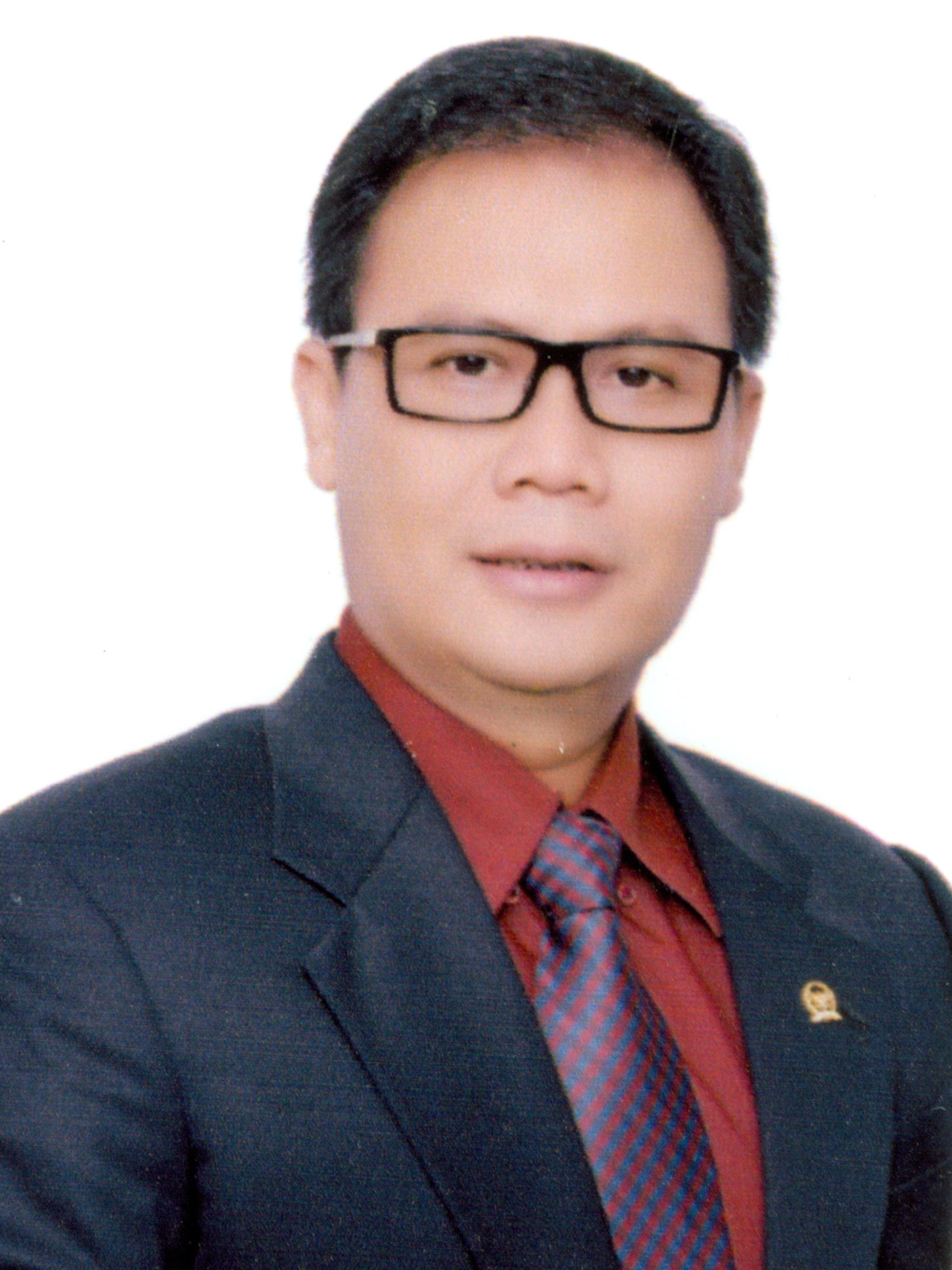
- Born: 16 June 1968; Jakarta
- Alma mater: SD Negeri Pulogadung 2 Petang; SMPN 168 Jakarta; SMA Negeri 36 Jakarta; Institute of Social and Political Science Jakarta; Universitas 17 Agustus 1945 Jakarta; University of Indonesia; Christian University of Indonesia; Diponegoro University
- Occupation: Politician
- Political party: Indonesian Democratic Party of Struggle
- Position held: Member of the People's Representative Council of Indonesia (2019–2024), Member of the People's Representative Council of Indonesia (2014–2019), Member of Indonesia's Regional Representative Council (2009–2014)

Ahmad Basarah is an Indonesian politician and currently member of the People's Representative Council.

In the 2019 General Election, he got elected for the fourth time by the electoral district of East Java V. He is known as a close ally to Puan Maharani and as the deputy chairman of the People's Consultative Assembly, he is known by his ambitions to implement the Pancasila as the state ideology of Indonesia.

He was reelected for a fifth term in 2024 with 89,769 votes.
