= Eddy Soeparno =

Indonesian politician and businessman

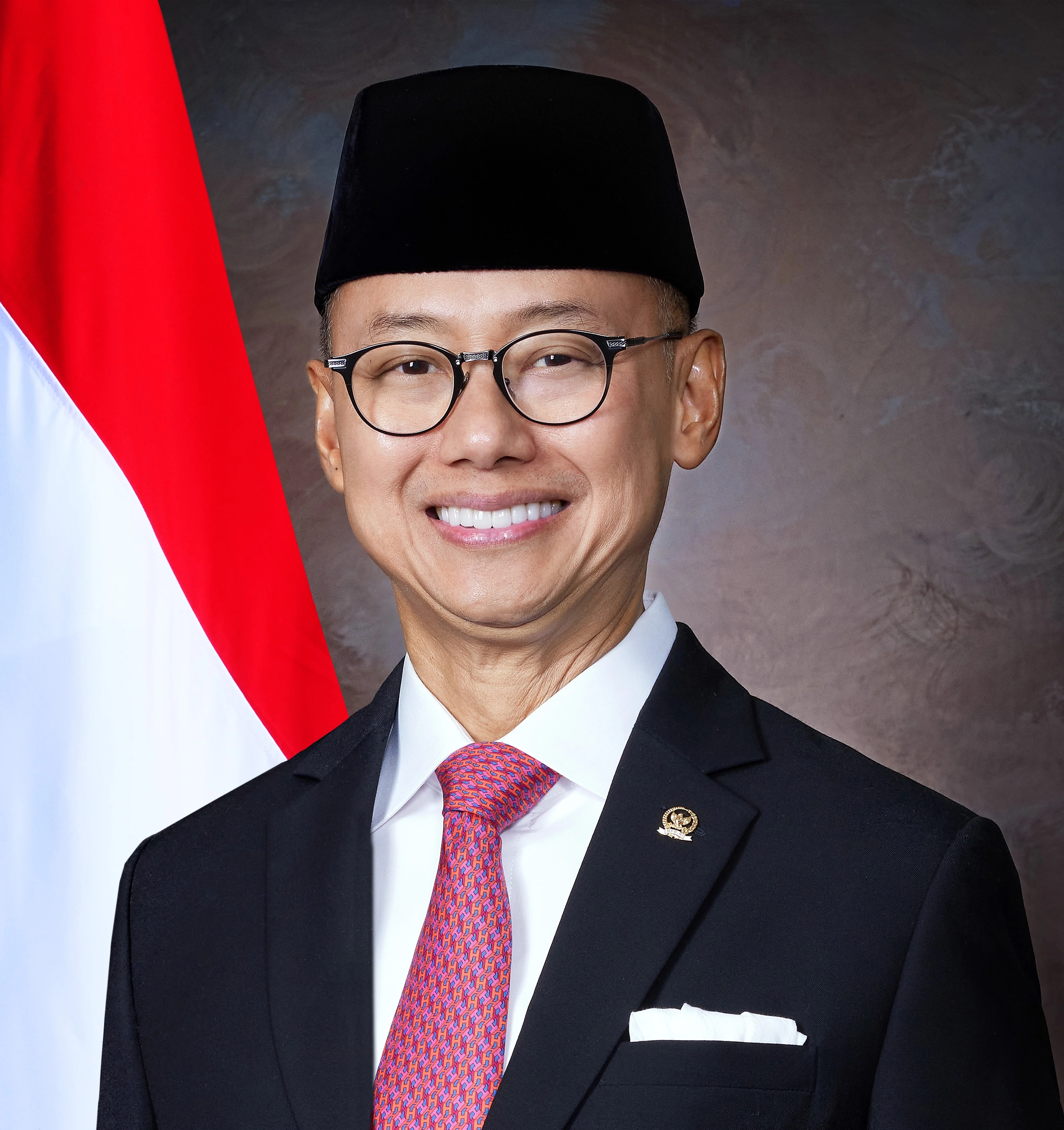
- Official portrait, 2024

Deputy Speaker of the People's Consultative Assembly of the Republic of Indonesia
- Incumbent
- Assumed office 3 October 2024 Serving with Period 2024–29: Abcandra Akbar Supratman; Bambang Wuryanto; Kahar Muzakir; Lestari Moerdijat; Hidayat Nur Wahid; Rusdi Kirana; Edhie Baskoro Yudhoyono
- Speaker: Ahmad Muzani
- Preceded by: Period 2019–24: Ahmad Basarah; Ahmad Muzani; Lestari Moerdijat; Hidayat Nur Wahid; Jazilul Fawaid; Zulkifli Hasan; Syarief Hasan; Arsul Sani

Member of the House of Representatives of the Republic of Indonesia
- Incumbent
- Assumed office 1 October 2024
- Other positions: Member of Commission XII (since 2024)
- Vote count: 66,703 votes (2024)
- Parliamentary group: National Mandate Party faction
- Constituency: West Java III

Personal details
- Born: Mohammad Eddy Dwiyanto Soeparno; 6 May 1965 (age 61) Jakarta, Indonesia
- Citizenship: Indonesian
- Party: National Mandate Party
- Relations: Siti Masitha Soeparno (sister)
- Parent: Moehamad Soeparno (father)

Eddy Soeparno (born 6 May 1965) is an Indonesian politician and businessman. He's currently the secretary general of the National Mandate Party. Soeparno was formerly the director of finance at the Bakrie Group subsidiary Bakrie & Brothers.
