= Lestari Moerdijat =

Indonesian politician (born 1967)

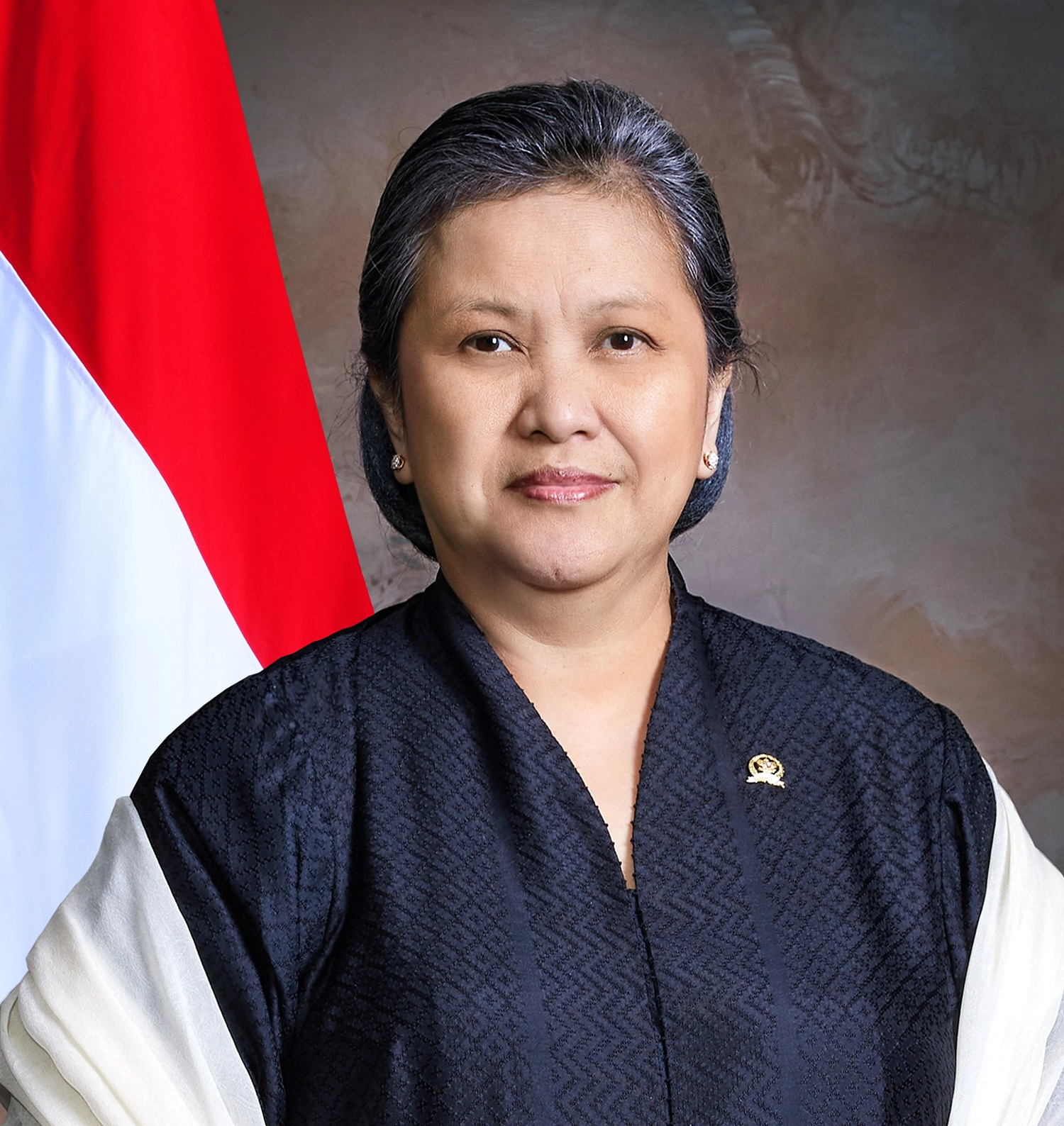
Official portrait, 2024.

Lestari Moerdijat who is also known as Mbak Rerie (born 30 November 1967) is an Indonesian politician of Javanese descent, who has served as Deputy Speaker of the People's Consultative Assembly of Indonesia since 3 October 2019.

She endorsed Anies Baswedan in the 2024 Indonesian presidential election.
