= Ahmad Muzani =

Speaker of People's Consultative Assembly of the Republic of Indonesia

The Right Honourable Datok Seri Diwangsa Wira Perdana Ahmad Muzani
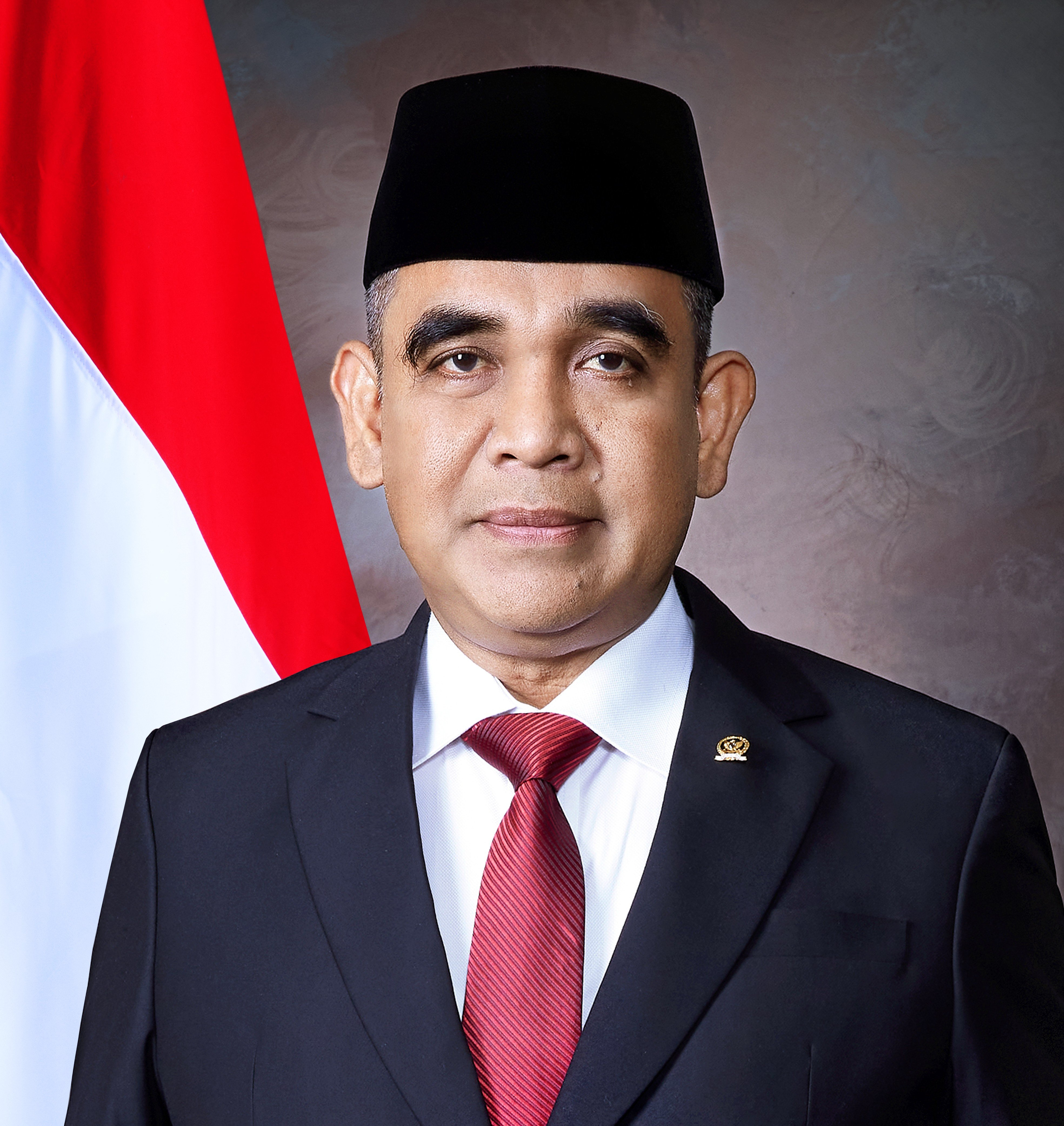
- Official portrait, 2024

16th Speaker of the People's Consultative Assembly
- Incumbent
- Assumed office 3 October 2024
- Preceded by: Bambang Soesatyo

Deputy Speaker of the People's Consultative Assembly
- In office 28 March 2018 – 3 October 2024
- Preceded by: Dimyati Natakusumah
- Succeeded by: Kahar Muzakir

1st Secretary-General of Gerindra
- In office 6 October 2008 – 1 August 2025
- Leader: Prabowo Subianto; Suhardi
- Preceded by: Office established
- Succeeded by: Sugiono

Member of House of Representatives
- Incumbent
- Assumed office 1 October 2009
- Constituency: Lampung I
- Majority: 24.723 (2009); 48.379 (2014); 61.995 (2019); 110.161 (2024)

Personal details
- Born: 19 July 1968 (age 58) Tegal, Indonesia
- Party: Gerindra Party
- Spouse: Himmatul Aliyah
- Occupation: Politician; teacher; journalist

Ahmad Muzani (born 15 July 1968) is an entrepreneur and politician from the Great Indonesia Movement Party. He is the Secretary General of the Great Indonesia Movement Party and a member of the House of Representatives (Indonesia).

== Early life and education ==
Since he was a teenager he has been in various organizations in his hometown. He has also been noted to lead the Indonesian Islamic Students (PII), before continuing his education majoring in Communication studies at the Universitas Ibnu Chaldun, Jakarta.

== Political career ==
=== Reform Star Party ===
His political career began under the Star Reform Party (PBR) formed by Zainuddin M.Z, during which Muzani served as Deputy Secretary General. But ahead of the 2009 elections, Muzani who once worked as a manager of an oil palm plantation owned by Prabowo Subianto was thrusting towards Great Indonesia Movement Party.

=== Member of Parliament ===
He then nominated himself as a member of the legislative electoral district of Lampung I which includes Bandar Lampung, West Lampung, South Lampung, Tanggamus, Pesawaran, and Metro. After elections he was announced as the winner representing Senayan from 2009 to 2014 after reaching 24,723 votes. Muzani was sworn into the Commission I in charge of Defense, Foreign Affairs, and Information.

In 2014, he was re-elected as a member of the House of Representatives and was appointed chairman of the faction of Great Indonesia Movement Party in the House of Representatives.

== Honours ==
- Star of the Republic of Indonesia, 3rd Class (Indonesian: Bintang Republik Indonesia Utama) (25 August 2025)
- Star of Mahaputera, 5th Class (Indonesian: Bintang Mahaputera Nararya)(14 August 2024)
- Star of Service, 1st Class (Indonesian: Bintang Jasa Utama) (13 August 2020)
