= 2024 Bogor mayoral election =

- 27 November 2024
- Turnout: 64.30%
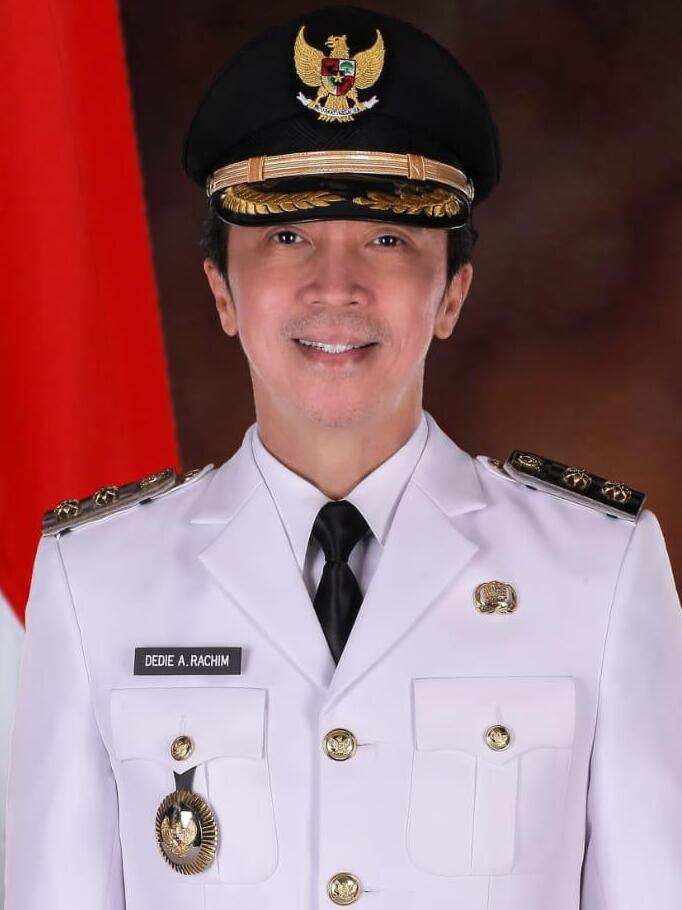

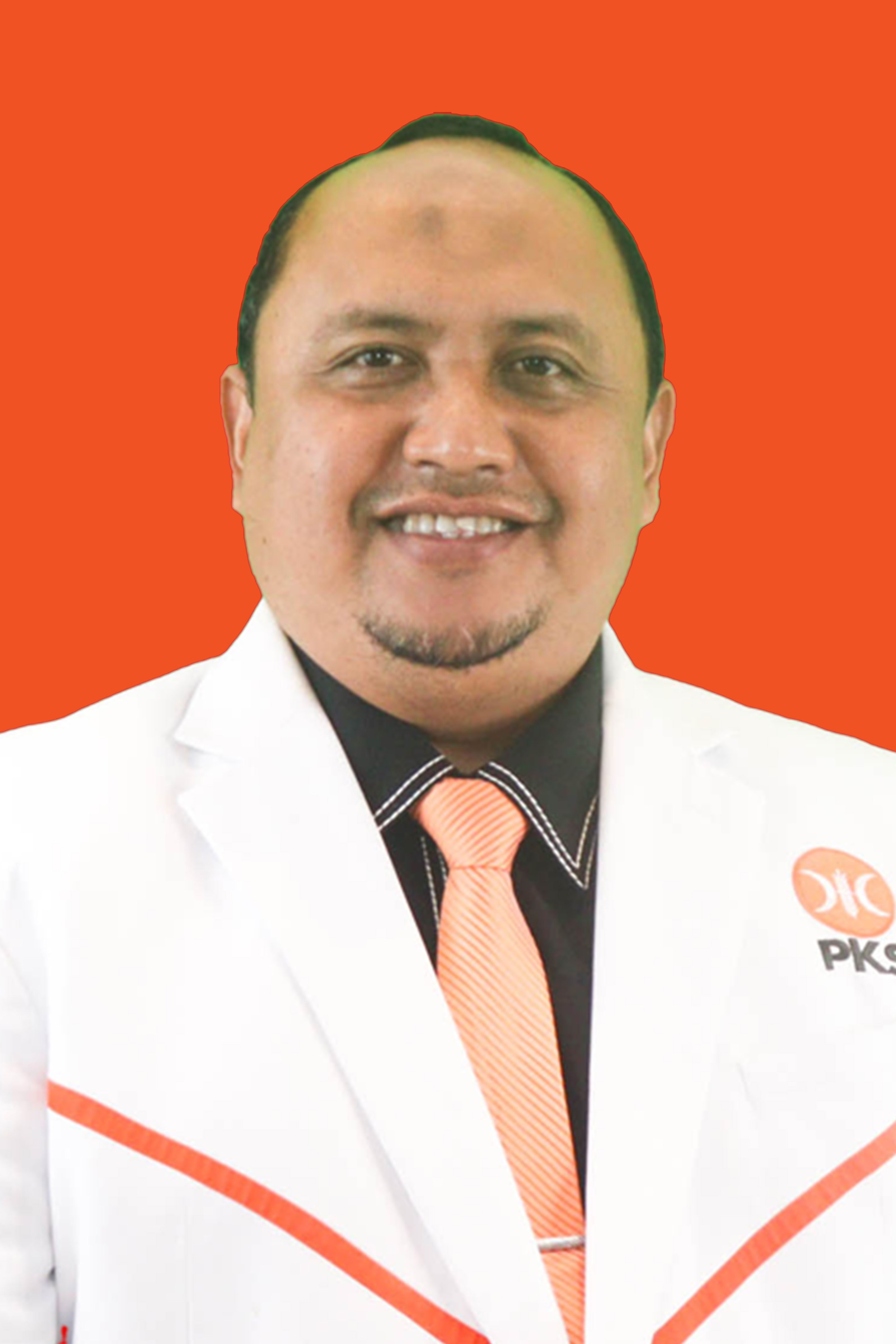

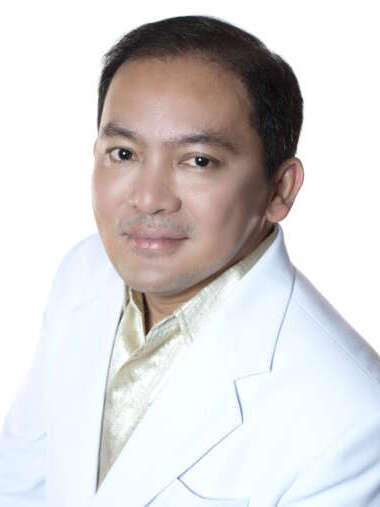

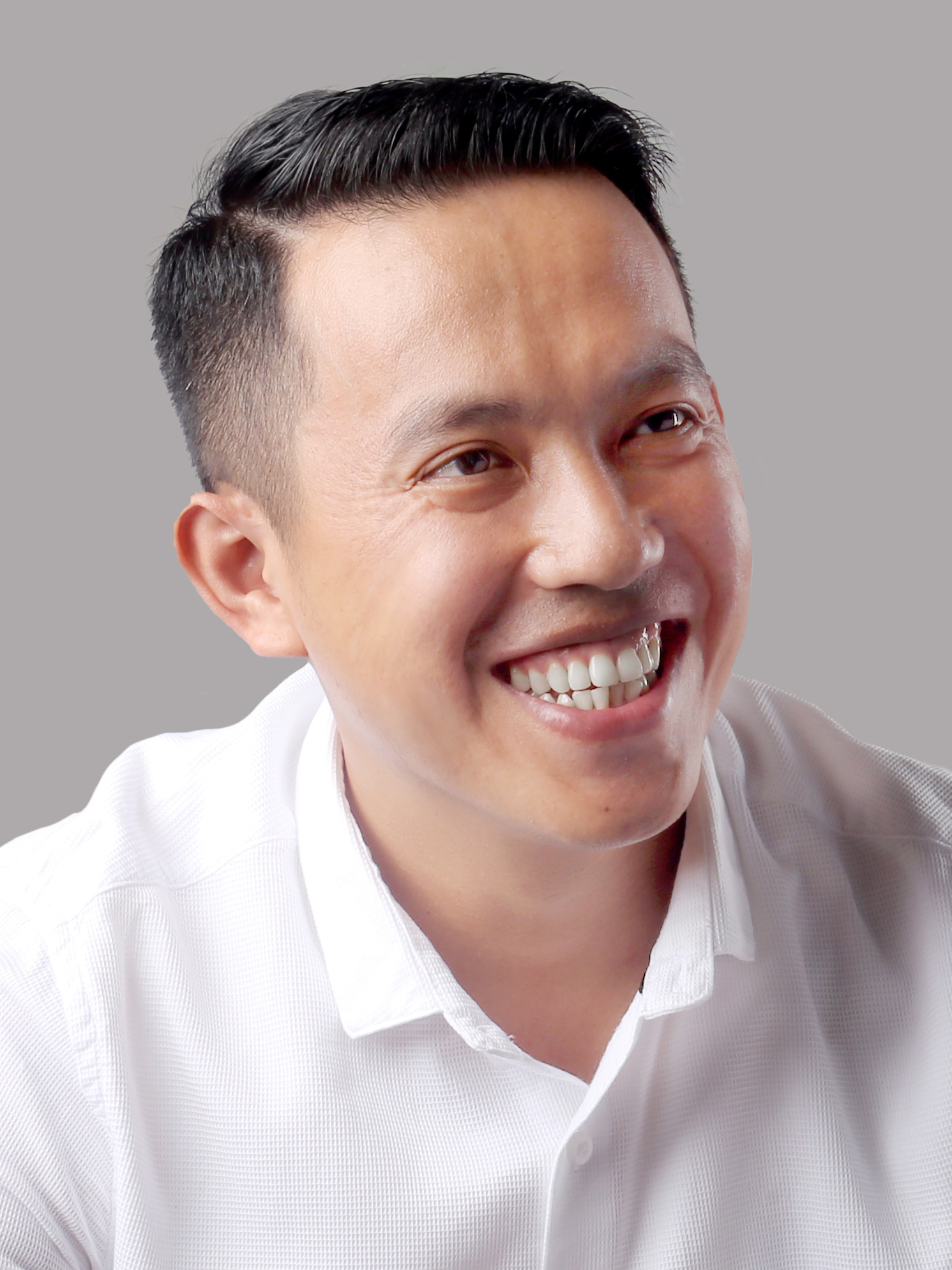
Candidate	Dedie Rachim	Atang Trisnanto	Raendi Rayendra
Party	PAN	PKS	PKB
Running mate	Jenal Mutaqin	Annida Allivia	Eka Maulana
Popular vote	183,500	136,961	71,736
Percentage	36.79%	27.46%	14.38%
Candidate	Rena Da Frina	Sendi Fardiansyah
Party	PDI-P	Golkar
Running mate	Teddy Risandi	Melli Darsa
Popular vote	58,415	48,175
Percentage	11.71%	9.66%
- Results by district and subdistrict (Interactive version)
Mayor before election
Hery Antasari (acting)
Independent
Elected mayor
Dedie Rachim
PAN

The 2024 Bogor mayoral election was held on 27 November 2024 as part of nationwide local elections to elect the mayor and vice mayor of Bogor for a five-year term. The previous election was held in 2018. Former Vice Mayor Dedie Rachim of the National Mandate Party (PAN) won the election, securing 36% of the vote. Former Speaker of the Bogor Regional House of Representatives Atang Trisnanto of the Prosperous Justice Party (PKS) placed second with 27%.

== Electoral system ==
The election, like other local elections in 2024, follow the first-past-the-post system where the candidate with the most votes wins the election, even if they do not win a majority. It is possible for a candidate to run uncontested, in which case the candidate is still required to win a majority of votes "against" an "empty box" option. Should the candidate fail to do so, the election will be repeated on a later date.

== Candidates ==
According to electoral regulations, in order to qualify for the election, candidates were required to secure support from a political party or a coalition of parties controlling 10 seats (20 percent of all seats) in the Bogor City Regional House of Representatives (DPRD). The Prosperous Justice Party, which won 11 seats in the 2024 legislative election, is the only party eligible to nominate a mayoral candidate without forming a coalition with other parties. Candidates may alternatively demonstrate support to run as an independent in form of photocopies of identity cards, which in Bogor's case corresponds to 60,014 copies. According to the General Elections Commission (KPU), one candidate consulted with the KPU, but did not end up registering before the set deadline.

The previous mayor, Bima Arya Sugiarto, had served two full terms and was ineligible to run in the election.

=== Declared ===
These are candidates who have been allegedly delegated by political parties endorsing for mayoral election:

1
Candidate from Independent
Sendi Fardiansyah	Melli Darsa
for Mayor	for Vice Mayor
Personal Secretary to the First Lady of Indonesia Iriana	Lawyer and politician
Parties
12 / 50 (24%) Golkar (7 seats); NasDem (4 seats); PSI (1 seat)

2
Candidate from PKS
Atang Trisnanto	Annida Allivia
for Mayor	for Vice Mayor
Speaker of the Bogor Regional House of Representatives (2019–2024)	Senatorial candidate for West Java in 2024
Parties
11 / 50 (22%) PKS (11 seats)

3
Candidate from PAN and Gerindra
Dedie Rachim	Jenal Mutaqin
for Mayor	for Vice Mayor
Vice Mayor of Bogor (2019–2024)	Deputy Speaker of the Bogor Regional House of Representatives (2019–2024)
Parties
14 / 50 (28%) Gerindra (6 seats); PAN (5 seats); Demokrat (3 seats)

4
Candidate from Independent
Rena Da Frina	Teddy Risandi
for Mayor	for Vice Mayor
Head of Public Works and Spatial Planning Department of Bogor City	Politician
Parties
6 / 50 (12%) PDI-P (6 seats)

5
Candidate from Independent
Raendi Rayendra	Eka Maulana
for Mayor	for Vice Mayor
Doctor and lecturer, activist of Healthy Bogor Movement	Public figure
Parties
7 / 50 (14%) PKB (4 seats); PPP (3 seats)

=== Potential ===
The following are individuals who have either been publicly mentioned as a potential candidate by a political party in the DPRD, publicly declared their candidacy with press coverage, or considered as a potential candidate by media outlets:

- Dedie Rachim (PAN), previous vice mayor (2019–2024).
- Sahrul Gunawan (PAN), vice regent of Bandung Regency and former actor.
- Sendi Fardiansyah, personal secretary to First Lady of Indonesia Iriana.

== Political map ==
Following the 2024 Indonesian legislative election, ten political parties are represented in the Bogor DPRD:

Political parties	Seat count
Prosperous Justice Party (PKS)	11 / 50
Party of Functional Groups (Golkar)	7 / 50
Indonesian Democratic Party of Struggle (PDI-P)	6 / 50
Great Indonesia Movement Party (Gerindra)	6 / 50
National Mandate Party (PAN)	5 / 50
NasDem Party	4 / 50
National Awakening Party (PKB)	4 / 50
Democratic Party (Demokrat)	3 / 50
United Development Party (PPP)	3 / 50
Indonesian Solidarity Party (PSI)	1 / 50

== Results ==
Candidate	Running mate	Party	Votes	%
Dedie Rachim	Jenal Mutaqin	National Mandate Party	183,500	36.79
Atang Trisnanto	Annida Allivia	Prosperous Justice Party	136,961	27.46
Raendi Rayendra	Eka Maulana	National Awakening Party	71,736	14.38
Rena Da Frina	Achmad Teddy Risandi	Indonesian Democratic Party of Struggle	58,415	11.71
Sendi Fardiansyah	Melli Darsa	Golkar	48,175	9.66
Total			498,787	100.00
Valid votes			498,787	95.15
Invalid/blank votes			25,438	4.85
Total votes			524,225	100.00
Registered voters/turnout			815,249	64.30
Source: KPU

Candidate vote share by district and subdistrict
Sendi–Melli

Atang–Annida

Eddie–Jenal

Rena–Teddy

Raendi–Eka
