= Mayor of Bogor =

- Wali Kota Bogor
- Coat of arms of Bogor

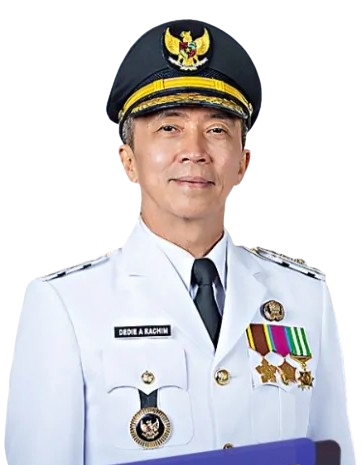
- Incumbent; Dedie Abdu Rachim since 20 February 2025
- Term length: 5 years
- Inaugural holder: A. Bagchus
- Formation: 1920
- Website: kotabogor.go.id

Mayor of Bogor is the head of the second-level region who holds the government in Bogor together with the vice mayor and 50 members of the Bogor City Regional House of Representatives. The mayor and vice mayor of Bogor are elected through general elections held every 5 years. The first mayor of Bogor was A. Bagchus, who governed the city during the Dutch colonisation period from 1920 to 1927.

== List ==
The following is a definitive list of Mayors of Bogor since 1920 during the Dutch East Indies era until now under the Government of the Republic of Indonesia.

Dutch East Indies Period
Num.	Portrait	Mayor	Beginning of office	End of Term	Political Party / Faction	Period	Note.	Vice mayor
1		A. Bagchus	1920	1927	Independent	1		N/A
2		J. M. Wesselink	1927	1931	Independent	2		N/A
3		F. A. J. Middelkoop	1931	1933	Independent	3		N/A
4		A. H. de Jong	1933	1934	Independent	4		N/A
5		G. F. Rambonnet	1934	1935	Independent	5		N/A
6		N. Beets	1935	1937	Independent	6		N/A
7		P. H. M. Hildebrand	1937	1941	Independent	7		N/A
8		Mr. dr. R. Ng. Soebroto	1941	1945	Independent	8		N/A
Mayor of Bogor
Num.	Portrait	Mayor	Beginning of office	End of Term	Political Party / Faction	Period	Note.	Vice mayor
1		R. Odang Prawiradipraja	1945	1946	Independent	9		N/A
2		M. Witjaksono Wirjodihardjo	1947	1948	Independent	10		N/A
3		J.J. Penoch	1948	1950	Independent	11		N/A
4		R. Djoekardi	1950	1952	Independent	12		N/A
5		R.S.A Kartadjoemena	1952	1956	Independent	13		N/A
6		Pramono Notosudiro	1956	1959	Independent	14		N/A
7		R. Abdul Rachman	1960	1961	Independent	15		N/A
8		Achmad Adnawidjaja	1961	1965	Independent	16		N/A
9		Achmad Syam	1965	1979	Independent	17		N/A
9		Achmad Syam	1965	1979	Independent	18		N/A
10		Achmad Sobana; S.H.	1979	1984	Independent	19		N/A
11		Ir. Muhammad	1984	1989	Independent	20		N/A
12		Drs. Suratman	1989	1994	Independent	21		Eddy Gunardi (1992–1994)
13		Eddy Gunardi	7 March 1994	7 March 1999	Independent	22		N/A
14		Iswara Natanegara	1999	2004	Golkar	23	N/A	
15		Diani Budiarto	2004	2009	Independent	24		Mochammad Sahid
15		Diani Budiarto	2009	2014	Independent	25		Achmad Ru'yat
16		Bima Arya Sugiarto	7 April 2014	15 February 2018	PAN	26		Usmar Hariman
—		Usmar Hariman (Acting Officer)	15 February 2018	23 June 2018	Gerindra	26	(Note: Replacing Bima Arya Sugiarto who is on campaign leave to participate in the 2018 Bogor mayoral election.)	N/A
(16)		Bima Arya Sugiarto	23 June 2018	7 April 2019	PAN	26		Usmar Hariman
—		Ade Sarip Hidayat (Daily executive)	8 April 2019	20 April 2019	Independent	-		N/A
(16)		Bima Arya Sugiarto	20 April 2019	20 April 2024	PAN	27		Dedie Abdu Rachim
–		Hery Antasari (Acting)	20 April 2024	20 February 2025	Independent	–		N/A
17		Dedie Abdu Rachim	20 February 2025	Incumbent	PAN	28		Jenal Mutaqin

== See also ==
- Bogor
- List of incumbent regional heads and deputy regional heads in West Java
