= 2018 Papua gubernatorial election =

- 27 June 2018
- Turnout: 84.4%
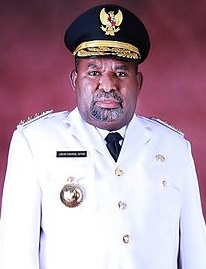

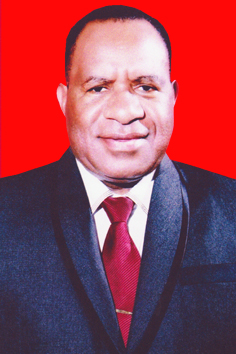
Nominee	Lukas Enembe	John Wempi Wetipo
Party	Demokrat	PDI-P
Running mate	Klemen Tinal	Habel Melkias Suwae
Popular vote	1,939,539	932,008
Percentage	67.54%	32.46%
- Results map by city and regency
Governor before election
Lukas Enembe
Demokrat
Elected Governor
Lukas Enembe
Demokrat

The 2018 Papua gubernatorial election took place in Papua, Indonesia on 27 June 2018 as part of the simultaneous local elections. It was held to elect the governor of Papua along with their deputy, whilst members of the provincial council (Dewan Perwakilan Rakyat Daerah) will be re-elected in 2019.

Incumbent Lukas Enembe ran for his second term against the regent of Jayawijaya Regency John Wempi Wetipo.

== Timeline ==
Registration for party-backed candidates were opened between 8 and 10 January 2018, while independent candidates were required to register between 22 and 26 November 2017 although none registered. The candidates were assigned their ballot numbers on 21 February 2018. The campaigning period would commence between 15 February and 24 June, with a three-day election silence before voting on 27 June.

The General Elections Commission planned to release a list of eligible voters by 22 April 2018, but it was delayed citing delays from several regions. A placeholder count from March 2018 placed the voter count at 3,125,047.

== Candidates ==
As per regulations due to the province's special autonomy status, candidates are required to garner the support of political parties totaling 15 percent of the popular vote in the 2014 election or parties controlling 15 percent of the 55-seat provincial council.

#	Candidate	Position	Running mate	Parties
1	Lukas Enembe	Incumbent governor	Klemen Tinal	Demokrat; Golkar; Hanura; PKB; Nasdem; PKS; PAN; PKPI; PPP; Total: 42 seats
2	John Wempi Wetipo	Regent of Jayawijaya	Habel Melkias Suwae	PDI-P; Gerindra; Perindo, PBB; Total: 13 seats

The Lukas-Klemen pair (abbreviated as Lukmen) are both incumbents. After garnering the support of most political parties in 2017, several media outlets and his party Demokrat speculated that the election will be uncontested. On January 4, however, PDI-P leader Megawati Sukarnoputri declared that the party will place its support behind John Wempi Wetipo, regent of Jayawijaya Regency with former regent of Jayapura Regency Habel Melkias Suwae as his running mate. The John-Suwae ticket (abbreviated as Josua) also received the endorsement of Gerindra, despite the two parties being the main parties of the government (Koalisi Indonesia Hebat) and opposition (Koalisi Merah Putih) coalitions in the People's Representative Council. Deputy speaker of the parliament and Gerindra vice-chairman Fadli Zon noted that the alliance was "reflecting the aspirations of local areas".

== Results ==
Candidate	Running mate	Party	Votes	%
Lukas Enembe	Klemen Tinal	Democratic Party	1,939,539	67.54
John Wempi Wetipo	Habel Melkias Suwae	Indonesian Democratic Party of Struggle	932,008	32.46
Total			2,871,547	100.00
Valid votes			2,871,547	98.66
Invalid/blank votes			38,954	1.34
Total votes			2,910,501	100.00
Registered voters/turnout			3,336,134	87.24
Source: Tabloid Jubi, KPU

=== By region ===
Region	Lukas-Klemen	JWW-HMS	Valid votes	Invalid votes	Total
Asmat Regency	20,116 (32.51%)	41,758 (67.49%)	61,874	510	62,384
Biak Numfor Regency	26,823 (45.87%)	31,648 (54.13%)	58,471	1,261	59,732
Boven Digoel Regency	11,389 (65.29%)	6,056 (34.71%)	17,445	391	17,836
Deiyai Regency	54,173 (88.81%)	6,826 (11.19%)	60,999	0	60,999
Dogiyai Regency	68,561 (76.57%)	20,981 (23.43%)	89,542	1	89,543
Intan Jaya Regency	24,774 (30.24%)	57,156 (69.76%)	81,930	180	82,110
Jayapura Regency	25,971 (42.92%)	34,546 (57.08%)	60,517	1,584	62,101
Jayawijaya Regency	105,696 (40.12%)	157,736 (59.88%)	263,432	297	263,729
Keerom Regency	17,607 (62.70%)	10,474 (37.30%)	28,081	542	28,623
Yapen Islands Regency	31,050 (57.40%)	23,048 (42.60%)	54,098	1,811	55,909
Lanny Jaya Regency	147,880 (79.68%)	37,702 (20.32%)	185,582	832	186,414
Mamberamo Raya Regency	12,760 (67.79%)	6,062 (32.21%)	18,822	139	18,961
Mamberamo Tengah Regency	33,271 (100.00%)	0 (0.00%)	33,271	0	33,271
Mappi Regency	26,786 (70.66%)	11,122 (29.34%)	37,908	1,160	39,068
Merauke Regency	38,819 (49.44%)	39,694 (50.56%)	78,513	2,461	80,974
Mimika Regency	117,371 (65.64%)	61,441 (34.36%)	178,812	21,323	200,135
Nabire Regency	79,149 (56.13%)	61,872 (43.87%)	141,021	869	141,890
Nduga Regency	62,814 (66.67%)	31,402 (33.33%)	94,216	0	94,216
Paniai Regency	81,932 (81.01%)	19,211 (18.99%)	101,143	46	101,189
Pegunungan Bintang Regency	68,782 (71.32%)	27,659 (28.68%)	96,441	418	96,859
Puncak Regency	146,783 (92.70%)	11,557 (7.30%)	158,340	0	158,340
Puncak Jaya Regency	159,377 (88.33%)	21,053 (11.67%)	180,430	0	180,430
Sarmi Regency	6,023 (42.90%)	8,017 (57.10%)	14,040	481	14,521
Supiori Regency	4,269 (42.49%)	5,778 (57.51%)	10,047	119	10,166
Tolikara Regency	180,156 (80.96%)	42,359 (19.04%)	222,515	562	223,077
Waropen Regency	15,008 (51.27%)	14,263 (48.73%)	29,271	205	29,476
Yahukimo Regency	229,012 (79.02%)	60,805 (20.98%)	289,817	1,674	291,491
Yalimo Regency	77,986 (92.79%)	6,058 (7.21%)	84,044	4	84,048
Jayapura	65,201 (46.27%)	75,724 (53.73%)	140,925	2,084	143,009
Total	1,939,539 (67.54%)	932,008 (32.46%)	2,871,547	38,954	2,910,501
