= Diani =

Diani may refer to:

== People ==
- Djibril Diani (born 1998), French footballer
- Glen Diani, Irish musician
- Julie Diani, French academic
- Kadidiatou Diani (born 1995), French footballer
- Pietro Diani (died 1208), Italian cardinal

=== Given name ===
- Diani Budiarto (born 1955) Indonesian politician

== Locations ==
- Diani Beach, Kenyan beach
- Diani River
