= 2024 Central Papua gubernatorial election =

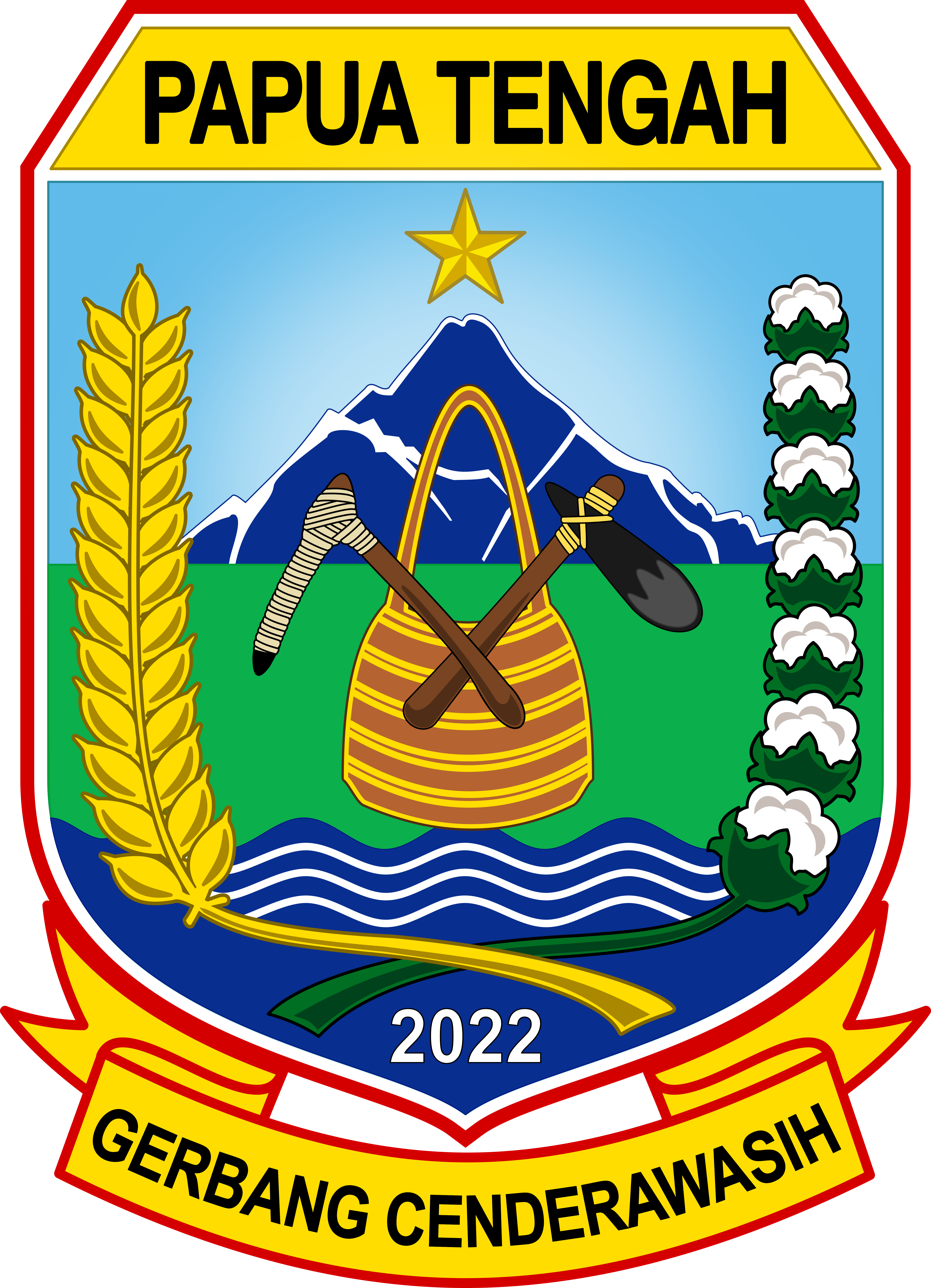
- 27 November 2024
- Turnout: 99.23%
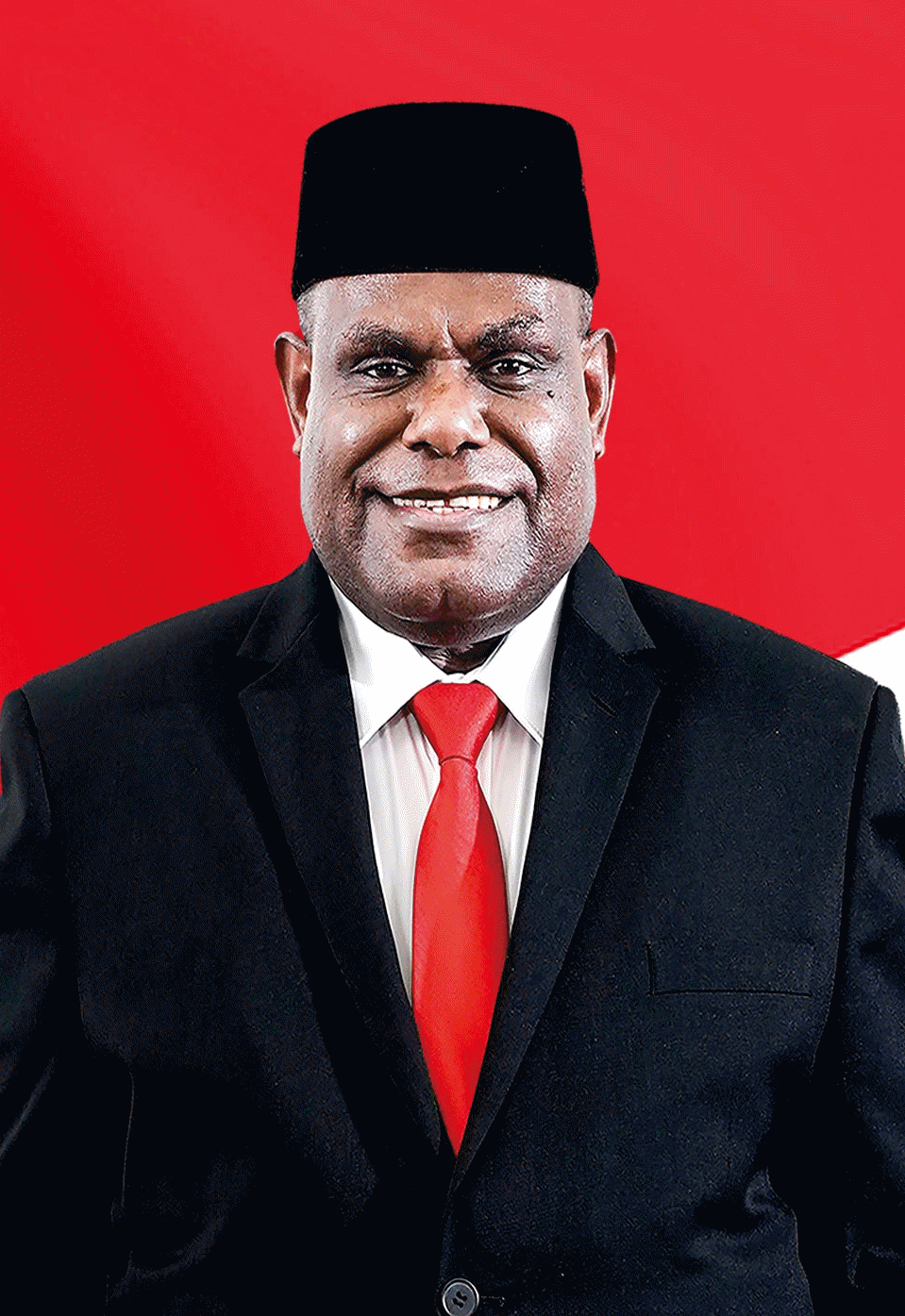

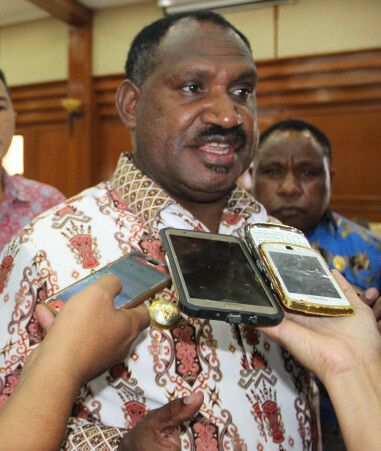

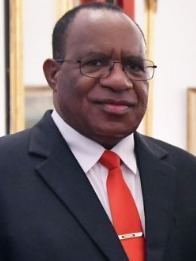

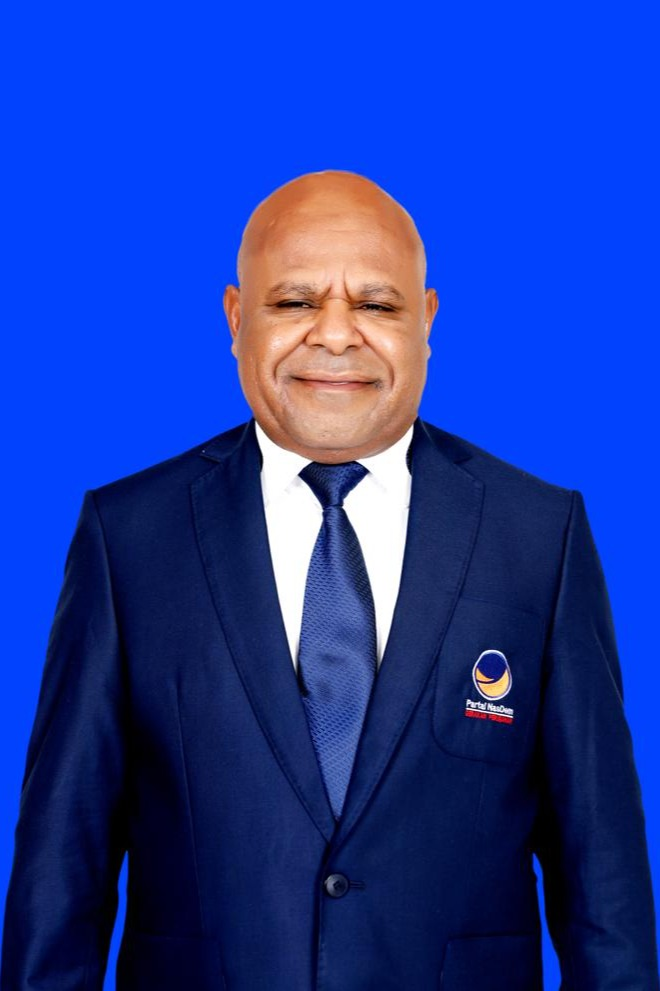
Candidate	Meki Fritz Nawipa	Willem Wandik
Party	PDI-P	Golkar
Running mate	Deinas Geley	Aloysius Giyai
Popular vote	502,624	373,721
Percentage	45.48%	33.81%
Candidate	John Wempi Wetipo	Natalis Tabuni
Party	Gerindra	NasDem
Alliance	KIM Plus	–
Running mate	Agustinus Anggaibak	Titus Natkime
Popular vote	122,246	106,664
Percentage	11.06%	9.65%
- Results by district
Governor before election
Anwar Harun Damanik (acting)
Independent
Elected Governor
Meki Fritz Nawipa
PDI-P

The 2024 Central Papua gubernatorial election was held on 27 November 2024 as part of nationwide local elections to elect the governor of Central Papua for a five-year term. It was the first gubernatorial election for the province since its creation in 2022. The election was won by Meki Fritz Nawipa of the Indonesian Democratic Party of Struggle (PDI-P) with 45% of the vote. Willem Wandik placed second with 33%. The Gerindra Party's John Wempi Wetipo received 11% of the vote and Natalis Tabuni of the NasDem Party received 9%.

== Electoral system ==
The election, like other local elections in 2024, follows the first-past-the-post system where the candidate with the most votes wins the election, even if they do not win a majority. It is possible for a candidate to run uncontested, in which case the candidate is still required to win a majority of votes "against" an "empty box" option. Should the candidate fail to do so, the election will be repeated on a later date.

== Candidates ==
According to electoral regulations, in order to qualify for the election, candidates were required to secure support from a political party or a coalition of parties controlling 9 seats (20 percent of all seats) in the Central Papua House of Representatives (DPRPT). The Indonesian Democratic Party of Struggle, with 11 of 45 seats, was eligible to nominate its own candidate for governor without forming a coalition with other parties. However, following a Constitutional Court of Indonesia decision in August 2024, the political support required to nominate a candidate was lowered to between 6.5 and 10 percent of the popular vote. Candidates may alternatively demonstrate support to run as an independent in form of photocopies of identity cards, but no such candidates registered with the General Elections Commission (KPU) prior to the set deadline.

=== Potential ===
The following are individuals who have either been publicly mentioned as a potential candidate by a political party in the DPRPT, publicly declared their candidacy with press coverage, or considered as a potential candidate by media outlets:

- Eltinus Omaleng (Golkar), regent of Mimika.
- John Wempi Wetipo (PDI-P), Deputy Minister of Home Affairs.
- Willem Wandik (PDI-P), former regent of Puncak (2013–2023).
- Deinas Gelei (PAN), former regent of Puncak Jaya.

== Results ==
Candidate	Running mate	Party	Votes	%
Meki Fritz Nawipa	Deinas Geley	Indonesian Democratic Party of Struggle	502,624	45.48
Willem Wandik	Aloysius Giyai	Golkar	373,721	33.81
John Wempi Wetipo	Agustinus Anggaibak	Gerindra Party	122,246	11.06
Natalis Tabuni	Titus Natkime	NasDem Party	106,664	9.65
Total			1,105,255	100.00
Valid votes			1,105,255	98.65
Invalid/blank votes			15,164	1.35
Total votes			1,120,419	100.00
Registered voters/turnout			1,129,141	99.23
Source: KPU

Candidate vote share by district
Wempi–Agustinus

Natalis–Titus

Meki–Deinas

Wandik–Giyai
