= Anis Matta =

Indonesian politician

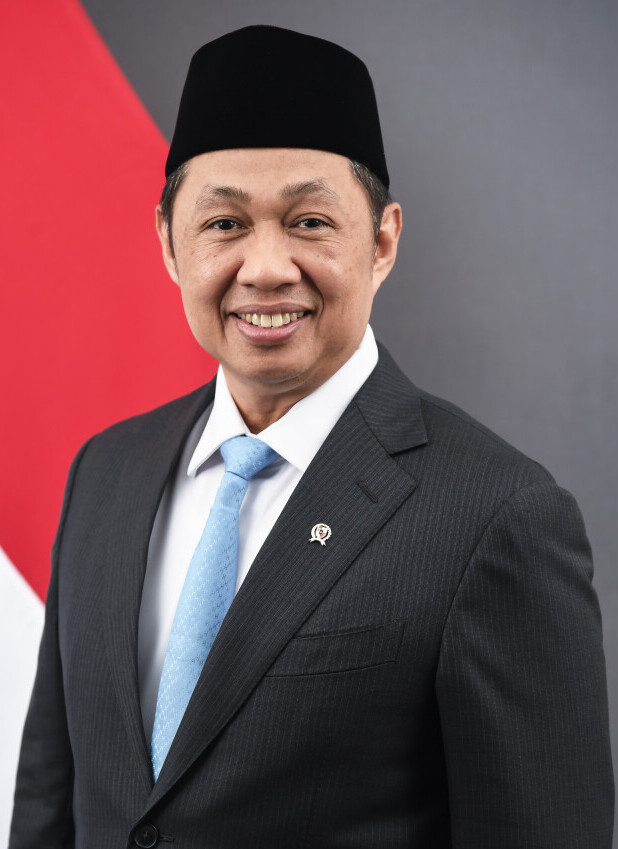
- Official portrait, 2024

Deputy Minister for Foreign Affairs
- Incumbent
- Assumed office 21 October 2024 Serving with Arrmanatha Nasir and Arif Havas Oegroseno
- President: Prabowo Subianto
- Minister: Sugiono; Arrmanatha Nasir

1st Chairman of the Gelora Party
- Incumbent
- Assumed office 10 November 2019
- Preceded by: Office established

6th President of Prosperous Justice Party
- In office 1 February 2013 – 10 August 2015
- Preceded by: Luthfi Hasan Ishaaq
- Succeeded by: Sohibul Iman

Deputy Speaker of the People's Representative Council
- In office 1 October 2009 – 1 February 2013
- Succeeded by: Sohibul Iman

Member of the People's Representative Council
- In office 1 October 2004 – 7 February 2013
- Constituency: Jakarta I (2004–2009); South Sulawesi I (2009–2013)

Personal details
- Born: 7 December 1968 (age 57) Bone, South Sulawesi, Indonesia
- Party: Gelora (since 2019)
- Other political affiliations: PKS (1998–2019)
- Spouses: Anaway Irianty Mansyur; Szilvi Fabula
- Children: 10
- Education: LIPIA; National Resilience Institute

Muhammad Anis Matta (born 7 December 1968) is an Indonesian politician who serves as a member of Gelora Party. He served as secretary general of Prosperous Justice Party for four consecutive terms (1998–2013) and was appointed for the first time at the age of 29, before being appointed as party chairman.

== Biography ==
Matta served as Deputy Speaker of People's Representative Council between 2009 and 2014, but resigned on 1 February 2013 to become chairman of PKS. He replaced Luthfi Hasan Ishaaq, who was convicted of corruption. On 10 November 2019, Matta was appointed chairman of Indonesian People's Waves Party (Gelora Party) with Fahri Hamzah former Prosperous Justice Party.

Matta was married to Anaway Irianty Mansyur, with whom he had seven children. He later married a Hungarian woman named Szilvi Fabula in 2006, which led to controversy over polygamy. Matta has three children with his second wife.

Political offices
Preceded by Luthfi Hasan Ishaaq	President of Prosperous Justice Party; 1 February 2013 – 10 August 2015	Succeeded by M. Sohibul Iman
