= Ribka Haluk =

Indonesian politician

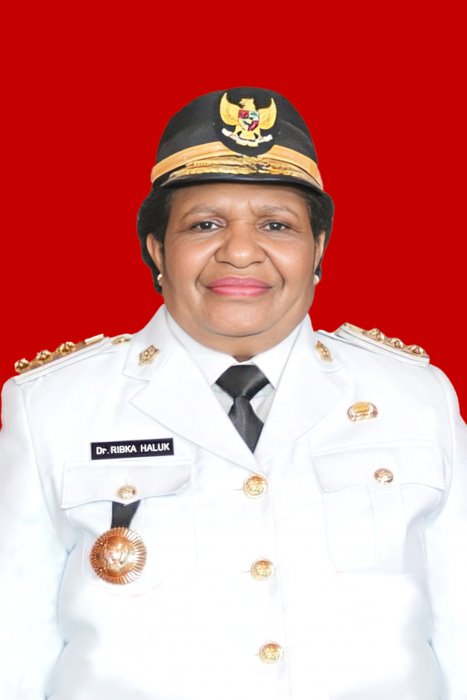

Deputy Minister of Home Affairs
- Incumbent
- Assumed office 21 October 2024 Serving with Bima Arya Sugiarto and Akhmad Wiyagus
- President: Prabowo Subianto
- Minister: Tito Karnavian
- Preceded by: John Wempi Wetipo
- Succeeded by: Akhmad Wiyagus

Acting Governor of Central Papua
- In office 11 November 2022 – 18 October 2024
- Preceded by: Herman Monim (as Governor of Central Irian Jaya)
- Succeeded by: Anwar Damanik (acting)

Head of the Social Affairs, Population, Women's Empowerment and Child Protection Agency of Papua (Note: The agency underwent several addition and removal of portofolios during Haluk's term. Haluk was first installed as the Head of Social and Settlement Agency in 2014.)
- In office 6 March 2014 – 9 November 2022
- Governor: Lukas Enembe
- Preceded by: Demianus Siep

Secretary of Central Papua
- In office 10 November 2023 – 18 October 2024
- Preceded by: Anwar Damanik (acting)
- Succeeded by: Anwar Damanik

Personal details
- Born: Ribka Haluk; January 10, 1971 (age 55) Piramid, Irian Jaya, Indonesia
- Party: Independent
- Spouse: Nikolaus Rumpombo
- Education: Cenderawasih University (S.Sos., Dr.); Garut University (M.M.)

Ribka Haluk (born 10 January 1971) is an Indonesian bureaucrat and deputy minister of home affairs since 21 October 2024. She previously held office as acting governor of Central Papua from 2022 to 2024 and head of Women Emancipation Office of Jayawijaya Regency in 2004 and then become acting regent of Mappi Regency in 2017 and also acting regent of Yalimo Regency in 2021. She was appointed as a special staff under Ministry of Home Affairs before being appointed again as the acting governor of newly formed province of Central Papua. She is the first female Papuan to be appointed as a governor.

== Early life and education ==
Haluk was born in Piramid, a district of Jayawijaya Regency in the Papua province, on 10 January 1971. Upon graduating from high school, Haluk attended the Cenderawasih University and received a degree in social studies after finishing her studies there. Haluk continued her studies at the University of Garut and received a graduate degree in administrative sciences. She later received a doctor degree from the Cenderawasih University in management.

== Career ==
Haluk joined the civil service upon her graduation from Cenderawasih University. She was assigned to the Jayawijaya regional government, where she become the head of the family welfare improvement sub-agency of the region in 2001. Three years later, Haluk received a promotion and was entrusted to lead the region's women empowerment office.

After five years leading the women empowerment office, Haluk became the head of the region administrative sub-bureau. She returned to the women empowerment office—which was renamed to women empowerment and family planning agency—a year later and became its secretary. She became the new agency's head in 2011.

Haluk was called to the government of the Papua province after about a decade in Jayawijaya. Ribka became the Head of the Social Welfare and Isolated Communities Agency of Papua in 2013. The agency was renamed to the Social and Settlement Agency a year later, and Haluk was installed as the head of the new agency on 6 March 2014. During her tenure as head of the agency, Haluk twice served as an acting regent. She first served as acting regent in the Mappi Regency from 11 April to 22 May 2017, replacing Stefanus Kasima, another acting regent whose term have ended. Her second time as acting regent came during the riots that occurred as a result of the dispute after the commencement of the June 2021 Yalimo regent election. Haluk was appointed as the acting regent of the region on 26 August 2021, with the main task of pacifying the region through communication with all stakeholders involved. There were some doubts by the Minister of Home Affairs Tito Karnavian regarding her ability to resolve the riots and the electoral dispute. The conflict later ended following a decision by the constitutional court and a definitive regent was installed in place of her on 1 April 2022. Haluk's success in resolving the conflict, as well as the fact that her husband is from Nabire, were cited as one of the reasons Tito appointed her as the acting governor of Central Papua.

After eight years serving as the head of the agency, Haluk was discharged from the post and became the expert staff for personnel and public services on 9 November 2022. She became the acting governor of Central Papua two days later.
