= Djamaluddin Tambunan =

Indonesian bureaucrat and politician

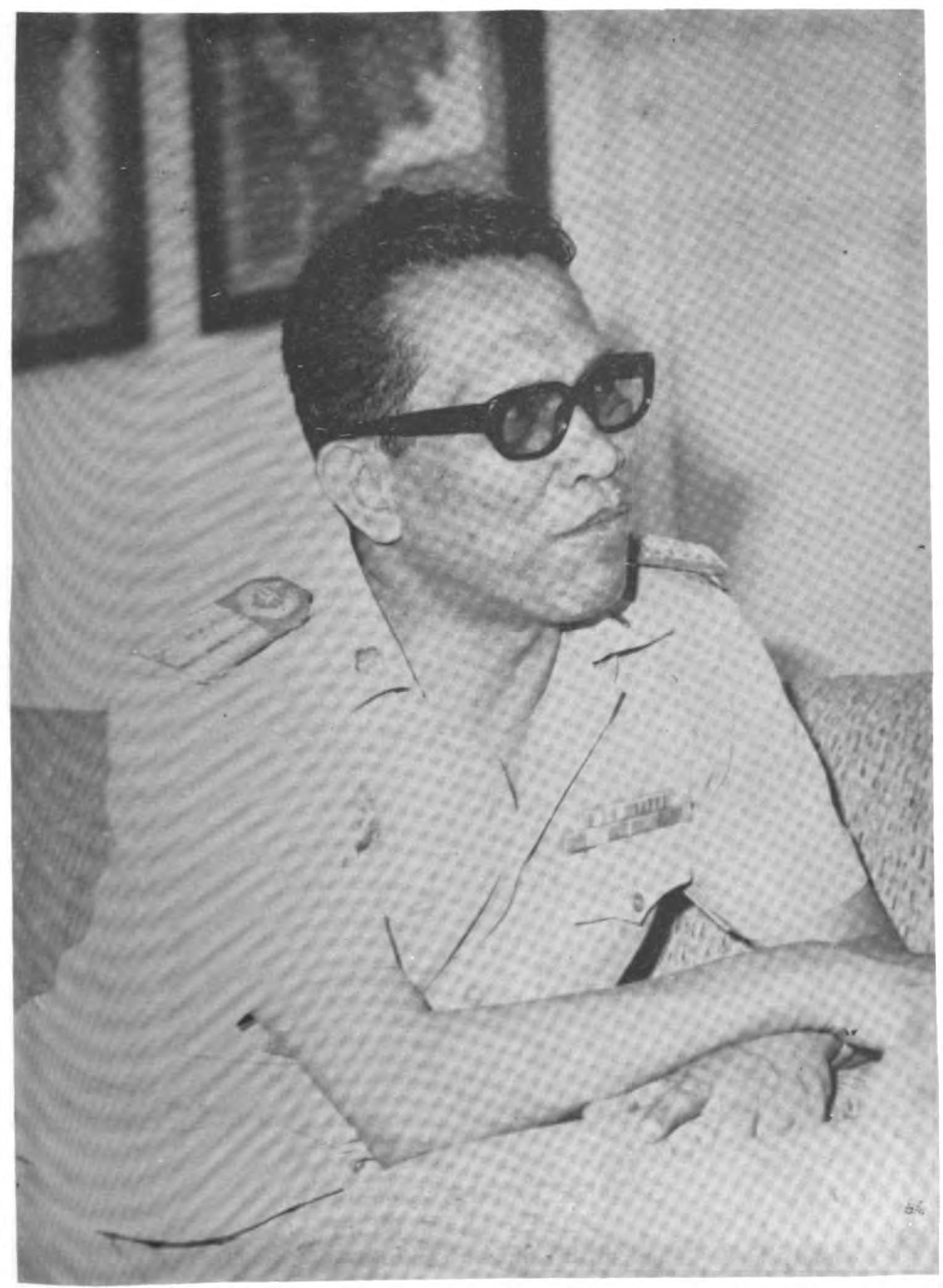

Governor of Jambi
- In office 15 June 1974 – 10 December 1979
- President: Suharto
- Preceded by: Noer Atmadibrata
- Succeeded by: Masjchun Sofwan

Member of the House of Representatives
- In office 1 October 1982 – 1 October 1992
- Parliamentary group: Golkar
- Constituency: North Sumatra

Regional Secretary of North Sumatra
- In office 18 April 1973 – 22 June 1974
- Preceded by: Sutan Singengu Paruhuman
- Succeeded by: Bardansyah

Personal details
- Born: 4 February 1922 Batavia, Dutch East Indies
- Died: 16 October 2001 (aged 79)
- Spouse: Nurbanun Tambunan (nee Siregar)
- Education: Islamic University of North Sumatra (S.H.)

Djamaluddin Tambunan (4 February 1922 – 16 October 2001) was an Indonesian bureaucrat and politician. He primarily served in the regional government of North Sumatera, reaching the rank of regional secretary in 1973 before being transferred to Jambi as the province's governor in 1974. After the end of his term as governor in 1979, he was transferred to the Department of Home Affairs to lead the department's research and development agency. He was elected as a member of parliament from Golkar in 1982 in 1987.

== Early life and Indonesian National Revolution ==
Djamaluddin was born on 4 February 1922 in Jakarta. He completed his basic education at the Hollandsch Inlandsche Kweekschool in Bandung in 1942 and began teaching as a primary school teacher in Tanjungbalai. Following the independence of Indonesia, Djamaluddin joined the local civil government in Tanjungbalai and was assigned as the wedana (assistant regent) of Rantau Prapat, the capital of Tanjungbalai, on 16 January 1946.

Around the time of the Dutch's Operation Product, Djamaluddin was transferred to the nearby Asahan regency, where he became the patih, or second-in-command of the local government. He was later promoted to become the military regent of the region, with responsibility over both civilian and military matters. In order to assume command over military units in the region, he was given the rank of major. During his tenure, Djamaluddin established the Asahan branch of the Indonesian Youth Front, a paramilitary unit which later changed its name to the Youth Front, and the Indonesian Socialist Youth Knights, which was the military wing of the Indonesian Socialist Youth.

Between 1946 and 1947, conflict occurred between the Chinese population in Bagansiapiapi, Riau, who refused to fly the Indonesian flag alongside the Kuomintang flag, and the local Malay population. The Indonesian forces responded by attacking Chinese neighborhood in Bagansiapiapi. The local Chinese paramilitia, Pao An Tui, retaliated, and a clash occurred between the two forces. After the clashes stopped, Djamaluddin was sent by the Sumatra provincial government to restore the local government in Bagansiapiapi.

The Dutch's second military aggression, codenamed Operation Kraai, forced Djamaluddin to govern whilst commanding guerilla warfare against the Dutch forces. From 21 September to 31 December 1949, Djamaluddin was briefly assigned to Labuhanbatu as military regent by acting military governor Ibrahim Adjie.

At the time of his appointment, the region was under the jurisdiction of the State of East Sumatra, one of the constituent state of the United States of Indonesia. Following the dissolution of the state, the Preparatory Committee for the Unitary State of East Sumatra (PPNKST, Panitia Persiapan Negara Kesatuan buat Sumatera Timur) was established in its place. The committee, which later changed its name to Preparatory Committee for the Establishment of the Province of North Sumatra (P4SU, Panitia Persiapan Pembentukan Propinsi Sumatera Utara), appointed Djamaluddin Tambunan as the acting regent of Labuhanbatu.

== Post-war career ==
On 22 May 1951, the governor of North Sumatra Abdul Hakim Harahap removed Djamaluddin from office and appointed Abdul Wahid Er from Masyumi as the replacement. The removal sparked protest from parties in the region, including from Masyumi itself. In a letter addressed to the House of Representatives dated 24 May 1951, Masyumi, Indonesian Christian Party, Communist Party of Indonesia, Socialist Party of Indonesia, and several trade unions, urged the parliament to prevent Djamaluddin's removal from office. After Abdul Wahid assumed office on 28 May, the chairman of the local branch of Masyumi stated that Masyumi supported the governor's decision, and that the letter was signed without any organizational consent. Djamaluddin's replacement was also met with strong opposition by the civil servants, who threatened to resign if the governor did not revoke the decision to appoint Abdul Wahid within fifteen days.

Upon his dismissal, Djamaluddin was assigned to the North Sumatra governor's office as a senior civil servant. In August 1951, he was sent to Jakarta to represent the governor in a conference on the provision of essential goods and services to civil servants. On 29 October 1951, Djamaluddin was appointed by the governor as a member of North Sumatra's regional commission for the settlement of labor disputes (P4D, Panitia Penjelesaian Perselisihan Perburuhan Daerah). P4D was formed in response to the continuous labor disputes in the region and consisted of representatives from various sectors of labor union.

Djamaluddin was then appointed as chief of economic affairs after finishing a course on economics. In 1952, Djamaluddin warned employers in North Sumatra for not using their allocated rice quotas, and as a result, they risk losing their status as recognized distributors. A few years later, Djamaluddin's portofolio was expanded to handle social matters in the province.

On 1 March 1957, Djamaluddin was appointed as the mayor of the Pematangsiantar, which at that time had just been elevated to city status five months prior. Djamaluddin became mayor for two years. During this time, he joined the Nahdlatul Ulama party and was appointed as the chief of economic affairs of the party's branch in Sumatra. He briefly served as the regent of Simalungun from 1959 to 1960 before being reassigned to the governor's office.

Djamaluddin worked as a senior officer in the governor's office from 1960 to 1973. During this period, Djamaluddin attended a military course for civil servants 1962 and a higher course on general governance in Jakarta in 1966. He held a number of position of posts in the regional government, including as the chief of staff of administration affairs in the North Sumatra civil defence, secretary of the North Sumatra welfare council, chairman of the North Sumatra Rubber Funds, and chairman of the North Sumatra Tourism Board. In early 1967, he was named as a possible candidate for the governor of North Sumatra. Djamaluddin became the chairman of the first Medan Fair in 1972.

On 18 April 1973, Djamaluddin was appointed as the provincial secretary of North Sumatra, the most senior position for civil servant in the province. By governor Marah Halim Harahap, he was given the rank of junior governor, thus giving him the authority to act as Harahap's deputy and represent the governor in his absence. Djamaluddin studied law at the Islamic University of North Sumatra and received his degree in 1974.

== Governor and later career ==
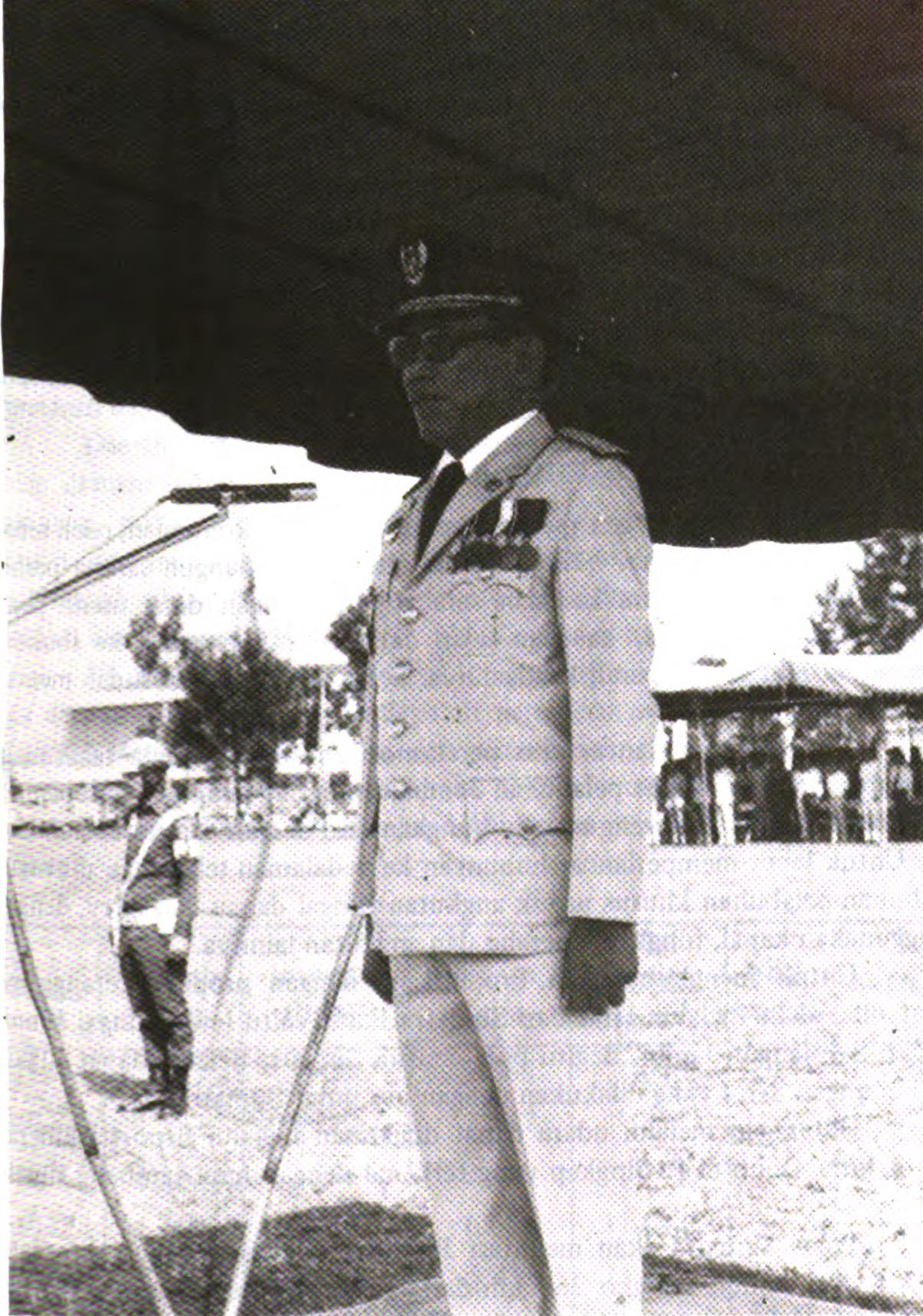
Djamaluddin Tambunan leading a ceremony as the governor of Jambi.

After twenty-four years serving in North Sumatra, Djamaluddin was appointed as the governor of Jambi. He was first appointed in an acting capacity on 15 June 1974, before being nominated as a sole candidate for the governorship by the local parliament and was installed on 2 November the same year. Djamaluddin's nomination was criticized by parliament member Amin Iskandar, who argued that the local parliament must nominate three candidates instead of only one candidate.

During his tenure, Djamaluddin oversaw the construction of a campus for the province's governance academy as well as moving the capital of the Batanghari Regency from Kenali Asem to Muara Bulian. In 1976, Djamaluddin officially abolished local government levies on all export commodities in Jambi. He also established a supervisory body for the timber auction pool in Jambi in order to ensure the quality and availability of timber for the wood industry in Jambi.

Djamaluddin's term as governor ended on 10 December 1979. At the end of his term, Djamaluddin published a 364-page book, titled Jambi Awaiting Touch (Jambi Yang Menanti Jamahan). The book details the development of Jambi during his tenure from 1974 to 1979 and covers various aspects of Jambi's development, including the economy, social culture, religion, regional development, politics, governance, and public order. Jambi historian Jumardi Putra lauded the book as a "new tradition" of public officials authoring a book but described it as lacking in analysis and unengaging.

On 29 August 1980, Djamaluddin was installed as the head of the research and development agency in the Department of Home Affairs, replacing Achmad Adnawidjaja. During his tenure, Djamaluddin signed research cooperation agreements with several state universities in Indonesia.

Djamaluddin was elected as a member of the House of Representatives in 1982 and 1987 from Golkar, representing the North Sumatra electoral district.

== Personal life ==
Djamaluddin married Nurbanun Siregar in Pematangsiantar on 15 May 1946. The two met while working as a teacher in Tanjungbalai. The couple gave birth to nine children, although two died in infancy. Nurbanun gave birth to her first child, Irma Miraza, in the midst of the Dutch's Operation Product. The Dutch forces, who surrounded Djamaluddin's official residence, forced him to hide in the bushes while carrying the bag Nurbanun had prepared for him. Two months after giving birth to Irma, Nurbanun was evacuated from the Dutch-occupied Tanjungbalai to Padangsidempuan. Irma died days later after the evacuation due to malnutrition.

Nurbanun gave birth to her third child while under arrest. The Dutch's Operation Kraai successfully surrounded Djamaluddin's residence in Pulau Raja, Asahan. Nurbanun was arrested by the Dutch and was brought to the Tanjungbalai Hospital, while Djamaluddin successfully fled for his safety. Nurbanun gave birth to his second child in the hospital. She named her third child Amri, the inverse of her late daughter's name Irma. Four months after giving birth to Amri, Nurbanun fled from the hospital and successfully joined her husband in Labuhanbatu by disguising herself as a farmer's wife carrying a bullock cart. Nurbanun's fourth child, Tiurma, died while in infancy.

Amri later followed Djamaluddin's footsteps in the government, serving as the regent of Deli Serdang from 2004 to 2014. His younger brother, Ashari Tambunan, continued his tenure as Deli Serdang's regent, serving in the position from 2014 to 2023. Ashari's son, Adlin Umar Yusri Tambunan, is the deputy regent of Serdang Bedagai since 2021 and was elected for a second term in 2024. Amri's son, Asri Ludin Tambunan, was previously the health chief of Deli Serdang and was elected to continue the family's rule in Deli Serdang in 2024.

Djamaluddin died on 16 October 2001 and was buried at the Bukit Barisan Heroes Cemetery in Medan.
