= Dedie Rachim =

Indonesian politician

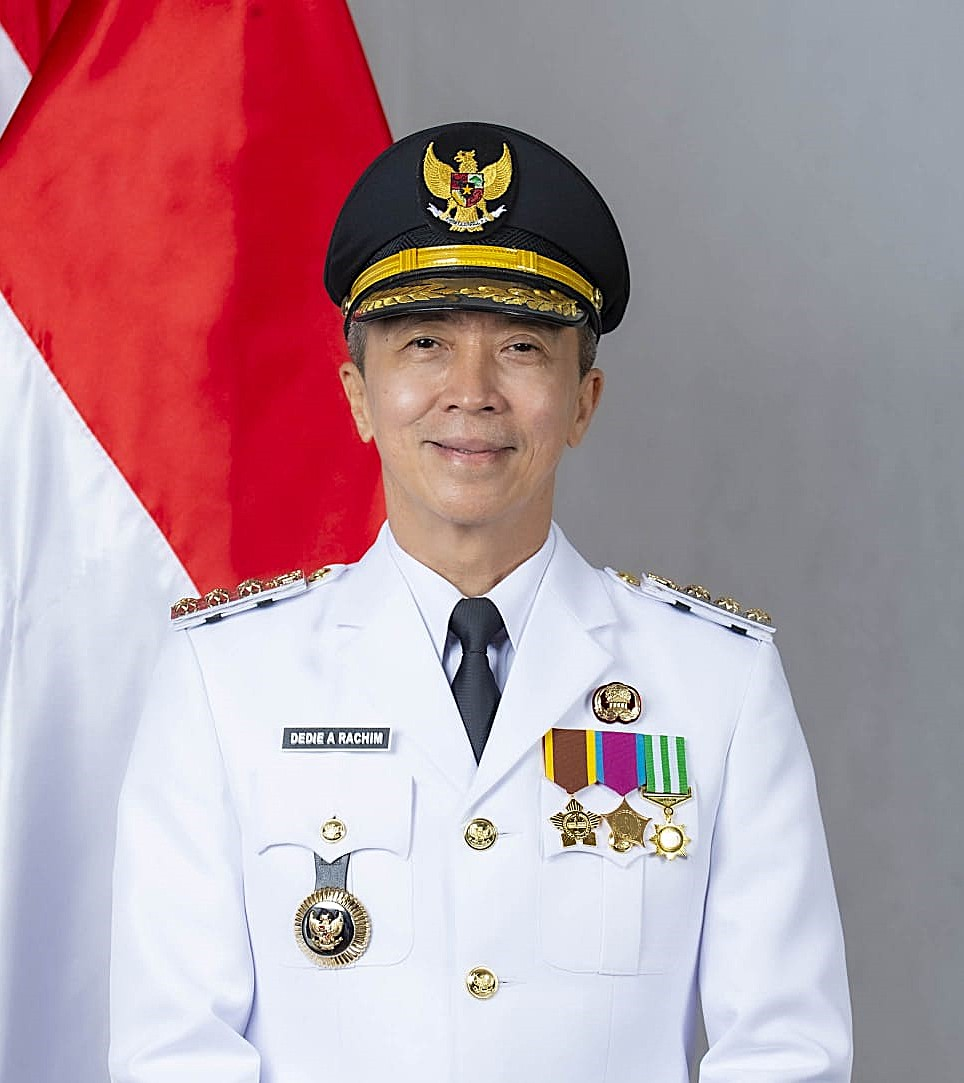

17th Mayor of Bogor
- Incumbent
- Assumed office 20 February 2025
- Deputy: Jenal Mutaqin
- Preceded by: Bima Arya Sugiarto; Hery Antasari (acting)

Vice Mayor of Bogor
- In office 20 April 2019 – 20 April 2024
- Mayor: Bima Arya Sugiarto
- Preceded by: Usmar Hariman
- Succeeded by: Jenal Mutaqin

Personal details
- Born: Dedie Abdu Rachim; 6 April 1966 (age 60) Garut, West Java, Indonesia
- Party: PAN

Dedie Abdu Rachim (born 6 April 1966) is an Indonesian politician and former staff of the Corruption Eradication Commission (KPK) who is the incumbent mayor of Bogor, serving since February 2025 after winning the 2024 Bogor mayoral election. Previously, he was served as the vice mayor of Bogor, West Java between 2019 and 2024, under Bima Arya Sugiarto.

== Early life ==
Dedie Abdu Rachim was born on 6 April 1966 in Garut Regency, West Java. Although Rachim is a Muslim, he studied at the Catholic Regina Pacis School in Bogor. After graduating from Regina Pacis High School Bogor, he studied Industrial Design at the Bandung Institute of Technology. In 2013, Rachim received a master's degree from the University of Indonesia in public administration. In 2026, Rachim received a doctoral's degree from Padjadjaran University as Law Doctor

== Career ==
=== KPK ===
After completing his studies, Rachim worked as a private employee for some time. In 2005, he passed a selection to become a Corruption Eradication Commission (KPK) staff and joined the organization. He was a regular functionary until 2009, then until 2017 he served as director or acting director of several KPK units, including its wealth reporting, research and development, public education, and government relations units. His duties at KPK were primarily public and inter-agency outreach.

=== Bogor ===
In December 2017, incumbent mayor of Bogor Bima Arya invited Rachim to become his running mate in Arya's bid for a second term. On 27 December 2017, Rachim resigned from KPK in order to do so, making him the first active KPK official to resign to take part in an election. Prior KPK officials which entered politics had only done so after retiring from KPK. Arya-Rachim, supported by a coalition of parties including National Mandate Party (PAN), Demokrat, Hanura, Golkar and Nasdem, won in the election with 215,708 votes (43.6%) in a four-candidate race. Rachim was sworn in as vice mayor on 20 April 2019.

In February 2024, Rachim joined PAN as a member, as the party gave its support to Rachim to run as mayor in the 2024 mayoral election. Arya and Rachim's term ended on 20 April 2024, and in a farewell speech Arya endorsed Rachim's bid for mayor. Rachim proceeded to win with 183,500 votes (37.4 percent) in the five-way election, securing the most votes in all five city districts. He was sworn in as mayor on 20 February 2025.

As mayor, Rachim issued a regulation limiting the age of share taxis (angkot) operating in the city, leading to protests from angkot drivers. In October 2025, he remarked that he was authoring a 2045 master plan for the city, including trams and feeders for a LRT line connecting the city to Jakarta at the Baranangsiang Terminal.

In September 2026, Dedie Rachim received a Doctoral's degree from the Padjajaran University Bandung
