= Gelora Party =

Political party in Indonesia

Indonesian People's Wave Party Partai Gelombang Rakyat Indonesia
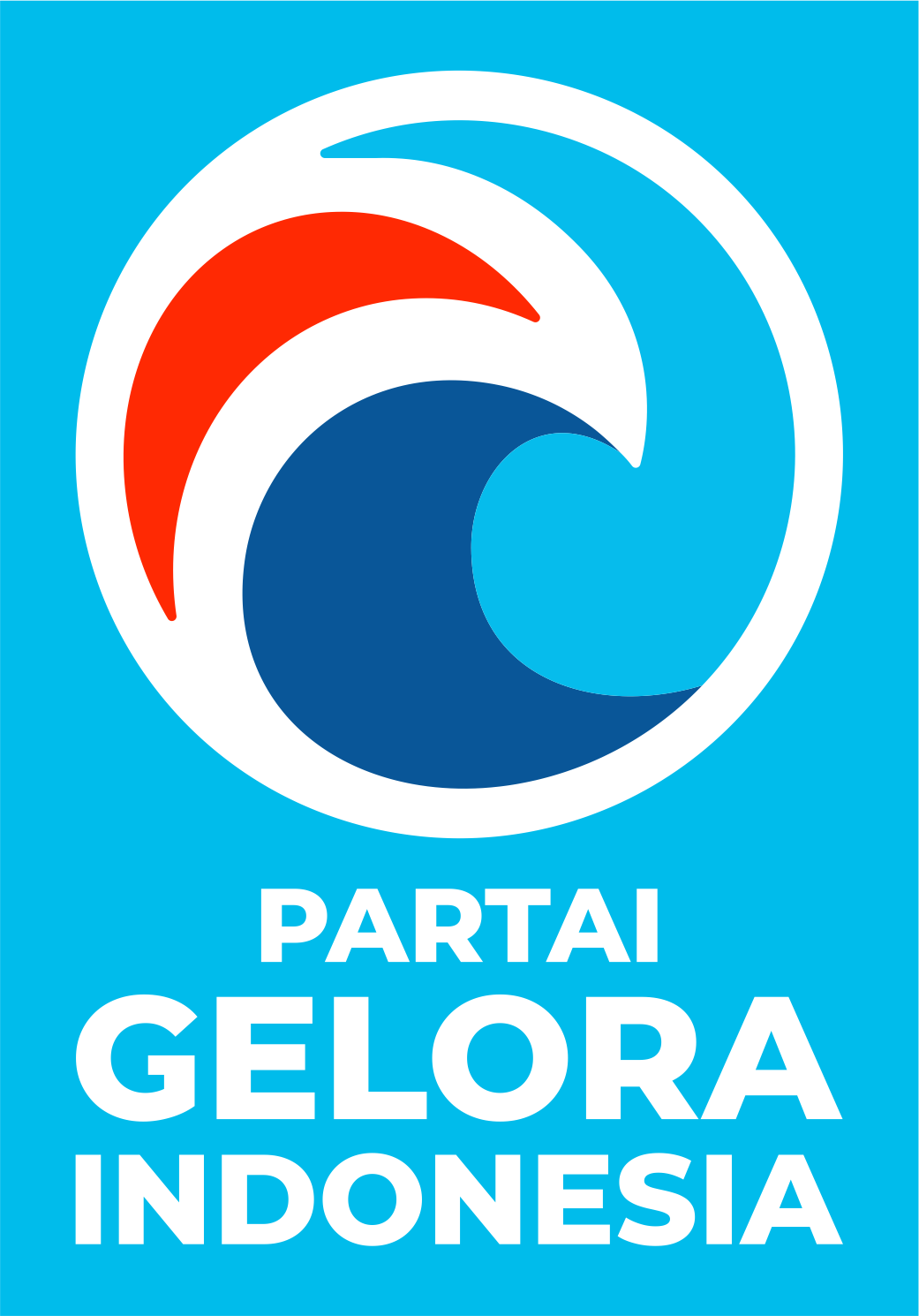
- Abbreviation: Gelora
- General Chairman: Anis Matta
- Secretary-General: Mahfudz Siddiq
- Founders: Anis Matta; Fahri Hamzah
- Founded: 28 October 2019; 7 years ago
- Split from: PKS
- Headquarters: Jakarta
- Ideology: Pancasila; Islamic democracy Islamic socialism Islamic modernism Populism
- Political position: Centre to centre-right
- National affiliation: Advanced Indonesia Coalition
- Ballot number: 7
- DPR seats: 0 / 580
- DPRD I seats: 1 / 2,372
- DPRD II seats: 72 / 17,510

Website
- partaigelora.id

Indonesian People's Wave Party (Indonesian: Partai Gelombang Rakyat Indonesia), commonly abbreviated as Gelora (Passion), is a political party in Indonesia. The party establishment was declared on 10 November 2019, and its political party status was recognised by the Ministry of Law and Human Rights on 2 June 2020.

The party is founded by former Prosperous Justice Party (PKS) members Anis Matta and Fahri Hamzah, among others, with actor and former West Java deputy governor Deddy Mizwar also joined the new party. Gelora Party portrays itself as nationalist and an adherent of Pancasila despite their former Islamist PKS background. Gelora Party aimed to attract undecided voters, and to participate in 2020 local elections.

== History ==
The Indonesian People's Wave Party or Gelora was founded on October 28, 2019 with the idea and ideals of making Indonesia a power in the top five of the world. This idea was first conveyed by Anis Matta in his speech "New Directions for Indonesia" at the KAMMI Alumni Family Work Conference in Jakarta, 3 February 2018. This speech continues the idea of "Indonesia's Third Wave" which Anis wrote in 2014.

Next, the process of establishing a Party began by forming a Preparatory Team for the Formation of a New Party led by Mahfudz Siddiq. Apart from officially having a legal entity, currently the Gelora Indonesia Party has management in 34 DPWs at the provincial level, 445 DPDs at the district & city level, and 4,395 DPCs at the sub-district level.

In the 2024 legislative election, the party failed to win enough votes to qualify for the national House of Representatives. The party claimed that over 70 of its candidates were elected to seats in city and regency DPRD across the country, and it also won one seat in the provincial DPRD of Highland Papua.

== Ideology ==
Anis Matta described the party's ideology as "Pancasila with Islamic identity", and stated that Gelora is not "PKS-Perjuangan" (Prosperous Justice Party-Struggle).

== Election results ==
=== Legislative election results ===
Election	Ballot number	Total seats won	Total votes	Share of votes	Outcome of election	Party leader
2024	7	0 / 580	1,282,000	0.84%	Governing coalition	Anis Matta

=== Presidential election results ===
Election	Ballot number	Candidate	Running mate	1st round (Total votes)	Share of votes	Outcome	2nd round (Total votes)	Share of votes	Outcome
2024	2	Prabowo Subianto	Gibran Rakabuming Raka	96,214,691	58.59%	Elected			
