= Sohibul Iman =

Indonesian politician (born 1965)

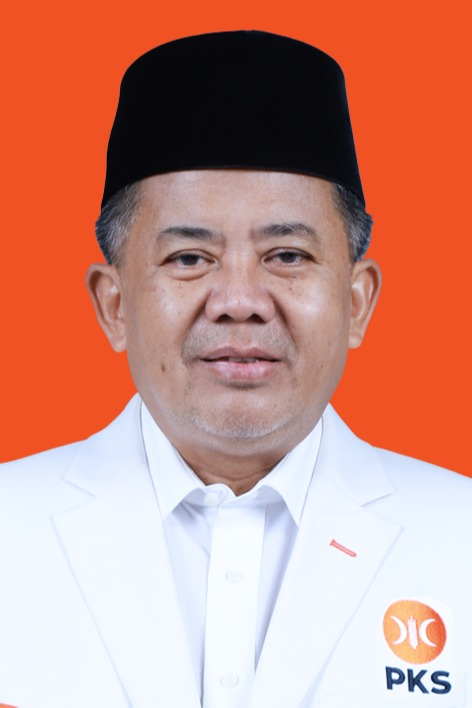

Deputy Speaker of the People's Consultative Assembly
- Incumbent
- Assumed office 16 November 2026 Serving with 9 other people

7th President of Prosperous Justice Party
- In office 10 August 2015 – 5 October 2020
- Preceded by: Anis Matta
- Succeeded by: Ahmad Syaikhu

Deputy Speaker of the People's Representative Council
- In office 1 February 2013 – 20 October 2014
- President: Susilo Bambang Yudhoyono
- Preceded by: Anis Matta
- Succeeded by: Taufik Kurniawan

Personal details
- Born: 5 October 1965 (age 61) Tasikmalaya, West Java, Indonesia
- Party: PKS
- Spouse: Uswindraningsih Titus
- Children: 5
- Parents: Djojo Sutedjo (father); Iloh Halimah (mother)
- Relatives: Oded M. Danial (elder brother)
- Education: Waseda University; Takushoku University; JAIST
- Website: sohibuliman.com

Muhammad Sohibul Iman (born 5 October 1965) is an Indonesian politician and a member of the Prosperous Justice Party. He succeeded Anis Matta as Deputy Speaker of the Indonesian People's Representative Council when Anis was appointed President of the Prosperous Justice Party by its Syura Assembly.

== Early life and education ==
Iman was born in Tasikmalaya on 5 October 1965. He attended Bogor Agricultural University for three terms until he received a scholarship and moved to Waseda University, Japan, where he earned a Bachelor of Engineering, then a Master of Engineering from Takushoku University and a PhD from the Graduate School of Science Knowledge at Japan Advanced Institute of Science and Technology (JAIST).

== Political career ==
In 1998, Sohibul joined the Justice Party and became the head of its Department of Technology and Environment. In 2005, he became head of the party's Economy, Finance, Industry, and Technology Department, a position he held until 2010. He was elected to the People's Representative Council in 2009, became a member of the People's Representative Council's State Financial Accountability Agency in 2010 and 12 February 2013, became deputy speaker of the council after Matta was promoted, replacing Luthfi Hasan Ishaaq who was convicted of corruption.

In the People's Consultative Assembly, he is one of 35 members of the Four Pillars of National Socialization team.

He was reelected to the council for 2014–2019, but he resigned in 2017.

== Other Activities ==
Sohibul is active in organizations, such as ISTECS (Institute for Science and Technology Studies), YPNF (Nurul Fikri Education Foundation), HSF (Hokuriku Scientific Forum), MITI (Indonesian Scientist and Technologist Society), YIT (Technology Innovation Foundation), ISSS (International Society for System Sciences), JSSPRM (Japan Society for Science Policy and Research Management), and IEEE (Institute of Electric and Electronics Engineers).
