= Fahri Hamzah =

Indonesian politician

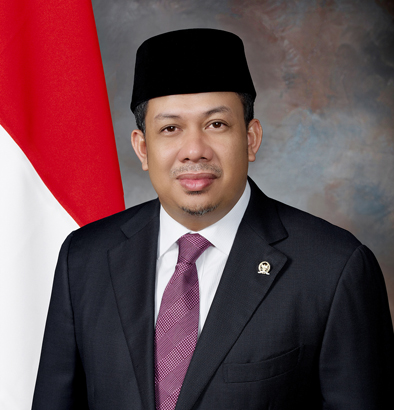

Deputy Minister of Housing and Residential Area
- Incumbent
- Assumed office 21 October 2024
- President: Prabowo Subianto
- Minister: Maruarar Sirait
- Preceded by: John Wempi Wetipo (as Deputy Minister of Public Works and Public Housing)

Member of House of Representatives
- In office 1 October 2004 – 1 October 2019
- Constituency: West Nusa Tenggara

Fourth Deputy Speaker of the House of Representatives
- In office 2 October 2014 – 1 October 2019
- Speaker: Setya Novanto; Ade Komaruddin; Bambang Soesatyo
- Preceded by: Priyo Budi Santoso
- Succeeded by: Muhaimin Iskandar

Personal details
- Born: 10 November 1971 (age 54) Sumbawa, Indonesia
- Party: Gelora (since 2019)
- Other political affiliations: PKS (until 2016); Independent (2016–2019)
- Spouse: Farida Briani
- Children: 5
- Education: University of Indonesia (S.E.)

Fahri Hamzah (born 10 November 1971) is an Indonesian politician and former deputy speaker of the Indonesia House of Representatives. He first became a member of the legislative body in 2004 and has been re-elected twice in the same election district.

== Political career ==
=== Prosperous Justice Party ===
After graduating from the University of Indonesia, Hamzah founded the KAMMI (Kesatuan Aksi Mahasiswa Muslim Indonesia/Indonesian Muslim University Students' Action Union) and became its first president in the political situation after the fall of Suharto. Later, he joined the Prosperous Justice Party after briefly working as an expert staff for the People's Consultative Assembly.

=== House of Representatives ===
==== First term (2004–2009) ====
He ran in the 2004 elections as a nominee for his home district of West Nusa Tenggara, and won a seat. In his first term, he admitted to receiving non-budgetary benefits from then-Minister of Fishery Rokhmin Dahuri, which resulted in his being reprimanded by the body's ethical council (Dewan Kehormatan) and was barred from holding a position until 2009.

==== Second term (2009–2014) ====
In 2009, however, he successfully ran for re-election after winning 105,412 votes, the second highest in the district out of 10 elected representatives. During his second term, he caused a controversy by calling for the disbanding of the Corruption Eradication Commission. Also in the same term, he served as a member of the body's ethical council briefly during the 2011–2012 period.

==== Third term (2014–2019) ====
After placing first in the district for his second re-election in 2014 with 125,083 votes, he was elected as Deputy Speaker of the parliament on 2 October, during which the minority ruling coalition walked out of the parliament building due to a perceived unfairness of the majority opposition placing only their members on the body's speaker positions.

=== Dismissal from PKS ===
On 11 March 2016, he was dismissed from the Prosperous Justice Party (PKS) for making several seemingly controversial, counter-productive and improper statements (a little bit stupid [sic]). In accordance, his former party proposed for another member of the parliament Ledia Hanifa Amaliah to replace him as Deputy Speaker. However, Hamzah is still active as Deputy Speaker as of December 2017. Following the dismissal, he sued his former party, winning up to the level of the Supreme Court which awarded him Rp 30 billion in damages (US$2.1 million).

During the voting of the 2017 electoral law, opposition parties all walked out from the parliament's chamber. However, Hamzah decided to remain, despite his sole opposition to a section of the electoral law regulating a 20 percent presidential candidacy threshold with all other members remaining voting in favor of it.

=== Gelora Party ===
He did not run for reelection in 2019. He then co-founded the Indonesian People's Wave Party (Gelora) with a number of other former PKS politicians, and became its vice chairman. He ran as a DPR candidate from Gelora in the 2024 election, winning 55,319 votes from West Nusa Tenggara's 1st district, but failed to win a seat.
