= Bogor City Regional House of Representatives =

Municipal legislature in West Java, Indonesia

Coordinates: 06°35′46″S 106°47′35″E

Bogor City Regional House of Representatives Dewan Perwakilan Rakyat Daerah Kota Bogor
- 2024–2029 period

Type
- Type: Unicameral

Leadership
- Speaker: Adityawarman Adil, PKS since 24 September 2024

Structure
- Political groups: PKS (11) Golkar (7) PDI-P (6) Gerindra (6) PAN (5) Nasdem (4) PKB (4) Demokrat (3) PPP (3) PSI (1)

Elections
- Voting system: Open list
- Last general election: 14 February 2024
- Next general election: 2029

Website
- setwan.kotabogor.go.id

The Bogor City Regional House of Representatives is the unicameral municipal legislature of the city of Bogor, West Java, Indonesia. It has 50 members, who are elected every five years, simultaneously with the national legislative election.

== History ==
The city of Bogor (then known as Buitenzorg) was granted autonomous city (Gemeente) status under the Dutch East Indies in 1905. The city council (gemeenteraad) was formed on 18 March 1905, and the members took office on 1 April 1905. Buitenzorg's city council was, along with the ones in Batavia and Meester-Cornelis (both part of modern Jakarta), the oldest city council in the Dutch East Indies, predating others such as Bandung and Semarang by one year. The first membership consisted of 11 members, including 8 Europeans, 2 Native Indonesians and 1 Kapitein der Chinezen.

After the Indonesian National Revolution, the city council of Bogor was reformed with 15 members. They were in office until 1955, and in 1957 new members took office after a local election. The legislature's membership was increased to 22 in 1971, 45 by the 2004 election, and 50 by the 2019 election.

The legislature convenes at a building at Pemuda Street in Bogor, which was opened in 2019. Its previous office building had been converted into a public library.

=== Graft case ===
In December 2009, 20 former members of the legislature in the 1999–2004 period were arrested under corruption charges related to the city's 2002 budget. A further 12 legislators were made suspects. On 2 August 2010, all 32 suspects were found guilty and sentenced to 1 year in prison. The 32 convicted former legislators included three sitting members. The city's incumbent vice mayor, Achmad Ru'yat, whom was a member of the legislature between 1999-2004, was detained on 3 August 2010 under suspicion of being involved in this corruption incident. He was acquitted on 8 September 2011.

== Composition ==
For the 2024 legislative election, the legislature will have 50 elected members from 5 electoral districts. The current speaker, Adityawarman Adil of the Prosperous Justice Party, took office on 24 September 2024.

Legislative period	PKS	Golkar	PDI-P	Gerindra	Demokrat	PPP	PKB	PAN	Nasdem	Hanura	PBB	PSI	Total
2009–2014	7	6	6	2	15	3	–	2		3	1		45
2014–2019	5	6	8	6	5	5	1	3	1	4	1		45
2019–2024	10	5	8	8	5	5	3	3	1	1	1	–	50
2024–2029	11	7	6	6	3	3	4	5	4	–	–	1	50
