= Bima Arya Sugiarto =

Indonesian politician

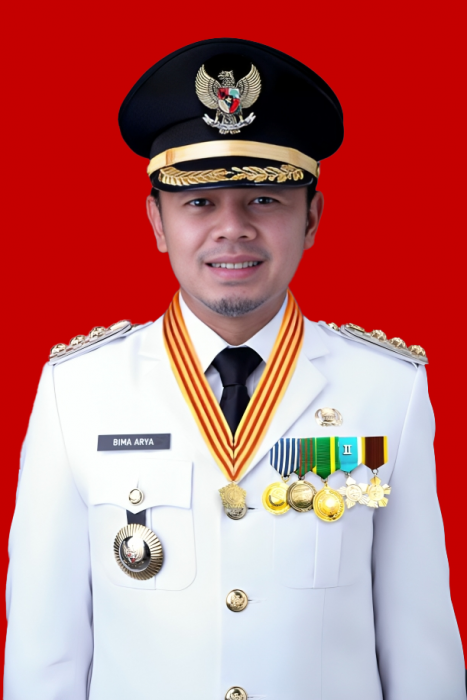

Deputy Minister of Home Affairs
- Incumbent
- Assumed office 21 October 2024 Serving with Ribka Haluk
- President: Prabowo Subianto
- Minister: Tito Karnavian
- Preceded by: John Wempi Wetipo

16th Mayor of Bogor
- In office 7 April 2014 – 20 April 2024
- President: Susilo Bambang Yudhoyono; Joko Widodo
- Governor: Ahmad Heryawan; Ridwan Kamil
- Deputy: Usmar Hariman (2014–2019); Dedie Rachim (2019–2024)
- Preceded by: Diani Budiarto
- Succeeded by: Hery Antasari (act.)

Personal details
- Born: 17 December 1972 (age 53) Bogor, West Java, Indonesia
- Party: National Mandate Party
- Spouse: Yane Ardian
- Children: 2
- Education: Parahyangan Catholic University; Monash University Australian National University

Bima Arya Sugiarto (born 17 December 1972) is an Indonesian politician of the National Mandate Party and the deputy minister of home affairs since October 2024.

== Personal life ==
=== Education ===
After completing high school at SMA Negeri 1 Bogor, he obtained a bachelor's degree in International Relations from Parahyangan Catholic University's Faculty of Politics in 1998. He received a Masters of Arts in Development Studies from Monash University in 2001 and a PhD in Politics from Australian National University in 2006.

=== Family ===
Arya is the eldest son of three siblings. His father, Toni Sugiarto, was a police Brigadier General and member of the People's Representative Council until his death in 1997. His mother, Melinda Susilarini, is a former beauty pageant contestant whose father was the caretaker of Cipanas Palace. Arya married Yane Ardian in 2002. They have two children: a son and a daughter.

== Career ==
Following the May 1998 fall of Suharto, Arya became one of the founders of the National Mandate Party (Partai Amanat Nasional or PAN). Between 1998 and 2001, he was a politics lecturer at Parahyangan Catholic University. Afterwards, he moved to Paramadina University, where he still lectures. He was also a political observer, although he resigned from active position in 2010 due to conflict of interest with his career in PAN.

=== As mayor ===
He ran in Bogor's 2013 mayoral election with Usmar Hariman as deputy, receiving 132,835 votes (33.1%) with the runner-up Ahmad-Aim pair receiving 131,080 (32.7%). His campaign promises included a 100-day program to improve public transport, urban hygiene, bureaucracy and civil administration in addition to the handling of street merchants. Three months into his tenure, he received a second place award from Indonesia Digital Society (behind Surabaya Mayor Tri Rismaharini) due to establishments of online systems for the city. He has also received awards from the Ministry of Health and the National Body of Demographics and Family Planning.

Early in 2015, he established a 24-hour call center for Bogor residents to submit complaints. His leadership has been criticized for perceived lack of performance and perceived intolerance over the prohibition of the Shi'a Ashura celebration, anti-Ahmadiyya sentiments and the continued closure of the GKI Yasmin church.

His name was raised as a possible candidate for deputy governor (paired with Bandung mayor Ridwan Kamil) in the 2018 West Java gubernatorial election, although Arya ruled out running. During a 2014 controversy over a proposed law to scrap direct elections of regional leaders, he was one of the mayors and governors who opposed their party's position, although unlike then-Jakarta governor Basuki Tjahaja Purnama he did not resign from his party. Arya was reelected in the 2018 mayoral election, winning 215,708 votes (43.6%).

During the COVID-19 pandemic, Arya tested positive for the disease following his return from a visit to Turkey and Azerbaijan, and was treated as he showed symptoms.

His second term as mayor ended on 20 April 2024, and he was replaced in an acting capacity by Hery Antasari, head of the provincial government's human development agency. In a farewell speech, Arya endorsed his vice-mayor Dedie Rachim's bid in the 2024 mayoral election. On 4 May 2024, he declared his candidacy for the 2024 West Java gubernatorial election.
