= John Wempi Wetipo =

Indonesian politician

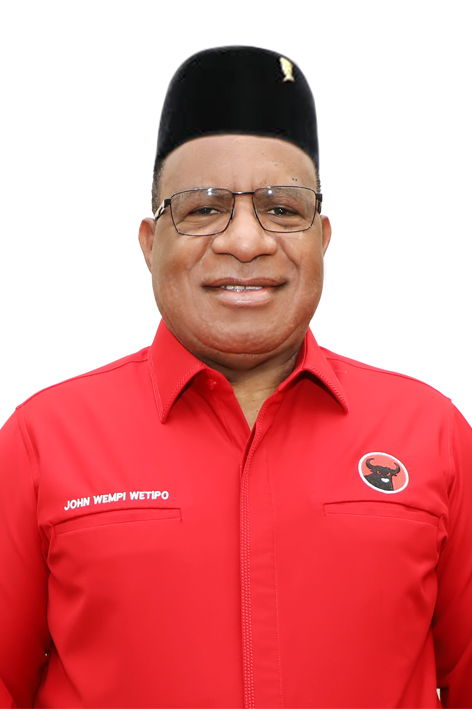

Deputy Minister of Home Affairs
- In office 15 June 2022 – 20 October 2024
- President: Joko Widodo
- Minister: Tito Karnavian
- Succeeded by: Bima Arya Sugiarto; Ribka Haluk

3rd Deputy Minister of Public Works and Housing
- In office 25 October 2019 – 15 June 2022
- President: Joko Widodo
- Minister: Basuki Hadimuljono
- Preceded by: Hermanto Dardak (2009–2014)
- Succeeded by: Diana Kusumastuti; Fahri Hamzah

Regent of Jayawijaya
- In office 18 December 2008 – 18 December 2018
- Preceded by: Nicolas Jigibalom
- Succeeded by: John Richard Banua

Personal details
- Born: 15 September 1972 (age 53) Hulekaima, Jayawijaya, Irian Jaya, Indonesia
- Party: PDI-P

John Wempi Wetipo (born 15 September 1972) is an Indonesian politician from Papua. He is currently serving as Deputy Minister of Home Affairs, being appointed in 2022. Previously he served as Deputy Minister of Public Works and Housing from 2019 until 2022 and as the Regent of Jayawijaya Regency for two terms between 2008 and 2018. He participated in the 2018 Papua gubernatorial election, but lost to incumbent Lukas Enembe.

== Background ==
He was born on 15 September 1972 in the kampung of Hulekaima in the Maima district of Jayawijaya Regency. Coming from the Dani tribe, he is the only son of Habel Wetipo and did his basic education in missionary schools. Later, he moved to Jayapura for his highschool. After completing basic education, he studied for 3 years in Manado's Tourism Academy. Later, he graduated from a bachelor's and a master's program at Cenderawasih University.

== Career ==
Wetipo began working as a civil servant in 1996, and later became the head of the tourism agency for the regency. He later participated in the regency's first direct election in 2008 and won, being sworn in on 24 December 2008.

As regent, Wetipo initiated the Baliem Valley Cultural Festival, intended to draw tourists to the otherwise remote regency. He received an award from the Corruption Eradication Commission for wealth reporting and from the Ministry of Finance for financial management in Jayawijaya. He was reelected in 2013 with over 91 percent of the votes.

In 2018, Wetipo ran for the governorship of Papua. During the proceedings, he was accused of falsifying his degree, but the KPU rejected the suit. He would lose to incumbent Lukas Enembe, securing only 32.5 percent of the votes. After the results were announced, Wetipo went to the Constitutional Court, but his case was rejected.

Wetipo was appointed as the Deputy Minister for Public Works of Housing under the Onward Indonesia Cabinet of Joko Widodo's second term. On Joko Widodo's 4th ministerial reshuffle, Wetipo is reappointed as Deputy Minister of Home Affairs on 15 June 2022.
