= Diani Budiarto =

Indonesian politician

15th Mayor of Bogor
- In office 7 April 2004 – 7 April 2014
- Preceded by: Iswara Natanegara
- Succeeded by: Bima Arya Sugiarto

Personal details
- Born: 14 January 1955 (age 70); Bandung, West Java, Indonesia

Diani Budiarto (born 14 January 1955) is an Indonesian former politician who served as the mayor of Bogor between 2004 and 2014.

== Career ==
Budiarto was elected as Mayor of Bogor following a vote in the city council on 14 January 2004, and he was sworn in on 7 April 2004. In 2008, he was reelected as mayor in the direct election, winning 63.84% of the votes.

=== Yasmin church ===
In 2006, Budiarto had issued a building permit for an Indonesian Christian Church in Bogor's Yasmin Park neighborhood, or GKI Yasmin. However, in April 2010, the city government sealed the church, alleging that documents related to the building permit had been falsified. In October, as the congregation used the building to conduct a service, officers of the city's municipal police dismissed the gathering. In an interview with Tempo, Budiarto denied accusations of religious discrimination, pointing out that building permits for another church had been issued without any incident and construction had commenced elsewhere in Bogor at the time. He also pointed out that he had offered alternate locations for the church's congregation to conduct services.

During the ensuing legal battle, the Supreme Court of Indonesia ruled that the sealing and the revocation of the permit was illegal, and ordered for the church to be reopened. Budiarto, however, defied the court order, resulting in lawmakers calling him unfit for office, and the Indonesian Ombudsman accusing him of treason. In May 2012, he stated that he would allow the church to be reopened if a mosque was built next to it.

== Personal life ==
Budiarto practices polygamy, having been divorced with his first wife before remarrying a woman he knew from his studies. He later had a third marriage in 2004, as he was running for the mayoral office, and had his fourth marriage (i.e. third wife) in 2011.
