= Achmad Adnawidjaja =

Indonesian military officer, bureaucrat and politician

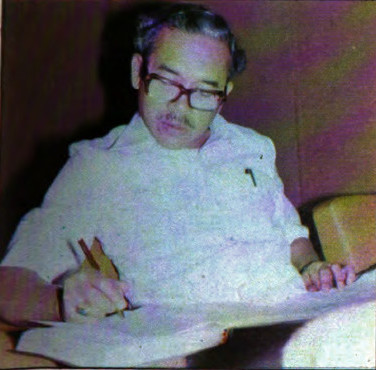

Member of the People's Representative Council
- In office 1 October 1982 – 1 October 1987
- President: Suharto
- Parliamentary group: Golkar
- Constituency: Subang

Director General of General Government and Regional Autonomy
- In office 29 August 1980 – 1 October 1982
- President: Suharto
- Preceded by: Prapto Prajitno
- Succeeded by: Eddy Sabara

Head of the Research and Development Body of the Department of Home Affairs
- In office 1975 – 29 August 1980
- President: Suharto
- Preceded by: office established
- Succeeded by: Djamaluddin Tambunan

Regional Secretary of West Java
- In office 11 September 1965 – 10 May 1975
- Governor: Mashudi; Solihin G. P. Aang Kunaefi
- Preceded by: ?
- Succeeded by: Kadarusman Kadi

Mayor of Bogor
- In office 1961 – 1 September 1965
- Governor: Mashudi
- Preceded by: Abdul Rachman
- Succeeded by: Achmad Syam

Personal details
- Born: 5 June 1922 Tasikmalaya, West Java
- Party: Golkar
- Spouse: Yayah Malihah
- Children: 10

Military service
- Allegiance: Indonesia
- Branch/service: Army
- Rank: Brigadier General
- Unit: 1945—1975

Achmad Adnawidjaja (born 5 June 1922) was an Indonesian military officer, bureaucrat, and politician who held several offices in provincial and national level of the Indonesian government. His last office was as the member of the People's Representative Council, which he held from 1982 until 1987.

== Early life ==
Achmad was born on 5 June 1922 in Tasikmalaya, West Java. Before entering the military, Achmad was employed as a teacher from 1941 until 1942 and as an alderman from 1943 until 1945.

== Military career ==
Achmad entered the military in 1945, where he fought at the Indonesian National Revolution. After the revolution ended, Achmad became the Deputy Commander of the 312th Battalion (1953), military commander of Bekasi and Tangerang (1953—1955), Commander of the 312th Battalion (1957—1959), Commander of the Bandung Urban Military Command (1959—1960). Achmad retired from the military with the rank of brigadier general on 1 January 1975.

== Bureaucratic career ==
Achmad began his career in governance when he was appointed as the Mayor of Bogor in 1961. He ended his term on 1 September 1965 and was subsequently made as the Regional Secretary of West Java ten days later. After serving as regional secretary for ten years and under three governors, he was replaced by Kadarusman Kadi on 10 May 1975.

Achmad was transferred to the Ministry of Home Affairs shortly afterwards, where he was made as the head of the newly established Research and Development body of the ministry. He was rotated several years later and became the Director General of General Government and Regional Autonomy on 29 August 1980.

== Political career ==
Achmad ran in the 1982 Indonesian legislative election as a candidate for the People's Representative Council. Achmad was elected to the council for a five-year term.

== Personal life ==
Achmad was married to Yayah Malihah. The couple has four sons and six daughters.
