= Prosperous Justice Party =

Prosperous Justice Party Partai Keadilan Sejahtera
- Abbreviation: PKS
- Leader of the Shura Council: Sohibul Iman
- President: Al Muzzammil Yusuf
- Secretary-General: Muhammad Kholid
- DPR group leader: Abdul Kharis Almasyhari
- Founded: 20 July 1998; 28 years ago (as Partai Keadilan); 20 April 2002; 24 years ago (current name)
- Headquarters: Jl. TB Simatupang No. 82 Kel. Pasar Minggu, Kec. Pasar Minggu, South Jakarta, Jakarta 12520
- Newspaper: e-Bulletin IDEOLOGI
- Youth wing: Gema Keadilan (Echo of Justice); Garuda Keadilan (Garuda of Justice); PKS Muda (Young PKS)
- Women's wing: Rumah Keluarga Indonesia (Home of Indonesian Family)
- Membership (2022): 285,828
- Ideology: Pancasila (de jure); Islamism (Note: A 2008 Lowy Institute for International Policy paper suggests that Prosperous Justice Party of Indonesia is post-Islamist.); Islamic fundamentalism; Social conservatism; Islamic nationalism; Economic policy: Islamic economics Reform era 1998: Islamism Reformism
- Political position: Now: Right-wing; Early Reform era 1998: Centre-right to right-wing
- National affiliation: Advanced Indonesia Coalition Plus (2024–present; in government coalition supply) Former: Coalition of Change for Unity; (2023–2024); Just and Prosperous Indonesia Coalition; (2018–2019); Red-White Coalition; (2014–2016); Joint Secretariat; (2009–2014); People's Coalition; (2004–2009); Central Axis; (1999–2004)
- International affiliation: Muslim Brotherhood
- Colours: Orange (since 2020); White; Black (before 2020); Gold
- Slogan: Bersama Melayani Rakyat (Together Serving the People)
- Anthem: Hymne PKS (PKS Hymn); Mars PKS (PKS March)
- Ballot number: 8
- DPR: 53 / 580
- DPRD I: 210 / 2,372
- DPRD II: 1,312 / 17,510

Website
- pks.id

The Prosperous Justice Party (Indonesian: Partai Keadilan Sejahtera, sometimes called the Justice and Prosperity Party, Indonesian name literally translated "Party of Secure/Peaceful Justice"), frequently abbreviated to PKS, and formerly the Justice Party (Indonesian: Partai Keadilan, PK), is an Islamist political party in Indonesia.

PKS is a metamorphosis from the Justice Party (Indonesian: Partai Keadilan, PK) established in 1998. The party was originally influenced by the Muslim Brotherhood movement of Egypt, and considered an Islamist party for its calls for Islam to play a central role in public life, as well as providing political support to Indonesian and international Islamist movements such as the Islamic Defenders Front 212 Movement. Today, it is considered a nationalist Islamist party that conforms with Pancasila doctrine and no longer upholds sharia as a main goal.

== History ==
1999 election Justice Party logo in ballot

PKS logo (2002–2020)

The origin of the party is a religious movement known as Jemaah Tarbiyah, which was influential in university campuses during the 1980s and 1990s. Activists of Jemaah Tarbiyah established the Justice Party, the predecessor of the party on 20 July 1998, with Nurmahmudi Ismail as its first president. The Justice Party was reconstituted as the Prosperous Justice Party in April 2002 after the Justice Party failed to meet the required two percent of electoral threshold in the 1999 election that it needed to contest the 2004 election. During the 2004 legislative elections, the PKS won 7.3% of the popular vote and 45 out of 550 seats, making it the seventh-largest party in parliament. This was a gain from the 1.4% received in 1999. In addition, its leader Hidayat Nur Wahid was elected speaker of the People's Consultative Assembly. PKS's strongest support is in major urban centers, particularly Jakarta, where it won the largest share of seats in 2004. In the 2009 elections, the party's came fourth, its share of the vote rose to 7.88% and it gained 12 extra legislative seats.

After the 2004 Indian Ocean tsunami, PKS sent volunteer relief workers to Aceh, and has been involved in several other relief and reconstruction projects.

Over the years, the party has experienced prolonged internal rivalry, particularly between camps that can be identified as pragmatist on the one hand, and idealist on the other. The pragmatist camp has generally been made up of younger, secular-educated functionaries while older functionaries who often are graduates from institutes in the Middle East make up the idealist camp.

The 5 October 2011 edition of Indonesian TV news program Liputan 6 Petang reported PKS Deputy Secretary-General and member of Indonesia's House of Representatives Fahri Hamzah had recently floated the idea of disbanding Indonesia's Corruption Eradication Commission (Komisi Pemberantasan Korupsi or KPK). According to Kompas, Deputy Chairman of Commission III in House of Representatives was responsible for legal affairs, human rights and security Fahri Hamzah first made the suggestion to disband the Corruption Eradication Commission in a consultation meeting at the House on Monday 3 October 2011.

The party saw rapid successions of party presidents in the 2010s. In 2013, Lutfi Hasan Ishaaq was arrested by the Corruption Eradication Commission due to graft; Anis Matta was chosen to replace him as party president and finally, Taufik Ridho succeeded Matta as secretary general. Taufik Ridho died of medical complications on 6 February 2017 at 52 years of age.

After rejecting State Capital Act (UU IKN) and the Criminal Offense Bill of Sexual Abuses (RUU TPKS) in 2021 and 2022 as well as supporting Suharto as National Hero in 2008, some members of the public called for the dissolution of PKS.

== Political identities ==
=== Views ===
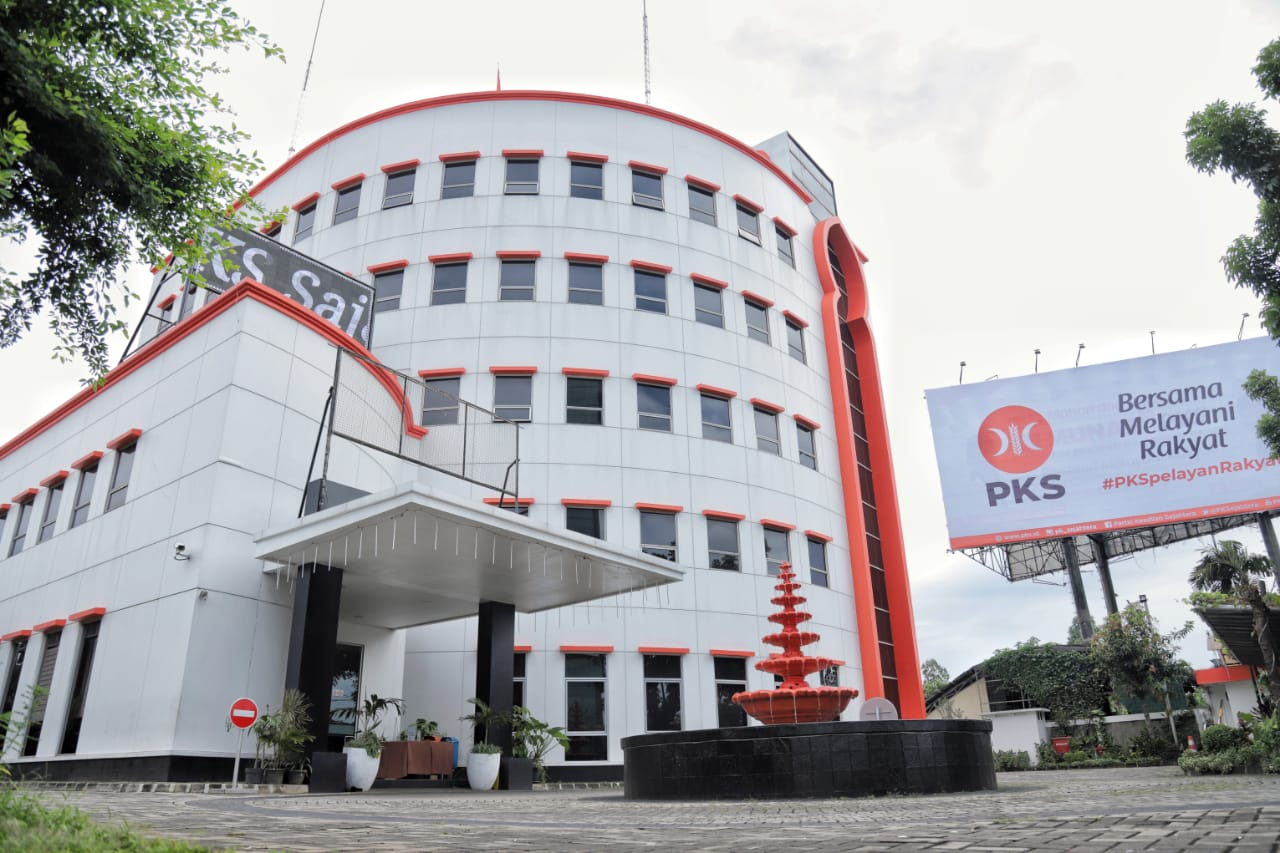
The PKS Central Leadership Council headquarters in South Jakarta

The PKS is known for its public opposition to political corruption; this stance was widely reported as a major factor in the party's increased success in 2004. However, this image has been under attack in recent times, as several alleged cases of grafts are suspected to be connected to several prominent party politicians. The party is closely associated with Islamic teachings, but according to its leadership does not promote the mandatory implementation of sharia, requiring Indonesia's Muslims to follow Islamic law. Many of its campaigns are based on conservative religious teachings, such as opposition to the selling of pornography, and for strict punishments for violations of narcotics laws.

The party has been associated with the Egypt-based Muslim Brotherhood; several of its founders attended Brotherhood-related schools. The organization stages rallies supporting Hamas in its conflict with Israel, and against the influence of the United States both in the Middle East and in Indonesia.

The PKS parliamentary group in the DPR have expressed their opinions on a few issues:

Year	Bills	Votes	Party stances/Other views
2019	Revision of Law on the Corruption Eradication Commission; RUU KPK		
2022	Law on Sexual Violence Crimes; RUU TPKS		
2022	Law on State Capital; RUU IKN		
2022	Revision of the Indonesian Criminal Code; RUU KUHP		PKS urges that the law be comprehensively supported by the UU TPKS which has been passed.
2023	Omnibus Law on Job Creation; RUU Cipta Kerja		

=== Party platform ===
The party's vision is to bring about a civil society that is just, prosperous and dignified.

Its mission is to:

1. Pioneer reforms to the political system, government and the bureaucracy, the judicial system and the military to be committed to strengthening democracy.
2. Address poverty, reduce unemployment and improve the prosperity of all elements of society through a strategy to equalize incomes, high value-added growth and sustained development.
3. Move towards just education by providing the maximum possible opportunities for all the Indonesian people.

== Party figures ==
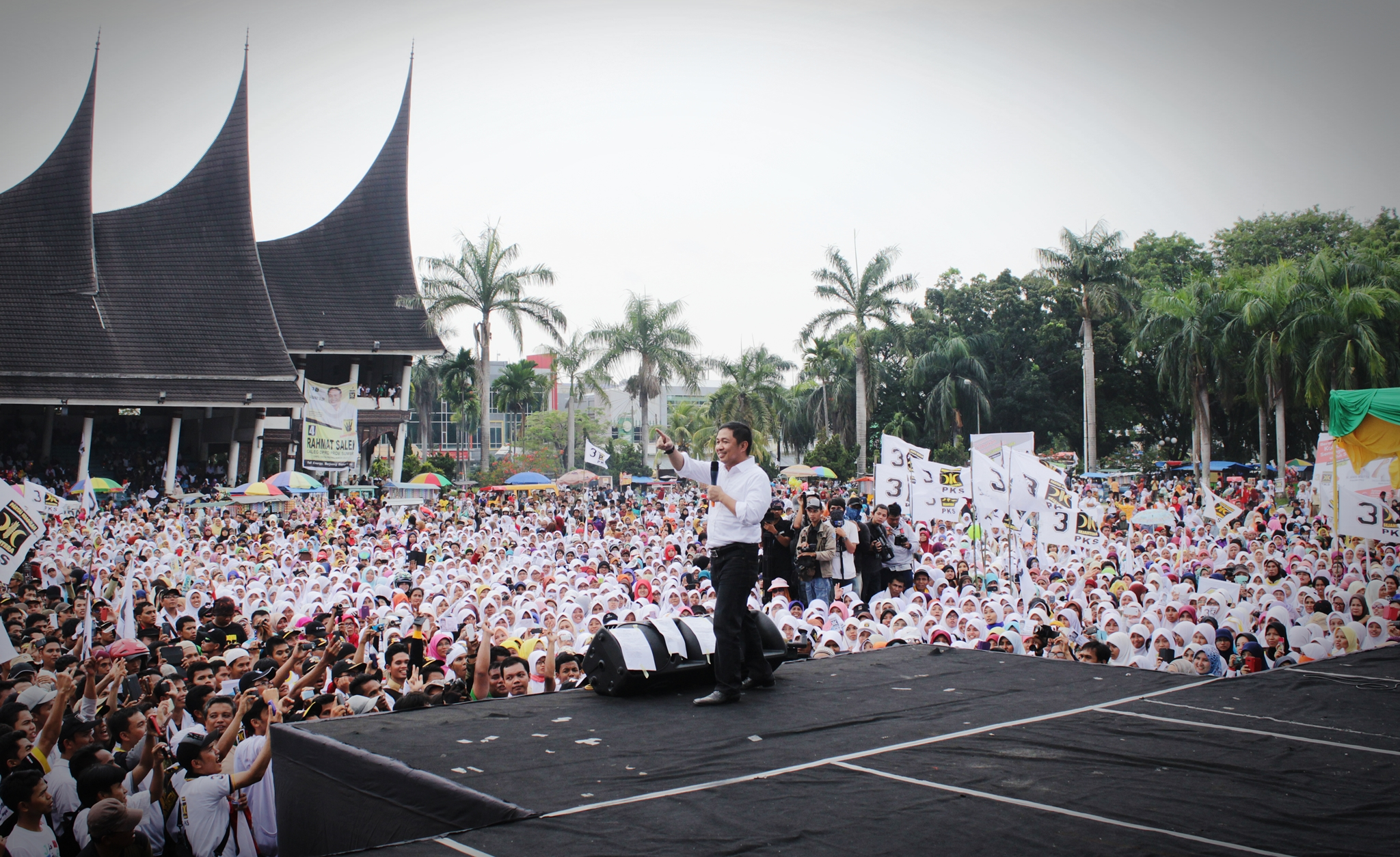
Anis Matta and supporters of the Prosperous Justice Party (PKS) during a campaign that attracted more than 50,000 people ahead of the 9 April 2014 legislative polls in Padang, West Sumatra.

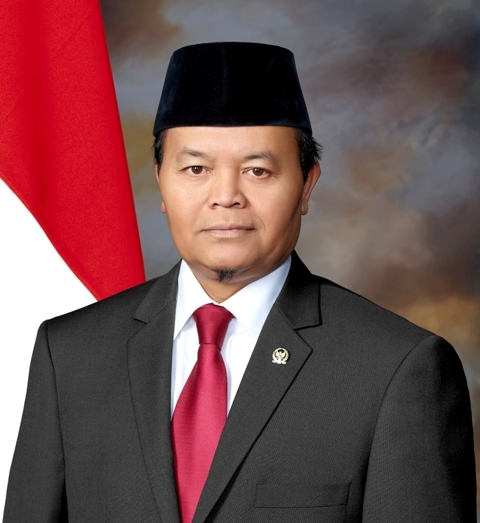
Hidayat Nur Wahid, former president of the Prosperous Justice Party and former chairman of the People's Consultative Assembly.

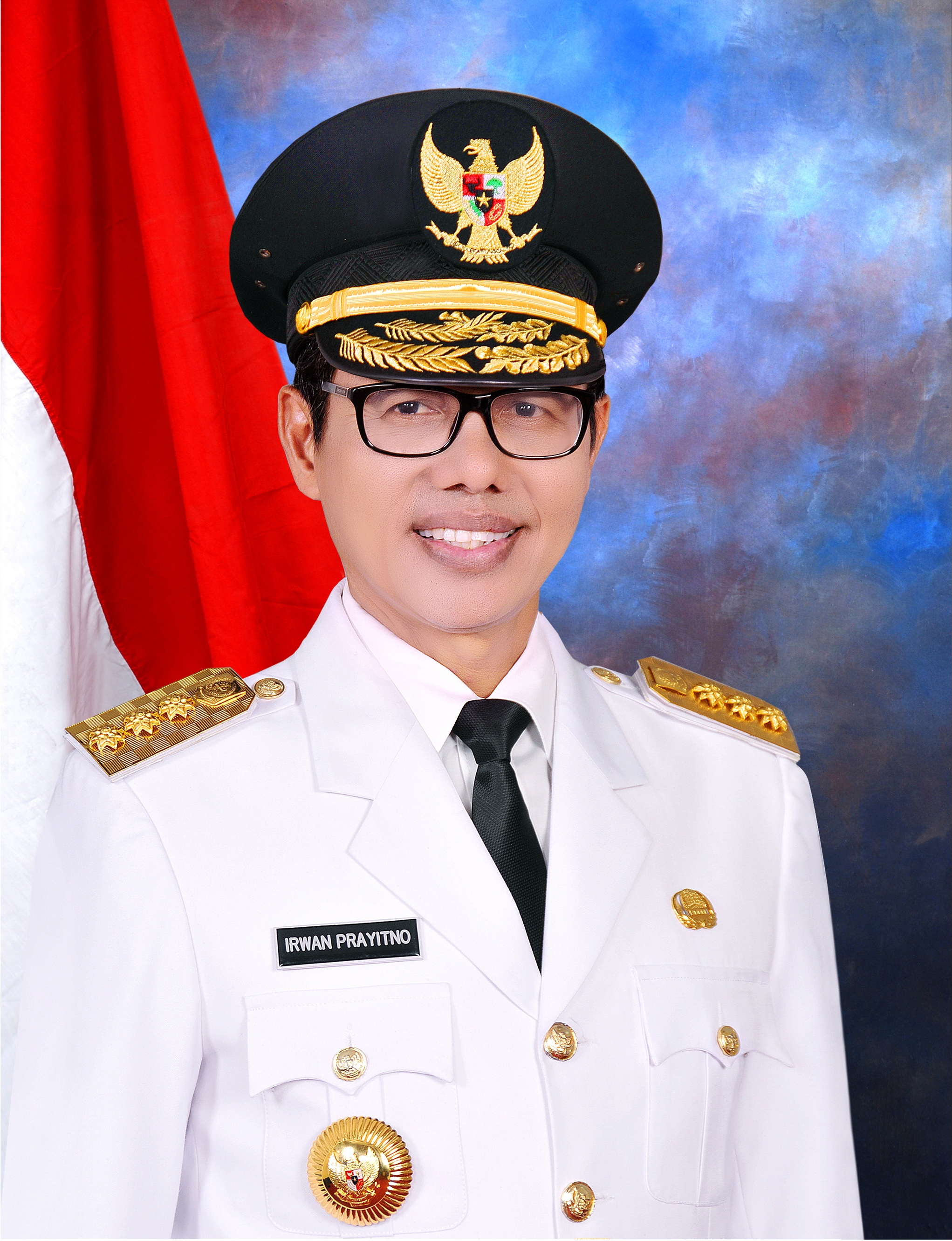
Irwan Prayitno, former governor of West Sumatra.

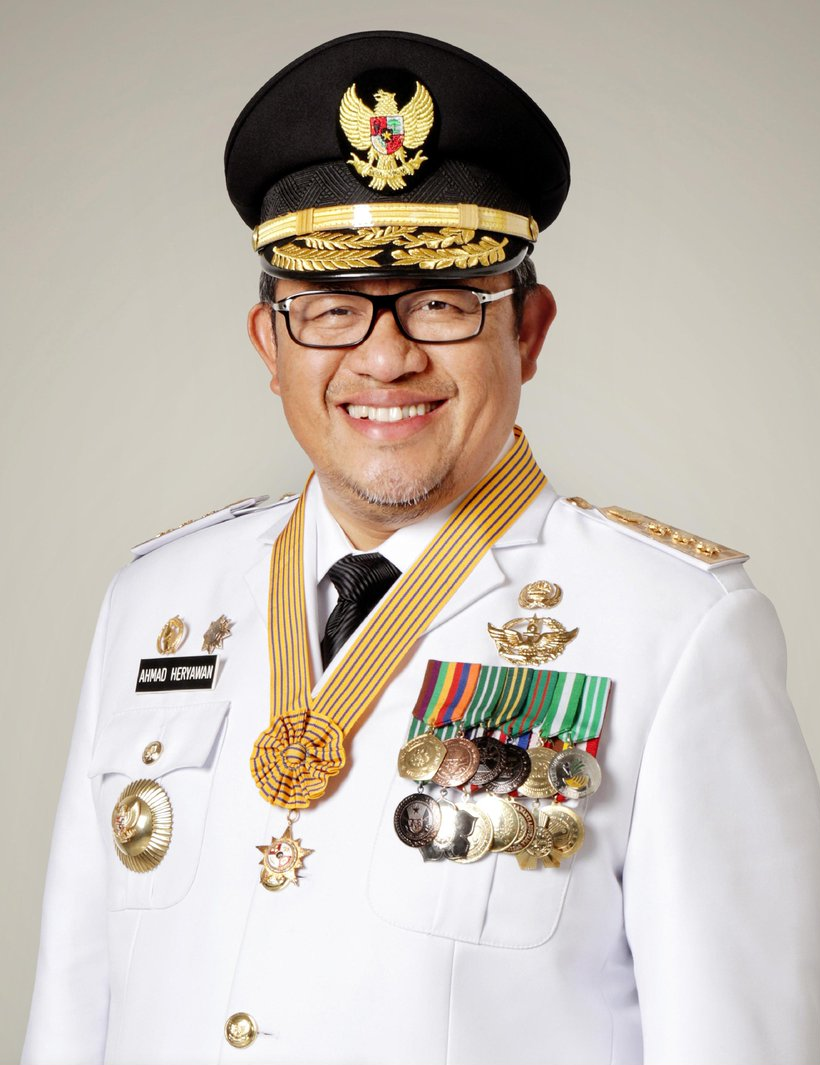
Ahmad Heryawan, former governor of West Java.

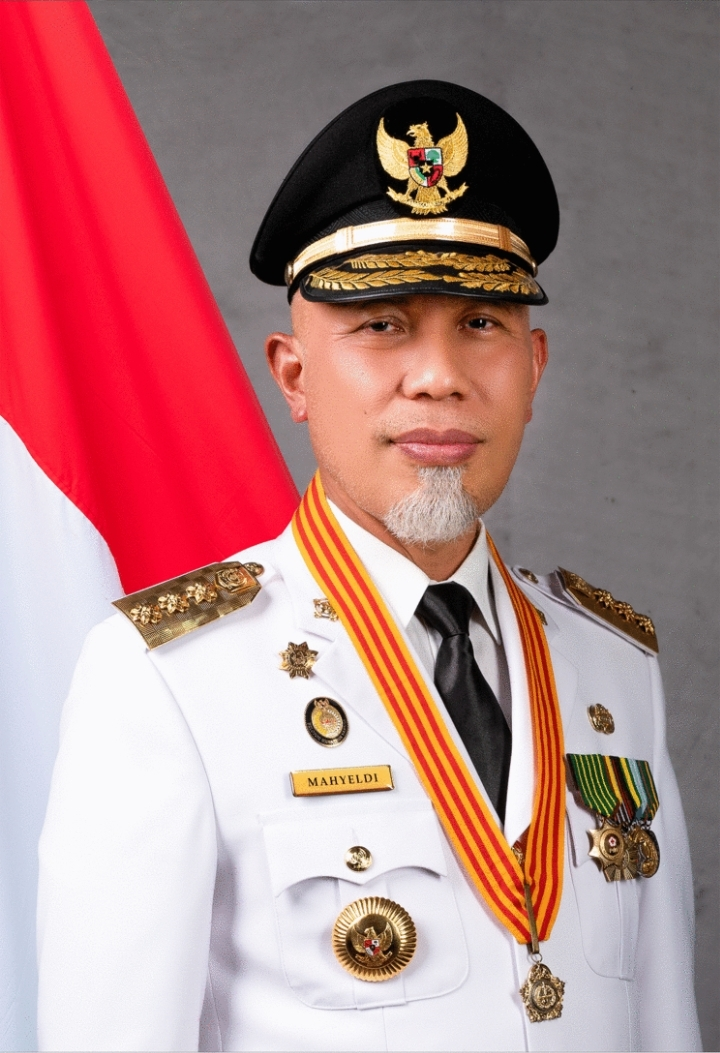
Mahyeldi Ansharullah, governor of West Sumatra.

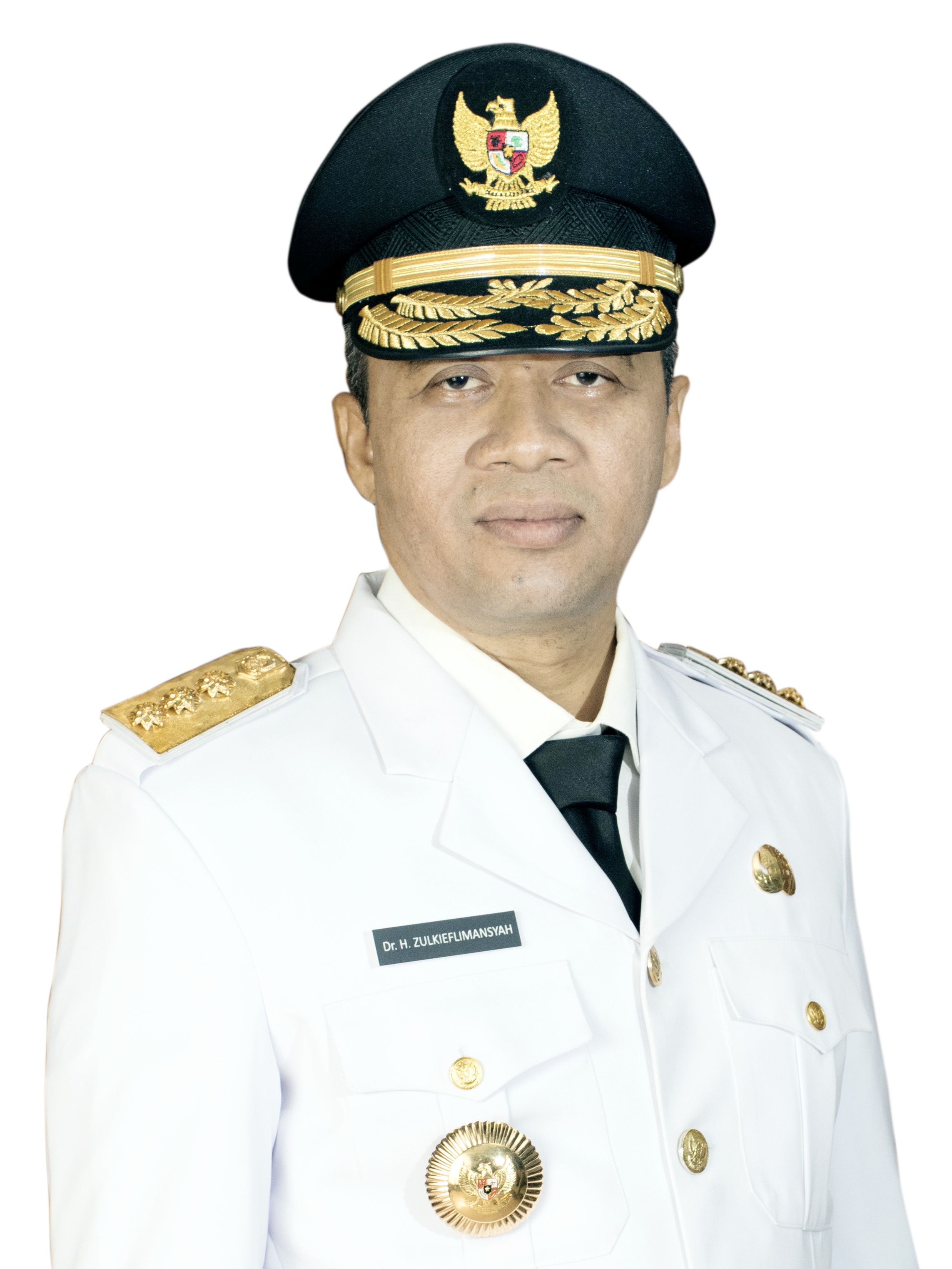
Zulkieflimansyah, former governor of West Nusa Tenggara.

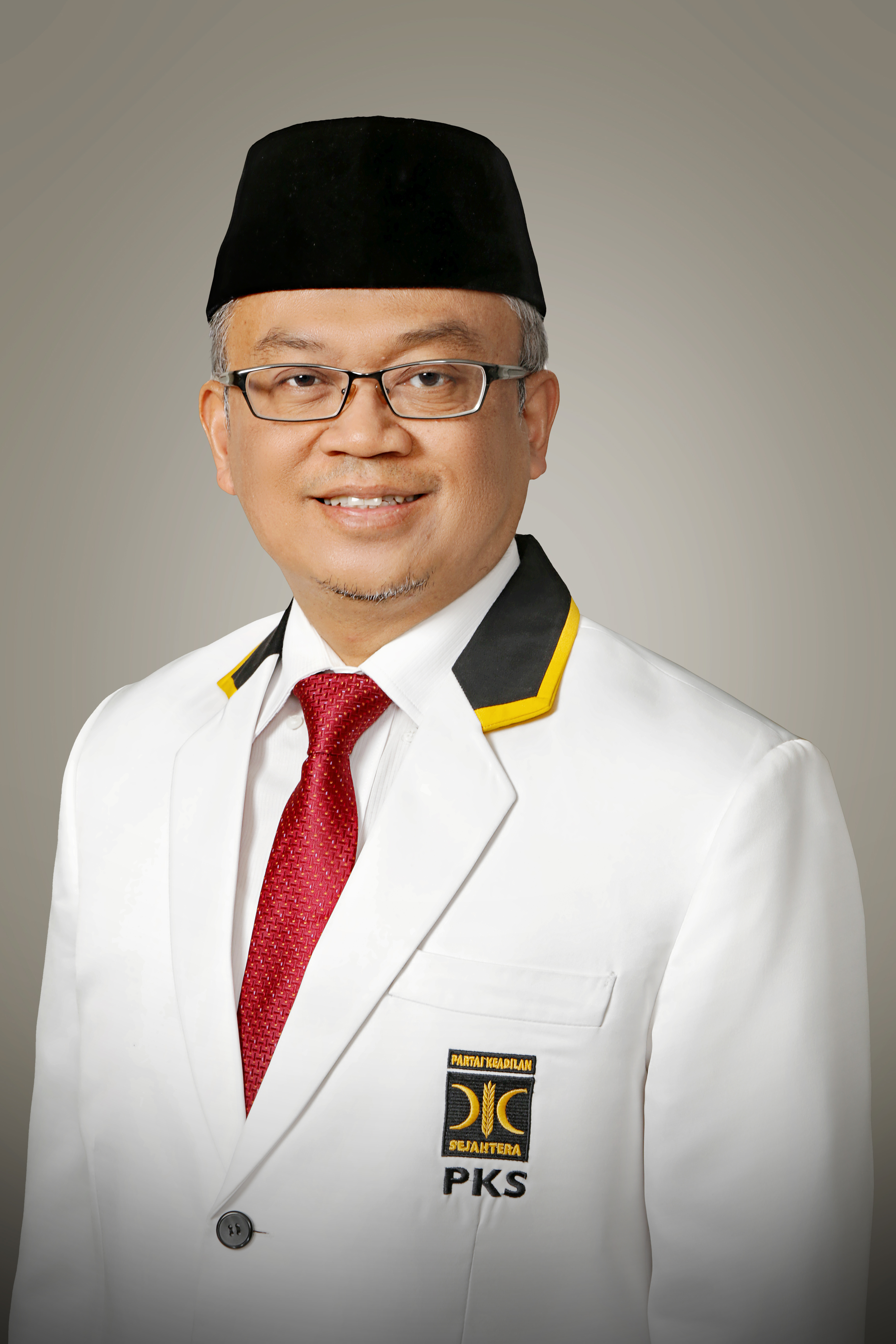
Tate Qomarudin, Member of the Regional People's Representative Council of West Java Province for three terms.

== Controversies ==
=== PKS Watch ===
In 2010, a blog site called PKSWatch appeared which criticized PKS policies and received strong reactions from PKS sympathizers, which then prompted the formation of the PKSWatch blog. This site is not an official PKS site. However, recently this site has not appeared again to the public because it feels there are differences in views with PKS.

=== Forum Kader Peduli ===
Forum Kader Peduli is a forum formed in September 2008 and is declared in Al Hikmah Mampang Prapatan Mosque, where PKS was declared as a political party for the first time. The forum was headed by Yusuf Supendi, one of the founders of the party. However behind Supendi, there are more influential party members such as Syamsul Balda, former vice president of PKS. This forum was intended to "expose" the "ulcers" of high ranking PKS officials at that time.

=== Islamic State Illusion Book ===
On 16 May 2009, a book entitled The Illusion of an Islamic State: Expansion of the Transnational Islamic Movement in Indonesia (Ilusi Negara Islam: ExpansiGerakan Islam Transnasional di Indonesia) was published by The Wahid Institute, the Bhinneka Tunggal Ika Movement, the Maarif Institute, and the Libforall Foundation. The book launch was attended by former president, Abdurrahman Wahid, former General Chair of PP Muhammadiyah, Ahmad Syafii Maarif and Nahdlatul Ulama figure, Mustofa Bisri.

The book generated controversies domestically and internationally as it portrayed PKS and the Indonesian branch of Hizb ut-Tahrir as an International Islamic hardliner movement. In this book, PKS is described as infiltrating state schools and universities and various institutions including government and Islamic community organizations, including Nahdlatul Ulama and Muhammadiyah. This book is claimed to have violated the research code of ethics and some information is difficult to believe, such as the inclusion of Gus Dur as editor, even though at that time he was experiencing visual impairment, to the lawsuit of three IAIN Sunan Kalijaga lecturers because they felt their names had been used as part of the research team.

An English version of the book was released in 2011 under the title, The Illusion of an Islamic State: How an Alliance of Moderates Launched a Successful Jihad Against Radicalization and Terrorism in the World’s Largest Muslim-Majority Country.

=== Openness to Non-muslim Members ===
During their 2008 national working meeting at the Inna Grand Beach Hotel, Sanur, Denpasar, Bali on February 1 2008, some elite members of the party declared PKS as an open party, which means PKS will accept non-Muslim candidates to compete on the party's ticket. However, this statement sparked an internal conflict amongst high ranking party members. The chairman of the Central Sharia Council, Surahman Hidayat, stated that he supports this decision but this decision was fiercely opposed by one of the founders of PK, Yusuf Supendi. He accused the chairman of the Syuro Council, Hilmi Aminuddin, and the secretary general at that time, Anis Matta (whom later become party president) as those who wanted PKS to become an open party.

In the 2nd Mukernas at the Ritz-Carlton Hotel, Jakarta, on June 16 2010, the possibility of non-Muslims sitting on the party management was also discussed. However, to date there has been no realization of this possibility, apart from the existence of several non-Muslim legislative candidates competing using PKS tickets for the 2014 Indonesian legislative general election in Eastern Indonesia electoral districts, such as East Nusa Tenggara, North Sulawesi, Central Sulawesi, West Sulawesi, Papua and West Papua.

=== Allegations of Wahhabism ===
In April 2013, Yenny Wahid, daughter of former president Abdurrahman Wahid, banned cadres of her party, the New Indonesian National Sovereignty Party (PKBIB), which failed to pass KPU verification for the 2014 general election, from joining PKS or PKB. Yenny stated that PKBIB carries the vision of ahlus sunnah wal jamaah, and stated that its cadres should not join parties that do not support this ideology. Responding Yenny's statement, party president Anis Matta states that PKS also carries the same vision and the party fraction leader in the parliament Hidayat Nur Wahid protested Yenny's accusation.

PKS is often accused of being Wahhabi, an Islamic reform movement that does not recognize democratic systems and democratic parties. This issue was directly denied by President Anis Matta, who claimed that PKS did not adhere to any particular sect and opened its membership doors as wide as possible to members of other Islamic organizations.

== Leaders ==
No.	Name	Portrait	Constituency / title	Term of office		Election results
No.	Name	Portrait	Constituency / title	Took office	Left office	Election results
President of the Justice Party (1998–2002)
1	Didin Hafidhuddin (born 1951)		—	20 July 1998	9 July 1999	1998 Unopposed
2	Nur Mahmudi Ismail (born 1961)		Rep for DKI Jakarta (Note: until 29 October 1999); Minister of Forestry and Plantation	9 July 1999	21 May 2000	1999 Unopposed
3	Hidayat Nur Wahid (born 1960)		—	21 May 2000	20 April 2002	2000 Unopposed
President of the Prosperous Justice Party (2002–present)
(3)	Hidayat Nur Wahid (born 1960)		Rep for Jakarta II (Note: since 1 October 2004)	20 April 2002	11 October 2004	2002 Unopposed
–	Tifatul Sembiring (born 1961); Interim leader		Rep for North Sumatera I	11 October 2004	29 May 2005	
4	Tifatul Sembiring (born 1961)		Rep for North Sumatera I	29 May 2005	23 October 2009	2005 Unopposed
–	Luthfi Hasan Ishaaq (born 1961); Interim leader		Rep for East Java V	23 October 2009	20 January 2010	
5	Luthfi Hasan Ishaaq (born 1961)		Rep for East Java V	20 January 2010	1 February 2013	2010 Unopposed
6	Anis Matta (born 1968)		Rep for South Sulawesi I (Note: until 7 February 2013)	1 February 2013	10 August 2015	2013 Unopposed
7	Mohamad Sohibul Iman (born 1965)		Rep for West Java XI (Note: until 7 April 2017)	10 August 2015	5 October 2020	2015 Unopposed
8	Ahmad Syaikhu (born 1965)		Rep for West Java VII (Note: until 24 September 2024)	5 October 2020	20 September 2024	2020 Unopposed
–	Ahmad Heryawan (born 1966); Acting		Rep for West Java II (Note: since 1 October 2024)	20 September 2024	23 November 2024	
9	Al Muzzammil Yusuf (born 1965)		Rep for Lampung I	23 November 2024	Incumbent	2025 Unopposed

== Election results ==
=== Legislative election results ===
Election	Ballot number	Leader	Seats		Total votes	Share of votes	Status
Election	Ballot number	Leader	No.	±	Total votes	Share of votes	Status
1999	24	Nur Mahmudi Ismail	7 / 462		1,436,565	1.36%	Governing coalition (1999–2001)
1999	24	Nur Mahmudi Ismail	7 / 462		1,436,565	1.36%	Opposition (2001–2004)
2004	16	Hidayat Nur Wahid	45 / 550	▲38	8,325,020	7.34%	Governing coalition
2009	8	Tifatul Sembiring	57 / 560	▲12	8,204,946	7.88%	Governing coalition
2014	3	Anis Matta	40 / 560	▼17	8,480,204	6.79%	Opposition
2019	8	Sohibul Iman	50 / 575	▲10	11,493,663	8.21%	Opposition
2024	8	Ahmad Syaikhu	53 / 580	▲3	12,781,241	8.42%	Coalition supply

=== Presidential election results ===
Election	Ballot number	Candidate	Running mate	1st round (Total votes)	Share of votes	Outcome	2nd round (Total votes)	Share of votes	Outcome
2004	3	Amien Rais	Siswono Yudo Husodo	17,392,931	14.66%	Eliminated	Runoff		
2009	2	Susilo Bambang Yudhoyono	Boediono	73,874,562	60.80%	Elected			
2014	1	Prabowo Subianto	Hatta Rajasa	62,576,444	46.85%	Lost			
2019	2	Prabowo Subianto	Sandiaga Uno	68,650,239	44.50%	Lost			
2024	1	Anies Baswedan	Muhaimin Iskandar	40,971,906	24.95%	Lost			

Note: Bold text indicates the party member

== List of deputy speakers of the People's Representative Council from PKS ==
#	Portrait	Deputy speaker	Assumed office	Left office	Time in office	Serving with	Speaker	Term
1		Anis Matta	1 October 2009	1 February 2013	3 years, 123 days	P. B. Santoso	Marzuki Alie	16
1		Anis Matta	1 October 2009	1 February 2013	3 years, 123 days	Pramono Anung	Marzuki Alie	16
1		Anis Matta	1 October 2009	1 February 2013	3 years, 123 days	M. Mintohardjono (2009–2010)	Marzuki Alie	16
1		Anis Matta	1 October 2009	1 February 2013	3 years, 123 days	Taufik Kurniawan (2010–2013)	Marzuki Alie	16
2		Sohibul Iman	1 February 2013	1 October 2014	1 year, 242 days	P. B. Santoso	Marzuki Alie	16
2		Sohibul Iman	1 February 2013	1 October 2014	1 year, 242 days	Pramono Anung	Marzuki Alie	16
2		Sohibul Iman	1 February 2013	1 October 2014	1 year, 242 days	Taufik Kurniawan	Marzuki Alie	16
3		Fahri Hamzah	2 October 2014	1 October 2019	4 years, 364 days	Fadli Zon	Setya Novanto (2014–2015)	17
3		Fahri Hamzah	2 October 2014	1 October 2019	4 years, 364 days	Agus Hermanto	Fadli Zon (Acting) (2015–2016)	17
3		Fahri Hamzah	2 October 2014	1 October 2019	4 years, 364 days	Taufik Kurniawan	Ade Komarudin (2016)	17
3		Fahri Hamzah	2 October 2014	1 October 2019	4 years, 364 days	Taufik Kurniawan	Setya Novanto (2016–2017)	17
3		Fahri Hamzah	2 October 2014	1 October 2019	4 years, 364 days	Taufik Kurniawan	Fadli Zon (Acting) (2017–2018)	17
3		Fahri Hamzah	2 October 2014	1 October 2019	4 years, 364 days	Utut Adianto (2018–2019)	Bambang Soesatyo (2018–2019)	17

Colour key

Party of Functional Groups (Golkar) Indonesian Democratic Party of Struggle (PDI-P) National Mandate Party (PAN)
Democratic Party (Demokrat) Great Indonesia Movement Party (Gerindra)

== See also ==
- List of Islamic political parties
- Indonesia People's Wave Party
- Politics of Indonesia
