= Buol =

Buol may refer to:

- Buol Island, Indonesia
- Buol (city), Indonesia
- Buol (village), Indonesia
- Buol Regency, Indonesia
- Buol language, a language in the Gorontalo-Mongondow languages group
- Persbul Buol, an Indonesian football (soccer) club

== People with the surname ==
- Rudolf von Buol-Berenberg (1842-1902), German judge and politician, president of German Reichstag
- Karl Rudolf Graf von Buol-Schauenstein (1760–1833), Bishop of Chur, Switzerland
- Count Karl Ferdinand von Buol (1797–1865), Austrian diplomat and politician
- Peter Buol (1873–1939), the first mayor of Las Vegas, Nevada (1911–1913)

== See also ==
- Buol, Indonesia (disambiguation)
- Bwool (disambiguation)
- Boeol (disambiguation)
- Bul (disambiguation)
- Buol-Berenberg
