= Buol, Indonesia =

Buol, Indonesia, may refer to:

- Buol Island
- Buol (town)
- Buol (village)
- Buol Regency

== See also ==
- Buol (disambiguation)
