= Abdul Karim Hanggi =

Indonesian politician and civil servant

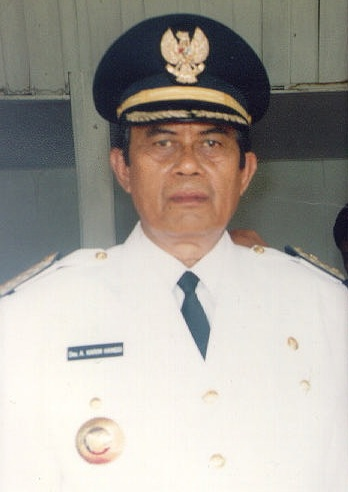
- Hanggi as regent, c. 2000

Member of the House of Representatives
- In office 1 October 1997 – 1 October 1999
- Constituency: Central Sulawesi

1st Regent of Buol
- In office 2000 (Note: Acting regent until 2002.)–2007
- Preceded by: Abdul Karim Mbouw (act.)
- Succeeded by: Amran Batalipu

Personal details
- Born: 27 January 1944 Buol, Dutch East Indies
- Died: 17 January 2025 (aged 80) Buol, Central Sulawesi, Indonesia

Abdul Karim Hanggi (27 January 1944 – 17 January 2025) was an Indonesian politician and civil servant from Buol, Central Sulawesi. As a member of Golkar, he served in the House of Representatives between 1997 and 1999, before becoming the first regent of Buol between 2000 and 2007.

== Early life ==
Hanggi was born on 27 January 1944 at the village of Kulango, in Biau district of present-day Buol Regency. He was trained as a pharmacist, receiving a degree from Hasanuddin University in Makassar in 1977.

== Career ==
His career in government was based in Central Sulawesi's provincial government. By July 1991, he had been appointed as head of the Food and Drug Authority office of the province in Palu, where he would serve until his appointment as a member of the House of Representatives (DPR) from Golkar in 1997. During his time as a DPR member, Hanggi worked on a bill regulating foreign exchanges, and pushed for an investigation of the Bank Bali scandal.

In October 1999, Buol Regency was split off as a new regency, with Abdul Karim Mbouw becoming its first regent. However, Mbouw died on 10 February 2000, leading the Minister of Home Affairs to appoint Hanggi as the new acting regent. The newly formed Regional House of Representatives of Buol proceeded to elect Hanggi as Buol's first definitive regent in 2002 with Ali Nouk elected as his vice regent.

Hanggi was succeeded by Amran Batalipu following Buol's 2007 regency election. During Batalipu's tenure, Hanggi would call for an investigation into municipal finances after some irregularities were found.

=== Post-regency ===
After the end of his tenure in Buol, Hanggi ran for a third term in DPR as a member of Hanura in the 2009 election. He won 22,064 votes, but failed to secure Hanura's sole seat from Central Sulawesi which instead went to Sarifuddin Sudding.

In 2013, he was appointed by Central Sulawesi's governor Longki Djanggola as president commissioner of the provincial government-owned bank Bank Sulteng. The appointment caused some issues with Bank Indonesia due to Hanggi's lack of financial experience during his fit and proper test, but his appointment ultimately passed. He served in this position until 2021. During the campaign period for the 2024 Central Sulawesi gubernatorial election, Hanggi endorsed the Ahmad Ali–Abdul Karim Aljufri ticket.

== Death ==
Hanggi died on 17 January 2025 at the Buol Central Regional Hospital. Prior to his death, he had been generally sickly for around five years, and his death followed four days of treatment. He was buried the following day at his home village in Kulango, in a ceremony attended by around 800 people.

A planned new university in Buol, which began preparations to open in 2025, was named after him.
