= Banten II (electoral district) =

- Electoral district constituency for the House of Representatives
- District: List: Regencies : Serang Regency; Cities : Serang; Cilegon
- Province: Banten
- Population: 2,852,453 (2023)
- Electorate: 2,059,041 (2024)

Current constituency
- Created: 2004
- Seats: 6
- Member: Annisa Maharani Alzahra Mahesa (Gerindra) Sarifah Ainun Jariyah (PDI-P) Tubagus Haerul Jaman (Golkar) Furtasan Ali Yusuf (NasDem) Jazuli Juwaini (PKS) Edison Sitorus (PAN)
- Created from: West Java

Banten II is an electoral district in Indonesia which encompasses the cities of Serang and Cilegon, along with Serang Regency. It currently sends six members to the People's Representative Council.

== Summary ==
For the 2004 election, Serang Regency and Cilegon were part of the Banten I electoral district, while Banten II comprised Tangerang City and Tangerang Regency. (Note: Serang city was split off from Serang Regency in 2007.) In 2009, Tangerang was redesignated into Banten III, while Banten II was assigned to Cilegon, Serang, and Serang Regency. The new Banten II electoral district was assigned 6 seats.

== Components ==
- 2004–2009: Tangerang, Tangerang Regency
- 2009–present: Serang, Cilegon, Serang Regency

== List of representatives ==
The following list is in alphabetical order. Party with the largest number of members is placed on top of the list.

Election	Member	Party
2004	Budiarsa Sastrawinata	Golkar
2004	Ebby Djauharie	Golkar
2004	Dharmono K. Lawi	PDI-P
2004	Wowo Ibrahim	PDI-P
2004	Jazuli Juwaini	PKS
2004	Zulkieflimansyah	PKS
2004	Abdillah Toha	PAN
2004	Ade Daud Iswandi	PBR
2004	Denny Sultani Hasan	Democratic
2004	Idiel Suryadi	PPP
2004	Yusuf Emir Faisal	PKB
2009	Hikmat Tomet	Golkar
2009	Tubagus Iman Ariyadi (2009–2010) (Note: Resigned to run as mayor of Cilegon.); Humaedi (2010–2014)	Golkar
2009	Adiyaman Amir Saputra (2009–2013) (Note: Died in office.); Ahmad Rifai Sufyadi (2013–2014)	PAN
2009	Murdaya Poo (2009–2009) (Note: Removed by his party.); Ichsan Soelistio (2010–2014)	PDI-P
2009	Rusli Ridwan	PAN
2009	Zulkieflimansyah	PKS
2014	Desmond Junaidi Mahesa	Gerindra
2014	Ichsan Soelistio	PDI-P
2014	Kartika Yudhisti	PPP
2014	Yandri Susanto	PAN
2014	Yayat Yulmaryatmo Biaro	Golkar
2014	Zulkieflimansyah (2014–2018) (Note: Resigned to run in the 2018 West Nusa Tenggara gubernatorial election.); Ei Nurul Khotimah (2018–2019)	PKS
2019	Desmond Junaidi Mahesa (2019–2023) (Note: Died in office.); Durrotun Nafisah (2024)	Gerindra
2019	Ichsan Soelistio	PDI-P
2019	Nuraeni	Democratic
2019	Tubagus Haerul Jaman	Golkar
2019	Yandri Susanto	PAN
2019	Jazuli Juwaini	PKS
