= Bwool =

Bwool may refer to:

- Buol (city), Indonesia
- Buol (village), Indonesia

== See also ==
- Bwool (disambiguation)
