= Amran Batalipu =

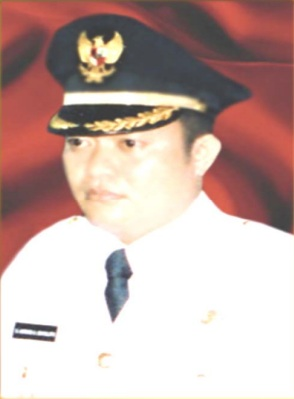
- Batalipu as regent

2nd Regent of Buol
- In office 2007–2012
- Preceded by: Abdul Karim Hanggi
- Succeeded by: Amirudin Rauf

Personal details
- Born: 14 January 1969 (age 57) Buol, Central Sulawesi, Indonesia
- Party: Nasdem

Amran Abdullah Batalipu (born 14 January 1969) is an Indonesian politician who served as the regent of Buol, Central Sulawesi from 2007 to 2012. He had previously been speaker of Buol's local legislature from 2002 to 2007. In July 2012, he was arrested by the Corruption Eradication Commission and sentenced to prison for corruption over agricultural land concessions. Following his release, he re-entered politics and became a member of the Nasdem Party.

== Early life and family ==
Batalipu was born on 14 January 1969 at Bongo, in present-day Buol Regency of Central Sulawesi. His family is well-established in the local politics of Buol, with family members in major bureaucratic or political positions within the regency e.g. his wife Luciana Batalipu (a high-ranking civil servant) and cousin Abdullah Batalipu (formerly chairman of the local legislature). Tempo in 2012 listed eleven of Batalipu's relatives in the Buol regency government.

== Career ==
=== Buol politics ===
Batalipu was elected as a member of the municipal legislature (DPRD) of Buol Toli-Toli Regency after the 1999 election, and when Buol Regency was split off, he joined its new DPRD and became its first speaker in 2002. He would be reelected in the 2004 election and retained his speakership. During his tenure as a DPRD member, he was investigated for a corruption case (which also involved 17 other DPRD members), but was ultimately found not guilty.

In 2007, Buol held its first direct regency election, with Golkar-backed Batalipu taking part and winning the election after securing 18,546 votes (28.1%). During his term as regent, Batalipu eliminated the administrative fees for civil documents (ID cards and birth certificates) and worked to reduce illiteracy. He contested the 2012 election for a second term, but was defeated by Amirudin Rauf.

On 6 July 2012, Batalipu was arrested by the Corruption Eradication Commission (KPK) at his home in Buol. He was being investigated for a corruption case involving the concession of 4,500 hectares of land to be used for a plantation to private businessman Siti Hartati Murdaya. In February 2013, he was found guilty of having received Rp 3 billion in bribes to issue the concessions and was sentenced to 7 years and 6 months of prison by the Jakarta High Court. In 2017, he was further sentenced to 8 years in prison by the Supreme Court of Indonesia for a separate corruption case involving the 2010 municipal budget.

=== Post-release ===
In 2022, he was released after serving just under ten years in prison, with his sentence being reduced by a remission. By January 2023, he had joined the Nasdem Party, and the following year he was elected the party's chairman in Buol. As Nasdem's local chairman, he headed the campaign team of his son Agris Dwi Putra's bid for Buol's 2024 regency election. In 2025, he filed a police report against two former municipal employees for defamation.
