= Biau =

District of Central Sulawesi, Indonesia

- District
- Interactive map of Biau
- Location Biau (Indonesia)
- Coordinates: 1°10′21.9144″N 121°25′21.324″E
- Country: Indonesia
- Province: Central Sulawesi
- Regency: Buol

Area
  - Total: 153.10 km^{2} (59.11 sq mi)

Population (2023)
  - Total: 10,267
  - Density: 67.061/km^{2} (173.69/sq mi)
- Time zone: UTC+8 (ICT)
- Regional code: 72.05.06
- Villages: 7

Biau is a district in Buol Regency, Central Sulawesi, Indonesia. As of 2023, it was inhabited by 10,267 people, and has the total area of 153.10 km^{2}.

== Geography ==
Biau district is divided into 7 urban villages (kelurahan), namely:

- Buol
- Kali
- Leok II
- Leok I
- Kumaligon
- Kulango
- Bugis
