= Amirudin Rauf =

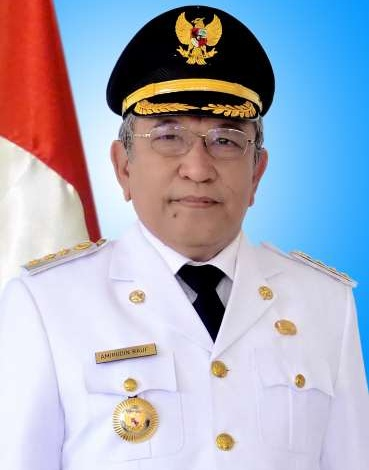
- Rauf as regent of Buol

3rd Regent of Buol
- In office 10 October 2012 – 12 October 2022
- Preceded by: Amran Batalipu
- Succeeded by: Mukhlis Yojodolo (act.); Risharyudi Triwibowo

Personal details
- Born: 1 December 1958 (age 67) Donggala, Central Sulawesi, Indonesia
- Party: Demokrat

Amirudin Rauf (born 1 December 1958) is an Indonesian physician and politician of the Democratic Party. He served as the regent of Buol, Central Sulawesi for two terms between 2012 and 2022. Prior to entering politics, he worked in the hospitals and clinics in Buol and Palu.

== Early life ==
Amirudin Rauf was born in Donggala Regency of Central Sulawesi on 1 December 1958. He studied for a time in Buol, completing elementary and middle school there. He then studied medicine and obtained his bachelor's from Hasanuddin University in 1985. Later, he would receive his specialist degree from Hasanuddin in 1998, in obstetrics and gynaecology.

== Career ==
After graduating from Hasanuddin in 1985, Rauf began to work as head of a puskesmas in Bunobogu district, then another puskesmas in Biau district, both in Buol. In 1990, he was appointed director of Buol's public hospital, and later in 2009 he was appointed head of Palu's Undata Hospital.

Rauf took part in Buol's 2012 regency election with Samsuddin Koloi as his running mate. In the three-way election, Rauf and Koloi won 36,436 votes (48.8%), defeating incumbent regent Amran Batalipu (who was facing corruption charges). Rauf was sworn in as regent on 10 October 2012. Rauf was reelected after the 2017 regency election, winning 36,108 votes (46.8%).

As regent, Rauf announced in 2014 that oil palm companies would not be permitted to receive concessions in Buol, and that any oil palm plantations would be centered around smallholder plasma plantations. To support small plantations, Rauf provided 2 hectares of land for landless farmers in Buol. In 2018, the Ministry of Environment and Forestry granted a 9,964-hectare concession of central government-managed forest for oil palm plantations in Buol, resulting in pushback from both Buol's locals and Rauf. He would inaugurate a palm oil processing plant in Buol days before the end of his term. By that time, a little over 1,000 hectares of land had been distributed ot landless farmers at no cost from Buol's municipal government.

After his tenure as regent ended on 12 October 2022, he was replaced in Buol by Mukhlis Yojodolo in an acting capacity. Rauf resumed medical practice, and in 2023 he was elected head of Central Sulawesi's association of gynecologists and obstreticians. He ran unsuccessfully for a seat in the House of Representatives in the 2024 election, obtaining 7,462 votes as a Democratic Party candidate.

== Personal life ==
Rauf is married to Sri Djawiah Rioeh.
