= Banten III (electoral district) =

Electoral district in Indonesia

- Electoral district constituency for the House of Representatives
- District: List: Regencies : Tangerang Regency; Cities : Tangerang; South Tangerang
- Province: Banten

Current constituency
- Seats: 10
- Members: Ananta Wahana (PDI-P); Marinus Gea (PDI-P); Rano Karno (PDI-P); Martina (Gerindra); Sufmi Dasco Ahmad (Gerindra); Muhammad Rizal (PAN); Andi Achmad Dara (Golkar); Mulyanto (PKS); Rano Alfath (PKB); Zulfikar Hamonangan (Demokrat)
- Created from: Banten II

Banten III is an electoral district in Indonesia which encompasses the cities of Tangerang and South Tangerang, along with Tangerang Regency. It currently sends 10 members to the House of Representatives.

== Summary ==
For the 2004 Indonesian legislative election, the city and regency of Tangerang were counted as a single electoral district, as Banten II which had 11 representatives. In 2009, Tangerang was redesignated into Banten III, and the number of seats was reduced to 10, while Banten II was assigned to Cilegon, Serang, and Serang Regency.

In the 2024 Indonesian legislative election, it is considered one of the most competitive electoral districts, with two former governors of Banten running for a seat.

== Components ==
- 2009–present: Tangerang Regency, Tangerang City, South Tangerang

== List of members ==
The following list is in alphabetical order. Party with the largest number of members is placed on top of the list.

Election	Member	Party
2009	Ferrari Romawi	Demokrat
2009	Himmatul Alyah Setiawaty	Demokrat
2009	Hartanto Edhie Wibowo	Demokrat
2009	Jazuli Juwaini	PKS
2009	Yoyoh Yusroh (2009–2011) (Note: Died in office.); Indra (2011–2014)	PKS
2009	Ahmed Zaki Iskandar (2009–2012) (Note: Resigned to run as regent of Tangerang.); Ebrown Lubuk (2013–2014)	Golkar
2009	Budi Heryadi	Gerindra
2009	Iqbal Alan Abdullah	Hanura
2009	Irgan Chairul Mahfiz	PPP
2009	Irvansyah	PDI-P
2014	Marinus Gea	PDI-P
2014	Herdian Koosnadi (Note: Not sworn in after being made a suspect in a corruption case.); Eddy Kusuma Wijaya (2016–2019)	PDI-P
2014	Ali Taher	PAN
2014	Andi Achmad Dara	Golkar
2014	Hartanto Edhie Wibowo	Demokrat
2014	Inas Nasrullah Zubir	Hanura
2014	Irgan Chairul Mahfiz	PPP
2014	Jazuli Juwaini	PKS
2014	Siti Masrifah	PKB
2014	Sufmi Dasco Ahmad	Gerindra
2019	Ananta Wahana	PDI-P
2019	Marinus Gea	PDI-P
2019	Rano Karno	PDI-P
2019	Martina	Gerindra
2019	Sufmi Dasco Ahmad	Gerindra
2019	Ali Taher (2019–2021) (Note: Died in office.); Muhammad Rizal (2021–2024)	PAN
2019	Andi Achmad Dara	Golkar
2019	Mulyanto	PKS
2019	Rano Alfath	PKB
2019	Zulfikar Hamonangan	Demokrat
