= 2024 Central Sulawesi gubernatorial election =

- 27 November 2024
- Turnout: 72.94% (▼0.97pp)
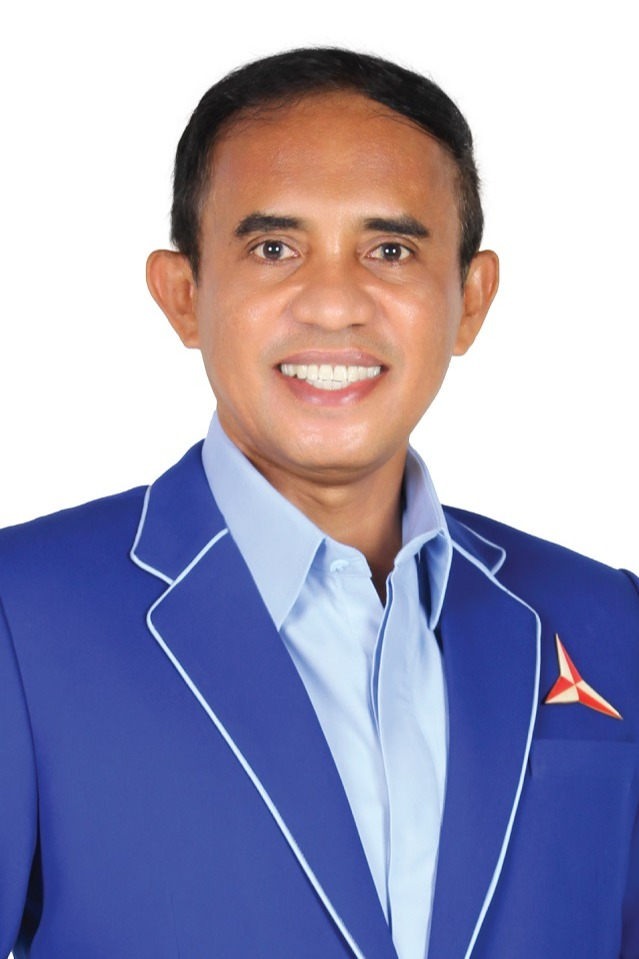

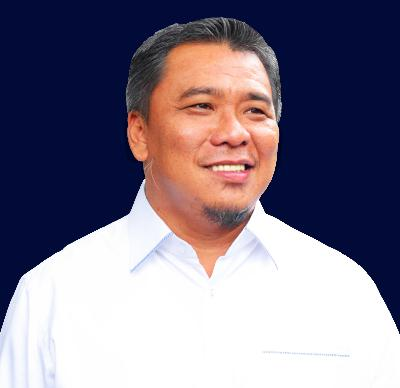

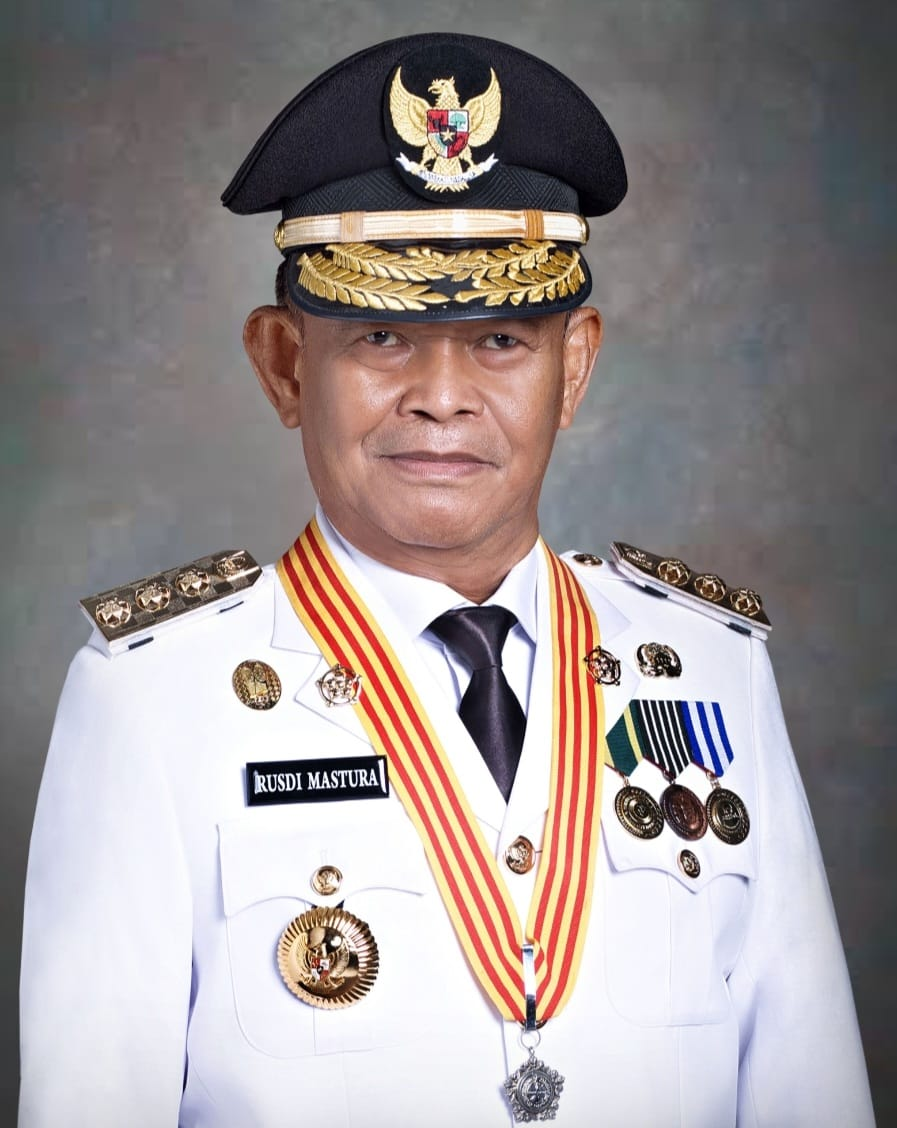
Candidate	Anwar Hafid	Ahmad Ali	Rusdy Mastura
Party	Demokrat	NasDem	Gerindra (Note: Despite Rusdy being a member of Gerindra, the party instead backed Ahmad Ali. Rusdy was nominated by the PDI-P, Hanura, the Labour Party and Ummah.)
Alliance	–	KIM Plus	–
Running mate	Reny Lamadjido	Abdul Karim Aljufri	Sulaiman Agusto
Popular vote	724,518	621,693	263,950
Percentage	45.00%	38.61%	16.39%
- Results map by district
Governor before election
Rusdy Mastura
Gerindra
Elected Governor
Anwar Hafid
Demokrat

The 2024 Central Sulawesi gubernatorial election was held on 27 November 2024 as part of nationwide local elections to elect the governor of Central Sulawesi for a five-year term. The previous election was held in 2020. The election was won by former House of Representatives Member Anwar Hafid of the Democratic Party with 45% of the vote. The runner up, Ahmad Ali of the NasDem Party, received 38%. Incumbent Governor Rusdy Mastura lost re-election, placing third with 16% of the vote.

== Electoral system ==
The election, like other local elections in 2024, follow the first-past-the-post system where the candidate with the most votes wins the election, even if they do not win a majority. It is possible for a candidate to run uncontested, in which case the candidate is still required to win a majority of votes "against" an "empty box" option. Should the candidate fail to do so, the election will be repeated on a later date.

== Candidates ==
According to electoral regulations, in order to qualify for the election, candidates were required to secure support from a political party or a coalition of parties controlling 11 seats (20 percent of all seats) in the Central Sulawesi Regional House of Representatives (DPRD). As no parties won 11 or more seats in the 2024 legislative election, parties are required to form coalitions to nominate a candidate. However, following a Constitutional Court of Indonesia decision in August 2024, the political support required to nominate a candidate was lowered to between 6.5 and 10 percent of the popular vote. Candidates may alternatively demonstrate support to run as an independent in form of photocopies of identity cards, which in Central Sulawesi's case corresponds to 190,120 copies. No independent candidates registered with the General Elections Commission (KPU) prior to the set deadline.

=== Potential ===
The following are individuals who have either been publicly mentioned as a potential candidate by a political party in the DPRD, publicly declared their candidacy with press coverage, or considered as a potential candidate by media outlets:

- Rusdy Mastura (Gerindra), incumbent governor.
- Irwan Lapatta (Golkar), regent of Sigi.
- Ahmad Ali (NasDem), member of the House of Representatives, deputy chairman of the Nasdem Party.

- Abdul Karim Aljufri (Gerindra), member of Central Sulawesi DPRD, secretary of Gerindra's Central Sulawesi branch (as running mate).

- Anwar Hafid (Demokrat), member of the House of Representatives, chairman of Demokrat's Central Sulawesi branch.
- Sri Indraningsih Lalusu (PDI-P), member of Central Sulawesi DPRD (as the Golkar candidate's running mate).

== Political map ==
Following the 2024 Indonesian legislative election, twelve political parties are represented in the Central Sulawesi DPRD:

Political parties	Seat count
Party of Functional Groups (Golkar)	8 / 55
NasDem Party	8 / 55
Democratic Party (Demokrat)	8 / 55
Indonesian Democratic Party of Struggle (PDI-P)	7 / 55
Great Indonesia Movement Party (Gerindra)	7 / 55
Prosperous Justice Party (PKS)	5 / 55
National Awakening Party (PKB)	5 / 55
National Mandate Party (PAN)	2 / 55
Perindo Party	2 / 55
United Development Party (PPP)	1 / 55
People's Conscience Party (Hanura)	1 / 55
Crescent Star Party (PBB)	1 / 55

== Results ==
Candidate	Running mate	Party	Votes	%
Anwar Hafid	Reny Lamadjido	Democratic Party	724,518	45.00
Ahmad Ali	Abdul Karim Aljufri	NasDem Party	621,693	38.61
Rusdy Mastura	Sulaiman Agusto	Gerindra Party	263,950	16.39
Total			1,610,161	100.00
Valid votes			1,610,161	97.87
Invalid votes			35,062	2.13
Total votes			1,645,223	100.00
Registered voters/turnout			2,255,639	72.94
Source: KPU Sulawesi Tengah

Candidate vote share by district
Ahmad Ali–Abdul

Anwar–Reny

Rusdy–Sulaiman
