= Boeol =

Boeol may refer to:

- Buol (city), Indonesia
- Buol (village), Indonesia
