= Abdillah Toha =

Indonesian politician (1942–2026)

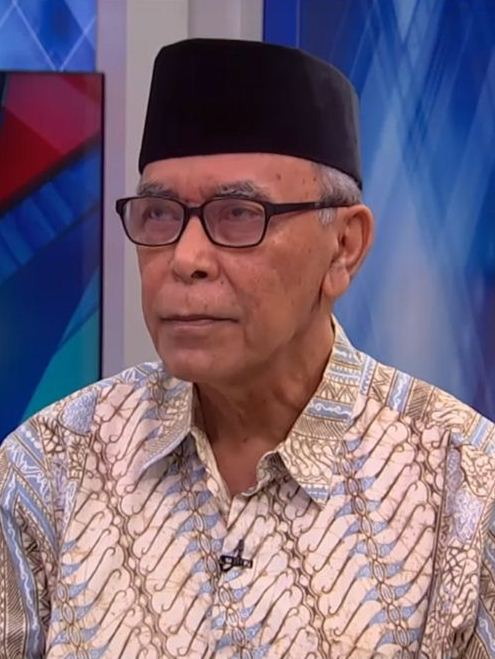
- Toha in 2019

Member of the House of Representatives of Indonesia for Banten II
- In office 1 October 2004 – 30 September 2009

Personal details
- Born: 29 April 1942 Surakarta, Japanese-occupied Dutch East Indies
- Died: 26 May 2026 (aged 84)
- Party: PAN
- Education: University of Western Australia (BCom)
- Occupation: Academic

Abdillah Toha (29 April 1942 – 26 May 2026) was an Indonesian academic, intellectual, columnist, businessman, and politician. He was a co-founder of the National Mandate Party (PAN) and served as a member of the House of Representatives from 2004 to 2009. He was described by colleagues as a "public intellectual guarding common sense" and a "modernist Islamic thinker."

Toha died on 26 May 2026, at the age of 84.

== Early life and education ==
Toha was born in Solo (also spelled Surakarta), Central Java, on 29 April 1942. He completed his secondary education at SMEAN II Solo.

He earned a Bachelor of Economics degree from Gadjah Mada University. He later pursued further studies at the University of Western Australia in Perth, where he earned a Bachelor of Commerce degree with First Class Honours and received the J A Wood Memorial Award from the Faculty of Economics and Commerce. He was a classmate of Boediono, who later became Vice President of Indonesia, during his time at the university.

After completing his studies, Toha taught Operations Research and conducted marketing research at the same faculty. He was also an alumnus of the Asia Pacific Center for Security Studies (APC-SS) in Honolulu, Hawaii.

== Academic and intellectual career ==
Toha was widely recognized as a modernist Islamic thinker and public intellectual. He was a lecturer at the University of Indonesia (UI) and served as the head of the Economics and Business Research Center at the university.

He was an active columnist and writer. His writings often addressed politics, democracy, Islam, civil liberties, and social criticism in a style described as sharp but reflective. One of his well-known books is Buat Apa Beragama? Renungan Memaknai Religiusitas di Tengah Keberagaman (Why Have Religion? Reflections on Finding Religiosity Amidst Diversity). He was also known as a novelist; one of his novels is Cerobong Tua Terus Mendera (The Old Chimney Keeps Haunting).

== Organizational activities ==
Toha was active in several Islamic and social organizations. He was a member of HMI (Islamic Students' Association) and ICMI (Indonesian Association of Muslim Intellectuals). He was also a founder and member of the Paramadina Foundation, a prominent Islamic reformist think tank in Indonesia.

He served as executive director of the Institute for Socio-Economic and Political Studies (In-SEP), was a founder and board member of the Center for Agribusiness Development, and was a founder and board member of the AINI Eye Hospital Foundation.

== Business career ==
In the business sector, Toha was active in publishing. He was the founder and President Commissioner of the Mizan Publishing Group, one of Indonesia's largest Islamic book publishers. He also served as President Director of the Baraka Group, a company involved in property, trading, and financial consultancy.

== Political career ==
=== Co-founding PAN ===
After the fall of President Suharto during the Reformation movement in May 1998, Toha co-founded the National Mandate Party (PAN) together with Amien Rais, Goenawan Mohamad, and other reformist figures. He served as one of the party's first formateurs (founding committee members) and as a member of the party's executive board (DPP). He also served as a member of the party's advisory board.

=== 2021 open letter to Amien Rais ===
In May 2021, Toha was among five PAN co-founders who signed an open letter calling for fellow co-founder and party chairman Amien Rais to resign. The letter criticized Rais for turning religion into a political tool and for his close association with hardline Islamic groups, stating that such actions were incompatible with PAN's identity as a modern and inclusive party.

=== House of Representatives (2004–2009) ===
In the 2004 legislative election, Toha was elected as a member of the House of Representatives for the Banten II electoral district, covering Lebak and Pandeglang regencies. He served from 1 October 2004 to 30 September 2009.

During his tenure, Toha served as:

- Deputy Chair of Commission I of the DPR (defense and security)
- Chair of the PAN faction in the DPR
- Chair of the Inter-Parliamentary Cooperation Agency (BKSAP) of the DPR
- Vice President Executive Committee of the Inter-Parliamentary Union (IPU) in Geneva, Switzerland

== Death ==
Toha died on 26 May 2026 at the age of 84. His body was buried at the Tanah Kusir Public Cemetery in South Jakarta.

Several political and religious figures attended the funeral or expressed condolences, including:

- Zulkifli Hasan, Chairman of PAN
- Hatta Rajasa, former Coordinating Minister for Economic Affairs
- Quraish Shihab, prominent Islamic scholar and Quran interpreter
- Haedar Nashir, Chairman of Muhammadiyah, who praised Toha as a "consistent figure in fighting for the interests of the people"

== Personal life ==
Toha was married to Ning Salma. The couple had three children.

== See also ==
- National Mandate Party
- List of members of the House of Representatives of Indonesia, 2004–2009
