= Marinus Gea =

Indonesian politician (born 1973)

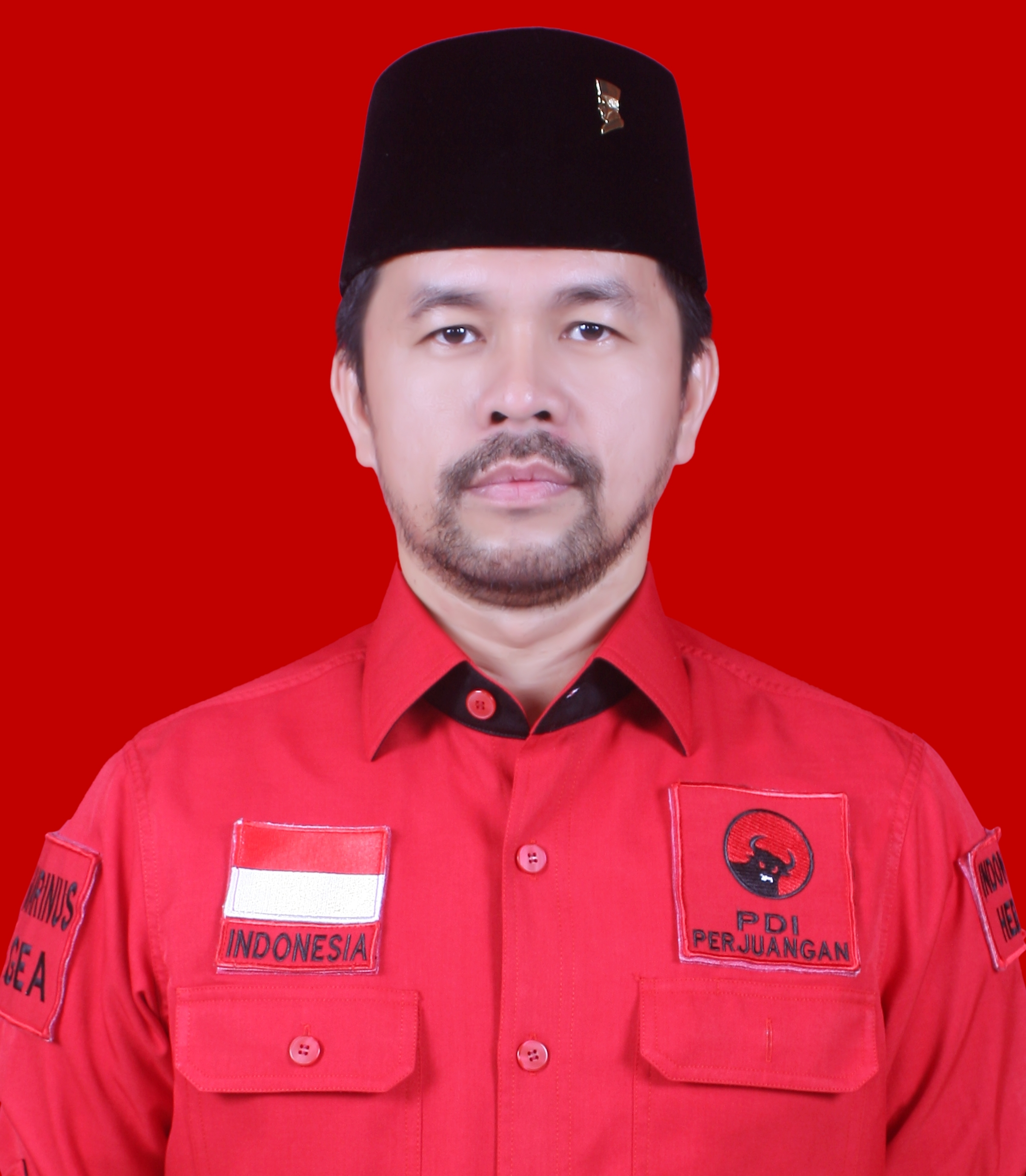

Member of People's Representative Council
- Incumbent
- Assumed office 1 October 2014
- Constituency: Banten III

Personal details
- Born: 6 January 1973 (age 52); Gunungsitoli, North Sumatra, Indonesia
- Political party: PDI-P

Marinus Gea (born 6 January 1973) is an Indonesian politician who has been a member of the People's Representative Council from PDI-P since 2014.

== Early life ==
Marinus Gea was born on 6 January 1973 in Gunungsitoli, in Nias Island of North Sumatra. He was educated there until he graduated from an economic school in 1992. He then moved to Jakarta and began to work there. Later on, he studied accounting at Mercu Buana University between 2004 and 2014, obtaining bachelors and masters degrees.

== Career ==
After moving to Jakarta, Marinus worked for 5 years in 2 companies, before starting his own business in 1997. By 2002, his work had moved to Tangerang.

In 2013, he registered to run as mayor of Tangerang in the city's 2013 mayoral election under PDI-P, but did not run in the election. The following year, he ran as a legislative candidate in the 2014 legislative election and won a seat representing Banten's 3rd electoral district. He was reelected from the same district in the 2019 legislative election, and in the 2024 election with 74,909 votes.

Marinus has served as chairman of the Indonesian Nias People's Association (HIMNI), and is a supporter of the creation of a new province for the Nias archipelago.
