= Himmatul Alyah Setiawaty =

Indonesian politician (born 1958)

Member of People's Representative Council
- In office 1 October 2009 – 1 October 2014
- Constituency: Banten III

Personal details
- Born: 21 August 1958 (age 66); Jakarta, Indonesia
- Political party: Demokrat

Himmatul Alyah Setiawaty (born 21 August 1958) is an Indonesian lawyer and politician of the Democratic Party who served as a member of the People's Representative Council between 2009–2014, representing Banten's 3rd electoral district.

== Early life ==
Himmatul was born in Jakarta on 21 August 1958. She studied at the University of Indonesia (UI), receiving a bachelors of law in 1984. Later, she returned to UI to study for a masters in business law, graduating in 2003.

== Career ==
After receiving her bachelors, she worked at the insurance companies PT Asuransi Timur Jauh and PT Asuransi Berdikari in secretarial positions. In 2001, she became a legal manager at Berdikari before moving to work at a number of law firms, first as a legal consultant before becoming a managing partner. She was also a founding member of the Democratic Party's women arm Perempuan Demokrat Republik Indonesia.

She was elected into the People's Representative Council to represent Banten's 3rd electoral district (Tangerang Regency and Tangerang in 2009) following the 2009 Indonesian legislative election. She had won 39,942 votes. In the legislature, Himmatul was a member of the Third Commission. She has stated her support for the death penalty to apply to rapists. She also led a special committee to draft a law protecting traditional laws, but the law failed to pass before the end of her tenure. Himmatul blamed the government for sending expert staff who were not qualified in traditional laws.

Himmatul ran for a second term in the 2014 legislative election from the same electoral district, but was not reelected. She ran again in 2019, still in the same district, and failed to win a seat after securing 12,848 votes.

== Personal life ==
Himmatul is married to Suhartono, and the couple has two children. During her time at UI, she took part in its golfing association.
