= Annisa Mahesa =

Indonesian politician (born 2001)

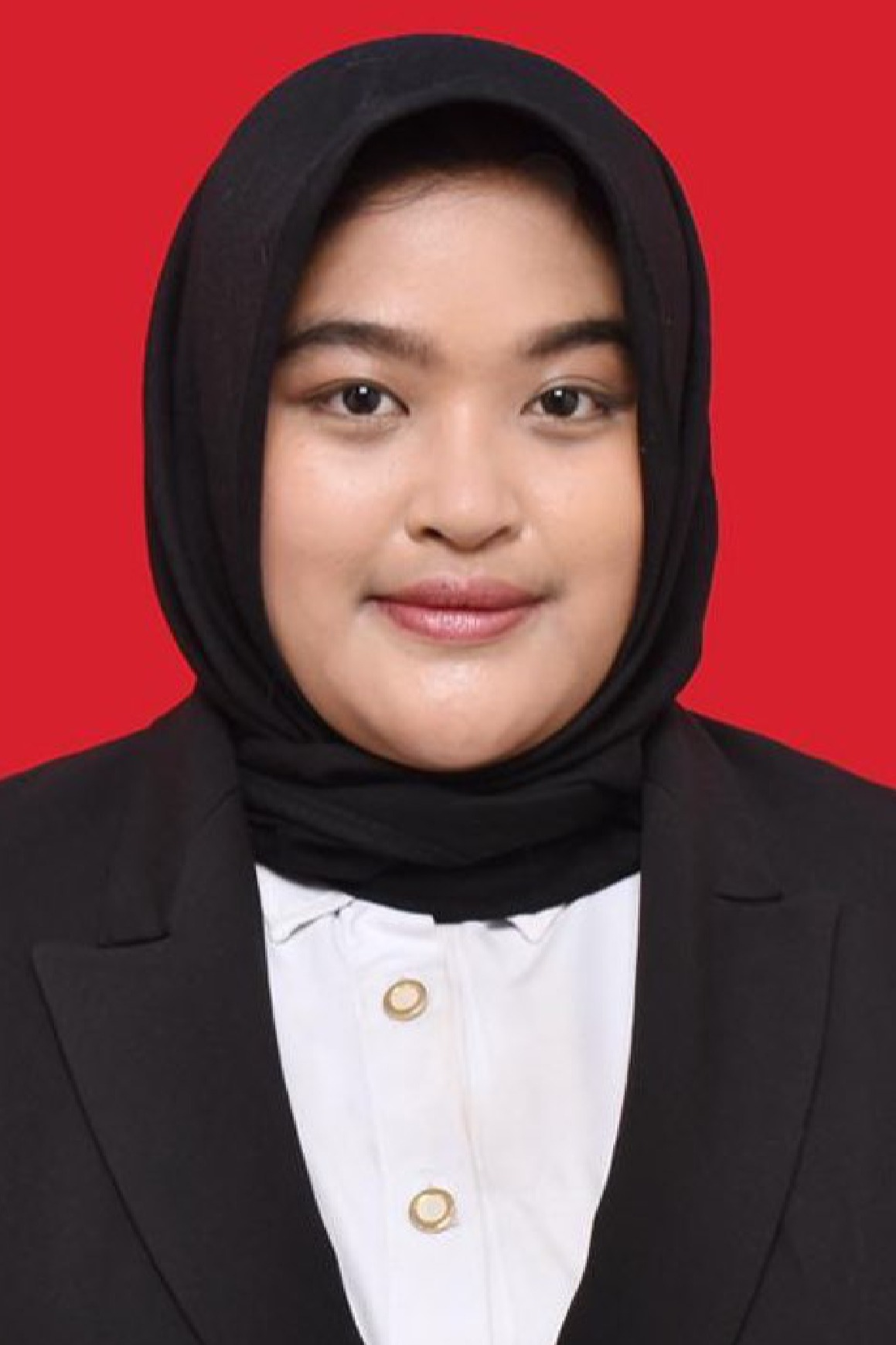

Member of House of Representatives
- Incumbent
- Assumed office 1 October 2024
- Constituency: Banten II

Personal details
- Born: Annisa Maharani Alzahra Mahesa; 17 July 2001 (age 25) Jakarta, Indonesia
- Party: Gerindra
- Parent: Desmond Junaidi Mahesa (father)
- Education: University of Indonesia; University of Melbourne
- Occupation: Politician

Annisa Maharani Alzahra Mahesa (born 17 July 2001) is an Indonesian politician who serves as a member of the House of Representatives for the 2024–2029 period, representing the Gerindra Party Faction from the Banten II electoral district. At the time of her inauguration, Annisa became the youngest member of the House at 23 years, 2 months, and 15 days old. She is the eldest daughter of Desmond Junaidi Mahesa, a politician from Gerindra.

== Early life and education ==
Mahesa was born on 17 July 2001, as the first child of Desmond Junaidi Mahesa and Nurnaningsih. She has a younger brother named Hijaz Mahesa.

Mahesa pursued her education at Kharisma Bangsa Junior High School in Tangerang (2013–2017) and State Senior High School 34 Jakarta (2017–2019). She was active in the student council during junior high school and in the choir during her senior high school years. After graduating from high school, she enrolled in a dual-degree international program and earned a Bachelor of Economics from the Department of Management of the Faculty of Economics and Business of the University of Indonesia (FEB UI) (2019–2021), as well as a Bachelor of Commerce from the University of Melbourne (2021–2023). During her studies, she was actively involved in the Student Representative Council of FEB UI as a member.

== Political career ==
Mahesa embarked on a political career following in the footsteps of her father. She registered as a legislative candidate for the House of Representatives from the Gerindra Party in the Banten II electoral district (comprising Serang City, Serang Regency, and Cilegon City). She was elected as a member of the House after securing 122,470 votes. As the youngest member of the House, she served as interim deputy speaker of the House alongside Guntur Sasono, the oldest member. This was in accordance with Law Number 2 of 2018, Article 84, which stipulates that the interim leadership of the House is held by the oldest and youngest members.
