= Risharyudi Triwibowo =

Indonesian politician

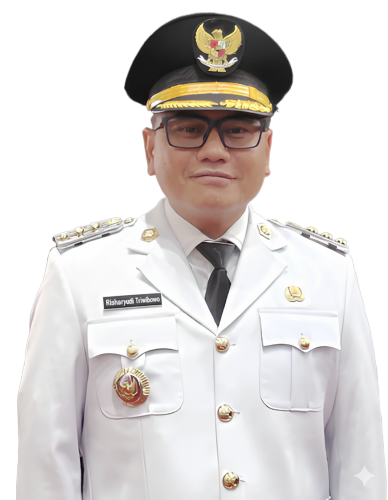

4th Regent of Buol
- Incumbent
- Assumed office 20 February 2025
- Preceded by: Amirudin Rauf

Personal details
- Born: 3 May 1975 (age 51) Sentani, Irian Jaya, Indonesia
- Party: PKB

Risharyudi Triwibowo Timumun (born 3 May 1975) is an Indonesian politician of the National Awakening Party. He has served as the regent of Buol, Central Sulawesi since February 2025. He was born in Jayapura Regency, and spent most of his childhood and early career there before entering government service in 2014.

== Early life ==
Risharyudi Triwibowo was born in Sentani, in Jayapura Regency of Papua province, on 3 May 1975 as the third of six children. His father Idris Rachman Timumun originates from the Buol (grandfather's side) and Kaili (grandmother's side) groups, and had moved from Parigi Moutong to Papua during Operation Trikora as an Indonesian military infiltrator. Triwibowo's mother Sri Hartati was a Javanese transmigrant to Papua who had moved there after Papua's annexation into Indonesia.

Triwibowo completed high school in Sentani in 1993, and then moved to Bandung where he studied at a tourism academy. He would later obtain a master's degree in management from Jayapura's Cenderawasih University in 2010.

== Career ==
After obtaining his degree in Bandung, Triwibowo worked briefly there as a manager for an event organizer company before he returned to Jayapura. He worked as a manager at the Rasen Hotel there until 2008, later becoming director and commissioner of the hotel's holding company. By 2005, he had joined the National Awakening Party (PKB), becoming the party's chairman in Jayapura. He then became one of the party's candidates for the House of Representatives (DPR) in Papua for the 2014 election.

In 2014, Triwibowo went to Jakarta and became an advisor to the Ministry of Villages and Development of Disadvantaged Regions. During his time at the ministry, he worked with regional leaders in Central Sulawesi. In 2019, he would become an advisor to the Ministry of Manpower. He had also run as a PKB candidate for DPR in 2019 and in 2024, both from the Central Sulawesi district.

Triwibowo ran to become the regent of Buol in the 2024 Indonesian local elections, with Nasir Daimaroto as his running mate. The pair won after securing 35,286 votes (40.25%) in the five-way race. They were sworn in on 20 February 2025.

== Personal life ==
He is married to Shinta Andriani Ningsih. Triwibowo owned a Harley-Davidson motorcycle which he had not reported as part of his 2024 wealth report (a requirement to run for Buol's regent), and it was seized by the Corruption Eradication Commission in July 2025 as part of an ongoing investigation into the Manpower Ministry. Triwibowo later admitted that he received a monetary gift which he had used to purchase the motorcycle, and upon learning of the ongoing investigation, he reported the purchase and handed over the motorcycle.
