= Bokat, Sulawesi =

Bokat is a district in Buol Regency, Central Sulawesi Province of Indonesia. It covers an area of 196.1 km^{2}. As of the 2010 census the population was 12,609 but by the 2020 Census this had risen to 15,045. The administrative centre is in the town of the same name.
