= Sufmi Dasco Ahmad =

Indonesian politician and businessman

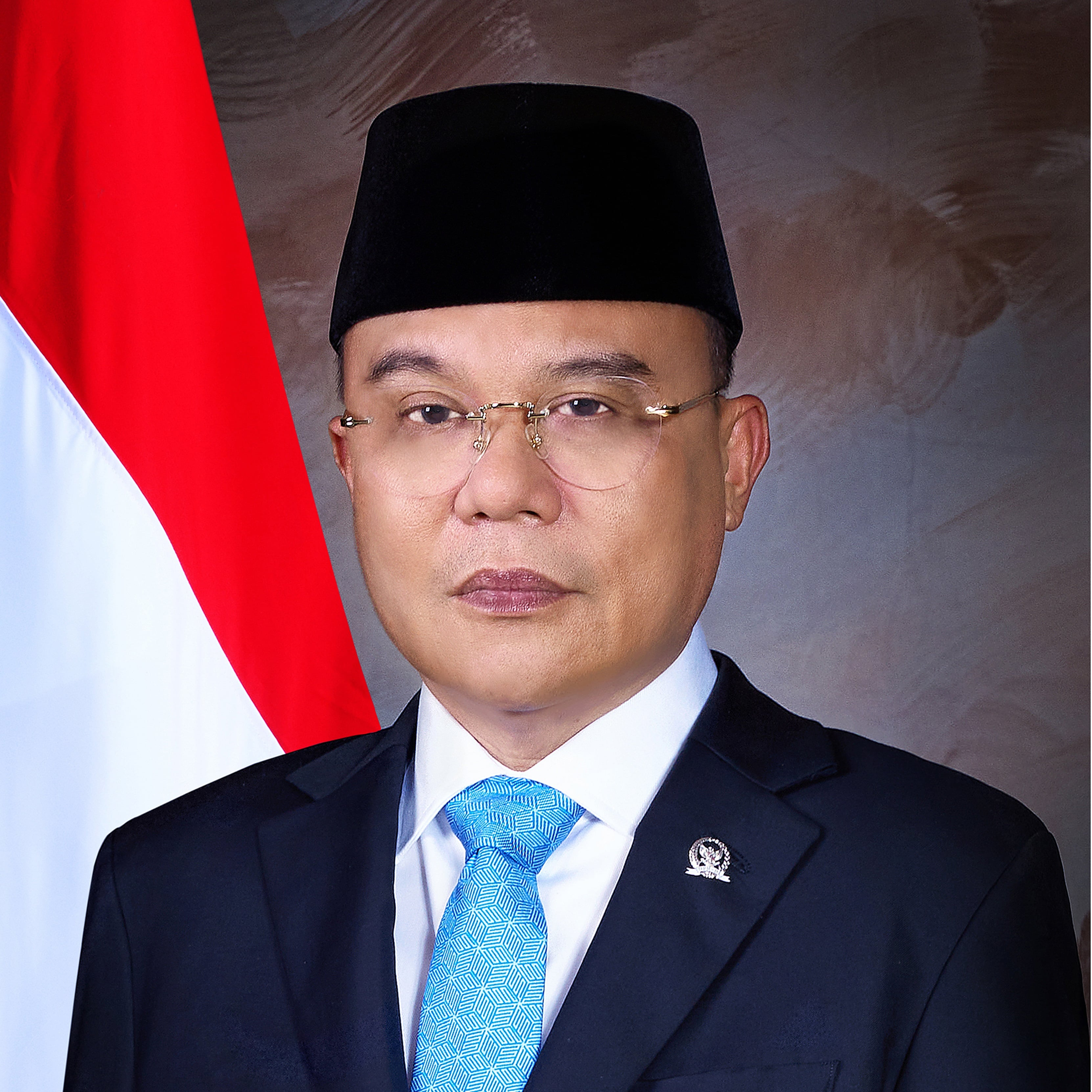
- Official portrait, 2024

Deputy Speaker of the House of Representatives
- Incumbent
- Assumed office 1 October 2019 Serving with 3 other people
- Speaker: Puan Maharani

Member of the House of Representatives
- Incumbent
- Assumed office 1 October 2014
- Constituency: Banten III
- Majority: 99,002 (2019); 119,692 (2024)

Personal details
- Born: 7 October 1967 (age 59) Bandung, West Java, Indonesia
- Party: Gerindra Party
- Relations: Rani Mauliani (sister-in-law)

Sufmi Dasco Ahmad (born 7 October 1967) is an Indonesian politician and businessman who is currently serving as a deputy speaker of the House of Representatives since 2019. A member of the Gerindra Party, he has served in the House of Representatives from the Banten III electoral district since 2014. Dasco is widely regarded as one of the most trusted confidants of President Prabowo Subianto and he has been instrumental in steering Prabowo's legislative initiatives in the House.

== Early life and education ==
Dasco was born on 7 October 1967 in Bandung, West Java. Dasco completed elementary school in Palembang, middle school in Jakarta, and high school in Manado. After graduating from high school, he enrolled in the engineering department of Pancasila University, studying electrical engineering. Dasco obtained a bachelor's degree from there in 1993, and he later studied law in several other universities, namely Jakarta University, Jakarta Islamic University, and Bandung Islamic University, respectively.

== Career ==
=== In Gerindra ===
After working for some time, Dasco had done some business with Fadli Zon, and from this connection, he entered politics. Dasco became a founding member of the Great Indonesia Movement Party (Gerindra), and in 2008 he was appointed as the chairman of its central committee. Following the 2014 elections, Dasco was elected into the People's Representative Council, representing the Banten III electoral district with 56,323 votes. In his first term, he was part of the council's third commission on law, human rights, and security, in addition to chairing the body's ethics council. Within Gerindra, he later became a deputy chairman.

In October 2017, Dasco accused the Indonesian Police of bias against Gerindra. He also stated that communism in Indonesia had the potential to "revive and spread overseas".

Dasco was reelected to the council from the same district with 99,002 votes following the 2019 elections, and he was appointed one of the body's deputy speakers. He was reelected in 2024 with 119,692 votes.

During his tenure as Deputy Speaker of the House of Representatives, Dasco was involved in various legislative deliberations and lawmaking processes, including the Employment Protection Bill. On 5 October 2026, Dasco chaired a Commission IX meeting that approved the bill to proceed to the House of Representatives' plenary session. On 6 October 2026, he attended the plenary session, chaired by House Speaker Puan Maharani, at which the Employment Protection Bill was officially passed into law.

=== Academics ===
Since 2021, he has been a Lecturer of Law at Pakuan University and was appointed Professor of Law in 2022.

Tempo magazine reported that he "earned his professorship without fulfilling the 10-year teaching requirement, while his papers were published in journals that were either discontinued or not indexed by Scopus."

== Honours ==
- Indonesia
  - Star of Mahaputera (2nd Class) (Indonesian: Bintang Mahaputera Adipradana) (14 August 2024)
