= Tinombo Selatan =

- Interactive map of Tinombo Selatan
- Coordinates: 0°03′N 120°02′E
- Country: Indonesia
- Province: Central Sulawesi
- Regency: Parigi Moutong Regency

Tinombo Selatan (South Tinombo) is a district in Parigi Moutong Regency, Central Sulawesi, Indonesia.

== Settlements ==
- Buol
- Khatulistiwa
- Malanggo
- Malanggo Pesisir
- Maninili
- Maninili Barat
- Maninili Utara
- Oncone Raya
- Poly
- Siaga
- Sigega Bersehati
- Sigenti
- Sigenti Barat
- Sigenti Selatan
- Silutung
- Siney
- Siney Tengah
- Tada
- Tada Selatan
- Tada Timur
- Tada Utara
