= Keramat, Sulawesi =

District in Sulawesi, Indonesia

Keramat or Karamat is a district in Buol Regency, Sulawesi, Indonesia. It covers 153.1 km^{2} (59.1 sq mi). As of the 2010 census the population was 8,296, but by the 2020 Census this had risen to 9,734. The administrative centre is at Busak.
