= Siti Hartati Murdaya =

Indonesian businesswoman

Siti Hartati Tjakra Murdaya
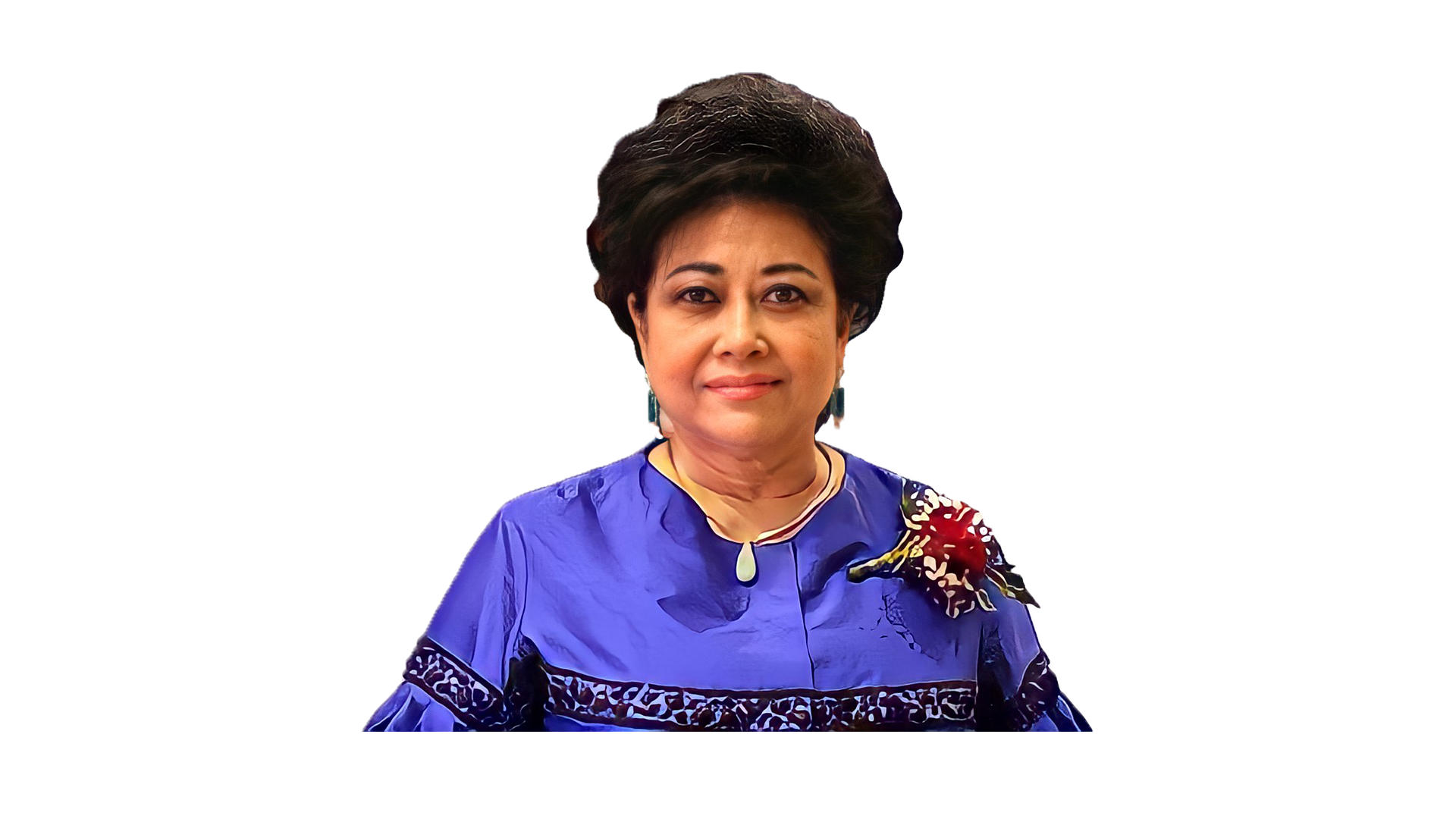
- Born: 29 August 1946 (age 80); Jakarta, Indonesia
- Other name: Chow Li Ing (邹丽􀓳)
- Occupations: Businesswoman, Buddhist figure
- Spouse: Murdaya Poo
- Children: 4

Siti Hartati Tjakra Murdaya (Chow Li Ing; born 29 August 1946) is a prominent Indonesian businesswoman and Buddhist figure. She co-founded the Cipta Cakra Murdaya (CCM) group of companies, which is involved in real estate, IT, timber, plantations, consumer goods and engineering. The company's real estate assets include shopping centers, office buildings, hotels and the Jakarta International Expo Center. Hartati was in 2013 sentenced to 32 months in jail for paying bribes to obtain permits for her oil palm plantation companies.

== Early life, education, family ==
Hartati grew up in Tanah Abang, Central Jakarta, the eldest of seven children in a devout Buddhist family. Her father, Tjakra Bhudi, was a former journalist. She studied economics at Trisakti University, and worked in her father's sawmill company as general manager after graduation. In 1971, the 25-year-old Hartati met a young entrepreneur, Murdaya Widyawimarta Poo (also known as Poo Tjie Goan), and they married in 1972. A year later, Hartati left her father's company to assist her husband in building his business. In 1984, Hartati attended an executive program for graduate students at Stanford University in California, as well as a program in management for smaller companies at the National University of Singapore in 1985. Hartati's four children were educated in the US from a young age and reside in San Francisco, New York, and Jakarta.

== Business ==
In the early 1970s, Hartati and her husband founded PT CCM, which focused on the electricity and construction sectors. Regarded as cronies of authoritarian president Suharto, the couple made their fortunes through lucrative procurement contracts for state electricity company PLN. They were also close to the Indonesian military. As their business grew, Hartati and her husband went on to cooperate with some of the world's largest power companies, such as Fuji Electric of Japan and Asea Brown Boveri (ABB) of Switzerland. CCM also won a license for the production of Nike shoes in Indonesia, and marketed the products of some major technology firms, such as IBM, HP, Hitachi, Fujitsu and Symantec. As of 2013, the group employed about 45,000 people across various industries ranging from property to retail to agribusiness.

In 2012, Hartati was listed by Forbes as one of Asia's 50 Power Businesswomen. She did not make the list in 2016.

In 2018, Hartati and her husband ranked 32nd on Globe Asia's list of 150 richest Indonesians, with wealth of $1.4 billion. Also in 2018, Murdaya Poo was ranked 22nd on Forbes Media's list of Indonesia's 50 Richest.

Hartati's personal website lists CCM's business partners in the following sectors:

- Heavy industries and contracting: ABB, Balfour Beatty, Azbil, Carrier, Hitachi, Schindler, and Mitsubishi.
- Natural resources: Buyers of CCM's forestry, wood manufacturing, and palm oil plantations in Central Sulawesi and East Kalimantan are located in Japan, the US and Europe.
- Fashion retail and marketing: ColeHaan (Singapore), And1 (Indonesia) and Nike.
- Information technology: Hewlett Packard.
- Property: Metropolitan Kentjana and Hong Kong Land.

== Buddhist leader ==
In 1992, Hartati was appointed chairwoman of a Buddhist umbrella group called Leadership of Indonesian Buddhists (Perwalian Umat Buddha Indonesia, Walubi). This was the only national Buddhist organization recognized by the government during the Suharto regime and it helped to mobilize support among ethnic Chinese for Suharto's political vehicle, Golkar. Following the fall of Suharto in May 1998, a schism between the country's Buddhist groups prompted a challenge to Hartati's leadership of Walubi. This led to Walubi being dissolved in November 1998. Hartati quickly responded in December 1998 by founding the Representatives of the Indonesian Buddhist Community (Perwakilan Umat Buddha Indonesia, also called Walubi), which she has led since its inception. The organization aims to cultivate greater communication and cooperation between its components, and to promote Buddhism in Indonesia. Its components include Lembaga Keagamaan Buddha, Dewan Sangha, Badan Kehormatan and Wadah Kemasyarakatanin. One of Walubi's tenets is commitment to community service, along with having an open mind to other faiths and beliefs.

== Philanthropy ==
Under Hartati's leadership, Walubi is involved in post-disaster relief work, as well as missions where medical staff of different faiths volunteer to provide free treatment, such as cataract removals, cleft-palate corrections in children, tumor removals and dental care, to thousands of patients. Hartati organizes and participates in many of these missions herself. After the 2018 Sunda Strait tsunami, which killed over 400 people and left over 14,000 homeless, Hartati was involved in the provision of relief aid.

In November 2018, Hartati paid Rp120 million for a painting of Muslim leader and vice presidential candidate Ma'ruf Amin at a charity auction to raise funds for victims of the 2018 earthquake and tsunami in Palu and Donggala, Central Sulawesi.

== Corruption case ==
Indonesia's Corruption Eradication Commission (KPK) arrested Hartati on 12 September 2012 on suspicion of bribery. She subsequently resigned from the Democratic Party's board of patrons and the National Economic Committee. On 4 February 2013, Hartati was sentenced to 32 months in prison and fined Rp150 million ($15,000) after a court found her guilty of bribery. The penalty was less than the five-year sentence and Rp250 million fine recommended by the KPK. Hartati had paid Rp3 billion ($309,000) in bribes to Amran Batalipu, the former regent of Buol in Central Sulawesi, in exchange for land concessions for her oil palm plantation companies, PT Hartati Inti Plantation and PT Cipta Cakra Murdaya.

Hartati was released on parole on 23 July 2014, after serving two-thirds of her sentence. Her parole was granted by justice minister Amir Syamsuddin, who served with Hartati on the Democratic Party's board of advisers. Law observers criticized Hartati's early release, saying it undermined the government's efforts to combat corruption. Indonesia Corruption Watch said the parole was legally flawed because Hartati had not fulfilled all necessary requirements. KPK confirmed Hartati had not qualified for parole, denying it had recommended to the Justice Ministry that she be recognized as a "justice collaborator".

The Buol Farmers Forum also condemned the parole, saying Hartati's company had used military and police force to seize their traditional farmland, which was subsequently converted to oil palm plantations. They said the company's actions had caused ecological disasters and also led to conflict between farmers and oil palm plantation workers.

Prior to her arrest, Hartati denied any wrongdoing and claimed she could not lie because she is a religious person. During her trial, she claimed the money given to the regent was not a bribe but was a donation for his election campaign.

== Land grab accusation and palm oil criticism ==
Environmental groups and farmers have accused Hartati's CCM of using military force and paying bribes to take control of customary land and forests in Buol district. The bribery allegations were later proved in court. The land takeover operation commenced in 1994, when workers guarded by soldiers began chopping down forests to clear land for a 22,000 hectare oil palm plantation. Farmlands and forests used by over 6,500 families were destroyed. Plantation workers have complained that low wages keep them poor and in debt. Hartati's website states that her companies in many instances "improve and economically develop the land, enabling other local residents to improve their living conditions".

A 2018 report by Greenpeace put CCM on a list of "dirty producers" of palm oil. The report said neither CCM nor its Hardaya Plantations Group (HPG) is a member of the Roundtable on Sustainable Palm Oil (RSPO) and neither has a public "no deforestation, no peat, no exploitation" (NDPE) policy. It also said neither CCM nor HPG makes maps of its concession boundaries publicly available in a usable format. In response to the Greenpeace findings, Mars said actions had been taken to exclude the group from its supply chain.

== Politics ==
During the Suharto regime, Hartati used her position in the original Walubi Buddhist organization to channel support from Chinese-Indonesians to Suharto's political vehicle, Golkar. After the fall of Suharto, Hartati's husband, Murdaya Widyawimatra Poo, joined the Indonesian Democratic Party of Struggle (PDIP) of Megawati Sukarnoputri, who served as president from 2001 to 2004. Murdaya became a treasurer and financial supporter of PDIP. He was elected to national parliament in the 2004 and 2009 general elections. Hartati meanwhile joined the Democratic Party of Megawati's rival, Susilo Bambang Yudhoyono, who served as president from 2004 to 2014. She resigned from the party after being arrested for corruption in 2012. Earlier, her husband was dismissed from PDIP for allegedly channeling his support to Yudhoyono in the 2009 presidential election.

After a meeting with vice presidential candidate and Muslim leader Ma'ruf Amin in November 2018, Hartati denied her visit was a form of endorsement ahead of the 2019 presidential election. She said the meeting discussed how to maintain inter-religious harmony during the election year.
