= Tadulako University =

University

Coordinates: 0°50′16.8″S 119°53′46.5″E

- Universitas Tadulako
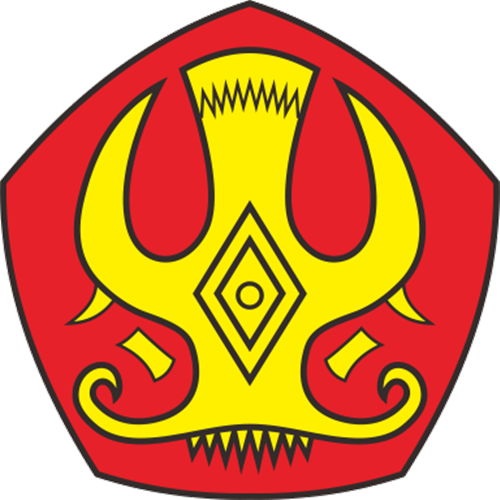
- Motto: University of 'Carier' (Creativity, Acceleration, Reformation, Internationalisation, Entrepreneurial, Reorientation)
- Type: Public
- Established: May 1, 1981
- Affiliations: ASAIHL
- Rector: Prof. Dr. Ir. Mahfudz, MP
- Academic staff: 10
- Students: +24.000
- Location: Jl. Soekarno Hatta, Palu Timur, Indonesia 94118, Palu, Central Sulawesi, Indonesia
- Campus: Tondo, Palu
- Colors: Blue, red, light yellow
- Nickname: Untad
- Website: www.untad.ac.id

Tadulako University (Indonesian: Universitas Tadulako; UNTAD) is a public university in Palu, Central Sulawesi, Indonesia. It was established on May 1, 1981 after being an affiliate of Hasanuddin University of Makassar for several years. Prof. Dr. Ir. Mahfudz, MP serves as the Rector.

The Tadulako University has eleven faculties, and is served by 1057 academic staff. Deriving from a small private education institution (1963), Tadulako University was established as public state university in 1981. On an outer island, the university today plays an important role in developing higher education, in the eastern part of Indonesia.

The university is 8 km from the central airport.

== History ==
The existence of universities in Central Sulawesi, which is the forerunner of the University of Tadulako, is marked by three stages — private status (1963-1966), branch status (1966-1981), and domestic stand-alone status "Tadulako" (UNTAD), since 1981.

=== Private status period (1963-1966) ===
On May 8, 1963 Tadulako received private status, under the first rector DVM. Nasri Gayur. On 12 September 1964, it was upgraded to “Listed” according to the Decree of the Minister of Higher Education and Science No. 94 / B-SWT / P / 64, with four faculties: Social and Political; Economic; Animal Science; and Education (Department of Life Sciences and Education). The Faculty of Law was added later.

=== Branch period (1966-1981) ===
The University of Hasanuddin University Tadulako Branch began by the Minister of Higher Education and Science (PTIP) No. 1 of 1966 dated January 1, 1966 and the Institute of Teacher Training and Education (Teachers’ Training College) Branch Makassar Palu by the Minister of Higher Education and Science (PTIP) No. 2 of 1966 on January 1, 1966.

Tadulako University of Hasanuddin University Branch (Branch UNTAD UNHAS) was divided into four faculties: Animal Science; of Economics; Law; and Social and Political. Teachers’ Training Branch Makassar Palu consisted of three faculties: Education; Teaching Literature and Art; Science of Teaching of Exact Sciences.

=== Stand-alone Tadulako State University (since 1981) ===
In 1978, with the help of the Directorate General of Higher Education and the Provincial Government of Central Sulawesi, the Koordinatorium College of Central Sulawesi (PTST), was formed, chaired by the governor of Central Sulawesi province with six vice-chairs, derived from UNTAD Branch UNHAS (three people) and Teachers’ Training Branch Makassar Palu (three people). The PTST Koordinatorium efforts to reunite the two universities in Central Sulawesi branch emerged and became a foundation for the establishment of a stand-alone public university.

With the support and efforts of communities in Central Sulawesi, local government, the rector of Hasanuddin University, the Makassar Rector Teachers’ Training College and the Directorate General of Higher Education, the status of the second branch of the higher education institutions mentioned above increased to “State University of Standing Own”, the name of Tadulako (UNTAD) in accordance with Presidential Decree No. 36 of 1981 dated August 14, 1981.

UNTAD consists of five faculties — Education, Social and Political Sciences, Economics, Law, and Agriculture.

A Faculty of Engineering was set up, in accordance with the Decree of the Minister of Education and Culture No. 0378/0/1993 dated October 21, 1993.

=== Rector inauguration ===
On March 7, 2011 in Jakarta, Minister of National Education, Prof. Ir. H. Muh. Nuh, DEA took the oath of office and inducted five university leaders and four of the echelon III and IV in the Ministry of National Education. Among the university leaders sworn in were Prof. Dr. Ir. Muh. Basir Cyio, SE, MS as rector to six Tadulako, for a term of four years (2011-2015). Basir Cyio was inaugurated by the Minister of National Education No. 75 / MPN.A4-KP / 2011, dated February 18, 2011.

(The other four leaders were Prof. Dr. Mahdi Bahar, S.Kar, M.Hum as rector IISIP West Sumatra Padang Panjang; Ir. Darmawan, MT as director of the Polytechnic Banjarmasin; Mahyus, S.Pd, SE, MM as director of Pontianak State Polytechnic; and Ir. Nana Dwi Wahyono, MM sworn in as director of Polytechnic of Jember. Muh.)

== Faculties ==
The university has 11 faculties:

- Faculty of Teacher Training and Education
- Faculty of Social and Political Sciences
- Faculty of Economics and Business
- Faculty of Law
- Faculty of Agriculture
- Faculty of Engineering
- Faculty of Mathematics and Natural Sciences
- Faculty of Forestry
- Faculty of Animal Husbandry and Fishery
- Faculty of Medicine
- Faculty of Public Health
