= Murdaya Poo =

Indonesian businessman and politician (1941–2025)

OBE Murdaya Poo
- Born: Murdaya Widyawimarta Poo; 12 January 1941; Blitar, Indonesia
- Died: 7 April 2025 (aged 84); Singapore
- Occupation: Founder of Central Cipta Murdaya
- Spouse: Siti Hartati Murdaya
- Children: 4

Chinese name
- Traditional Chinese: 傅志寬
- Simplified Chinese: 傅志宽
- Hanyu Pinyin: Fù Zhìkuān
- Hokkien POJ: Pò͘ Chì-khoan

Murdaya Widyawimarta Poo (12 January 1941 – 7 April 2025) was an Indonesian billionaire businessman and politician. He was the founder of Central Cipta Murdaya, a conglomerate with interests in engineering, IT, palm oil, and plywood. He also owned a substantial stake in listed property developer Metropolitan Kentjana.

Murdaya was a member of the People's Representative Council from 2004 to 2009, representing the Indonesian Democratic Party of Struggle (PDIP).

== Early life and education ==
Murdaya was born in Blitar, Indonesia, on 12 January 1941. He started his career as a newspaper seller in his youth. He entered the construction business in 1972 and founded Central Cipta Murdaya Group in 1992.

== Business career ==
Murdaya Poo's Central Cipta Murdaya Group has diversified businesses in various sectors, such as engineering, IT, palm oil and plywood. One of his flagship projects is the Jakarta International Expo, one of the city's biggest convention centers. He also held a significant stake in Metropolitan Kentjana, a property developer that operates several malls and residential complexes in Jakarta.

=== Net worth ===
Murdaya Poo had a net worth of US$1.2 billion as of March 2023, according to Forbes. He was ranked as the 37th richest person in Indonesia and the 2324th richest person in the world by Forbes. His wealth came from his diversified businesses in engineering, IT, palm oil, plywood and property development. He also owned nearly half of Metropolitan Kentjana, a listed property developer that operates several malls and residential complexes in Jakarta, including Pondok Indah Mall, one of the biggest and most visited shopping malls in Indonesia.

== Political career ==
Murdaya joined the PDIP in 1998 and became its treasurer and branch leader. He was elected as a member of the People's Representative Council for the 2004–2009 term, representing Jakarta.

== Personal life and death ==
Murdaya Poo was married to Siti Hartati Murdaya, who is also a billionaire and a former politician. They have four children: Prajna, Metta, Upekkha, and Karuna. Murdaya Poo was a vegetarian and enjoyed playing golf. In 2012 he was awarded an Honorary OBE from the British Government for his contributions towards strengthening Indonesia/UK relations.

He died of cancer in Singapore, on 7 April 2025, at the age of 84.
