= Sarifuddin Sudding =

Indonesian politician

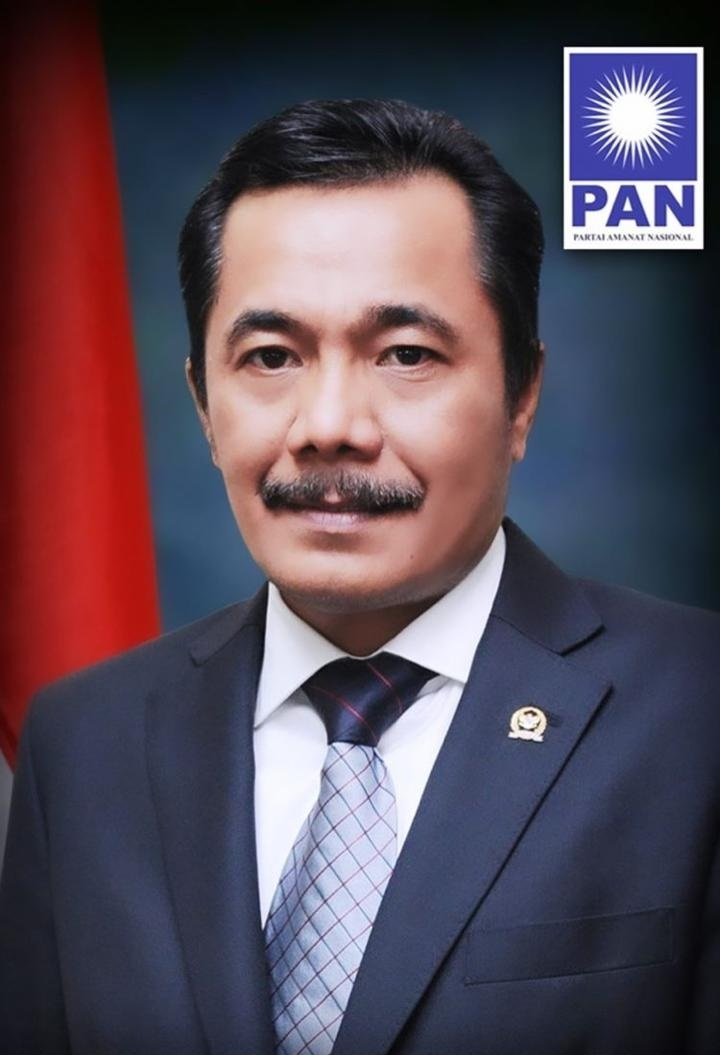
Sarifuddin Sudding

Sarifuddin Sudding (born 6 August 1966, also "Syarifuddin Sudding") is an Indonesian politician. He has served as a member of the House of Representatives since 2019.
