= Desmond Junaidi Mahesa =

Indonesian politician (1965–2023)

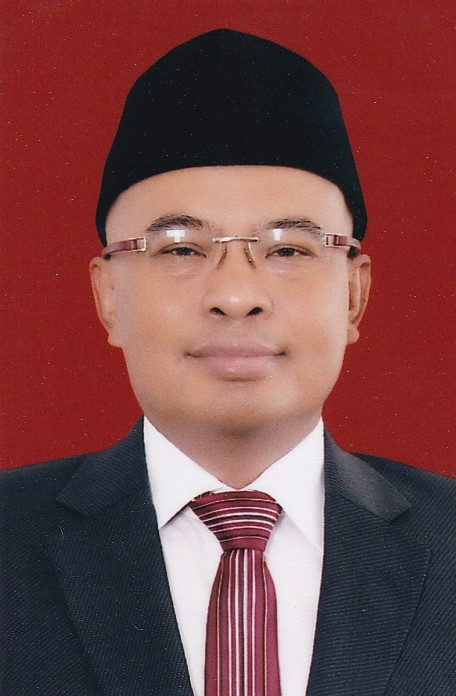
- Mahesa in 2016

Member of the People's Representative Council
- In office 1 October 2009 – 24 June 2023
- Constituency: East Kalimantan (2009–2014); Banten II (2014–2023)

Personal details
- Born: Junaidi; 12 December 1965 Banjarmasin, South Kalimantan, Indonesia
- Died: 24 June 2023 (aged 57) South Jakarta, Jakarta, Indonesia
- Party: Gerindra
- Spouse: Nurnaningsih
- Children: 2, including Annisa Mahesa
- Education: Lambung Mangkurat University; IBLAM Law School

Desmond Junaidi Mahesa (12 December 1965 – 24 June 2023) was an Indonesian politician from Gerindra who served as a member of the People's Representative Council from 2009 until his death in 2023. Prior to his election to the People's Representative Council, Mahesa was known as an activist and was kidnapped during the early days of Reformasi. He was also involved as a lawyer in several high-profile cases.

== Early life and education ==
Desmond Junaidi Mahesa was born as Junaidi on 12 December 1965 in Banjarmasin, South Kalimantan. His father, Muchtar bin Sirin, was a farmer and laborer, while his mother, Sa’diah binti Ubak, was an egg seller. He completed his elementary education at the Karya Masyarakat elementary school in 1981. He then moved to Banjarmasin and studied at public schools, with a distant family member paying for his tuition. He graduated from high school in 1983 and applied for the Lambung Mangkurat University.

Mahesa was admitted to the law faculty of the Lambung Mangkurat University. During his time in the university, Mahesa worked to pay for his living expenses and tuition, including construction work and cleaning services in offices, as well as pulling rickshaws at night around markets in Banjarmasin. Despite his work routine, Junaidi was also active in student activism and joined various student organizations, such as the Student Senate of Lambung Mangkurat University and Muslim Students Association. He also wrote for the Banjarmasin Post and Dinamika Berita newspapers. Junaidi graduated from the university with a law degree in 1994.

== Career ==
=== Lawyer and activism ===
Upon receiving his law degree, Junaidi moved to Jakarta and began to work in legal aid services. He was also active in environmental, agrarian, and political organizations. During a trial, Junaidi was refused entry to the court due to a misunderstanding by the judge and attorney. The judge had mistaken Junaidi as another person due to his mononymous name. As a result of this incident, Junaidi changed his name to Desmond Junaidi Mahesa.

On 4 February 1998, several months before the fall of Suharto, Mahesa and several other activists were kidnapped by unidentified gunmen near the Salemba campus of the University of Indonesia. Mahesa was freed on 3 April. Despite pressures from various parties to not blew up the case, Mahesa revealed his kidnapping on 12 May 1998. Mahesa was also involved in resolving the case of thirteen kidnapped activists who never returned.

After his kidnapping, Mahesa continued his work in the legal and environmental sector. He also opened a law office in Jakarta. He defended various clients in several high-profile cases, such as Tomy Winata in the Tempo office raid case in 2003. Mahesa was later invited by the People's Representative Council to testify on Winata's behalf. Other clients of Mahesa included former Kopassus commander Muchdi Purwopranjono and business magnate Eka Tjipta Widjaja. During his career as a lawyer, Mahesa received a postgraduate degree in law at the IBLAM Law School in 2004.

=== In the People's Representative Council ===
Mahesa joined Gerindra in 2008 and was nominated by the party for a People's Representative Council seat from the East Kalimantan constituency. Mahesa's campaign in East Kalimantan was described as "lackluster", but he received a lot of phone calls from the namecards that he distributed. Despite this, Mahesa was elected and was installed as MP on 1 October 2009. He was reelected in 2014 and 2019.

During his career in the People's Representative Council, Mahesa was seated in commission III, which handles law, human rights, and defense matters. Mahesa, as Gerindra's spokesperson, announced the party's rejection on the 2010 budget plan. Mahesa also refused to invoke the parliamentary inquiry rights in the Bank Century Scandal and questioned the legality of the appointment of Hendarman Supandji as attorney general.

== Personal life and death ==
Mahesa was married to Nurnaningsih and had two children.

Mahesa died at the Mayapada Hospital in Lebak Bulus, Jakarta on 24 June 2023, at the age of 57. Politicians and government officials from different parties delivered their condolences. Mahesa was interred at the Al-Azhar cemetery in Karawang.

== Works ==
- Mahesa, Desmond Junaidi (2012). Presiden offside, kita diam atau memakzulkan: catatan kritis seorang mantan aktivis (in Indonesian). Visimedia. ISBN 978-979-065-150-0.
- Franscis, Fary Dj; Mahesa, Desmond Junaidi (2012). Menggugat logika APBN: politik anggaran Partai Gerindra di Badan Anggaran DPR RI (in Indonesian). Penerbit Ledalero. ISBN 978-979-9447-03-6.
- Mahesa, Desmond Junaidi (2013). DPR offside: otokritik parlemen Indonesia (in Indonesian). RMBooks. ISBN 978-602-7936-04-1.
