= Rusdy Mastura =

Indonesian politician

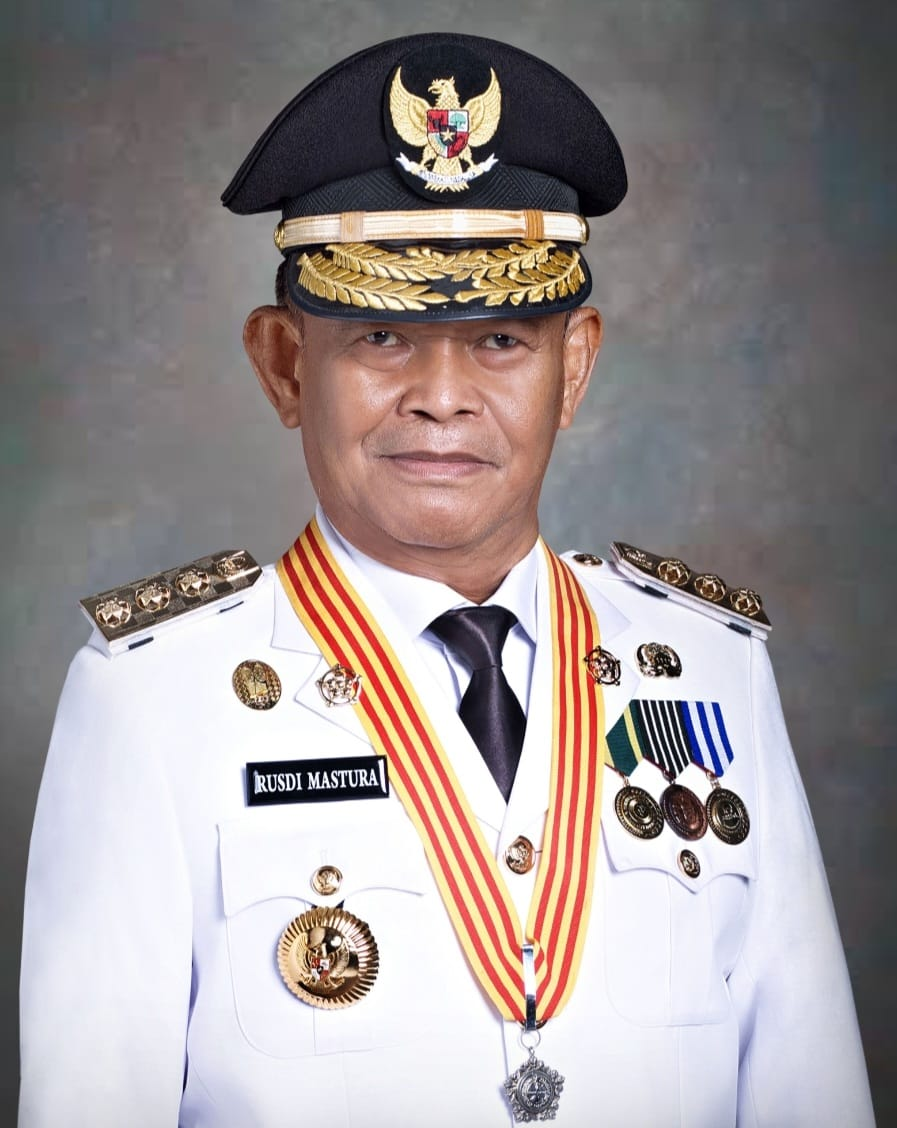
- Official portrait, 2021

Governor of Central Sulawesi
- In office 16 June 2021 – 20 February 2025
- President: Joko Widodo; Prabowo Subianto
- Deputy: Ma'mun Amir
- Preceded by: Longki Djanggola
- Succeeded by: Anwar Hafid

Mayor of Palu
- In office 12 October 2005 – 7 August 2015
- Preceded by: Suardin Suebo
- Succeeded by: Hidayat

Personal details
- Born: 8 February 1950 (age 76) Palu, Central Sulawesi, Indonesia
- Party: Gerindra Party

Rusdy Mastura (born 8 February 1950) is an Indonesian politician who is the governor of Central Sulawesi and was the mayor of the province's capital, Palu, between 2005 and 2015.

== Early life and education ==
Rusdy was born in Palu, Central Sulawesi, on 8 February 1950, and he completed his elementary and middle school education in Donggala, returning to Palu for high school.

== Career ==
Before being elected into political office, Rusdy worked as a consultant. He was also chairman of the Pancasila Youth organization in Central Sulawesi.

=== Palu ===
In 1997, Rusdy was elected into the city council for Palu, and then between 1999 and 2004 he chaired the city council. He participated in Palu's 2005 mayoral elections, when he won in a landslide after securing 60.82% of votes in a three-candidate race. He was reelected following the 2010 election, winning 32 percent of votes in a six-candidate race.

As Palu's mayor, Rusdy was the second Indonesian government official (after Abdurrahman Wahid during his presidency in 1999 to 2001) to publicly apologize for the mass killings in 1965–66. His initial apology stemmed from a human rights event in March 2012 where he stated that he was ordered to guard a house where Indonesian Communist Party members were detained, and then apologized to the victims. Rusdy's family was affiliated with Masyumi, which during 1965 was actively conducting violence against the communists. In October 2013, he issued a mayoral order which officially apologized to the victims and became a legal basis for the victims to reclaim their rights.

Rusdy initiated a plan, in conjunction with the central government, to establish a special economic zone in Palu, which would include investments in port and road facilities. He also began a work program which employed some 5,000 poor residents of the city. He resigned as mayor in August 2015 to participate in the gubernatorial elections for the province.

He was a member of Golkar until late 2017, when he moved to the NasDem Party, citing political reasons. Rusdy was chairman of Golkar's Donggala Regency branch in 2017 before his move.

=== As governor ===
Rusdy participated in the 2015 gubernatorial elections, but lost to Longki Djanggola and his lawsuit to the Constitutional Court was rejected. He ran again in 2020 and, this time, won the election after securing 891,334 votes (59.6%). He was sworn in on 16 June 2021. By early 2023, Rusdy was the Chairman of the Advisory Council of Nasdem Party's Central Sulawesi branch. In early to mid 2023, he moved to the Gerindra Party due to dissatisfaction with the Nasdem Party. Later he was appointed as the Chairman of the Advisory Council of Gerindra Party's Central Sulawesi branch.
