= Ahmad Ali (Indonesian politician) =

Indonesian politician

Ahmad H.M. Ali BEc
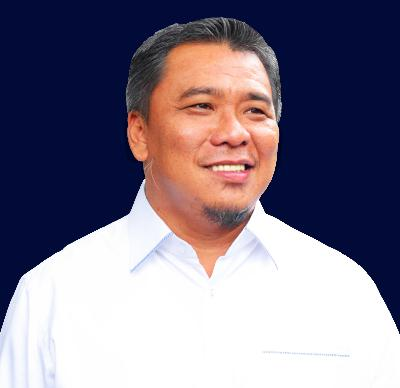

Member of People's Representative Council
- In office 1 October 2014 – 1 October 2024
- President: Susilo Bambang Yudhoyono; Joko Widodo
- Constituency: Central Sulawesi

Personal details
- Born: May 16, 1969 (age 57) Wosu, Sulawesi Tengah
- Party: PSI; NasDem (formerly)
- Spouse: Nilam Sari Lawira
- Children: 2
- Education: Tadulako University

Ahmad H.M. Ali, BEc (born 16 May 1969) is an Indonesian politician who served as a member of the People's Representative Council for two terms (2014–2019 and 2019–2024). He represents the electoral district of Central Sulawesi. Ali was a cadre of the NasDem Party before his move to the Indonesian Solidarity Party in 2025. He sat in Third Commission and doubled as the Chairman of the NasDem Party Faction in the DPR-RI.

== Educational background ==
He attended Wosu primary school (1975–1981), Bungku Junior High School (1982–1985), and Bungku High School (1985–1988). He received his Bachelor of Economics from Tadulako University (1988–1993).

== Organizational history ==
- Chairman of the Asphalt Association
- Chairman of Provincial Grapensi
- Chairman of DPW NasDem Party of Central Sulawesi
- Management of KADIN Central Sulawesi
- Pancasila Youth Board
- Executive Board of HMI Palu Branch
- General Treasurer of the DPP NasDem Party (2017–2019)
- Vice Chairman of the DPP NasDem Party (2019–2024)

== Career ==
- Employee at PT Tadulako Dirgantara Travel
- Director of PT Graha Istika Utama
- Director of PT Graha Agro Utama
- Director of PT Graha Mining Utama
- Member of the Regional House of Representatives of Morowali Regency (2009–2014)
- Member of DPR-RI (2014–2019, 2019–present)
- Chairman of the NasDem Party Faction of the House of Representatives (2019–present)
