= Ali Taher =

Indonesian politician (1961–2021)

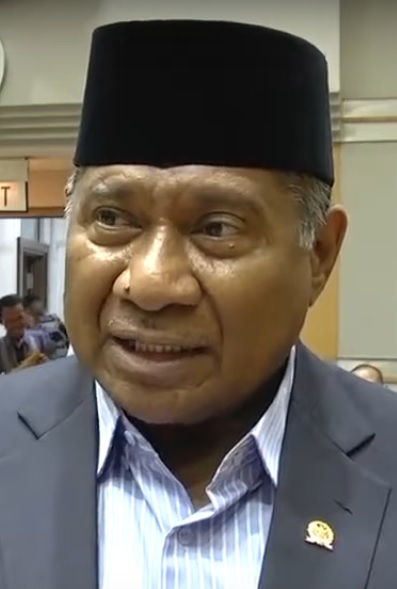
- Taher in 2019

Member of the People's Representative Council
- In office 1 October 2014 – 3 January 2021
- President: Joko Widodo
- Parliamentary group: National Mandate Party
- Constituency: Banten III (Tangerang, Tangerang Regency, and South Tangerang)
- In office 1 October 1997 – 1 October 1999
- President: Suharto; B. J. Habibie
- Parliamentary group: United Development Party
- Constituency: East Nusa Tenggara

Personal details
- Born: 9 February 1961 Lamakera, East Flores, East Nusa Tenggara, Indonesia
- Died: 3 January 2021 (aged 59) Jakarta, Indonesia
- Cause of death: COVID-19
- Party: National Mandate Party
- Other political affiliations: United Development Party
- Spouse: Sri Murniati
- Children: 5
- Education: Muhammadiyah University (S.H.); Tarumanagara University (M.Hum); Padjadjaran University (Dr.)

Muhammad Ali Taher Parasong (9 February 1961 – 3 January 2021) was an Indonesian politician from the National Mandate Party who was the member of the People's Representative Council from the Banten III electoral district from the 2014 Indonesian legislative election until his death.

== Early life and education ==
Taher was born in Lamakera, a small Muslim fishing village in the Christian-majority province of East Nusa Tenggara on 9 February 1961.

In the 1970s, Taher decided to migrate to Jakarta. With barely enough supplies, Taher departed a cargo boat when it reached Surabaya. From Surabaya, Taher departed to Jakarta, where he stayed in a house owned by his relatives. Taher then enrolled on an evening class elementary school in Slipi, where he graduated from the school in 1974.

After finishing his elementary education, Taher continued his junior high school education at the Muhammadiyah Junior High School in Slipi, where he graduated in 1977, and at the State High School No. 16 in West Jakarta, where he graduated in 1981.

From the high school, Taher entered the Muhammadiyah University. He studied at the university for six years until he graduated with a law degree (S.H.).

In 2002, Taher obtained magister degree in humanities after graduating from the Tarumanegara University. Ten years later, in 2012, Taher obtained doctorate from the Padjadjaran University.

== Career ==
After he graduated from the Muhammadiyah University, Taher began teaching as a lecturer in the university. Aside from the Muhammadiyah University, Taher also taught in several other universities, most notably the Muhammadiyah Economic Institute in Tangerang since 1993 and the YATSI Health Institute in Tangerang since 2006.

Aside from his academic career, Taher was also involved in health management, where he became the Vice General Manager of the Jakarta Islamic Hospital from 1991 until 2001. He also owned the RUSLAM Cempaka Putih Jaya and Catur Darma Utama company.

== Political career ==
Taher held his first political office when he was elected in 1997 as a member of the People's Representative Council from the East Nusa Tenggara electoral district. He ended his term in 1999.

After the restriction on political party was lifted in 1998, Taher joined the National Mandate Party. He held office as the party's deputy general secretary from 2005 until 2010, as the chair of the party from 2010 until 2020, and as a member of the party's advisory body from 2020 until his death. Due to his political affiliation, Taher was appointed an expert staff to Minister of Forestry Zulkifli Hasan, who was also a National Mandate Party member.

In 2004 and 2009, Taher ran as a candidate from the People's Representative Council from the Banten II (2004) and Banten III (2009) electoral district. Taher obtained 10,466 and 11,394 votes respectively. He did not win any seats in both elections.

In the 2014 Indonesian legislative election, Taher ran again as a candidate for the People's Representative Council from the Banten III electoral district. Taher obtained 62,479 votes in the election, and became a member of the People's Representative Council from 2014 until 2019. He was reelected in the 2019 Indonesian general election with 71,495 of the votes.

During both of his terms, Taher was assigned to the Committee VIII of the People's Representative Council, which handles religion, social affairs, and the empowerment of women. Taher became the chairman of the commission since 26 May 2016, replacing Saleh Partaonan Daulay.

=== Family resilience bill ===
Taher became notable when he, along with four other lawmakers, proposed the Family Resilience Bill. The bill, as described by The Jakarta Post, attempted to bring back the traditional way of managing households, with the husband responsible for fulfilling the family's welfare and needs while housewives are responsible for managing household affairs as best as possible.

Taher stated that the creation of the bill was based on the high divorce rate in Indonesia and that the bill is "necessary to be passed so that it can be an alternative solution to social problems faced by families". Taher remarked that controversy over the bill would be reasonable.

The bill was criticized by various activists and politicians, including by Indonesian Solidarity Party politician Tsamara Amany. Amany criticized the bill for its interference with the private lives of Indonesia's citizens. Commissioner of the National Commission for Women Bahrul Fuad opposed this bill and stated that this bill would cause regulatory overlaps. He also stated that several articles in the bill were inappropriate.

== Death ==
On 27 December 2020, Taher was diagnosed with COVID-19 during the COVID-19 pandemic in Indonesia. He opted to be treated at the Jakarta Islamic Hospital, reasoning that most of the COVID-19 patients brought to that hospital recovered. After his oxygen saturation briefly increased on 2 January, Taher's health deteriorated until he died at 14.00 on 3 January 2021.
