= Buol Island =

Island in Indonesia

Coordinates: 1°02′55″N 120°39′57″E

Bool Island (Indonesian: Pulau Buol; Dutch: Poelau Bul; also called Paligisan and Buol) is an island off the north-west coast of Sulawesi, Indonesia. It lies within Toli-Toli Regency of Central Sulawesi Province.
