= Buol, Tinombo Selatan =

Coordinates: 0°06′37″N 120°06′42″E

Buol (also, Bwool, Boeol) is a village in Tinombo Selatan district, Parigi Moutong Regency, Central Sulawesi, Indonesia.
