= Buol Regency =

Regency in Central Sulawesi, Indonesia

Buol Regency Kabupaten Buol
- Regency
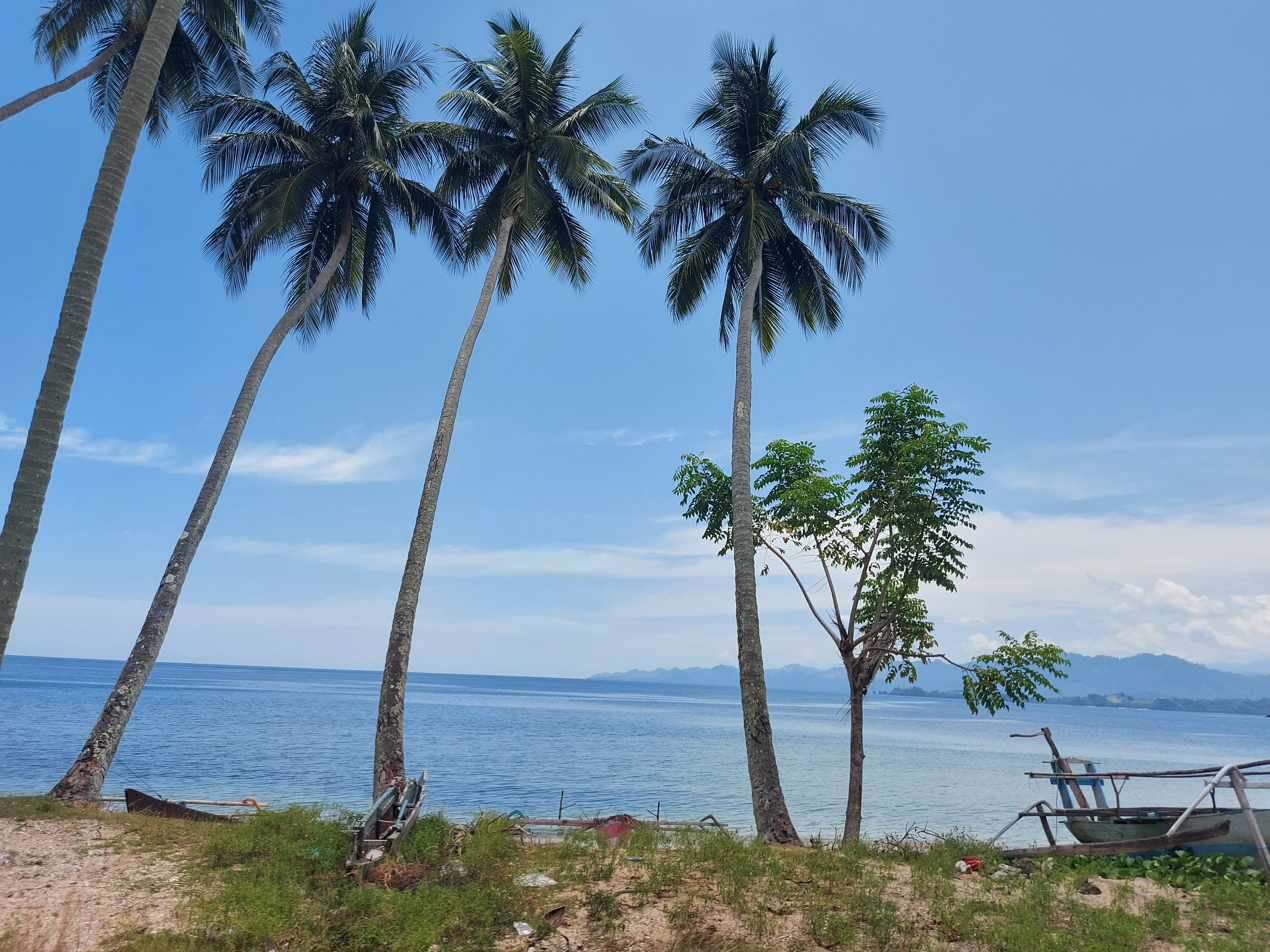
- A beach near Buol-Paleleh road

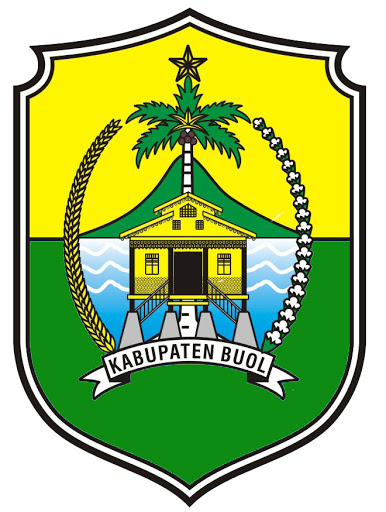
- Coat of arms

- Location within Central Sulawesi

- Location in Sulawesi and Indonesia Buol Regency (Indonesia)
- Coordinates: 1.010469°N 121.354250°E
- Country: Indonesia
- Province: Central Sulawesi
- Capital: Buol

Government
  - Regent: Risharyudi Triwibowo
  - Vice Regent: Mohammad Nasir Dj. Daimaroto

Area
  - Total: 4,043.57 km^{2} (1,561.23 sq mi)

Population (mid 2025 estimate)
  - Total: 165,490
  - Density: 40.927/km^{2} (106.00/sq mi)
- Time zone: UTC+8 (ICST)
- Area code: (+62) 445
- Website: buolkab.go.id

Buol Regency (Indonesian: Kabupaten Buol) is a regency (second-level administrative division) of Central Sulawesi Province of Indonesia. It was created on 4 October 1999, having previously been the eastern half of a larger Buol Tolitoli Regency. It covers an area of 4,043.57 km^{2}, and had a population of 132,330 at the 2010 Census; and 145,254 (comprising 74,624 males and 70,630 females) at the 2020 Census; the official estimate as of mid-2025 was 165,490 (comprising 84,800 males and 80,690 females). The administrative centre is the town of Buol, in Biau District.

== Administration ==
The Buol Regency was divided at 2020 into eleven districts (kecamatan), tabulated below with their areas and their populations at the 2010 Census and 2020 Census, together with the official estimates as of mid-2025. The table includes the locations of the district administrative centres, the number of administrative villages in each district (108 rural desa and 7 urban kelurahan in total), and its postal code.

Kode Wilayah	Name of District (kecamatan)	Area in km^{2}	Pop'n Census 2010	Pop'n Census 2020	Pop'n Estimate mid 2025	Admin centre	No. of villages	Post code
72.05.02	Lakea	208.55	9,700	11,040	12,840	Lakea II	7	94573
72.05.06	Biau	217.80	27,567	29,516	32,770	Leok II	7 ^{(a)}	94563
72.05.10	Karamat	153.10	8,296	9,734	11,800	Busak I	7	94572
72.05.01	Momunu	400.40	13,869	15,665	18,410	Lamadong I	16	94565
72.05.07	Tiloan	1,437.70	9,955	9,384	9,920	Air Terang	9	94566
72.05.03	Bokat	196.10	12,609	15,045	17,120	Bokat	15	94564
72.05.08	Bukal	355.52	13,485	14,746	16,300	Unone	14	94571
72.05.04	Bunobogu	327.15	8,814	9,764	11,060	Bunobogu Selatan	10	94568
72.05.09	Gadung	160.38	11,337	11,912	13,670	Bulagidun	11	94515
72.05.05	Paleleh ^{(b)}	386.19	11,323	12,342	14,290	Paleleh	12	94569
72.05.11	Paleleh Barat (West Paleleh)	200.68	5,375	6,106	7,300	Timbulon	7	94574
	Totals	4,043.57	132,330	145,254	165,490	Buol	115	

Notes: (a) comprising all 7 kelurahan (urban villages) - Leok I, Leok II, Bugis, Buol, Kali, Kulango and Kumaligon. (b) including seven offshore islands.

== Demography ==
The Buol-speaking people live in the districts which now comprise the Buol regency (in Central Sulawesi Province) which borders the Gorontalo province. Formerly mountain dwellers, the Buol now live in scattered villages on the central part of the northern peninsula, to the north-west of the Gorontalo province. The history of the Buol region is one of the rise and fall of small kingdoms and their occasional confederation into larger entities for defense and conquest. Sometimes, the Buol people are treated as a subgroup of the Gorontalo people group due to cultural and linguistic similarities. The Buol language is part of a larger linguistic grouping called the Gorontalic family which also includes the Bintauna, Kaidipang, Bolango, Gorontalo, Lolak and Suwawa languages.
