= Buol (town) =

- Town
- Location within Sulawesi
- Coordinates: 1°10′N 121°26′E
- Country: Indonesia
- Province: Central Sulawesi
- Regency: Buol Regency
- Time zone: UTC+8 (+8)

Buol (also, Bwool, Boeol) is a town and the administrative centre of the Regency of Buol, in Central Sulawesi Province of Indonesia.

== Climate ==
Buol has a tropical rainforest climate (Af) with moderate rainfall from August to October and heavy rainfall in the remaining months.

Climate data for Buol
Month	Jan	Feb	Mar	Apr	May	Jun	Jul	Aug	Sep	Oct	Nov	Dec	Year
Mean daily maximum °C (°F)	30.7 (87.3)	30.7 (87.3)	31.0 (87.8)	31.4 (88.5)	31.6 (88.9)	30.9 (87.6)	30.6 (87.1)	31.4 (88.5)	31.6 (88.9)	32.2 (90.0)	31.7 (89.1)	31.2 (88.2)	31.3 (88.3)
Daily mean °C (°F)	26.7 (80.1)	26.7 (80.1)	26.9 (80.4)	27.1 (80.8)	27.5 (81.5)	26.8 (80.2)	26.5 (79.7)	27.0 (80.6)	26.9 (80.4)	27.4 (81.3)	27.3 (81.1)	27.1 (80.8)	27.0 (80.6)
Mean daily minimum °C (°F)	22.7 (72.9)	22.7 (72.9)	22.8 (73.0)	22.9 (73.2)	23.4 (74.1)	22.8 (73.0)	22.4 (72.3)	22.6 (72.7)	22.3 (72.1)	22.6 (72.7)	22.9 (73.2)	23.0 (73.4)	22.8 (73.0)
Average rainfall mm (inches)	269 (10.6)	193 (7.6)	174 (6.9)	165 (6.5)	147 (5.8)	172 (6.8)	137 (5.4)	118 (4.6)	120 (4.7)	114 (4.5)	158 (6.2)	176 (6.9)	1,943 (76.5)
Source: Climate-Data.org
