= List of vice governors of Papua =

List of vice governors papua

The list of vice governors of Papua includes all Vice Governors of the Indonesian states of Western New Guinea in the west of the island of New Guinea. Currently, the Vice Governor is the second-highest executive official in the state governments of Indonesian Papua.

No.	Photo	Vice-governor	Took office	Left office	Governor	R
Vice Governor of West Irian (1963-1964)
1		Pamoedji	1 May 1963	1 February 1964	Eliezer Jan Bonay	
2		Agus Subekti	1 February 1964	1 July 1965	Eliezer Jan Bonay (1964); Frans Kaisiepo (1964-1965)	
3		Mohammad Sarwono	1 July 1967	1 March 1973	Frans Kaisiepo (1967-1973)	
Vice Governor of Irian Jaya (1973-2000)
3		Mohammad Sarwono	1 March 1973	29 June 1973	Frans Kaisiepo	
4		Jan Mamoribo	29 June 1973	19 October 1976	Acub Zainal (1973-1975); Soetran (1975-1977)	
—		Elias Paprindey	11 March 1977	22 November 1980	Soetran (1977-1980)	
5		Izaac Hindom	22 November 1980	4 August 1982	Soetran (1980-1981); Busiri Suryowinoto (1981-1982)	
6		Sugiyono	27 March 1983	27 August 1987	Izaac Hindom	
7		Poedjono Pranyoto	27 August 1987	11 May 1988	Izaac Hindom	
8		Soedardjat Nataatmadja	8 February 1989	26 May 1993	Barnabas Suebu (1989-1993); Jacob Pattipi (1993)	
9a		Basyir Bachtiar	21 September 1993	1998	Jacob Pattipi (1993-1998); Freddy Numberi (1998-2000)	
10a		John Djopari	1998	15 April 2000	Jacob Pattipi (1993-1998); Freddy Numberi (1998-2000)	
9b		Herman Monim	7 October 1996 (Note: Both assumed office as the Governor of Central Irian Jaya (Monim) and West Irian Jaya (Atururi) on 12 October 1996. However, both returned to their office as Vice Governor after the province was dissolved by Papua's parliament four days later.)	15 April 2000	Jacob Pattipi (1993-1998); Freddy Numberi (1998-2000)	
9c		Abraham Octavianus Atururi	7 October 1996	15 April 2000	Jacob Pattipi (1993-1998); Freddy Numberi (1998-2000)	
Vice Governor of Papua (2000-now)
11		Constant Karma	23 November 2000	19 December 2005	Jacobus Perviddya Solossa	
12		Alex Hesegem	25 July 2006	25 Juli 2011	Barnabas Suebu	
13		Klemen Tinal	9 April 2013	26 February 2018	Lukas Enembe	
13		Klemen Tinal	5 September 2018	21 May 2021	Lukas Enembe	
