= Governor of Papua =

Governor of Papua is the regional head who holds the provincial government in Papua together with the Deputy Governor of Papua. The Governor and Deputy Governor of Papua are elected through general elections which are held every 5 years. The current governor of Papua is Mathius Fakhiri.

The following is a list of the governors of Papua, including when they were still called West Irian and Irian Jaya.

No.	Photo	Governor	Took office	Left office	Vice Governor	R
Governor of West Irian in exile (1956–1963)
1		Zainal Abidin Syah (1912–1967)	23 September 1956	end of 1961		
2		Pamoedji	end of 1961	1 May 1963		
Governor of West Irian (1963–1973)
3		Eliëzer Jan Bonaÿ (1923–1990)	1 May 1963	26 November 1964	Pamoedji	
4		Frans Kaisiepo (1921–1979)	26 November 1964	1 March 1973	Agus Subekti (1964–1965)	
4		Frans Kaisiepo (1921–1979)	26 November 1964	1 March 1973	Mohammad Sarwono (1967–1973)	
Governor of Irian Jaya (1973–2000)
4		Frans Kaisiepo (1921–1979)	1 March 1973	29 June 1973	Mohammad Sarwono (1973)	
5		Acub Zainal (1926–2008)	29 June 1973	31 March 1975	Jan Mamoribo (1973–1976)	
—		Soetran (1921–1987)	31 March 1975	12 August 1975	Jan Mamoribo (1973–1976)	
6		Soetran (1921–1987)	12 August 1975	4 September 1980	Jan Mamoribo (1973–1976)	
6		Soetran (1921–1987)	12 August 1975	4 September 1980	Elias Paprindey (acting, 1977–1980)	
—		Soetran (1921–1987)	4 September 1980	20 January 1981	Elias Paprindey (acting, 1977–1980)	
—		Soetran (1921–1987)	4 September 1980	20 January 1981	Izaac Hindom (1980–1982)	
7		Busiri Suryowinoto (1926–1982)	20 January 1981	4 August 1982	Izaac Hindom (1980–1982)	
—		Izaac Hindom (1934–2009)	4 August 1982	12 November 1982	none	
8		Izaac Hindom (1934–2009)	12 November 1982	18 November 1987	Sugiyono (1983–1985)	
8		Izaac Hindom (1934–2009)	12 November 1982	18 November 1987	Poedjono Pranyoto (1985–1988)	
—		Izaac Hindom (1934–2009)	18 November 1987	13 April 1988	Poedjono Pranyoto (1985–1988)	
9		Barnabas Suebu (1945–)	13 April 1988	13 April 1993	Poedjono Pranyoto (1985–1988)	
9		Barnabas Suebu (1945–)	13 April 1988	13 April 1993	Soedardjat Nataatmadja (1988–1993)	
10		Jacob Pattipi (1939–2001)	13 April 1993	9 April 1998	Soedardjat Nataatmadja (1988–1993)	
10		Jacob Pattipi (1939–2001)	13 April 1993	9 April 1998	Basyir Bachtiar (1993–1998); John Djopari (1998–2000); Herman Monim (1996–1998); Abraham Octavianus Atururi (1998–2000)	
11		Freddy Numberi (1947–)	9 April 1998	1 January 2000	Basyir Bachtiar (1993–1998); John Djopari (1998–2000); Herman Monim (1996–1998); Abraham Octavianus Atururi (1998–2000)	(Note: Also held office as the Minister of State Minister of State Apparatus Utilization since 29 October 1999.)
Governor of Papua (2000–present)
11		Freddy Numberi (1947–)	1 January 2000	15 April 2000	John Djopari	
—		Musiran Darmosuwito	15 April 2000	23 November 2000	John Djopari	
12		Jacobus Perviddya Solossa (1949–2005)	23 November 2000	23 November 2005	Constant Karma	
—		Jacobus Perviddya Solossa (1949–2005)	23 November 2005	19 December 2005	Constant Karma	
—		Andi Baso Bassaleng (1947–2013)	20 December 2005	9 January 2006	none	
—		Sodjuangon Situmorang (1949–)	9 January 2006	25 July 2006	none	
13		Barnabas Suebu (1945–)	25 July 2006	25 July 2011	Alex Hesegem	
—		Syamsul Arif Rivai (1952–)	25 July 2011	1 November 2012	none	
—		Constant Karma (1954–)	5 November 2012	9 April 2013	none	
14		Lukas Enembe (1967–2023)	9 April 2013	9 April 2018 (campaign leave on 26 February 2018 to 9 April 2018)	Klemen Tinal	
—		Soedarmo (1956–)	26 February 2018	9 April 2018	none	
—		Soedarmo (1956–)	10 April 2018	5 September 2018	none	
(14)		Lukas Enembe (1967–2023)	5 September 2018	5 September 2023 (Non-active from 11 January 2023 to 5 September 2023	Klemen Tinal (2018–2021)	
—		Ridwan Rumasukun (1964–)	11 January 2023	5 August 2024	none	
—		Ramses Limbong (1965–)	5 August 2024	7 July 2025	none	
—		Agus Fatoni (1972–)	7 July 2025	8 October 2025	none	
15		Mathius Fakhiri (1968–)	8 October 2025	Incumbent	Aryoko Rumaropen	
