= Herman Monim =

Papuan politician

Governor of Central Irian Jaya (acting)
- In office 12 October 1999 – 16 October 1999
- President: B. J. Habibie
- Preceded by: office established
- Succeeded by: Ribka Haluk (as Governor of Central Papua)

Vice Governor of Irian Jaya
- In office 7 October 1996 – 12 October 1999 Serving with Basyir Bachtiar (until 1998), John Djopari (from 1998), and Abraham Octavianus Atururi
- Governor: Jacob Pattipi; Freddy Numberi
- Preceded by: Poedjono Pranyoto
- Succeeded by: Constant Karma

Personal details
- Born: 1938 or 1939
- Died: 9 August 2014 (age 75 or 76)

Herman Monim (1938/1939 – 9 August 2014) was an Indonesian politician who served as the Vice Governor of Irian Jaya from 1996 until 1999, and as the acting Governor of Central Irian Jaya for four days, from 12 until 16 October 1999.

== Life and career ==
Before being appointed as the Vice Governor of Irian Jaya, Herman Monim worked in the provincial government as the Head of Village Government Development Bureau and as assistant to the Governor of Irian Jaya for the first territory (Jayapura, Jayawijaya, Paniai, and Merauke).

Monim was inaugurated as the Vice Governor of Irian Jaya on 7 October 1996. Monim was tasked to assist the governor in economic affairs and in governing the second territory (Biak-Numfor, Yapen-Waropen and Paniai). Monim's office was initially located in Jayapura, but later moved to Timika, the de facto capital of the second region. However, due to continuous riots and his inability to face "highland people" (a term used to describe differing Papuan communities, in contrast to "coastal people"), he only stayed in Timika for a month before returning to Jayapura. During his tenure as vice governor, Herman held the office as the acting Regent of Nabire from 1998 until 1999.

After the fall of President Suharto, his successor, President B. J. Habibie, enacted Law No. 45 of 1999 on 4 October 1999, which effectively transformed the second territory into the province of Central Irian Jaya. Monim was inaugurated as Governor eight days later. However, the formation of the province was opposed by Irian Jaya's parliament, and on 16 October they enacted a decree which rejected the law, effectively deposing Monim from his office. The government accepted the parliament's decision and delayed the formation of the province. However, riots between the supporters and the opponents of the province continued following the delay. The riot escalated into a five-day civil war in 2003, causing five deaths. The civil war ended on 27 November 2003 when the government announced the dissolution of the province. A peace accord between the two factions was signed on the next day.

In an interview on 2019, the Regent of Nabire, Isaias Douw, blamed Monim's failure on his origins. According to Douw, Monim's coastal background made him not accepted by rural highland communities of Central Irian Jaya.
