= John Siffy Mirin =

Indonesian politician (1978–2021)

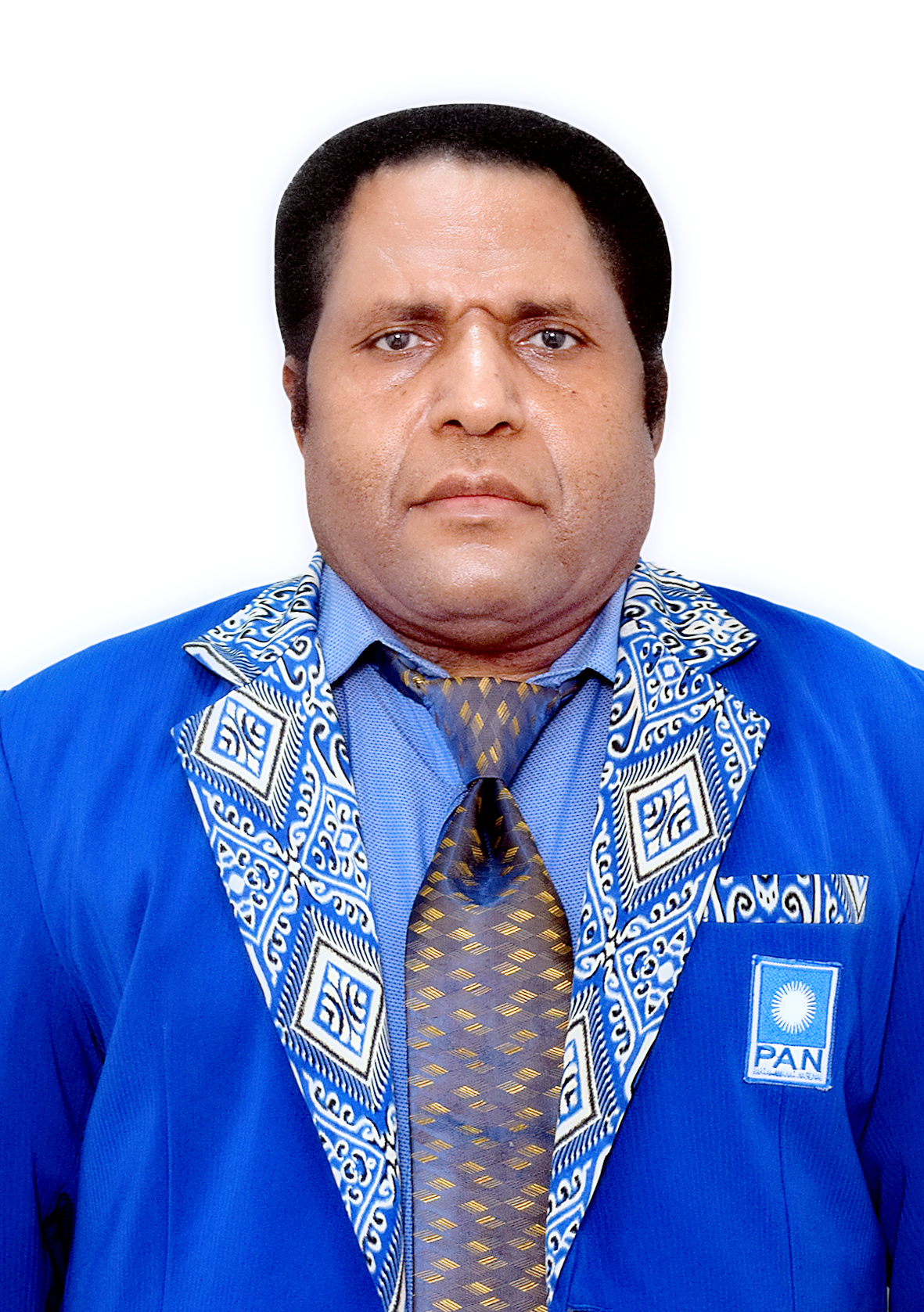

Member of the House of Representatives
- In office 23 May 2018 – 3 July 2021; Interim replacement until 30 September 2019
- Preceded by: Jamaluddin Jafar
- Succeeded by: Paulus Ubruangge
- Constituency: Papua

Personal details
- Born: 30 September 1978 Korupun, Yahukimo, Papua, Indonesia
- Died: 3 July 2021 (aged 42) Jakarta, Indonesia
- Party: PAN
- Education: Sam Ratulangi University

John Siffy Mirin (30 September 1978 – 3 July 2021) was an Indonesian politician from Papua from the National Mandate Party. He became a member of the House of Representatives representing Papua at-large electoral district from 2018 until his death in 2021.

== Early life and education ==
Mirin was born on 30 September 1978 in Korupun, a district located at the Yahukimo Regency of Papua. Mirin studied at the Korupun Presidential Elementary School from 1987 until 1992. He moved to Wamena after graduating from elementary school, and entered the Saint Thomas junior high school and high school, respectively. After finishing his high school education in 1995, John migrated to North Sulawesi, where he attended the Sam Ratulangi University. He graduated from the university in 2003 with a degree in governance studies.

== Political career ==
Mirin returned to Papua after finishing his university education. He joined the National Mandate Party (PAN) in 2003 and became a member of the executive council of the party's Papua branch in 2015. As the party supported governor Lukas Enembe and vice governor Klemen Tinal, Mirin became a member of the pair's campaign team during the gubernatorial elections of 2013 and 2018.

Mirin decided to run for the People's Representative Council from the Papua electoral district in the 2014 Indonesian legislative election. Although he was not elected, he won the second most votes for a PAN candidate in the electoral district. When PAN MP from Papua Jamaluddin Jafar resigned to run for local elections, Mirin was called to take his place and was subsequently sworn in as a replacement member on 23 May 2018. He was seated in Commission V, which handles transport, telecommunications, public works, public housing, village development and disadvantaged areas. While serving in the commission, Mirin urged the authorities to prevent the inflation of public transport price during the mudik season.

Mirin ran again in the 2019 Indonesian general election and won a seat in the People's Representative Council. In his second term, Mirin moved to Commission II, which handles domestic governance, regional autonomy, state apparatus and agrarian affairs.

== Personal life and death ==
Mirin was married to Evelline Yella Kindage and had two children.

Mirin died on 3 July 2021, at the Gatot Soebroto Army Hospital of complications from COVID-19. He had been diagnosed positive with the virus a week before his death, and was brought to the Gatot Soebroto Army Hospital a day before.
