= 2024 Papua gubernatorial election =

- 27 November 2024
- Turnout: 72.69% (▼14.55pp)
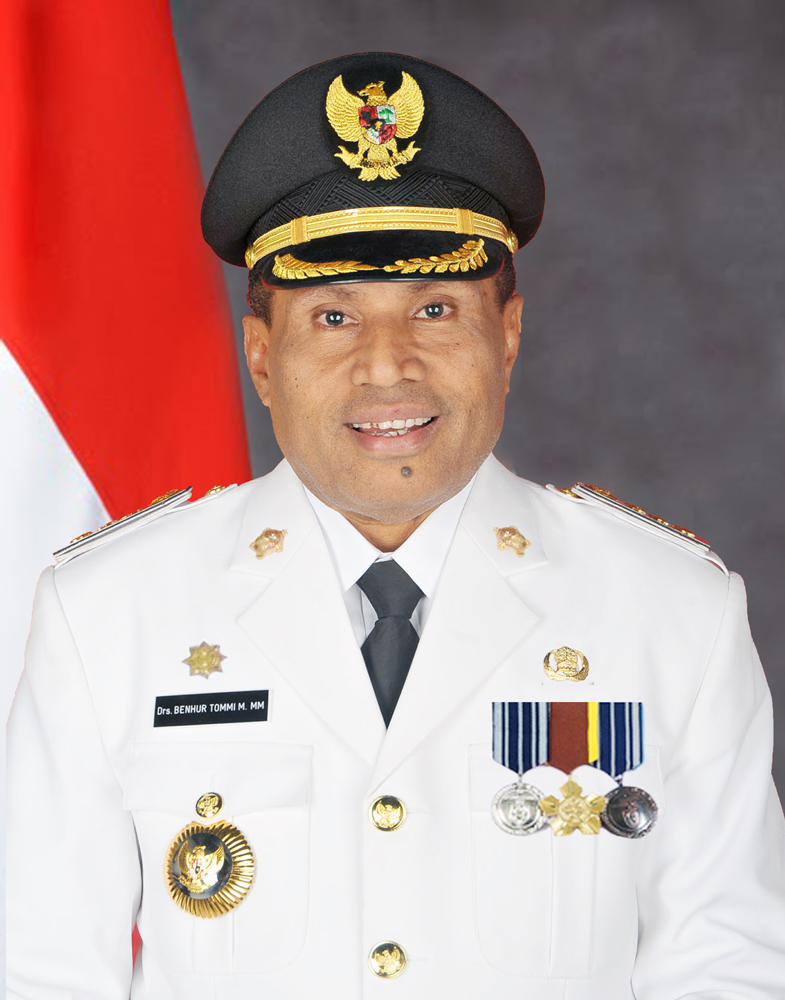

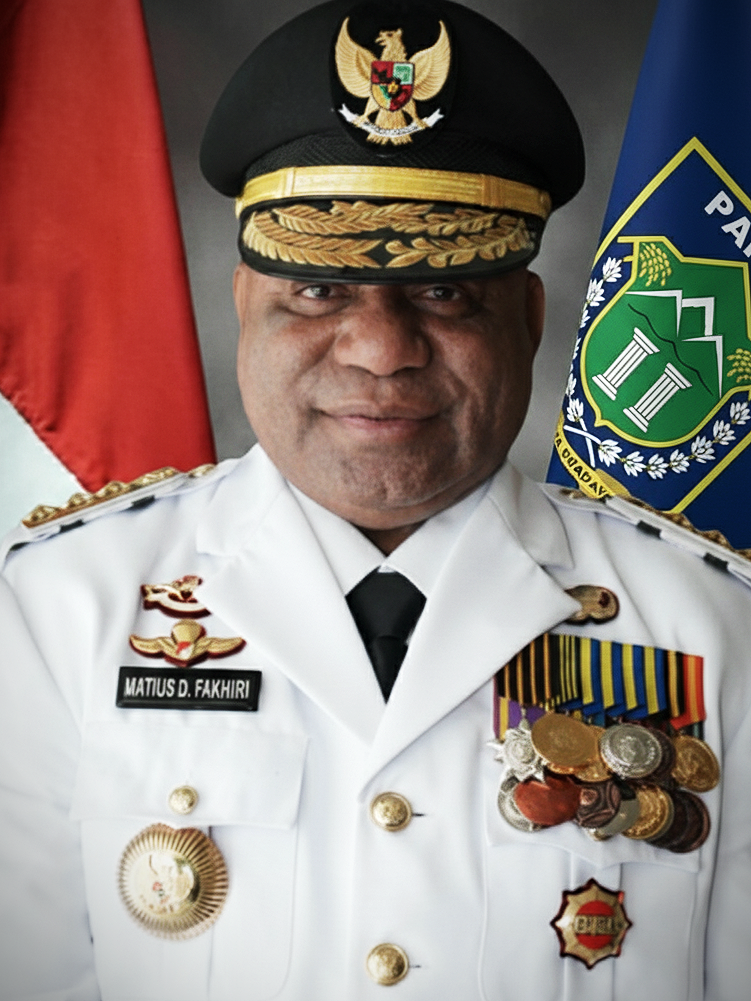
Candidate	Benhur Tomi Mano	Mathius Fakhiri
Party	PDI-P	Independent
Alliance	–	KIM Plus
Running mate	Yermias Bisai	Aryoko Rumaropen
Popular vote	269,970	262,777
Percentage	50.68%	49.32%
- Results by district
Governor before election
Ridwan Rumasukun (acting)
Independent
Election annulled
Repeat elections ordered

The 2024 Papua gubernatorial election was held on 27 November 2024 as part of nationwide local elections to elect the governor of Papua province for a five-year term. The previous election was held in 2018. It was the first gubernatorial election in Papua since the province's partition in 2022. Former Jayapura Mayor Benhur Tomi Mano of the Indonesian Democratic Party of Struggle (PDI-P) secured 50% of the vote. His sole opponent, Mathius Fakhiri, received 49%. After the election, a dispute arose over the eligibility of PDI-P vice gubernatorial nominee Yermias Bisai. As a result, the Constitution Court annulled the election on 24 February 2025 and ordered a repeat election.

== Electoral system ==
The election, like other local elections in 2024, follow the first-past-the-post system where the candidate with the most votes wins the election, even if they do not win a majority. It is possible for a candidate to run uncontested, in which case the candidate is still required to win a majority of votes "against" an "empty box" option. Should the candidate fail to do so, the election will be repeated on a later date.

== Candidates ==
According to electoral regulations, in order to qualify for the election, candidates were required to secure support from a political party or a coalition of parties controlling 9 seats (20 percent of all seats) in the Papua House of Representatives (DPRP). With 10 seats from the 2024 legislative election, Golkar is the only party eligible to nominate a candidate without forming a coalition with other parties. Candidates may alternatively demonstrate support to run as an independent in form of photocopies of identity cards, which in Papua's case corresponds to 72,784 copies. One candidate, Agustinus Donald Ohee, registered to run as an independent, but failed to provide sufficient proof of support by the set deadline.

The previously elected governor, Lukas Enembe, had been elected to office twice, was arrested by the Corruption Eradication Commission during his second term, and died in December 2023.

=== Potential ===
The following are individuals who have either been publicly mentioned as a potential candidate by a political party in the DPRP, publicly declared their candidacy with press coverage, or considered as a potential candidate by media outlets:

- Mathius Awoitauw (Nasdem), regent of Jayapura Regency (2012–2022).

- Boy Markus Dawir (Demokrat), member of DPRP (as running mate).

- Benhur Tomi Mano (PDI-P), former two-term mayor of Jayapura, elected member of the House of Representatives.

== Political map ==
Following the 2024 Indonesian legislative election, eleven political parties are represented in the DPRP:

Political parties	Seat count
Party of Functional Groups (Golkar)	10 / 45
Indonesian Democratic Party of Struggle (PDI-P)	7 / 45
NasDem Party	7 / 45
National Awakening Party (PKB)	3 / 45
National Mandate Party (PAN)	3 / 45
Prosperous Justice Party (PKS)	3 / 45
Democratic Party (Demokrat)	3 / 45
Great Indonesia Movement Party (Gerindra)	3 / 45
Perindo Party	3 / 45
Indonesian Solidarity Party (PSI)	2 / 45
United Development Party (PPP)	1 / 45

== Results ==
Candidate	Running mate	Party	Votes	%
Benhur Tomi Mano	Yermias Bisai	Indonesian Democratic Party of Struggle	269,970	50.68
Mathius Fakhiri	Aryoko Rumaropen	Independent	262,777	49.32
Total			532,747	100.00
Valid votes			532,747	97.59
Invalid/blank votes			13,132	2.41
Total votes			545,879	100.00
Registered voters/turnout			750,959	72.69
Source: KPU

== Aftermath ==
Following the election, Mathius Fakhiri claimed that Yermias Bisai failed to submit a non-conviction certificate required to be an eligible candidate. The Papua General Elections Commission declared that Yermias Bisai's candidacy was valid and certified the election result. However, on 24 February 2025, the Constitutional Court invalidated the election and ordered a repeat election within 180 days. The courts also declared that Yermias Bisai would be ineligible to contest the new polls, with parties that previously backed his candidacy being required to submit a new pair of candidates.
