= Alex Hesegem =

Indonesian politician (1957–2021)

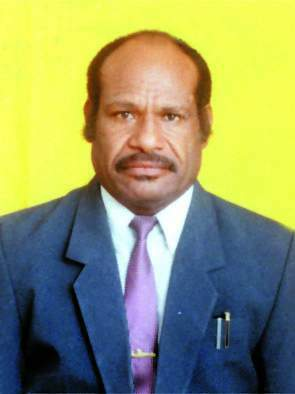

Vice Governor of Papua
- In office 25 July 2006 – 25 July 2011
- Governor: Barnabas Suebu
- Preceded by: Constant Karma
- Succeeded by: Klemen Tinal

Member of the People's Representative Council
- In office 27 April 2001 – 1 October 2004
- Preceded by: Jacobus Perviddya Solossa
- Parliamentary group: Golkar
- Constituency: Jayawijaya

Member of the People's Consultative Assembly
- In office 1 October 1999 – 1 October 2004
- Parliamentary group: Regional Delegates (1999 – 2001); Golkar (2001 – 2004)
- Constituency: Papua

Member of the Irian Jaya Regional People's Representative Council
- In office 18 July 1997 – September 1999
- Parliamentary group: Golkar

Personal details
- Born: 14 July 1957 Wamena, Centraal Nieuw-Guinea, Dutch New Guinea
- Died: 20 June 2021 (aged 63) Jayapura, Papua, Indonesia
- Party: Golkar (until December 2010); NasDem (December 2010–2019); Berkarya Party (since 2019)
- Spouse: Amelia Infandi
- Children: Elsye Hesegem; Samuel Minyeak Hesegem; Margaretha Eragape Hesegem; Dorkas Aleyda Aksamina Hesegem; Izhak Dortheus Hesegem
- Parent: Jan Mamoribo (stepfather) (father)

Alex Hesegem (14 July 1957 – 20 June 2021) was an Indonesian politician. He was a member of parliament from 2001 until 2004 and the Vice Governor of Papua from 2006 until 2011.

== Early life ==
Alex Hesegem was born on 14 July 1957 in Wamena, the capital of present-day Jayawijaya Regency. When he was born, his parents handed him over to Arnold Sawaki, an evangelist who was conducting a mission in Kurima, a small village in the Yahukimo Regency. Several years later, he was adopted by Jan Mamoribo, a Protestant prelate who was visiting Kurima. Mamoribo then brought him to Jayapura and enrolled him at an elementary school owned by the Paulus Christian Education Foundation.

While he was in elementary school, his stepfather was elected as the Speaker of the Irian Jaya (now Papua) Regional People's Representative Council in 1971. Two years later, Mamoribo became the Vice Governor of Irian Jaya, and along with it he graduated from elementary school. He continued his education at a junior high school and finished in 1976. However, not long after his graduation from junior high school, his father died in Jakarta after a work trip to New York.

After his father's death, Hesegem attended the Higher Administration Education Course and graduated from the course in 1981. He then pursued further education at the Ottow and Geisler Academy for Economics for six years, but dropped out in 2000. He studied at the Entrepreneur University of Indonesia and graduated with a Bachelor of Economics degree in 2003.

== Bureaucratic career ==
A year after he graduated from junior high school, Hesegem began to work as an honorary employee at Irian Jaya's regional secretariat. After working for seven years, he became a civil servant candidate and was promoted to a full-time civil servant in 1986.

== Political career ==
Hesegem entered the Indonesian Youth Renewal League — the youth wing of the Golkar party — in 1983. He was appointed a deputy secretary inside the league in the same year and rose through the ranks to become the secretary of the league's advisory body in 1994. He became a member of the Golkar party's Papuan Central Committee in 1993 and became its deputy secretary in 1997.

Hesegem was nominated as a candidate for the Irian Jaya Regional People's Representative Council (the province's parliament) in the 1997 Indonesian legislative election. He was elected as a council member and was sworn into office on 18 July 1997. Several months later, Hesegem was nominated by the province's parliament as a regional delegate to the People's Consultative Assembly. His nomination was approved and he was installed on 1 October 1999. During his tenure as a regional delegate, Hesegem advocated for the formation of a separate parliamentary group for regional delegates.

After serving as regional delegate for two years, Hesegem was appointed a member of the People's Representative Council from the Jayawijaya electoral district on 27 April 2001, replacing Jacobus Perviddya Solossa who was elected as the Governor of Papua a year before. Hesegem was seated in Commission IV of the People's Representative Council, which handles law, human rights, and security. He was involved in the discussion of various legislative pieces, such as the bill on water resources, formation of the East Sulawesi Province, and the special autonomy of Papua. His term ended on 1 October 2004.

== Vice Governor of Papua ==
Hesegem became the running mate of Barnabas Suebu, a former governor and ambassador, in the 2006 Papua gubernatorial election. The pair won the election with 354,763 votes, defeating the second-placed Lukas Enembe and Arobi Aituwarau with a thin margin of 21,134 votes. Enembe disputed the results, stating that he won the election instead and requesting the Supreme Court to recount the votes. Enembe's legal representatives stated that Suebu and Hesegem had conducted vote-rigging in the Yahukimo Regency. The Supreme Court rejected the dispute and declared Suebu and Hesegem as the definitive winner. A similar allegation were later brought by the third-place pair John Ibo and Pascalis Cossi, but was met by the same decision from the Supreme Court. Hesegem was then sworn in as the vice governor of Papua on 25 July 2006.

Three months after he assumed the office of vice governor, Hesegem led a mediation to resolve a tribal conflict between the Central Kwamki Lama and Upper Kwamki Lama, both of which were localities in Timika. During the mediation process, both parties demanded compensation from each other. The mediation resulted in a peace treaty between the two parties and a 500-meter-wide demarcation line was set between Central Kwamki Lama and Upper Kwamki Lama. However, when a similar conflict occurred again in 2007, Hesegem called for the police force to arrest provocateurs that caused the conflict to re-occur. He also elaborated that the provocateurs were those who signed the peace treaty earlier in 2006.

Hesegem and Suebu moved from their original party — Golkar and the Indonesian Democratic Party of Struggle respectively — to the NasDem Party on 2 December 2010. Hesegem became the chairman of the Papua's branch of the party.

== Later life ==
After ending his term on 25 July 2011, Hesegem was rumored to ran again as the running mate of Suebu. The possibility of nominating the pairs were discussed internally by several parties inside Papua's parliament. However, it was later revealed that Hesegem refused to run again with Suebu, as the two had been seen experiencing disagreements with each other after Hesegem refused to attend the handover ceremony from Suebu to an acting office holder. Hesegem then decided to ran in the next gubernatorial election as a governor candidate. Although he initially announce deputy speaker Komaruddin Watubun as his vice governor candidate, the Papuan parliament barred him from becoming a candidate in the election as he was not an indigenous Papuan. Hesegem eventually registered with former head of forestry bureau Marthen Kayoi as his running mate. Hesegem only obtained 72,120 votes — 3 percent of the votes — and lost the election to his former opponent, Lukas Enembe, who this time ran with Klemen Tinal. Although Hesegem and other losing candidates refused to ratify the results, the General Elections Commission declared Lukas and Tinal as the winner of the election.

Hesegem ran as a candidate for the People's Representative Council in the 2014 general election. He lost in this election and moved to the Berkarya Party several years later. He ran again for the People's Representative Council in the next election, but lost again.

== Death ==
Hesegem died on 20 June 2021, at the Jayapura Hospital after being treated for three days due to complications from diabetes and pneumonia. He also had tested positive for COVID-19. He was planned to be buried at the Trikora Heroes Cemetery in Jayapura.

== Personal life ==
Hesegem was a Protestant Christian. He was married to Amelia Infandi. The couple had five children named Elsye Hesegem, Samuel Minyeak Hesegem, Margaretha Eragape Hesegem, Dorkas Aleyda Aksamina Hesegem, and Izhak Dortheus Hesegem.

== Awards ==
- Development Medal (Indonesian: Satyalancana Pembangunan) (12 July 2011)
