= Dominggus Mandacan =

Indonesian politician

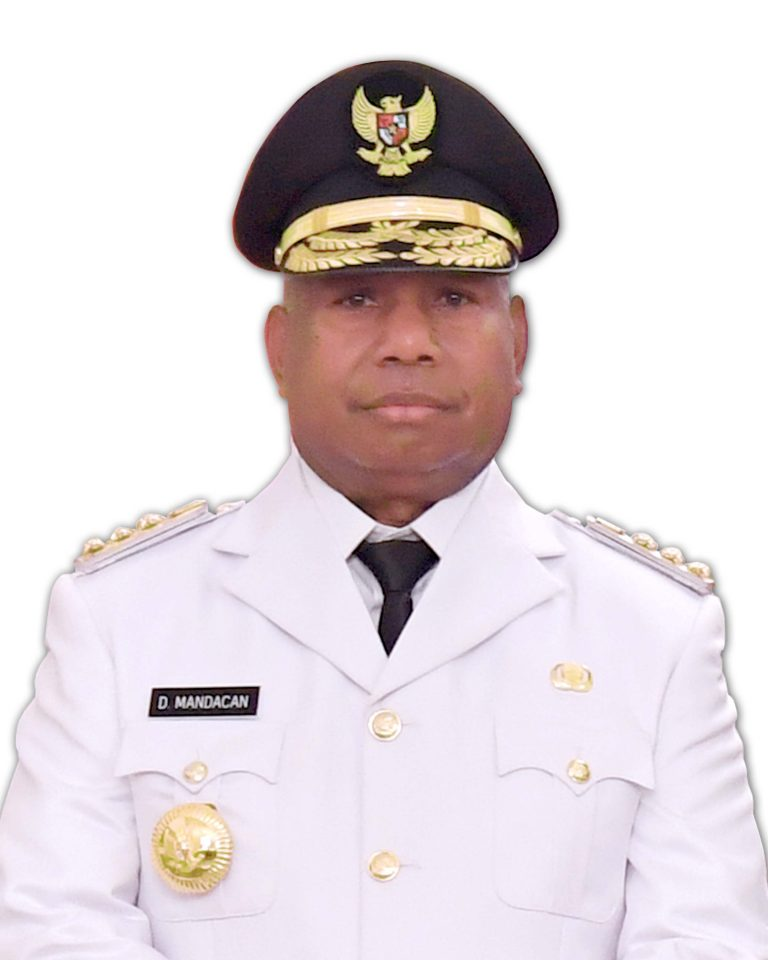
- Official portrait, 2025

2nd Governor of West Papua
- Incumbent
- Assumed office 20 February 2025
- Deputy: Mohamad Lakotani
- Preceded by: Ali Baham Temongmere (acting)
- In office 12 May 2017 – 12 May 2022
- Deputy: Mohamad Lakotani
- Preceded by: Abraham Octavianus Atururi
- Succeeded by: Paulus Waterpauw (acting)

1st Regent of Arfak Mountains
- In office 22 April 2013 – 24 April 2015
- Governor: Abraham Octavianus Atururi
- Preceded by: Office established
- Succeeded by: Yusak Wabia (acting)

6th regent of Manokwari
- In office 2000–2010
- Governor: Irian Jaya Governor: Jacobus Perviddya Solossa; West Papua Governor: Abraham Octavianus Atururi (act.); Timbul Pudjianto (act.); Abraham Octavianus Atururi
- Deputy: Dominggus Buiney
- Preceded by: Mulyono
- Succeeded by: Bastian Salabay

Personal details
- Born: Dominggus Mandacan; 16 December 1959 (age 66) Manokwari, Netherlands New Guinea
- Citizenship: Indonesian
- Party: NasDem
- Other political affiliations: KIM Plus (2024–present)

Dominggus Mandacan is an Indonesian politician who is the governor of West Papua, serving since February 2025 after his first term from 2017 to 2022.

Surabaya Mayor Tri Rismaharini traveled to the province to help campaign for Mandacan and his running mate, Mohammad Lakotani, and the Mandacan-Lakotani ticket had the support of both the Indonesian Democratic Party of Struggle and the NasDem Party.

He was the son of Lodewijk Mandatjan, the leader of Arfak tribe, and alongside Barents Mandatjan, were early figures of Indonesian Nationalist in Papua who was involved in red-white flag raising ceremony in Borarsi, Manokwari, before switching side to support Papuan Independence. During 1963–1969, He alongside Permenas Ferry Awom, former member of PVK, lead a group of early OPM waged a guerrilla warfare against Indonesian forces. These events were collectively known as Arfai incident. He surrendered and switch to Indonesian side, and receive titular military title of Major from Indonesian Army. A police hospital, RS Bhayangkara Polda Papua Barat, was also named after him.
