= Lukas Enembe Stadium =

Stadium in Papua, Indonesia

- Stadion Lukas Enembe
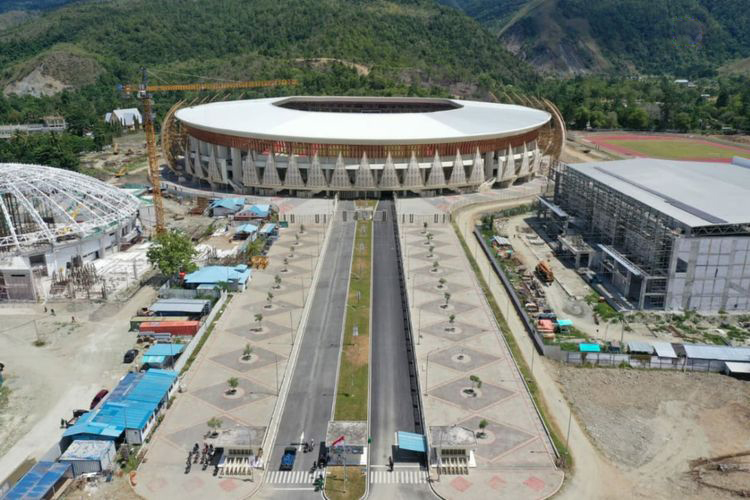

- Location in Western New Guinea
- Former names: Papua Bangkit Stadium
- Location: Nolokla, East Sentani, Jayapura Regency, Papua, Indonesia
- Coordinates: 2.579029°S 140.573534°E
- Capacity: 40,263
- Surface: Zoysia Matrella

Construction
- Opened: 23 October 2020
- Cost: IDR 1.3 trillion

Tenants
- Persipura Jayapura; PSBS Biak (2025)

The Lukas Enembe Stadium (Indonesian: Stadion Lukas Enembe), formerly known as Papua Bangkit Stadium (Indonesian: Stadion Papua Bangkit, lit. 'Rising Papua Stadium'), is a multi-purpose stadium located within the Lukas Enembe Sports Complex in Nolokla, Jayapura Regency, Papua, Indonesia. Located between the Cyclops Mountains and Lake Sentani, the stadium takes up 71,697 square meters of land and can accommodate more than 40,263 spectators. Named after former governor of Papua Lukas Enembe, it was built as the main venue for the 2021 National Sports Week.

Construction began in late of 2016 and completed in May 2019. The structure of the stadium came from the special autonomy fund and the national budget for the Papua provincial budget, which in total spent around IDR 1.3 trillion.
