= Tanribali Lamo =

Indonesian military officer and bureaucrat

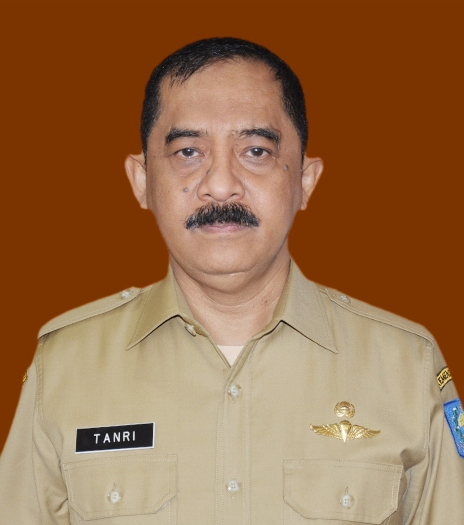

Governor of North Maluku Acting
- In office 23 October 2013 – 2 May 2014
- President: Susilo Bambang Yudhoyono
- Preceded by: Thaib Armaiyn
- Succeeded by: Abdul Ghani Kasuba

Governor of West Papua Acting
- In office 25 July 2011 – 16 January 2012
- President: Susilo Bambang Yudhoyono
- Preceded by: Abraham Octavianus Atururi
- Succeeded by: Abraham Octavianus Atururi

Governor of Central Sulawesi Acting
- In office 31 March 2011 – 17 June 2011
- President: Susilo Bambang Yudhoyono
- Preceded by: Bandjela Paliudju
- Succeeded by: Longki Djanggola

Governor of South Sulawesi Acting
- In office 19 January 2008 – 8 April 2008
- President: Susilo Bambang Yudhoyono
- Preceded by: Amin Syam
- Succeeded by: Syahrul Yasin Limpo

Director General of National Unity and Politics
- In office 31 December 2008 – 1 January 2015
- President: Susilo Bambang Yudhoyono; Joko Widodo
- Preceded by: Sudarsono Hardjosoekarto
- Succeeded by: Indro Baskoro (acting); Soedarmo (as Director General of Politics and General Government)

Personal details
- Born: November 15, 1952 (age 73) Bone, South Sulawesi, Indonesia

Military service
- Allegiance: Indonesia
- Branch/service: Army
- Years of service: 1974—2008
- Rank: Major General

Achmad Tanribali Salim Lamo (born 15 November 1952) is an Indonesian military officer and bureaucrat who became the Director General of National Unity and Politics in the Ministry of Home Affairs. Tanribali also held several acting governorships during his tenure in the ministry.

== Early life ==
Tanribali was born on 15 November 1952 in Bone Regency. His father, Achmad Lamo, was the Governor of South Sulawesi for two periods and former Deputy Speaker of the People's Consultative Assembly. He started his education at the People's School (equivalent to elementary school) in 1958 and finished in 1964. He then attended junior high school and high school in Makassar, where he finished in 1970.

Tanribali entered the National Armed Forces Academy in 1970, four years after his father became governor. He graduated from the academy with the rank of second lieutenant on 16 December 1974.

== Military career ==
Tanribali started his military career as a platoon commander in the Siliwangi (West Java) Military Regional Command. He was rotated a year later to serve at the Hasanuddin (South Sulawesi) Military Regional Command—his father's province—and held various positions in the military region's personnel section. After six years in the province, he was sent as a teacher and taught at the Adjutant General Education Center. Tanribali was transferred again in 1991 to the Jaya (Jakarta) Military Region Command, where he became the deputy adjutant general and later adjutant general to the military region's commander. Tanribali ended his tenure at the military region in 1995 and became the Superintendent of the Adjutant General Education Center. During his tenure as superintendent, Lamo gave a titular rank of lieutenant colonel to Idris Sardi who taught music in the Adjutant General Education Center.

Tanribali was appointed an assistant senior officer in the army personnel staff in 1995 before being appointed the director of the army intendance two years later. He was promoted to the rank of brigadier general and held the position for two years. Tanribali then became the Deputy Assistant for Personal Affairs to the Army Chief of Staff in 2001. He was promoted to major general in 2003 and became the Assistant for Personnel Affairs to the Army Chief of Staff. After his resignation as personnel assistant, Tanribali was replaced by Aryono Murtamadinata. (Note: The article Current Data on the Indonesian Military Elite, September 2005–March 2008 stated that Tanribali was already replaced from his post of assistant for personnel affairs on 9 January. However, according to an interview with the army spokesperson Ricardo Siagian at Kadispenad: "Mestinya Tanribali Sudah Pensiun", Tanribali still held the post as of 17 January.)

== Bureaucratic career ==
=== Acting Governor of South Sulawesi ===
==== Background ====
The 2007 South Sulawesi gubernatorial election, which was held on 5 November 2007, saw the incumbent governor Amin Syam and vice governor Syahrul Yasin Limpo running on a separate ticket for the governor office. Limpo won the elections, but Syam disputed the results of the elections. As Syam's term came closer to end, speculations arise as to who would become the acting governor.

The popular names that became the candidate for the office were the Director General of Regional Autonomy Sodjuangon Situmorang and former commander of the Brawijaya Military Regional Command Syamsul Mapparepa. In an unexpected move, Minister of Home Affairs Mardiyanto appointed Tanribali instead. As the governor's office could not be held by an on duty military officer, Tanribali was sworn in first as expert staff to the minister on 19 January 2008. His swearing in as an expert staff marked his "transfer of status" from a military officer to a civilian. Several hours later, on 12 o'clock, Tanribali was sworn in as the Acting Governor of South Sulawesi.

==== Controversy ====
Tanribali's sudden assumption of governorship sparked controversy as pro-democracy activists fear that his appointment signals the return of the armed forces into the politics. Wisnu Dewabrata of Kompas reported that there were no such thing as a "transfer of status", as the only way a military officer could become a civilian is through retirement or resignation, thus violating the current law on the armed forces. Indonesian Institute of Science political researcher, Ikrar Nusabhakti, stated that Tanribali's appointment signifies the setback on the armed forces reformation and a gross violation of the law. Member of the People's Representative Council Yuddy Chrisnandi regrets that the Commander-in-Chief of the Armed Forces did not reject the appointment of Tanribali. Governor of the National Resilience Institute Muladi stated that there is nothing to worry about Tanribali's appointment and that it is more important to pacify South Sulawesi following the conflict between the two candidates.

There were conflicting informations as to whether Tanribali had actually retired from the military. The armed forces spokesperson Sagoem Tamboen stated that Tanribali had not retired from the military, while the army spokesperson Ricardo Siagian stated that Tanribali was no longer a member of the armed forces.

Mardiyanto himself stated that he appointed Tanribali due to the lack of any ministry officials that could held the office and that Tanribali was a well-known and neutral figure in South Sulawesi who he believed could pacify the province.

==== Reconciliation ====
Immediately after his inauguration as the acting governor, Tanribali held a coordinating meeting with bureau heads of South Sulawesi, which resulted in the decision to resolve the electoral conflict as soon as possible. Tanribali arranged a meeting between the two candidates, to which both agreed. Tanribali also visited other influential figures, such as former governor Andi Oddang and local leaders of political parties. Tempo remarked that Tanribali's pacification strategy was a success, as Makassar, the capital of South Sulawesi, became gradually clear from clashes due to the conflicts. The Supreme Court eventually decided that Limpo won the elections. Tanribali handed over his governorship on 8 April 2008.

Tanribali's role in reconciliation was compared to his father, who was appointed a middle option between the government-backed and the local military-backed candidate.

=== Director General of National Unity and Politics ===
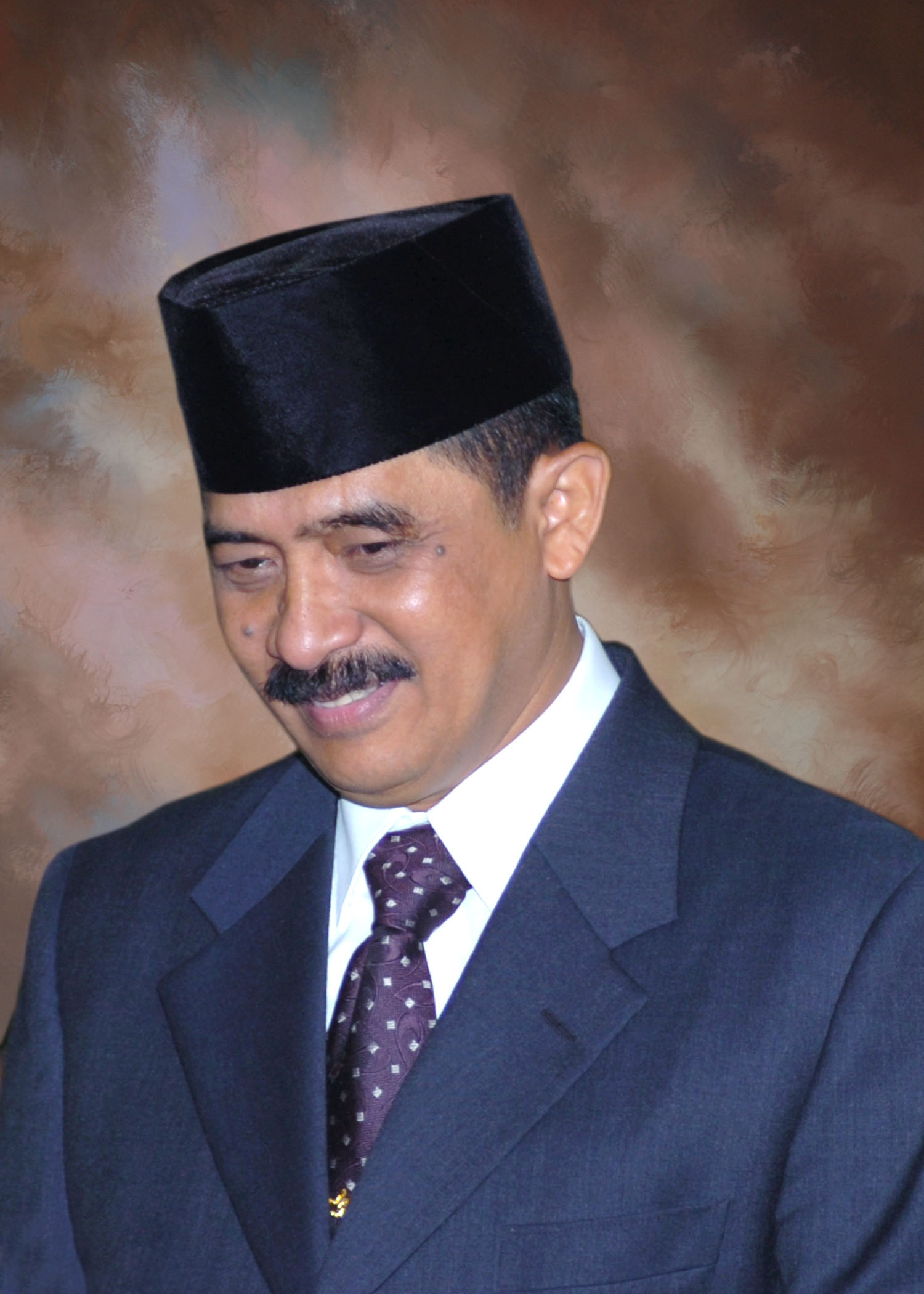
Tanribali Lamo as the Director General of National Unity and Politics.

After several months becoming an expert staff to the Minister of Home Affairs, Tanribali assumed office as the Director General of National Unity and Politics on 31 December 2008. He was inaugurated for the same office second time on 17 September 2010.

In July 2013, Tanribali announced that his directorate general are preparing seven government regulations for organizations. He stated that these regulations were made to sanction organizations that led to social unrest. He also announced the previous month that the directorate general has recorded a total of 298 internal conflicts in Indonesia from 2010 until 2012.

In May 2014, Minister of Internal Affairs Gamawan Fauzi instructed Tanribali's directorate general to prepare the bill for electoral law in preparation of the General Elections Commission.

Tanribali announced in October 2014 that his directorate general have been monitoring the acts of the Islamic Defenders Front for the past few years and has received countless reports about the organizations. He stated that prior to that month, the directorate general only gave sanctions to the organization. After the 2014 riots caused by the organization, Tanribali affirmed that the directorate general would coordinate with the Greater Jakarta Metropolitan Regional Police to resolve the problem and opened up a possibility to dissolve the organization.

=== Acting Governor of Central Sulawesi, West Papua, and North Maluku ===
After three years serving as directorate general, Tanribali became the acting governor of Central Sulawesi on 31 March 2011, replacing the incumbent Bandjela Paliudju who ran as a candidate for vice governor in the 2011 Central Sulawesi gubernatorial elections. After ending his term as acting governor on 17 June, Tanribali was inaugurated for the same office in West Papua on 25 July, replacing Abraham Octavianus Atururi.

Unlike his previous experience in Central Sulawesi, Tanribali had to face various problems regarding elections and bureaucracy in the province. Tanribali was faced with the reality that only 29 percent of the funds allocated for West Papua's budget were used. He also have to reschedule the elections from 3 November to 9 November in order to clear out misperceptions. The winner of the election, Abraham Octavianus Atururi, received his office from Tanribali on 16 January 2012.

A year later, Tanribali became an acting governor again, this time in North Maluku, on 23 October 2013. Tanribali only had to handle the second round of the gubernatorial election in North Maluku, unlike in the previous province where he had to completely start over the elections again. He eventually ended his tenure as acting governor on 2 May 2014.

Due to the sheer amount of acting governorships that he held, Tanribali was known as a "governor specializing in conflict regions".

=== Retirement ===
Tanribali retired from the Ministry of Home Affairs on 1 January 2015 and was replaced by Indro Baskoro as acting director general. At the end of the month, the directorate general was dissolved and merged into the Directorate General of Politics and General Government.

== Personal life ==
Tanribali is married to Rasthina Dewi. The couple has two sons (Adi Adriantito and Dade Aryanto) and a daughter (Nani Wulandari).

== Awards ==
- Military Long Service Medals, 4th Category (Indonesian: Satyalancana Kesetiaan 8 Tahun) (1981)
- Military Long Service Medals, 3rd Category (Indonesian: Satyalancana Kesetiaan 16 Tahun) (1987)
- Military Long Service Medals, 2nd Category (Indonesian: Satyalancana Kesetiaan 24 Tahun) (1998)
- Military Instructor Service Medals (Indonesian: Satyalancana Dwidya Sistha) (1999)
- Star of Kartika Eka Paksi, 3rd Class (Indonesian: Bintang Kartika Eka Paksi Nararya) (2000)
- Star of Kartika Eka Paksi, 2nd Class (Indonesian: Bintang Kartika Eka Paksi Pratama) (2001)
- Star of Yudha Dharma, 3rd Class (Indonesian: Bintang Yudha Dharma Nararya) (2006)
- Star of Yudha Dharma, 2nd Class (Indonesian: Bintang Yudha Dharma Pratama) (14 August 2006)
- Social Welfare Medal (Indonesian: Satyalancana Kebhaktian Sosial) (2008)
- Role Model Medal (Indonesian: Satyalancana Wirakarya) (2009)
- Star of Service, 1st Class (Indonesian: Bintang Jasa Utama) (13 August 2013)
- Star of Mahaputera, 5th Class (Indonesian: Bintang Mahaputera Nararya) (13 October 2014)
