= Abraham Octavianus Atururi =

Indonesian politician (1951–2019)

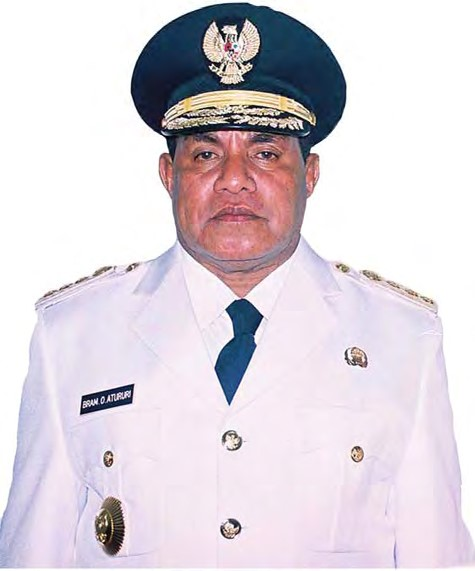

Governor of West Papua
- In office 17 January 2012 – 17 January 2017
- President: Susilo Bambang Yudhoyono; Joko Widodo
- Deputy: Rahimin Katjong; Irene Manibuy
- Preceded by: Tanribali Lamo (acting)
- Succeeded by: Nathaniel Mandacan (acting); Eko Subowo (acting); Dominggus Mandacan
- In office 24 July 2006 – 24 July 2011
- President: Susilo Bambang Yudhoyono
- Deputy: Rahimin Katjong
- Preceded by: Timbul Pudjianto (acting)
- Succeeded by: Tanribali Lamo (acting)
- In office 14 November 2003 – 23 July 2005
- President: B. J. Habibie; Abdurrahman Wahid; Megawati Soekarnoputri; Susilo Bambang Yudhoyono
- Preceded by: office established
- Succeeded by: Timbul Pudjianto (acting)
- In office 12 October 1999 – 16 October 1999
- Preceded by: office established
- Succeeded by: office dissolved

Vice Governor of Irian Jaya
- In office 7 October 1995 – 15 April 2000 Serving with Basyir Bachtiar, John Djopari, and Herman Monim
- Preceded by: Soedardjat Nataatmadja
- Succeeded by: Constant Karma

Regent of Sorong
- In office 1992 – 7 October 1995
- Preceded by: Joko Purnomo Adi
- Succeeded by: John Piet Wanane

Personal details
- Born: 13 October 1951 Serui, Netherlands New Guinea
- Died: 20 September 2019 (aged 67) Azhar Zahir Naval Hospital, Manokwari, West Papua, Indonesia
- Spouse: Julieta D. Ximenes
- Children: 5
- Parents: Lambert Atururi (father); Elizabeth Numberi (mother)

Military service
- Branch/service: Indonesian Navy
- Years of service: 1973–1999
- Rank: Brigadier general
- Unit: Indonesian Marine Corps

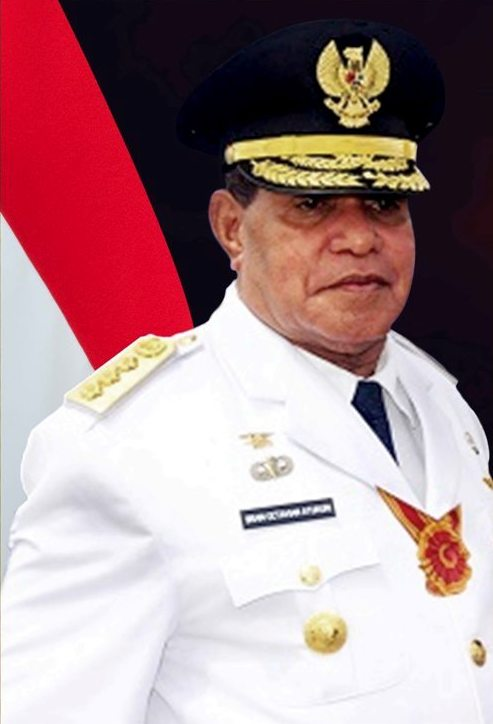
Abraham Octavianus Atururi

Abraham Octavianus Atururi (13 October 1951 – 20 September 2019) was an Indonesian politician. He was born in the province of Papua, and served as governor of the West Papua province from 2006 to 2017.

== Dates of rank ==
Second lieutenant	11 December 1974
Colonel	1 October 1992
Brigadier general	6 October 1997

== Awards ==
- Military Long Service Medals, 4th Category
- Military Long Service Medals, 3rd Category
- Military Long Service Medals, 2nd Category
- Timor Military Campaign Medal
- Navy Meritorious Service Star, 3rd Class
- Star of Mahaputera, 2nd Class (13 August 2014)
