= Soedarmo =

Indonesian general and diplomat

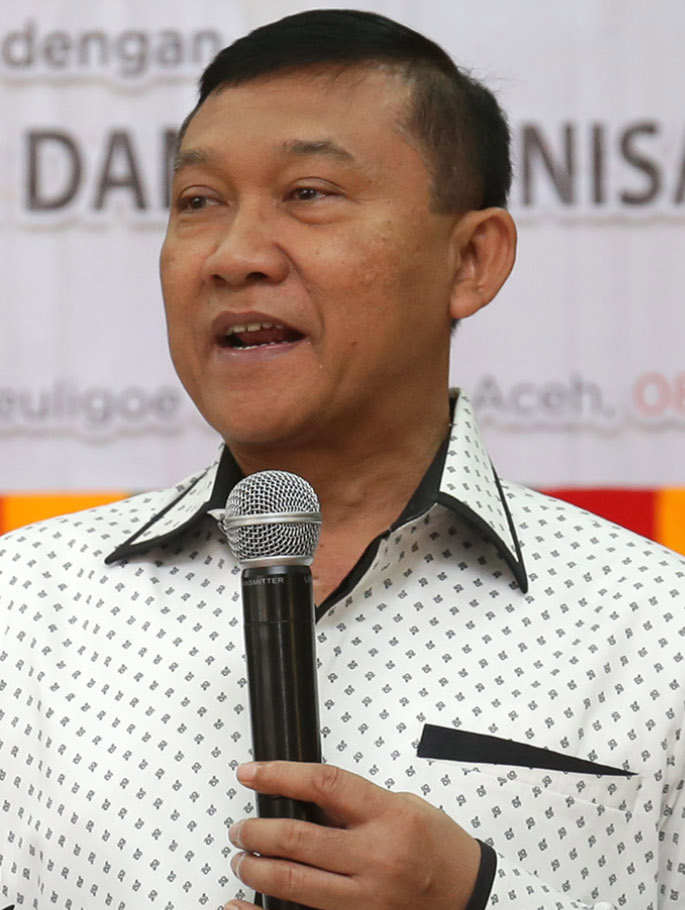

Governor of Papua (acting)
- In office 26 February 2018 – 5 September 2018
- Preceded by: Lukas Enembe
- Succeeded by: Lukas Enembe

Governor of Aceh (acting)
- In office 27 October 2016 – 25 June 2017
- Preceded by: Zaini Abdullah

Director General of Politics and General Government
- In office 1 July 2015 – 1 October 2019
- President: Joko Widodo
- Preceded by: Agung Mulyana (as Director General of General Government; Tanribali Lamo (as Director General of National Unity and Politics); Indro Baskoro (acting)
- Succeeded by: Bahtiar

Personal details
- Born: September 28, 1956 (age 69) Tulungagung, East Java, Indonesia
- Spouse: Ida Yuliati

Military service
- Allegiance: Indonesia
- Branch: Indonesian Army
- Service years: 1983–2015
- Rank: Major General

Soedarmo (born 28 September 1959) is an Indonesian military officer and bureaucrat who was the Director General of Politics and General Government from 2015 to 2019. Due to his office in the Ministry of Home Affairs, he held acting governorships in Aceh and Papua.

== Military career ==
Soedarmo began his military career after graduating from the Armed Forces Academy in 1983. He spend most of his military career at Army Intelligence Center and was deployed to East Timor and Irian Jaya for intelligence and defence operations. He also served as the commander of Makassar's military district in the 1990s.

In 1995, Soedarmo received his first overseas deployment, serving as Indonesia's military attaché to Singapore until 1998, as a staff for legal and security Affairs at the Indonesian Embassy in Malaysia from 1998 until 2003, and as Indonesia's military attaché to Singapore from 2003 until 2006. He returned to Indonesia and became an assistant officer for foreign affairs at the Army Security, Monitoring and Evaluation staff. He was promoted from colonel to brigadier general in 2009.

Afterwards, Soedarmo entered Indonesian State Intelligence Agency. He was initially assigned as the director for Sumatra and Kalimantan at one of the agency's deputies. He was moved to a new post on 6 March 2012 and became the agency's head in East Kalimantan. Three years later, on 15 September 2014, Soedarmo became an expert staff for ideological and political affairs in the agency, and promoted again to major general. Soedarmo was dismissed from his office on 1 April 2015, and he became a military officer without any office since then.

== Bureaucratic career ==
=== Director General of Politics and General Government ===
Soedarmo became the Director General of Politics and General Government in the Ministry of Internal Affairs on 1 July 2015, replacing Agung Mulyana. As the first director general of politics and general government, Soedarmo reorganized the National Unity and Political Body (previously a separate directorate general) and made it under the structure of the directorate general. He also took steps to improve and repair the directorate general's website to prevent out-of-date news.

Following several religious disputes in Aceh in 2015, Soedarmo remarked that he would evaluate laws regarding the construction of religious buildings.

In December 2015, Soedarmo announced that his directorate general has finished constructing a community radio station in East Kalimantan's cross-border region with Malaysia. He stated that the construction of the radio station was to curb the influence of Malaysia into the province.

Soedarmo announced in January 2016 that his directorate general would keep a close eyes on new and unregistered mass organizations in Indonesia that posed a threat to the national ideology Pancasila and the government. The Human rights watchdog Setara Institute criticized its decision, stating that it would be better for the directorate general to watch existing hardline organizations such as the Islamic Defenders Front rather than on new groups.

=== Acting Governor of Aceh ===
Arrival of Soedarmo in Aceh

Soedarmo's first briefing as acting governor

Soedarmo became governor of Aceh on 27 October 2016, replacing Governor Zaini Abdullah and Vice Governor Muzakkir Manaf, who had to resign due to seeking reelection. Tjahjo Kumolo, the minister of internal affairs at that time, stated that Soedarmo's appointment as acting governor was intended to increase the province's cooperation with the Indonesian State Intelligence Agency.

In the midst of his tenure as governor, a 6.5 magnitude earthquake struck Aceh in December 2016. Soedarmo immediately declared the earthquake as an emergency. He instructed emergency bodies to work in the hardest hit areas and stated that deploying heavy equipment and distribution of aid supplies were the first priorities.

In the beginning of January 2017, a group of students launched a demonstration in protest of Soedarmo's plan to enact the province's budget during his tenure. The students demanded that the elected governor should be the one who enacted the budget.

Soedarmo ended his tenure as acting governor on 25 June 2017 and appointed Aceh's regional secretary, Dermawan, as the next acting governor.

=== Acting Governor of Papua ===
Soedarmo became the acting Governor of Papua on 26 February 2018, replacing Lukas Enembe who was running for the 2018 Papua gubernatorial election. His term was extended on 10 April 2018 after the elected governor could not be elected in schedule.

During his term as governor, Soedarmo instructed the closure of several illegal companies. He also instructed the illegal Korowai gold mine in August 2018, which has caused disturbance amongst the local residents and environmental pollution since it began operating in December 2017. Papua Councillor John Jose Gobay urged the provincial government to handover the management of the gold mine to the local population.

At the World Environment Day ceremony, which was held on 5 June 2018, Soedarmo pledged an end to plastic waste in Papua.

Soedarmo ended his term after Lukas Enembe, who won the gubernatorial election, was sworn in as definitive governor on 5 September 2018.

=== Retirement ===
Soedarmo retired from the Ministry of Internal Affairs on 1 October 2019. A ceremony marking his retirement was held the day before.

== Gubernatorial candidate for East Kalimantan ==
In November 2017, Soedarmo was named as a possible candidate to contest in the 2018 East Kalimantan gubernatorial election and allegedly received endorsement from the Golkar party. However, he did not run in the elections.

== National Sports Committee of Indonesia ==
On 3 February 2020, Soedarmo became the Deputy Chairman of the National Sports Committee of Indonesia, replacing Nanang Djuana. Marciano Norman, the chairman of the National Sports Committee of Indonesia, stated that Soedarmo's experience as acting governor in Papua would help the committee to organize the 2021 National Sports Week, which was to be held in Papua.

== Personal life ==
Soedarmo is married to Ida Yuliati. The couple has two sons and two daughters.
