= Constant Karma =

Indonesian politician (born 1954)

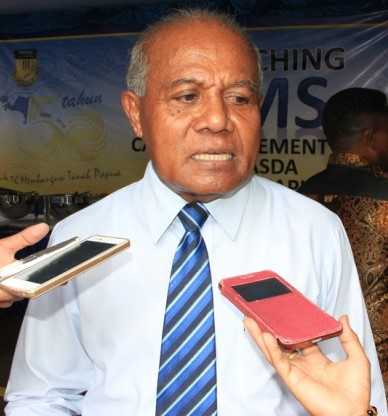

Governor of Papua (acting)
- In office 5 November 2012 – 9 April 2013
- President: Susilo Bambang Yudhoyono
- Preceded by: Syamsul Arif Rivai
- Succeeded by: Lukas Enembe

8th Vice Governor of Papua
- In office 23 November 2000 – 23 November 2005
- President: Abdurrahman Wahid; Megawati Soekarnoputri; Susilo Bambang Yudhoyono
- Preceded by: Abraham Octavianus Atururi
- Succeeded by: Alex Hesegem

Personal details
- Born: March 24, 1954 (age 72) Biak, Dutch New Guinea
- Relations: Filep Karma (cousin)
- Education: Gadjah Mada University
- Occupation: Politician, bureaucrat

drh. Constant Karma (born 24 March 1954) is an Indonesian politician and bureaucrat from Papua. He held the position of acting governor of Papua during the transitional period of 2012–2013 and was also deputy governor of Papua from 2000 to 2005.

== Life ==
Born in Biak on 24 March 1954, Karma completed his higher education at the Faculty of Veterinary Medicine of Gadjah Mada University in 1981. He pursued a civil servant career in 1982 and held various positions as department head. Notably, he served as the head of the Agriculture Service in Jayawijaya Regency and later took on the role of the head of the Agriculture Service in Jayawijaya Regency and later took on the role of the head of the Animal Husbandry Service in Jayawijaya Regency, Jayapura Regency, and Papua (province).

== Work ==
- HIV & AIDS di Papua: penanggulangan dan harapan (2014)
