= Klemen Tinal =

Indonesian politician (1970–2021)

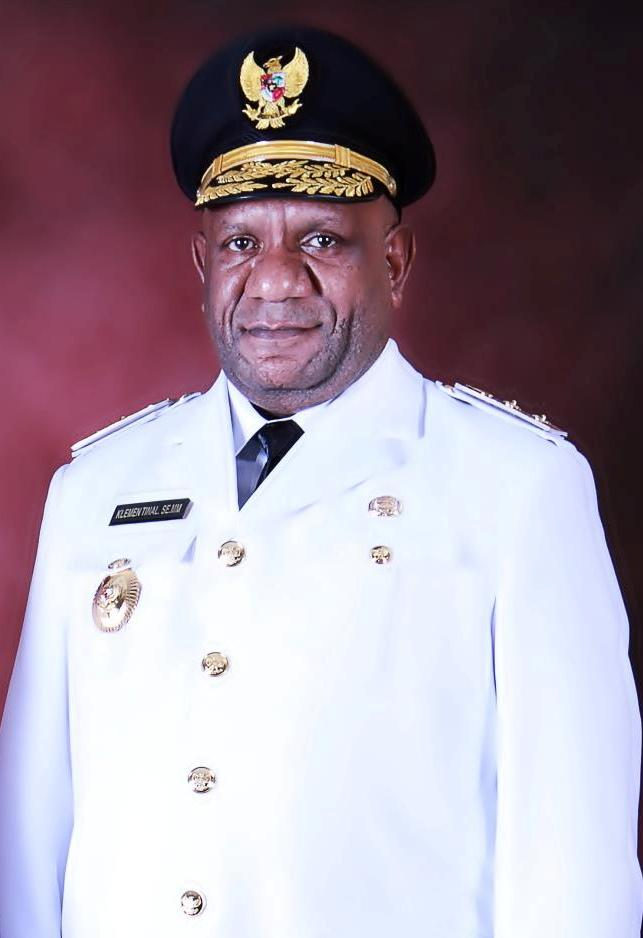

Vice Governor of Papua
- In office 9 April 2013 (Note: From 26 February 2018 to 5 September 2018 resigned in order to run for reelection) – 21 May 2021
- President: Susilo Bambang Yudhoyono; Joko Widodo
- Governor: Barnabas Suebu; Lukas Enembe
- Preceded by: Alex Hesegem

Regent of Mimika
- In office 4 December 2008 – 9 April 2013
- Governor: Barnabas Suebu
- Deputy: Abdul Muis
- Preceded by: Athanasius Allo Rafra (acting)
- Succeeded by: Eltinus Omaleng
- In office 14 December 2001 – 14 December 2006
- Governor: Jacobus Perviddya Solossa
- Deputy: Methodius Mamapuku
- Preceded by: Titus Octovianus Potereyauw
- Succeeded by: Methodius Mamapuku

Personal details
- Born: 23 August 1970 Puncak, West Irian, Indonesia
- Died: 21 May 2021 (aged 50) Jakarta, Indonesia
- Party: Golkar
- Spouse: Stefa Sodora Dupuy
- Children: Lidia Natalia Tinal; William Tinal; Daud Salomon Tinal
- Education: Surapati University; Cenderawasih University

Klemen Tinal (23 August 1970 – 21 May 2021) was an Indonesian politician from the Golkar party. He held the office of the Regent of Mimika from 2001 until 2006 and again from 2008 until 2013. He won the 2013 election for Vice Governor of Papua and was installed in office on 9 April 2013. Tinal won re-election in 2018; his second term as Vice Governor ended abruptly due to his death on 21 May 2021.

The Klemen Tinal Roller Sports Stadium in Jayapura Regency, used as venue for Indonesia's 2020 National Sports Week indoor roller skating tournament is named after him.

== Early life ==
Tinal was born on 23 August 1970 in Beoga, Puncak, as the son of Abdiel M. Tinal and Elisabet Kibak. He began his education at the elementary and junior high school owned by the Jayawijaya Education Foundation in Tembagapura. After graduating from junior high school in 1985, Tinal moved to Bandung, where he attended the 1st Bandung High School. Tinal was elected as the chairman of the student body in his second year in the school and received the award as the best performing student body chairman in the same year. He graduated from the school in 1988.

== Career ==
Tinal returned to Papua after his graduation from high school. He started his career as an administrative supervisor at the Freeport Indonesia company in 1993. He resigned in 2001 to run for the Regent of Mimika. From 1997 to 2001, he was the Papua regional leader of Pemuda Pancasila.

== Political career ==
=== Regent of Mimika ===
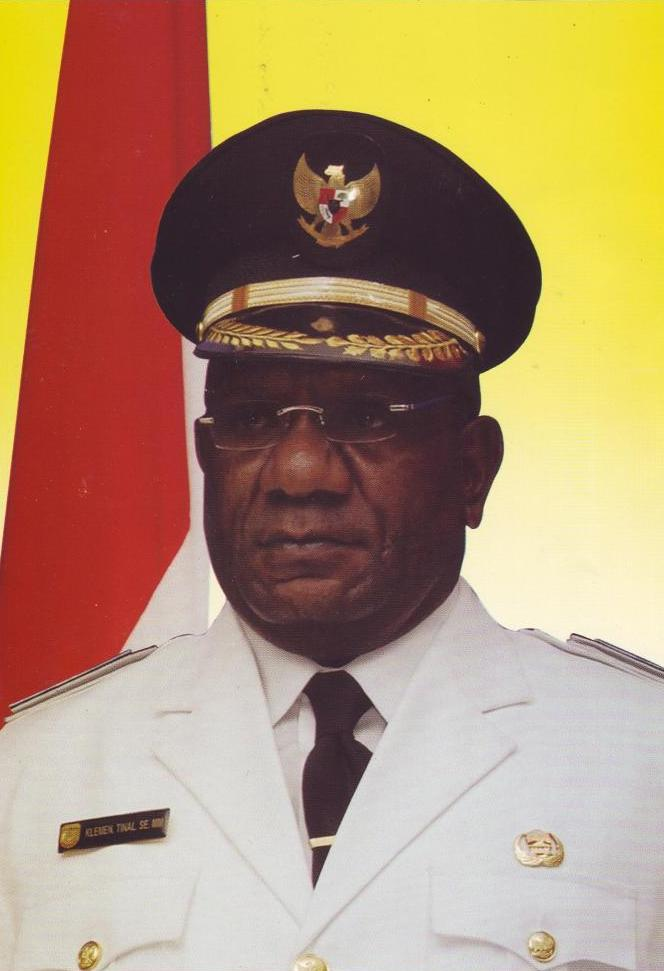
Klemen Tinal as the Regent of Mimika

Tinal won the elections for the Regent of Mimika office in the midst of 2001 and was installed in the office on 14 December 2001. At the time of his installation, Tinal was one of the youngest regents in Indonesia, assuming the office at an age slightly above the legal threshold of thirty years old. Tinal and his deputy, Methodius Mamapuku, were criticized by political researcher Ans Gregory da Iry for their lack of experience in bureaucracy. However, da Iry stated that both had sufficient experience in running social and non-governmental organizations.

Tinal's early years were marred by clashes between supporters and opponents of the Central Papua Province, a new province that was proposed to be formed by splitting the province of Papua into two. Although a peace treaty between the two factions was signed in November 2003, there were threats to kidnap members of the Mimika parliament by both sides.

During the 2004 Indonesian legislative election, disputes between the government and political party led to the vacancy of seven seats of parliament and the de facto dormancy of the parliament. Although the parliament speaker Vientje Tebay had been dismissed from his office on 26 November 2006 due to term expiration, Tebay and Tinal colluded to appoint their own members of parliament. The seven members were inaugurated on 12 November, sparking protests from political parties and provincial government. The dormancy went on for months and still had not been resolved, even after Tinal's term as regent expired on 14 December 2006. The seven seats were finally filled on 29 December 2006 as a result of an agreement mediated by Governor of Papua Barnabas Suebu.

Tinal ran again as a candidate for the Regent of Mimika in the 2008 local elections. During the electoral debates, Tinal shocked electoral observers due to his unrealistic goals, such as building trams similar to those in the Netherlands. Despite the unrealistic goals, Tinal was declared as the winner of the elections, with a margin of less than two thousand votes over the runner-up. The ballot counting process itself was marked with allegations of electoral fraud, as the number of votes exceeded the number of registered voters.

Several months before his inauguration for the second term, a corruption case that involved Tinal and his wife during his first term was revealed through a financial audit report by the Audit Board of Indonesia. His wife became a fugitive after she was declared as a suspect in the case. Despite continuous calls by various parties to investigate the case before installing Tinal, the governor installed Tinal on 4 December 2008. His second term ended prematurely on 9 April 2013 due to his nomination as the vice governor of Papua.

=== Vice Governor of Papua ===
Tinal was chosen as the running mate of Lukas Enembe, the regent of Puncak Jaya, for the 2013 Papuan gubernatorial elections. The pair was declared eligible to run by the General Elections Commission and managed to win the elections after obtaining 52% of the total votes. Enembe and Tinal were inaugurated for the office on 9 April 2013.

Tinal and Enembe ran again as a pair and sought re-election after their term ended on 9 April 2018. The pair won re-election with more than two-thirds of the total votes. Tinal was installed for his second term on 5 September 2018.

Tinal was elevated to the position of temporary governor of Papua (Note: Although Radio New Zealand mentioned him explicitly as the acting Governor of Papua, the spokesperson to the Governor of Papua only mentioned that "the wheels of government will be run by the Vice Governor of Papua, Klemen Tinal". (roda pemerintahan akan dijalankan oleh Wakil Gubernur Papua, Klemen Tinal)) after Governor Enembe departed to Singapore for medical treatment on 9 May 2021. Tinal, however, went on sick leave at that point.

== Songwriting ==
During his tenure as the Regent of Mimika, Tinal and Moluccan singer Melky Goeslaw composed a song titled "Eme Neme Yauware" ("In Brotherhood and Unity We Build"). The song became a popular song in Mimika and was sung on various occasions by the populace.

== Death ==
Tinal died two weeks after he left his post on sick leave. He died in the Abdi Waluyo Hospital, Jakarta, on 21 May 2021 at approximately 04.00 UTC+7. He died due to heart complications. His body was laid out at the Gatot Subroto funeral home several hours after his death. Various former and current cabinet members, such as Zainuddin Amali, Aburizal Bakrie, Airlangga Hartarto, Agus Gumiwang Kartasasmita, Tito Karnavian, Akbar Tanjung, and Muhadjir Effendy, paid their final respects to Tinal.

Tinal's body was flown by a chartered flight from Jakarta to the capital of Papua, Jayapura, a day after his death. After his body arrived at Jayapura's Dortheys Hiyo Eluay International Airport on the morning of 22 May, a military ceremony led by the Commander of the Kodam XVII/Cenderawasih Major-General Ignatius Yogo Triyono was held at the airport's field. Afterwards, his body was transported to lie in state at the Papua State House. When several officials from the Papuan government visited the state house, several relatives of Tinal attacked the officials.

The group also reportedly stoned the State House. The Spokesperson for the Governor of Papua stated that the stoning was not an act of violence but was part of a tradition by Tinal's tribe. Papua police chief Inspector General Matius Fakhiri, who was one of the officials who visited the state house, likewise stated that the stoning was part of a tribal dance called the Waeta dance.

After a day lying in state in Jayapura, Tinal's body was transported to Mimika and arrived at Timika's Mozes Kilangin Airport on the afternoon of 23 May. A military ceremony was held at the airport's hangar before the body lay in state at the Timika State House. While the body was being transported from the airport to the State House, thousands of grieving Mimika citizens flocked the Timika State House to conduct a funeral prayer for Tinal. After the body arrived and was placed at the state house, the crowd attempted to enter the State House to pay their last respects for Tinal, but were blocked by soldiers who were guarding the State House.

Tinal's body was transported again to the Jemaat Betlehem GKII Church on the next day where a requiem was held for him. After the requiem commenced, his body was brought to his family's cemetery complex to be buried beside his parents grave in Timika. The funeral ceremony began at 14.00 local time and was led by the incumbent Regent of Mimika Eltinus Omaleng.

In response to his death, the flag of Indonesia at the governor's office of Papua was flown half-mast for seven days. Tinal's family received compensation amounting to one billion rupiahs from the government of Papua and one hundred million rupiahs from the Regent of Central Mamberamo. Simon, one of Tinal's relatives, stated that the compensation was shared immediately with funeral attendees.

== Family ==
Klemen Tinal was married to Stefra Sodora Dupuy. The couple had three children, Lidya Natalia Tinal, William Tinal, and Daud Solomon Tinal.
