= Freddy Numberi =

Indonesian politician

Vice Admiral (Ret.) Freddy Numberi
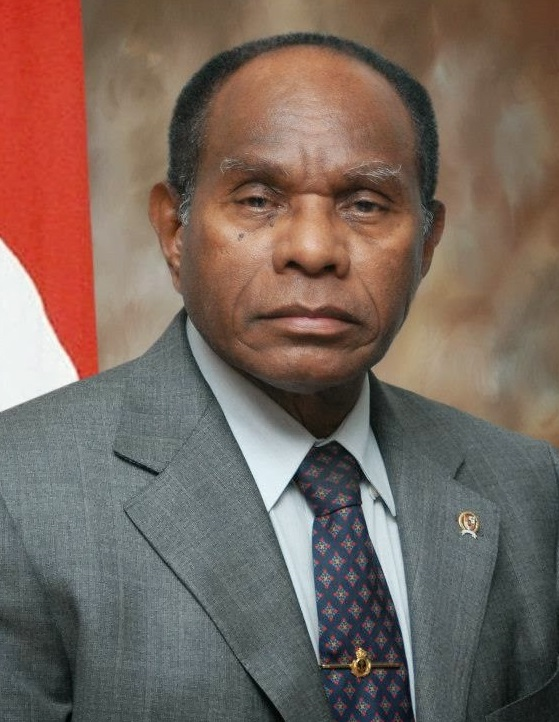
- Portrait as Minister of Marine Affairs and Fisheries

35th Minister of Transportation of Indonesia
- In office 22 October 2009 – 19 October 2011
- President: Susilo Bambang Yudhoyono
- Preceded by: Jusman Syafii Djamal
- Succeeded by: E.E. Mangindaan

4th Minister of Maritime Affairs and Fisheries of Indonesia
- In office 21 October 2004 – 20 October 2009
- President: Susilo Bambang Yudhoyono
- Preceded by: Rokhmin Dahuri
- Succeeded by: Fadel Muhammad

9th Minister for Administrative and Bureaucratic Reforms
- In office 29 October 1999 – 29 August 2000
- President: Abdurrahman Wahid
- Preceded by: Hartarto Sastrosunarto
- Succeeded by: Ryaas Rasyid

11th Governor of Irian Jaya
- In office April 1998 – 15 April 2000
- President: Suharto; B.J. Habibie; Abdurrahman Wahid
- Preceded by: Jacob Pattipi
- Succeeded by: J.P. Solossa

Personal details
- Born: 15 October 1947 (age 78) Yapen Waropen, Papua, Indonesia
- Spouse: Anna Antoinette

Military service
- Allegiance: Indonesia
- Branch/service: Indonesian Navy
- Rank: Vice Admiral

Freddy Numberi (born 15 October 1947) is a retired Vice Admiral in the Indonesian Navy and politician from Yapen Waropen, Papua. He was part of the Second United Indonesia Cabinet and served as Minister of Transportation in Indonesia between 22 October 2009 and 19 October 2011. Under Susilo Bambang Yudhoyono, Freddy was chosen as the Ambassador of Indonesia to Italy, Albania and Malta and was then sworn in as Minister of Maritime Affairs and Fisheries (2004–2009). He was Governor of Papua from 1998 to 2000.
