= Soedardjat Nataatmadja =

Indonesian politician (1938–2020)

Major General Soedardjat Nataatmadja
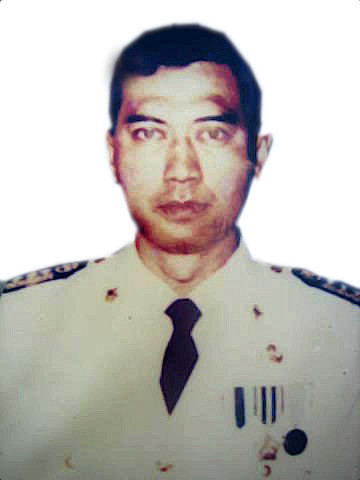

Member of the People's Representative Council
- In office 1 October 1997 – 1 October 1999
- President: Suharto
- Constituency: South Kalimantan

Vice Governor of Irian Jaya
- In office 8 February 1989 – 26 May 1993
- President: Suharto
- Governor: Barnabas Suebu; Jacob Pattipi
- Preceded by: Poedjono Pranyoto
- Succeeded by: Basyir Bachtiar

Regent of Bogor
- In office 4 October 1983 – 4 October 1988
- Governor: Aang Kunaefi Kartawiria; Yogie Suardi Memet
- Preceded by: Ayip Rughby
- Succeeded by: Eddie Yoso Martadipura

Personal details
- Born: 30 June 1938 Bandung, West Java, Dutch East Indies
- Died: 6 December 2020 (aged 82) Gatot Soebroto Army Hospital, Jakarta, Indonesia
- Party: Golkar
- Spouse: Ratuningsih
- Nickname(s): Kang Dardjat, Endjat

Military service
- Allegiance: Indonesia
- Branch/service: Army
- Years of service: 1963–1993
- Rank: Major General
- Unit: Zeni (CZI)

Soedardjat Nataatmadja (PSS: Sudarjat Nataatmaja, 30 June 1938 – 6 December 2020) was an Indonesian politician who served as the Regent of Bogor from 1983 until 1988, the Vice Governor of Irian Jaya from 1989 until 1993, Inspector General of the Ministry of Internal Affairs from 1993 until 1997, and as the member of the People's Representative Council from 1997 until 1999.

Born into the Sundanese nobility, Soedardjat enrolled at the Padjadjaran University in 1958, though he dropped out two years later in favor of the National Military Academy. He began his service in the military in 1963 with the rank of first lieutenant. From 1963 until 1983, he was assigned various military posts, starting from East Kalimantan, Jakarta, and West Java.

In 1983, he was elected as the Regent of Bogor. One of his hallmarks during his term as regent was Operation Government Dignity, which was aimed at countering the growth of illegal constructions and expansions. Although he was elected to a second term, his re-election was not approved by the Minister of Internal Affairs, and he was transferred to Irian Jaya in 1989 and served as a Vice Governor for four years.

Nataatmadja returned to Jakarta in 1993, along with his appointment as the Inspector General of the Ministry of Internal Affairs. As the inspector general, he introduced several reforms concerning regional government inspection and led a team to investigate the Sri Roso Sudarmo scandal. He ended his term in 1997 after he was elected as a member of the People's Representative Council.

== Early life ==
Soedardjat Nataatmadja was born on 30 June 1938 in Bandung, West Java, Dutch East Indies, as the son of Moerjani Nataatmadja and Ratu Soelasmi. His father, Moerjani, was a Sundanese aristocrat who served as the Regent of Lebak, Regent of Bogor, and the Resident of Bogor, while his mother, Ratu Soelasmi was also an aristocrat.

Nataatmadja began his studies at the 8th People's School (equivalent to elementary school) in Cirebon in 1945 and graduated from the elementary school in 1951. He then enrolled at the 2nd Junior High School in Bandung, graduated in 1955, enrolled at the 4th High School Section B in Bandung, and graduated in 1958.

Shortly after he graduated from high school, Nataatmadja enrolled at the Doctoral Faculty of the Padjadjaran University in 1958 but dropped out two years later due to his interest in joining the National Military Academy. He graduated from the Academy in 1963 with the rank of first lieutenant.

== Military career ==
After his graduation, Nataatmadja was deployed to East Kalimantan, at the Mulawarman Regional Military Command, where he became a combat engineer officer in the military command. In 1972, he was transferred back to Jakarta, where he became the head of the bureau in the Indonesian Army Headquarters until 1979.

In 1979, Nataatmadja was appointed as the Commander of the Sukabumi Military District. Two years later, in 1981, he was transferred to Bogor, where he became the Chief of Staff of the Bogor Military Regiment.

Nataatmadja retired from the military several months after his resignation from the vice governor's office.

== Regent of Bogor ==
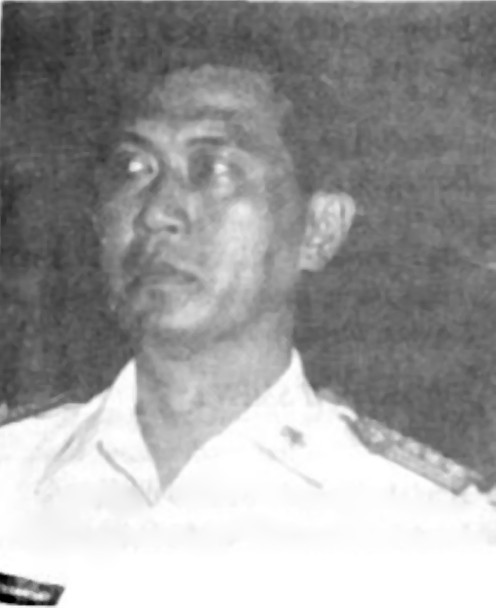
Soedardjat Nataatmadja, Regent of Bogor

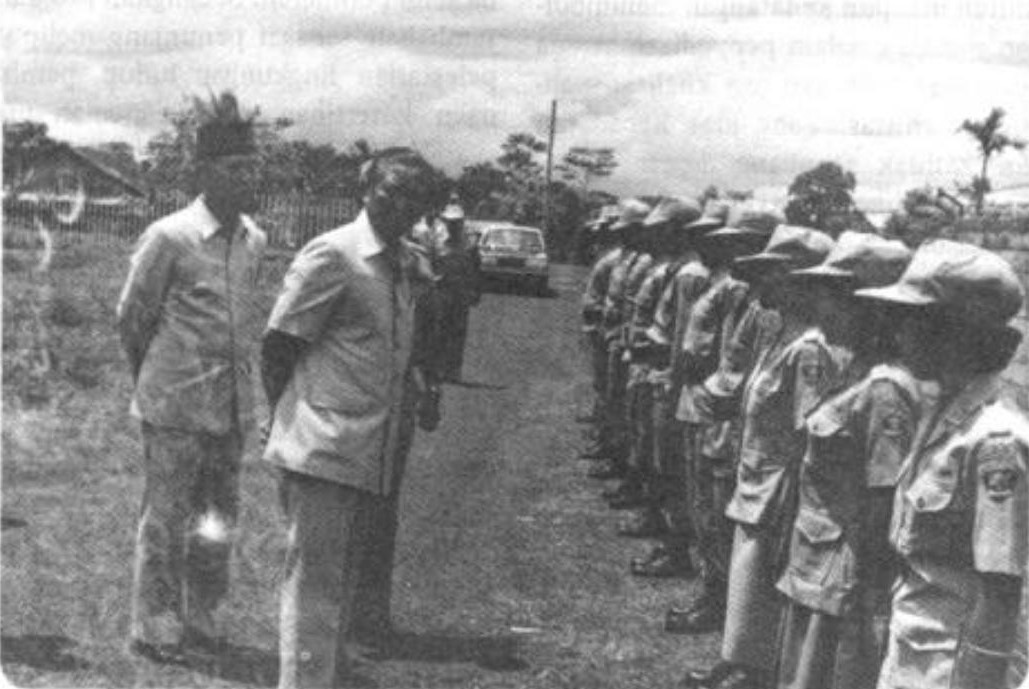
Soedradjat Nataatmadja (far left) accompanying Minister of Internal Affairs Soepardjo Roestam in an inspection of the civil defense force

=== Election and inauguration ===
At the election for the Regent of Bogor, Nataatmadja won with 28 out of 40 votes cast. He was inaugurated as the Regent of Bogor for the 1983–1988 term on 4 October 1983 by Governor of West Java Aang Kunaefi. Following his inauguration, he was promoted from lieutenant colonel to colonel.

=== Operation Government Dignity ===
Since the 1960s, there was an increase in illegal construction and expansion on the Puncak in Bogor. In response to this, the Sukarno administration enacted the Presidential Decree No. 13 of 1963, which handed over the authorization of construction in the area to the Ministry of Public Works. Twenty years later, in 1983, the Suharto administration amended the decree to conform with the situation at that time. Although the amendment still gave the coordinating authority to the Ministry of Public Works, the gubernatorial and regency government were given more autonomy to implement decisions regarding the illegal construction.

In response to the amendment, which gave the regents authority to handle the illegal construction and expansion, Nataatmadja initiated the Operasi Wibawa Praja (Operation Government Dignity). The main goal of the operation was to demolish illegal construction that had no building permits. The demolition team, composed of military forces, police, civilian defense forces and municipal police, were equipped with bulldozers and other demolition tools. The operation was first undertaken in January 1985. The first building that was demolished under this operation was a villa complex, which was built over the ruins of a tea plantation.

The Tempo magazine remarked that the Wibawa Praja Operation was praised for its firmness and was continued by Nataatmadja successors. In an interview, Nataatmadja stated that the operation was part of this effort to implement a "clean and capable government" in Bogor and as a "shock therapy to aware the people to be more careful".

=== Sundanese culture and rejection for reelection ===
Nataatmadja was an avid supporter of Sundanese culture. Nataatmadja endorsed plans to hold a Sundanese language congress, which at that time was dormant, with the previous congress being held almost thirty years before. The plans for the congress were proposed by Uu Rukman and Acil Bimbo, Sundanese humanists. Nataatmadja offered his regency, Bogor, as the venue for the congress. The congress was held on 20 January 1988 in the village of Cipayung.

At the special session of the Bogor Regional People's Representative Council, which was held to elect the regent for the next term, Nataatmadja instructed observers to wear traditional Sundanese clothing. Although he managed to be reelected, his instructions to wear traditional Sundanese clothing infuriated the Minister of Internal Affairs at that time, Rudini, who considered Nataatmadja to be violating the rules. This incident culminated in Rudini refusing to recognize the reelection of Nataatmadja. The council soon picked other candidates and a second election was held. Eddie Yoso Martadipura, an MP from the Armed Forces Faction, won the second election and was inaugurated on 4 October 1988.

After Rudini rejected Nataatmadja for his second term, the government of Bogor offered Nataatmadja a black Toyota Cressida as a gift. However, the offer was soon known by Rudini, and he instructed the Bogor government to cancel the offer.

== Vice Governor of Irian Jaya ==
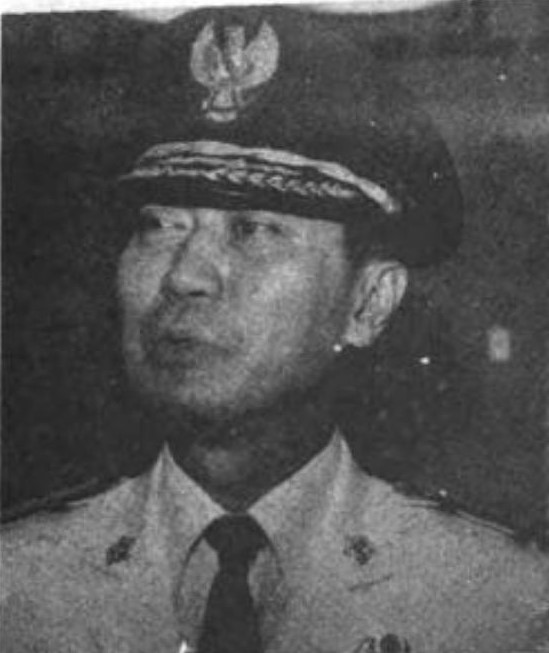
Soedardjat Nataatmadja, shortly after his inauguration as Vice Governor.

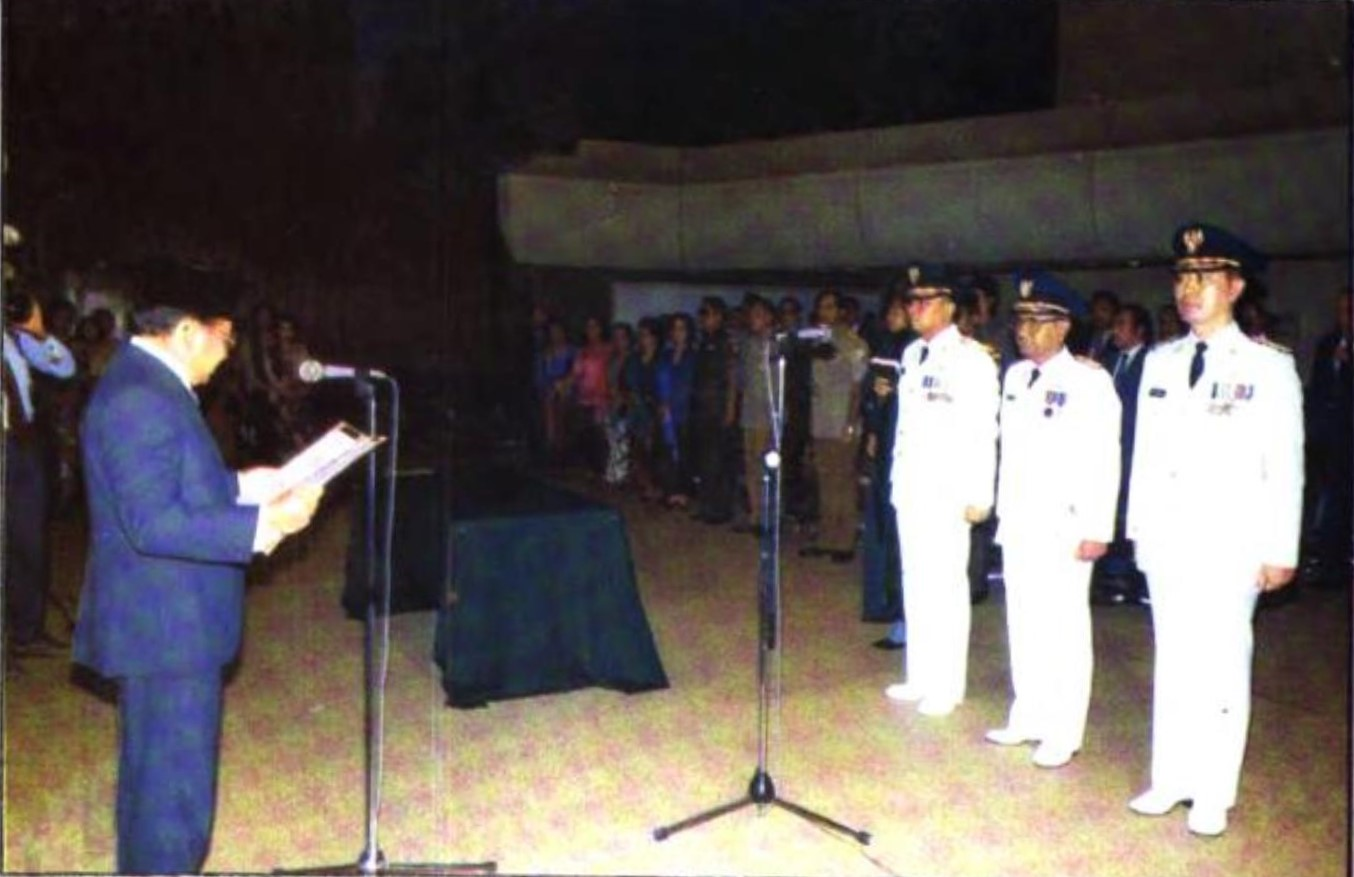
Inauguration of Soedradjat Nataatmadja (far left) as the Vice Governor of Irian Jaya.

Nataatmadja was inaugurated as the Vice Governor of Irian Jaya on 8 February 1989. He resigned from the office on 26 May 1993. The office was left vacant for four months until Basyir Bachtiar was inaugurated as the new Vice Governor on 21 September 1993.

== Inspector General of the Ministry of Internal Affairs ==
Following his resignation from the office of Vice Governor, Nataatmadja was promoted as the Inspector General of the Ministry of Internal Affairs in 1993. During his term, he handled various cases relating to the regional government in Indonesia, most notably the Sri Roso Sudarmo scandal. He ended his office on 25 September 1997, six days before he was inaugurated as a member of the People's Representative Council. He was replaced by Andi Jalal Bachtiar.

=== Inspection reform ===
Several months after his appointment as inspector general, Nataatmadja began a new program aimed at increasing the accountability of provincial governors. The program involved a joint inspection of the provincial inventory conducted by the inspectorate general, Financial and Development Supervisory Agency, and the Audit Board of Indonesia. Almost all provinces in Indonesia were reluctant to permit the joint inspection, except Southeast Sulawesi. The joint inspection began its task in Southeast Sulawesi in early 1994, and the results of the inspection were announced on 2 May 1994. Nataatmadja announced that the joint inspection found 192 cases of legal wrongdoings and maladministrations in the province.

Before 1995, the results of the joint inspection were only announced to the provincial government. After the joint inspections in Irian Jaya, the results of the joint inspection were announced to all of the parties involved in the inspection. The announcement was dubbed by Nataatmadja as the Gelar Pengawasan (Inspection Roll-Out).

On 10 October 1995, Nataatmadja announced his plans to inspect the works of governors and regents yearly. His first inspection was aimed at Abdul Azis Lamadjido, Governor of Central Sulawesi, who would end his second term in February 1996. For this inspection, Nataatmadja formed a team consisting of 25 officials from the inspectorate general.

=== Sri Roso Sudarmo scandal ===
Colonel Sri Roso Sudarmo, a regent in Bantul, was accused of bribing President Suharto's Dharmais Foundation with money amounted to Rp. 1 billion (US$111,000) in order to get himself reelected. After this case was made public, Minister of Internal Affairs Yogie Suardi Memet dispatched a team led by Nataatmadja to investigate the scandal. The investigation commenced on 7 December 1996.

The results of the investigation were announced in a press conference on 13 December. At the press conference, Nataatmadja stated that Sudarmo admitted that an unnamed mystic and his colleagues promised Sudarmo a second term if Sudarmo gave him Rp. 2.5 billion (US$277,500). However, after some bargaining, the mystic agreed to lower the price to 1 billion. The mystic then urged Sudarmo to sign a letter. After Sudarmo was elected to a second term, Sudarmo refused to pay the money. The mystic then leaked the letter to the media. Although the ministry had admitted that Sudarmo attempted to bribe a mystic, the ministry found no evidence of corruption or mishandling of village funds. Thus, the minister of internal affairs only gave Sudarmo a mild warning in the form of a written letter of dissatisfaction from the minister. The letter was delivered to Sudarmo five days after the investigation had commenced.

The media considered Nataatmadja and Sudarmo's explanation to be "intricate and unbelievable". Columnists from the Bernas newspaper questioned how a mystic could fool the regent, a 20-year veteran from the armed forces, and why Sudarmo would sign a letter that would implicate him far more than it did any alleged swindlers. However, Bernas failed to find any evidence contrary to the official explanation, and the question remained a mere supposition.

=== Organization ===
During his tenure as inspector general, Nataatmadja held several offices in various organizations. He was appointed as the Chairman of the Karate Kyushin-ryū from 1993 to 2001, advisor to the Union of West Javan Populace in Jakarta from 1995, advisor to the Union of National Construction Entrepreneur from 2000, Deputy Chair of the National Sports Committee of Indonesia from 1995 to 1998, and member of the National Council of the 45' Generation since 1993.

== Member of the People's Representative Council ==
After he resigned from the office of inspector general, Nataatmadja was nominated by the Golkar party as a candidate for the People's Representative Council representing South Kalimantan. When the party list of Golkar for the South Kalimantan constituency was announced, a coalition of fourteen different youth organizations in South Kalimantan protested Nataatmadja's nomination. Nataatmadja, along with several other candidates, were rejected and refused by the coalition due to their lack of notability in the province. However, the party was reluctant to remove Nataatmadja's name from the list and Nataatmadja was eventually elected to office.

In the council, Nataatmadja became the member of the committee for the amendment of the regional autonomy law. He stated his support for the implementation of regional autonomy in Indonesia. However, he also pointed out that the misinterpretation of the law could cause "little kings" — regents and governors who misuse their power — to flourish in Indonesia.

Nataatmadja was named as a possible candidate for the 1998 West Java gubernatorial election. He did not manage to contest the election.

== Later life ==
Nataatmadja retired from the military and bureaucracy and returned to his house in Bogor. In 2009, Nataatmadja became the commissioner of the Zebra Nusantara and the Steady Safe company.

== Personal life ==
Nataatmadja was married to Ratuningsih. They had two children, Sudarmadji and Ratuningrat.

Nataatmadja died at the Gatot Subroto Army Hospital in Jakarta on 6 December 2020.

== Awards and honours ==
Nataatmadja received the following honors :

- Star of the Armed Forces (8, 16, and 24 years) (?)
- Star of the Scouting Movement (1987)
- Star of the Department of Internal Affairs (1995)
- Award from the Pikiran Rakyat newspaper (2001)
