= Sodjuangon Situmorang =

Indonesian politician

Dr. Drs. Sodjuangon Situmorang M.Si.
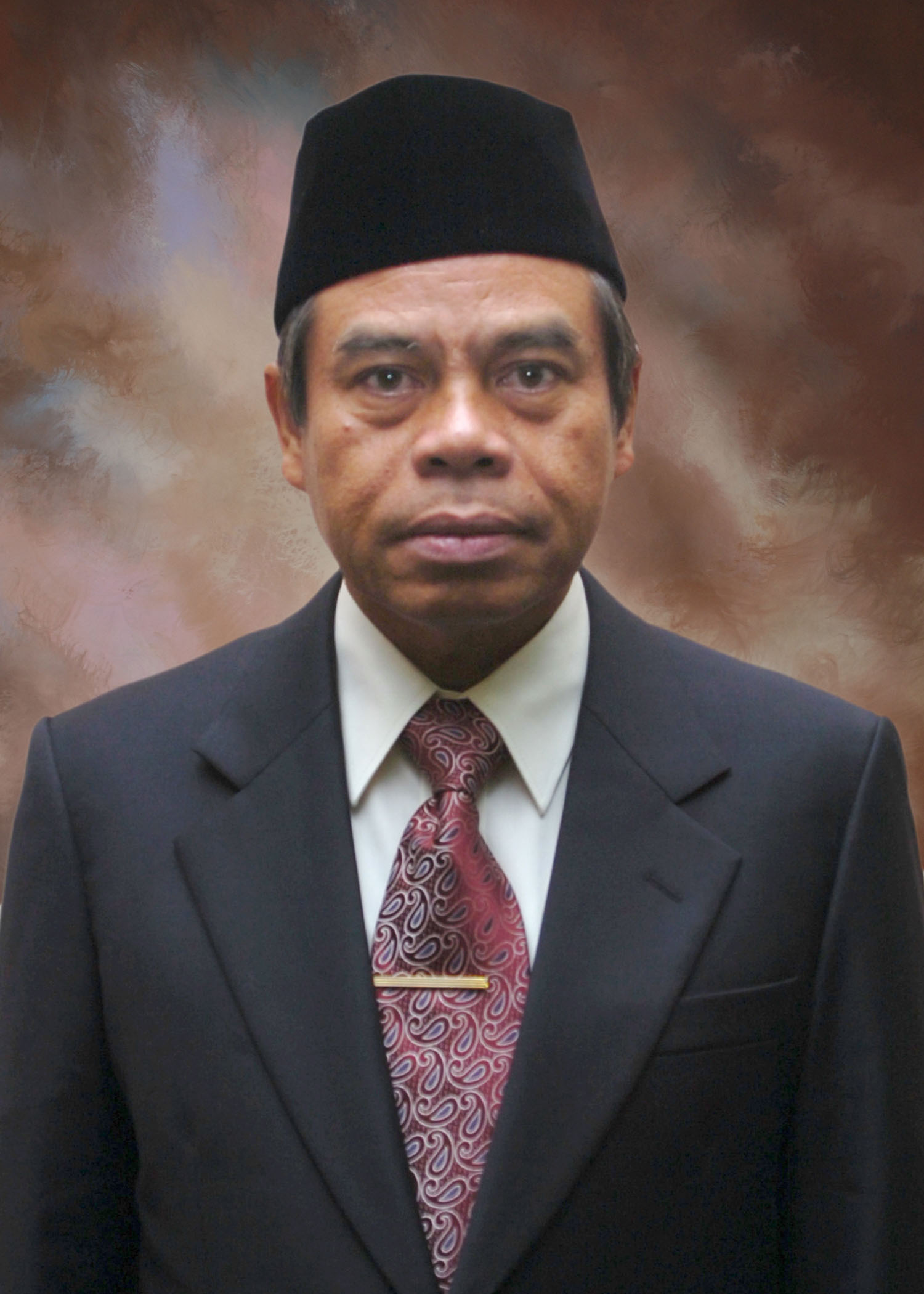

Director General of Regional Autonomy
- In office 7 January 2008 – 7 June 2009
- President: Susilo Bambang Yudhoyono
- Preceded by: Kausar Ali Saleh
- Succeeded by: Diah Anggraeni (acting); Djohermansyah Djohan

Governor of Papua (acting)
- In office 9 January 2006 – 25 July 2006
- President: Susilo Bambang Yudhoyono
- Preceded by: Jacobus Perviddya Solossa; Andi Baso Bassaleng (acting)
- Succeeded by: Barnabas Suebu

Director General of Public Government
- In office 12 May 2005 – 7 January 2008
- President: Susilo Bambang Yudhoyono
- Preceded by: Oentarto Sindung Mawardi
- Succeeded by: Kausar Ali Saleh

Governor of Central Kalimantan (acting)
- In office 23 March 2005 – 4 August 2005
- President: Susilo Bambang Yudhoyono
- Preceded by: Asmawi Agani
- Succeeded by: Agustin Teras Narang

Director General of Population Administration
- In office 19 October 2004 – 12 May 2005
- President: Susilo Bambang Yudhoyono
- Preceded by: Rohadi
- Succeeded by: Abdul Rasjid Saleh

Personal details
- Born: 7 June 1949 (age 76) Tarutung, North Tapanuli, Indonesia
- Spouse: Maria Endah Retno Susilawati

Sodjuangon Situmorang (born 7 June 1949) is an Indonesian bureaucrat who worked in the Department of Home Affairs and briefly in the office of the Coordinating Minister for Political, Legal, and Security Affairs as a deputy. Sodjuangon also held office as the acting governor of Central Kalimantan in 2005 and Papua in 2006.

== Early life and education ==
Sodjuangon was born on 7 June 1949 in Tarutung, which was part of the North Tapanuli Regency in North Sumatra.

Sodjuangan was a graduate of the Administration Faculty of the University of Indonesia. He continued his studies at the National Resilience Institute in 1997 and graduated in 1999.

== Career ==
Prior to his appointment as a director general in 2004, Sodjuangan worked at various levels in the Department of Internal Affairs. He started his career at the inspectorate general of the department, where he became the assistant inspector for government affairs to the Inspector for the 5th Region. Sodjuangan was later promoted and held office as the Inspector for Region V and later as the Region VII. Sodjuangan was later promoted again, and became the inspector general for the regional government in the Directorate General of Public and Regional Government.

After being relieved from inspectorate offices, Sodjuangan was appointed as the secretary to the Director General of Public and Regional Government. He was later posted to the Minister of Internal Affairs at that time, Hari Sabarno, in which he became Hari's expert staff on governance and later on law and politics. After his stint as an expert staff, he was appointed as the deputy to the Coordinating Minister for Political, Legal, and Security Affairs.

Sodjuangan was appointed a member of the investigation team for the Maluku sectarian conflict on 14 January 2002, representing the Communion of Churches in Indonesia. He signed the Malino II Accord as a mediator.

On 19 October 2004, Sodjuangan was inaugurated as Director General of Population Administration, replacing Rohadi. Shortly afterwards, he was also appointed as the chairman of the Aceh Assistance Team, which was tasked to complete the bill on Aceh autonomy. The team attempted to include a clause on pemekaran (province split) in the bill but it was not approved by the legislature in the final law.

Sodjuangan assumed office as the Acting Governor of West Kalimantan on 23 March 2005 after the previous governor, Asmawi Agani, decided to run in the Central Kalimantan gubernatorial election. Sodjuangan's main task as acting governor was to supervise and execute the gubernatorial election. Agani lost the elections to Agustin Teras Narang and Sodjuangan handed over the governorship to Narang on 4 August 2005.

In the midst of his tenure as acting governor, Sodjuangan was sworn in as the director general of public government on 12 May 2005. Several months into his new office, he was already named as a candidate for the acting governor of Papua after Governor JP Solossa announced his candidacy in the gubernatorial election. However, due to the lengthy bureaucracy, the election could not be held in the scheduled timespace, and Solossa's term was extended on 23 November 2005. Solossa suddenly died in office on 19 December and his regional secretary, Andi Baso Bassaleng, succeeded him as an acting governor the day after. Sodjuangan replaced Bassaleng as acting governor on 9 January 2006. His main task was identical to his previous tenure as acting governor.

The gubernatorial election was held three months after Sodjuangan took office. Barnabas Suebu, who had previously served as governor, won the elections, and Sodjuangan transferred his office to Suebu after the latter's inauguration on 25 July.

On 7 January 2008, Sodjuangan became the Director General of Regional Autonomy.

Sodjuangan reached the mandatory age of retirement on 7 June 2009 and subsequently resigned from his office. His office was assumed temporarily by the ministry's secretary general Diah Anggraeni.

== Later life ==
After his resignation, Sodjuangan became a president commissioner in the International Biometrics Indonesia.

== Personal life ==
Sodjuangan is married to Maria Endah Retno Susilawati.

Sodjuangan is a Protestant Christian and is of Toba Batak descent. As of 2019, he attended mass at the Menara Iman Protestant Church in Western Indonesia.

== Works ==
- Situmorang, Sodjuangan (1995). Biaya transaksi ekonomi Badan Usaha Milik Daerah: Studi kasus Badan Usaha Milik Daerah berbentuk perusahaan daerah dan perseroan terbatas di lingkungan DKI Jakarta (Doctorandus thesis). University of Indonesia.
- Situmorang, Sodjuangan (2002). Model pembagian urusan pemerintahan antara pemerintah, provinsi, dan kabupaten/kota (Doctorate thesis). University of Indonesia.
- Situmorang, Sodjuangon (7 November 2007). "Sinergi LAKIP – LPJ bagi Perwujudan Akuntabilitas" (PDF). Pusdiklatwas BPKP.
