= Agus Subekti =

Indonesian admiral

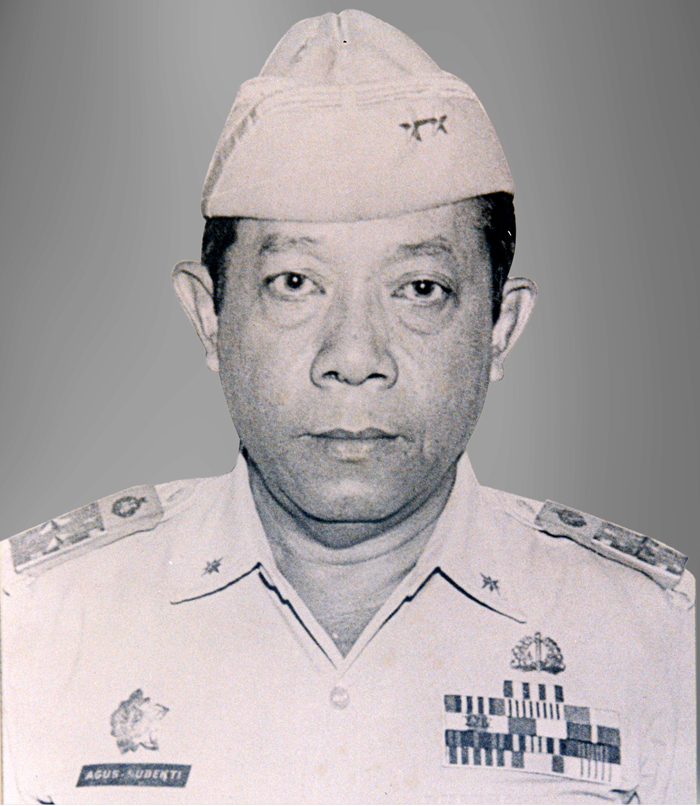

Vice Governor of West Irian
- In office 1 February 1964 – 1 July 1965
- President: Sukarno
- Governor: Eliezer Jan Bonay; Frans Kaisiepo
- Preceded by: Pamoedji
- Succeeded by: Mohammad Sarwono

Personal details
- Born: 5 April 1920 Semarang, Dutch East Indies
- Died: 31 January 1988 (aged 67) Jakarta, Indonesia

Military service
- Allegiance: Empire of Japan; Indonesia
- Branch/service: 1943–1945 (Imperial Japanese Navy); 1945–1975 (Indonesian Navy)
- Years of service: 1943–1975
- Rank: Rear Admiral
- Commands: Indonesian Marine Corps

Agus Subekti (5 April 1920 – 31 January 1988) was an Indonesian admiral who served as the first commander of the Indonesian Marine Corps and as the Vice Governor of West Irian from 1964 until 1965.

== Early life ==
Subekti was born on 5 April 1920 in Semarang, the capital of Central Java. Subekti begin his education at the Hollands Inlandsche School (elementary school for indigenous people) and graduated from the school in 1934. After his graduation from the school, Subekti enrolled at the Atmodirono Technische Avondschool, a technical evening school located in Surabaya. He took hydraulic engineering and architecture major in the school and graduated in 1938. From 1938, Subekti worked as an industrial officer in the Department of Economic Affairs in Semarang.

== Naval career ==
Following the Japanese occupation of the Dutch East Indies, the Department of Economic Affairs was dissolved, and Subekti became unemployed. His unemployment ended in 1943 when he entered the Naval Institute in Semarang and was put in command of one of its training ship. After the independence of Indonesia, all Japanese-established institute in the country was dissolved, including Subekti's Naval Institute. Subekti then joined the newly formed Indonesian Navy and became a coordinating officer on 23 August 1945.

During his early tenure in the navy, Subekti helped form the Marine Corps, which at that time was a special unit under the command of Tegal Naval Base. Subekti — at that time ranked sea major — was inaugurated as the Commander of the Marine Corps on 15 November 1945 with Naval Captain OB Sjaaf as his deputy.

In January 1947, the Tegal Naval Base experienced reorganization. Subekti was replaced by Achmad Djatmika Legawa as the commander of the Marine Corps, and he was promoted as the deputy commander of the Tegal Naval Base. Some time later, he became the commander of the naval base.

Subekti was transferred in 1948 and served as the Commander of the Basic Special Operation and Officer Course in Surakarta. A year later, Subekti was posted as a flag officer of the corvette Pati Unus. He was briefly posted Surabaya in 1950 as the acting chief of staff of the Surabaya Maritime Region. He was then reassigned several months later as a commander of KRI Marich.

In 1952, Subekti was put in command of a naval kesatrian (joint headquarters) in Ujung, Surabaya. On the same year, Subekti became an operational officer of the destroyer Gadjah Mada. He held the office for a year, as on 1 March 1953, Subekti was ordered to study at a supplementary course for naval officers and marine corps officers in Surabaya. He graduated from the supplementary course a few months later, as in the same year he was put in command of the 1st Corvette Division. He commanded the division for a year, and in 1954 he returned to his old post as the commander of the naval kesatrian in Ujung.

In 1956, Subekti was sent by the Chief of Staff of the Navy to study at the Defence Services Staff College in India for a year. Subekti returned to Indonesia and became the chief of staff of the Surabaya Maritime Region, an office he previously held in acting capacity. In 1959, he was put in command of the 6th Maritime Regional Command, which was based in Ambon and was responsible for the Maluku and West Irian fleet.

On 1 January 1961, Subekti was appointed as the naval attache to the Soviet Union. He held the office for two years until he returned to Indonesia to serve as the chief of staff of the Naval Staff and Command College.

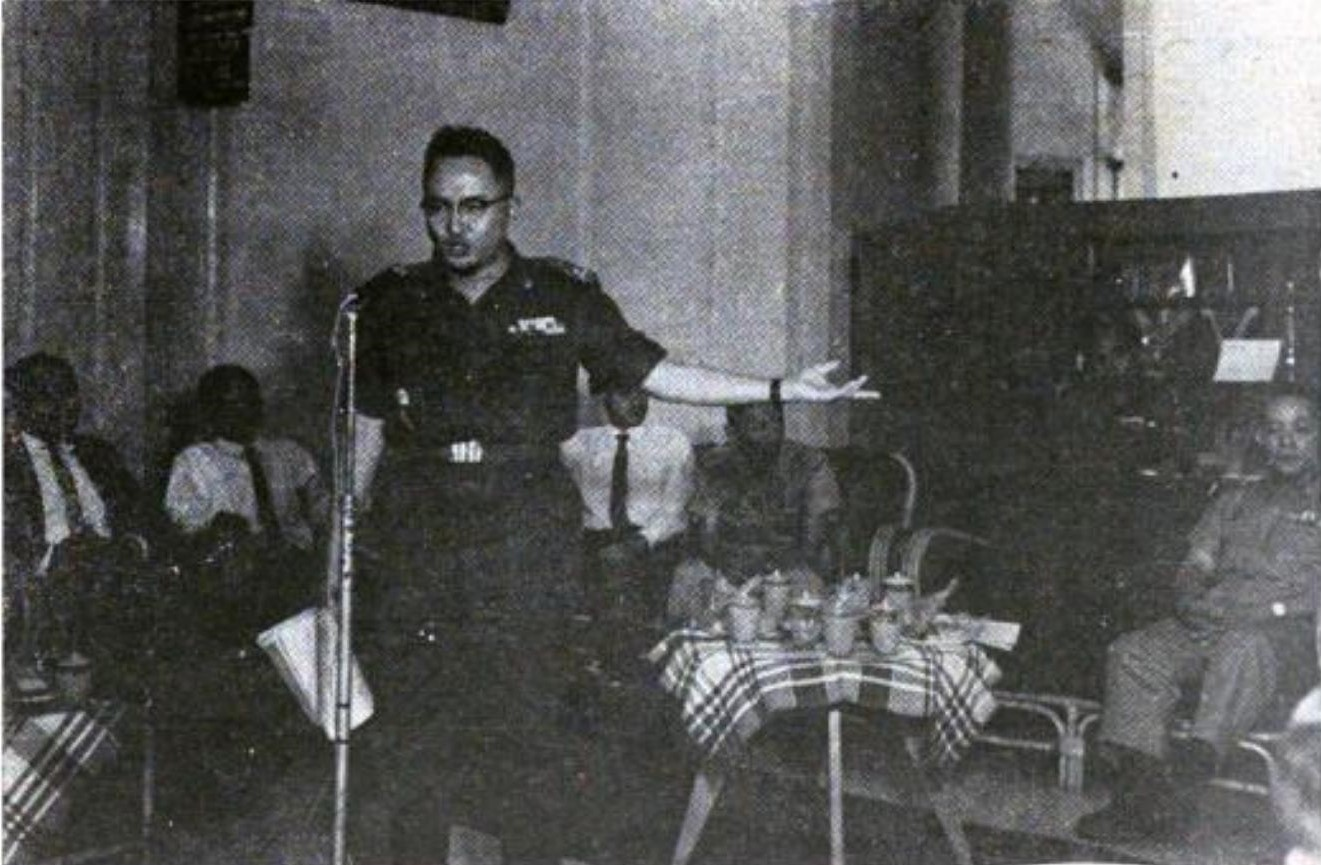
Coordinating Secretary for West Irian Affairs Sutjipto introducing Agus Subekti (right) as the new vice governor.

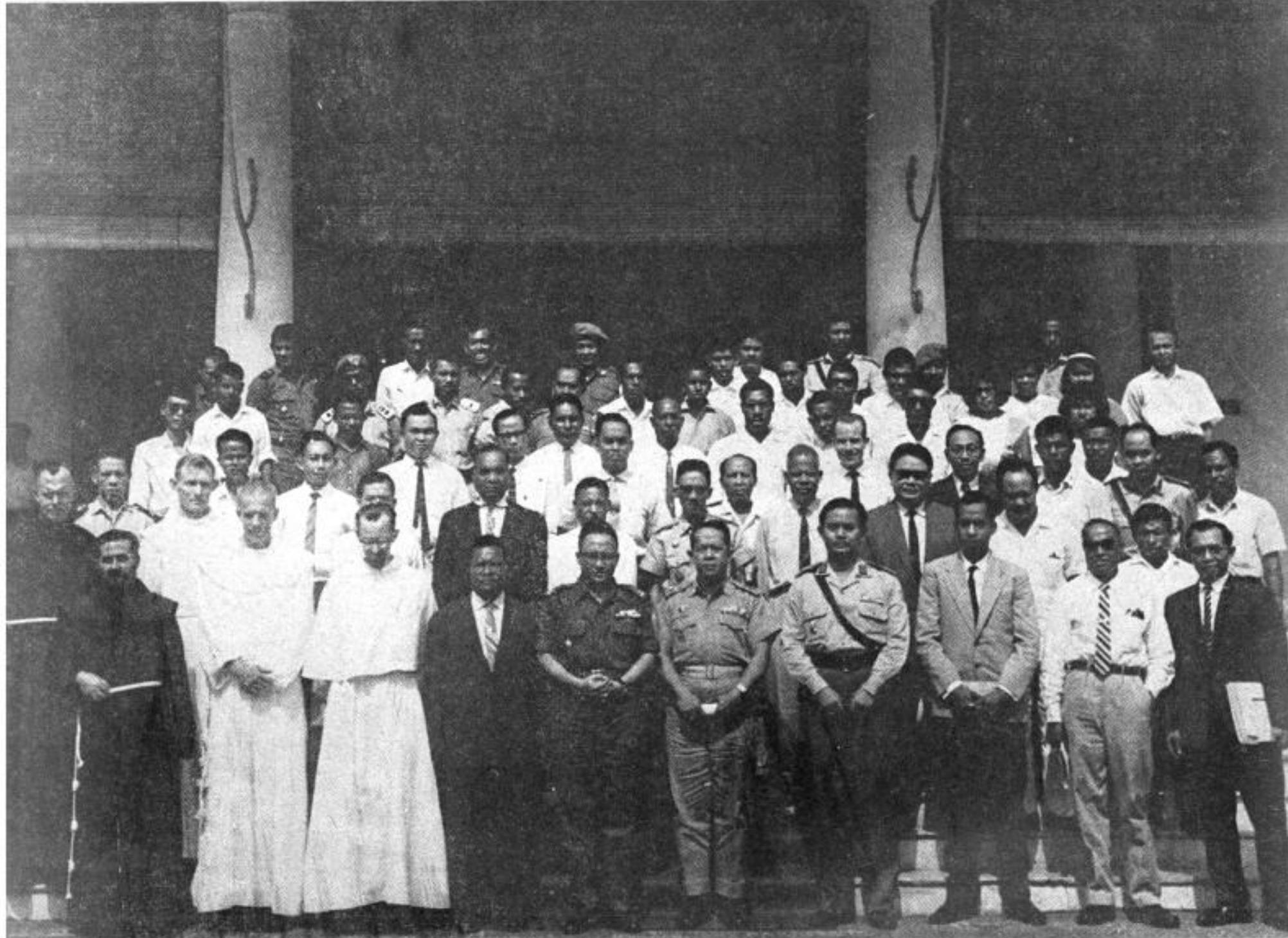
Agus Subekti (1st row, 6th from left) in a group photo with West Irian priests and bureaucrats.

Subekti received his first and only political appointment when he briefly became the Vice Governor of West Irian. He was appointed on 1 February 1964, replacing Pamoedji, who was also a naval officer. Aside from his office as vice governor, Subekti also held other offices, such as the First Deputy Speaker of the Regional People's Representative Council of West Irian and the Chairman of the Caturtunggal of West Irian. During his tenure, Subekti proposed to construct a naval school in Yos Sudarso Bay.

Subekti was honourably dismissed from his office as vice governor on 1 July 1965. After that, he was appointed as the Deputy Assistant for Functional Affairs to the Chief of Staff of the Indonesian Navy in 1966. A year later, Subekti was appointed as a flag secretary to the Chief of Staff of the Indonesian Navy. From 1968 until 1970, Subekti was put in command of the Naval Doctrine, Education and Training Development Command. During his tenure in the development command, Subekti led an orientation visit to the United States Navy. Subekti was also promoted from first admiral to rear admiral on 1 October 1970.

In 1971, Subekti was put as the commander of the 4th Naval Territory. As part of the dual function of the armed forces at that time, Subekti was ex officio appointed to civilian offices, such as member of the Functional Regional Council and a member of the People's Consultative Assembly from the Armed Forces. Subekti was dismissed from the office in 1973, and became a naval officer assisted to the Chief of Staff of the Indonesian Navy until he retired in 1975.

== Death ==
Subekti died in Jakarta, Indonesia, on 31 January 1988.
