= Lukas Enembe =

Indonesian politician (1967–2023)

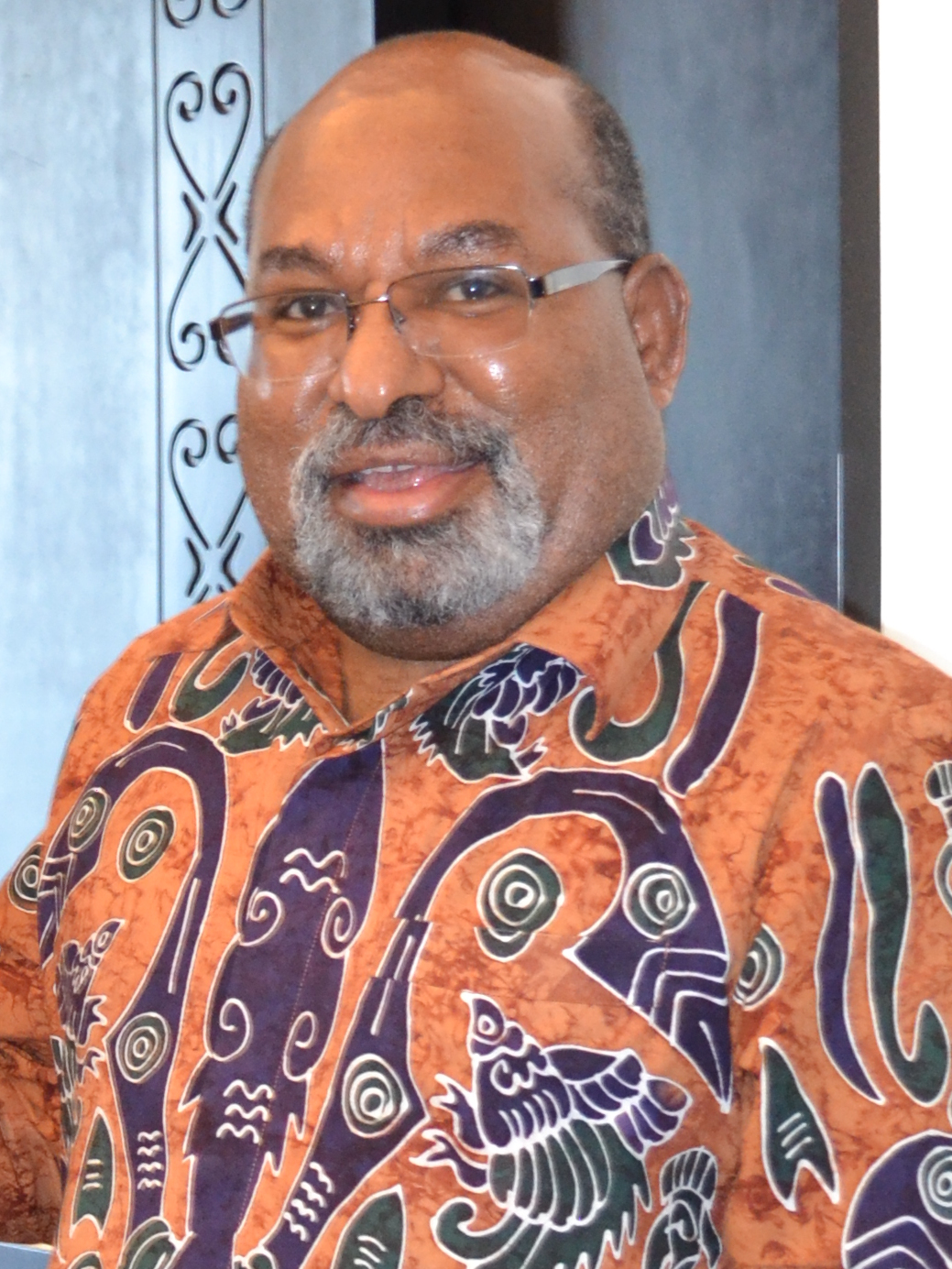
- Enembe in 2017

14th Governor of Papua
- In office 5 September 2018 – 5 September 2023 (Note: Non-active 11 January 2023 to 5 September 2023)
- Deputy: Klemen Tinal (2018–2021) vacant (2021–2023)
- Preceded by: Soedarmo (acting)
- Succeeded by: Ridwan Rumasukun (acting)
- In office 9 April 2013 – 26 February 2018
- Deputy: Klemen Tinal
- Preceded by: Barnabas Suebu; Constant Karma (acting)
- Succeeded by: Soedarmo (acting)

Regent of Puncak Jaya
- In office 2007–2012
- Deputy: Henock Ibo
- Preceded by: Elieser Renmaur
- Succeeded by: Henock Ibo

Personal details
- Born: 27 July 1967 Tolikara, Indonesia
- Died: 26 December 2023 (aged 56) Jakarta, Indonesia
- Citizenship: Indonesian
- Party: Democratic Party
- Spouse: Yulce Wenda
- Children: 3
- Education: Sam Ratulangi University Cornerstone Christian College
- Website: lukasenembe.com

Lukas Enembe (27 July 1967 – 26 December 2023) was an Indonesian politician from West Papua, who served as the 13th Governor of Papua Province from April 2013 to January 2023. He had previously served as Regent of Puncak Jaya Regency between 2007 and 2012, and Vice Regent of the same regency from 2001 until 2006.

In September 2017, Enembe was called on by the Corruption Eradication Commission as a suspect in a graft case, and later he was named as a witness in a graft case involving misappropriation of scholarship funds in Papua. Five years later, in September 2022, the Corruption Eradication Commission reported that Enembe was a suspect for misappropriation of government funds as he had spent the money in casinos in Singapore and Australia.

In January 2023, he was arrested by the Indonesian Corruption Eradication Commission.

== Early life and education, and early career ==
Lukas Enembe was born Lomato Enembe on 27 July 1967 in Kampung Mamit, Kembu District in what is now Tolikara Regency, to Tagolenggawak Enembe (father) and Deyaknobukwe Enumbi (mother). He spent his childhood in Tolikara, including his elementary school years; he studied at YPPGI Elementary School in Kampung Mamit and graduated in 1980. It was during his years in YPPGI Elementary that young Lomato began to be known as Lukas; he was frequently called Lukas by his teacher and friends, and the name was used ever since. He was a member of the Lani who inhabit Toli Valley in Highland Papua.

Originally after graduating elementary school, Lukas attempted to enroll in a junior high school in Mulia, Puncak Jaya Regency, where his mother came from; the plan was to find a relative from his mother's side to live with until he finished junior high school. Enembe could not find any of his mother's relatives; he then moved to Sentani, Jayapura Regency, to study in what is now SMP Negeri 1 Sentani (Sentani 1st State Junior High School) from 1980 until 1983. Immediately afterwards, he continued to study in SMA Negeri 3 Sentani (Sentani 3rd State Junior High School) and graduated in 1986. He then enrolled at Sam Ratulangi University in Sulawesi, studying political science. Enembe returned to Papua in 1995, and was accepted as a civil servant in 1996. He unsuccessfully tried to become a lecturer at Cenderawasih University in Jayapura, and later accepted an offer as a civil servant in Merauke Regency, Papua. From 1998 to 2001, Enembe studied at Cornerstone Christian College in New South Wales, Australia, having been sent there by a missionary agency.

== Political career ==
In 2001, Enembe unsuccessfully participated in the election to become regent of Puncak Jaya Regency. From 2001 to 2006 he served as Vice Regent of Puncak Jaya Regency alongside Elieser Renmaur. In 2006 he was elected to the chair of the local Papuan division of the Indonesian Democratic Party. Also in 2006 he unsuccessfully ran for the office of governor of Papua Province, initially with Muhammad Musa'ad, however Musa'ad was disqualified because of his ancestry. This decision sparked protests from his supporters, who alleged that the incumbent governor, J.P. Solossa, had influenced the assembly's decision in order to prevent Musa'ad from attracting Papuan Muslim voters in the election. Chaos ensued in the following days, with his supporters attacking the General Elections Commission as well threatening to burn down the assembly's office. Officials from the central government warned the assembly that it might overstep from its authority as a cultural advisory body. Musa'ad later found Arobi Ahmad Aituarauw, a Muslim banker and former senate candidate, part of Kaimana aristocracy, who agreed to replace him after no other replacement was found. Protests soon ceased after Enembe declared Aituarauw as his running mate. In 2007, he was elected as the regent of Puncak Jaya Regency. In 2013 Enembe successfully ran for the governorship of Papua Province, serving alongside Klemen Tinal as vice-governor, and was re-elected to the position alongside Tinal in 2018. Due to his arrest for alleged embezzlement, Enembe was declared "temporarily absent" as a governor. Ridwan Rumasukun, then Regional Secretary of Papua Province, was appointed as acting governor on 11 January 2023.

== Embezzlement allegations ==
In September 2017, Enembe was called on by the Corruption Eradication Commission as a suspect in a graft case; supporters of Enembe protested at the National Human Rights Commission, claiming that the issue was politicized due to the 2018 gubernatorial election in Papua. The Commission later named Enembe as a witness in a graft case involving misappropriation of scholarship funds in Papua, and Enembe met with the Commission face-to-face to clarify his wealth report.

In September 2022, it was reported that Enembe was under investigation by Indonesia's Anti-Corruption Commission for allegedly since 2017 having misappropriated 560 billion rupiah (approximately $56 million AUD) of state funds, reportedly spending a significant proportion of the money at casinos in Singapore and Australia. Enembe's reported official salary was less than AUD$1,000 (approximately 10 million rupiah) a month. Enembe denied the charges, claiming that they were politically motivated due to his membership in the Democratic Party. Enembe was declared as a suspect in the case, instead of merely a witness by the Corruption Eradication Commission.

During the investigation, Enembe claimed that he could not answer the summons by the Anti-Corruption Commission to go to Jakarta for questioning as he had problems speaking and moving, and he also had a neurological disorder. The Anti-Corruption Commission agreed to conduct the questioning in his own home. He was guarded by hundreds of his supporters armed with bows while being questioned by Indonesia's Anti-Corruption Commission in his own home.

=== Arrest ===
On 10 January 2023, Enembe was arrested by the Indonesian Corruption Eradication Commission. After his arrest, some of his supporters attacked an Indonesian National Police Mobile Brigade Corps base in Jayapura with arrows and rocks. Some of his supporters also carried sharp weapons, but his supporters were dispersed by the police without further incident. Nineteen of his supporters were arrested by the police. Enembe was immediately flown to Jakarta, and the police claimed that there were no further incidents in Jayapura. During the scuffle in Sentani Airport while Enembe was being flown out to Jakarta, three of his supporters were shot by the police. Two of them were injured, and one of them died.

=== Trial ===
Enembe was charged with accepting bribes and gratification totaling IDR 45.8 billion. IDR 10.4 billion came from Piton Enumbi, owner and director of PT Melonesia Mulia; PT Lingge-Lingge; PT Astrad Jaya and PT Melonesia Cahaya Timur, while IDR 35.4 billion came from Rijatono Lakka, director of PT Tabi Anugerah Pharmindo, PT Tabi Bangun Papua and owner of Manfaat CV Walibhu. Additionally, he faced charges for attempting to conceal the assets acquired through corruption by using someone else's identification, through Kael Kambuaya, head of the Public Works Department of Papua Province, and Gerius One Yoman, former head of the Public Works Department of Papua Province. The motive was so public work tenders by Papua province would be won by companies owned and operated by Lakka and Enumbi. Enembe rejected these charges, claiming that he was the most honest man in Papua.

While being in custody for his trial, his fellow cellmates complained that Enembe urinated on himself or on his bed and refused to clean up properly after defecating, creating great discomfort to his cellmates. He also refused to eat food or take medication for his health. Enembe's lawyer contended that his actions were not intentional; rather, Enembe genuinely struggled to manage his personal hygiene. His lawyers requested for him to be released from prison to be held as a city prisoner.

=== Conviction ===
The prosecutor sought a 10-year and 6-month prison sentence for Enembe, coupled with a fine of Rp.1 billion or alternatively, six months of imprisonment. Additionally, the prosecutor demanded Enembe to pay restitution amounting to Rp.47,833,485,350.

On 13 September 2023, the Corruption Criminal Court of the Central Jakarta District Court consider Enembe was proven guilty of taking bribe amounting to IDR 17.7 Billion and gratification amounting to IDR 1.99 Billion and sentenced Enembe with 8 years prison sentence and required a restitution payment of Rp.19,690,793,900. After appeal, on 7 December 2023, Jakarta High Court considered Enembe was proven guilty of the total corruption charge and sentenced Enembe to 10 years prison sentence and required a restitution payment of Rp. 47.833.485.350 or an additional 5-year prison sentence.

== Personal life ==
Enembe was married to Yulce Wenda, and had three children; Astract Bona T.M. Enembe, Eldorado Gamael Enumbi, and Dario Alvin Nells Isak Enembe.

The Lukas Enembe Stadium in Jayapura Regency, used as venue for the opening ceremony of Indonesia's 2020 National Sports Week, was named after him.

=== Death ===
Enembe died from kidney failure at the Gatot Soebroto Army Hospital, Jakarta, on 26 December 2023. He was 56. His body was scheduled to depart from Jakarta to Jayapura on 27 December for burial. His funeral was marred with riot in provincial capital Jayapura injuring several local citizens, CNN Indonesia journalist, government officials, and police officers, including acting governor Ridwan Rumasukun with dozens of local shops burned by rioters. A modified Morning Star flag bearing Star of David was displayed by the rioters. Presiding over the funeral, Rev. Dorman Wandikbo from GIDI apologized for the rioting caused by irresponsible bad actors, he implored out of respect for the deceased no further violent actions during the funeral event. Maj. Gen. Izaak Pangemanan from Cendrawasih Battalion accused KNPB infiltrated the funeral procession to sow discord and cause unrest.
