= John Djopari =

Indonesian politician

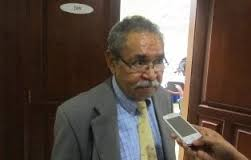

Indonesian Ambassador to Papua New Guinea
- In office 30 September 2002 – 18 October 2006
- Preceded by: Benny Mandalika
- Succeeded by: Bom Soerjanto

Vice Governor of Papua
- In office 1998 – 2000
- Preceded by: Basyir Bachtiar
- Succeeded by: Konstant Karma

Personal details
- Born: Johannes Rudolf Gerzon Djopari; 1 September 1950 Weinami, Geelvinkbaai, Netherlands New Guinea
- Died: 20 April 2013 (aged 62) Mitra Cibubur Hospital, Jakarta, Indonesia
- Education: University of Indonesia
- Occupation: Author, politician

Johannes "John" Rudolf Gerzon Djopari (1 September 1950 – 20 April 2013) was an Indonesian author and politician who served as the Vice Governor of Papua from 1998 until 2000 and the Indonesian Ambassador to Papua New Guinea from 2002 until 2006.

== Biography ==
Djopari was born in Weinami, Geelvinkbaai, Netherlands New Guinea, on 1 September 1950.

Djopari became the chief of subdistrict (camat) of Kurina from 1974 until 1978 and Wamena from 1978 until 1979. Djopari then enrolled on a postgraduate study at the University of Indonesia, and taught in the Institute for Internal Affairs Government (Institut Pemerintahan Dalam Negeri) as a lecturer after his graduation. In 1982, he was appointed by Busiri Suryowinoto as part of a team that gives written advices to Busiri about the province's split.

In 1993, Djopari wrote a book, Pemberontakan Organisasi Papua Merdeka ("The Rebellion of the Free Papua Movement"). The book was the second full study on the Free Papua Movement to appear in Indonesia. Although the book incorporates materials from the official book published by the Indonesian Army, it was banned by the Indonesian government. The ban was due to President Suharto's policy to ban any discussion about the Free Papua Movement.

Djopari was appointed as the Vice Governor of Papua in 1998, replacing Basyir Bachtiar. He was replaced by Konstant Karma in 2000. Djopari later became the Indonesian Ambassador to Papua New Guinea on 30 September 2002. He was replaced by Bom Soerjanto on 18 October 2006.

Djopari died at the Mitra Cibubur Hospital in Jakarta at 11:10 on 20 April 2013.
