= Basyir Bachtiar =

Military officer and politician

Brigadier General (Ret.) Basyir Bachtiar was a military officer and politician who served as the Vice Governor of Irian Jaya from 1993 until 1998.

Bachtiar was born on 12 August 1941 in Muara Enim, Sumatra. He enrolled in the National Military Academy, and graduated from the academy in 1964. Prior to his appointment as the Vice Governor of Irian Jaya, he was assigned office as the Secretary of the Inspector General of the Indonesian Army.

After the resignation of his predecessor, Soedardjat Nataatmadja, the government of Irian Jaya handed over the task of appointing a new vice governor to Irian Jaya's regional military commander, which at that time was held by E.E. Mangindaan. Mangindaan appointed Bachtiar as the vice governor, and he was inaugurated as vice governor on 21 September 1993. He was replaced by John Djopari in 1998.
