= Barnabas Suebu =

Indonesian politician

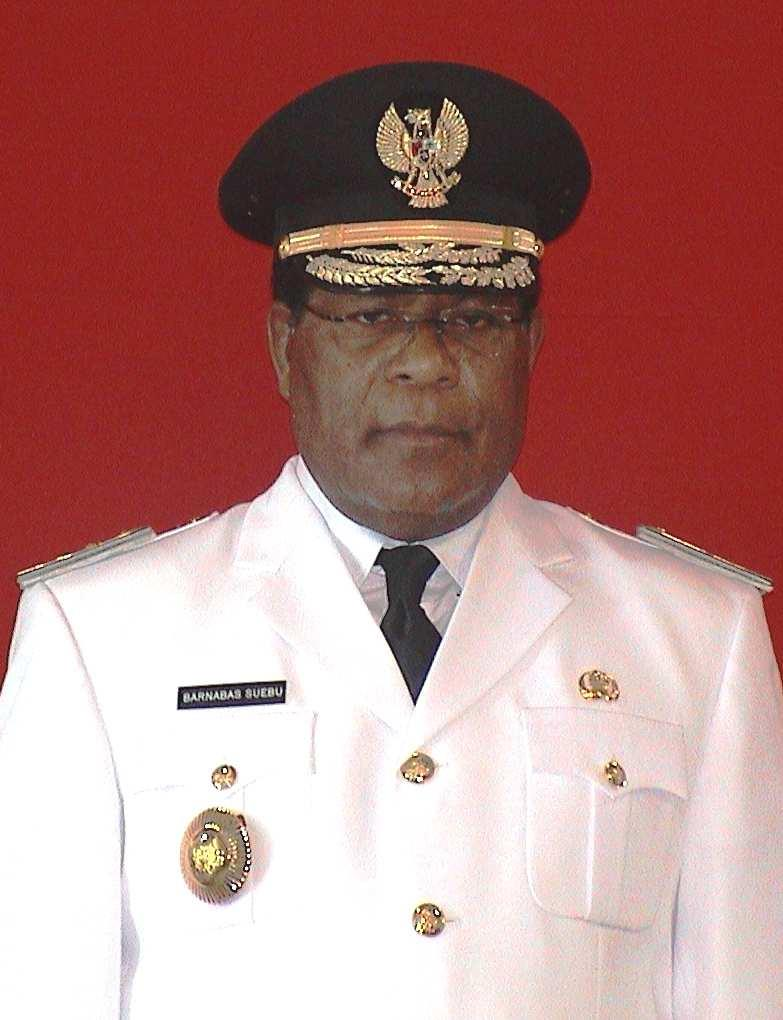

Governor of Papua
- In office 25 July 2006 – 25 July 2011
- President: Susilo Bambang Yudhoyono
- Deputy: Alex Hesegem
- Preceded by: Sodjuangon Situmorang
- Succeeded by: Syamsul Arief Rivai

Indonesian Ambassador to Mexico
- In office 17 January 1999 – 30 September 2002
- President: B. J. Habibie; Abdurrahman Wahid; Megawati Sukarnoputri
- Preceded by: Usman Hasan
- Succeeded by: Ahwil Luthan

Governor of Irian Jaya
- In office 13 April 1988 – 13 April 1993
- President: Soeharto
- Preceded by: Izaac Hindom
- Succeeded by: Jacob Pattipi

Personal details
- Born: April 29, 1946 (age 80) Sentani, Afdeeling Nieuw-Guinea, Dutch East Indies
- Party: Indonesian Democratic Party of Struggle (until December 2010); NasDem (since December 2010)
- Education: Cenderawasih University
- Occupation: Politician
- Known for: Governor of Papua, member of Congress, ambassador

Barnabas Suebu (born 29 April 1946) also known as Bas Suebu, is an Indonesian politician. He was the governor of the Indonesian province of Papua for two periods: 1988–1993 and 2006–2011. He wants to protect the province's forests, and has made plans to declare a moratorium on log exports and recommended that no new logging concessions be granted to timber companies. Suebu appeared on Time magazine's list of Heroes of the Environment October 2007.

== Early life, education, and career ==
Barnabas Suebu was born on 29 April 1946 in Sentani, Papua, to Bonifasius Suebu and Salomi Monim. Suebu obtained a Bachelor of Laws at Cenderawasih University in 1988. He was also a graduate from National Resilience Institute (Lemhanas) in 1984.

He was the chairman of Irian Jaya KNPI (Indonesian Youth National Committee) in 1974 and 1975, speaker of Irian Jaya Legislative Assembly (1987–1988), adviser to the Minister for Research and Technology, a member of Congress (1997–2002) and Indonesian ambassador to Mexico, Honduras and Panama (1999–2002).

== Personal life ==
Suebu is married and has six children.
