= Ermaya Suradinata =

Indonesian academic and civil servant (born 1954)

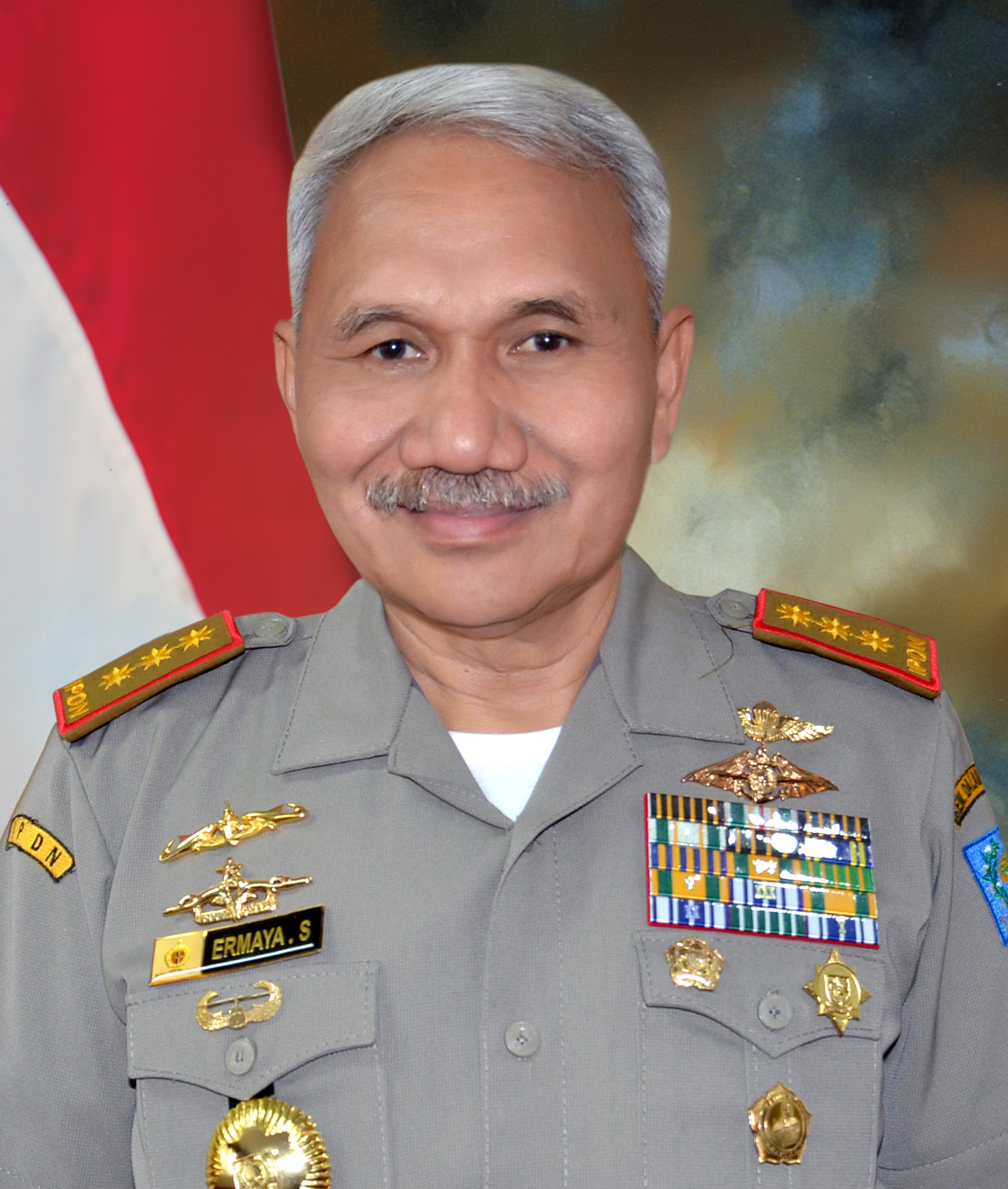

Rector of the Institute for Home Governance Affairs
- In office 1 July 2015 – 4 December 2018 (Note: Acting until 7 August 2015)
- Preceded by: Suhajar Diantoro
- Succeeded by: Murtir Jeddawi

Governor of the National Resilience Institute
- In office 15 February 2001 – 30 August 2005
- President: Megawati Sukarnoputri; Susilo Bambang Yudhoyono
- Preceded by: Johnny Lumintang
- Succeeded by: Muladi

Director General of National Unity and Societal Protection
- In office 3 March 2000 – 14 February 2001
- President: Megawati Sukarnoputri; Susilo Bambang Yudhoyono
- Preceded by: Ragam Santika
- Succeeded by: Muhanto A. Q.

Personal details
- Born: June 5, 1954 (age 71) Purwakarta, West Java, Indonesia
- Education: School of Administrative Sciences of the State Administration Institute; Padjadjaran University

Ermaya Suradinata (born 5 June 1954) is an Indonesian academic, civil servant, and former Governor of the National Resilience Institute of Indonesia (Lemhannas, Lembaga Ketahanan Nasional). He became the first civilian to lead Lemhannas, breaking a longstanding tradition of military leadership at the institution.

== Early life and education ==
Ermaya was born in Purwakarta, West Java, on 5 June 1954. He completed both his master’s and doctoral degrees with a near-perfect GPA of 3.99 by 1993. Ermaya later became a full professor in governmental management at the Institute for Home Governance Affairs and the Padjadjaran University in Bandung.

== Career ==
He began his public service career in 1972 as a low-ranking civil servant and a municipal police officer in Irian Jaya (now Papua). He then became the personal secretary to governor Soetran before being assigned to the provincial secretariat as the head of communication security. His career slowly rose in the provincial secretariat, becoming the head of administration, protocol, and work travels. He was then reassigned to the Department of Home Affairs training agency as the chief of population, law, and socio-political affairs. After obtaining his doctorate from the Padjadjaran University, he was appointed as the chief of education at the School for Governance Affairs in 1995. He then served as the Director for National Unity in the Home Affairs Department's Directorate General of Socio-Political Affairs.

His engagement with the military began in 1992, when General Feisal Tanjung invited him to teach management at the Indonesian Army Command and General Staff College. Over the years, Ermaya became a lecturer across numerous military institutions, including the Armed Forces Command and General Staff College, the Indonesian National Police Leadership and General Staff College, and several training centers of the Indonesian Army. He also held the academic position of the Director of the Postgraduate Program at the Satyagama University in Jakarta.

In light of the fall of Suharto and demands to reduce political intervention of the central government, Minister of Home Affairs Soerjadi Soedirdja announced the dissolution of the Directorate General of Socio-Political Affairs. The Directorate General of National Unity and Societal Protection was established in its place, and Ermaya was entrusted to lead the new agency on 3 March 2000. As director-general, Ermaya oversaw the abolishment of social-political offices, which acted as the Directorate General of Socio-Political Affairs representative offices in regions in Indonesia. Unlike the old directorate general, the new directorate general was only responsible in supervising and facilitating political affairs. He was replaced from the position by Muhanto A. Q. on 14 February 2001, a few weeks after he was announced as the Governor of the National Resilience Institute.

== Governor of the National Resilience Institute ==
On 15 February 2001, at the age of 47, Ermaya was appointed Governor of the National Resilience Institute, becoming the first civilian to lead the institute since its founding in 1965. His nomination, initially for the role of vice governor, came from then Minister of Defense Mahfud MD. Prior to his appointment, National Resilience Institute had been led exclusively by military generals, mostly from the Army. Suradinata's leadership marked a paradigm shift and symbolized the detachment of the institute from the defense department. He sought to reposition National Resilience Institute into national institution focusing on resilience from a civilian and multidimensional perspective. Ermaya also expanded National Resilience Institute' academic and intellectual framework to include a wider array of stakeholders. He also re-focused the institute to include a wide array of national issues and opened up internal discourse.

== Later career ==
After leading the National Resilience Institute, Ermaya joined the President University Foundation and became its rector. He held this position until 5 September 2012. In 2013, Ermaya became the deputy rector of the Institute of Home Governance Affairs, serving under rector Suhajar Diantoro. Suhajar became the expert staff of home affairs minister Tjahjo Kumolo on 1 July 2015 and Ermaya took over his duties as acting rector. A week after becoming acting rector, Ermaya gathered all officials in the institute in a "consolidation meeting". He permanently assumed the office on 7 August. According to Ermaya, he had held at least 49 different positions by the time he was appointed as rector.
