= List of commanders of the Pattimura Military Region =

This article lists military officers who have served as the commanders of the Pattimura Military Region from its formation in 1957 until now.

No.	Portrait	Name	Took office	Left office	Time in office	Source
1	Herman Pieters	Colonel; Herman Pieters (1924–1996)	26 June 1957	4 January 1961	3 years, 192 days	
2	Busiri Suryowinoto	Brigadier General; Busiri Suryowinoto (1926–1982)	4 January 1961	15 February 1966	5 years, 42 days	
3	Djohari	Brigadier General; Djohari	15 February 1966	28 August 1968	2 years, 164 days	
4	Poniman	Brigadier General; Poniman (1926–2010)	28 August 1968	17 March 1970	1 year, 354 days	
5	Wing Wiryawan Wirjodiprodjo	Brigadier General; Wing Wiryawan Wirjodiprodjo	17 March 1970	19 January 1974	3 years, 308 days	
6	Harun Soewardi	Brigadier General; Harun Soewardi (born 1926)	19 January 1974	2 March 1976	2 years, 43 days	
7	Abdul Rahman Suhodo	Brigadier General; Abdul Rahman Suhodo	2 March 1976	11 February 1978	1 year, 346 days	
8	Bagus Sumitro	Brigadier General; Bagus Sumitro	11 February 1978	24 July 1981	3 years, 160 days	
9	Sebastian Soekoso	Brigadier General; Sebastian Soekoso	24 July 1981	17 May 1983	3 years, 160 days	
10	Hasudungan Simanjuntak	Brigadier General; Hasudungan Simanjuntak	17 May 1983	7 May 1985	3 years, 160 days	
11	Max Markus Tamaela	Brigadier General; Max Markus Tamaela	15 May 1999	26 June 2000	1 year, 42 days	
12	I Made Yasa	Brigadier General; I Made Yasa	26 June 2000	2 July 2001	1 year, 6 days	
13	Mustopo	Brigadier General; Mustopo	2 July 2001	30 May 2002	332 days	
14	Djoko Santoso	Major General; Djoko Santoso (1952–2020)	30 May 2002	18 March 2003	292 days	
15	Agustadi Sasongko Purnomo	Major General; Agustadi Sasongko Purnomo (born 1952)	18 March 2003	29 December 2003	286 days	
16	Syarifuddin Sumah	Major General; Syarifuddin Sumah	29 December 2003	21 March 2006	2 years, 82 days	
17	Sudarmaidy Subandi	Major General; Sudarmaidy Subandi	21 March 2006	2 August 2007	1 year, 134 days	
18	Rasyid Qurnaen Aquary	Major General; Rasyid Qurnaen Aquary	2 August 2007	7 November 2008	1 year, 97 days	
19	M. Noer Muis	Major General; M. Noer Muis	7 November 2008	2 February 2010	1 year, 87 days	
19	Hatta Syafruddin	Major General; Hatta Syafruddin	2 February 2010	16 March 2011	1 year, 42 days	
20	Suharsono	Major General; Suharsono	16 March 2011	24 September 2012	1 year, 192 days	
21	Eko Wiratmoko	Major General; Eko Wiratmoko	24 September 2012	9 May 2014	1 year, 227 days	
22	Meris Wiryadi	Major General; Meris Wiryadi	9 May 2014	26 January 2015	262 days	
23	Wiyarto	Major General; Wiyarto	26 January 2015	7 August 2015	193 days	
24	Doni Monardo	Major General; Doni Monardo (born 1963)	7 August 2015	14 November 2017	2 years, 99 days	
25	Suko Pranoto	Major General; Suko Pranoto	14 November 2017	20 December 2018	1 year, 36 days	
26	Marga Taufiq	Major General; Marga Taufiq	20 December 2018	24 July 2020	1 year, 217 days	
27	Agus Rohman	Major General; Agus Rohman	24 July 2020		4 years, 225 days	
