= Euis =

- Euis given name in Standard Sundanese script
- Pronunciation: Euis (Sundanese Alphabet)
- Gender: Feminine
- Language: Sundanese

Origin
- Language: Old Sundanese
- Meaning: Handsome
- Region of origin: Indonesia

Other names
- Variant forms: Elis, Deulis, Iis
- Nickname: Is

Euis (Sundanese: ᮉᮄᮞ᮪, romanized: Euis, Sundanese pronunciation: [ɤis]) is a female Sundanese given name. It is derived from the Sundanese root word Geulis (ᮉᮄᮞ᮪), meaning beautiful. Other forms of this name are Elis (ᮈᮜᮤᮞ᮪), Deuis (ᮓᮩᮄᮞ᮪), and Iis (ᮄᮄᮞ᮪).

Euis as first name was found 161 times in 8 different countries.

== Possible meanings ==
The meaning of the name Euis depends on the language used.

- In Sundanese, Euis derived from Geulis, means "beautiful".
- In Indonesian, Euis means "a peaceful, independent, happy and perfect way of life".

== Notable people with this name ==
- Euis Darliah, an Indonesian singer who was once famous for the song "Apanya Dong" by Titiek Puspa.
- Euis Sunarti, a professor at the Bogor Agricultural Institute (1987) in the field of family resilience and empowerment.
