= Sukanda Kartasasmita =

Indonesian politician (1935–1998)

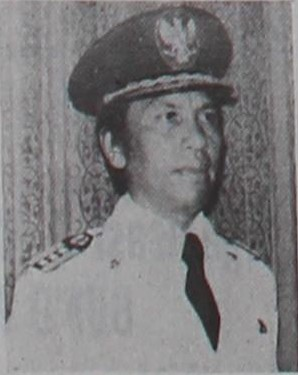
- Sukanda Kartasasmita in 1988

Member of House of Representatives
- In office 1 October 1997 – 28 November 1998
- President: Soeharto; B. J. Habibie
- Constituency: West Java

Regent of Subang
- In office 21 November 1978 – 21 November 1988
- Governor: Aang Kunaefi; Yogie Suardi Memet
- Preceded by: Atju Syamsudin
- Succeeded by: Oman Sachroni

Member of West Java Regional House of Representatives
- In office 1971–1978

Personal details
- Born: 13 January 1935 Cirebon, Dutch East Indies
- Died: 28 November 1998 (aged 63) Jakarta, Indonesia
- Party: Golkar
- Spouse: Milly Sudewi
- Children: 4, including Arief Sjamsulaksan Kartasasmita
- Education: IPB University (Ir.)
- Profession: Politician

Sukanda Kartasasmita (13 January 1935 – 28 November 1998) was a politician from West Java who served as the Regent of Subang from 1978 to 1988. Throughout his career, he held various public offices, including serving as a Member of the West Java Regional People's Representative Council (DPRD) from 1971 to 1978 and as a Member of the House of Representatives (DPR-RI) from 1997 to 1998. In addition to his political career, he was known as the founder of a Sundanese magazine Manglé.

Born in Cirebon on 13 January 1935, Kartasasmita completed his high school education in 1955. He graduated from the Bogor Agricultural Institute (IPB) in 1964 and continued his studies at the University of Wisconsin–Madison for one year. After returning to Indonesia, he worked as a lecturer at Padjadjaran University and also served as the editor-in-chief of Baranangsiang magazine. In 1971, he was elected as a Member of the West Java Regional People's Representative Council (DPRD). During his tenure in the West Java DPRD, he held various positions within both the organization and the political party structures.

Kartasasmita was elected Regent of Subang in 1978 and held the position until 1988. As regent, he implemented development programs in the economic, infrastructure, environmental management, education, and agriculture sectors. In addition, he helped promote the traditional performing art of Sisingaan and actively supported the Family Planning program. In recognition of his contributions to the development of Subang, he was awarded the Satyalancana Pembangunan (Development Merit Medal).

After completing his tenure as Regent of Subang, Kartasasmita served as a special staff member at the Ministry of Women's Empowerment and Child Protection. He was later elected to the House of Representatives of the Republic of Indonesia (DPR-RI) for the 1997–2002 term. Kartasasmita died on 28 November 1998 and was buried at Pasawahan Public Cemetery.

== Early life and education ==
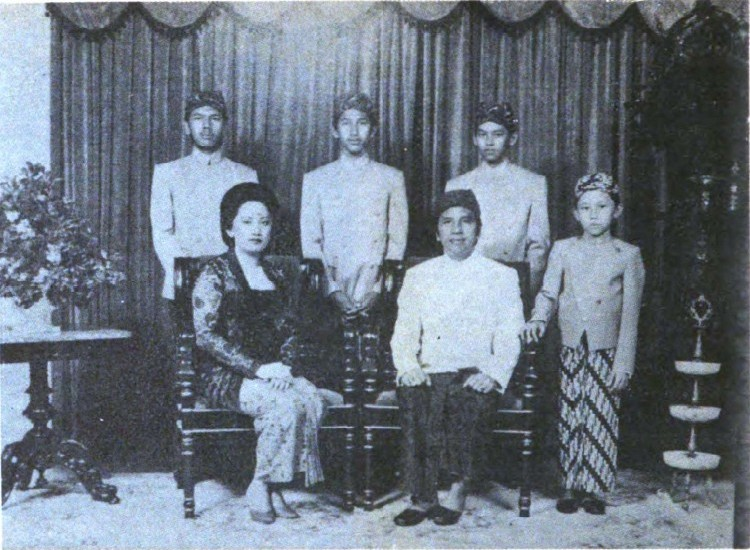
Sukanda Kartasasmita's family in 1987

Kartasasmita was born in Cirebon on 13 January 1935. He completed his elementary school education in 1948, junior high school in 1952, and senior high school in 1955. After completing his secondary education in 1955, he pursued higher education at the Bogor Agricultural Institute (IPB), where he earned an agricultural engineering degree in 1964. He subsequently undertook graduate studies at the University of Wisconsin–Madison from 1964 to 1965; however, he did not earn a degree.

== Early career ==
Before entering politics, Kartasasmita worked as a lecturer at the Faculty of Agriculture, Padjadjaran University. Together with Oeton Moechtar, Rochamina Sudarmika, Saleh Danasasmita, and Wahyu Wibisana, he was also one of the founders of Manglé magazine, which was established on 21 November 1957. In 1967, he became the editor-in-chief of Baranangsiang magazine. In addition, he served as the Vice Chairman of Manglé magazine.

In the 1971 election, Kartasasmita was elected as a member of the West Java Regional People's Representative Council (DPRD) from Golkar. During his tenure as MP from 1971 to 1977, he served as Chairman of the Indonesian Civil Servants Corps (KORPRI) Unit of Padjadjaran University (UNPAD), Chairman of the West Java branch of the Indonesian Farmers' Harmony Association (HKTI), and Assistant Secretary for Farmers and Fishermen Affairs of Golkar West Java. Although he was included as a provisional candidate for a seat in the House of Representatives (DPR-RI) from the West Java electoral district in 1976, he was re-elected to the West Java DPRD in the 1977 election.

== Regent of Subang ==
When Atju Syamsudin's term as Regent of Subang ended in 1978, an election was held to choose his successor. Three candidates contested the position: Mohamad Amin, Sukanda Kartasasmita, and Saleh. Among the three candidates, Kartasasmita, from the Development Works Faction, was elected regent and inaugurated on 21 November 1978. He served as a Regent of Subang for 10 years.

During his tenure as Regent of Subang, Kartasasmita implemented a series of development programs. Within these initiatives, he placed particular emphasis on the trade sector, which he believed had a strong capacity to generate employment opportunities. He was also known for a leadership style that resembled that of a legislator rather than an executive administrator. In addition to his duties as Regent of Subang, he served as Chairman of the Advisory Council of Golkar Subang Regency branch.

=== Economy ===
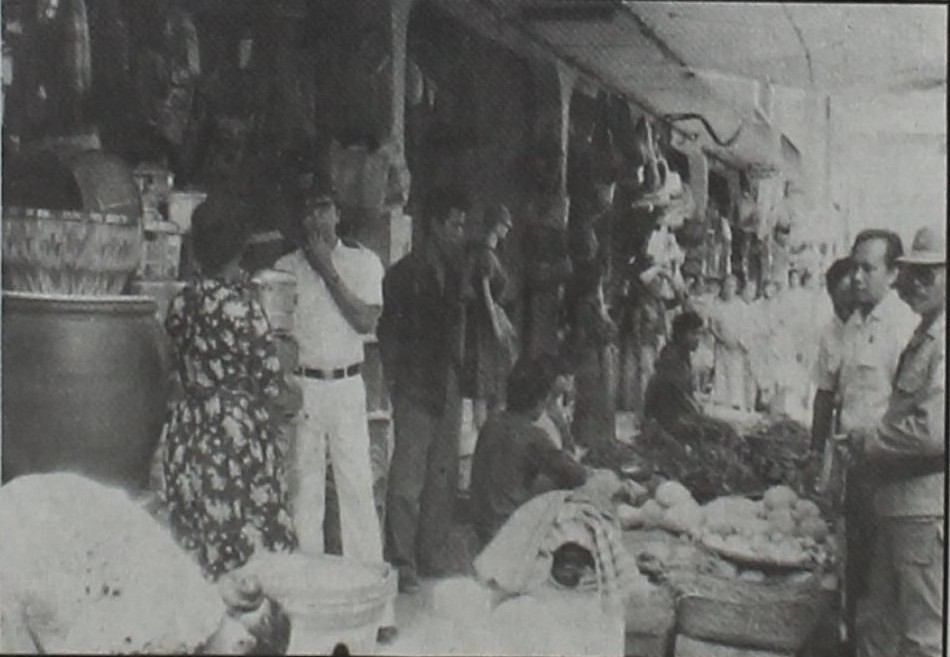
Kartasasmita spoke with a vegetable vendor at Pamanukan Market in 1987.

During Kartasasmita's administration, he carried out programs to strengthen economic institutions, particularly cooperatives. Furthermore, he conducted public outreach and educational campaigns to increase public trust and strengthen the cooperatives. On 14 May 1983, he inaugurated 37 managers of Village Unit Cooperatives in Subang as civil servants. This measure was intended to boost the vitality and development of village cooperatives.

In entrepreneurship, Kartasasmita provided business facilities in Inpress markets (markets established by government funds under Presidential Instruction No. 5 of 1981), private shops, and government-owned kiosks, as well as bank credit recommendations for small-scale entrepreneurs. He also offered training programs and business capital assistance to support entrepreneurs. In September 1983, he established a mass loan repayment task force to address overdue credit obligations, as outstanding loans in Subang Regency had reached Rp3 billion by September 1982. One contributing factor was the reluctance of many Subang residents, particularly non-farmers groups, to repay their debts.

=== Infrastructure ===
In the infrastructure sector, Kartasasmita oversaw the restoration of the Pancasila Fortress Monument in Subang in 1980. He subsequently initiated the construction of Gedung Juang in Subang in 1981. In 1986, the Subang Regency Government built the Islamic Da'wah Building (Gedung Dakwah Islamiyyah) to facilitate the da'wah of Islamic teachings. In the same year, he stated that the number of mosques in Subang Regency had increased from 162 in 1979 to 962 in 1986.

Kartasasmita also collaborated with private companies to develop shopping centers, cinemas, and the Ciheuleut Indah Housing Complex. Moreover, he relocated street vendors to a food court located on the site of the former Subang Bus Terminal and the Subang Market, which had been destroyed by fire in 1984.

=== Bureaucracy ===
On 29 May 1984, Kartasasmita dismissed of 230 regional contract employees. This action was taken because the employees had been hired by the Head of Personnel Affairs without the regent's consent and also as part of efforts to improve the financial efficiency of the Subang Regency Government. As compensation, he paid each dismissed employee Rp15,000 (approximately Rp290,944 in 2026). In May 1986, he issued a decree ordering an investigation and follow-up actions concerning Subang regional government civil servants suspected of using fraudulent diplomas.

Karsasmita also implemented policies on new village formation (pemekaran desa). In 1982, Subang had 10 new villages created by dividing existing villages. This was done because smaller administrative areas were considered easier to manage and could provide more efficient public services.

=== Agriculture and environment ===
During Kartasasmita's leadership, farmers and agricultural extension workers were assigned to participate in the rice intensification program, Supra Insus, which began in April 1987 with the aim of increasing rice production to 9 tons per hectare of paddy field. He also once promised a hajj reward to the Subang special intensification farmers (Insus) group if they became national champions, with the costs covered by the Subang Regency Government.

Rice production also increased during Kartasasmita's leadership, rising from only 3.2 tons in 1968 to 899,676 tons in 1986. In 1981, rice production increased by 13% compared to the previous year, due to improvements in the five principles of farming (panca usaha tani) and farmers’ preparedness, which helped them avoid pest outbreaks. Increases in the production of other agricultural commodities also occurred, including secondary crops and fruits.

Subang also became a contributor of rice to the national food supply. In 1984, Subang contributed 33,782 tons. This amount increased in 1986, when the region contributed 37,413 tons. Thanks to increased production, Subang earned the nickname “rice granary” of West Java.

Kartasasmita also carried out reforestation on 2,270 hectares of critical land on 20 January 1982 as part of the efforts to support the success of the 21st National Greening Week.

To address land issues in Subang, Kartasasmita launched the “Catur Tertib Operation.” Through this operation, he proposed granting ownership rights over state land to 116 households and also facilitated land certification for the public, the Subang Regency Government, and various institutions.

Seeing that many giant leucaena plants (Leucaena leucocephala subsp. glabrata) had died due to psyllid attacks, Kartasasmita implemented a policy of releasing predators of beetles (Note: The beetle species was Curinus coeruleus, a deep-blue beetle that preys on agricultural pests.) in plantations and community farmlands. The initial release of the beetles took place on 16 December 1987 at the Kasomalang Kulon Tea Plantation in Jalancagak.

Thanks to his achievements in agriculture, Kartasasmita received certificates of appreciation from the president, various ministers, and the governor of West Java.

=== Social ===
Kartasasmita implemented the Family Planning program in Subang Regency. In carrying out the KB program, he chose to promote the use of intrauterine devices (IUDs) rather than pills or injections. This approach was taken due to the high rate of failure associated with pill- or injection-based contraception. The Indonesian Armed Forces magazine Dharmasena praised the use of IUDs as an effective measure. In addition, he also introduced guidance and rehabilitation programs for the sex workers. He also launched an illiteracy eradication program in hundreds of villages across Subang Regency.

=== Art ===
Before Kartasasmita became regent, Sisingaan had various names and different performing groups which were Gotong Singa, Singa Ungkleuk, Singa Depok, Kuda Ungkleuk, Pergosi, and Odong-odong. During his tenure, he unified the various Sisingaan groups and standardized the art form through a Sisingaan seminar. On 15 April 1983, he inaugurated a cultural center and amusement park located on Jl. Otto Iskandardinata, Subang.

== Later career and death ==
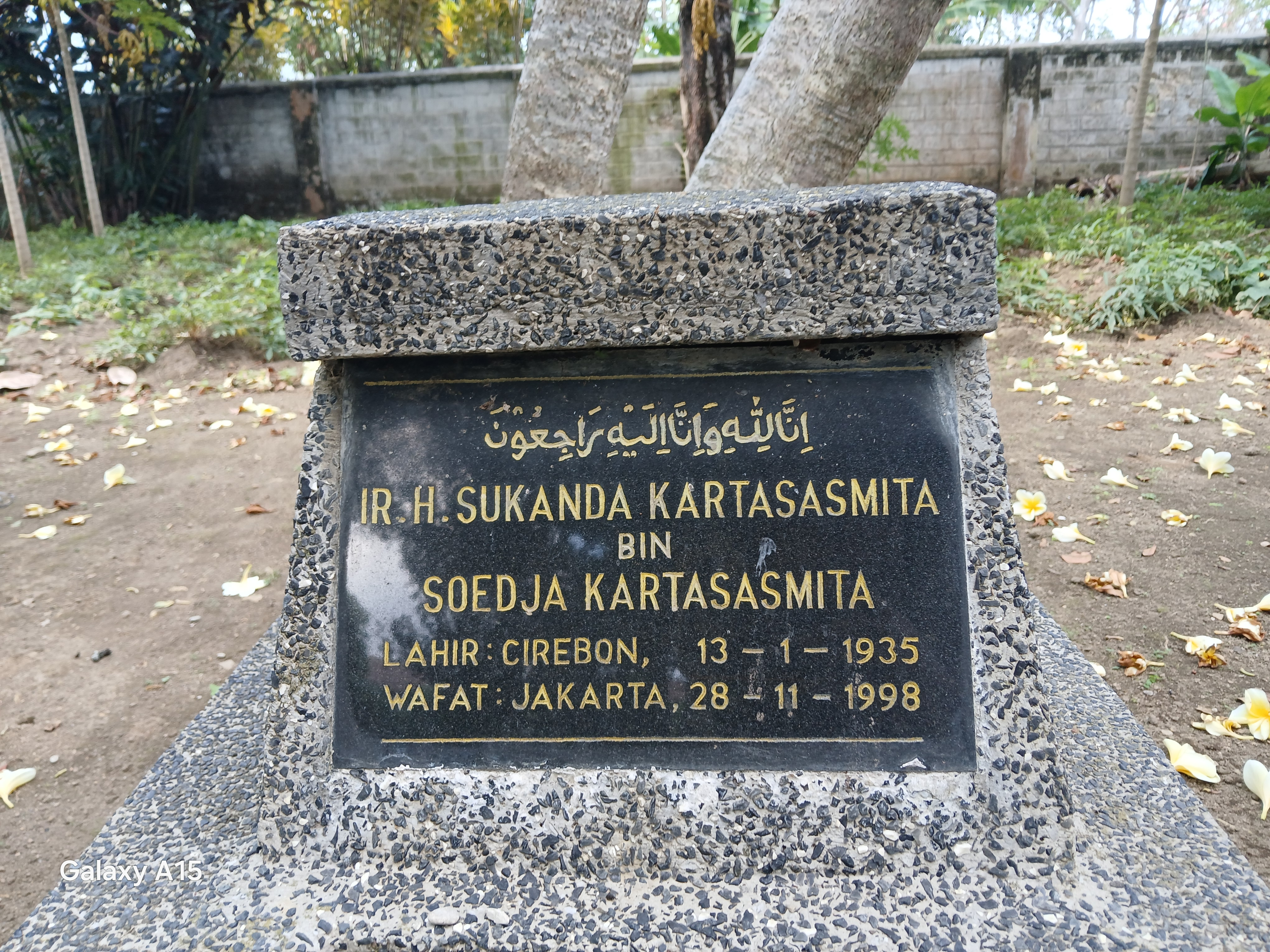
The gravestone of Sukanda Kartasasmita at Pasawahan Public Cemetery.

Kartasasmita joined Commission D of Golkar during the 4th Golkar National Conference in October 1988. This commission discussed the draft of a political statement. In May 1989, he was appointed as one of the 11 chairpersons of the Indonesian Farmers’ Harmony Association. He later served as an expert staff member of sociology at the State Minister for the Role of Women in 1992.

In the 1997 general election, he was elected to the House of Representatives for the 1997–2002 term, representing West Java for the Golkar Party. As a parliament member, he was part of a working visit team for poverty-alleviation projects in Jakarta and West Java from 27 July 1998 to 1 August 1998.

Kartasasmita died on 28 November 1998 in Jakarta. He was buried at the Pasawahan Public Cemetery in Pananjung, Tarogong Kaler, Garut.

== Personal life ==
Kartasasmita was married to Milly Sudewi, and the couple had four children. One of their children, Arief Sjamsulaksan Kartasasmita, served as the Rector of Padjadjaran University.

== Awards ==
- Medal for Contributing in the National Development on cooperative sector.

== Bibliography ==
- Golkar, Golkar (1988). Musyawarah Nasional IV Golongan Karya tanggal 20 s/d 25 Oktober 1988 di Jakarta. Golkar.
- Iskandar, Adi Mercy (1987). "Karya Utama: Subang Tandang Memacu Pembangunan". Dharmashena. Jakarta: Departemen Penerangan.
