= Oman Sachroni =

Indonesian bureaucrat

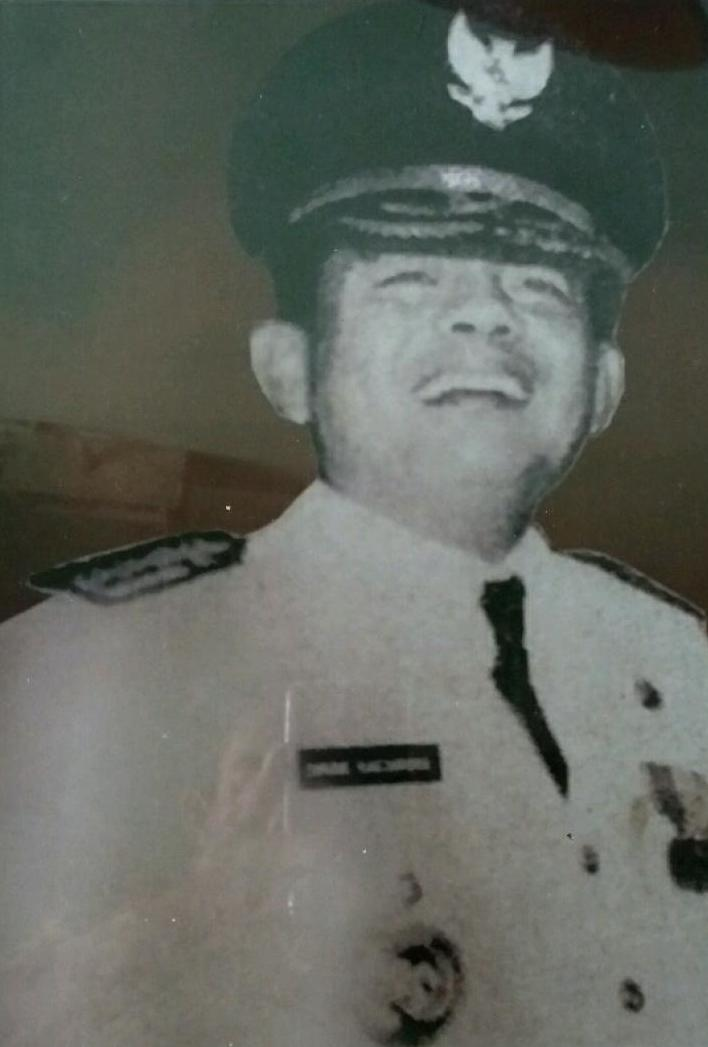

Head of the National Archives
- In office 3 June 2003 – 6 July 2004
- President: Megawati Sukarnoputri
- Preceded by: Mukhlis Paeni
- Succeeded by: Djoko Utomo

Governor of Lampung (acting)
- In office 7 October 1997 – 26 January 1998
- Preceded by: Poedjono Pranyoto
- Succeeded by: Oemarsono

Director General for General Government and Regional Autonomy
- In office 4 October 1996 – 1 July 1998
- Minister: Yogie Suardi Memet; R. Hartono; Syarwan Hamid
- Preceded by: Sumitro Maskun
- Succeeded by: Ryaas Rasyid

Regent of Subang
- In office 21 November 1988 – 21 November 1993
- Governor: Yogie Suardi Memet; R. Nuriana
- Preceded by: Sukanda Kartasasmita
- Succeeded by: Abdul Wachyan

Regent of Lebak
- In office 1983–1988
- Governor: Aang Kunaefi; Yogie Suardi Memet
- Preceded by: Dana Sudarna
- Succeeded by: Endang Suwarna

Personal details
- Born: 4 April 1944 (age 82) Bandung, Japanese Dutch East Indies

Oman Sachroni (born 4 April 1944) is an Indonesian bureaucrat who served as the Head of the National Archives from 2003 until his retirement in 2004. Previously, he worked in the Ministry of Home Affairs as the Regent of Lebak from 1983 until 1988, Regent of Subang from 1988 until 1993, and as the Director General for General Government and Regional Autonomy from 1996 until 1998.

== Early life and education ==
Oman Sachroni was born on 4 April 1944 in Bandung. After graduating from high school, Sachroni entered the Academy for Home Government and finished in 1966. He pursued further studies in governance at the Institute for Governance Sciences and obtained an undergraduate degree in governance sciences in 1972.

== Bureaucratic career ==
Sachroni started his bureaucratic career as a district civil servant. After graduating from the Institute for Governance Sciences, he was made as the assistant for staffing affairs in Bekasi Regency. A year later, he was named as the head of the development sub-directorate in the Bekasi Government. He became the Regional Secretary of the Bekasi Regency from 1974 until 1983.

After serving as secretary, Sachroni was appointed to regents in two different region. He was first appointed for the position in Lebak from 1983 until 1988, and in Subang from 1988 until 1993. He entered the central office of the Ministry of Home Affairs in 1993 and become the Director for Regional Government in the ministry.

On 4 October 1996, Sachroni became the Director General for General Government and Regional Autonomy in the ministry, replacing the retiring Sumitro Maskun. During this period, he was assigned as the acting governor of Lampung, temporarily replacing Poedjono Pranyoto who was elected as a deputy speaker in the People's Consultative Assembly. Sachroni was tasked to held a parliamentary election to elect a new, definitive governor. Oemarsono, Pranyoto's deputy, was elected as governor and Sachroni handed over the governorship to him in early 1998. He was replaced as director general in July 1998 and become an expert staff to the minister.

After several decades of working in the Ministry of Home Affairs, Sachroni was moved to the State Ministry of State Apparatus Utilization in 2000 and become its secretary. After about three years, Sachroni became the Head of the National Archives. He held this position from 3 June 2003 until his retirement on 6 July 2004. During his brief tenure, Sachroni oversaw the digitalization of the national archives through a computerized archive administration system, nicknamed the SiPATI (Sistem Pengelolaan Arsip Berbasis Teknologi Informasi dan Komunikasi). The archiving system was later implemented in central government offices.

== Personal life ==
Sachroni is married to Kamarini Kamil and has a child.
