= Felix Siauw =

Chinese-Indonesian Islamic cleric

Felix Yanwar Siauw
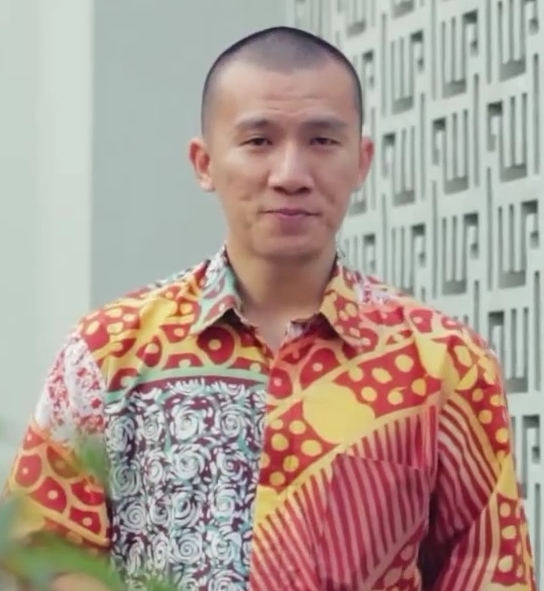
- Born: Felix Yanwar Siauw; January 31, 1984 (age 42); Palembang, South Sumatera, Indonesia
- Occupations: Author, Da'i
- Known for: Dawah

Felix Siauw
- Traditional Chinese: 蕭正國
- Simplified Chinese: 萧正国
Transcriptions
Standard Mandarin
- Hanyu Pinyin: Xiāo Zhèng Guó
- Wade–Giles: Hsiao Cheng Kuo
Yue: Cantonese
- Jyutping: Siu1 Zing3 Gwok3

Felix Yanwar Siauw (traditional Chinese: 蕭正國; simplified Chinese: 萧正国; pinyin: Xiāo Zhèng Guó, born January 31, 1984) is a Chinese-Indonesian Islamic cleric (ustad), preacher, author and da'i, known for his affiliation with the Islamist group Hizbut Tahrir Indonesia (HTI), and his hard-line puritanical position on Islamic interpretations.

Popular on social media, he’s known for his conservative positions, criticizing democracy, nationalism, capitalism, socialism, feminism and secularism.

== Early life ==
Siauw was born and grew up in a Catholic environment, however he became a lapsed Catholic before he converted to Islam. He started to recognize Islam in 2002, while still studying at the Bogor Agricultural University, and converted to Islam during his college days after meeting an activist of HTI. Siauw married in 2006 and currently has four children.

== Career ==
Siauw is a popular Islamic preacher with the combined followings on his Twitter and Instagram accounts over 3.2 million people. He is also an author whose works mostly raise the topics and perspectives associated with HTI. Perspectives of this group had been criticized several times for inaccurate depiction of history. In June 2017, he criticized the government decision to disband HTI as weakening Islam.

=== Controversy ===
In 2015, Siauw declared that selfie is a shameless and unpure act, which evoked widespread national condemnation. In May 2017, a university event planned for featuring Siauw in East Java was shut down by the police presence, acting on the calls by the mainstream Muslims and nationalists.

== Books ==
His books include:

- Muhammad al-Fatih, 1453, Kuala Lumpur : Alam Raya Enterprise, 2012, 318 p. On Mehmed the Conqueror.
- Beyond the inspiration, Jakarta : AlFatih Press, 2014, 267 p. On development of Islamic civilization.
- Yuk, berhijab!, Jakarta : AlFatih Press, 2015, 148 p. On hijab.
- Khilafah remake, Jakarta : AlFatih Press, 2015, 296 p. History and development of Islamic state.
- Udah putusin aja!, Jakarta : AlFatih Press, 2015, 180 p. On men—women relationships.
- Bersamamu, di jalan dakwah berliku, berbaris dalam dakwah, berpeluk dalam ukhuwah, Yogyakarta : Pro-U Media, 2016, 186 p. On Islamic dawah in Indonesia. Coauthored with Salim A. Fillah.
- Syar'i traveler : the heritage of Ottoman, Jakarta : AlFatih Press, 2019, 197 p. Account and his team traveling to Turkey.
- Antara dia, aku & mereka : sebelum permulaan, Jakarta : AlFatih Press, 2019, 227 p. On reflection of life and words of wisdom with reference to Islamic perspectives.
