= Poedjono Pranyoto =

Indonesian military officer and politician (1936–2021)

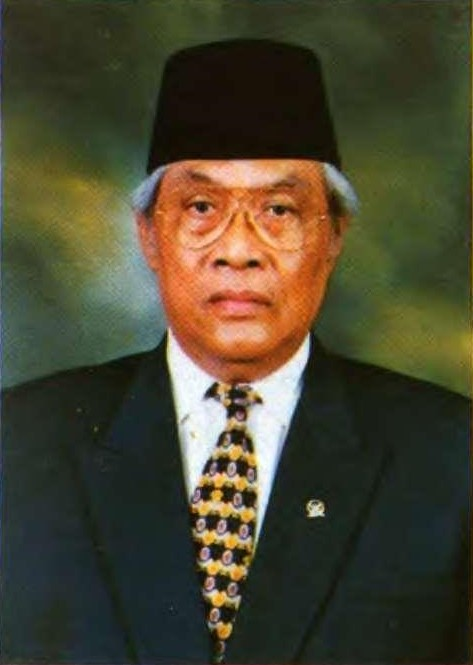

Deputy Speaker of the People's Consultative Assembly (Regional Delegates)
- In office 3 October 1997 – 1 October 1999
- President: Suharto; B. J. Habibie
- Preceded by: Ahmad Amiruddin
- Succeeded by: Oesman Sapta Odang

Governor of Lampung
- In office 11 May 1988 – 3 October 1997
- President: Suharto
- Lieutenant: Subki E. Harun (1988–1990); Man Hasan (1990–1995); Suwardi Ramli (1994–1997); Oemarsono (1995–1997)
- Preceded by: Yasir Hadibroto
- Succeeded by: Oman Sachroni (acting); Oemarsono

Vice Governor of Irian Jaya
- In office 27 August 1987 – 11 May 1988
- Governor: Izaac Hindom; Barnabas Suebu
- Preceded by: Sugiyono
- Succeeded by: Soedardjat Nataatmadja

Regent of Cilacap
- In office November 1979 – 27 August 1987
- Governor: Soepardjo Rustam; Muhammad Ismail
- Preceded by: RYK. Moekmin
- Succeeded by: Mohamad Supardi

Personal details
- Born: 6 August 1936 Purwokerto, Dutch East Indies
- Died: 2 December 2021 (aged 85) Jakarta, Indonesia

Military service
- Allegiance: Indonesia
- Branch/service: Indonesian Army
- Years of service: 1961–1991
- Rank: Lieutenant general (honorary)
- Commands: Cilacap Military District

Poedjono Pranyoto (6 August 1936 – 2 December 2021) was an Indonesian military officer and politician who served as the governor of Lampung from 1988 until 1997 and the deputy speaker of the People's Consultative Assembly from 1997 until 1999.

== Early life ==
Poedjono was born on 6 August 1936 in Purwokerto, Dutch East Indies. He was the sixth child of Ahmad Wignjo Pranyoto and Umi Khalsum. His father worked as a post office clerk.

As a child, Poedjono started his education at the Sampoerna Elementary School and finished in 1952. He then continued his education to the Purwokerto Junior High School and graduated in 1955.

== Military career ==
After graduating from the Purwokerto Senior High School in 1958, Poedjono entered the Military Engineers Academy. He finished his education in 1961 and became a first lieutenant. His first assignment was as an instructor at the Army Engineers Academy. Afterwards, he was rotated to various posts in combat engineers battalion.

He reached the rank of lieutenant colonel after being appointed the commander of the 4th Combat Engineers' Battalion in Central Java. He was reposted after three years serving as a battalion commander and became the commander of the Cilacap Military District for about two years.

Poedjono ended military service after the Cilacap municipal council elected him as the regent of Cilacap in 1979. However, he would not retire from the military until twelve years later on 11 November 1991. A presidential decree enacted six years after his retirement promoted him to the honorary rank of lieutenant general on 1 September 1997.

== Political career ==
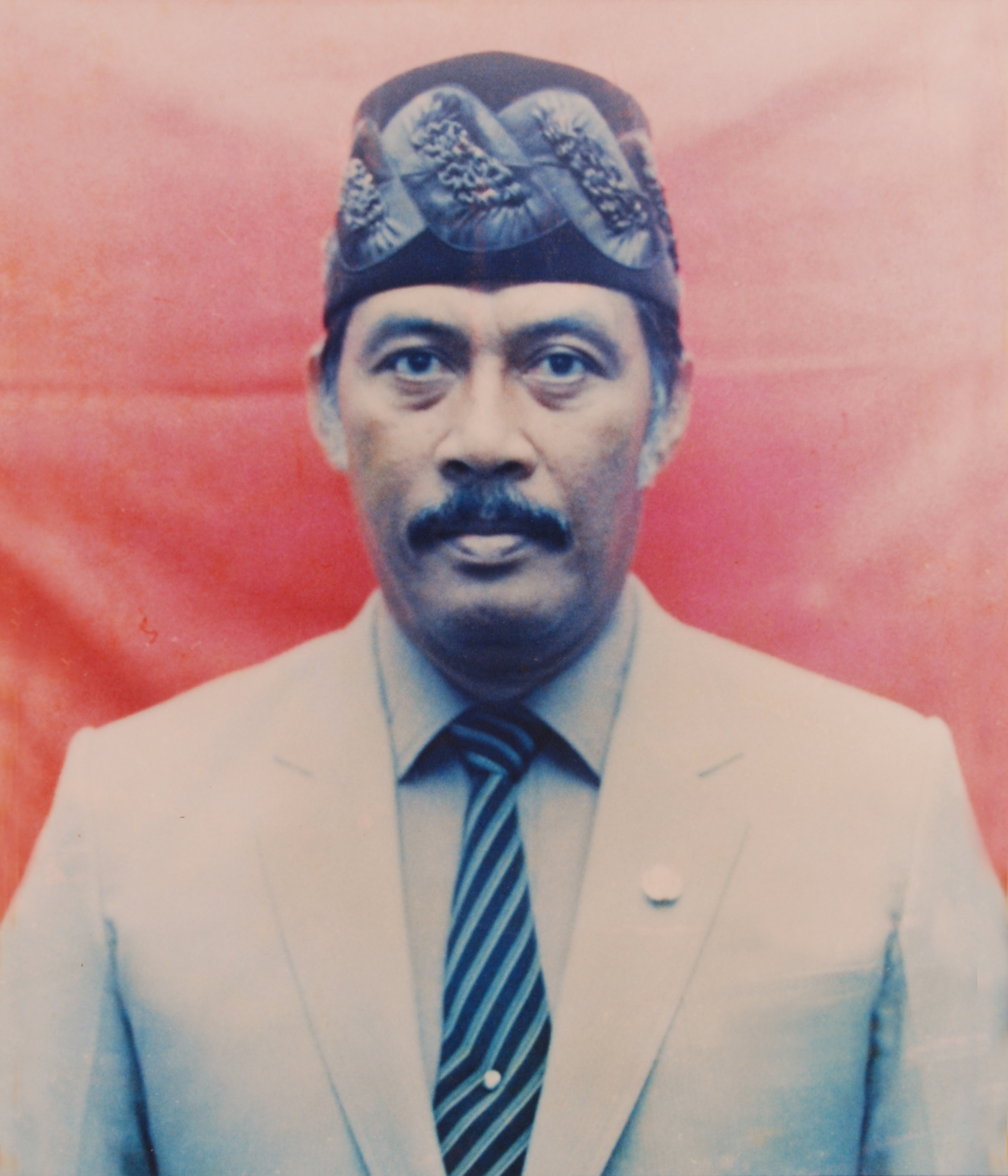
Poedjono as the regent of Cilacap

During his tenure as the regent of Cilacap, Poedjono revived the Sedekah Laut (Sea Thanksgiving) tradition in 1982, an ancient annual tradition which dates back to 1817 and involves washing away various offerings to the sea.

Poedjono was re-elected and installed for a second term as regent on 19 November 1984. At the end of his second term, in July 1987, around 200 Cilacap fishermen committed strike action to protest against bottom trawling. The strike ended after Poedjono promised to ban the practice.

After about eight years serving as a regent, Poedjono was appointed the vice governor of Irian Jaya (now Papua), replacing Sugiyono who was removed amid rumours of bitter conflict between him and the governor, Izaac Hindom. He held this post for a brief period, as in early 1988 he was already nominated by the government as a candidate for the governor of Lampung. The council approved his nomination and he was installed as governor of Lampung on 11 May 1988. He was reelected as governor on 12 April 1993 and was installed for a second term on 11 May 1993.

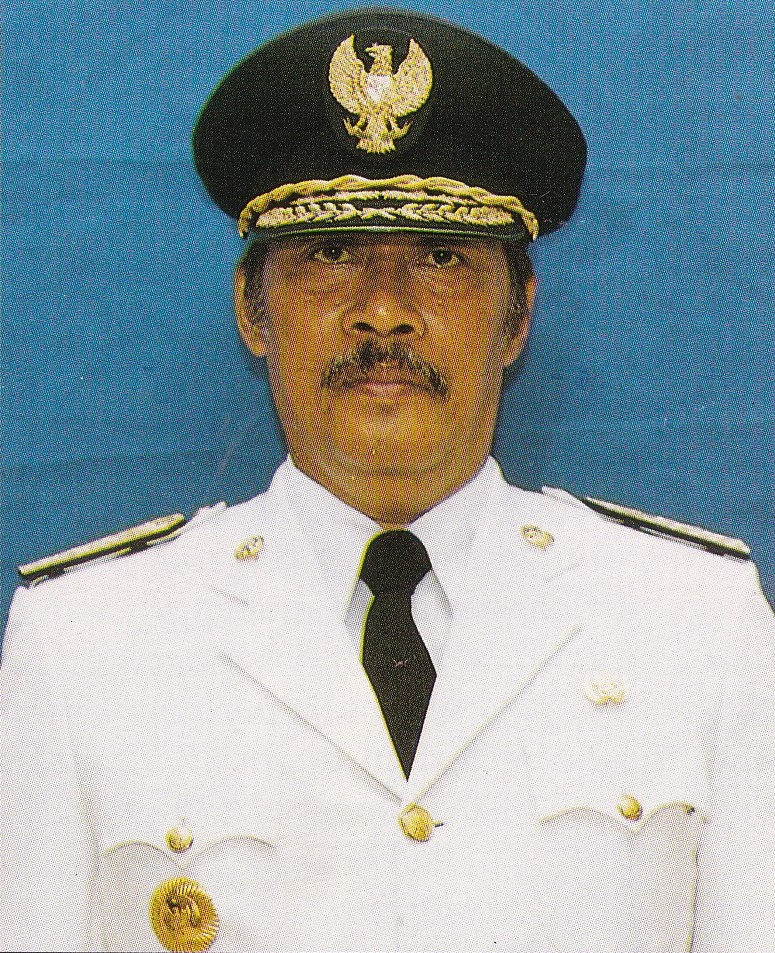
Poedjono Pranyoto as the Governor of Lampung.

At the start of his term as governor, Poedjono introduced sumbay, or the five principles of the Lampung society. Sumbay was later compressed down to a motto titled Gerbang Sakai Sambayan, which means the spirit of cooperation. According to news reporter Heri Wardoyo, Poedjono based his policies on the sumbay principles.

In 1989, the Lampung government forced transmigrants in Rawa Jitu, North Lampung, to move because their settlements lie in an area which was recently accorded the 'protected forest' status. However, only 575 out of 2,376 families in the area agreed to move. In a brutal attempt to evict those who refused to move, Poedjono instructed local officials to burn down the transmigrant houses. Around a thousand houses were burned down as a result of his instruction. Poedjono later defended his actions, stating that "it would be more inhumane to allow the villagers to remain in the forest as their occupation of the land was causing floods downstream."

Poedjono's second term was cut short by a year, as on 3 October 1997 he was elected as the deputy speaker of the People's Consultative Assembly. He oversaw the seventh reelection of President Suharto in March 1998, as well as his resignation two months later. A new parliament was formed following the 1999 legislative election and Poedjono resigned from the People's Consultative Assembly in 1999.

== Later life and death ==
After his retirement from politics, Poedjono lived at his house in Cilandak, South Jakarta. He died on 2 December 2021. He was buried at the Jeruk Purut Cemetery.

== Personal life ==
Poedjono was married to Sri Mulyati Wahyuningsih. The couple has three children.
