= Oemarsono =

Indonesian politician (1940–2022)

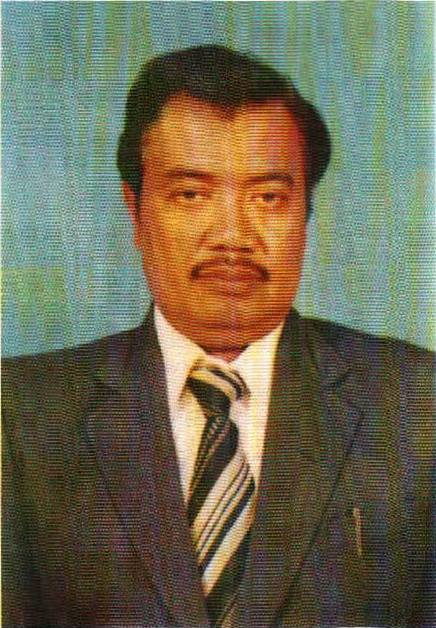

Governor of Lampung
- In office 26 January 1998 – 27 January 2003
- President: Suharto; B. J. Habibie; Abdurrahman Wahid; Megawati Sukarnoputri
- Lieutenant: Suwardi Ramli
- Preceded by: Poedjono Pranyoto; Oman Sachroni (acting)
- Succeeded by: Tursandi Alwi (acting); Sjachroedin Zainal Pagaralam

Vice Governor of Lampung
- In office 18 December 1995 – 26 January 1998 Serving with Suwardi Ramli
- Governor: Poedjono Pranyoto; Oman Sachroni (acting)
- Preceded by: Man Hasan
- Succeeded by: Syamsurya Ryacudu

Regent of Wonogiri
- In office 1985–1995
- Governor: Muhammad Ismail; Suwardi Prawiranegara
- Preceded by: Soediharto
- Succeeded by: Tjuk Susilo

Personal details
- Born: 3 May 1940 Sragen, Dutch East Indies
- Died: 22 May 2022 (aged 82) Surakarta, Central Java, Indonesia
- Party: Indonesian Democratic Party of Struggle

Kanjeng Raden Tumenggung Oemarsono (3 May 1940 – 22 May 2022) was an Indonesian civil servant and politician who was the Governor of Lampung from 1998 to 2003. Previously, he was the province's vice governor from 1995 to 1998.

== Early life ==
Oemarsono was born to Sastro Prawiro and R. Ng. Siti Maryamin on 3 May 1940 in Sragen, Central Java, where he attended and graduated from elementary school and junior high school in 1954 and 1957, respectively. Afterwards, he moved to Surakarta, and attended a state high school until he graduated in 1960. He then entered the Gadjah Mada University in Yogyakarta, where he earned an undergraduate degree in social and political sciences in 1966.

== Regent of Wonogiri ==
Oemarsono entered civil service in 1966 and started to work at the Sragen regional government. He became the Head of the Revenue Services of Sragen in 1985. Several months later, the Wonogiri local council elected him as the Regent of Wonogiri. He was reelected for a second term in 1990.

Before Oemarsono became regent, the Wonogiri region was the poorest in Central Java. During Oemarsono's first years, the region experienced a significant increase in per capita income. He also obtained a 690 million rupiah loan from the central government to construct a drinking water system and a $23 million loan from the World Bank for the re-greening of a catchment area near the Gajahmungkur Reservoir.

Oemarsono launched a food diversification program which encouraged the local populace to abandon bread in favor of cassava. He pushed for the cultivation of rice substitutes in the region such as beans, sweet potato, and corn. He also established a nucleus estate and smallholder farm system for cassava in the region, and received assistance from the central government in the form of kernels for corn plantations.

Oemarsono was nominated by the provincial council of Central Java for the post of vice governor after the death of the previous officeholder, Sujamto, in 1994. This was rejected by the Minister of Home Affairs due to problems regarding bureaucratic seniority.

Oemarsono's work in the region did not go unnoticed by the central government, and in 1989 the regency received the Parasamya Purnakarya Nugraha, an award given by the president to the best-performed regions in Indonesia during the first five-year plan. Earlier in July 1987, the monarch of Mangkunegaran granted him the royal title of Kanjeng Raden Tumenggung. As with other regents who received awards from the president during that time, Oemarsono would go on to become governor. Oemarsono ended his second term in 1995, and Tjuk Susilo replaced him.

== Vice Governor and Governor of Lampung ==
Oemarsono was installed as the Vice Governor of Lampung for economic affairs on 18 December 1995 under Poedjono Pranyoto. About a year later, Poedjono became the Deputy Speaker of the People's Consultative Assembly, and resigned as governor. Oman Sachroni, the director general for general government and autonomy in the Ministry of Home Affairs, was chosen to temporarily replace Pranyoto and to hold an election for a new governor. Oemarsono won the election by 35 to 43 votes and he was installed to replace Sachroni on 26 January 1998. Despite the apparent initial support for Oemarsono's leadership in the region, his Javanese ethnicity angered a lot of indigenous Lampung residents and led to months of anti-Javanese protests.

Less than a year later, the President of Indonesia Suharto fell from power. A day before, a large group of students had occupied the Lampung Provincial Council office and forced Oemarsono to sign a demand for Suharto's resignation. Afterwards, there were waves of demands for Oemarsono to resign. The Lampung Student's Consortium regarded Oemarsono as a remnant of Suharto's cronyism and demanded the Indonesian Democratic Party of Struggle (PDI-P), the winner of the post-Suharto election, deny the recommendation for Oemarsono's reelection. Around the same time, a large protest with similar demands occurred, and Oemarsono had to deploy a paramilitary organization to disperse the demonstration.

Under Oemarsono's leadership, Lampung's provincial budget turned from a deficit into a surplus, mostly due to his policy of tightening budget spending. He enacted the People's Tapioca Flour Industry to increase the income of farmers. Oemarsono also enacted programs such as Return to Village Movement and Desaku Maju Sakai Sambayan (DMSS), which encouraged civil servants to serve in villages. Most of these programs were controversial. The People's Tapioca Flour Industry had no clear business vision and management, and the Desaku Maju Sakai Sambayan program was widely regarded as an extortion.

Near the end of his term, Oemarsono sought reelection. Despite calls not to provide recommendation for Oemarsono, the PDI-P did so. Oemarsono also received support from ethnic minority groups in the province, such as the Bantenese people. A group of local PDI-P functionaries under the leadership of Abbas Hadisunyoto nominated Alzier Dianis Thabranie, a local party chairman, as an alternative candidate. The central council of the party expelled members of the group from the Indonesian Democratic Party of Struggle. Thabranie later won the election against Oemarsono by 39 to 33 votes, but he was arrested the day after and the election results were annulled. Hari Sabarno, the minister of home affairs, took over the local government from Oemarsono on 27 January 2003.

== Later life ==
After retiring from the government, Oemarsono settled in Lampung and started a hotel business. He unsuccessfully ran for reelection in 2004 and 2009, receiving only a minuscule share of votes each time. Oemarsono died at the Dr. Muwardi Hospital in Surakarta at noon on 22 May 2022 and was buried at his family's cemetery in Sragen.
