= Manglé =

Indonesian culture magazine

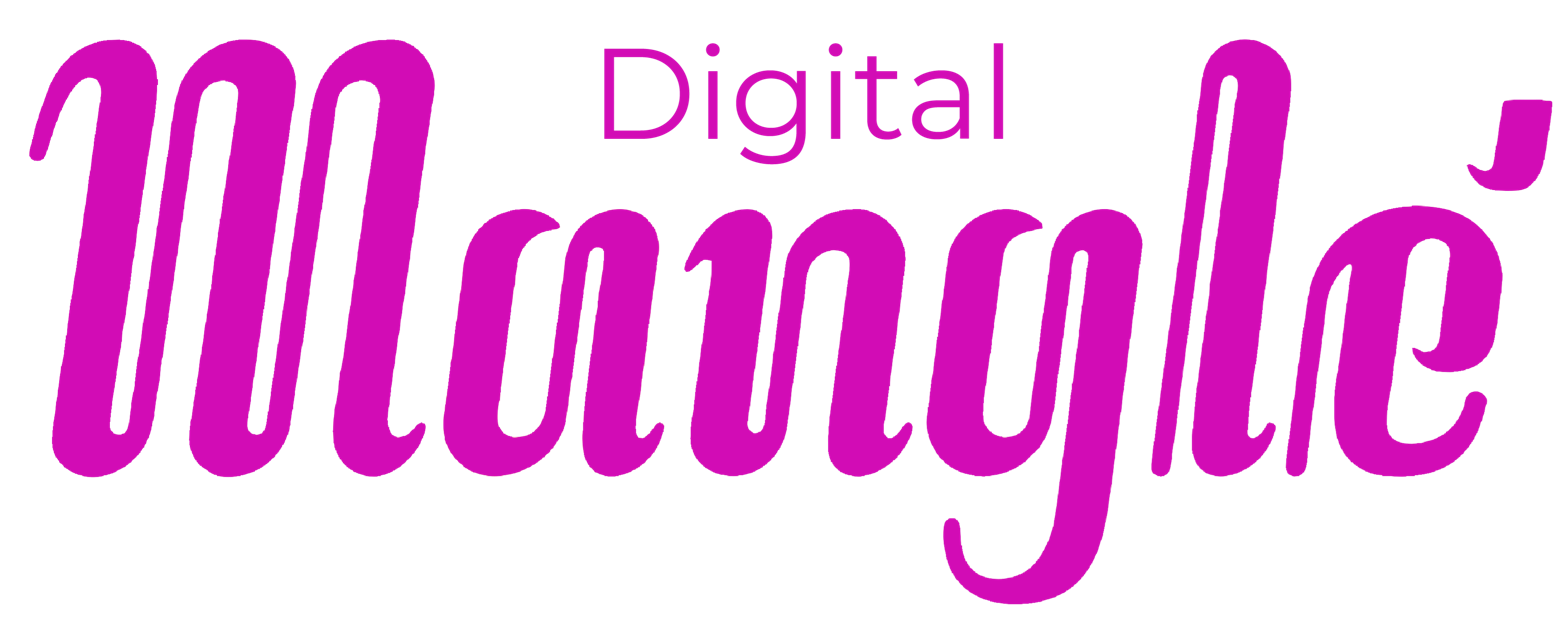
- Categories: Culture
- Frequency: Monthly (1957-1965); Weekly (1965-present)
- Founder: Oeton Moechtar, Rochamina Sudarmika, Wahyu Wibisana, Saleh Danasasmita, and Sukanda Kartasasmita
- First issue: 21 October 1957
- Company: PT Manglé Panglipur
- Country: Indonesia
- Based in: Bandung
- Language: Sundanese
- Website: mangle.id
- ISSN: 0852-8217

Manglé was a Sundanese language Indonesian culture magazine. It had semi monthly publication.

== History ==
Oeton Moechtar, Rochamina Sudarmika, Wahyu Wibisana, Saleh Danasasmita, and Sukanda Kartasasmita founded Mangle on 21 October 1957.

The majority of readers the magazine are residents in West Java due to being published in the Sundanese language.
