= Muhanto A. Q. =

Indonesian civil servant and politician (1953–2019)

Director General of National Unity and Politics
- In office 14 February 2001 – 12 May 2005
- President: Megawati Sukarnoputri; Susilo Bambang Yudhoyono
- Preceded by: Ermaya Suradinata
- Succeeded by: Soedarsono Hardjosoekarto

Personal details
- Born: July 10, 1953 Kudus, Central Java, Indonesia
- Died: October 13, 2019 (aged 66) Jakarta, Indonesia
- Education: Gadjah Mada University; Jakarta School of Economics; Jakarta State University

Muhanto A. Q. (10 July 1953 – 13 September 2019) was an Indonesian bureaucrat and politician from the Crescent Star Party. He served as the Director General of National Unity and Politics from 2001 to 2005.

== Early life and education ==
Muhanto was born in Kudus, Indonesia on July 10, 1953. He received his early education at the Gondang Manis Elementary School in Kudus before continuning to Barongan State Economy Middle School in Kudus and 2nd Yogyakarta State Senior High School. He then earned his undergraduate degree from the Gadjah Mada University in Yogyakarta. He continued his education, obtaining a master's degree in management from the Jakarta School of Economics and a doctorate from the Jakarta State University.

== Bureaucratic career ==
Muhanto's government career began in 1980 when he joined the department for relations with higher state institutions in the state secretariat. During his tenure, he was assigned to various groups inside the secretariat, including to the presidential group of advisors for ideology, the secretariat for the ideological training improvement in the field of national awareness, and the constitution translation team. By 1998, he was promoted to the deputy assistant minister of state secretary for territorial affairs. After serving for two years, he was appointed as the head of NGO relations bureau inside the state secretariat.

After serving in the state secretariat for 21 years, on 14 February 2001 Muhanto was appointed as the Director General of National Unity Development, replacing Ermaya Suradinata who served as the Governor of the National Resilience Institute. Muhanto's post underwent a name change in 2002 to the Director General of National Unity, and in 2004 to the Director General of National Unity and Politics. He was replaced by Soedarsono Hardjosoekarto on 12 May 2005. He retired from the civil service since then.

== Political career ==
Muhanto ran as a candidate for the House of Representatives in 2014 and 2019 from the Crescent Star Party, representing the Central Java II electoral district. He became the chair of the party's public relations and institutional department chairman in 2015 before being appointed as the party's deputy chairman for electoral affairs in 2017. He died on 13 September 2019 at the Fatmawati Hospital in Jakarta and was interred at a Muslim public cemetery at the Pondok Safari Indah housing complex in Pondok Aren, South Tangerang, Banten.
