= Izaac Hindom =

Indonesian bureaucrat and politician (1934–2009)

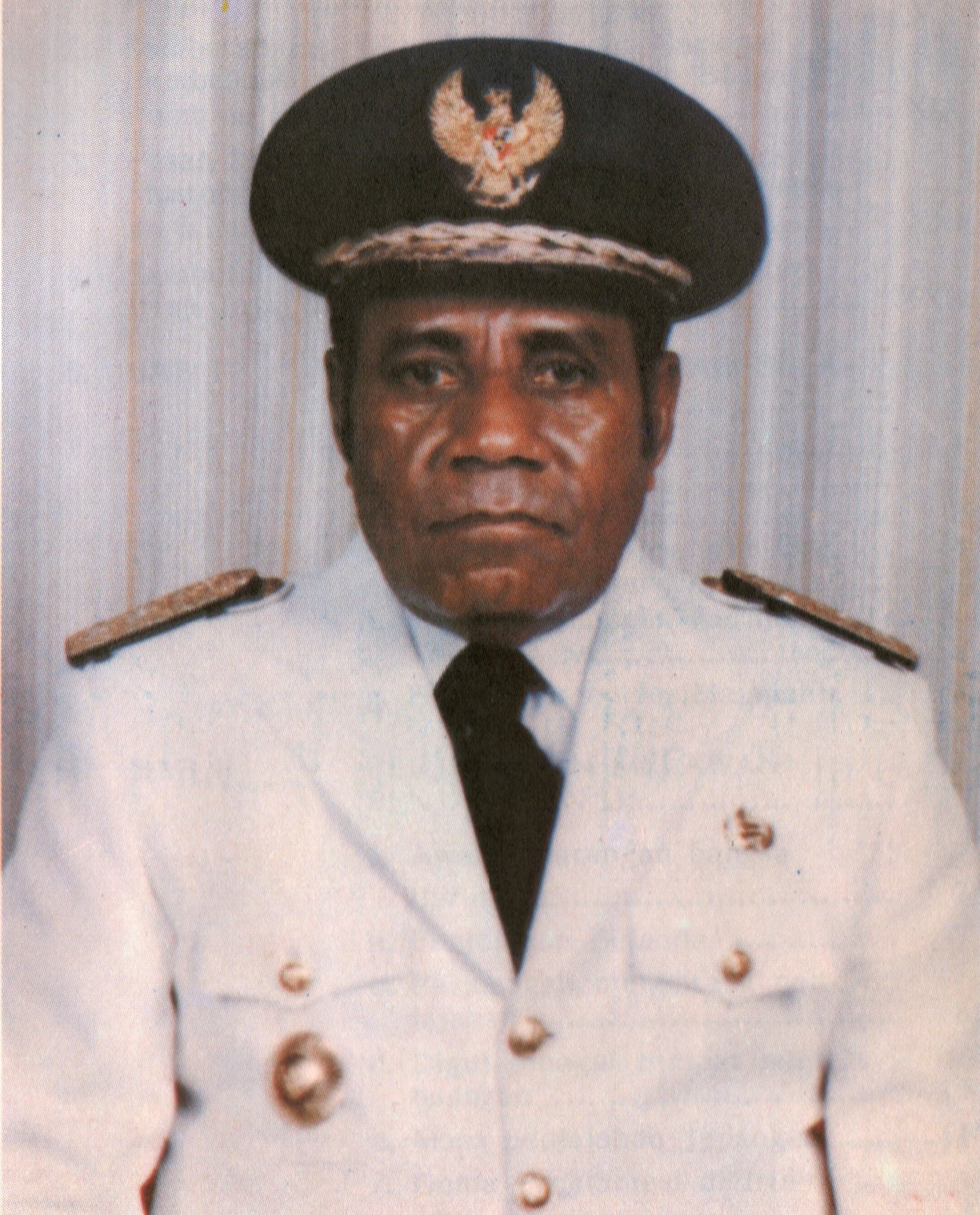
- Hindom in 1986

Member of the Supreme Advisory Council
- In office 6 August 1988 – 31 July 2003
- President: Suharto; B. J. Habibie; Abdurrahman Wahid; Megawati Sukarnoputri

8th Governor of Irian Jaya
- In office 4 August 1982 – 13 April 1988
- President: Suharto
- Deputy: Sugiyono; Poedjono Pranyoto
- Preceded by: Busiri Suryowinoto
- Succeeded by: Barnabas Suebu

Vice Governor of Irian Jaya
- In office 22 November 1980 – 4 August 1982
- Governor: Soetran; Busiri Suryowinoto
- Preceded by: Jan Mamoribo; Elias Paprindey (acting)
- Succeeded by: Sugiyono

Member of the People's Representative Council
- In office 28 October 1971 – 22 November 1980
- President: Suharto
- Constituency: Irian Jaya

Personal details
- Born: 23 December 1934 Adora, Fak-Fak, Dutch East Indies
- Died: 11 March 2009 (aged 74) Dok II Jayapura Hospital, Jayapura, Papua, Indonesia
- Party: Golkar

Izaac Hindom (23 December 1934 – 11 March 2009) was an Indonesian bureaucrat and politician who served as the governor of Irian Jaya (now Papua) from 1982 until 1988.

Born in Fak-Fak, Hindom began his education at a Dutch school for native Papuans and ended it in a school for Papuan civil servants. Hindom worked at various civil servant posts during the Netherlands New Guinea era and unsuccessfully ran for a seat in the New Guinea Council. After Indonesia annexed Netherlands New Guinea, Hindom was appointed as a member of the Daily Governance Body in 1965. He was twice elected as a member of the People's Representative Council in 1971 and 1977. He ended short his second term in the council after being appointed as vice governor on 22 November 1980 and became governor two years later on 4 August 1982 after his predecessor's death.

During his tenure, he planned a massive transmigration program, which would resettle more than half a million transmigrants to the province. His transmigration program was criticized by various parties, ranging from the transmigrants themselves to Western environmentalists and human rights groups. He also oversaw the division of the province into three semi-official regions, the exploitation of the province's forests, and launched a campaign to abolish koteka.

After his first term ended, he ran in the next gubernatorial election, but withdrew several weeks after the election commenced. He was then appointed as a member of the Supreme Advisory Council in 1988, an office he held until 2003. He died six years later on 11 March 2009.

== Early life ==
Hindom was born on 23 December 1934 in Adora Village, a village located in the Fak-Fak Afdeling (regency). Hindom began his education at the Hollandsch-Inlandsche School, Dutch school for native Papuans, and graduated from the school in 1949. He then continued his education at the Algemene Lagere School and the Opleidingschool voor Inheemse Bestuur Ambtenaren (OSIBA), a school for Papuan civil servants. He graduated from the school in 1954.

== Civil servant in Netherlands New Guinea ==
Following his graduation from OSIBA, Hindom served as civil servants in various places in Netherlands New Guinea. Hindom was first employed by the Sub-Division Administrative Head of Fakfak. He was employed for about a year until he was appointed as the Head of the Etna Bay District in 1955. He was transferred to Kaimana and was employed to the Sub-Division Administrative Head of Fakfak in December 1957. Less than a year later, in March 1958, he returned to and was employed again by the Sub-Division Administrative Head of Fakfak until 1959. From February 1960 until September 1962, he served as the Head of the Arguni Bay District.

During the 1961 Dutch New Guinea general election, Hindom ran as a candidate for the New Guinea Council from the Kaimana constituency. He ran against Nicholas Tanggama and Mohammad Achmad, but lost to the latter.

== Political career ==
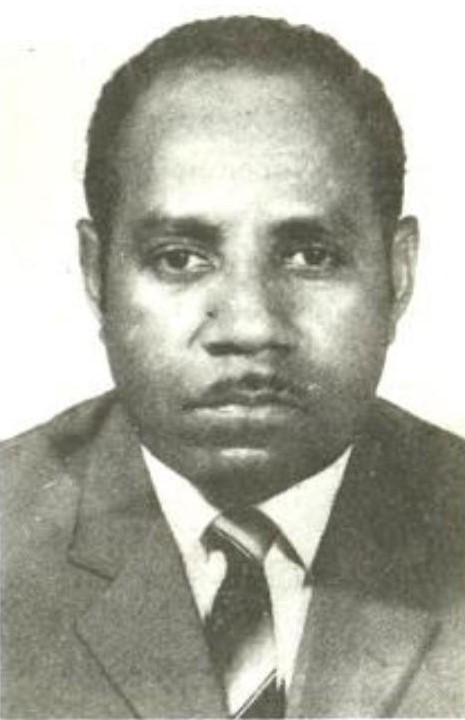
Member of People's Representative Council Izaac Hindom in 1971.

According to his official parliamentary biography, Hindom assisted the Indonesians indirectly during Operation Trikora. For his support to Indonesia's cause, Hindom was appointed the Regional District Head of Teminabuan in June 1963. He was promoted in July 1965 to serve as a member of the Daily Governance Body, a governmental body made to assist the governor. Hindom resided in Jakarta during his tenure as a member of the Daily Governance Body.

Hindom was nominated as the candidate for the People's Representative Council from the Fakfak constituency. The local council of Irian Jaya elected him as an MP from the Fakfak constituency with 15 votes. He was inaugurated as an MP on 28 October 1971 and subsequently resigned from his Daily Governance Body membership. He was elected for a second term as an MP from the Jayapura constituency in the 1977 Indonesian legislative election and was inaugurated on 1 October 1977. According to political researcher Alexander Griapon, Hindom maintained a good relationship with Indonesian central government officials and Papuan indigenous officials during his term as a member of the Daily Governance Body and the People's Representative Council.

== Vice Governor of Irian Jaya ==
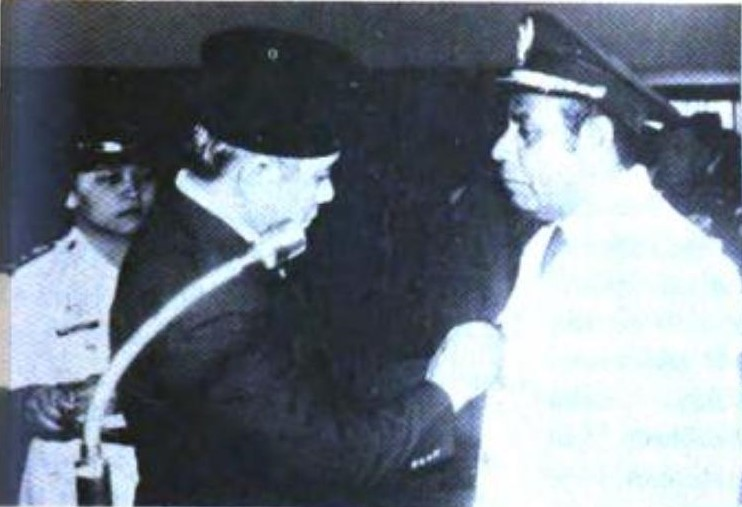

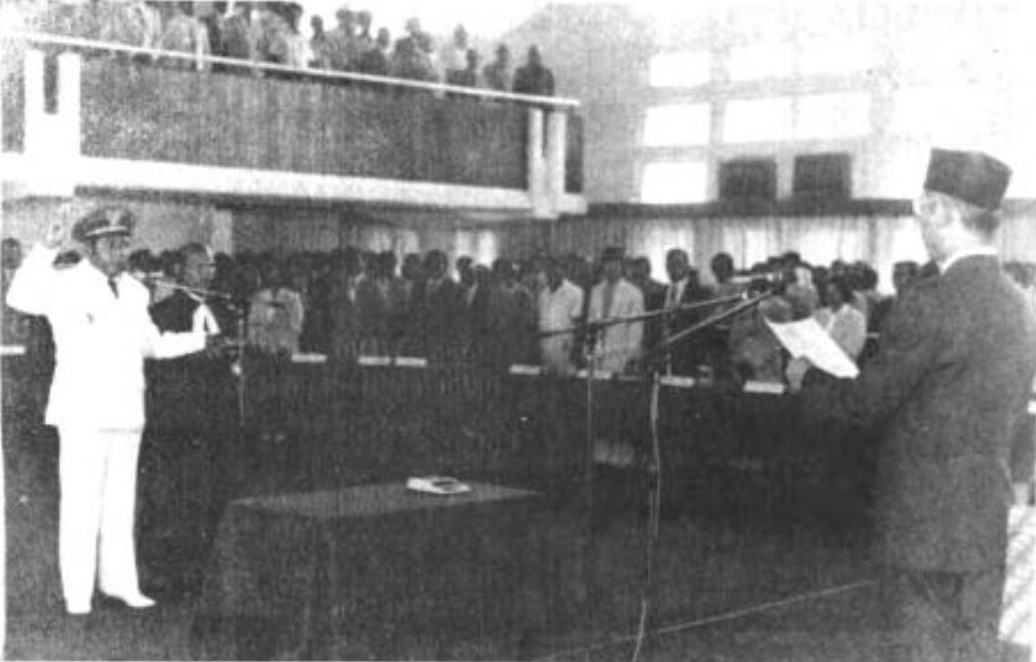
Inauguration of Izaac Hindom as the Vice Governor (top) and Governor (bottom) of Irian Jaya.

Hindom was appointed the Vice Governor of Irian Jaya on 22 November 1980 by Governor Soetran, replacing Elias Paprindey who had assumed office as acting vice governor for more than three years. Hindom's appointment as Vice Governor disappointed certain indigenous Papuan groups who believed that indigenous Papuans should be appointed governor instead of vice governor. However, Hindom's Fakfak origin gained him support from the local elites of South Papua.

== Governor of Irian Jaya ==
=== Succession ===
On 3 August 1982, Busiri Suryowinoto, the Governor of Irian Jaya, went to Japan to undergo an operation for his cholelithiasis. However, Busiri died on his way from the Narita Airport to the Jutendo Hospital the day after. Hindom, as the most powerful person in Irian Jaya after Busiri's departure, automatically assumed office as the acting Governor of Irian Jaya following Busiri's death.

A gubernatorial election was held several months later to elect a definitive governor. The election, which was held on 16 October 1982, saw Hindom winning with 29 out of 39 votes cast. Hindom was sworn in as the governor by ad interim Minister of Internal Affairs Sudharmono on 12 November 1982.

=== Transmigration policies ===
Through the transmigration program, the communities of Irian Jaya who are still isolated may be able to get in touch with their brothers and sisters from other provinces outside their area and living environment. Through this program, the difficulties which have become the barriers so far may be suppressed, minimized, or eliminated.

— Izaac Hindom, 24 December 1986

Hindom was a keen supporter of the transmigration program. Under his rule, the central government shifted the transmigration focus from Sumatra to Papua. Hindom believed that transmigration would break the isolation of remote tribes and provide technology, education, and electricity to remote tribes in Irian Jaya. In an interview, Hindom planned to resettle 700,000 transmigrants at the end of his term, far more compared to the 58,000 transmigrants resettled prior to Hindom's term. The resettlement program was organized by the local and central governments, although sometimes it involved companies operating in the region.

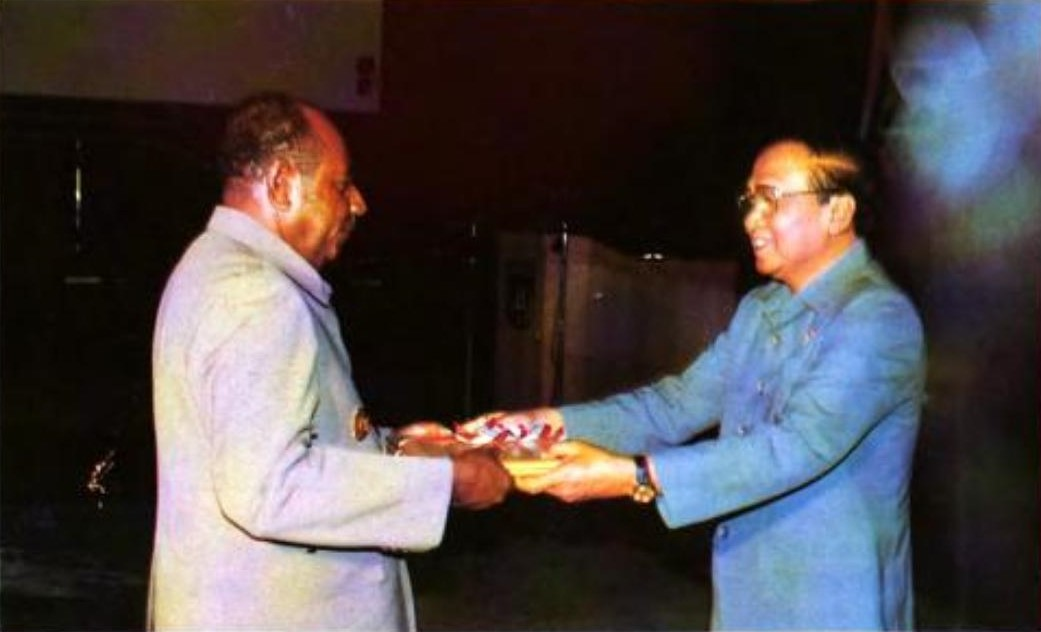
Minister of Defence Poniman handing over the list of the five-year development projects in Irian Jaya to Governor Izaac Hindom.

To optimize the transmigration program, Hindom divided the province into four development regions. Each region was centered in a city. The first region was centered in Jayapura, the second was centered in Biak, the third was centered in Sorong, and the fourth was centered in Merauke. The government claimed that the formation of the development regions managed to alleviate isolation from remote places and helped to build new villages and transport hubs.

Hindom, a Papuan himself, viewed the transmigrants (mostly Javanese) as more superior physically and morally compared to the ethnic Papuans, whom he described as backward and self-centered. Hindom actively promoted the assimilation between Papuans and Javanese, and stated that a mixed marriage between Papuans and Javanese will give birth to a mixed race and "sowing the seeds for greater beauty". Hindom also did not share the fear that the Muslim-majority Javanese would convert the Christian-majority Papuans to Islam, and stated it as "God's will" if it ever happened. He predicted in 1984 that in fifty years, the natives of the region would look similar to the Javanese.

The implementation of the program was criticized by the transmigrants. Complaints from transmigrants focused on practical difficulties, such as bad site selection, inadequate land preparation, poor water supply, lack of good roads and transport, and pests.

The first governor of Irian Jaya, Eliezer Jan Bonay expressed his disapproval of Hindom's transmigration policy. He stated that the transmigrants were forcing their religion on Papuans and that transmigration caused Papuans to have only very low and clerical jobs. Similar criticism was delivered by Western environmentalists and human rights groups, which requested the World Bank to halt the funding for the transmigration program. Tapol, a non-governmental organisation which monitored human rights issues in Indonesia, described Hindom as "the mouthpiece of the Indonesian colonial government in Jakarta" and as "wanting to hasten the process of obliterating the Melanesian people and culture" through his transmigration programs.

Aside from disapproval by NGOs, the transmigration policy was also criticized by Indonesian officials. The commander of the Irian Jaya Military Region during Hindom's term, Raja Kami Sembiring Meliala, pointed out that the effects of the program might "prove counter-productive" and advised the government to "drastically revise the program" because it made the Papuans "...feel like strangers in their own land".

=== Splitting the province of Irian Jaya ===
Under Busiri Suryowinoto, Hindom's predecessor, the proposal to split the province of Irian Jaya had been widely discussed amongst Papuan bureaucrats. As a vice governor, Hindom was asked by Busiri to assist him in formulating the proposal. After Busiri's death, Hindom continued the discourse about the proposal. The proposal was delivered to Suharto in 1982 and was approved in July 1983. The proposal resulted in a division of the province into three semi-official region on 11 January 1984. Each semi-official region was headed by an assistant governor. The assistant governors was given the task of preparing the transformation of the semi-official regions into provinces.

=== Forestry ===
During his term, Hindom promoted exploitation of Papua's forest resources. Hindom's promotion attracted companies such as Hanurata company, which was owned by Probosutedjo, brother of President Suharto. Hanurata received concessions from the local government to exploit Irian Jaya's forest resources, but the company did not support local populations as most of the workers were brought from outside the province.

=== Anti-koteka campaign ===
Hindom continued the anti-koteka campaign, which had begun since the Acub Zainal administration in 1973. The campaign was part of an attempt to gradually abolish koteka in the region.

=== Re-election and withdrawal ===
In accordance to the law, Hindom's term as the governor of Irian Jaya would end on 12 November 1987. Thus, the Regional People's Representative Council of Irian Jaya — the region's parliament — prepared a parliamentary election to elect a new governor. Three candidates ran in the election. The first candidate was Hindom himself, while the second and third candidates were S.H. Gultom, Hindom's assistant, and S. Samiyana, a Javanese bureaucrat who worked in Irian Jaya.

Hindom's nomination sparked protests from various groups in Irian Jaya. On 2 September 1987, the eight major tribal chiefs of Papua delivered a letter to President Suharto which demanded Hindom to resign. The protests continued up until the elections on 26 September when a group of students from the Cenderawasih University went to the office of the Regional People's Representative Council and protested against Hindom. Hindom later won the election with 35 votes, while his opponent Gultom and Samiyana only obtained six and four votes each.

However, on 12 October, Hindom stated his withdrawal from the elections, citing polygamy — which violates Government Regulation No. 10 of 1983 — as his main reason. Hindom later met with the Minister of Internal Affairs Soepardjo Roestam to elaborate on his withdrawal. Soepardjo explained that Hindom cited his inability to cope with the burden of governorship and the succession of the governorship by a younger generation as his other reasons. After his withdrawal, Gultom and Samiyana also withdrew, thus annulling the results of the election.

The second election which was intended to replace the results of the first elections could not be held before Hindom's term expired. Thus, on 18 November 1987, Soepardjo inaugurated Hindom for an extension of his term. A second election was done on 13 February 1988. Barnabas Suebu, the Speaker of the Regional People's Representative Council of Irian Jaya, won the election with 35 votes. Hindom handed over his office to Suebu on 13 April 1988.

== Member of the Supreme Advisory Council ==
Following his resignation as the Governor of Irian Jaya, Hindom was appointed a member of the Supreme Advisory Council, a council for advising the president on national matters, for the 1988—1993 term. He was inaugurated on 6 August 1988. He was subsequently appointed for two more terms in 1993 and 1998 until the council was disbanded on 31 July 2003. Overall, Hindom served as an advisor to four different presidents for almost 15 years. (Note: Between 6 August 1988 until 31 July 2003, exact duration 14 years, 11 months, and 25 days.)

During his last term in the council, Hindom served in the political commission of the council. Hindom supported full regional autonomy for Papua, but he refused to support the Free Papua Movement in their independence movement for Papua. In relation to Papuan matters, Hindom requested the delay of the implementation of regional autonomy in Papua, and requested the Indonesian government to free Theys Eluay, a West Papuan independence activist.

Hindom was appointed a member of the board commissioners of the Freeport-McMoRan company in mid-1999. According to Gabrielle Kirk McDonald, Hindom was appointed to represent the interests of indigenous Papuans in the company.

== Death ==
Hindom died due to a pulmonary embolism at 9.30 UTC+9 on 11 March 2009 in Dok II Provincial Hospital Jayapura. Previously, Hindom was treated for his pulmonary embolism since January 2009 at the Arjoko Army Hospital in Jayapura.

The former rector of the Cenderawasih University, August Kafiar, and Ambassador of Indonesia to Colombia, Michael Manufandu delivered their condolences for Hindom.
