= Busiri Suryowinoto =

Indonesian military officer and politician

Major General Busiri Suryowinoto
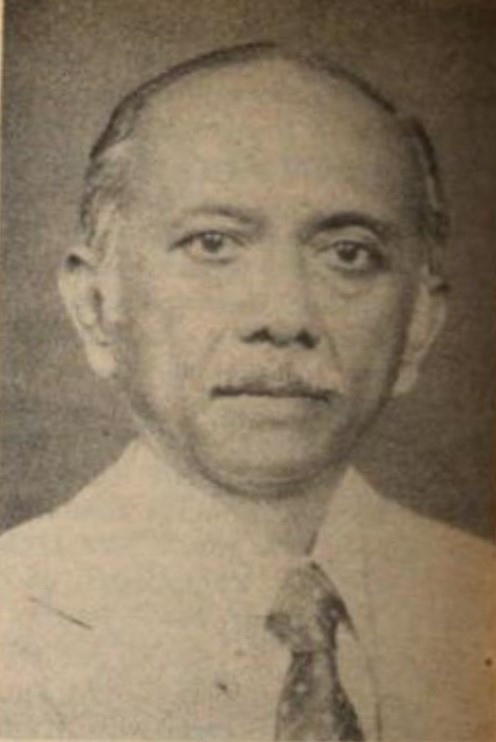

Governor of Irian Jaya
- In office 20 January 1981 – 4 August 1982
- President: Suharto
- Deputy: Izaac Hindom
- Preceded by: Soetran
- Succeeded by: Izaac Hindom

Indonesian Ambassador to Papua New Guinea
- In office 14 December 1977 – 11 April 1981
- Preceded by: Rudjito
- Succeeded by: Abdul Aziz Bustam

Personal details
- Born: 24 November 1926 Batu Marmar, Pamekasan, Madura
- Died: 4 August 1982 (aged 55) Tokyo, Japan
- Party: Golkar
- Spouse: Enny Achyani

Military service
- Allegiance: Indonesia
- Branch/service: Army
- Years of service: 1945–1977
- Rank: Major General
- Battles/wars: Indonesian National Revolution

Busiri Suryowinoto (24 November 1926 – 4 August 1982) was an Indonesian military officer and politician who served as the Indonesian ambassador to Papua New Guinea from 1977 until 1980, and as the governor of Irian Jaya from 1981 until 1982.

== Early life, education, and career ==
Busiri was born on 24 November 1926 in Batu Marmar, Pamekasan, Madura.

Busiri enrolled at the Social and Political Faculty of the Jayabaya University. He graduated with a doctoral degree on 30 July 1977, with a thesis titled Development of the Free and Active Foreign Politics of Indonesia (Perkembangan Politik Luar Negeri R.I., yang Bebas dan Aktif).

Busiri was appointed the Secretary General of the Department of Labor and Transmigration.

== Indonesian Ambassador to Papua New Guinea ==
On 14 December 1977, Busiri was inaugurated as the Indonesian ambassador to Papua New Guinea by President Suharto, replacing Rudjito.

In the midst of June, there were reports that about 100 troops of the Indonesian army crossed the border between Indonesian and Papua New Guinea. In response, Busiri was contacted by a Papua New Guinea official on 17 June. Busiri contacted the army on the same day and claimed that the army did not know that they were already in the Papua New Guinea territory and that they planned to move back to the border on 18 June. However, government officials from Papua New Guinea stated that the troops withdrew after they were spotted by a Papua New Guinea Defence Force reconnaissance patrol on 21 June. This incident led to the increase of deployment by the Papua New Guinea Defence Force and a decrease of Indonesian activity at the border.

Following that incident, on 10 July 1978, students of the Papua New Guinea University protested against Busiri. About 500 students, citizens, and schoolchildren joined the demonstration. The protesters handed over a petition to Busiri demanding the immediate withdrawal of Indonesian Army troops from the border of Papua New Guinea and Indonesia, respect for Papua New Guinea's sovereignty, and respect for the border agreement between Papua New Guinea and Indonesia. Later, the Papua New Guinea Teacher's Organization stated their support for the demonstration.

Busiri was replaced by Abdul Aziz Bustam as the Indonesian Ambassador to Papua New Guinea on 11 April 1981.

== Governor of Irian Jaya ==
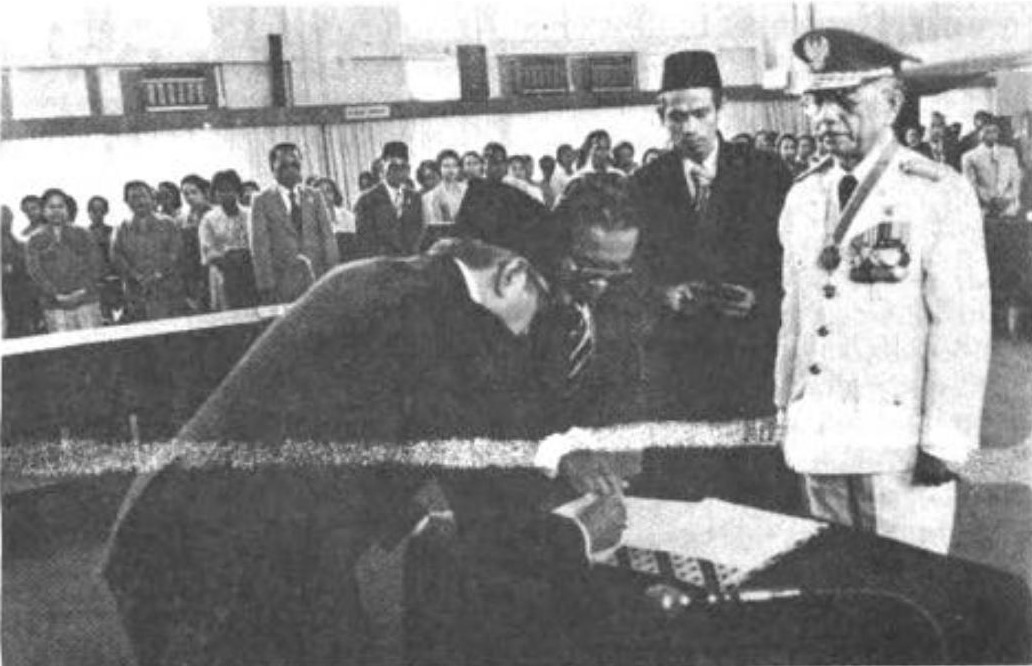
Inauguration of Busiri Suryowinoto as the Governor of Irian Jaya

=== Election and inauguration ===
The 8 December 1980 election saw three candidates contesting for the office, including Busiri. Busiri won the election with 28 out of 38 votes. He was inaugurated on 20 January 1981 by Minister of Internal Affairs Amirmachmud. After his death in office in April 1982, Busiri was replaced by his deputy, Izaac Hindom, as acting governor.

=== Splitting the province of Irian Jaya ===
Busiri was the first governor to propose splitting the Province of Irian Jaya. The initial notion for the split came from the "Regional Government Development" seminar, which was held in Jakarta in 1982 to commemorate the 16th anniversary of the Government Sciences Institute. During the seminar, there were proposals to split the province of Irian Jaya into three provinces, and the formation of new regencies. Seminar attendees debated whether to begin the split by forming the three provinces first or by forming the new regencies first.

Regarding this debate, Busiri then called the attendees of the seminar, namely John Djopari, Michael Menufandu, Obednego Rumkorem, Martinus Howay, and several members of the People's Representative Council from the Irian Jaya constituency, namely MC Da Lopez, Izaac Hindom, Izaac Saujay, Mochammad Wasaraka, and Sudarko. Busiri obliged them to give written advice to him about the proposal to split the province.

Before his death in early August 1982, Busiri came up with three different proposals, which combined both ideas of forming the provinces and the regencies. The three proposals by Busiri were considered by Korano Nicolash LMS, a Kompas reporter, as the first comprehensive and detailed proposal for the split.

Busiri's three proposals
First proposal	Second proposal	Third proposal
North Irian Jaya (142.548 km^{2} ) Capital: Jayapura; Regencies: Jayapura (Jayapura), Arso-Oksibil (Arso), Mamberamo (Sarmi), Jayawijaya (Wamena), Mulia (Mulia), Enarotali (Enarotali), Nabire (Nabire)	North Irian Jaya (119.152 km^{2} ) Capital: Jayapura; Regencies: Jayapura (Jayapura), Arso-Oksibil (Arso), Mamberamo (Sarmi), Jayawijaya (Wamena), Yapen-Waropen (Serui), Teluk Cenderawasih (Biak)	East Irian Jaya; Capital: Jayapura; Regencies: Jayapura (Jayapura), Arso-Oksibil (Arso), Mamberamo (Sarmi), Merauke (Merauke), Digul (Tanah Merah), Asmat (Agats), Jayawijaya (Wamena)
South Irian Jaya (167.786 km^{2} ) Capital: Mapurajaya; Regencies: Merauke (Merauke), Digul (Tanah Merah), Asmat (Agats), Fakfak (Fakfak)	South Irian Jaya (190.186 km^{2} ) Capital: Mapurajaya; Regencies: Merauke (Merauke), Digul (Tanah Merah), Asmat (Agats), Mulia (Mulia), Enarotali (Enarotali), Nabire (Nabire)	Central Irian Jaya; Capital: Mapurajaya; Regencies: Mapurajaya (Mapurajaya), Nabire (Nabire), Enarotali (Enarotali), Mulia (Mulia), Yapen-Waropen (Serui), Teluk Cenderawasih (Biak)
West Irian Jaya (100.326 km^{2} ) Capital: Manokwari; Regencies: Sorong (Sorong), Teminabuan (Teminabuan), Manokwari (Manokwari), Teluk Cenderawasih (Biak), Yapen-Waropen (Serui).	West Irian Jaya (101.321 km^{2} ) Capital: Manokwari; Regencies: Fakfak (Fakfak), Teminabuan (Teminabuan), Manokwari (Manokwari) dan Kabupaten Sorong (Sorong)	West Irian Jaya; Capital: Manokwari; Regencies: Fakfak (Fakfak), Teminabuan (Teminabuan), Manokwari (Manokwari) dan Kabupaten Sorong (Sorong)

=== Development of sport ===
After his inauguration, one of Busiri's goals was to prepare the Irian Jaya team to face the 1981 National Sports Week. He inaugurated the shadow team for the National Sports Week, which consisted of 192 athletes and 37 officials, on 27 April 1981. The inauguration marked the beginning of the training process for the team, which lasted for five months until the D-day of the 1981 National Sports Week. In his statement at the inauguration of the shadow team, Busiri expressed his hopes of improving the ranking of Irian Jaya from 8th place to 6th place.

The Irian Jaya contingent, which consisted of 253 athletes and officials from 19 sports, was sent to Jakarta in four waves beginning on 29 August 1981. To show moral support to the athletes, Busiri, along with all the regents of Irian Jaya, attended the event.

The Irian Jaya contingent finished the event in 7th place, with 13 gold medals, 24 silver medals, and 17 bronze medals.

After the end of the National Sports Week, Busiri continued to introduce new programs to improve the welfare of athletes in Irian Jaya. For example, Busiri provided 21 million rupiahs worth of savings for Irian Jaya athletes. For his efforts, the Sports Journalists Section of the Indonesian Journalists Association awarded Busiri the title of "Best Sports Advisor".

== Death ==
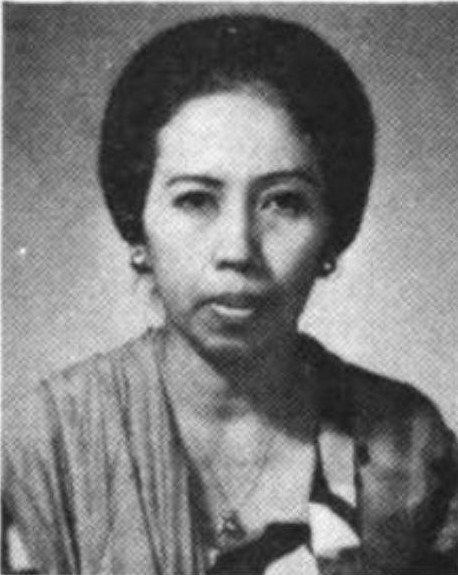
Enny Achyani

From 1982, Busiri suffered from cholelithiasis. On 3 August 1982, Busiri, accompanied by his wife, his son, and his private secretary, departed to Tokyo to undergo an operation. Busiri died on his way from the Narita Airport to the Jutendo Hospital at 12:00 on 4 August 1982.

His body arrived at the Halim Perdanakusuma Airport from Japan a day after his death. He was buried on 6 August 1982.

== Personal life ==
Busiri was married to Enny Achyani. The marriage resulted in nine children.
