= IPB University =

University in Bogor, Indonesia

- Institut Pertanian Bogor (Indonesian)
- Other names: Bogor Institute of Agriculture (lit.); Bogor Agricultural University (pre-2019)
- Motto: Inspiring Innovation with Integrity
- Type: State university
- Established: September 1, 1963
- Affiliations: ASAIHL
- Rector: Dr. Alim Setiawan Slamet
- Location: Bogor, Indonesia; 6°33′15″S 106°43′24″E
- Campus: Both urban and rural total 6,651,635 m^{2}
- Website: www.ipb.ac.id

- Location within West Java Location within Indonesia

IPB University (or formerly Bogor Agricultural University) (Indonesian: Institut Pertanian Bogor, abbreviated as IPB; Sundanese: ᮄᮔ᮪ᮞ᮪ᮒᮤᮒᮥᮒ᮪ ᮕᮨᮁᮒᮔᮤᮃᮔ᮪ ᮘᮧᮌᮧᮁ) is a state-run agricultural university based in the regency of Bogor, Indonesia. IPB has long been considered one of the "Big 5" universities in Indonesia, along with University of Indonesia, Bandung Institute of Technology, Gadjah Mada University and Airlangga University.

== History ==
The institute began as an agricultural school formed by the Dutch colonial regime in the early 20th century. After independence it was part of the University of Indonesia before becoming an independent institute on September 1, 1963.

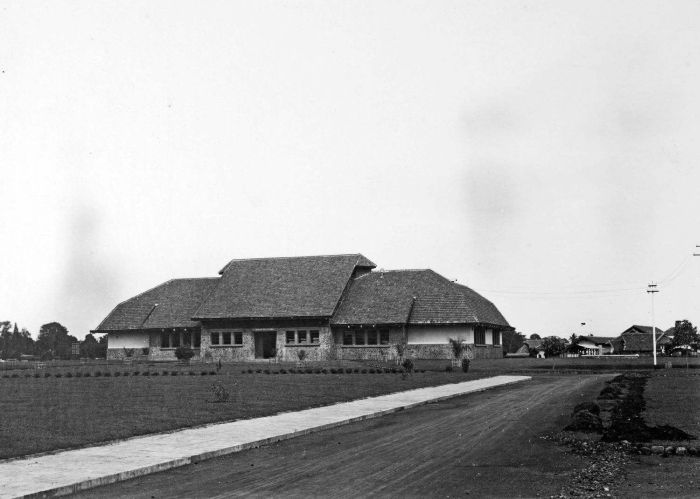
The Nederlandsch Indische Veeartsenschool in the 1920s

The first school in Bogor was established in 1876 under Rudolph Scheffer, under the name Landbouwschool te Buitenzorg (Agriculture School at Buitenzorg). New schools for different fields were opened in the following years for Native Indonesians. The institute started in the early 20th century as a veterinary medicine and agricultural school. Before World War II, the institutions were known as Middelbare Landbouwschool (secondary agricultural school), Middelbare Bosbouwschool (secondary forestry school) and Nederlandsch-Indische Veeartsenijschool (The Dutch East Indies Veterinarian School). The appointment of Hermanus Johannes Lovink as Department Director of Agricultural Education in 1910 marked a curriculum shift toward training for the government and private sides of colonial agribusiness, including basic biology classes augmented with practical education about cultivation techniques and technologies. Lovink argued that department officials in the Ministry of Agriculture "needed to familiarize themselves with Javanese farming practices."

In 1940, the Dutch government founded an institution of agricultural higher education in Bogor under the name Landbouw Hogeschool, which later on 31 October 1941 was then called the Landbouwkundige Faculteit (Agronomy Faculty). However, the school was closed down during the Japanese occupation (1942–1945). The Nederlandsch-Indische Veeartsenijschool remained in operation, but its name was changed to Bogōru jūigakkō (ボゴール獣医学校) (Bogor Veterinary School).

After the declaration of independence in 1946, the Ministry of Social Welfare of the new Republic of Indonesia promoted the Veterinary School in Bogor, into the College of Veterinary Medicine (PTKH). The Netherlands returned to Indonesia and regained control of the institution in 1947, thus the Landbouwkundige Faculteit was reopened as the Faculteit voor Landbouw-Wetenschappen, which had majors in Agriculture and Forestry. In 1948, the PTKH was changed to Faculteit voor Diergeneeskunde under Universiteit van Indonesië (later the University of Indonesia).

After Indonesia gained its independence in 1950, the Faculteit voor Landbouw-Wetenschappen became the Faculty of Agriculture of the University of Indonesia, with three departments: Socio-Economics, Physical Sciences, and Forestry. In 1957, the Department of Land Fishery was then formed. Meanwhile, Faculteit voor Diergeneeskunde became the Faculty of Veterinary Medicines and Animal Husbandry.

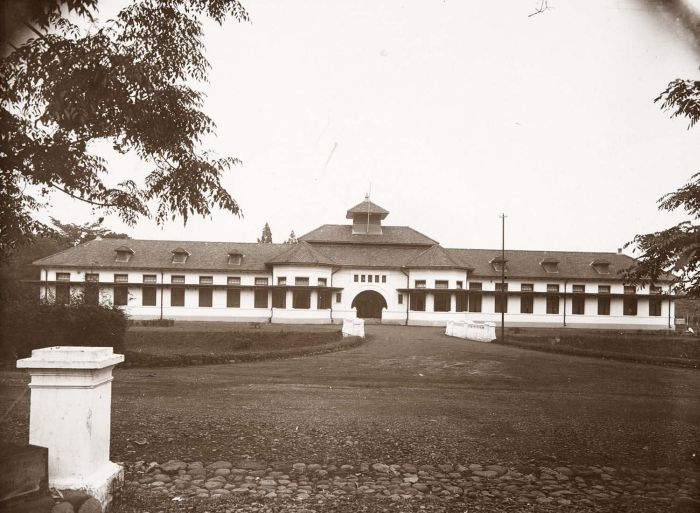
The Middelbare Landbouwschool Buitenzorg in the 1920s

IPB was founded on September 1, 1963, by the decision of the Minister of Science and Higher Education No. 92/1963 and was approved by President Sukarno's decree No. 279/1965. At the time, the two faculties of University of Indonesia located in Bogor were separated into an independent institution. IPB's five initial faculties at its establishment included the Faculty of Agriculture, Veterinary Medicine, Fisheries, Animal Science, and Forestry.

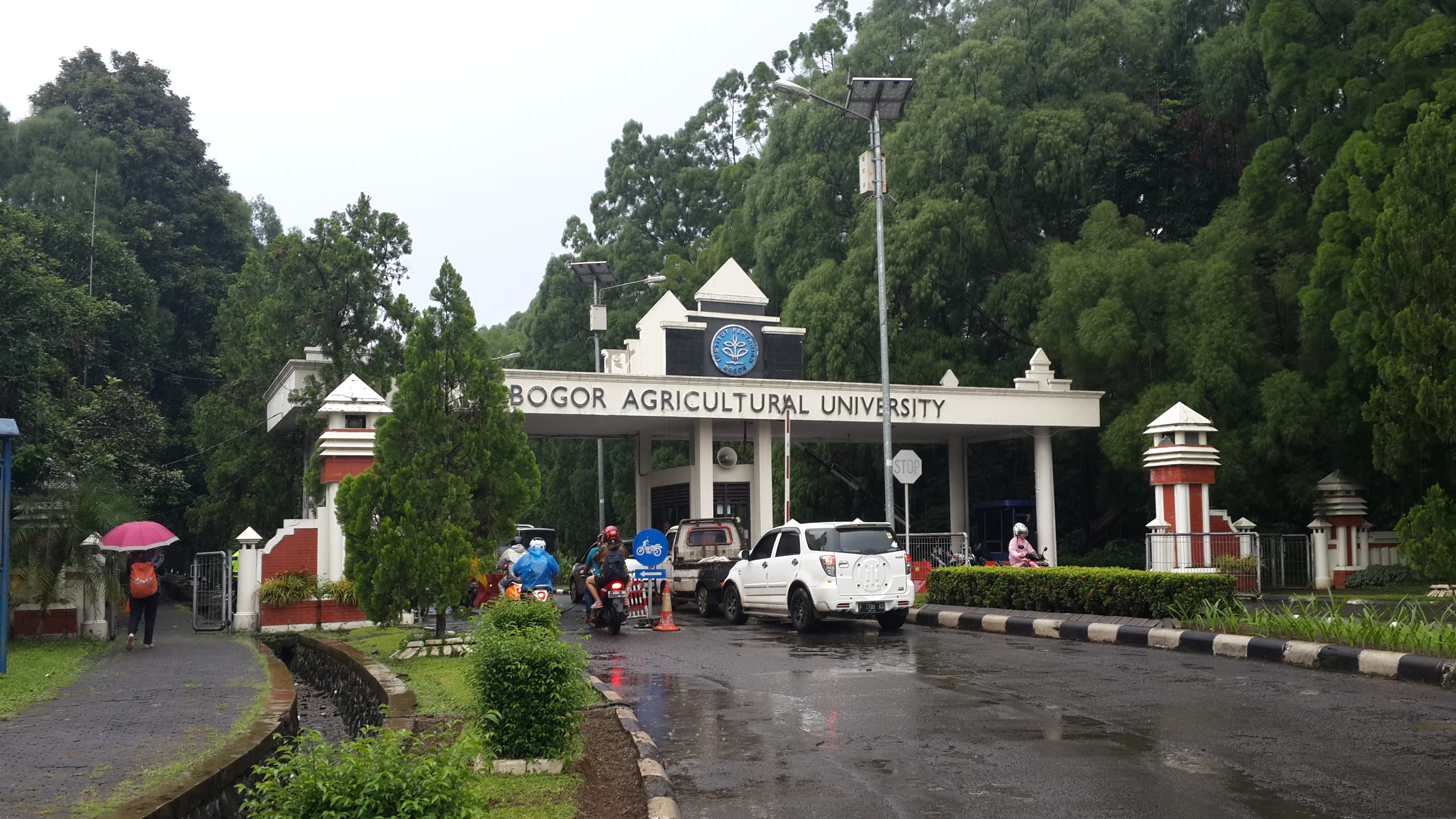
The entrance gate of the IPB University, Bogor, Indonesia

On December 26, 2000, the Indonesia government changed IPB's autonomy status to a state-owned university.

In 2005, IPB applied the minor and major system instead of the national curriculum system. This allow IPB students to take more than one department field.

== Symbol and flags ==
=== Logo and philosophy ===
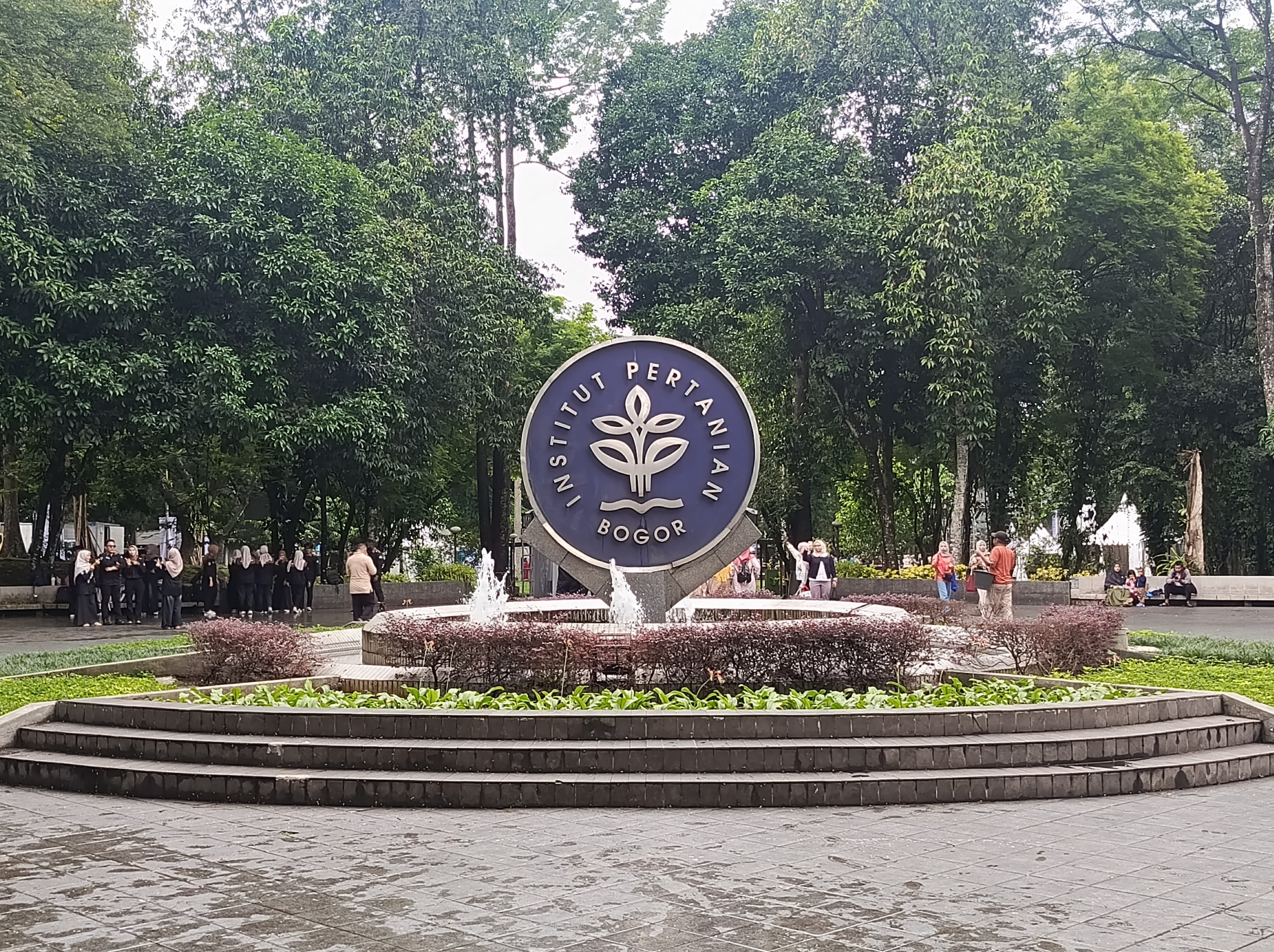
IPB coin in IPB campus park, which shows the logo of IPB

The logo consist of "Institut Pertanian Bogor" text, a tree with three branches and five leaves, and an open book which are all lined by a white circle on a blue background. The logo reflects IPB as an academic institution, source of knowledge and technology, with the "Tridarma Perguruan Tinggi" obligation.

The basic blue color symbolizes IPB as a science and technology university, the open book symbolizes IPB as a source of knowledge, the circle symbolizes that science has no limits and always growing, the three branches growing from the book symbolize the Tridarma Perguruan Tinggi (IPB's three commitments, of education, research and community service), and the five leaves represent the first five faculties of IPB and symbolize Tridarma Perguruan Tinggi which is based on Pancasila.

== Campuses ==
- IPB Darmaga Campus
- IPB Baranang Siang Campus
- IPB Gunung Gede Campus
- IPB Cilibende
- IPB Taman Kencana
- IPB Sukabumi

== Faculties and departments ==
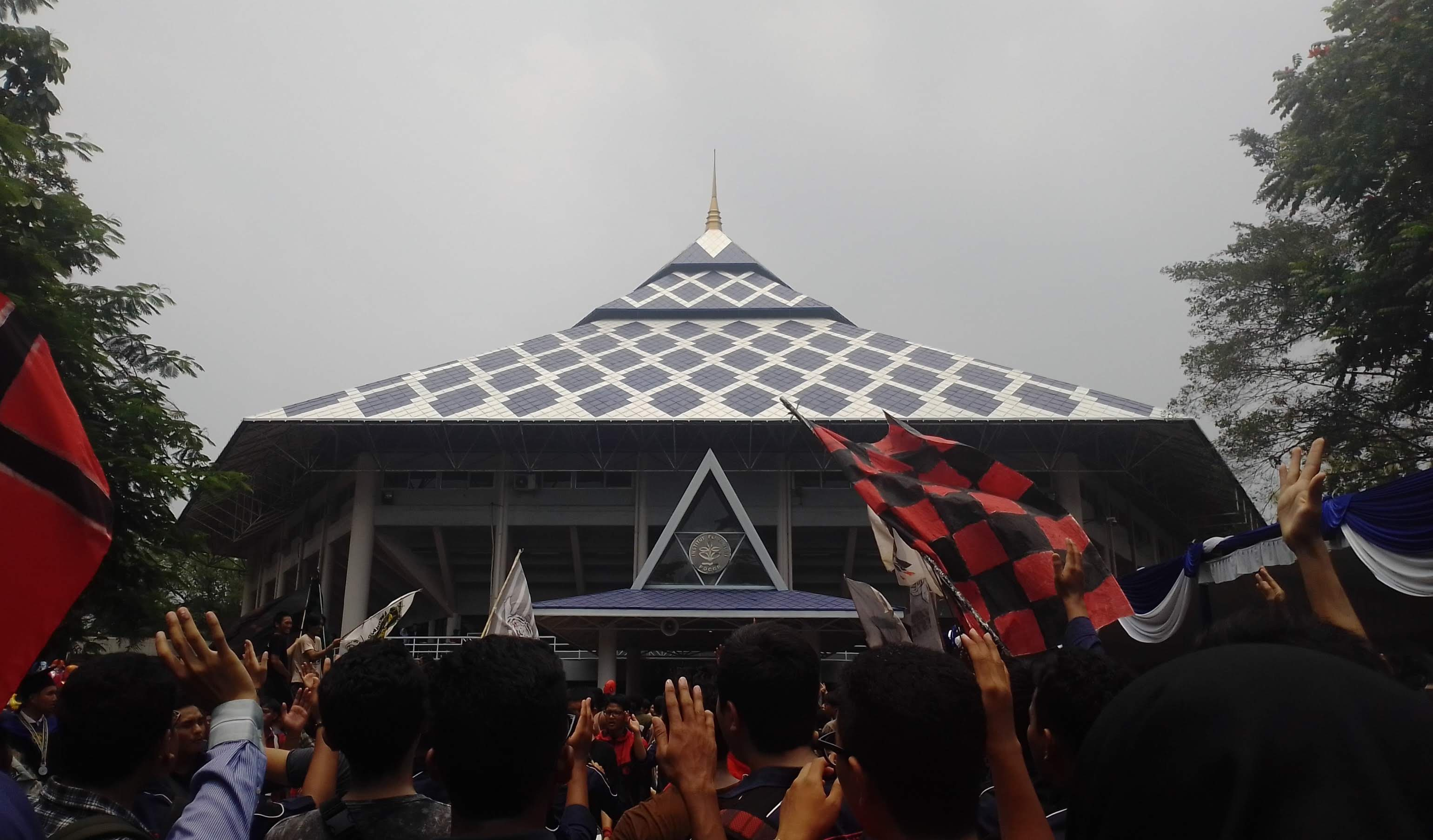
Graha Widya Wisuda, the hall of the Dramaga Campus. A cheering march of students from Faculty of Agricultural Engineering and Technology is seen here, celebrating their fellows' graduation.

IPB consists of eleven faculties or schools providing ranges of undergraduate and postgraduate program. IPB in 1972 implemented a four-year undergraduate curriculum and opened the first graduate school in Indonesia in 1975.

IPB new undergraduate students are required to pass a Common First Year Program before entering any faculties or department although they are enrolled as a student of specific faculties and department. The regulation not apply to vocational (diploma) and graduate programs.

- Faculty of Agriculture
  - Departments:
1. Land Resources Management
2. Agronomy and Horticulture
3. Plant Protection
4. Landscape Architecture
5. Smart Agriculture
- School of Veterinary Medicine and Biomedical Sciences
  - Departments:
1. Veterinary Medicine
2. Biomedical Sciences
- Faculty of Fisheries and Marine Sciences
  - Departments:
1. Technology and Management of Aquaculture
2. Aquatic Resources Management
3. Aquatic Products Technology
4. Fishing Management and Technology
5. Marine Science and Technology
- Faculty of Animal Science
  - Departments:
1. Animal Production Technology
2. Nutrition and Feed Technology
3. Technology of Cattle Products
- Faculty of Forestry and Environment
  - Departments:
1. Forest Management
2. Forest Products
3. Conservation of Forest Resources and Ecotourism
4. Silviculture
- Faculty of Engineering and Technology
  - Departments:
1. Agricultural and Biosystem Engineering
2. Food Science and Technology
3. Agro-industrial Technology
4. Civil and Environmental Engineering
5. Mechanical Engineering
6. Chemical Engineering
- Faculty of Mathematics and Natural Sciences
  - Departments:
1. Geophysics and Meteorology
2. Biology
3. Chemistry
4. Physics
5. Biochemistry
6. Bioinformatics
- Faculty of Economics and Management
  - Departments:
1. Economics and Development Studies
2. Management
3. Agribusiness
4. Resources and Environmental Economics
5. Sharia Economics
- Faculty of Human Ecology
  - Departments:
1. Nutrition Sciences
2. Family and Consumer Science
3. Communication and Community Development
- School of Business
- Faculty of Medicine
- School of Data Science, Mathematics, and Informatics
  - Departments:
1. Statistics and Data Science
2. Mathematics
3. Computer Science
4. Actuaria
5. Artificial Intelligence
- Vocational School
- Graduate School of Professional and Multidisciplinary Programs

== Green Campus ==
Starting on September 1, 2015, no ordinary fuel-vehicles are allowed to enter Green Campus Area. The authority provides 1,500 rental bikes, 44 electric cars and 20 gas-fueled buses. Electric cars and buses should have their fare paid electronically.

== Rankings ==
University rankings

Global – Overall
- QS World: 399 (2026)
- THE World: 1201-1500 (2024)
- UIGreenMetric Global: 34 (2023)

Global – Life sciences and medicine
- ARWU Life sciences: 401-500 (2023)
- QS Agriculture and Forestry: 51 (2023)
- THE Life Sciences: 801-1000 (2024)

Regional – Overall
- QS Asia: 112 (2022)
- THE Asia: 401-500 (2023)

The QS Asia University Rankings 2022 has ranked Bogor Agricultural University as number 112. In 2023, Bogor Agricultural University was ranked 449th worldwide according to the Top QS World University Rankings 2023, as well as ranked 112th in the Top QS Asian University Rankings 2022 (fifth in Indonesia after Gadjah Mada University, Bandung Institute of Technology, University of Indonesia and Airlangga University).

=== Subject ===
QS World University Rankings by Subject 2026

World rank	Subject
48	▲ Agriculture & Forestry
51 – 100	Veterinary Science
101 – 150	
151 – 200	
201 – 250	
251 – 300	
301 – 350	
351 – 400	Economics & Econometrics
401 – 450	
451 – 500	
501 – 550	Environmental Sciences
551 – 600	
601 – 650	▲ Biological Sciences; ▼ Business & Management Studies
651 – 700	

== Seed Center ==
The university plans develop a Seed Center at Leuwikopo, Dramaga, Bogor due to Indonesia has to import seeds so far and facing a problem of seed supply. The center will develop agricultural seeds, plantation seeds, animal husbandry and fishery.

== Notable alumni ==
- Ade Supandi, Chief of Staff of the Indonesian Navy
- Adhyaksa Dault, Ministry of Youth and Sports
- Ahmad Heryawan, Governor of West Java
- Andi Hakim Nasoetion, scholar
- Andung A. Nitimihardja, Minister of Industry (2004–2005), Commissioner of PLN
- Anton Apriantono, Minister of Agriculture of the Republic of Indonesia (2004–2009).
- Audy Joinaldy, Deputy Governor of West Sumatra
- Bobby Nasution, Governor of North Sumatra
- Bungaran Saragih, Minister of Agriculture (2001–2004)
- Prof. Dr. Ir. Didik J Rachbini, Professor at the University of Indonesia and Member of Parliament (2004–2009)
- Felix Siauw, Islamic preacher, writer and businessman
- Dr. Ir. Hasjrul Harahap, Minister of Environment and Forestry of the Republic of Indonesia (1988–1993).
- Iqbal Assegaf, Indonesian political activist, member of the People's Representative Council of Indonesia period 1998-2003 from the Golkar Party.
- Joe Hin Tjio, geneticist
- Kahiyang Ayu, daughter of President Joko Widodo
- Malam Sambat Kaban, Minister of Forestry
- Mustafa Abubakar, State Minister for State Enterprises of the Republic of Indonesia (2009–2011).
- Nur Mahmudi Ismail, Minister of Environment and Forestry of the Republic of Indonesia (1999–2001), Mayor of Depok (2005–2010).
- Prijadi Praptosuhardjo, Minister of Finance
- Rokhmin Dahuri, Minister of Marine and Fishery (2001–2004)
- Sajogjo, founder of Indonesian poverty line
- Siti Nurbaya Bakar, Minister of Environment and Forestry of the Republic of Indonesia (2014–Present).
- Prof. Dr. Ir. Sjarifuddin Baharsyah, Minister of Agriculture (1993–1998)
- Sukanda Kartasasmita, Member of House of Representatives (1997–1998) and Regent of Subang (1978–1988).
- Susilo Bambang Yudhoyono, sixth President of Indonesia.
- Ir. Suswono MM, Minister of Agriculture of the Republic of Indonesia (2009–2014).
- Taufik Ismail (1935-), writer and poet.
- Prof. Dr. Ir. Yustika Baharsyah, Minister of Agriculture (March 1998-December 1998) and Minister of Social
- Zumi Zola, Governor of Jambi

== See also ==
- List of universities in Indonesia
- Education in Indonesia
- Bogor Botanical Gardens
- List of forestry universities and colleges
