= Soetran =

Indonesian politician and general (1921–1987)

Brigadier General Soetran
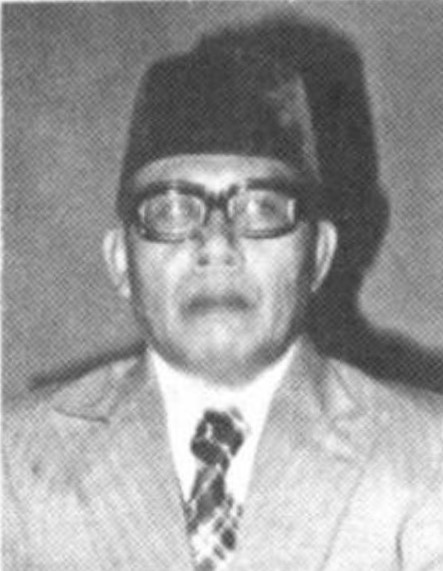
- Soetran c. 1978

Governor of Irian Jaya
- In office 31 March 1975 – 20 January 1981
- President: Suharto
- Deputy: Jan Mamoribo; Elias Paprindey; Izaac Hindom
- Preceded by: Acub Zainal
- Succeeded by: Busiri Suryowinoto

Regent of Trenggalek
- In office 3 October 1968 – 25 March 1975
- Governor: Mohammad Noer
- Preceded by: Moeladi
- Succeeded by: Muchammad Poernanto (acting); Soedarso

Personal details
- Born: 5 April 1921 Cangkring Village, Soerabaja Residency, Dutch East Indies (today in Sidoarjo)
- Died: 1 July 1987 (aged 66) Darmo Hospital, Surabaya, East Java, Indonesia
- Party: Golkar

Military service
- Allegiance: Indonesia
- Branch/service: Army
- Years of service: 1942–1968
- Rank: Brigadier general

Soetran (5 April 1921 – 1 July 1987) was an Indonesian military officer and politician who served as the Regent of Trenggalek from 1968 until 1975 and as the Governor of Irian Jaya from 1975 to 1981.

Born in Sidoarjo, Soetran dropped out of elementary school and settled down to become a soldier. He joined the Defenders of the Homeland in 1942 with the rank of budancho. He was later transferred to Merauke and Trenggalek as a commander.

Soetran became the regent of Trenggalek in 1968. His leadership in the region was characterized by his command approach. He managed to transform the region into a center of clove production. He also enacted the tembokisasi (construction of walls) and reforestation in the region in an attempt to increase the standards of living. He was elected to a second term in 1973, and the region received an award as the best-performing region in 1974. For his achievements in Trenggalek, Soetran was elected as the Governor of Irian Jaya in 1975. Under his leadership, the province experienced two consecutive earthquakes in 1976. (Note: Another earthquake occurred the day Soetran left office.) He ended his term in 1981, four months longer than scheduled.

Soetran moved to Surabaya following his resignation as governor. He died in 1987.

== Early life ==
Soetran was born on 5 April 1921 in Cangkring Village, a small village in Sidoarjo, East Java, to a working-class family.

Due to his father's blindness, Soetran dropped out of elementary school in the 4th grade and began to work at various jobs, such as a farmer, entertainer, and a ludruk performer.

== Military career ==
In 1942, following the Japanese occupation of the Dutch East Indies, Soetran joined the Defenders of the Homeland organization, a volunteer army organization formed by the Japanese. He was given the rank of budancho (equivalent to a sergeant). After the Indonesian independence, he joined the People's Security Bureau (the forerunner of the Indonesian National Armed Forces) and was put in command of a squad in the Tjipto Battalion.

After the Indonesia National Revolution ended in 1949, Soetran enrolled in the officer course and graduated as a first lieutenant in 1950. He then enrolled in several other military education programs, such as Preparation Course for Officers in 1956 and Advanced Officers Course in 1957.

In 1958, Soetran served as the Deputy Commander of the 511th Infantry Battalion with the rank of First Lieutenant, and he was promoted four years later to the rank of Captain and became the battalion's commander. Less than a year, in 1963, he was transferred to Irian Jaya and became the commander of the Tanah Merah Military District in Merauke. In 1967, he was reassigned to East Java, promoted to Mayor, and became the commander of the Trenggalek Military District.

In 1980, at the end of his term as the Governor of Irian Jaya, Soetran was promoted from colonel to brigadier general.

== Regent of Trenggalek ==
=== Clove cultivation ===
On 3 October 1968, Soetran was inaugurated as the Regent of Trenggalek, replacing Moeladi. Before his term, Trenggalek was known as a poverty-stricken area. Trenggalek frequently experienced long periods of dry season, causing droughts in the area. Gaplek, the staple food source in the region, could not be grown during this period.

Following Soetran's rise to the regent office in Trenggalek, Soetran began to seek a solution for this problem. After experimenting with several high-valued commodities, Soetran found out that cloves could grow well in the Trenggalek region. Slowly, Soetran began to oblige Trenggalek's populace to cultivate clove.

The project yielded its results not long after it was commenced. The barren lands of Trenggalek transformed into green clove plantations and the region became the center of clove production in East Java. Although clove plantations only covered about 16% of the arable lands in Trenggalek, clove cultivation managed to yield an additional 21 trillion rupiahs per year for Trenggalek's populace. The region later became identical with clove, and the populace began to rely solely on cloves.

Donald K. Emmerson, a political professor, credited Trenggalek's development under Soetran on his self-styled "commando" approach. According to Emmerson, Soetran assumed full responsibility on the development process in the region and ran the government as an extension of himself.

=== Construction and development ===
Prior to his appointment as the regent, government offices, military offices, and houses in Trenggalek were in bad condition. Soetran attempted to improve this problem by initiating the Tembokisasi program which aimed at remodeling Trenggalek's cityscape. The program encouraged Trenggalek's populace to construct walls in their houses and villages. As of 1972, about several hundred kilometers of houses in Trenggalek have been fully walled.

Aside from the Tembokisasi program, Soetran also encouraged reforestation in Trenggalek. Soetran instructed the populace to "not leave any patch of land uncultivated". Soetran's reforestation policy managed to kept the region safe from prolonged droughts and provide additional exports.

=== Renaming Trenggalek ===
In 1971, under the pretext of embellishing the stereotype of the region, Soetran proposed to change the name of Trenggalek to Trenggalih. According to Soetran, words which end with -ek in Javanese usually has a bad connotation (e.g. jelek/elek (ugly), kemenyek (smart ass), tekek (deaf), etc.). Soetran planned to change the name of Trenggalek, which was frequently mocked by Javanese speakers as the abbreviation of terang enggone wong elek (clearly the place of ugly faces) to Trenggalih, with its abbreviation Terang Ing Galih (light in our heart).

Most of Trenggalek's officials opposed Soetran's plan, citing the administrative and bureaucratic process that would occur after the change. However, Soetran continued with his plan, and in the same year, he formed a team to investigate the beginnings of Trenggalek, the first appearance of its name, and the possibility to rename the regency in relation to the first appearance. In 1975, at the end of his term, Soetran increased the size of the team. The project continued several years after Soetran left the regency. The team managed to found out and document the beginnings of Trenggalek and its first appearance ten years later but refused to change the name of the regency.

=== Parasamya Purnakarya Nugraha ===
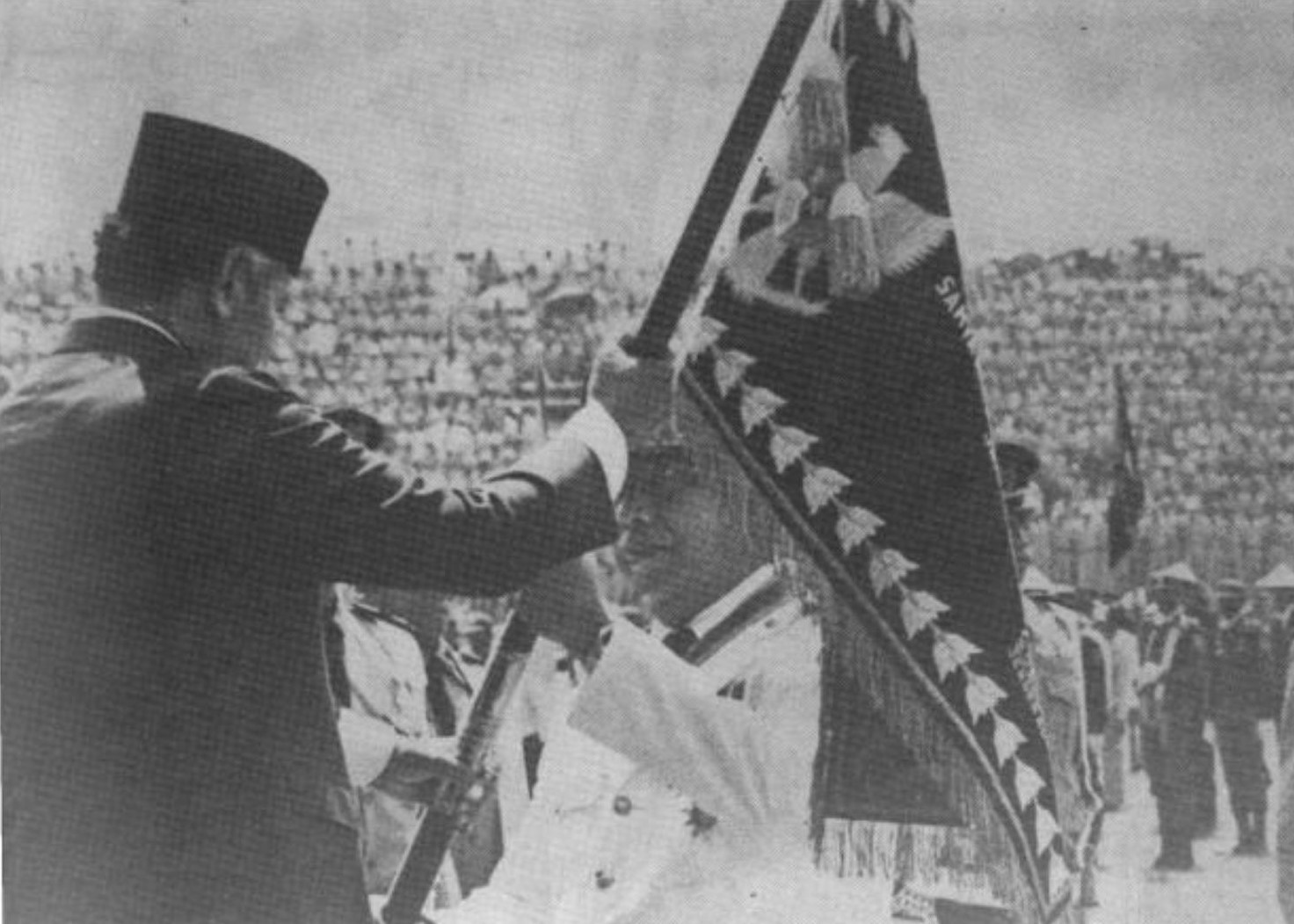
President Soeharto handing over the Parasamya Purnakarya Nugraha award to Governor Mohammad Noer.

Soetran's success of his clove cultivation program in Trenggalek resulted in his re-election for a second term in 1973. In 1974, the regency obtained the Parasamya Purnakarya Nugraha award, an award given by the president to the best-performed regions in Indonesia during the first five year-plan. The award was given in the form of a flag by President Suharto to East Java Governor Mohammad Noer in a ceremony on 21 August 1974 at the Tambaksari Stadium.

=== Legacy ===
The government of Trenggalek honored Soetran by creating the Soetran Award. The award was given to villages in Trenggalek who come up with local innovations. The winner of the award is entitled to receive additional village funding.

A street in Trenggalek is named after Soetran.

== Governor of Irian Jaya ==
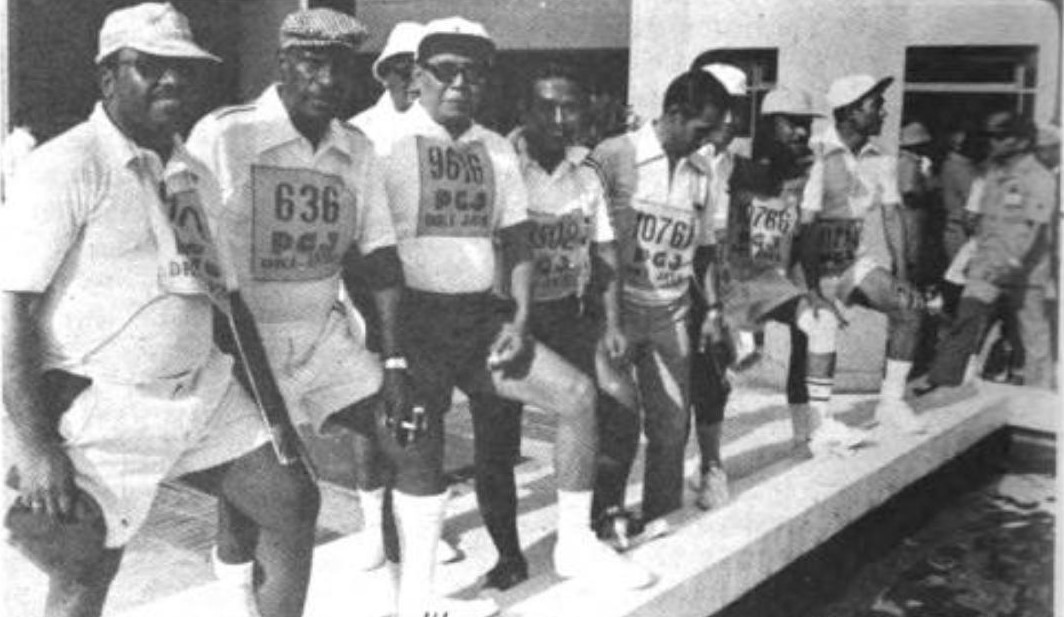
Soetran (third from left) with regents from Irian Jaya in Jakarta.

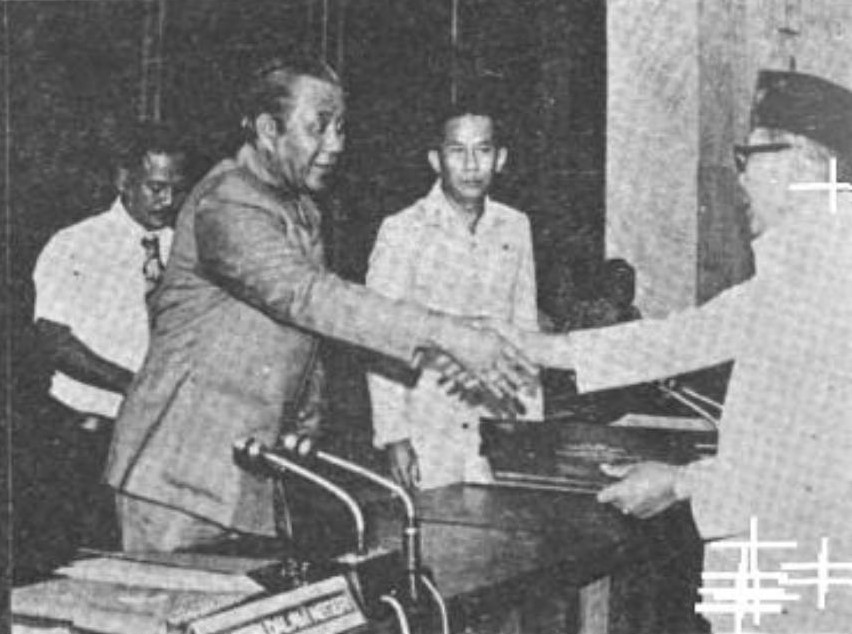
Soetran (right) receiving the list of projects for the national development in Irian Jaya from the Minister of Internal Affairs Amirmachmud.

Soetran was inaugurated as the acting governor of Irian Jaya on 31 April 1975, replacing Acub Zainal. His term as acting governor ended after he was inaugurated as a definitive governor on 12 August 1975. His term was intended to end on 4 September 1980, but due to the lack of replacement, his term was extended for another four months until 20 January 1981.

=== Obligatory clove cultivation ===
After he was appointed to the office of governor in Irian Jaya, Soetran implemented the same program he had implemented in Trenggalek seven years before. On 20 May 1975, Soetran declared the Obligatory Clove Cultivation (Wajib Tanam Cengkeh, WTC) program. Soetran argued that the program would contribute significantly to Irian Jaya's regional income and increase development in the region. For his program, Soetran earned the nickname of "Clove Governor".

Under his decree, Soetran obliged all families in Irian Jaya to cultivate cloves in their backyard. According to his decree, families who lived in the village should plant at least 20 cloves, 5—10 cloves for families who lived in the suburbs, and five cloves for those who lived in cities. Schools, offices, dormitories, and places of worship were also obliged to cultivate cloves. Aside from the populace's small scale cultivation, Soetran oversaw the development of clove plantations managed by the regency and province government.

Several days after the program had begun, Soetran requested funding from the then-President of Indonesia, Suharto. His request was fulfilled after Suharto lent 250 million rupiahs for the project on 20 November 1975, with 50 million rupiahs being given in the first year. Soetran planned to spend 35 million rupiahs to buy clove seeds from Trenggalek.

However, the project soon met its failure. In a pilot project that involved gubernatorial employees cultivating 2,000 clove seeds, fewer than 10% of the seeds survived the first year. An agricultural expert remarked that the failure was due to the employees' inability to cultivate the cloves. Another reason for the failure was Soetran's violation of the Agriculture Minister's instruction, which states that clove seeds could only be exported from four locations: Selokaton, Branggah Banaran, Bogor, and Maluku. Soetran's decision to import clove seeds from Trenggalek was considered a blunder by an agricultural expert, as clove seeds from the location had never been researched before.

Julius Ary Mollet, a researcher from the Cenderawasih University, blamed the failure on socialization. He stated that people were more reluctant to cultivate and market the harvested cloves due to the lack of education regarding the benefits of clove cultivation.

Following Soetran's resignation from the office, his successor, Busiri Suryowinoto, questioned his policy on clove cultivation. Busiri replaced Soetran's program on clove cultivation with crop cultivation, as he believed that cloves were unsuitable for the region.

=== Irian Jaya earthquake ===
During Soetran's rule, the province experienced two consecutive earthquakes. The first earthquake, which occurred on 26 June 1976 and measured 7,1 on Richter scale, continued for a week. As a result, 12 large villages in the Baliem Valley were destroyed. The Kurima, Okbibab, and Oksibil subdistricts, all located in the Jayawijaya Regency, were completely destroyed by the earthquake. As of 5 July 1976, 369 people were found dead and 5001 people were declared missing.

Following the earthquake, the survivors were evacuated and accommodated at the refugee camps. A government official described the situation in the refugee camps as "miserable and horrible". The Regional Secretary of Irian Jaya, Syarifuddin Harahap, sent several radiograms to ministries and Irian Jayan companies and requested assistance from them. President Suharto responded to the radiograms by instructing governmental bodies to form a task force to handle the disaster. The first assistance given to the earthquake survivors was in a form of a sweet potato airdrop. Several sacks of sweet potatoes were, however, torn apart due to the fragility of the sacks. On 3 July, the government of Papua New Guinea assisted the search and rescue process by donating a Cessna aircraft.

Soetran flew to Jakarta on 10 July to discuss the matter with President Suharto. As a result, Suharto gave Soetran 100 million rupiahs to handle the disaster and declared the earthquake as a "national disaster".

Assistance from the central government to handle the task was deemed slow by Soetran. On 19 July, Soetran publicly expressed his dissatisfaction with the central government's handling of the disaster due to the fact that the task force from the central government has not yet arrived at that time. He stated that as of 19 July, only 2 doctors and 10 nurses have arrived at the disaster location. In a meeting with Suharto, he also criticized the lack of transport and medical assistance from the central government.

The United Nations Disaster Relief Coordinator (UNDRO) reported that as of 30 September, around one and a half million dollars were given by multinational organizations for the disaster relief in Irian Jaya. UNDRO estimated that the government spends at least ten thousand dollars each month on airdropping food supply to the survivors.

The second earthquake occurred in November 1976. The earthquake affected the Jayawijaya Mountains, and 110 people in the mountains died as a result. This earthquake was much smaller in scale compared to the first and received less media coverage.

=== Trans Irian Highway ===
At the end of his term, the Government of Indonesia began the Trans Irian highway. The project was officially begun by Soetran on 10 December 1980 and was split into three lanes. The project involves three different contractors and several Indonesian advisors on public works. The project continued until 2019 when it was finished under Governor Barnabas Suebu.

=== Conflict with Elias Paprindey ===
Elias Paprindey, an ethnic Papuan, was appointed as the acting vice governor, replacing Jan Mamoribo, the previous vice governor who died in office on 19 October 1976. Following his appointment as vice governor, Paprindey began a conflict relating to the development process in Irian Jaya. Paprindey accused the office of the vice-governor as being "nothing more than a symbol". In an interview with Tempo reporter Widi Yarmanto, Soetran denied any disagreement or conflict between him and Paprindey, and stated that "[our] working relationship is good".

When news of the conflict was made known to the public, ethnic Papuan civil servants in the government began expressing their dissatisfaction with the government. One of the civil servants stated, "If this goes on, we will be better off moving to Papua New Guinea". (Note: Original quote: Kalau keadaan di sini begini terus, lebih baik kami ke PNG saja.)

=== Anti-koteka campaign ===
Soetran launched an anti-koteka campaign during his term. The campaign was part of an attempt to gradually abolish koteka in the region.

== Later life ==
After his retirement from the governor's office, Soetran returned to Surabaya. He established the Father's Rotating Savings and Credit Association (Arisan Bapak-Bapak, Ariba) in his community.

== Death ==
Beginning in June 1987, Soetran undertook medical treatment for his liver cancer in Darmo Hospital, Surabaya. Soetran died in the hospital on 1 July 1987. He was buried two days after his death at the Dukuh Kupang Heroes' Cemetery in a military ceremony led by the Governor of East Java Wahono.

== Awards and honours ==
Soetran received the following honors:

- Guerilla Star
- Army Meritorious Service Star
- Armed Forces Eight Years’ Service Star
- 2nd Category Military Long Service Medals
- 1st Independence Freedom Fighters Medal
- 2nd Independence Freedom Fighters Medal
- Military Operational Service Medals I-VI and IX
- Sapta Marga Medal
- Penegak Satya Medal Lencana
- Development Medal
