= Srinardi =

Colonel Srinardi

Acting Regent of Sragen
- In office 12 May 1973 – 23 April 1974
- President: Soeharto
- Governor: Moenadi
- Preceded by: Suwarno Djojowardono
- Succeeded by: Sayid Abas

Regent of Blora
- In office 7 April 1967 – 10 May 1973
- President: Soeharto
- Governor: Moenadi
- Preceded by: Soekirno Sastrodimedjo
- Succeeded by: Soepadi Joedodarmo

Personal details
- Born: 16 July 1923 Mageru, Sragen, Dutch East Indies
- Died: 23 April 1974 (aged 50)

Military service
- Branch/service: Indonesian Army
- Years of service: 1945-1974
- Rank: Colonel
- Battles/wars: Indonesian National Revolution; Operation Security and Order

Srinardi (16 July 1923 – 23 April 1974) was a middle-ranking officer of the Indonesian Army who served as Regent of Blora (1967–1973) and Acting Regent of Sragen (1973–1974). He also led the Operation Security and Order.

== Early life and education ==
Srinardi was born in Mageru, Sragen, on 16 July 1923. He completed his elementary education at a Sekolah Rakyat (People's School, equivalent to elementary school) for five years. Afterward, he continued his studies at a Schakelschool (an extension education for People's School) for four years. After finishing his secondary education, he attended training to become a civil servant.

During his career in the Indonesian Army, Srinardi also underwent military education. He attended officer training for maintenance/logistics officers in Cimahi and successfully completed it. In 1961, he studied at the Company Command School in Magelang and graduated. In addition, he attended advanced officer training in Bandung in 1966.

== Career ==
=== Military career ===
Srinardi began his military career by joining Defenders of the Homeland (PETA) in Surakarta on 23 December 1943. He left PETA on 1 September 1945 with the rank of private.

During the National Revolution, Srinardi joined the Indonesian Army and served as Head of Armaments and Vehicles for Battalion 19 of Regiment 27 of Division X in Surakarta from 1 October 1945 to 1948 with the rank of Second Lieutenant. Subsequently, he served as Head of Supply for Battalion 1 from 1 August 1948 to 1 October 1950.

On 1 October 1950, Srinardi joined Battalion 420, which later became Battalion 441, and served in that battalion until 21 February 1956. On 1 January 1954, he was promoted from Second Lieutenant to First Lieutenant. He was then promoted to Staff Officer 1 and transferred to Battalion 440 in Ambarawa on 21 February 1956.

Srinardi was promoted from Staff Officer 1 to Captain on 1 January 1957. He then served as Company Commander at the Headquarters of Battalion 440 in Ambarawa on 3 April 1958.

On 1 July 1960, Srinardi became an officer in the Rembang Military District. He was then promoted from captain to major on 1 July 1961. On 1 September 1962, he served as Chief of Staff of Military District Command 0720 in Rembang. He was later transferred to Pati, where he served as Commander of Battalion 443 on 1 March 1963.

Srinardi then served as Commander of Military District Command (Kodim) 0721/Blora on 1 January 1965. During his tenure as Commander of Kodim 0721/Blora, he once attended a lecture on the “Jakarta–Peking Axis” organized by the Blora branch of the Indonesian Communist Party on 1 October 1965. In addition, he also served as an envoy of the VII/Diponegoro Military Regional Command (Kodam VII/Diponegoro) to shut down the Mbah Suro hermitage. He also led the Operation Security and Order against said hermitage. After leading the operation, the government promoted him from major to lieutenant colonel. His final rank before his death was colonel.

=== Political career ===
Srinardi's success in the Operation Security and Order led to his appointment as Regent of Blora on 7 April 1967, replacing R. Soekirno. He was officially inaugurated as Regent of Blora on 8 April. During his tenure as Regent of Blora, he renovated the Baitunnur Great Mosque by adding a veranda inspired by the Kauman Great Mosque and the Great Mosque of Surakarta, and built the Blora Central Market in 1973. Moreover, he also issued a policy of monitoring visitors to Sangiran in July 1973 so that historical artifacts at the site would not go missing. He also allocated financial assistance of Rp25,000 for the malaria eradication in Sragen.

On 10 May 1973, Srinardi stepped down as Regent of Blora and two days later became Acting Regent of Sragen. He served as Acting Regent of Sragen until 23 April 1974.

== Death ==
Srinardi died on 23 April 1974. He was buried at Kusuma Bhakti Heroes Cemetery in Surakarta.

== Personal life ==
Srinardi married and had six children.

== Bibliography ==
- Abdullah, Taufik; Abdurrachman, Sukri; Gunawan, Restu (2012). Malam Bencana 1965 Dalam Belitan Krisis Nasional: Bagian II Konflik Lokal. Jakarta: Yayasan Obor Indonesia.
