= Soekirno Sastrodimedjo =

Regent of Blora
- In office 1960 – 7 April 1967
- President: Sukarno; Suharto
- Governor: Mochtar; Moenadi
- Preceded by: Soenartio
- Succeeded by: Srinardi

Personal details
- Born: 16 August 1917
- Died: 18 April 1993 (aged 75)
- Party: PNI
- Profession: Politician

R. Soekirno Sastrodimedjo (16 August 1917 – 18 April 1993) was an Indonesian politician from the Indonesian National Party (PNI) who served as the Regent of Blora from 1960 to 1967.

== Biography ==
Soekirno was born on 16 August 1917. He ran for the 1955 Indonesian Constitutional Assembly election, representing the Indonesian National Party (PNI) in the Central Java electoral district.

In 1960, Soekirno was appointed Regent of Blora. He was regarded as Blora's local elite. During his tenure as Regent, he attended a lecture titled “The Jakarta–Peking Axis” in Cepu on 1 October 1965, which was organized by the Blora branch of the Communist Party of Indonesia (PKI). He was succeeded by Srinardi following Operation Security and Order. Prior to this, on 26 September 1966, he submitted a letter of resignation from his position as Regent of Blora to the Ministry of Home Affairs.

Soekirno died on 18 April 1993 and was buried at Jangkang Public Cemetery in Jomblang, Candisari, Semarang.

== Bibliography ==
- Abdullah, Taufik; Abdurrachman, Sukri; Gunawan, Restu (2012). Malam Bencana 1965 Dalam Belitan Krisis Nasional: Bagian II Konflik Lokal. Jakarta: Yayasan Obor Indonesia.
