= Plaza Indonesia =

Shopping mall in central Jakarta

Coordinates: 6.193067°S 106.821731°E

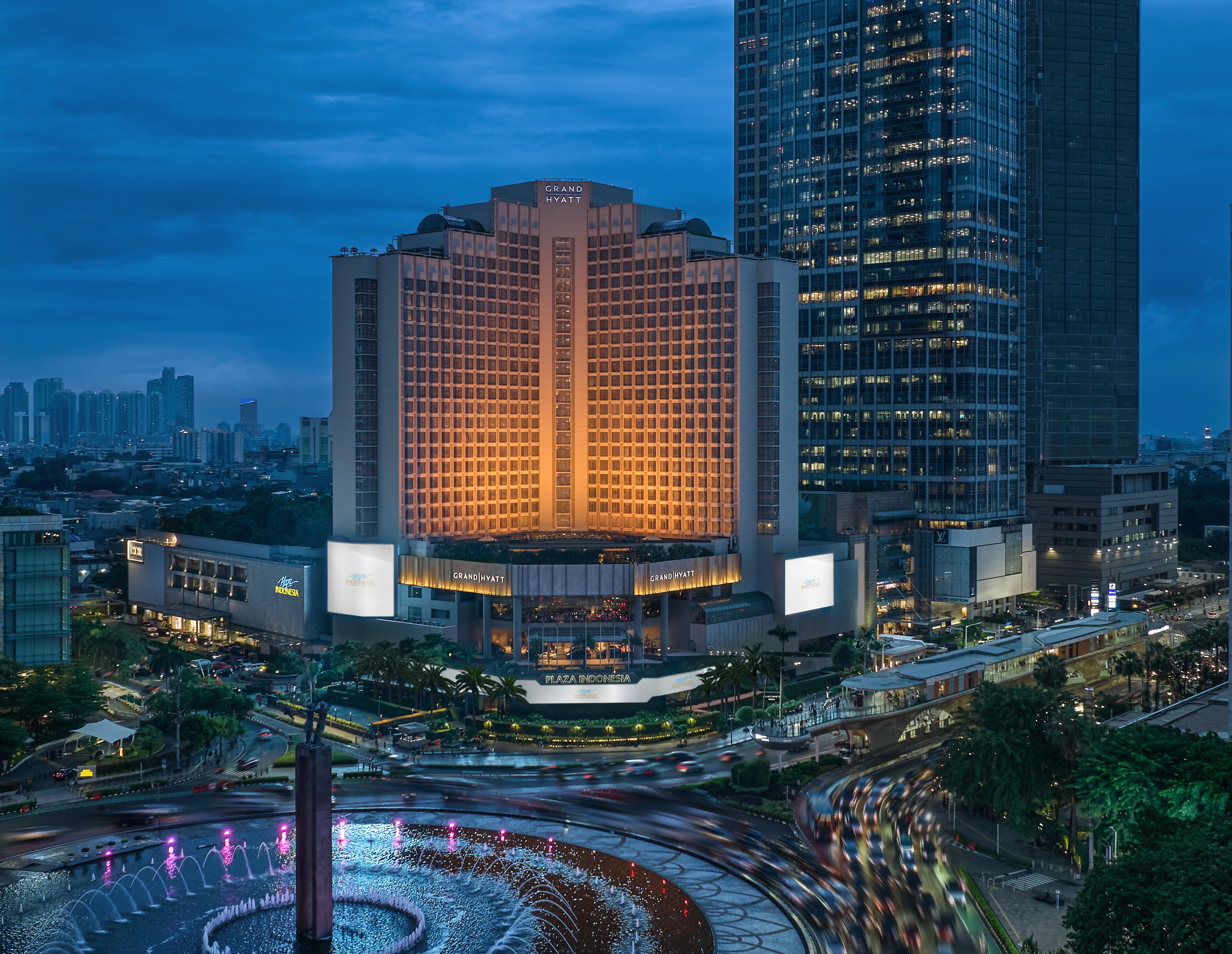
- Exterior image of mall and hotel
- Location: Central Jakarta, Indonesia
- Address: Jalan M.H. Thamrin Kav. 28-30
- Opened: March 1, 1990
- Previous names: Plaza Indonesia Shopping Center
- Developer: PT Plaza Indonesia Realty Tbk (IDX: PLIN) (Sinar Mas Land, Indonesian Paradise Property, Rosano Barack, Hankyu Hanshin Properties Corp)
- Manager: PT Plaza Indonesia Realty Tbk
- Owner: PT Plaza Indonesia Realty Tbk
- Num. of stores: 450+
- Floor area: 105,072 m^{2} (1,130,990 sq ft)
- Floors: 7 (Shopping Mall, includes one basement)
- Parking: 5 floors underground parking, with 1,904 parking bays
- Public transit: Bundaran HI Bank Jakarta; Bundaran HI Astra
- Website: plazaindonesia.com

Plaza Indonesia Complex

General information
- Type: Hotel; Commercial offices Residential
- Architectural style: Modern
- Location: Jakarta, Indonesia, Jalan M.H. Thamrin Kav 28-30, Central Jakarta
- Construction started: 2004
- Completed: 2009

Height
- Top floor: Keraton- 225 m x 1 Plaza Office Tower- 200 m x 1 Grand Hyatt Hotel- 122 m x 1

Technical details
- Floor count: Keraton- 48 floors x 1 Plaza Office Tower- 42 floors x 1 Grand Hyatt Hotel- 30 floors x 1

Design and construction
- Architects: HOK, Inc.
- Structural engineer: Davy Sukamta & Partners Structural Engineers
- Main contractor: Ssangyong Engineering & Construction

Plaza Indonesia (originally Plaza Indonesia Shopping Center) is a shopping mall and mixed-use development located at Jalan M.H. Thamrin, Central Jakarta, Indonesia. Opened in 1990, it is located at the corner of one of the landmarks of Jakarta, the Selamat Datang (Welcome) Monument. The mall is Jakarta's earliest luxury mall, housing multiply international luxury brands; some of them could not be find in other parts of Indonesia.

Aside from the shopping mall, the Plaza Indonesia complex consist of the high-end Grand Hyatt Jakarta and Keraton at the Plaza hotels, and an office building called The Plaza. The latter two were commenced in 2009. The Grand Hyatt was opened in 1991, a year after the shopping mall.

Plaza Indonesia is owned, developed, and managed by PT. Plaza Indonesia Realty Tbk. (PLIN) (formerly PT. Bimantara Eka Sentosa), a consortium between Sinar Mas Land, Hankyu Hanshin Holdings and other companies.

== History ==
The Plaza Indonesia Complex stands on the former site of Asoka Hotel. The hotel was opened in 1962 as Wisma Warta, an accommodation for journalists covering the 4th Asian Games that year. In 1984, the land of Asoka Hotel was bought for US$1.000 per square metre by a company then-known as PT. Bimantara Eka Sentosa. The hotel was ultimately closed and demolished to make way for Plaza Indonesia.

Plaza Indonesia began construction on 4 March 1987 and opened its doors on 1 March 1990 on a site of 38,050 m^{2} at the junction of Jalan M. H. Thamrin and Jalan Kebon Kacang Raya in Central Jakarta, near the iconic Selamat Datang Monument. The official inauguration was held on 24 November 1990 by first lady Tien Suharto, while the Grand Hyatt and the entire complex was inaugurated by President Suharto on 23 July 1991.

In September 1994, PLIN initiated an extension for the complex, consist of the mall extension, an office tower and a new hotel tower. It began construction on 24 September 1997, in partnership with contractors Waskita Karya and Société Auxiliaire d'Entreprises. The construction was later suspended for nine years due to the 1997 Asian financial crisis, but later officially resumed on 11 August 2006. The extension project completed in May 2009.

== Buildings in the complex ==
=== Shopping mall ===
The shopping center (initially known as Plaza Indonesia Shopping Center) was designed by Hellmuth Obata & Kassabaum, and has undergone major renovations in 1996, 2000 and 2008. Renovations of the south facade and Lamoda Café in the atrium was completed in 2014. Again in 2009, Plaza Indonesia expanded with 42,325 m^{2} of gross floor area in 6 levels, with 24,672 m^{2} more space. The first three levels of the retail extension are connected to the existing shopping center. The 4th to 6th levels are dedicated to "modern lifestyle concepts," with various dining and entertainment facilities. The extension also provides 5 levels of underground parking. The retail extension has an entrance on Jalan M.H. Thamrin.

=== Grand Hyatt Jakarta ===
Grand Hyatt Jakarta has 30 floors with 122 m high. This is the second property of Hyatt in Indonesia, after then-Hyatt-owned Aryaduta Hotel in Gambir. Construction of the hotel was finished in March 1991, four months after the official inauguration of the mall. A month later, Grand Hyatt Jakarta was inaugurated on 4 April 1991 by the Minister of Tourism, Posts, and Telecommunications, Joop Ave. A renovation was conducted in 2021 to refurbish the interior of the hotel.

=== Keraton at the Plaza ===
Keraton at the Plaza is a hotel and residential suites tower, which is 225 meters tall and has 48 floors above the ground. It is a franchise of Hyatt's The Unbound Collection. Opened on 30 April 2012, it was initially managed by Marriott International under The Luxury Collection brand until a contract agreement expired, leaving it to be closed in 2020 as the COVID-19 pandemic strikes. Keraton at the Plaza reopened in late December 2024 under the new management by Hyatt.

=== The Plaza Office Tower ===
The Plaza Office Tower is a 200 meters tall office building, which has 42 floors above the ground and 5 floors below the ground.

=== Demolished buildings ===
==== Entertainment X'nter (EX) ====
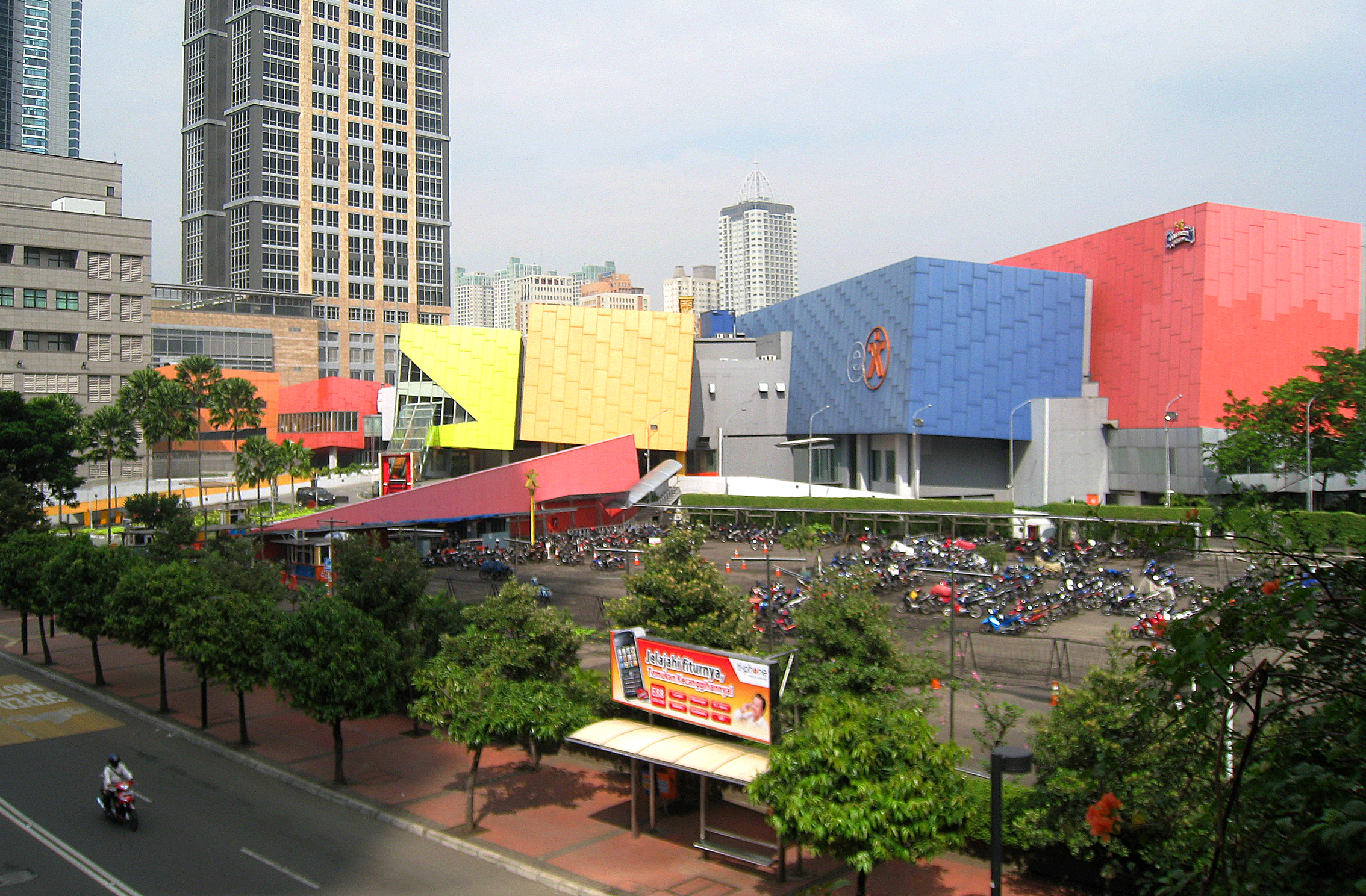
Exterior of EX Plaza Indonesia in 2010

Entertainment X'nter (EX) was part of the shopping mall extension, known for its colorful, deconstructivist architecture. It was a separated building north of the existing mall, stood on the former site of the Embassy of the Soviet Union (still used by Russia after its dissolution until 1994, before moving to Jalan H.R. Rasuna Said). Construction for the EX began in 2002 and was opened on 14 February 2004. It housed the first branch of Cinema XXI, the leading movie theatre chain in Indonesia. On 30 June 2014, Entertainment X'nter was officially closed, demolished and replaced by the Indonesia-1 twin towers, currently under construction.

== Shopping mall tenants ==
Plaza Indonesia has seven floors for retails, with total of nine floors, combined with the basement levels. There is also a multi-purpose ballroom at the second floor. The following are the tenants by floor and category as of July 2025:

- Basement: The Foodhall Gourment, Periplus Bookstore, and restaurants
- 1st floor, dedicated for luxury fashion and F&B brands: Bulgari, Celine, Ferragamo, Givenchy, Louis Vuitton, Godiva Chocolatier and Venchi
- 2nd floor, international mid-class brands: Calvin Klein, H&M, Marks & Spencer and Zara. A multifunction ballroom is also in this floor.
- 3rd floor, jewelry and children's needs
- 4th floor, dedicated for Indonesian local fashion boutiques and beauty saloons
- 5th floor, dedicated for restaurants
- 6th floor, Cinema XXI multiplex with its single premium suite called The Premiere

== Gallery ==
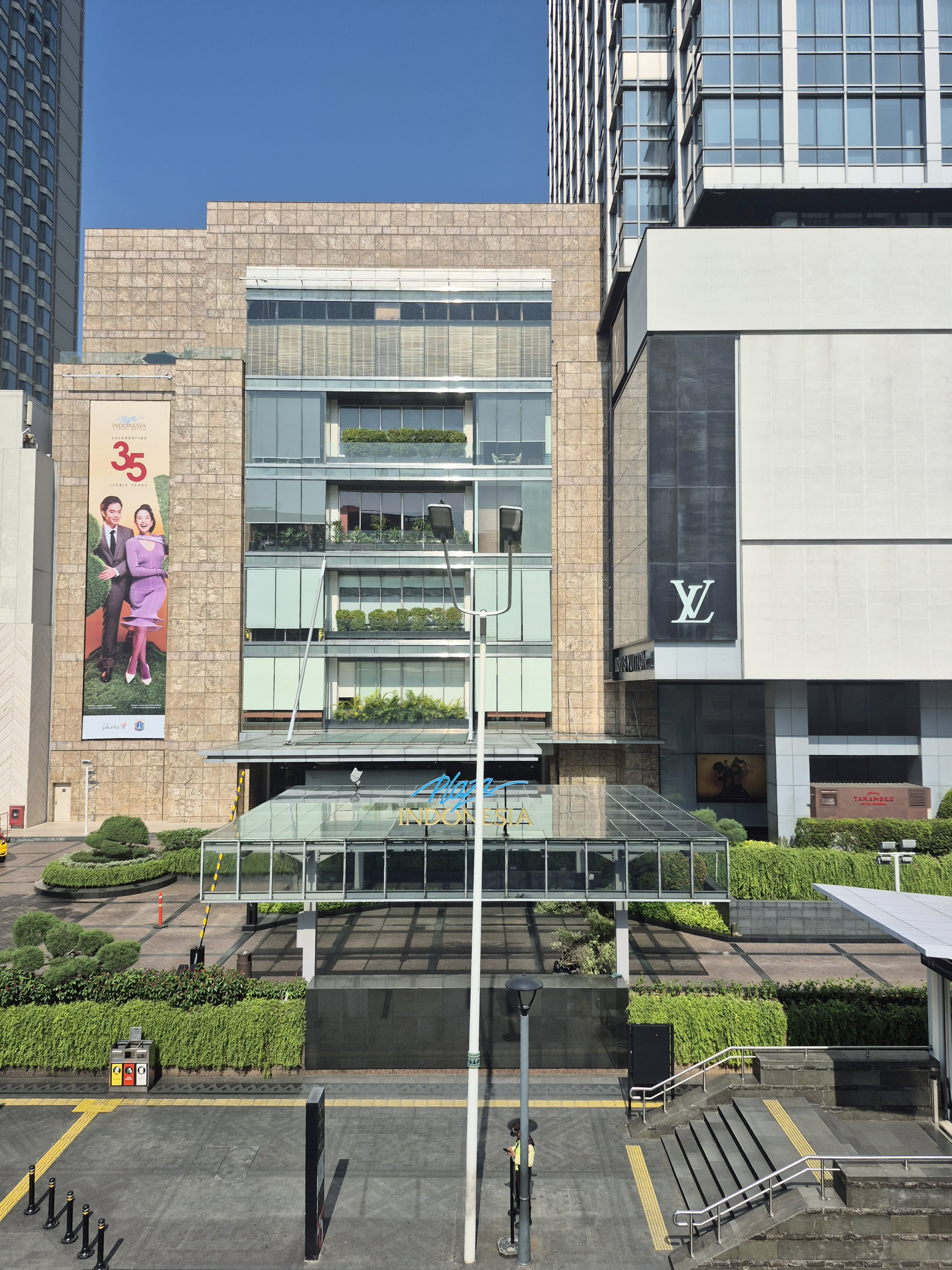
Exterior from Jalan M.H. Thamrin, 2025

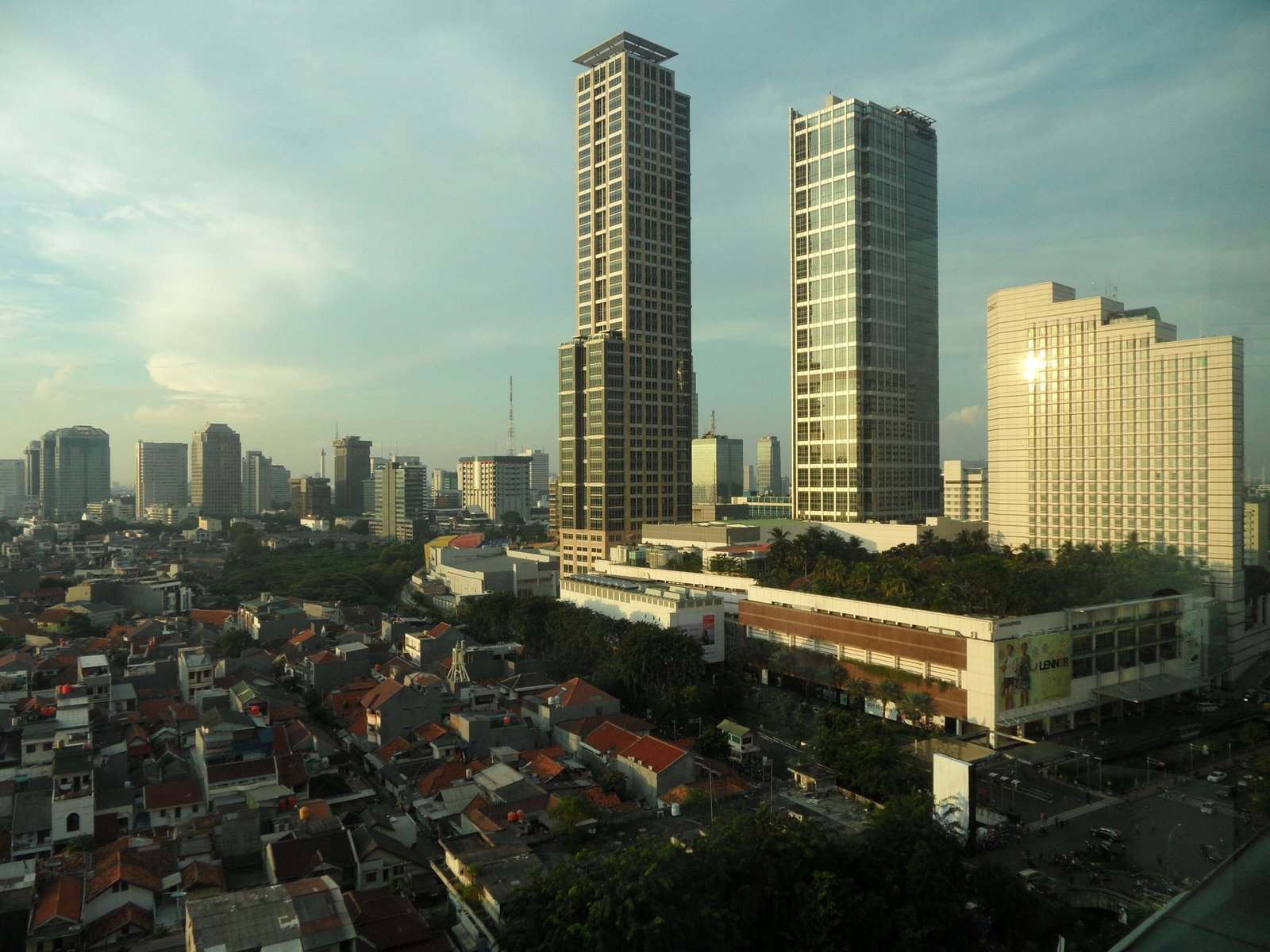
The complex seen from the neighboring Grand Indonesia mall, 2010

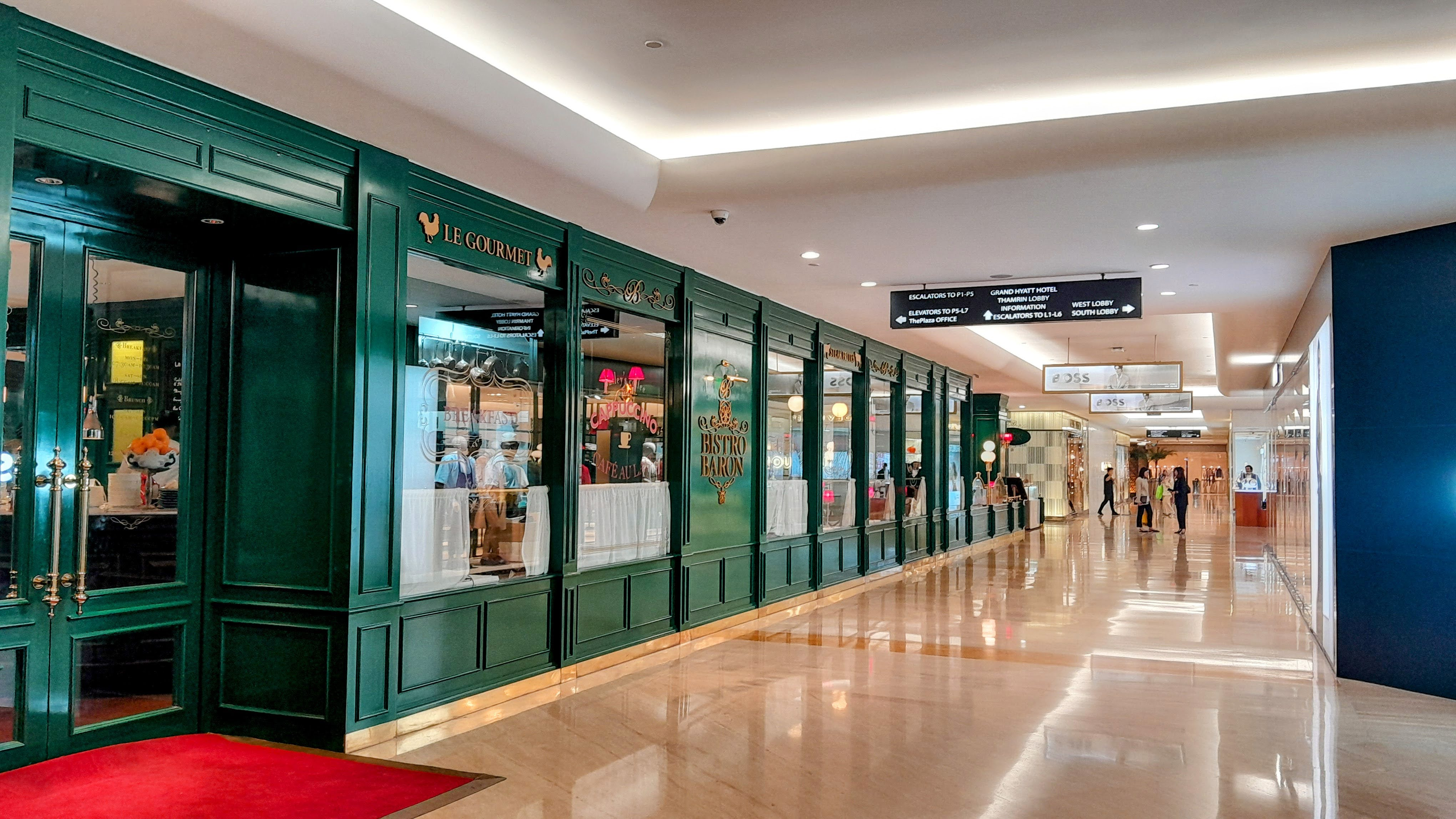
One of the tenants inside, 2024

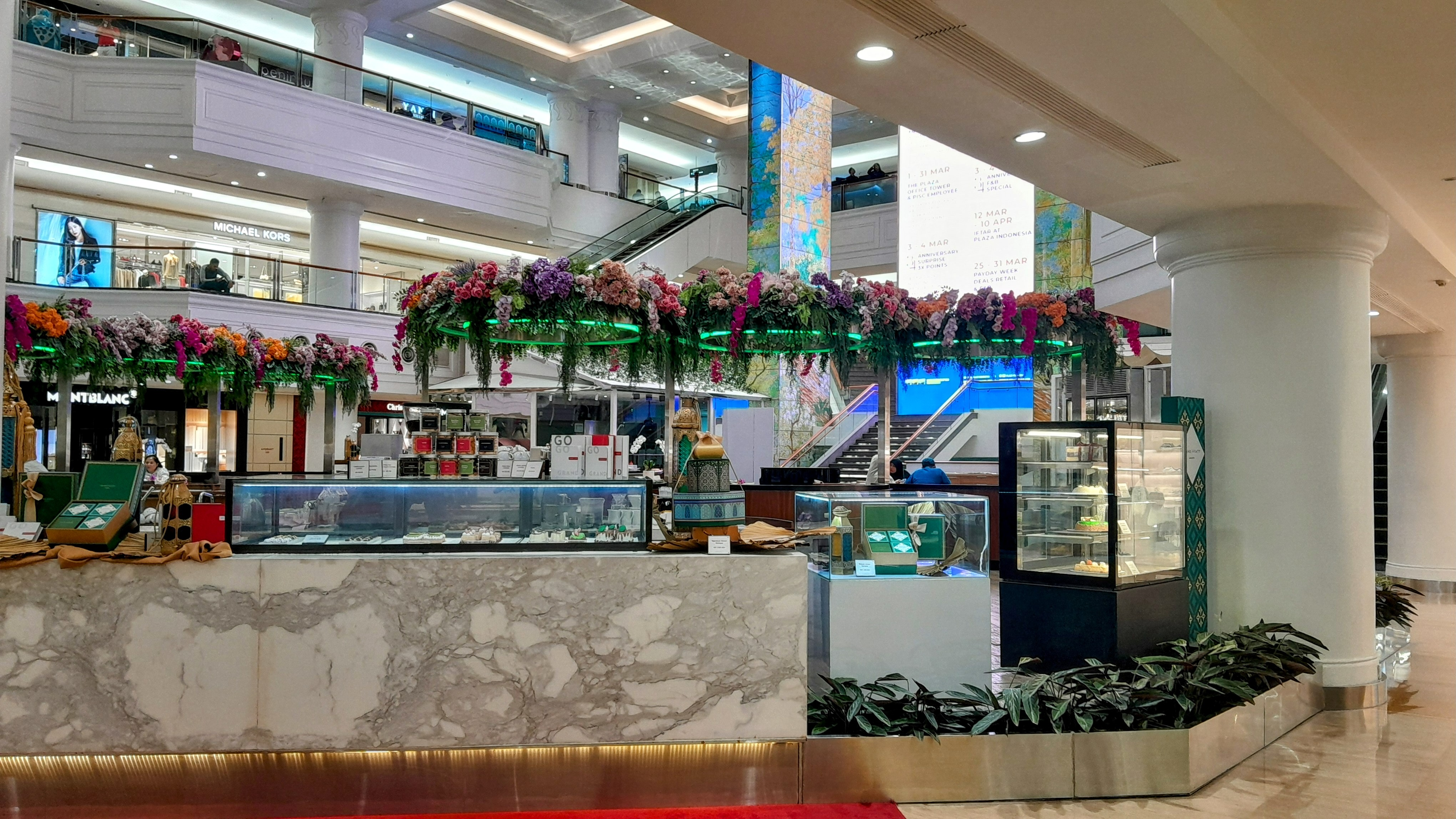
The La Moda dining place at the main atrium, 2024

== See also ==
- List of shopping malls in Indonesia
  - List of shopping malls in Jakarta
- List of tallest buildings in Jakarta
