= Achmad Djumiril =

Indonesian diplomat (1923–2001)

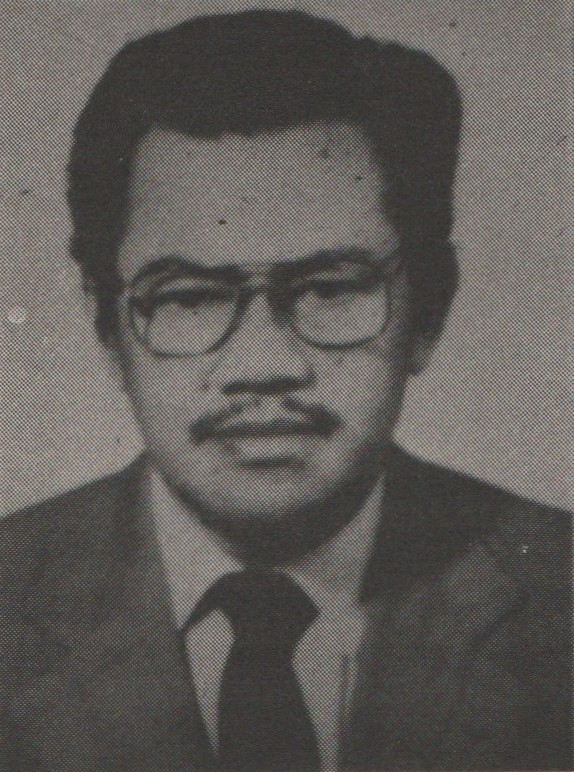

Indonesian Ambassador to Egypt, Djibouti, Somalia, and Sudan
- In office 16 June 1986 – January 1990
- President: Suharto
- Preceded by: Barkah Tirtadidjaja
- Succeeded by: Abdoerachman Djajaprawira

Director General for Protocol and Consular Affairs
- In office 3 April 1982 – 30 June 1986
- Preceded by: Joop Ave
- Succeeded by: Alex Rumamby

Indonesian Ambassador to Sweden
- In office 23 May 1979 – 1982
- President: Suharto
- Preceded by: Eri Soedewo
- Succeeded by: Alex Rumamby

Personal details
- Born: November 23, 1923 Bogor, Dutch East Indies
- Died: 5 November 2001 (aged 77)
- Spouse: Suaedah Kartahamidjaja
- Children: 4
- Education: Foreign Service Academy

Achmad Djumiril (23 November 1923 – 5 November 2001) was an Indonesian diplomat who served as ambassador to Sweden from 1979 to 1982 and to Egypt from 1986 to 1990. A graduate of the Foreign Service Academy, Achmad's posting included diplomatic missions in Cairo, Lisbon, West Berlin, and Manila. He had also served as the foreign ministry's director for protocol affairs and the director general for protocol and consular affairs.

== Diplomatic career ==
Born in Bogor on 23 November 1923, Achmad entered the Foreign Service Academy upon completing high school in 1949. He graduated from the academy and entered the foreign service in 1953. He received his first overseas posting a year later as an attaché at the embassy in Cairo. Achmad was later promoted to the rank of third secretary by 1957, and by 1958 he returned to the foreign ministry's office in Jakarta.

After about three years in Jakarta, Achmad was appointed as chargé d'affaires ad interim to the Indonesian legation in Lisbon on 15 July 1961. On 23 November 1964, he organized a cocktail party in celebration of the first GANEFO, which was held several months earlier. Due to pressures from the Non-Aligned Movement (NAM) summit in Cairo for NAM states to break diplomatic relations with Portugal, Indonesia formally severed bilateral relations with Portugal on 1 January 1965, although it maintained a consular presence at Portugal's colonial territories in Hong Kong and Dili. A week after the severance became effective, on 8 January Achmad hosted a farewell party attended by diplomatic representatives of various countries and businessmen. Achmad departed Lisbon for Jakarta on 28 February.

After three years of service in Jakarta, Achmad was sent as Indonesia's consul in West Berlin from 1968 to 1972. Achmad was then appointed as the foreign ministry's director for protocol affairs from 1972 to 1975, during which he took part in the foreign ministry's efficiency commission. On 12 November 1975, Achmad took on another overseas posting with his swearing in as the deputy chief of mission at the embassy in Manila.

On 23 May 1979, Achmad was sworn in as ambassador to Sweden. He presented his credentials to King Carl XVI Gustaf eight days later on 31 May. Following three years within the position, on 3 April 1982 Achmad assumed duties as the director general of protocol and consular affairs. As the chief of protocol, Achmad played a role in preparing high-level visits by foreign heads of state to Indonesia, including President of the U.S. Ronald Reagan's visit on the occasion of ASEAN Summit in Jakarta from April to May 1986. He was replaced by Alex Rumamby on 30 June 1986.

Achmad became Indonesia's ambassador to Egypt with concurrent accreditation to Djibouti, Somalia, and Sudan on 16 June 1986. In 1987, Achmad ordered the dissolution of several Indonesian student organizations in Egypt following their refusal to enshrine Pancasila in their statutes. Achmad's ambassadorial term ended in January 1990. Upon retiring, he received the Star of Service, 1st class from the Indonesian government on 7 August 1995. He died on 5 November 2001.

== Personal life ==
Achmad was married to Suaedah Kartahamidjaja. The couple has four children: Helwanurachman, Fafiadina, Bernardi, and Adriani.
