= Alip Pandoyo =

Indonesian army officer and politician (1937–2013)

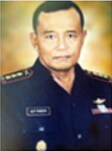

Speaker of Central Java Regional People's Representative Council
- In office 1997–1999
- Preceded by: Soeparto Tjitrodihardjo
- Succeeded by: Mardijo

Personal details
- Born: 13 July 1937 Klaten, Central Java, Dutch East Indies
- Died: 11 September 2013 (aged 76) Semarang, Central Java, Indonesia

Military service
- Allegiance: Indonesia
- Branch/service: Indonesian Army
- Years of service: 1962–199?
- Rank: Brigadier general
- Unit: Infantry

Alip Pandoyo (13 July 1937 – 11 September 2013) was an Indonesian army officer and politician who served as the chairman of Golkar in Central Java and the speaker of Central Java Regional People's Representative Council from 1997 until 1999. Before his involvement in politics, Pandoyo served in the army, with his last military office being the chief of staff of the Sulawesi regional military command.

== Early life and education ==
Alip was born on 13 July 1937 in Klaten. He attended the 3rd Yogyakarta State High School and entered the National Military Academy after finishing high school. He graduated from the academy in 1962 with the rank of second lieutenant.

== Military career ==
Alip began his military career as a platoon commander in the 712th Infantry Battalion in Manado. Shortly afterwards, he was promoted as a company commander. He was then transferred to Sangihe Talaud regency and became the chief of staff of the military district. During his time in Sangihe Talaud, Alip was entrusted to lead the local Golkar branch.

After serving in North Sulawesi, Alip returned to Java. Alip, who already held the rank of major, became the commander of the 324th Infantry Battalion in West Java. He commanded the battalion until it was dissolved in March 1975. He was then sent to pursue further military education at the Indonesian Army Command and General Staff College from 1975 until 1976. He briefly served as the education director at the army infantry center before studying again at the Joint Command and General Staff College from 1978 until 1979.

Following his military education in the command and staf colleges, Alip consecutively became assistant for operation in the South Sumatra (Sriwijaya) and Jakarta military regional command. The Tanjung Priok massacre, which involved soldiers from the Jakarta military regional command, happened during his time in Jakarta. Alip was investigated by the human rights commission for his alleged involvement in the massacre in 2000, but he was not found guilty.

In April 1985, Alip was appointed the commander of the Taroada Tarogau military area in Parepare. He led the military area for around two years until March 1987. He was then transferred to Yogyakarta and became the commander of the local military area until June 1988. The assistant for operations to the army chief of staff, I Putu Sukreta Suranta, appointed Alip as his deputy after his departure from Yogyakarta. Alip was then promoted to the rank of brigadier general in October 1988.

After three years serving in the army headquarters as deputy assistant for operations, on 15 January 1991 Alip was appointed the chief of staff of the Wirabuana Military Regional Command, which covers the Sulawesi island. He left this position on 3 September 1992 and retired from the military several years later.

== Political career ==
Alip began his involvement in politics after his retirement. He was appointed the chairman of Golkar in Central Java in 1993 for a five-year term. Alip became the speaker of the Central Java Regional People's Representative Council in 1997. On the same year, his daughter Liliek Herawati became a member of the People's Representative Council from Central Java. As the anti-Suharto movement began to grow larger during that time, Alip was accused of nepotism by the anti-regime demonstrators. He eventually conceded and ordered his daughter to resign in 1998. He himself became sympathetic to the movement and began demanding Harmoko, the pro-Suharto Golkar leader, to resign from his position. Alip's term as speaker ended in 1999.

== Personal life ==
Alip was married to Sri Suryaningsih and had four children.

Alip died due to heart complications at the Telogorejo Hospital in Semarang on 11 September 2013. His body was buried at the Mount Carmel Memorial Park the day after.
