= Susilo Sudarman =

Indonesian politician

General Susilo Sudarman
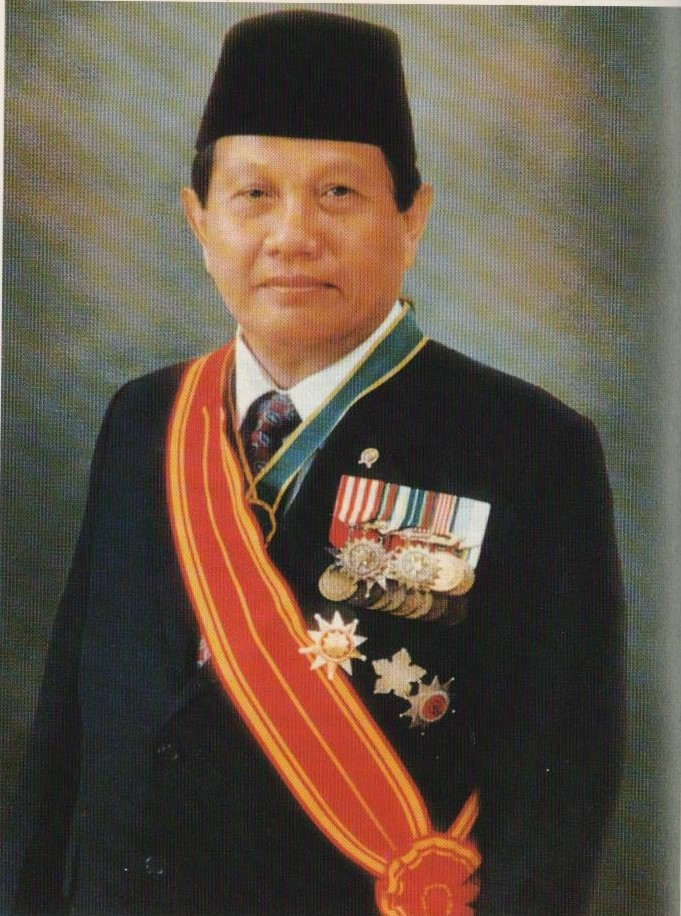

4th Coordinating Minister for Political, Legal and Security Affairs
- In office 17 March 1993 – 18 December 1997
- President: Suharto
- Preceded by: Sudomo
- Succeeded by: Feisal Tanjung

3rd Minister of Tourism, Post and Telecommunications
- In office 21 March 1988 – 17 March 1993
- President: Suharto
- Preceded by: Achmad Tahir
- Succeeded by: Joop Ave

11th Indonesian Ambassador to the United States
- In office 1986–1988
- President: Suharto
- Preceded by: Hasnan A. Habib
- Succeeded by: Abdul Rahman Ramly

Personal details
- Born: 12 November 1928 Cilacap, Dutch East Indies
- Died: 18 December 1997 (aged 69) Jakarta, Indonesia
- Cause of death: Heart Swelling
- Party: Golongan Karya
- Spouse: Widaningsri
- Relations: Mayjen TNI (Purn.) Muhammad Mangundiprojo (Father in law); Himawan Sutanto (Brother in Law)
- Children: Indroyono Soesilo
- Education: Indonesian Military Academy Angkatan I (1948)

Military service
- Allegiance: Indonesia
- Branch/service: Indonesian Army
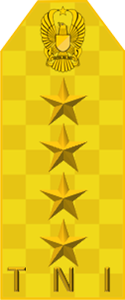
- Rank: General
- Unit: Cavalry

Soesilo Soedarman (EYD: Susilo Sudarman) (10 November 1928 – 18 December 1997) was the Coordinating Minister for Political, Legal and Security Affairs at the Fourth Development Cabinet (1993–1998) and the Minister of Tourism, Post and Telecommunications at the Fifth Development Cabinet (1988–1993). Serving as the Indonesian Ambassador to the United States, in Washington, D.C from 18 February 1986 to 11 April 1988 and Member of the People's Consultative Assembly representing Golongan Karya for the Constituency of North Sumatra until his death.

== Profile ==
=== Early life ===
Soesilo was born the second of eleven children on 10 November 1928 in Maos, Cilacap with the name Soemarlan. When he was weaned, he was then cared for by his grandfather who changed his name to Soesilo. Soesilo's grandfather was a wealthy landlord, at the time of his birth, he received several gifts from his grandfather in the form of land of around 100 bau (70 hectares) and a sum of 10 thousand gulden. The prize was intended so that Soesilo would be able to go to medical school to become a doctor because Soesilo's grandfather had a personal doctor named Doctor Katung, and wanted his grandson to become a doctor. However, during the Japanese occupation, his grandfather was subject to land reform regulations, and eventually fell into poverty.

==== Name ====
Since his childhood, his name was only the mononym Soesilo. When Soesilo became an ambassador in United States someone asked for Soesilo's surname, Soesilo replied that he didn't have one, but the questioner said that he should have surname and Soesilo then gave the name Soedarman which was the name of his father (Soedarman Wiryosoedarmo). On the next occasion, Soesilo was then called by the name Mr. Soedarman.

=== Military career ===
After graduating from High School in Yogyakarta, he then continued his education at the Indonesian Military Academy, deviating from his grandfather's wish on becoming a doctor. At the Military Academy he was a classmates with Subroto (future Minister of Mines and Energy) and Sayidiman Suryohadiprojo (future Indonesian Ambassador to Japan). Graduating from the academy, as one of its top graduates, he was obliged to become an instructor. He was tasked in student mobilization during the Indonesian Revolution, and with training students at the Middle and High school levels when Dutch troops reached Gombong, Kebumen. He served as Commander of the Regional Military Command (Pangkowilhan) of Sumatra and West Kalimantan from 1980 to 1985.

== Personal life ==
He was married to Widaningsri Putri daughter of Major General Muhammad Mangundiprojo and the younger brother of Lieutenant General Himawan Soetanto, they knew each other since he was a cadet of the Military Academy. The wedding took place in Ponorogo, 15 April 1951. They had 5 children, 1 daughter and 4 sons.

Soesilo Soedarman died on 18 December 1997, at the age of 69 years at Harapan Kita Hospital, Jakarta for the heart swelling his illness was already suffered at October. Soesilo Soedarman's body was buried at the Kalibata Heroes' Cemetery.
