= Soepardjo Rustam =

Indonesian politician and diplomat (1926–1993)

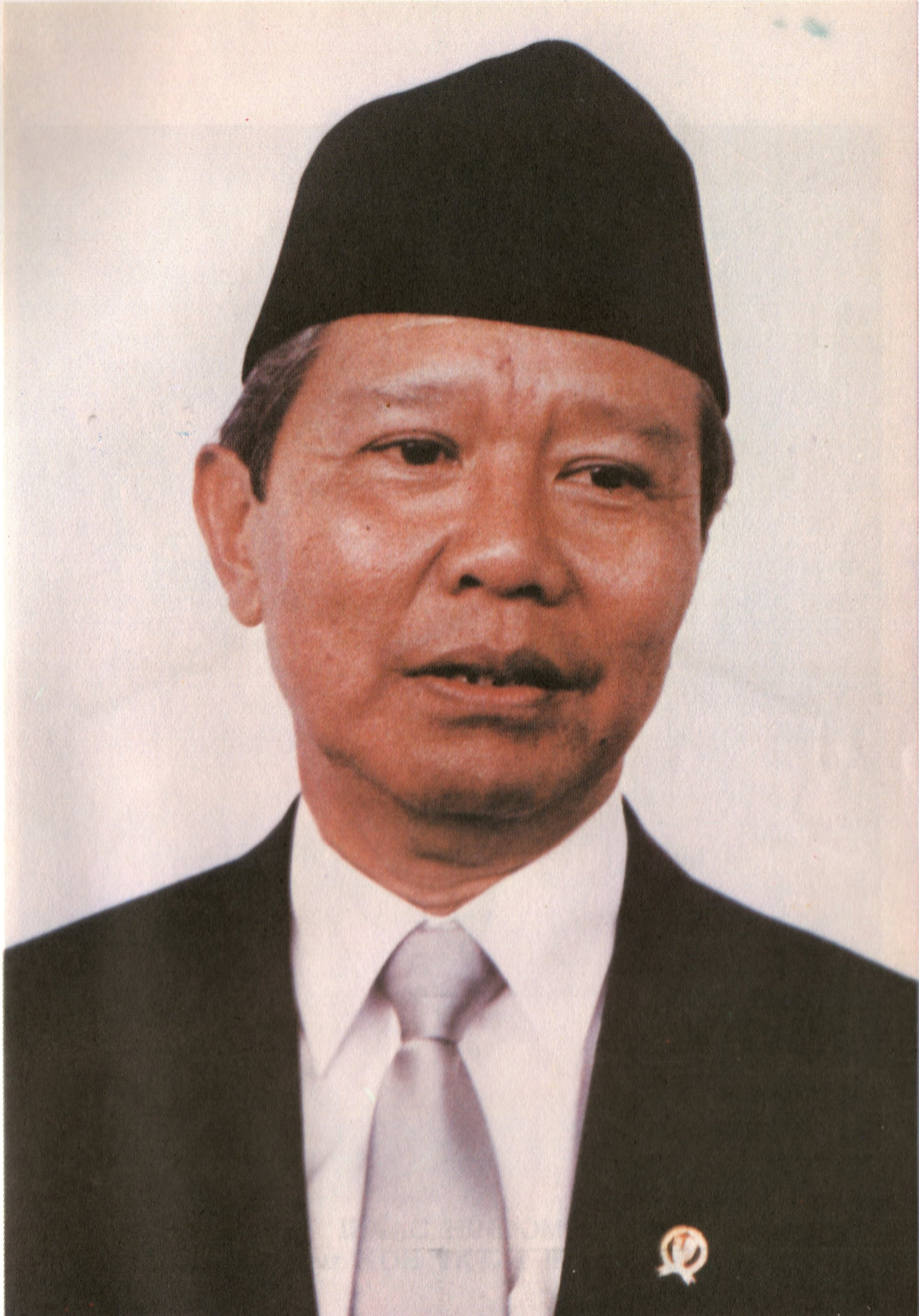
- Rustam, c. 1986

Coordinating Minister of People's Welfare
- In office 23 March 1988 – 17 March 1993
- Preceded by: Alamsyah Ratu Perwiranegara
- Succeeded by: Azwar Anas

Minister of Home Affairs
- In office 19 March 1983 – 23 March 1988
- Preceded by: Amir Machmud
- Succeeded by: Rudini

Governor of Central Java
- In office 28 December 1974 – 1983
- Deputy: Sukardjan Hadisutikno
- Preceded by: Moenadi
- Succeeded by: Muhammad Ismail

Personal details
- Born: 12 August 1926 Banyumas, Dutch East Indies
- Died: 11 April 1993 (aged 66) Jakarta, Indonesia

Military service
- Allegiance: Indonesia
- Branch/service: Indonesian Army
- Rank: Lieutenant general

Soepardjo Rustam (12 August 1926 – 11 April 1993) was an Indonesian military officer, politician and diplomat. He served in a number of government positions, including as the Coordinating Minister of People's Welfare (1988–1993), Minister of Home Affairs (1983–1988), and as governor of Central Java (1974–1983).

Joining the Indonesian Army during the Indonesian National Revolution, Rustam served as adjutant to armed forces commander Sudirman. After the war, he was sent abroad as military attaches in the Netherlands and Malaysia, and he aided in maintaining relations between Indonesia and Malaysia during the confrontation period. During the Suharto era, he was posted as ambassador to Yugoslavia and Malaysia, then served as governor of Central Java before becoming a central government minister until shortly before his death.

== Early life ==
Soepardjo Rustam was born on 12 August 1926 in the village of Sokaraja, in what is today Banyumas Regency of Central Java. He graduated from a Hollandsch-Inlandsche School (colonial elementary school), and later the colonial middle school (Meer Uitgebreid Lager Onderwijs). During the Japanese occupation of the Dutch East Indies, at the age of 18, he joined the Japanese-backed Defenders of the Homeland militia organization.

== Career ==
=== Revolution and diplomacy ===
During the Indonesian National Revolution, Rustam became an adjutant to Indonesian Armed Forces Commander Sudirman, along with Tjokropranolo. Tjokropranolo, in writing Sudirman's biography, credited Rustam with a plot to distract Dutch attempts to capture Sudirman. Rustam split off from Sudirman's entourage and instead guarded a double, pulling away attention from the real Sudirman who continued to command Indonesian guerilla warfare.

Rustam remained in the army after the end of the revolution. After Sudirman's death, he became adjutant to Armed Forces Chief of Staff Tahi Bonar Simatupang for a year. In 1952, he was assigned to become Indonesia's military attache in the Netherlands. After this overseas posting, he became a staff officer at the army headquarters and led an army school before once more being posted abroad in 1959, this time as a military attache in Kuala Lumpur. Upon his return, he became an assistant to the army minister.

During the Indonesia–Malaysia confrontation, due to his prior experience in Kuala Lumpur, Rustam assisted a secret effort by the Indonesian Army to maintain some relations with the Malaysian government, without the knowledge of the foreign ministry. This effort sought to find a compromise which would allow Sukarno to back down while saving face. Following the fall of Sukarno, this effort allowed Indonesia–Malaysia relations to normalize quickly. Early in Suharto's presidency, Rustam first became the Director for Asia Pacific Affairs in the foreign ministry, before becoming ambassador to Yugoslavia in 1971 and to Malaysia in 1972. During this period, he assisted the new foreign minister Adam Malik in preparing the groundwork for the Association of Southeast Asian Nations.

=== Government career ===
On 28 December 1974, at that time holding the rank of major general, Rustam was appointed as the acting Governor of Central Java. Following a legislature vote on 17 April 1975, he became the full governor. He was sworn in for a second term on 4 June 1980, having been promoted to lieutenant general.

In the middle of his second term, Rustam was appointed as Minister of Home Affairs in the Fourth Development Cabinet, and was sworn in on 19 March 1983. In contrast to his predecessor Amir Machmud, who had significantly centralized the governance of the country, Rustam adopted a more decentralized view. According to contemporary East Nusa Tenggara governor Ben Mboi, Rustam made studies regarding a federal government system. Rustam had also ordered a review into a law on village governance passed during Machmud's ministership. This interest in decentralization apparently continued until his death. The primary opposition party during Suharto's era, the Indonesian Democratic Party, encountered a organizational deadlock in its 1986 congress. The congress eventually opted to leave the selection of its leader to Rustam, and he appointed the government-approved candidate Suryadi to become the new party leader. Rustam became the Coordinating Minister for People's Welfare in the Fifth Development Cabinet, starting on 23 March 1988 and serving until 17 March 1993.

== Death ==
Rustam died on 11 April 1993 at the Metropolitan Medical Center in South Jakarta due to his illness. He was buried the following day in a military ceremony at the Kalibata Heroes' Cemetery.
