= Feisal Tanjung =

Indonesian general (1939–2013)

General (Ret.) Feisal Tanjung
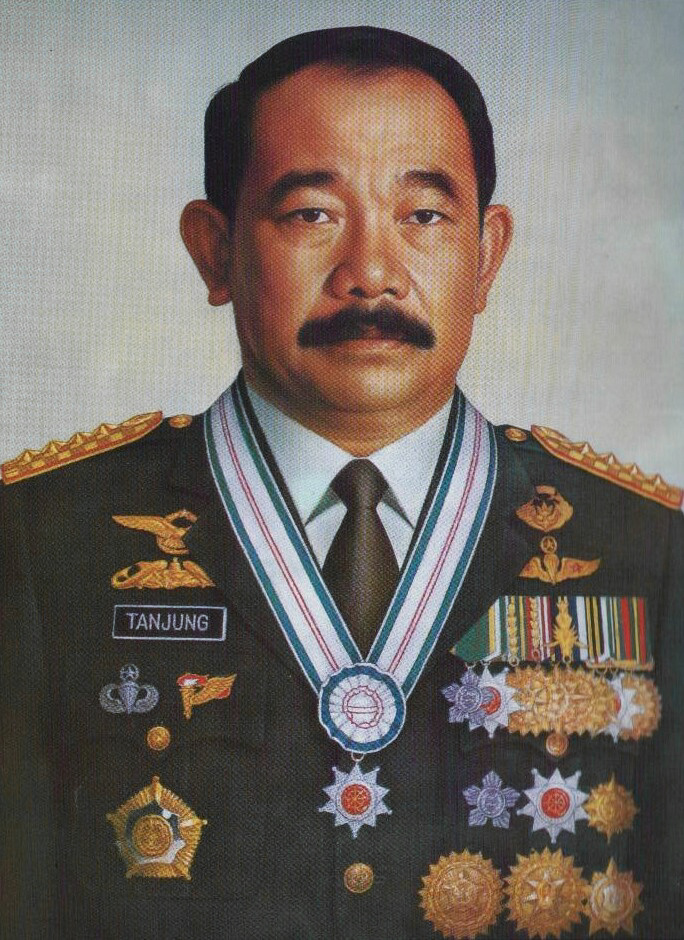
- Official portrait, 1995

5th Coordinating Minister for Political, Legal, and Security Affairs
- In office 14 March 1998 – 20 October 1999
- President: Suharto; B. J. Habibie
- Preceded by: Susilo Sudarman
- Succeeded by: Wiranto

11th Commander of the Armed Forces of the Republic of Indonesia
- In office 21 May 1993 – 12 February 1998
- President: Suharto
- Preceded by: General Edi Sudradjat
- Succeeded by: General Wiranto

Personal details
- Born: Feisal Edno Tanjung; 17 June 1939 Tapanoeli, Dutch East Indies
- Died: 18 February 2013 (aged 73) Jakarta, Indonesia
- Party: Independent
- Spouse: Masrowida Lubis
- Education: Indonesian Military Academy
- Occupation: Army officer; politician
- Awards: ICSA Awards 2008

Military service
- Allegiance: Indonesia
- Branch/service: Indonesian Army
- Years of service: 1961–1998
- Rank: General
- Unit: Infantry (Kopassus)
- Commands: Indonesian Armed Forces
- Battles/wars: Operation Masohi; Operation Trikora; Operation Dwikora; Indonesian mass kilings; Operation Security and Order; Insurgency in Papua; Act of Free Choice; Garuda Contingent IV; Operation Lotus
- Service no.: 18803

General Feisal Edno Tanjung (17 June 1939 – 18 February 2013), known as Feisal Tanjung, was an Indonesian Army general who was ABRI Commander (from 21 May 1993 to 12 February 1998) and also served as Coordinating Minister for Politics and Security of the Republic of Indonesia. He had experience in combat, territorial and education. Much of his career was spent in special forces, Sandhi Yudha RPKAD Group (Kopassus) and later at the Kostrad 17th Airborne Infantry Brigade.

== Early life ==
He was born in Tarutung, North Tapanuli, North Sumatra, Indonesia (then Dutch East Indies) on 17 June 1939. He was the 5th son of 10 brothers from the couple Amin Husin Abdul Mun'im Tanjung and Siti Rawani Hutagalung. The middle name "Edno" in the name is adjusted to the order of birth (E is the 5th letter of the alphabet). He was a Batak by ethnicity with Muslim religious faith.

== Career ==
Feisal Tanjung had served in ABRI after graduating from the National Military Academy in 1961. After serving at the Pattimura Military Command, he served in the Army Regiment Command (RPKAD). In the 1960s, the name Tanjung Company was a legendary company'. He was involved in the cleansing of the PKI in Java and had led Operation Lembah X in Papua. His career was spent in Kostrad, RPKAD (now Kopassus), then the Infantry Armament Center. He was once Commander of the Kodam in Kalimantan (Tanjungpura). From Tanjungpura, Feisal Tanjung was later appointed Commander of Seskoad in 1988 and has long held that position. Feisal Tanjung held the rank of major general for 7 years.

The name of the Seskoad Commander Maj. Gen. Feisal Tanjung began to become a hot discussion after becoming the DKM (Military Honorary Council) for the Santa Cruz massacre in Timor Leste in 1991. President Soeharto's appointment of Feisal Tanjung at that time surprised many people because at that time the Army Chief of Staff Edi Sudrajat did not recommend his name as a candidate for the DKM chairman. The most tangible results of the DKM recommendations were the removal of General Maj. Gen. Sintong Panjaitan - one of the officers who shined at that time - from the post of Udayana Military Commander. In addition, Brigadier General Rudolf Warouw was also dismissed from the Commander of the East Timor Operations Command with Captain Choki Aritonang and several of his subordinates as executing officers in the field. Everything was removed as a reaction of the government was adopting international demands for the responsibility for riots in Santa Cruz, East Timor which tarnished the image of the Republic of Indonesia at that time. While serving as Commander of the Armed Forces, there was friction between the stronghold of General TNI Feisal Tanjung and the stronghold of TNI General R. Hartono (KSAD), as well as rumors of the classification of ABRI Hijau and ABRI Merah Putih.

Feisal Tanjung served in many positions in the military before serving as cabinet member,

- Platoon Commander (Danton) 1 Company 2 Kodam XV / Pattimura
- Company Commander (Danki) Tanjung Battalion 2 RPKAD
- Commander of RPKAD Group I
- Lecturer in the 1972 Army Staff and Command School
- Chief of Staff of the Kostrad 17th Airborne Infantry Brigade
- Commander of the Kostrad 17th Airborne Infantry Brigade (Danbrigif Linud)
- Assistant Chief Operating Officer (Asops Kas) Kostrad
- Chief of Staff of the Kostrad Airborne Combat Command (Kaskopur Linud)
- Commander of the Airborne Combat Command (Pangkopur Linud) Kostrad ( 1st Infantry Division / Kostrad ) 1981–1983
- Commander of Infantry Center (Danpusenif) AD 1983–1985
- Commander of Regional Military Command (Pangdam) VI / Tanjungpura 1985–1988
- Commander of the Army (And Seskoad) Staff and Command School 1988–1992
- Head of ABRI General Staff (Kasum) 1992–1993
- Commander of the Republic of Indonesia Armed Forces 1993–1998
- Coordinating Minister for Politics and Security (Menkopolkam) in the VII Development Cabinet working period March 14, 1998 - May 21, 1998
- Coordinating Minister for Politics and Security (Menkopolkam) in the Development Reform Cabinet working period May 21, 1998 - October 20, 1999.

== ABRI Commander ==
Feisal Tanjung, who at that time was the Head of ABRI's General Staff (Kasum), had not previously been predicted as a candidate for the Commander of the Indonesian Armed Forces, considering that at that time there was another strong candidate, TNI General Wismoyo Arismunandar who was then serving as Army Chief of Staff (KSAD). Feisal Tanjung is an ABRI officer who holds the highest position without going through the KSAD level. Previously, TNI General LB Moerdani also drove to the position of ABRI Commander without going through the KSAD position, but from the position of Defense and Intelligence Assistant / ABRI / Kopkamtib concurrently Deputy Head of BAKIN.

== Family life ==
Feisal Tanjung was married to Dr. Masrowida Lubis. They had three children, Astrid Tanjung, Yasser Tanjung, and Yusuf Tanjung. He died on Monday 18 February 2013 in Jakarta and was buried in the Kalibata Heroes' Cemetery.

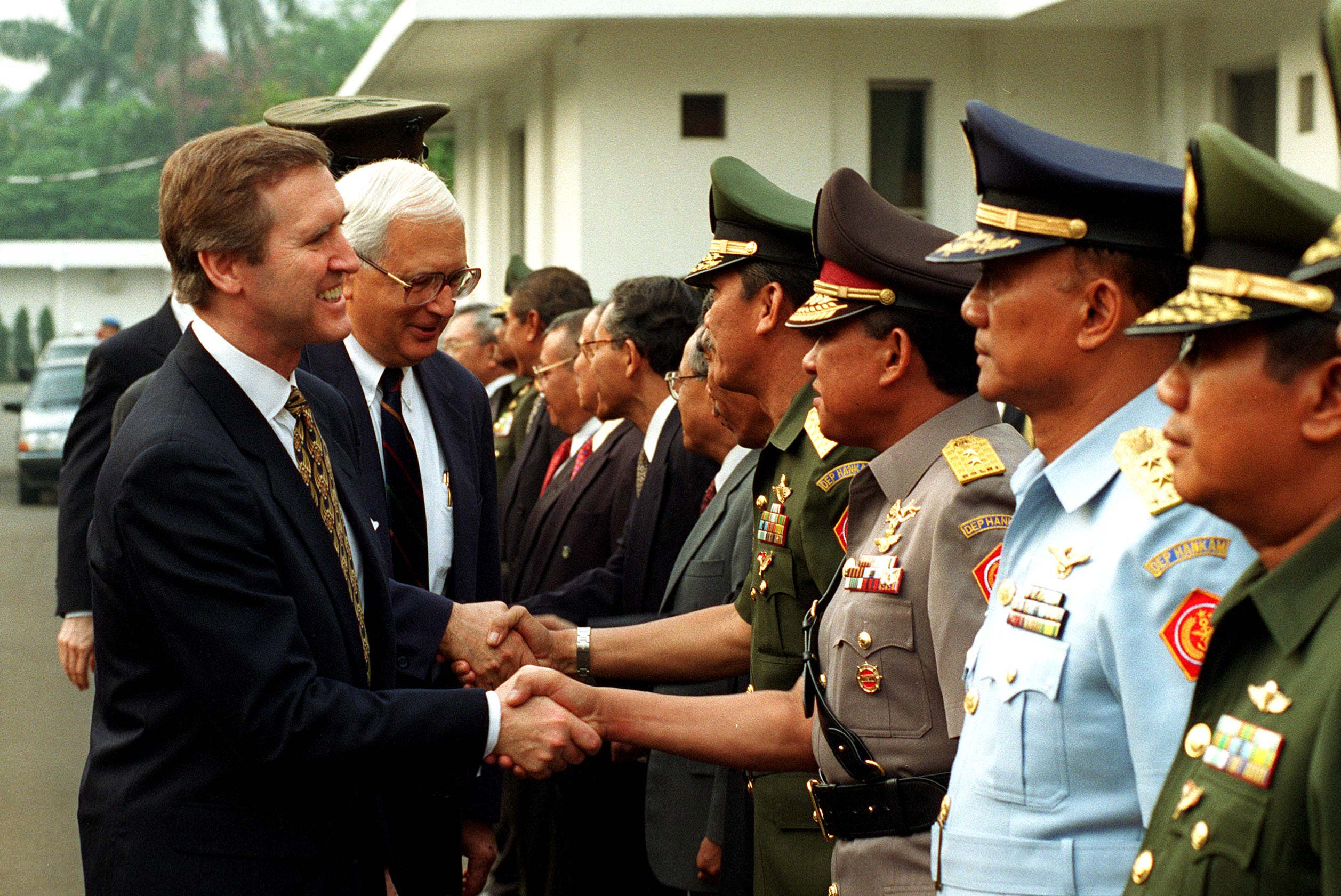
Feisal Tanjung shaking hand with visiting Defense Secretary of USA William Cohen

== Honours ==
=== National ===
- Star of the Republic of Indonesia (3rd Class) (Indonesian: Bintang Republik Indonesia Utama) (1998)
- Star of Mahaputera (2nd Class) (Indonesian: Bintang Mahaputera Adipradana) (1995)

=== Foreign honours ===
- Brunei:
  - First Class of the Order of Paduka Keberanian Laila Terbilang (DPKT) (1995) - Dato Paduka Seri
- Cambodia:
  - Grand Cross of the Royal Order of Sahametrei (1994)
- Malaysia:
  - Honorary Commander of the Order of Loyalty to the Crown of Malaysia (PSM) (1994) - Tan Sri
  - Courageous Commander of the Most Gallant Order of Military Service (PGAT) (1994)
  - Warrior of the Most Gallant Order of Military Service (PAT) (1986)
- Netherlands:
  - Knight Grand Cross of the Order of Orange-Nassau (1995)
- Pakistan:
  - Nishan-e-Imtiaz (1993)
- Singapore:
  - Recipient of the Darjah Utama Bakti Cemerlang (Tentera) (DUBC) (1994)
- South Korea:
  - Tongil Medal of the Order of National Security Merit, 1st Class (1995)
- Spain:
  - Grand Cross with White Decoration of the Order of Military Merit (1995)
- Thailand:
  - Knight Grand Cross (First Class) of the Most Exalted Order of the White Elephant (KCE) (1996)
- United States:
  - Commander of the Legion of Merit (1995)

Political offices
Preceded by Susilo Sudarman	Coordinating Minister for Political, Legal, and Security Affairs; 1998–1999	Succeeded by Wiranto
Military offices
Preceded by Edi Sudradjat	Commander of the Indonesian Armed Forces; 1993–1998	Succeeded by Wiranto
