= Sukardjan Hadisutikno =

Indonesian academician and politician

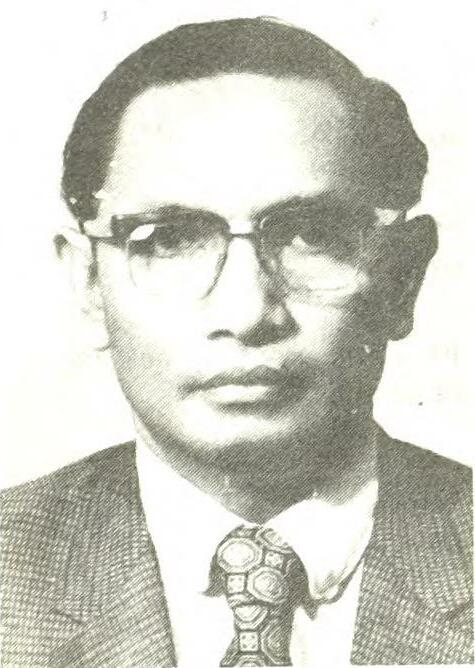

Vice Governor of Central Java
- In office 7 October 1981 – 1987 Serving with Soeparto Tjitrodihardjo (1985-1987)
- Preceded by: Sujono Atmo (1965)
- Succeeded by: Soenartedjo

Deputy Speaker of the Central Java Regional People's Representative Council
- In office 1971–1977

Member of the Central Java Regional People's Representative Council
- In office 1971 – 7 October 1981

Personal details
- Born: December 10, 1925 Madiun, East Java, Dutch East Indies
- Died: November 11, 2001 (aged 75) Semarang, Central Java, Indonesia
- Party: Golkar
- Spouse(s): Tugiyah (died 1982) Generoosa Goenarsi
- Children: 4 (1 from Tugiyah and 3 from Goenarsi)
- Education: Gadjah Mada University (Drs.); Diponegoro University (Prof.)

Sukardjan Hadisutikno (10 December 1925 – 11 November 2001) was an Indonesian political scientist and politician. He was the dean of the Faculty of Social and Political Science at the Diponegoro University from 1969 until 1975, the Deputy Speaker of the Central Java Regional People's Representative Council from 1971 until 1977, and the Vice Governor of Central Java from 1981 until 1987.

== Education and academic career ==
Hadisutikno was born on 10 December 1925, in Paron, a small village in Ngawi, East Java. His father, Hardjodikromo, was the village's chief. He left the village at the age of 11 to pursue primary education at the Ardjoena Hollandsch-Inlandsche School (primary school) in Bandung, West Java. He completed his primary education in 1940 and continued at the Bandung Meer Uitgebreid Lager Onderwijs until he graduated in 1944. He then moved to Surakarta in Central Java and completed his high school education there in 1947.

Upon completing basic education, Hadisutikno began teaching in several schools around Central Java. He was then sent to study politics at the Gadjah Mada University. He graduated from the university with a doctorandus in 1960 and began teaching politics at the Diponegoro University, which at that time was the only university in Central Java. In 1962, Sukardjan was appointed by the Rector of the Diponegoro University to form a separate faculty for social and political science. The faculty was formed in 1968 and Hadisutikno became its first dean until 1975.

On 26 July 1990, Hadisutikno was appointed a full professor in politics in the Diponegoro University. His inaugural speech, titled The Aspect of Democracy in Village Decision Making and Policy Execution, criticizes the authoritarian nature of village governance in Indonesia. Sukardjan argued that the structure of village government should be re-evaluated and that village institutions should be given more authority during the process of decision making and policy execution.

== Political career ==
Hadisutikno joined Golkar, the government's party, in 1970, and was elected as a member of Central Java Regional People's Representative Council in the 1971 Indonesian legislative election. He became the council's deputy speaker and was appointed Central Java's regional delegate to the People's Consultative Assembly. He retained his membership in the next election. In March 1980, Hadisutikno was named as a possible candidate to replace Governor of Central Java Soepardjo Roestam, but he was not nominated and Soepardjo Roestam was re-elected for a second term.

Hadisutikno was nominated as Soepardjo Roestam's deputy in early August 1981. The post had been empty for about fifteen years after the arrest of the previous officeholder, Sujono Atmo, in 1965. Hadisutikno's nomination was approved by the Central Java Regional People's Representative Council on 14 August and he was installed on 7 October.

== Personal life ==
Hadisutikno was married to Tugiyah Soekardjan. The marriage resulted in a son. Tugiyah Soekardjan died on 24 March 1982 and Hadisutikno married again to Generoosa Goenarsi, his former student in the Diponegoro University. His second marriage to Goenarsi resulted in three children.

Hadisutikno died on the morning of 11 November 2001 at the Elisabeth Hospital in Semarang. His body was interred at the Bergota Public Cemetery.
