= Operation Security and Order =

1967 raid in Indonesia

Date	5 March 1967
Location	Blora Regency, Central Java, Indonesia
Result	Indonesian military victory

Belligerents
Indonesia; ABRI	Mbah Suro's hermitage armed forces

Commanders and leaders
(Indonesia) Srinardi (Indonesia) Feisal Tanjung	Mbah Suro †

Units involved
IV Military Regional Command/Diponegoro; V Military Regional Command/Brawijaya; RPKAD	Banteng Wulung; Banteng Sarinah

Strength
Unknown	235 personnel

Casualties and losses
3 killed 2 injured	More than 100 killed; 2,000 arrested

Operation Security and Order (Indonesian: Operasi Keamanan dan Ketertiban, often abbreviated Operasi Kamtib) was a military operation carried out by the Indonesian Armed Forces (ABRI) against Mbah Suro's hermitage militia in Nginggil on 5 March 1967. This one-day military operation was won by ABRI forces, and they succeeded in destroying the hermitage.

== Background ==
After the 30 September Movement, many members of the Communist Party of Indonesia (PKI), as well as several ABRI personnel from East Java, fled to Mbah Suro's hermitage in Nginggil to avoid being arrested by the government. Mbah Suro's followers continued to grow in number. In 1966, the Blora Attorney estimated that the number of Mbah Suro's followers had reached 500,000 people.

Mbah Suro often gave speeches to his followers about the prophecy of the coming of the ratu adil (just king) and instructed them to chant slogans such as "Long live Mbah Suro" and "Long live Sukarno." His speeches led the New Order authorities to begin monitoring his activities starting in 1966. To prepare for an attack from the New Order government, Mbah Suro formed a hermitage armed forces consisting of two battalions: Banteng Wulung and Banteng Sarinah. Banteng Wulung had 200 personnel, while Banteng Sarinah was composed of 35 women.

The Commander of the IV Military Regional Command/Diponegoro (Kodam Diponegoro) had requested Mbah Suro to shut down his hermitage and also sent an envoy, Srinardi, to persuade him. The government made this effort four times. However, Mbah Suro rejected the request, and his followers assaulted the envoy from the Kodam Diponegoro.

In November 1966, the ABRI team for Operation Kalong successfully arrested an Islamic studies lecturer in Jakarta, Djaelani, who was attempting to gather remaining BTI cadres in Jakarta to launch a rebellion against the "feudal class". In his statement, he revealed that he had been instructed by a shadow PKI member from Ngawi named Ngabdu, who was living in Mbah Suro's hermitage, to gather the BTI cadres. From Djaelani's confession, it was uncovered that Mbah Suro's hermitage was harboring PKI members. Based on his testimony—along with Mbah Suro's refusal to comply with the orders of the Diponegoro Division Commander—ABRI began planning an attack on Nginggil, which they codenamed Operation Kamtib.

In planning Operation Kamtib in Nginggil, ABRI deployed troops from Battalions 408, 409, and 410, as well as RPKAD special forces. In addition, ABRI also mobilized support troops from Military Regional Command/Brawijaya which were the Military Area Command 0805/Ngawi and District Military Area Command 0813/Bojonegoro. The operation was led by Commander of District Military Command 0721, Major Srinardi. Meanwhile, Feisal Tanjung led the RPKAD forces.

== Operation ==
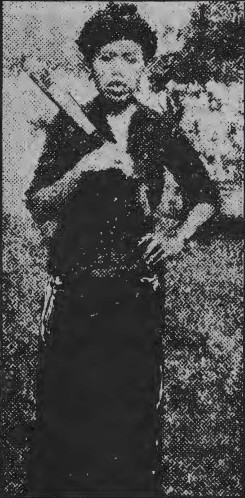
Tasmi, founder and mentor of Banteng Sarinah

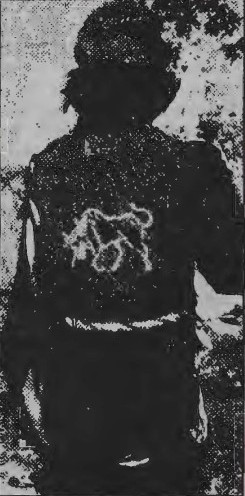
A member of Banteng Ulung who was arrested

At midnight on 5 March 1967, ABRI forces from Blora moved toward Nginggil. Upon arriving in Nginggil, ABRI units surrounded the village. One company from Battalion 408 and one platoon from Battalion 409 encircled the village from the Bengawan Solo River on the eastern side. Battalion 410 blocked access to Nginggil from the north, while RPKAD forces surrounded it from the west. The siege of Nginggil was also supported by territorial forces from Military Area Command 0805/Ngawi from the south and Military Area Command 0813/Bojonegoro from the east.

The ABRI attack was planned to begin at 5:00 AM. Fifteen minutes before the attack started, ABRI detonated plastic bombs in the hope that Mbah Suro and his followers would surrender. However, Mbah Suro's snipers, who were hiding in the dense forest, responded to the explosion by firing at the ABRI forces, thus inciting the battle.

During the battle, several RPKAD members managed to infiltrate Mbah Suro's hermitage without firing a single shot. Upon reaching the hermitage, the RPKAD troops engaged in hand-to-hand combat with Mbah Suro's fighters, who were armed with wooden clubs. In these duels, some RPKAD members fought Mbah Suro's followers with bare hands, while others used commando knives. They fought using judo and karate. Apart from that, the Banteng Wulung forces advanced to confront the RPKAD special forces and other units, despite being armed only with wooden clubs and headbands they waved, believing themselves to be invulnerable and spiritually powerful. While attacking the ABRI troops, they shouted slogans such as "Long live Mbah Suro," "Long live Sukarno," and "Long live the PKI." The battle and hand-to-hand combat, which lasted for hours, finally ended at 5:00 PM and ABRI won the battle.

ABRI lost three of its soldiers from the RPKAD unit: Sergeant Second Class Soerkarno, Corporal First Class Herdi, and Corporal First Class Darmanto. In addition, two ABRI troops were seriously injured. Meanwhile, more than 100 members of the Banteng Wulung and Banteng Sarinah forces were killed. The operation also resulted in the deaths of Mbah Suro and his wife, East Java PKI member Suradi, as well as other PKI members, Legi and Muljono. ABRI captured 2,000 of Mbah Suro's followers and brought them to Ngrawoh for interrogation.

After the battle, ABRI confiscated the hermitage's weaponry, which included a Vickers pistol, two Bren guns, three Chung rifles, one AK-47, one Sten gun, and a Colt pistol. They also burned down 113 houses to prevent Mbah Suro's followers from hiding, as well as Mbah Suro's meditation retreat.

== Post-operation ==
A day after Operation Kamtib, ABRI released the detainees who were not involved in the attack, allowing them to return to Nginggil. Those who were involved were taken to the Sub-Regional Command 073 headquarters in Salatiga for further investigation. The government also exhumed Mbah Suro's grave at the end of March 1967 to assure the public that Mbah Suro had indeed died, as well as for investigative purposes.

The government also arrested the remaining sympathizers of Mbah Suro in Surabaya in 1968. In addition, Mbah Suro's followers in Way Jepara were arrested in September 1967. In June 1970, the Central Java High Prosecutor's Office issued an order to suspend all hermitage activities related to Mbah Suro's sect in Nginggil and banned the dissemination of his teachings.

On April 8, 1967, the commander of Operation Security and Order, Srinardi, was appointed as the Regent of Blora, replacing R. Soekirno from the Indonesian National Party (PNI). In addition, he was promoted in rank from major to lieutenant colonel.

=== Nginggil ===
On March 8, the government appointed a police officer from Menden, Ngaisman, as the Village Head of Nginggil. In addition, the government also replaced all village officials and installed pro-government village apparatuses.

The government also restricted access to Nginggil Village for an extended period. They deployed troops from Battalion 408 to seal off the village from the outside world. Anyone wishing to enter Nginggil had to obtain written permission from the Governor of Central Java. In addition, Battalion 408 troops also monitored the movements of Nginggil residents.

== Bibliography ==
- Abdullah, Taufik; Abdurrachman, Sukri; Gunawan, Restu (2012). Malam Bencana 1965 Dalam Belitan Krisis Nasional: Bagian II Konflik Lokal. Jakarta: Yayasan Obor Indonesia.
