= Abdul Latief (Indonesian businessman) =

Indonesian businessman and politician

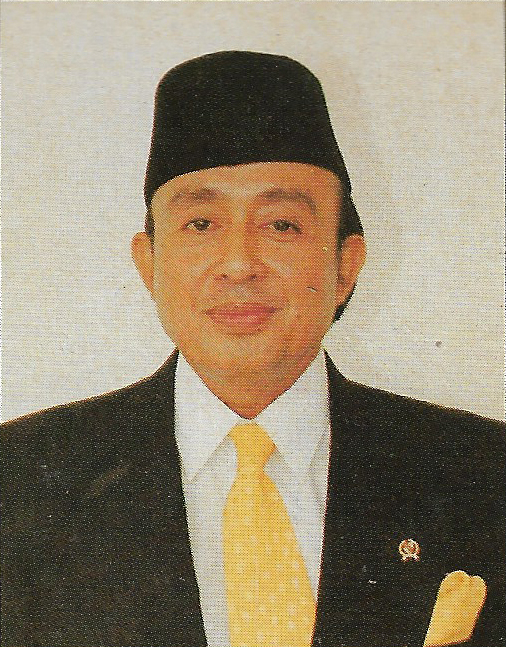

5th Minister of Tourism, Art, and Culture
- In office 16 March 1998 – 21 May 1998
- President: Soeharto
- Preceded by: Joop Ave
- Succeeded by: Marzuki Usman

18th Ministry of Manpower (Indonesia)
- In office 17 March 1993 – 14 March 1998
- President: Soeharto
- Preceded by: Cosmas Batubara
- Succeeded by: Theo L. Sambuaga

Personal details
- Born: April 27, 1940 (age 86) Banda Aceh, Aceh, Dutch East Indies (Now is Indonesia)
- Spouse(s): Nursyamsiah; Donna Louisa Maria
- Children: Medina Latief Harjani; Dipo Latief
- Education: Akademi Pimpinan Perusahaan Jakarta; Universitas Krisnadwipayana
- Occupation: businessman

Abdul Latief (born April 27, 1940) is the prominent Indonesian businessman and politician. He was the founder of Pasaraya department store and television network Lativi, as well as the former Indonesian minister in the New Order era.

== Early life ==
Abdul Latief was born on April 27, 1940, in Banda Aceh, Nanggroe Aceh Darussalam. He was bought up according to Muslim and Minangkabau traditions. Latief's father was a textile trader and his mother was an activist in Aisyiyah (a part of the Muhammadiyah Islamic organization). In 1950, Latief's family moved from Banda Aceh to Jakarta.

While at school, he performed well enough academically to become the best student. After graduating, Latief worked as head of promotion in the Sarinah department store. He also attended in-store management courses in Tokyo, Japan. In 1972, Latief founded the Indonesian Young Entrepreneur Association, known as HIPMI, and he was elected as leader for 1972–1973.

== Business career ==
After working for about nine years in department stores, in 1972 Latief decided he wanted to own a department store, but had to settle for a variety store. Starting from a mini store in Grogol, Jakarta, Latief and his brother, Abdul Muthalib, founded PT Latief Marda Corporation. Two years later, they founded PT Indonesia Product Centre Sarinah Jaya, with brand name Pasaraya. In 2001, Latief expanded his business into television, by establishing the Lativi television network. Latief is also involved in the property business with development of Sentraya 41-storey skyscraper in Blok M, South Jakarta. In 1990s, Latief published two printed media namely Tiras magazine and Neraca daily newspaper. At the end of 1990s, Abdul Latief as well as Fahmi Idris, Aminuzal Amin, and Nasroel Chas established a joint venture company Nagari Development Corporation (NDC), which aims to improve the Minangkabau community.

Today, all of his business in retailing, media, property, advertising, finance, and agrobusiness are grouped in the ALatief Corporation.

== Political career ==
In 1993, Latief was chosen as a Minister of Manpower under Soeharto presidency. During his term of office, the government approved the regional minimum salary for labor, known as 'Upah Minimum Regional'. He was re-elected as Minister of Tourism, Art, and Culture in 1998.

== See also ==
- Minangkabau businesspeople
