= Mardijo =

Indonesian politician (1944–2022)

Speaker of Central Java DPRD
- In office 1999–2004
- Preceded by: Alip Pandoyo
- Succeeded by: Murdoko

Personal details
- Born: 6 February 1944; Kutoarjo, Japanese-occupied Dutch East Indies
- Died: 1 October 2022 (aged 78); Semarang, Central Java, Indonesia

Mardijo (6 February 1944 – 1 October 2022) was an Indonesian politician. He was the speaker of the Central Java Regional People's Representative Council between 1999 and 2004, and was a gubernatorial candidate for the province in 2003. He was a member of PDI-P and later joined the Democratic Renewal Party.

== Early life and career ==
Mardijo was born in the town of Kutoarjo, today in Purworejo Regency, on 6 February 1944. He received basic education in Kutoarjo, until he graduated from high school in 1963. Afterwards, he enrolled at the faculty of medicine at Diponegoro University, but he dropped out in 1967 as his parents could no longer fund his education. He was active in student movements during his studies, such as the Indonesian National Student Movement and the Marhaenist Youth Movement. After dropping out, Mardijo began working as a salesman of laboratory equipment.

== Political career ==
Mardijo began to enter politics in 1976, joining the Indonesian Democratic Party (PDI), and he was appointed head of the party's bureau for economics and development in Semarang. However, due to internal party conflict, he left in 1982, and he would rejoin PDI in 1993. He was immediately appointed as vice chairman of the party's Semarang branch, and by 1996 as the treasurer of the party's provincial branch in Central Java. By 2000, he had been appointed as the chairman of the Central Java branch of the party, now renamed to Indonesian Democratic Party of Struggle (PDI-P). He was also elected into the Central Java Regional People's Representative Council following the 1999 election, and became the legislature's speaker for the 1999–2004 term.

In 2003, he nominated himself as the gubernatorial candidate for PDI-P in a challenge against fellow PDI-P member and incumbent Mardiyanto. When his candidacy was rejected by the party and he was told not to run, he defied this order and was thus removed from his chairman post. In the election, the PDI-P councillors' vote split, but with the support of the National Awakening Party, Mardiyanto defeated Mardijo with a wide margin. Thousands of Mardijo's supporters rioted following the vote, damaging PDI-P tents and forcing the councillors to be evacuated. Following the election, he left PDI-P and joined the Democratic Renewal Party, running unsuccessfully as a candidate for the People's Representative Council in the 2009 legislative election.

In 2005, he was accused of graft of the provincial budget, and was sentenced to one year in prison by the Semarang District Court. Upon appeal, his sentence was first increased to two years by the Central Java High Court, and later the Supreme Court of Indonesia reduced it back to one year, plus two years probation. Following a judicial review, his sentence was set to two years in 2011, and he was imprisoned then. After his release, he rejoined PDI-P, and campaigned for the party in the 2014 presidential election.

He died on 1 October 2022 in his home in Semarang.
