= Sujamto =

Indonesian bureaucrat and politician (1934-1994)

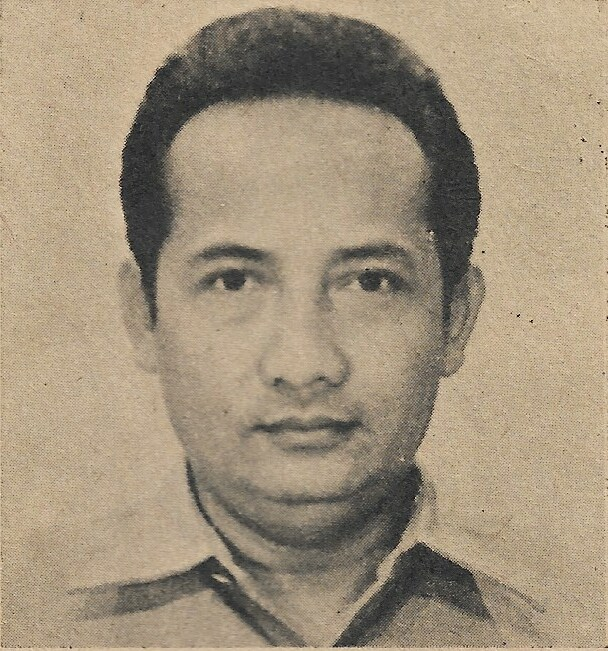

Vice Governor of Central Java
- In office 21 November 1990 – 10 June 1994 Serving with Soenartedjo (1990–1992) and Soesmono Martosiswojo (1992–1994)
- Preceded by: Soeparto Tjitrodihardjo
- Succeeded by: unknown

Personal details
- Born: 14 August 1934; Sukoharjo, Central Java, Dutch East Indies
- Died: 10 June 1994 (aged 59); Semarang, Central Java, Indonesia
- Spouse: Soetji Soeharini
- Children: 4
- Education: Gadjah Mada University

Sujamto (14 August 1934 – 10 June 1994) was an Indonesian politician and bureaucrat. He was Central Java's provincial secretary from 1989 to 1990 and vice governor from 1990 until his death 1994.

== Early life and education ==
Sujamto was born in Sukoharjo on 14 August 1934. His family later moved to Surakarta and he spent most of his childhood in the city. He completed his basic education at the Taman Siswa school in 1949, 6th Surakarta State Junior High School in 1952, and 1st Surakarta State High School in 1955. He then studied agriculture at the Gadjah Mada University and graduated with an engineer's (Ir.) degree in 1961.

== Career ==
After graduating from the university, Sujamto worked as a lecturer in the university, where he taught plant breeding until 1965. He was also a visiting lecturer at the North-Southeast Sulawesi University (later renamed to Sam Ratulangi University) from 1962 until 1964.

Sujamto began working in the government in 1965 and became the head of the planning bureau of the Department of Public Irrigation. He also became the chief of the Jatiluhur Dam (his official title was the Commander of the Jatiluhur Tertiary Irrigation Command).

Following government reorganizations during the transition to the New Order, the Department of Public Irrigation was dissolved and Sujamto was transferred to the Department of Home Affairs. He became the inspector for the Sulawesi region from 1971 until 1974 and the Sumatra region from 1974 until 1978. During his tenure as Sumatra's inspector, Sujamto was noted to have investigated the Kerinci regional government due to a gasoline crisis which left the region with no fuel. After working as inspector for different regions, Sujamto was promoted to the position of the secretary of the inspectorate general, the second highest position in the inspectorate general of the Department of Home Affairs. Sujamto held this position for eight years until 1987 and under four different inspector generals. He then became the secretary of the directorate general of general governance and regional autonomy from 1987 until 1989.

In June 1989, Sujamto was appointed by the Governor of Central Java as the provincial secretary. He then became the vice governor of Central Java for development affairs on 21 November 1990, replacing Soeparto Tjitrodihardjo. His portofolio was later changed to the vice governor for governance affairs.

== Personal life ==
Sujamto was married to Soetji Soeharini. The couple had four children.

On the afternoon of 10 June 1994, Sujamto was working as usual when he complained that he was suffocating. Sujamto was then brought to the Telagarejo hospital, where he died several minutes after arriving. He was buried at his family's cemetery in Ponorogo.
