= Soeparto Tjitrodihardjo =

Indonesian bureaucrat and politician (1929–2023)

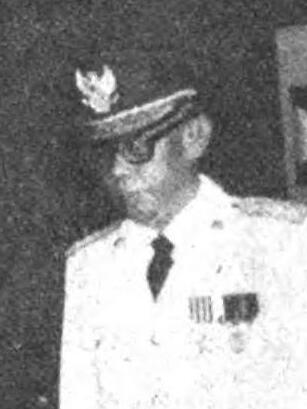

Speaker of Central Java Regional People's Representative Council
- In office 1992–1997
- Preceded by: Soekorahardjo
- Succeeded by: Alip Pandoyo

Vice Governor of Central Java (Development Affairs)
- In office 22 October 1985 – 21 November 1990 Serving with Sukardjan Hadisutikno (1985-1987) and Soenartedjo (1987-1990)
- Preceded by: Sukardjan Hadisutikno
- Succeeded by: Sujamto

Personal details
- Born: 31 July 1929 Semarang, Central Java, Dutch East Indies
- Died: 21 January 2023 (aged 93) Semarang, Central Java, Indonesia
- Spouse: Siti Ismiati (m. 1958)
- Children: 6
- Education: Gadjah Mada University; Wayne State University

Soeparto Tjitrodihardjo (31 July 1929 – 21 January 2023) was an Indonesian politician and bureaucrat. He was the Vice Governor of Central Java for development from 1985 until 1990 and the Speaker of Central Java Regional People's Representative Council from 1992 until 1997. He is commonly known as Pak Parto.

== Early life and education ==
Soeparto was born in Gunung Pati, Semarang on 31 July 1929 as the oldest child of Tjitrodihardjo and Sumini. His father, Tjitrodihardjo, worked as a teacher and headmaster. Soeparto's younger brother, Sutiyoso, later became the governor of Jakarta and the Director of State Intelligence Agency.

He completed his basic education at a people's school (equivalent to elementary school) in Ungaran in 1945. During the Indonesian National Revolution, he joined the student's forces (Tentara Pelajar) and fought against the Dutch forces in the Battle of Semarang. Despite his involvement in battles, Soeparto managed to continue his education, and graduated from a teacher's school in Magelang in 1948.

After the revolution ended, Soeparto attended high school in Semarang and completed it in 1951. He then studied governance sciences at the Gadjah Mada University (UGM) and received a scholarship from the Department of Home Affairs. During his time in the university, Soeparto joined the Indonesian National Student Movement (GMNI, Gerakan Nasional Mahasiswa Indonesia), a student organization affiliated with the Indonesian National Party.

Soeparto obtained an associate degree from the university in 1954 and began working at the Department of Home Affairs. He became the head of a section inside the department's election bureau for about six months before returning to complete his degree in UGM. He eventually received a full bachelor's degree (doctorandus) in 1958.

== Career ==
Upon receiving a full degree, Soeparto was sent by the Department of Home Affairs to West Kalimantan. He held various positions in West Kalimantan's governor's office, such as the head of legal affairs from 1959 until 1961, head of rural and regional affairs from 1962 until 1963, and a member of the daily governing council from 1963 until 1964. During his tenure in West Kalimantan, Soeparto attended a non-degree course at the Department of Political Science College of Liberal Arts in the Wayne State University in 1962. Soeparto also became a member of the Indonesian National Party, but later left the party due to his status as a civil servant.

Soeparto returned to Central Java in 1969 and was appointed the head of the governance bureau in Central Java's governor office until 1970. He then became the head of the personnel bureau until 1973. The provincial secretary of Central Java, Kardiman, appointed him as his assistant. Soeparto became the assistant to the provincial secretary until 1984 and served under three different provincial secretaries: Colonel Kardiman, Brigadier General Soeparno, and Soenartedjo. Soeparto then became the assistant to the governor for the Pati region and the head of the provincial planning agency.

On 22 October 1985, Soeparto was installed as the vice governor of Central Java for development. In September 1988, Soeparto was nominated as the sole candidate for the chairman of Golkar in Central Java. Despite attempts to nominate an alternative candidate from Golkar members, Soeparto was unanimously selected for the position. He was then sent as the province's delegate to Golkar's party congress in October 1988. In the congress, he led a commission on Golkar's political statement. Soeparto described his commission as "the commission with the most heated debates" amongst other commissions, with 118 proposals coming from 31 different members in a single session. Aside from his involvement in politics, Soeparto also served as the chairman of Central Java's Olympic committee from 1986 until 1992.

He ended his tenure as vice governor on 21 November 1990 and was replaced by Soejamto. Afterwards, he was nominated by Golkar for the Central Java Regional People's Representative Council in the 1992 Indonesian legislative election. He won the election and became the speaker of the council until 1997. Upon the end of his term in the council, Soeparto joined the '45 Generation board in Central Java, an organization for Indonesian National Revolution veterans, and became its chairman. He also became Central Java's regional delegate to the People's Consultative Assembly until 1998.

After the fall of Suharto, Soeparto joined Sutiyoso's party, the Indonesian Justice and Unity Party (PKPI, Partai Keadilan dan Persatuan Indonesia). He was nominated by the party for the People's Representative Council in the 2004 Indonesian legislative election, but failed to secure a seat. Soeparto was then appointed the chairman of PKPI in Central Java from 2010 until 2015.

== Personal life ==
Soeparto was married to Siti Ismiati, a teacher from Temanggung, in 1956. The couple has six children.

Soeparto died on 21 January 2023 in Semarang.

== Awards ==
- Medal for Contributing in the National Development (Indonesian: Satyalancana Pembangunan) (1990)
