= List of ministers of tourism (Indonesia) =

Ministry of Tourism (Indonesia)
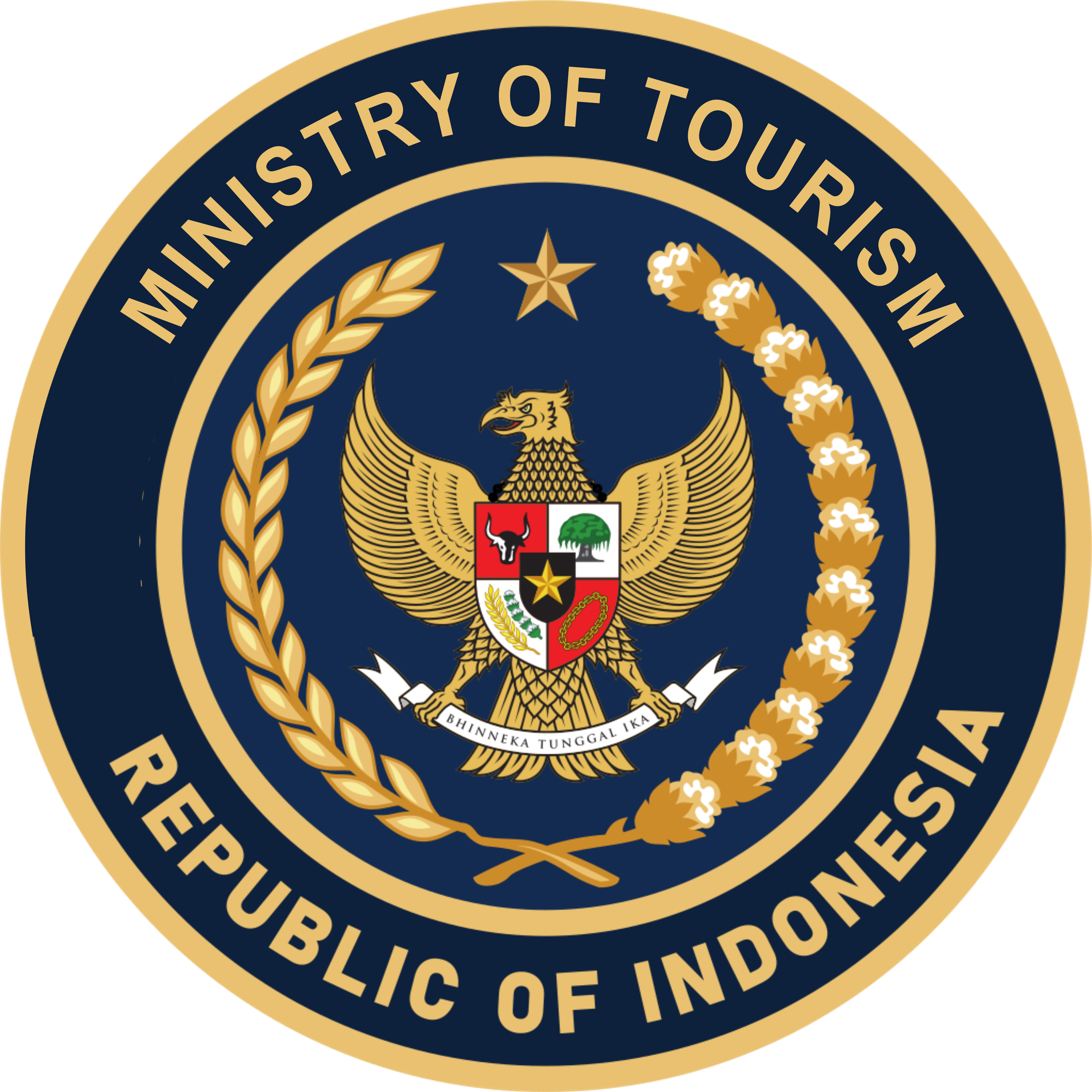

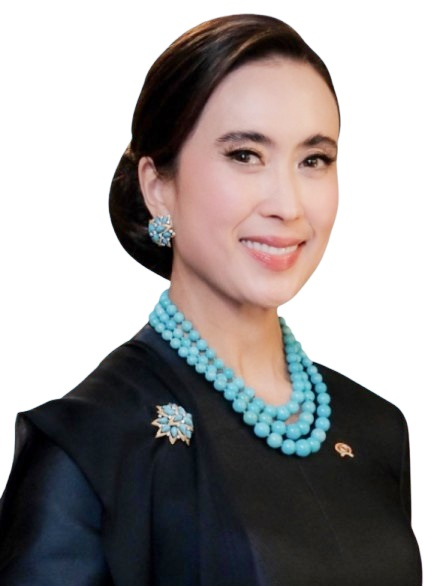
- Incumbent; Widiyanti Putri since 21 October 2024
- Appointer: President of Indonesia
- Inaugural holder: Hamengkubuwono IX
- Formation: 24 February 1966; 60 years ago
- Website: kemenpar.go.id

The following is a list of the Minister of Tourism of Indonesia. Initially, the nomenclature of this position was included in the Minister of Land Transportation, Post and Telecommunications. Then in the Revised Dwikora Cabinet (1966), this position was separated into the Minister of Tourism, first held by Hamengkubuwana IX. However, in the same year, precisely on July 25, 1966, this position was abolished, along with the end of the Second Revised Dwikora Cabinet.

Then in 1983 in the Fourth Development Cabinet under Suharto presidency, this position was held again with the name Minister of Tourism, Post and Telecommunications, held by Achmad Tahir.

This position has changed its name several times. In 1998, it changed its name to Minister of Tourism, Art, and Culture. Two months later after the reformation event, this ministerial position became a non-departmental minister under Habibie presidency, with the name Minister of State for Tourism, Art and Culture.

In 1999, under President Abdurrahman Wahid, this position changed its name to Minister of State for Tourism and Art. In 2001, in the Mutual Assistance Cabinet under Megawati Sukarnoputri, the cultural nomenclature was included in this position, so the name of the position changed to State Minister of Culture and Tourism.

In 2004 under Susilo Bambang Yudhoyono presidency, the position of this minister returned to the position of minister of department with the name of Minister of Culture and Tourism. Then in 2011, the term Department was replaced with the term Ministry. Yudhoyono also returned the nomenclature of Culture to the Ministry of Education. While the nomenclature of Creative Economy was added to Ministry of Tourism.

In 2014 under Joko Widodo presidency, the creative economy nomenclature was separated into a non-ministerial government agency, the Creative Economy Agency. The name of this position was again the Minister of Tourism. Five years later in 2019, the creative economy nomenclature was merged back into the Ministry of Tourism, so that the position was renamed the Minister of Tourism and Creative Economy.

In 2024 under Prabowo Subianto presidency, the creative economy nomenclature was separated again into a separate ministry, so that it became 2 ministries, namely the Ministry of Tourism and the Ministry of Creative Economy.

No	Portrait	Name	Political party	Cabinet	Took office	Left office	Note
Merged to Minister of Transport, Post, Telecommunication and Tourism				Working III	6 March 1962	13 November 1963	
Merged to Minister of Transport, Post, Telecommunication and Tourism				Working IV	13 November 1963	27 August 1964	
Merged to Minister of Transport, Post, Telecommunication and Tourism				Dwikora I	27 August 1964	24 February 1966	
1		Hamengkubuwono IX	Independent	Dwikora II	24 February 1966	27 March 1966	(Note: Concurrently held position as Coordinating Minister for Development Compartment. On 18 March 1966, Hamengkubuwana IX concurrently held positions as Deputy Prime Minister ad-interim) (Note: As Minister of Tourism)
1		Hamengkubuwono IX	Independent	Dwikora III	31 March 1966	25 July 1966	(Note: Concurrently held position as Deputy Prime Minister for Economy, Finance and Development)
Position was removed, from Ampera Cabinet to Third Development Cabinet
2		Achmad Tahir	Golkar	Development IV	19 March 1983	21 March 1988	(Note: As Menteri Tourism, Posts and Telecommunication)
3		Susilo Sudarman	Golkar	Development V	21 March 1988	17 March 1993	
4		Joop Ave	Golkar	Development VI	17 March 1993	14 March 1998	
5		Abdul Latief	Golkar	Development VII	16 March 1998	20 May 1998	(Note: As Minister of Tourism, Art, and Culture)
6		Marzuki Usman	Independent	Development Reform Cabinet	23 May 1998	27 September 1999	(Note: As State Minister of Tourism, Art, and Culture)
—		Giri S. Hadihardjono (ad-interim)	Golkar	Development Reform Cabinet	1 October 1999	20 October 1999	
7		Hidayat Jaelani	Independent	National Unity	29 October 1999	23 August 2000	(Note: As State Minister of Tourism and Arts)
Merged to Minister of Culture and Tourism				National Unity	23 August 2000	23 July 2001	(Note: As State Minister of Culture and Tourism)
Merged to Minister of Culture and Tourism				Mutual Assistance	10 August 2001	20 October 2004	
Merged to Minister of Culture and Tourism				United Indonesia	21 October 2004	20 October 2009	(Note: As Minister of Culture and Tourism)
Merged to Minister of Culture and Tourism				United Indonesia II	22 October 2009	19 October 2011	
8		Mari Elka Pangestu	Independent	United Indonesia II	19 October 2011	20 October 2014	(Note: As Minister of Tourism and Creative Economy)
9		Arief Yahya	Independent	Working	27 October 2014	20 October 2019	
10		Wishnutama	Independent	Onward Indonesia	23 October 2019	23 December 2020	(Note: Concurrently held position as Head of Tourism and Creative Economy Agency)
11		Sandiaga Uno	Gerindra	Onward Indonesia	23 December 2020	20 October 2024	
11		Sandiaga Uno	United Development	Onward Indonesia	23 December 2020	20 October 2024	
12		Widiyanti Putri	Independent	Red and White	21 October 2024	Incumbent	

Minister name

== See also ==
- Cabinet of Indonesia
- Ministry of Tourism
- Ministry of Cultural Affairs
- Ministry of Creative Economy
