= Mbah Suro =

Indonesian mystic (1921–1967)

Village Head of Nginggil
- In office 1946 – 31 July 1962

Personal details
- Born: 17 March 1921 Nginggil, Dutch East Indies
- Died: 5 March 1967 (aged 45) Nginggil, Indonesia
- Profession: Mystic; Shaman

Military service
- Allegiance: Indonesia
- Branch/service: Yadau Brigade
- Years of service: 1945–?
- Rank: Sergeant
- Battles/wars: Indonesian National Revolution; Operasi Kamtib

Muljono, also known as Surodihardjo (17 March 1921 – 5 March 1967), or more popularly as Mbah Suro or Mbah Suro Nginggil, was a shaman, mystic, Sukarnoist, and village head from Blora Regency.

Born with the name Muljono, Suro came from a prominent family in Nginggil. His father was a village head, and he was a descendant of the founders of Nginggil. During the National Revolution, he fought against the Dutch by joining the Yadau Brigade. After that, he served as the Village head of Nginggil for 16 years (1946–1962).

After stepping down as village head, Suro focused on becoming a mystic. He established a hermitage in Nginggil and gained followers. After the 30 September Movement (G30S), Suro drew even more attention as many Communist Party of Indonesia (PKI) members fled to his hermitage.

The presence of fleeing PKI members led the Diponegoro Commander to order Suro to close down his hermitage. Suro refused to obey, prompting the Indonesian National Armed Forces (ABRI) to send troops to Nginggil on 5 March 1967. During the military operation in Nginggil, he was defeated and captured. However, he was killed that day while trying to escape.

== Early life and education ==
Muljono was born in Nginggil on 17 March 1921. He was a descendant of the founders of Nginggil. His father, Resosemito, was the Village Head of Nginggil, and his mother was named Sumitah. He had six younger sisters. He attended elementary school. During his school years, he was known as a lazy student with poor academic performance. He was also mischievous as a child. Nevertheless, he managed to graduate from primary school.

== Early career ==
During the National Revolution, Muljono joined the Yadau Brigade, led by Ahmad Wiro, with the rank of sergeant. This brigade was part of the Indonesian Navy.

In 1946, Muljono was elected as the Village Head of Nginggil after receiving 100% of the votes in the election. In 1960, he was reported to be a sympathizer of the BTI and PKI.

On 24 April 1962, he submitted a letter to the Resident of Pati requesting to be relieved from his position as Village Head of Nginggil. The request was granted, and Muljono stepped down as village head on 31 July 1962. According to Ramelan, Muljono resigned due to his involvement in the encroachment of Forestry Service land. Another version states that he left his position as village head to focus more on spiritual practices.

== Mystic ==
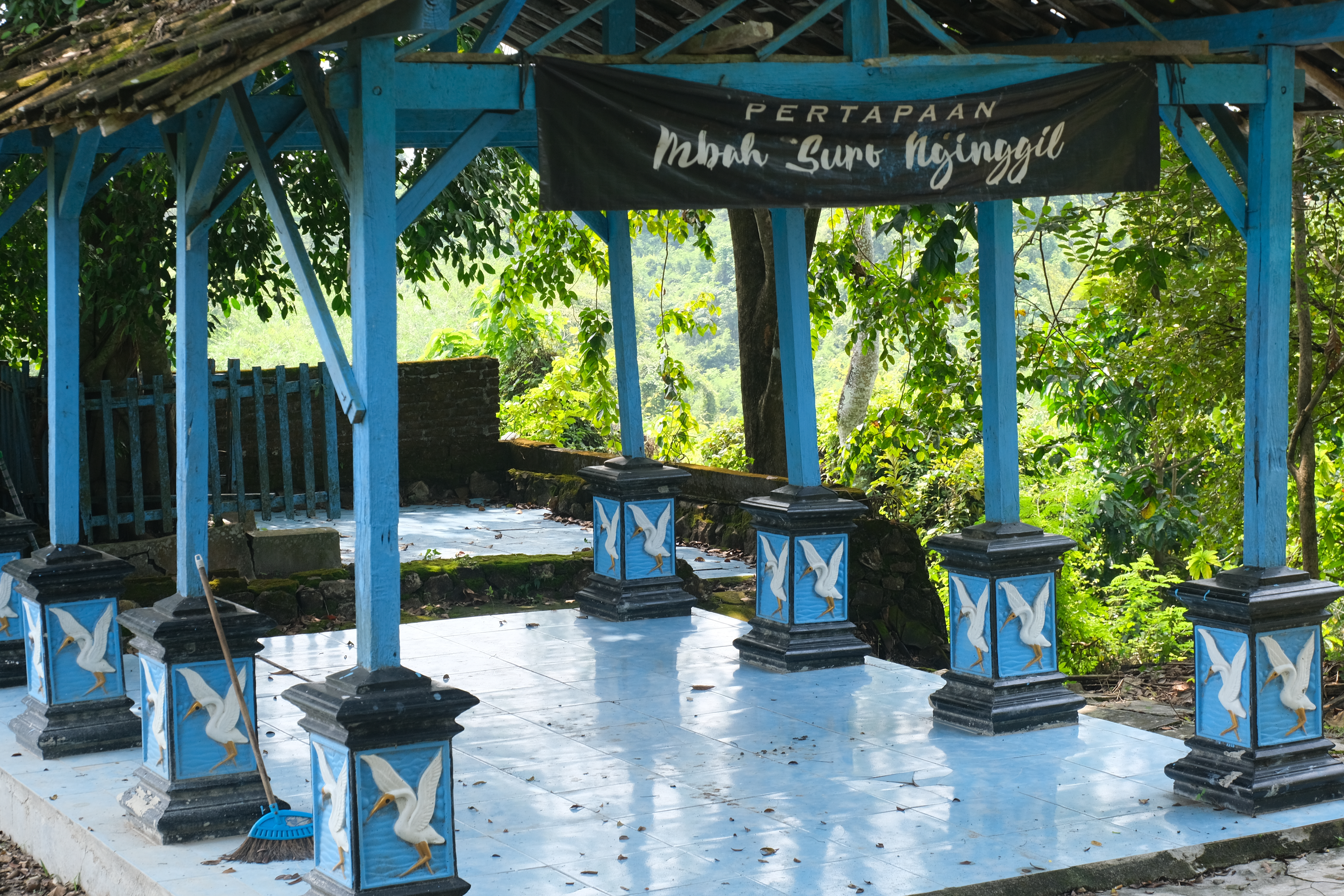
The place where Mbah Suro meditated in Nginggil

Muljono began practicing as a shaman in 1952 while he was still serving as village head. In the same year, he was given the nickname Mbah Suro after claiming to be possessed by the spirit of an elder during a meditation at the Mbisu punden (Note: Punden is a sacred ancestral burial place.) in Ngrawoh. However, according to Tirto, he only received the nickname Mbah Suro after resigning as village head.

Muljono was only recognized as a spiritual expert, teacher, and mystic in 1959. According to a forestry student who met him in 1960, Suro had not eaten rice for two years, consuming only cigarettes and coffee in practicing nglakoni. He also practiced a pati geni fasting (Note: Pati Geni is one of the kejawen fastings where a person is prohibited from leaving a windowless room during the fasting period.) for three days and three nights. After stepping down from his position as village head, he devoted himself fully to his role as a shaman and mystic. He also called himself Pandhito Gunung Kendheng.

After receiving the nickname Mbah Suro, he changed his appearance by growing a thick moustache and allowing his hair to grow long. He established a hermitage in the middle of a teak forest, placed a hammer and sickle emblem on his house, and spread the teachings of Djawa Dipa. He also provided his clients with charms and amulets. Suro's amulets were said to make people invulnerable to bullets and sharp weapons. Additionally, he was believed to have the ability to heal the sick. His healing abilities attracted many people from various places to visit his hermitage. He asked his clients to pay with kretek cigarettes, a bundle of flowers, a cloth strap, rice, eggs, and Rp 2.75.

=== After 30 September Movement ===
After the events of the 30 September Movement, the government began hunting PKI members. Many PKI members fled to Suro's hermitage in Nginggil to avoid government pursuit. Not only PKI members but also former ABRI members sought refuge there. It is estimated that thousands of people were hiding in his hermitage. In July 1966, he was estimated to have around 500,000 followers. His followers came not only from Java but also from outside Java.

As the leader of the hermitage, Suro told his followers that a deadly war followed by a massacre would occur in Java from the end of 1966 to early 1967. Whenever he gave a speech, he instructed his followers to sing the song Genjer-genjer and chant slogans such as "Long live Bung Karno," "Long live Mbah Suro," and "Long live the PKI." The activities of his hermitage caused the government to monitor Suro in 1966.

Suro proclaimed the reestablishment of the PKI on 3 March 1967. Previously, he had also formed two forces: Banteng Wulung for the male troops and Banteng Sarinah for the female troops. His forces obtained weapons from former ABRI members who had fled. It was reported that the Banteng Wulung had around 200 personnel, while the Banteng Sarinah consisted of 30 people. In addition to the troops, he also established a hermitage police force (PP). He assigned former ABRI members who became his students to serve as defence advisors for the hermitage.

The presence of fleeing PKI members in his hermitage led the Diponegoro Commander to try to close it down through non-violent means. On 22 October 1966, the Diponegoro Division Commander demanded Suro close his hermitage. They then sent two envoys to ask Suro to close the hermitage. However, he was still adamant in refusing the request, and his followers attacked the second envoy. His refusal prompted the ABRI to launch a military operation in Nginggil, sending troops consisting of RPKAD and regular soldiers from Battalions 408, 409, and 410.

The ABRI troops launched an attack on Nginggil on 5 March 1967. The ABRI assault succeeded in destroying Mbah Suro's movement. Moreover, he was captured by a joint ABRI unit. After being captured, he revealed that he was not invulnerable and that his followers had exaggerated his supposed invulnerability. After that, he and his wife fled into the forest. Realizing that he was escaping, the ABRI troops shot and killed him and his wife. He and his wife were then buried in Bodeh. Although he had died, he left a legacy in Nginggil in the form of a prayer house and roads.

== Personal life ==
Muljono married Rukmini in 1945. After his first marriage, he changed his name to Surodihardjo. He then divorced his first wife in 1960 because they had no children. He later married Suwarni. From both marriages, he did not have any children.

=== Religion ===
According to official records, Suro was a Muslim. However, Kompas reported that he did not believe in the existence of God and instead believed in spirits. He also once stated that the religion in Indonesia was Pancasila, with its highest deity being Batara Kala. Additionally, he showed hostility toward the santri group, declaring that if they came to Nginggil, they would be arrested.

== Bibliography ==
- Abdullah, Taufik; Abdurrachman, Sukri; Gunawan, Restu (2012). Malam Bencana 1965 Dalam Belitan Krisis Nasional: Bagian II Konflik Lokal. Jakarta: Yayasan Obor Indonesia.
