= Joop Ave =

Indonesian politician

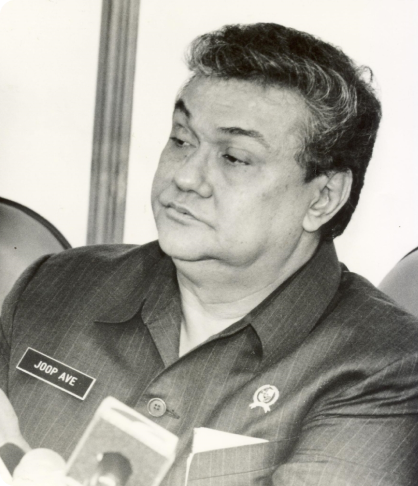

4th Minister of Tourism, Post, and Telecommunications
- In office 17 March 1993 – 14 March 1998
- President: Soeharto
- Preceded by: Susilo Sudarman
- Succeeded by: Abdul Latief

Personal details
- Born: December 5, 1934 Yogyakarta, Dutch East Indies
- Died: 5 February 2014 (aged 79) Singapore
- Education: University of the Philippines (Did not graduate)
- Occupation: Author; Broadcaster

Joop Ave (5 December 1934 – 5 February 2014) was the Indonesian Minister of Tourism, Post and Telecommunications (MENPARPOSTEL) between 1993 and 1998. He served in the Fourth Development Cabinet and was active for 20 years in the field of protocol. He was the Director General of Tourism (1982) and fluent in four foreign languages; English, Dutch, French and German.

Ave was born in Yogyakarta in 1934 in the former Dutch East Indies, as Indonesia was then called, as a colony of the Netherlands. Both parents were of Dutch/Indonesian origin but the name Ave comes from his father's ancestors who were of French descent. They fled France as Huguenots and eventually ended up in Indonesia via the Netherlands.

After the Second World War, a war of independence against Dutch colonization broke out in Indonesia and it was no longer safe in the country for Indos (Indonesians with partly Dutch roots). That is why Ave left for the Netherlands in 1946 with his mother, five sisters and a brother. His father died in captivity in 1944 after he was arrested by the Japanese occupiers for (alleged) membership of a resistance group. After Indonesia became independent from the Netherlands in 1949, Joop Ave returned that year to Indonesia with his mother and most of the siblings. Later, all the siblings and his mother moved to America (via the Netherlands) and eventually ended up in California. Only Joop has always lived in Indonesia, with breaks in between.

He studied at the Foreign Service Academy (1957) of the University of the Philippines, Manila, but did not complete the course.

He began his career in 1957 as an author and broadcaster on the French program at RRI Voice of Indonesia in Jakarta, before being hired by the Ministry of Foreign Affairs (1957). Ten years later, he was in charge of the Consulate General of Indonesia in New York City, US (1967), Secretary I (1970) and Consular Affairs (1972).

Ave served as the Head of Household at the Presidential Palace from 1972 until 1978. He was awarded the title of Raden Mas Kanjeng Haryo Condronegoro of Mangkunagara VIII. At the time of the Surakarta palace fire, he was one of a special group that was active in researching the cause of the blaze.

Before being appointed as Director General of Tourism (1982), he served as Director General of Protocol and Consular Affairs Department of the period (1978–1982). In addition to serving in the bureaucracy, he also served as Chairman of the ASEAN Sub-Committee on Tourism (1983–1986) and the PATA Board of Directors (1984–1986).

He was also a co-editor of a number of books about Indonesia and tourism.

Ave wrote about Indonesian art and craft, such as Batik.

Ave died at Mount Elizabeth Hospital, Singapore on 5 February 2014, after a long illness. He was 79. He was cremated three days later in Nusa Dua, Bali.

== Official postings ==
- Drafting programme and French broadcaster RRI, Jakarta (1957)
- Servant Ministry of Foreign Affairs (1957)
- Consul General in New York (1967)
- Secretary I (1970)
- Consular (1972)
- Head of the presidential palace in Jakarta (1972–1978)
- Director General of Protocol and Consular Department of Foreign Affairs (1978–1982)
- Director General of Tourism (1982–1988)
- Minister of Tourism Development Cabinet VI (17 March 1993 – 14 March 1998)
