= Jakarta–Peking Axis =

Cold War foreign policy alignment

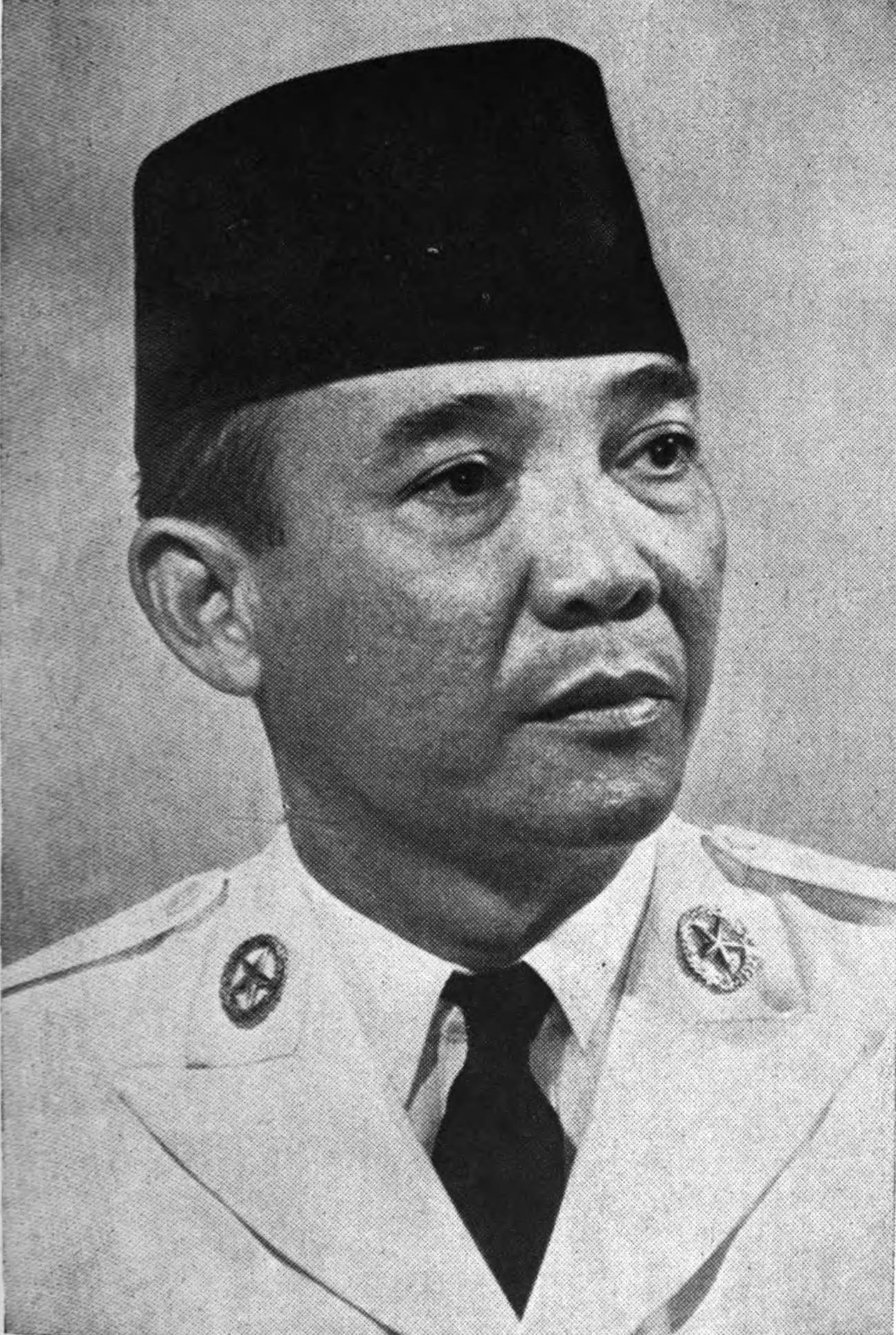
Sukarno

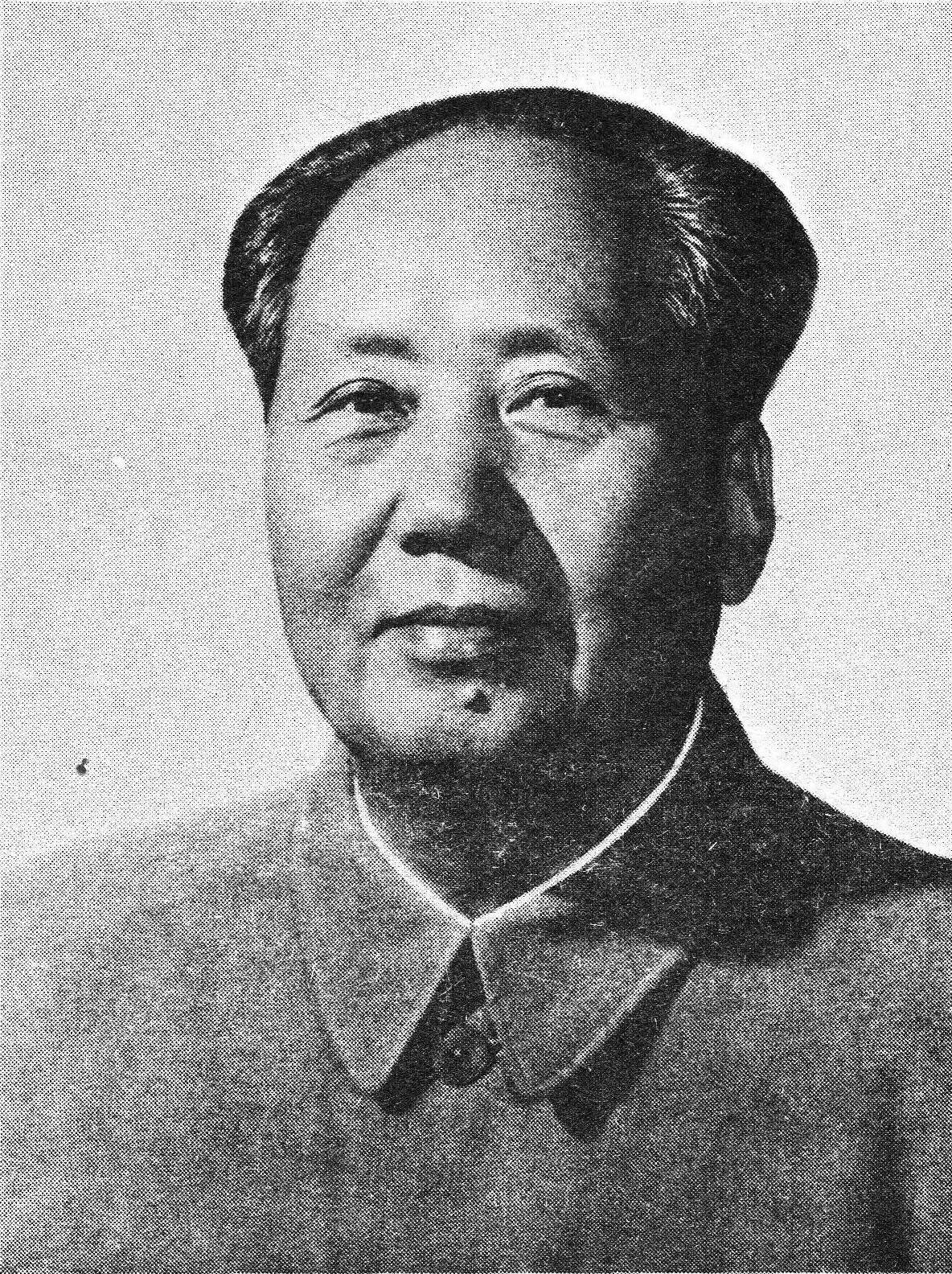
Mao Zedong

The Jakarta–Peking axis, also known as the Djakarta–Peking–Pyongyang–Hanoi–Ulaanbaatar–Phnom Penh Axis, was a form of geopolitical alignment during the Cold War era, representing a strategic convergence between Indonesia, North Korea, North Vietnam, Mongolia, and China. This political alignment was inaugurated in January 1965 as part of President Sukarno's foreign policy during Indonesia's Guided Democracy era. Although Indonesia maintained a nominally free and active foreign policy, Sukarno's administration exhibited strong anti-Western sentiments and gravitated towards communist countries.

== Political alignment ==
A notable manifestation of this policy was Indonesia's confrontation with Malaysia. President Sukarno perceived the formation of the Malaysian federation as an act of Western imperialism in Asia. Consequently, when Malaysia was appointed a non-permanent member of the United Nations Security Council (UNSC), Indonesia withdrew from the United Nations in protest. The conflict between Indonesia and Malaysia had elicited reactions from the Britain and Australia, which supported Malaysia. After Singapore's separation from Malaysia on August 9, 1965, Sukarno further reinforced his strong belief in confrontation. To strengthen Indonesia's position along with other anti-imperialist countries, in a speech on the occasion of August 17, 1965, he announced the establishment of the Jakarta–Peking axis. This axis was intended to break the 'Old Established Forces' (OLDEFOS) and rally the 'New Emerging Forces' (NEFOS). OLDEFOS, representing imperialist and colonialist powers primarily in the capitalistic Western bloc, and NEFOS, comprising anti-imperialist and anti-colonialist nations, notably in Asia, Africa, and Latin America. For Indonesia at the time, the politics of non-alignment does not inherently mean the politics of neutralism. In essence of the belief of Sukarno, non-alignment is the embodiment of active itself, so that Indonesian diplomacy at that time was directed at placing Indonesia not as a passive participant, but as an influential player in international politics.

This further increased Indonesia's diplomatic isolation from other Asian-African countries. Therefore, through Soebandrio, Indonesia tried to solidify the Jakarta-Peking (Beijing) relationship. At that time, Premier Zhou Enlai offered to arm a people's militia called the Fifth Force. In this regard, the Indonesian Communist Party (PKI) led by D.N. Aidit urged the formation of the Fifth Force, whose members were recruited from urban workers and laborers, agricultural laborers, and armed rural poor peasants. Sukarno's Jakarta-Peking axis, supported by the PKI, also marked a shift from Moscow's non-capitalist and peaceful coexistence policy approach to Beijing's anti-imperialism and self-reliance ideas.

== End ==
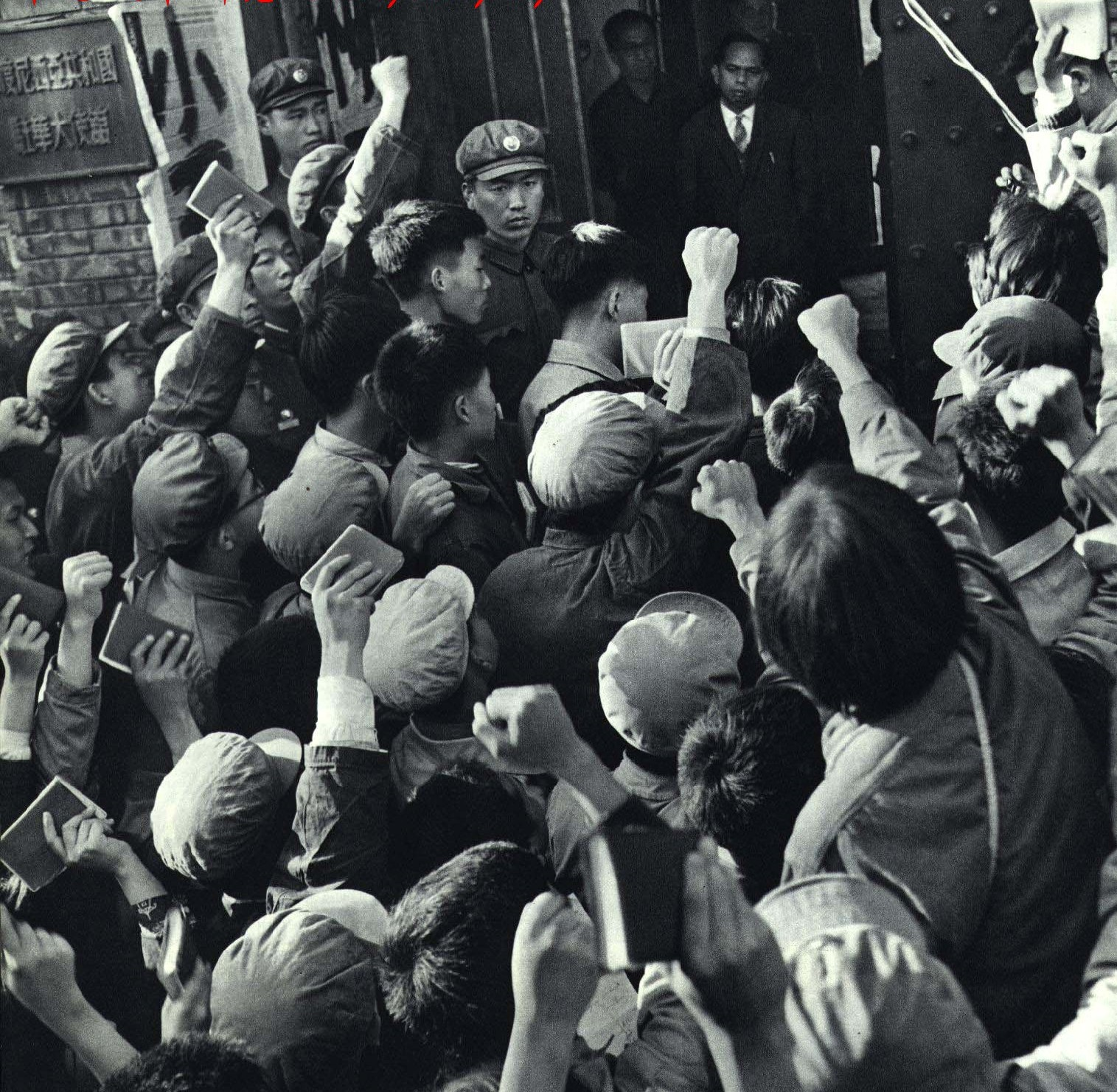
Protest at the Indonesian embassy in Beijing in April 1967 following Suharto's assumption of presidential power

After the birth of the New Order in 1966, Indonesia's foreign policy radically changed. As a result of the attempted coup by the September 30th Movement (G30S) in 1965, relations between Indonesia and China were strained. In fact, the Indonesian Embassy in Beijing was closed for an indefinite period. Meanwhile, confrontation with Malaysia and Singapore was no longer considered appropriate. At that time, the originally confrontational political direction changed, and the Jakarta–Peking axis ended.

== See also ==
- CONEFO
- Bamboo curtain
- China–Indonesia relations
