= Moenadi =

Indonesia general and politician (1923–2013)

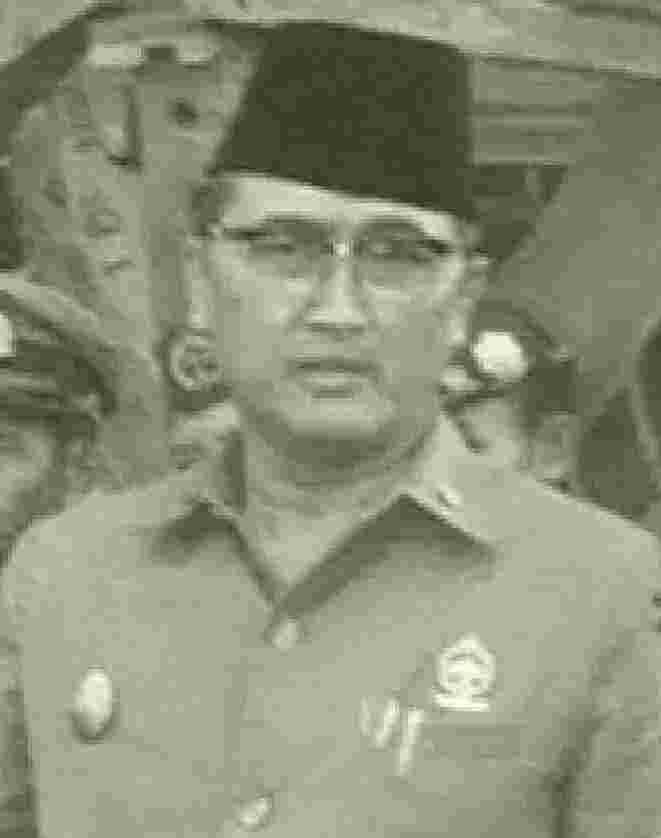
- Moenadi in 1971

Governor of Central Java
- In office 29 December 1969^{[a]} – December 1974
- Preceded by: Mochtar
- Succeeded by: Soepardjo Rustam

Personal details
- Born: 26 December 1923 Tuban, Dutch East Indies
- Died: 12 January 2013 (aged 89) Surakarta, Central Java, Indonesia

Military service
- Allegiance: Indonesia
- Branch/service: Indonesian Army
- Rank: Major general
- a. Acting since 1966

Moenadi (EYD: Munadi; 26 December 1923 – 12 January 2013) was an Indonesian military officer and politician who served as the Governor of Central Java between 1966 and 1974. He had previously served in the military, and was a subordinate officer of Suharto.

== Early life ==
Moenadi was born on 26 December 1923 in the town of Tuban, today in East Java. He was educated at Dutch colonial schools, and during the Japanese occupation of the Dutch East Indies he joined the Japanese-backed Defenders of the Homeland militia organization.

== Career ==
He fought on the Republican side during the Indonesian National Revolution, and in 1948, he was made territorial commander around Pati Regency with the rank of major, under Gatot Subroto's 2nd division. In independent Indonesia, Moenadi continued to serve in the army, becoming a staff officer of the Diponegoro Military Region. When future president Suharto became Diponegoro's commander during the 1950s, Moenadi was under his command as commander of the Semarang Military District. Moenadi would organize night markets in Semarang in order to fund the unit, which local military police units believed was a cover for illegal gambling activities. Both Moenadi and Suharto would be removed from their posts within Diponegoro in 1959. In 1960, with Suharto serving as commander of the Army's General Reserves, Moenadi (now a lieutenant colonel) would assist him in forming a new corps intended as a more mobile reserve unit. This unit was formed in 1961, today known as the Kostrad, and Moenadi would serve within it as a senior officer.

In 1966, following the 30 September movement, he was installed as acting governor of Central Java in 1966. Reportedly, Minister of Home Affairs Basuki Rahmat, who had known Moenadi since 1946, offered Moenadi the position during a flight from Jakarta to Semarang. He was made a full governor on 29 December 1969, following a unanimous provincial legislature vote to elect him on 29 September with no other candidates eligible. His tenure ended in December 1974, and he was replaced by Soepardjo Rustam. He held the final rank of major general before retiring from active service.

After his gubernatorial tenure, he became president director at a spice factory.

== Death ==
Moenadi died on 12 January 2013 in Surakarta. He was buried two days later at the Kusuma Bhakti Heroes' Cemetery within the city. A number of roads in Central Java are named after him.

== Personal life ==
Moenadi's first wife Istriati Moenadi was a member of the People's Consultative Assembly, and the couple had three children prior to Istriati's death in 1974. In 1981, he had his second marriage with 27-year-old Tan Li Chuk, who had converted to Islam and changed her name to Yuyuk Fatimah. Fatimah and Moenadi had two daughters.
