= Taj Mahal (disambiguation) =

The Taj Mahal is a mausoleum in Agra, India, built by Mughal Emperor Shah Jahan.

Taj Mahal may also refer to:

== Places ==
- Taj Mahal Bangladesh, a replica in Bangladesh
- Taj Mahal, Bhopal, the palace of Sultan Shah Jahan, Begum of Bhopal
- Taj Mahal, Bulandshahr (also known as Taj Mahal or Mini Taj Mahal or Qadri's Taj Mahal, and officially known as Maqbara Yadgare Mohabbat Tajammuli Begum), a replica of the historic Taj Mahal of Agra located in Kaser Kalan, a small village in Bulandshahr of Uttar Pradesh, India
- Taj Mahal, Iran, a village in Kerman Province, Iran
- Bibi Ka Maqbara, tomb of Mughal empress Dilras Banu Begum in Aurangabad, Maharashtra, India; known as the Taj Mahal of Deccan

== Brands and enterprises ==
- Taj Mahal, an Indian lager produced by United Breweries Group
- Taj Mahal Palace Hotel, a hotel in Mumbai, India
- Trump Taj Mahal, a hotel and casino resort in Atlantic City, New Jersey, US; now known as the Hard Rock Hotel & Casino Atlantic City

== People ==
- Taj Mahal (musician) (born 1942), American blues musician

== Arts, entertainment, and media ==
=== Films ===
- Taj Mahal (1941 film), an Indian historial drama film about Shah Jahan and the Taj Mahal
- Taj Mahal (1963 film), an Indian Hindi-language drama film by M. Sadiq about the construction of the Taj Mahal by Shah Jahan
- Taj Mahal (1995 film), an Indian Telugu-language romance film produced by D. Ramanaidu
- Taj Mahal (1999 film), an Indian Tamil-language romance film directed by Bharathiraja
- Taj Mahal (2008 film), an Indian Kannada-language romance film directed by R. Chandru
- Taj Mahal (2010 film), an Indian Telugu-language film directed by Arun Singaraju
- Taj Mahal (2015 film), 2015 Franco-Belgian film about the Mumbai Attacks set in the Taj Mahal Palace Hotel
- Taj Mahal: An Eternal Love Story, a 2005 Indian Hindi-language film about Shah Jahan and his Mughal court

=== Music ===
- Taj Mahal (album), by Taj Mahal
- "Taj Mahal", a song by Jorge Ben Jor from Ben (album)

=== Poetry ===
- The Taj-Mahal, at Agra., a poem by Letitia Elizabeth Landon.

=== Other uses in arts, entertainment, and media ===
- Taj Mahal (board game), introduced in 2000 in Germany

== See also ==
- Taj Mahal Hotel (disambiguation)
- Baby Taj, Tomb of I'timād-ud-Daulah, Agra, India
