= Al-Hakim Mosque (Indonesia) =

Mosque in Padang, Indonesia

- Masjid Al-Hakim Padang

Religion
- Affiliation: Islam
- Ecclesiastical or organisational status: Mosque
- Status: Active

Location
- Location: Jalan Samudera, Berok Nipah, Padang Barat, Padang, West Sumatra
- Country: Indonesia
- Interactive map of Al-Hakim Mosque
- Coordinates: 0°57′36.1″S 100°21′11.6″E

Architecture
- Type: Mosque
- Style: Mughal-inspired (Taj Mahal style)
- Groundbreaking: 2017
- Completed: 2020
- Construction cost: Rp7 billion (US $500k)

Specifications
- Capacity: 600
- Dome: 5
- Minaret: 4
- Site area: about 1.8 hectares

The Al-Hakim Mosque (Indonesian: Masjid Al-Hakim), also known as the Al-Hakim Padang Mosque, is a mosque on Padang Beach in Padang, Indonesia. It is named after al-Ḥākim bi-Amr Allāh (985–1021), the 6th Fatimid caliph. Its design, with five white domes and four minarets, is modeled on the Taj Mahal in India.

Construction began in early 2017 and the mosque opened for limited prayers on September 4, 2020, during the COVID-19 pandemic; it was formally inaugurated in November 2020. Funded by a private donor on land provided by the Padang city government, it has become both a place of worship and a tourist destination.

== History ==
The mosque stands on land that was formerly a children's play area occupied by street vendors, within the area of Padang Beach that the city government began redeveloping in 2014. The project was planned from 2016, when a donor settled on the beachfront site along Jalan Samudera. The donor, who wished to remain anonymous but was described as a Minangkabau businessman said that the mosque fulfilled the wish of his late mother. The city provided land along the beachfront and the vendors were relocated before construction could proceed.

Construction began in early 2017. The mosque opened for limited worship on September 4, 2020, under COVID-19 health protocols, with a formal inauguration planned for November 2020. It stands on a site of roughly 1.8 hectares, as part of the Padang Beach revitalization program.

== Architecture ==
The mosque is modeled on the Taj Mahal, with five domes and four minarets, and is dominated by white and gold tones. It holds about 600 worshippers. It was designed to be accessible to people with disabilities, including wheelchair access. A column inside is decorated with a sirih gadang motif drawn from Minangkabau ornamentation.

== Use and reception ==
The mosque is a prominent landmark on Padang Beach, locally known as Taplau. Visitors include families and young people from Padang and elsewhere, and many tourists come to take photographs before and after prayers. Mahyeldi Ansharullah, then mayor of Padang, said that it would serve as an icon of the beach and strengthen the city's position as a halal tourism destination. Researchers have noted that this tourist use has shifted the mosque's role from a purely religious building to a mixed religious and recreational public space, and that managers must balance visitor movement against worship.

A program known as the "rice ATM" distributes rice to about one hundred local households each week from the mosque.

== Gallery ==
View from the ocean (2020)

Under construction (2019)

Column decorated with a sirih gadang motif

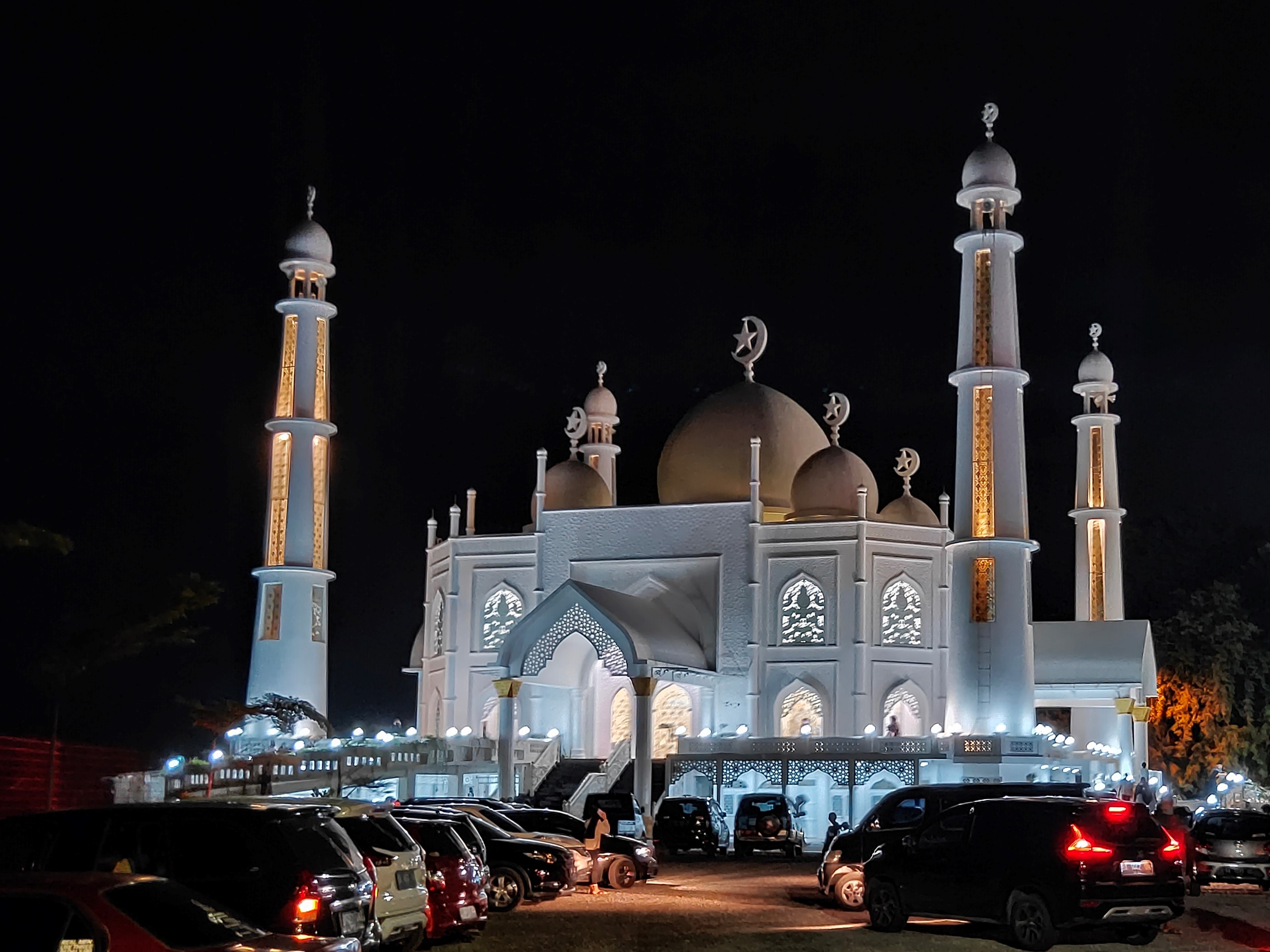
View at night

== See also ==
- List of mosques in Indonesia
- Islam in Indonesia
- Taj Mahal replicas and derivatives
