= Erwin Aksa =

Indonesian politician (born 1975)

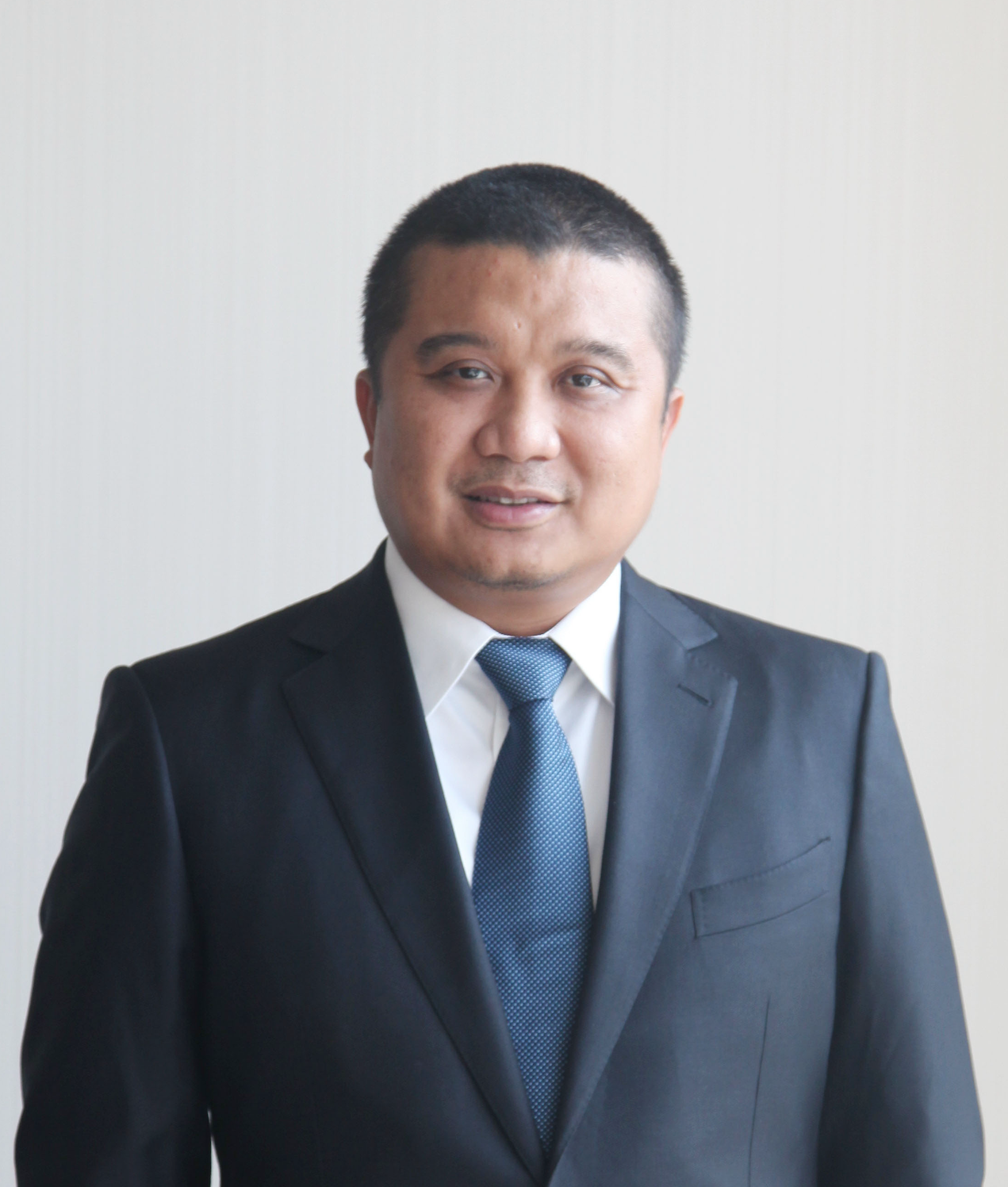

Member of House of Representatives
- Incumbent
- Assumed office 1 October 2024
- Constituency: Jakarta III

13th Chairman of Indonesian Young Entrepreneur Association
- In office 2008–2011
- President: Susilo Bambang Yudhoyono
- Preceded by: Sandiaga Uno
- Succeeded by: Raja Sapta Oktohari

Personal details
- Born: December 7, 1975 (age 50) Makassar, South Sulawesi, Indonesia
- Party: Golkar
- Spouse: Andi Fatmawati Manggabarani
- Relations: Jusuf Kalla (uncle)
- Children: 3
- Parent(s): Aksa Mahmud (father); Ramlah Kalla (mother)
- Education: University of Pittsburgh
- Occupation: Businessman, politician

Erwin Aksa Mahmud (born December 7, 1975), known as Erwin Aksa is an Indonesian politician and businessman. He is the deputy chairperson for Strategic Mobilization in Golkar Central Executive Board and the main commissioner of Bosowa Group which operated in Makassar. He was formerly the chairman of HIPMI from 2008 to 2011.

He was born in Makassar, South Sulawesi. After graduating from University of Pittsburgh with Bachelor of Economics in 1997, he joined Bosowa Corp which was held by his father, Aksa Mahmud. In 2006, Erwin was appointed President Director of Bosowa Group, and he now serves as President Commissioner of Bosowa Group.

== Early life and family ==
Erwin Aksa Mahmud was born on December 7, 1975, in Makassar, South Sulawesi. He is the eldest son of 5 children. His father, Aksa Mahmud is a politician and businessman. Mahmud found Bosowa Corp, which name derives from the regions of Bone, Sopeng, and Wajo. He also served as a member of the People's Consultative Assembly for the Regional Representative Faction from 1999 to 2004 and then served as a Senator in the Regional Representative Council from 2004 to 2009. He was also the Deputy Speaker of the People's Consultative Assembly from 2004 to 2009. His mother, Ramlah Kalla, is a sister to Vice President of Indonesia Jusuf Kalla.
