= Taj Mahal Hotel =

Taj Mahal Hotel may refer to:

- Taj Mahal Hotel, Abids, Hyderabad, India
- Taj Mahal Palace Hotel, Mumbai, India
- Taj Mahal Hotel, Lucknow
- Trump Taj Mahal, now the Hard Rock Hotel & Casino Atlantic City, New Jersey, US

== See also ==
- Taj Mahal (disambiguation)
