= Vasko Ruseimy =

Indonesian entrepreneur (born 1986)

Vasko Ruseimy Sutan Nagari Sati
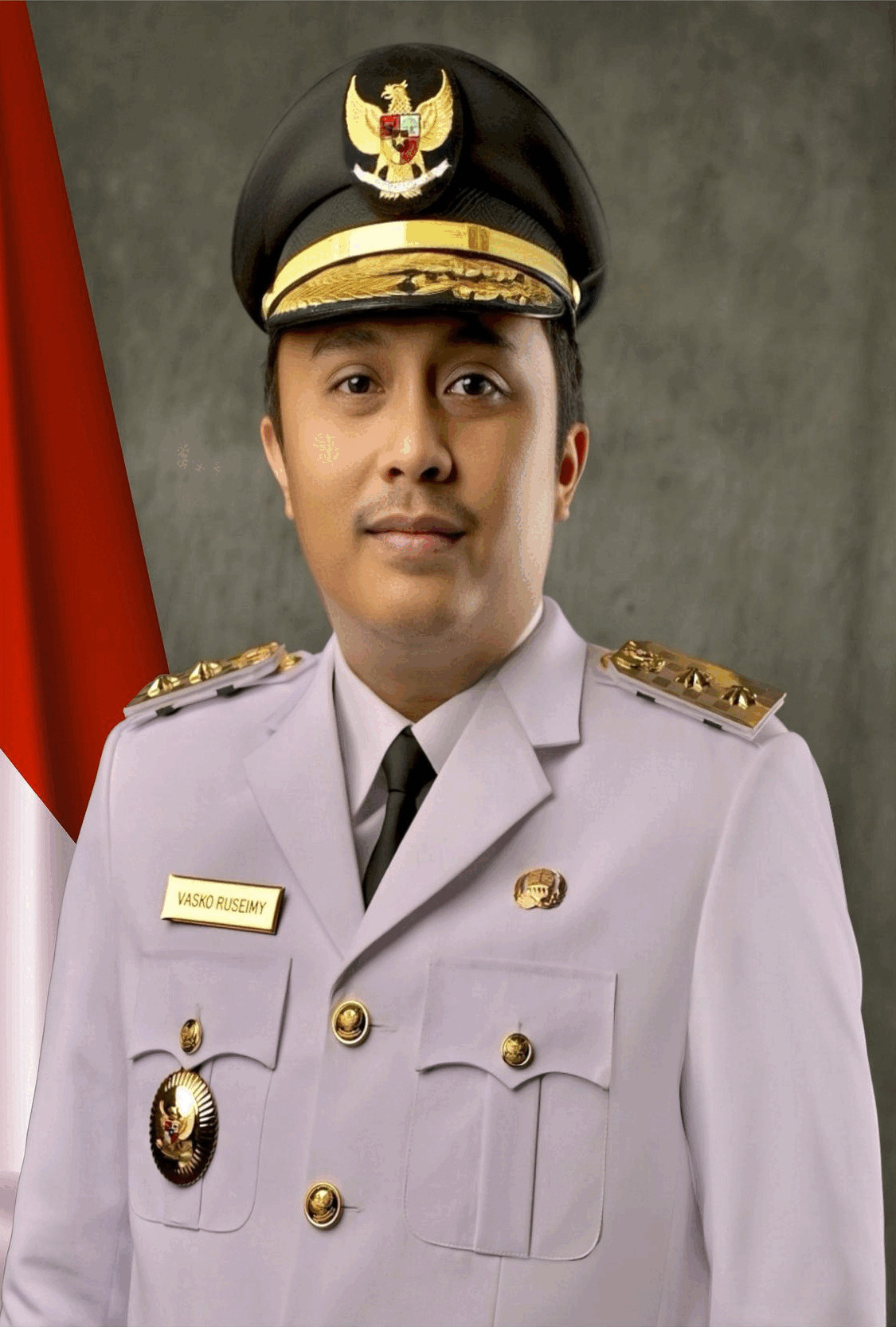

Vice Governor of West Sumatra
- Incumbent
- Assumed office 20 February 2025
- President: Prabowo Subianto
- Governor: Mahyeldi Ansharullah
- Preceded by: Audy Joinaldy

Chairman of the Gerindra Party's Central Executive Board for Public Opinion Management
- Incumbent
- Assumed office 2020

Personal details
- Born: Vasko Ruseimy; 13 July 1986 (age 40) Jakarta, Indonesia
- Party: Gerindra Party (since 2020)
- Other political affiliations: Golkar (2008–2018); Berkarya (2018–2020)
- Spouse: Dianita Maulin
- Children: 3
- Education: University of Indonesia
- Occupation: Entrepreneur; Politician; YouTuber
- Website: vaskoruseimy.id

YouTube information
- Channel: Macan Idealis
- Years active: 2019—now
- Subscribers: 1.35 million
- Views: 207 million
- Last updated: 24 September 2025

Vasko Ruseimy (also written as Vasco Ruseimy; born 13 July 1986) is an Indonesian entrepreneur, politician, and YouTuber who serves as the Vice Governor of West Sumatra for the 2025–2030 term. He runs the YouTube channel Macan Idealis. Ruseimy currently serves as Chairman of the Central Executive Board (DPP) of the Gerindra Party and chairman of the advisory board (BPP) of the Indonesian Young Entrepreneur Association (HIPMI). Vasko is a Minangkabau and belongs to the Sikumbang clan. He also serves as Chairman of the Gerindra Party's Central Executive Board for the 2025–2030 term.

== Early life and education ==
Vasko was born in Jakarta on 13 July 1986 to Minangkabau parents. His father, Rustan Husein, belongs to the Piliang clan, and his mother, Ermiaty, belongs to the Sikumbang clan and hails from Candung, Agam Regency. He received his education at Perwara Elementary School (1992–1998), SMP Negeri 5 Jakarta (1998–2001), and SMA Negeri 1 Jakarta (2001–2004). He pursued higher education in Chemical Engineering at the Faculty of Engineering of the University of Indonesia, earning his Bachelor of Engineering degree in 2009.

Vasko once served as Head of a Division in the Student Executive Board of the Faculty of Engineering, University of Indonesia (2005–2006), Chairman of the Indonesian Chemical Engineering Student Activities Coordination Board at the Faculty of Engineering of the University of Indonesia (2006–2007), and Chairman of the Society of Indonesian Petroleum Engineers (2006–2009).

== Career ==
In 2009, Vasko began his career as an Account Manager at FEI & Panalitical Company, a position he held until 2010. In the same year, he founded and served as President Director of PT Berkah Lestari Indonesia. In 2014, he founded and became President Director of PT Karya Pilar Mandiri.

In 2008, Vasko entered politics by serving as Deputy Chairman of the Indonesian Renewal Youth Force until 2017 and as Chairman of the Young Generation of the Mutual Assistance Families Association until 2015. He also served as President of the Leo Club Jakarta Monas Youth Dynamic (a branch of Lions Clubs International) from 2009 to 2011.

=== Political career ===
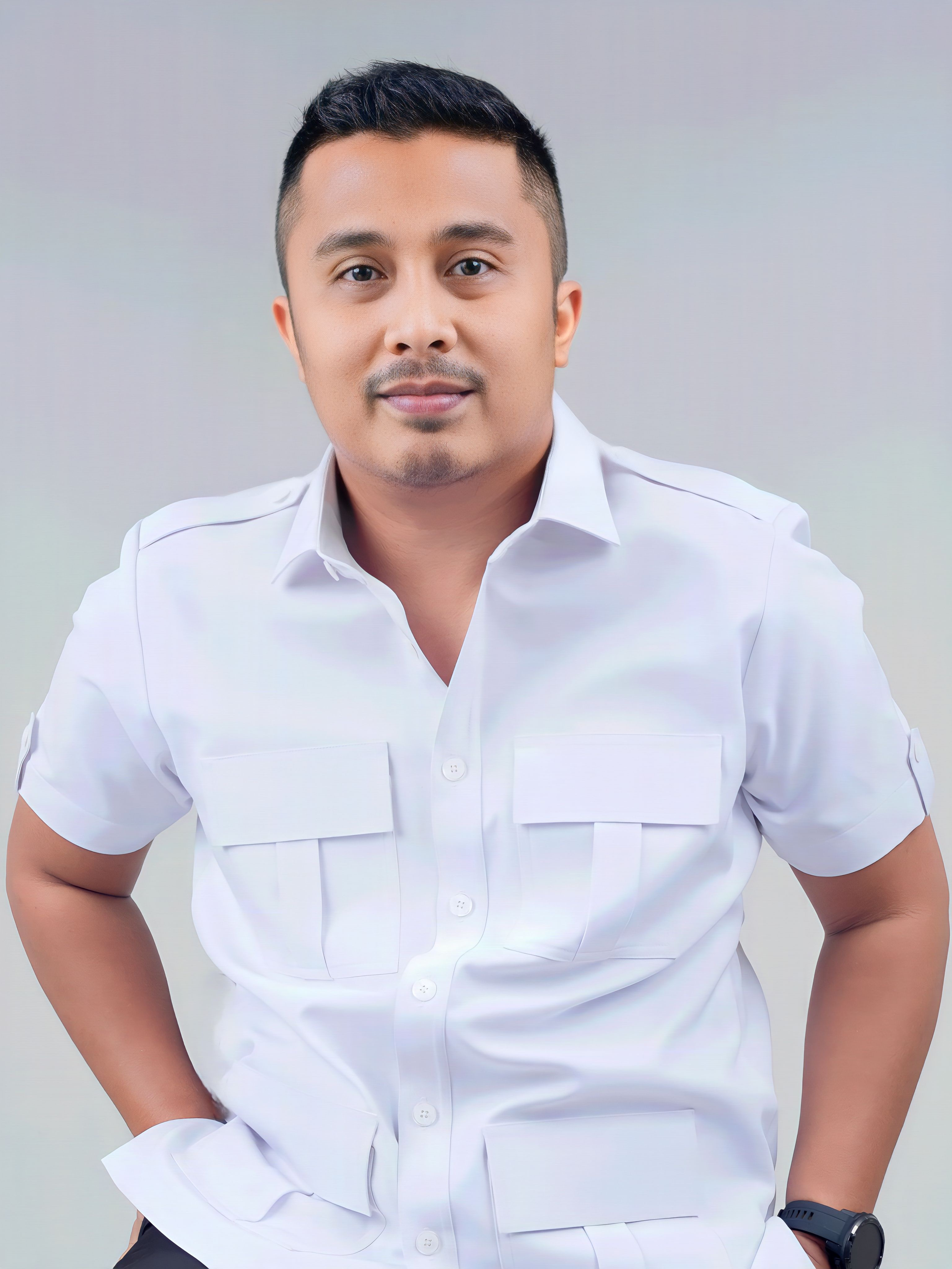
Vasko Ruseimy in 2023

Vasko ran in the 2009 general election as a candidate for the House of Representatives from the Golkar representing Central Java VII electoral district. At the age of 22, he was recorded as Golkar's youngest legislative candidate at the time. He was not elected, receiving only 1,390 votes. He also served as a Campaigner and as a member of the Division of Inter-Institutional Relations at the Central Board of the Information and Communication Agency of the Golkar Central Executive Board at that time.

In 2010, Vasko became Chairman of the Gema MKGR Central Executive Board (DPP), Deputy Secretary-General of the Indonesian Engineer Association's Youth Forum, and Deputy Chairman of the Minang Young Entrepreneurs Association, positions he held until 2015. In 2011, he was appointed Chairman of the Indonesian Young Entrepreneurs Association (HIPMI) for Greater Jakarta, a position he still holds today. In 2012, in his capacity as Chairman of Gema MKGR, he was summoned to provide testimony as a witness in a corruption case involving Zulkarnaen Djabar. Subsequently, he served as Deputy Secretary-General of the Golkar Party's Central Executive Board (DPP) and, in 2014, joined the Agung Laksono faction until 2016. In 2015, he became Deputy Secretary-General of the Indonesian Association of Muslim Intellectuals (ICMI), a position he still holds. In 2017, he was listed as Deputy Chairman of the Islamic Youth Awakening Union (Syarikat Kebangkitan Pemuda Islam).

In 2018, Vasko switched parties and served as Chairman of the Central Executive Board of the Berkarya Party until 2020. Before deciding to change parties, he consulted with Berkarya Party leaders: Titiek Soeharto and Priyo Budi Santoso. He also admitted to being an admirer of Soeharto. According to him, certain New Order programs that were considered beneficial should be revived, as they had proven to bring national stability at the time. The programs he referred to included sensitivity in selecting officials, Kelompencapir (listener, reader, and viewer groups), Indonesia's 1984 food self-sufficiency program, transmigration, the nickname “Asian Tiger” for Indonesia, and Soeharto's conflict management ability, which maintained stability. He ran in the 2019 general election as a candidate for the House of Representatives from the Berkarya in Jakarta II electoral district, but was not elected. He also served as Spokesperson and deputy director of IT for the National Campaign Team (BPN) of Prabowo Subianto–Sandiaga Uno in the 2019 Indonesian presidential election.

In 2020, following an invitation from Sufmi Dasco Ahmad, Vasko joined the Gerindra and was assigned as Chairman of the Central Executive Board (DPP) for Public Opinion Management. In 2022, he became Chairman of Division II for Finance, Banking & Development Planning of the Central Executive Board (BPP) of the Indonesian Young Entrepreneurs Association (HIPMI). Within HIPMI, he encouraged active youth participation in economic and social development and promoted greater engagement of young people in the business sector. He also became the Deputy Chairman of the Expert Council of the National Creative Economy Movement. Additionally, he served as a Special Staff to the Deputy Speaker of the Indonesian House of Representatives, Sufmi Dasco Ahmad.

Vasko ran for the third time as a candidate for the House of Representatives in the 2024 general election from the Gerindra Party representing West Sumatra I, but was not elected. He also served as one of the Vice Commanders of the Young Voters National Campaign Team (TKN Fanta) of Prabowo Subianto–Gibran Rakabuming Raka for the 2024 Indonesian presidential election.

=== 2024 West Sumatra gubernatorial election ===
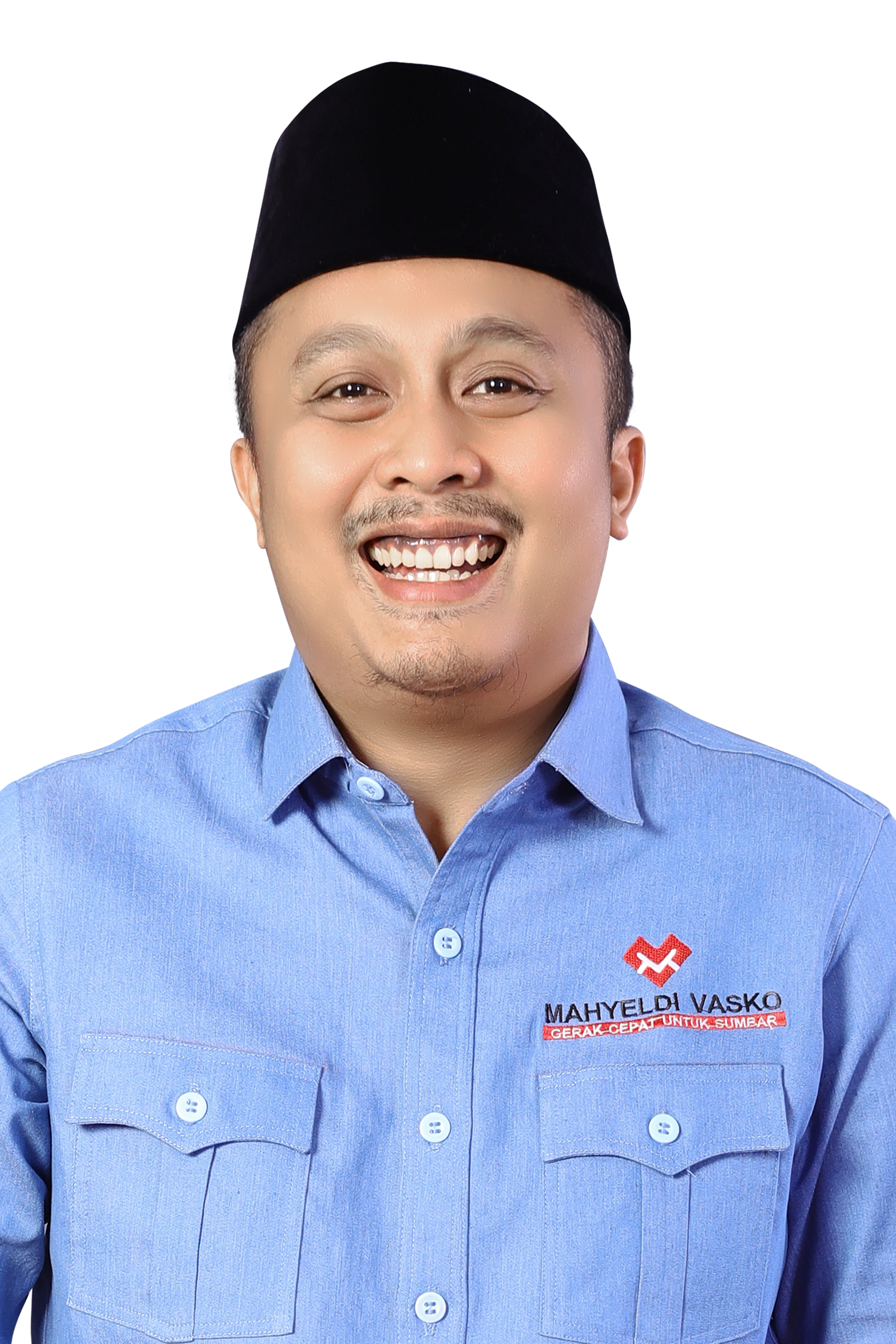
Vasko as candidate of Vice Governor, 2024

The Prosperous Justice Party (PKS) and Gerindra officially endorsed the incumbent Mahyeldi and Vasko Ruseimy as candidates for Governor and Deputy Governor in the 2024 West Sumatra gubernatorial election. This candidacy aimed to continue development initiatives and address the local needs. Mahyeldi brought his experience as the current governor, while Vasko Ruseimy was known for his leadership in various organizations.

On 27 August 2024, the Mahyeldi-Vasko registered to the General Elections Commission (KPU) and the pair was supported by PKS, Gerindra, Demokrat, Perindo, and PBB. Running as candidate pair number 1, Mahyeldi and Vasko Ruseimy were officially elected as Governor and Vice Governor of West Sumatra by the West Sumatra General Elections Commission on 9 January 2025, based on Decree No. 3 of 2025 of West Sumatra KPU.

== Personal life ==
Vasko married Dianita Maulin on 6 April 2013. In accordance with Minangkabau customs, Vasko was given the title Sutan Nagari Sati after the marriage. They have three children.
