= 2024 West Sumatra gubernatorial election =

- 27 November 2024
- Turnout: 57.25% (▼4.94pp)
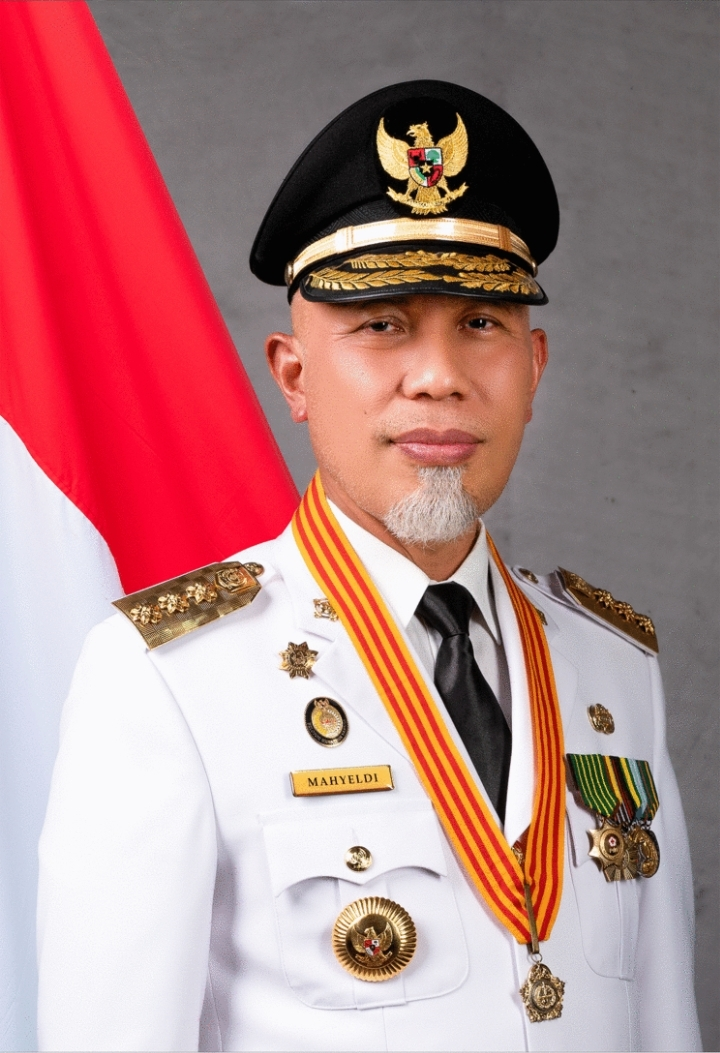

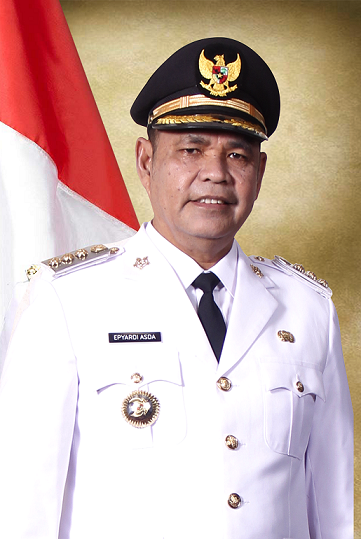
Candidate	Mahyeldi Ansharullah	Epyardi Asda
Party	PKS	PAN
Alliance	KIM Plus	–
Running mate	Vasko Ruseimy	Ekos Albar
Popular vote	1,757,612	521,448
Percentage	77.12%	22.88%
- Results map by district
Governor before election
Mahyeldi Ansharullah
PKS
Elected Governor
Mahyeldi Ansharullah
PKS

The 2024 West Sumatra gubernatorial election was held on 27 November 2024 as part of nationwide local elections to elect the governor and vice governor of West Sumatra for a five-year term. The previous election was held in 2020. Incumbent Governor Mahyeldi Ansharullah of the Prosperous Justice Party (PKS) won re-election in a landslide with 77% of the vote. His sole opponent, former Solok Regent Epyardi Asda of the National Mandate Party (PAN), received 22%.

== Electoral system ==
The election, like other local elections in 2024, follow the first-past-the-post system where the candidate with the most votes wins the election, even if they do not win a majority. It is possible for a candidate to run uncontested, in which case the candidate is still required to win a majority of votes "against" an "empty box" option. Should the candidate fail to do so, the election will be repeated on a later date.

== Political map ==
Following the 2024 Indonesian legislative election, nine political parties are represented in the West Sumatra Regional House of Representatives (DPRD):

Political parties	Seat count
Prosperous Justice Party (PKS)	10 / 65
Great Indonesia Movement Party (Gerindra)	10 / 65
NasDem Party	9 / 65
Party of Functional Groups (Golkar)	9 / 65
National Mandate Party (PAN)	8 / 65
Democratic Party (Demokrat)	8 / 65
United Development Party (PPP)	5 / 65
Indonesian Democratic Party of Struggle (PDI-P)	3 / 65
National Awakening Party (PKB)	3 / 65

== Candidates ==
According to electoral regulations, in order to qualify for the election, candidates were required to secure support from a political party or a coalition of parties controlling 13 seats (20 percent of all seats) in the West Sumatra DPRD. As no parties won 13 or more seats in the 2024 legislative election, parties are required to form coalitions in order to nominate candidates. Candidates may alternatively demonstrate support to run as an independent in form of photocopies of identity cards, which in West Sumatra's case corresponds to 347,532 copies. One independent candidate registered with the General Elections Commission (KPU), but did not submit the proof of support.

=== Declared ===
The following individuals qualified to be candidates:

1
Candidate from PKS and Gerindra
Mahyeldi Ansharullah	Vasko Ruseimy
for Governor	for Vice Governor
	nirbing
Governor of West Sumatra (2021–2024)	Chairman of Gerindra Party (2020–2025)
Parties
31 / 65 (48%) PKS (10 seats); Gerindra (10 seats); Demokrat (8 seats); PKB (3 seats)

2
Candidate from PAN and NasDem
Epyardi Asda	Ekos Albar
for Governor	for Vice Governor
Regent of Solok (2021–2024)	Deputy Mayor of Padang (2023–2024)
Parties
29 / 65 (45%) NasDem (9 seats); Golkar (9 seats); PAN (8 seats); PDI-P (3 seats)

=== Potential ===
The following are individuals who have either been publicly mentioned as a potential candidate by a political party in the DPRD, publicly declared their candidacy with press coverage, or considered as a potential candidate by media outlets:

- Mahyeldi Ansharullah (PKS), incumbent governor and former mayor of Padang.
- Epyardi Asda (PAN), regent of Solok, former three-term member of the House of Representatives.
- Lisda Hendrajoni (NasDem), member of House of Representatives.

== Opinion polls ==
=== Before nomination ===
Pollster	Date	Sample size	Margin of error	Mahyeldi Ansharullah	Andre Rosiade	Mulyadi	Audy Joinaldy	Sutan Riska	Epyardi Asda	Fadly Amran
SBLF	1-8 January 2024	4,800	±1%	52.08%	15.06%	14.60%	6.44%	4.14%	3.44%	3.17%

== Results ==
Candidate	Running mate	Party	Votes	%
Mahyeldi Ansharullah	Vasko Ruseimy	Prosperous Justice Party	1,757,612	77.12
Epyardi Asda	Ekos Albar	National Mandate Party	521,448	22.88
Total			2,279,060	100.00
Valid votes			2,279,060	97.02
Invalid votes			70,009	2.98
Total votes			2,349,069	100.00
Registered voters/turnout			4,103,084	57.25
Source: KPU Sumatera Barat
