= Indonesian Young Entrepreneur Association =

Indonesian Young Entrepreneurs Association
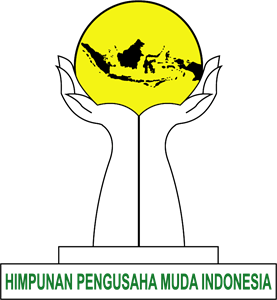
- Abbreviation: Indonesian Young Entrepreneurs Association (HIPMI)
- Formation: June 10, 1972; 54 years ago
- Type: Non-governmental, Young entrepreneur
- Legal status: Organization with special regulations
- Headquarters: Menara Bidakara 2 Lt. 17 Jl. Gatot Subroto Kav. 71-73, RT 8 / RW 8 Menteng Dalam, Kec. Tebet, Jakarta, Indonesia
- Region served: Indonesian
- Key people: Akbar Buchari

The Indonesian Young Entrepreneurs Association (Indonesian: Himpunan Pengusaha Muda Indonesia) abbreviated as HIPMI, is an independent, non-partisan organization of young Indonesian entrepreneurs engaged in the economic sector. The organization was founded on June 10, 1972, by several national entrepreneurs including Drs. Abdul Latief, Ir. Siswono Yudo Husodo, Teuku Sjahrul, Datuk Hakim Thantawi, Badar Tando, Drs. Rudy Kairupan, Irawan Djajaatmadja, SH, Hari Sjamsudin Mangaan, Pontjo Sutowo, and Ir. Mahdi Diah.

The establishment of this organization was driven by the spirit of fostering entrepreneurship among the youth. On November 23, 2022, Akbar Buchari was elected as the Chairman of the Indonesian Young Entrepreneurs Association (term 2022–2025), succeeding the previous chairman, Mardani H. Maming.

== Organizational Structure ==
The organizational structure of HIPMI exists at both the central and regional levels. HIPMI has established a Central Executive Board (BPP) headquartered in the capital city, Regional Executive Boards based in the provincial capitals, and Branch Executive Boards based in the regency/city capitals. To date, HIPMI has a presence in 37 provinces in Indonesia and comprises 354 Branch Executive Boards. In line with regional autonomy and expansion, HIPMI continues to grow to ensure representation throughout Indonesia.

== Membership ==
The organization's regulations establish two types of membership. Regular Members are those aged 17 – 40 years. Those who have surpassed the age of 41 are granted the status of Extraordinary Members, commonly referred to as Seniors. Membership is open to anyone who owns a business.

== HIPMI University (HIPMI PT) ==
HIPMI University, established on August 21, 2006, is an autonomous organization initiated by Erwin Aksa, Raja Sapta Oktohari, and Bahlil Lahadalia. The organization was first inaugurated by Jusuf Kalla, the Vice President of the Republic of Indonesia, and Erwin Aksa, Chairman of HIPMI for the 2008–2011 period. As its name suggests, HIPMI PT accepts members who are still undergraduate, master's, and doctoral students. With the presence of HIPMI PT, it is hoped that students can create job opportunities rather than just seeking employment.

HIPMI initiated this organization due to the high unemployment rate in Indonesia. The organization observed that a significant portion of the unemployed were educated individuals. Therefore, university students are trained to become Economic Heroes who can improve the quality of human resources mentally, create jobs, and develop businesses effectively. The types of businesses run by HIPMI PT members are typically medium-sized enterprises, such as restaurants, cafes, freelance design services, and so on.

== Types of Member Businesses ==
- Plantation, Agriculture, Forestry, and Fisheries
- Mining
- Chemical Industry, Electronics Industry, Automotive
- Parts Industry, Furniture Industry
- Tourism
- Civil and Mechanical Construction Services
- Consultancy Services
- Procurement Services
- Financial Services
- Digital Services
- Distribution
- Other Services

== List of Chairman of HIPMI ==
No	Name	Start date	End date
1	Abdul Latief	1972	1973
2	Siswono Yudo Husodo	1973	1977
3	Aburizal Bakrie	1977	1979
4	Pontjo Sutowo	1979	1983
5	Agung Laksono	1983	1986
6	Sharif Cicip Sutarjo	1986	1989
7	Bambang Riyadi Soegomo	1989	1992
8	Adi Putra Darmawan Tahir	1992	1995
9	Bambang Atmanto Wiyogo	1995	1998
10	Hariyadi Budisantoso Sukamdani	1998	2001
11	Muhammad Lutfi	2001	2005
12	Sandiaga Salahuddin Uno	2005	2008
13	Erwin Aksa Mahmud	2008	2011
14	Raja Sapta Oktohari	2011	2015
15	Bahlil Lahadalia	2015	2019
16	Mardani H. Maming	2019	2022
Plt.	Eka Sastra	2022	2022
17	Akbar Buchari	2022	2025

== Structure BPP HIPMI 2022–2025 ==
NO	NAMA	JABATAN
1	Akbar Buchari	Chairman
2	Bobby Nasution	Vice Chairman
3	Tri Febrianto Damu	Head of Division 1
4	Vasko Ruseimy	Head of Division 2
5	Elia Nelson Kumaat	Head of Division 3
6	Afifuddin Suhaeli Kalla	Head of Division 4
7	Mufti Anam	Head of Division 5
8	Arie Nanda Djausal	Head of Division 6
9	M. Hadi Nainggolan	Head of Division 7
10	Alvin Kennedy	Head of Division 8
11	Tri Febriyanto Damu	Head of Division 9
12	Muliandy Nasution	Head of Division 10
13	Celny Pitasari	Head of Division 11
14	M. Aaron Sampetoding	Head of Division 12
15	Anggawira	Secretary General
16	Reynaldo Bryan T. Allo	General Treasurer

== See also ==
- HIPMI on Instagram
