= Taj Mahal replicas and derivatives =

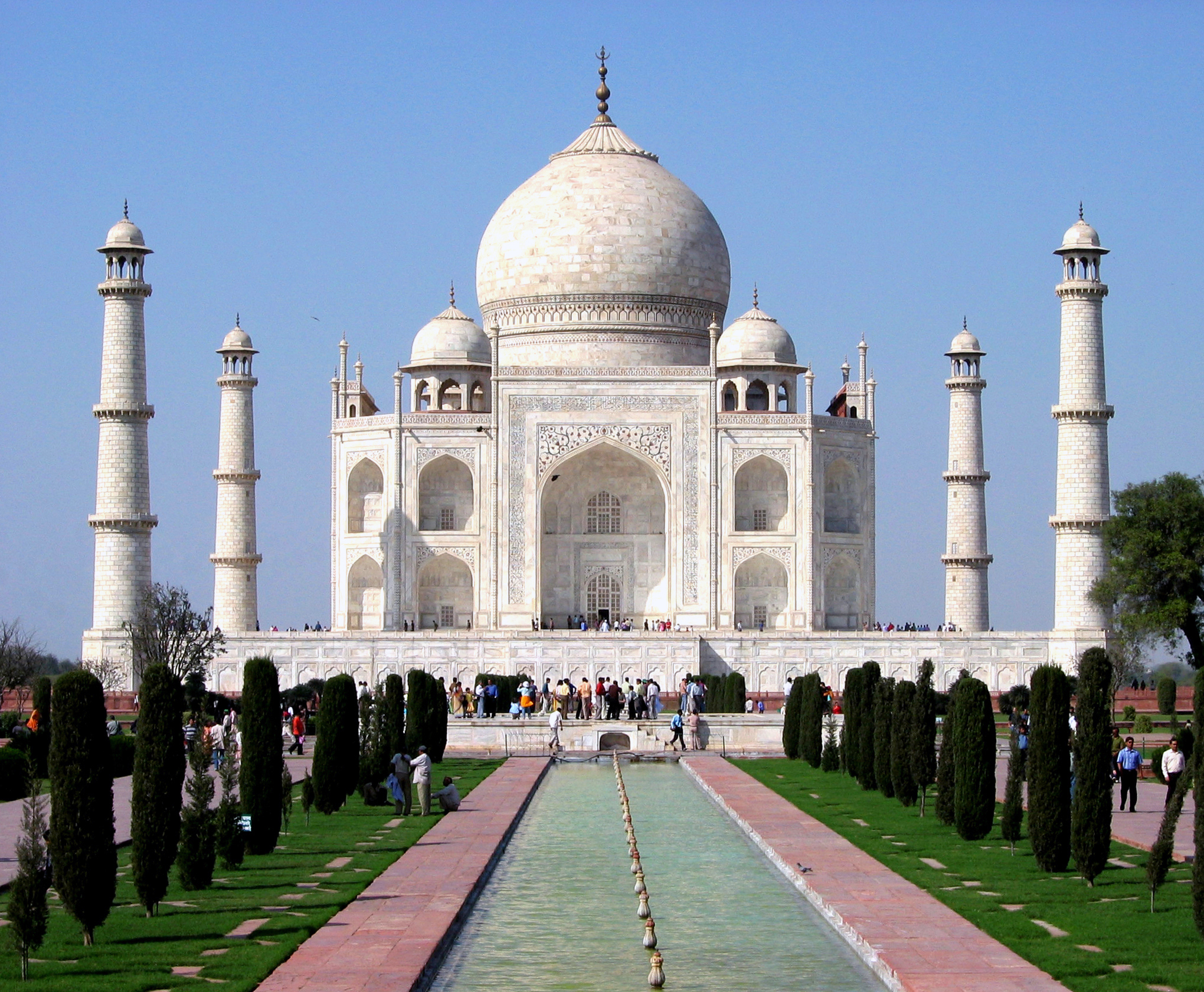
The Taj Mahal in Agra, India (2004)

The Taj Mahal, an iconic structure in Agra, Uttar Pradesh, India, has inspired numerous replicas and derivatives. It is a major tourist attraction and has been regarded as one of the seven wonders of the modern world. Commissioned in 1632 by Mughal emperor Shah Jahan to house the tomb of his favorite wife, Mumtaz Mahal, it was completed in 1653. The monument has inspired many notable replicas including a project started by the emperor's grandson in 1668. While some are intended to be scale models or otherwise to be more or less faithful copies, and others are designed with mild or extreme interpretations of the Taj's architecture adapted to serve other purposes.

== List of replicas ==
=== Eurasia ===
Name	Location	Country	Image	Notes	Reference
Taj Mahal Bangladesh	Dhaka	Bangladesh		The project was initiated by Bangladeshi filmmaker Ahsanullah Moni in 2008.	
Bajra Shahi Mosque	Sonaimuri	Bangladesh		The mosque was built by Aman Ullah in 1741-42 during the reign of the Mughal emperor Muhammad Shah.	
Bibi Ka Maqbara	Aurangabad	India		It was built in 1668 by Prince Azam Khan, son of Mughal emperor Aurangzeb in memory of his mother Dilras Banu Begum.	
Shahzadi Ka Maqbara	Lucknow	India		It was built as the tomb of Princess Zinat Asiya, daughter of the third Nawab of Awadh, Muhammad Ali Shah in the 19th century.	
Maqbara Yadgare Mohabbat Tajammuli Begum	Bulandshahr	India		It was built in 2015 by a retired post master Faizul Hasan Qadri in memory of his wife Tajamulli Begum, who died in 2011.	
Taj of Bangalore	Bengaluru	India		A 40 feet tall and 70 feet by 70 feet wide replica located on Bannerghatta Road, built by Malaysian architect, Sekar in September 2015.	
Taj Mahal, Kota	Kota	India		A replica of the Taj Mahal in the Seven Wonders park.	
Taj Mahal of China	Shenzhen	China		A replica of the Taj Mahal in the Window of the World theme park.	
Al-Hakim Mosque	Padang	Indonesia		It is a mosque located in West Sumatra.	
Ramlie Musofa Mosque	Jakarta	Indonesia		The mosque was built by Haji Ramlie Rasidin and completed in 2016.	
Siddiqa Fatima Zahra Mosque	Kuwait City	Kuwait		Completed in 2011, it is a small mosque located in the Dahiya Abdullah Mubarak community near the Kuwait International Airport.	
Mini Taj Mahal	Nusajaya	Malaysia		It is located in Legoland Malaysia Resort.	
Sohaibani and Partners Law Firm Head Office	Riyadh	Saudi Arabia		Located in the King Abdullah District	
Taj Arabia	Dubai	United Arab Emirates		It is part of Falcon City of Wonders development and has not yet been built. Planned to be taller than the original Taj Mahal and to be a luxury Indian hotel and palace.	
Mini Taj Mahal	Dubai	United Arab Emirates		Built in 2016 and made of Lego blocks, it is located at Legoland Dubai.	
Taj Mahal Replica	Dubai	United Arab Emirates		It is located at Global Village and is used as a jewellery shop	
Royal Pavilion	Brighton	United Kingdom		It is a formal royal residence which was built in three stages, beginning in 1787.	

=== The Americas ===
Name	Location	Country	Image	Notes	Reference
Thomas Foster Memorial Temple	Uxbridge	Canada		It is a memorial to the Canadian Politician, Thomas Foster.	
Taj Mahal Houseboat	Sausalito	United States of America		It was built by Bill Harlan and was sold off in 2016.	
Trump Taj Mahal	Atlantic City	United States of America		It was a casino located which was redeveloped into Hard Rock Hotel & Casino Atlantic City.	
Tripoli Shrine Temple	Milwaukee	United States of America		It was completed in 1928 and serves as the headquarters to Milwaukee's Shriners International.	
Taj Mahal Replica	Bogotá	Colombia		It is part of Jaime Duque Park.	
