= Mahyeldi Ansharullah =

Indonesian politician

Mahyeldi Ansharullah Datuak Marajo
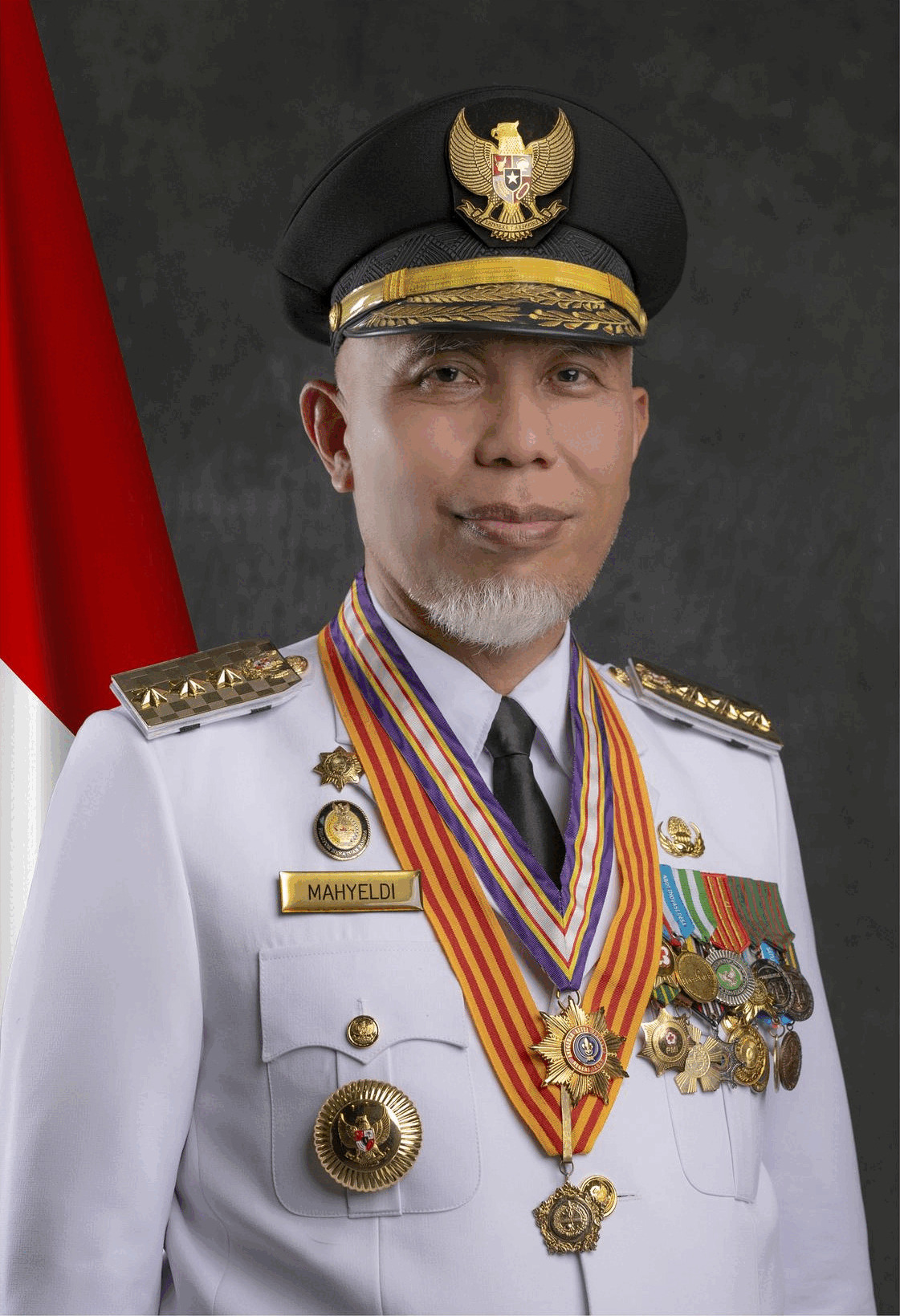
- Official portrait, 2025

10th Governor of West Sumatra
- Incumbent
- Assumed office 25 February 2021
- Deputy: Audy Joinaldy (2021–2025); Vasko Ruseimy (2025–present)
- Preceded by: Hamdani (interim)

14th Mayor of Padang
- In office 13 May 2014 – 25 February 2021
- Deputy: Emzalmi (2014–2019); Hendri Septa (2019–2021)
- Preceded by: Erizal Agus (acting)
- Succeeded by: Hendri Septa

Deputy Mayor of Padang
- In office 18 February 2009 – 18 February 2014
- Preceded by: Yusman Kasim
- Succeeded by: Emzalmi

Deputy Speaker of the West Sumatra Regional House of Representatives
- In office 2004–2009

Personal details
- Born: 25 December 1966 (age 59) Bukittinggi, West Sumatra, Indonesia
- Party: PKS
- Other political affiliations: KIM Plus (2024–present)
- Spouse: Harneli Bahar (m. 1989)
- Children: 9
- Parent(s): Mardanis Sutan Tanameh (father); Nurmi (mother)
- Education: Andalas University; Sultan Abdul Halim Mu'adzam Shah International Islamic University
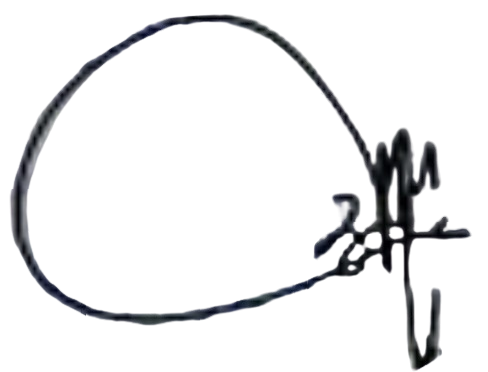
- Signature

Mahyeldi Ansharullah (born 25 December 1966) is an Indonesian politician from the Prosperous Justice Party (PKS) who is currently serving his second term as the governor of West Sumatra. He previously served as the mayor of Padang for two terms following victories in the 2013 and 2018 elections, and as deputy mayor from 2009 to 2014. He first became an elected official in 2004 when he was elected to the provincial council as deputy speaker, serving until 2009.

Active in Islamic daʿwah since his university years in Andalas University, he became a key figure of the Islamist Prosperous Justice Party in West Sumatra. His programs as mayor of Padang and governor have included infrastructural reorganization, public hygiene campaigns, and educational enhancement emphasizing studies of the Quran.

== Early life and education ==
Mahyeldi was born on 25 December 1966 in the city of Bukittinggi, West Sumatra. He is the eldest of seven siblings. His father, Mardanis Sutan Tanameh bin Musa, worked as a port porter and a becak driver, while his mother, Nurmi, was a housewife. Since he was in the third grade of elementary school, he worked to help support his family. When he was in the fifth grade, his family moved to Dumai, where he graduated from State Elementary School 9 Dumai in 1980. He continued his education at State Junior High School 1 Dumai, graduating in 1983. During his junior high school years, he sold fish in the morning and worked as a newspaper delivery boy at night, alongside working at bookstores.

Upon entering his second year of junior high, his family moved back to Bukittinggi, where he enrolled in State Junior High School 2 Tilatang Kamang and served as a student council (OSIS) administrator from 1981 to 1983. He then attended State Senior High School 1 Bukittinggi and became head of the Islamic spiritual extracurricular group (Rohani Islam) in 1985. Throughout high school, he continued selling newspapers in the morning, sold cakes in the afternoon, and herded buffalos to fund his future education.

After graduating high school in 1986, he was accepted into the Rural Development study program at the Faculty of Agriculture, Andalas University (Unand). There, he served as an administrator for the Agricultural Faculty Student Executive Board (BEM) in 1990. During his studies, he met Irwan Prayitno—who toured West Sumatra to socialize Campus Dakwah Institution frameworks—sparking his lifelong political and ideological alignment with dakwah movements. He earned his Bachelor of Agriculture degree in 1995.

Alongside Irwan Prayitno and Syukri Arief, he co-founded the Adzkia tutoring center in Lolong, Padang, in 1987. From 1988 to 2000, Mahyeldi served as the director of Ma'had Almadaniy. Decades later, he pursued postgraduate studies, obtaining a Master of Management degree from Sultan Abdul Halim Mu'adzam Shah International Islamic University in Malaysia in 2025. He also served two terms as the Chairman of the Andalas University Faculty of Agriculture Alumni Association (IKA-FP) from 2014 to 2024.

== Political career ==
=== Early political career ===
Following the fall of Suharto, Mahyeldi helped establish the Justice Party (PK) in West Sumatra in 1998, serving as deputy chairman alongside regional chairman Ahmad Shafwan Nawawi. When civil servants were legally barred from holding political party leadership roles, Shafwan resigned to continue his academic career at IAIN Imam Bonjol, and Mahyeldi was appointed as the Chairman of the West Sumatra Justice Party. After failing to pass the parliamentary threshold in the 1999 legislative election, the party transformed into the Prosperous Justice Party (PKS) in 2003, with Mahyeldi remaining regional chairman until 2005, when he was succeeded by Trinda Farhan Satria.

In the 2004 legislative election, Mahyeldi ran for a seat in the West Sumatra Regional House of Representatives (DPRD) representing the West Sumatra 1 electoral district (covering Padang), winning 25,803 votes—the highest tally in the district. He served as Deputy Speaker of the DPRD from 2004 to 2009, during which he gained public attention for refusing to use a luxury official ministerial vehicle.

He subsequently ran in the 2008 Padang local election as the running mate of incumbent mayor Fauzi Bahar. Following their victory, Mahyeldi was inaugurated as Deputy Mayor of Padang on 18 February 2009 for a five-year term, relinquishing his legislative seat.

=== Mayor of Padang (2014–2021) ===
Mahyeldi ran for mayor in the 2013 Padang mayoral election alongside Emzalmi. According to an audit report by the Corruption Eradication Commission (KPK) released in October 2013, Mahyeldi reported a modest personal wealth of approximately Rp281.5 million. The pair secured 29.45% of the vote in the first round on 30 October 2013, and won the runoff on 5 March 2014 with 50.29% of the vote. Although delayed due to legal challenges at the Constitutional Court filed by losing candidates, Mahyeldi was officially sworn in as mayor on 13 May 2014. He was re-elected in 2018 with Hendri Septa as his deputy.

Mahyeldi receiving the Top 40 Public Service Innovation 2018 award for Padang from Vice President Jusuf Kalla.

==== Tourism, investment, and urban development ====
During his mayoral tenure, tourist arrivals and regional revenue (PAD) increased substantially. Tourism-related PAD rose from Rp17.8 billion in 2015 to Rp104.9 billion in 2019. Real investment realization surged from Rp357.6 billion in 2016 to Rp2.2 trillion in 2019. These accomplishments earned Padang multiple Indonesia Attractiveness Awards (IAA) between 2015 and 2018.

Mahyeldi received widespread acclaim for infrastructure projects and urban re-planning, particularly the revitalization of Padang Beach, clearing land corridors along the Padang By Pass road, and modernizing the central Pasar Raya Padang market. Unlike typical contentious urban clearances, these relocations occurred largely without riots or violent police resistance, as merchants voluntarily dismantled their stalls. Prominent figures like Adhyaksa Dault cited Mahyeldi and Surabaya mayor Tri Rismaharini as exemplary administrators capable of handling urban renewal without public backlash.

==== Cleanliness and infrastructure ====
The atmosphere of Padang Beach in 2015 (top) and after its reorganization in 2018 (bottom). Vendors selling on the beach agreed to be relocated, even dismantling their own stalls.

Following the devastation of the 2009 Sumatra earthquakes, Padang struggled with waste management and lost its national cleanliness standing. On 25 October 2014, Mahyeldi initiated the "Padang Bersih" (Clean Padang) program, establishing decentralized waste management units (LPS) across sub-districts. In 2017, Padang successfully reclaimed the Adipura award after an eight-year absence. Furthermore, his administration constructed over 471 kilometers of neighborhood roads across districts such as Lubuk Minturun, Air Dingin, and Balai Gadang, surpassing initial infrastructure targets.

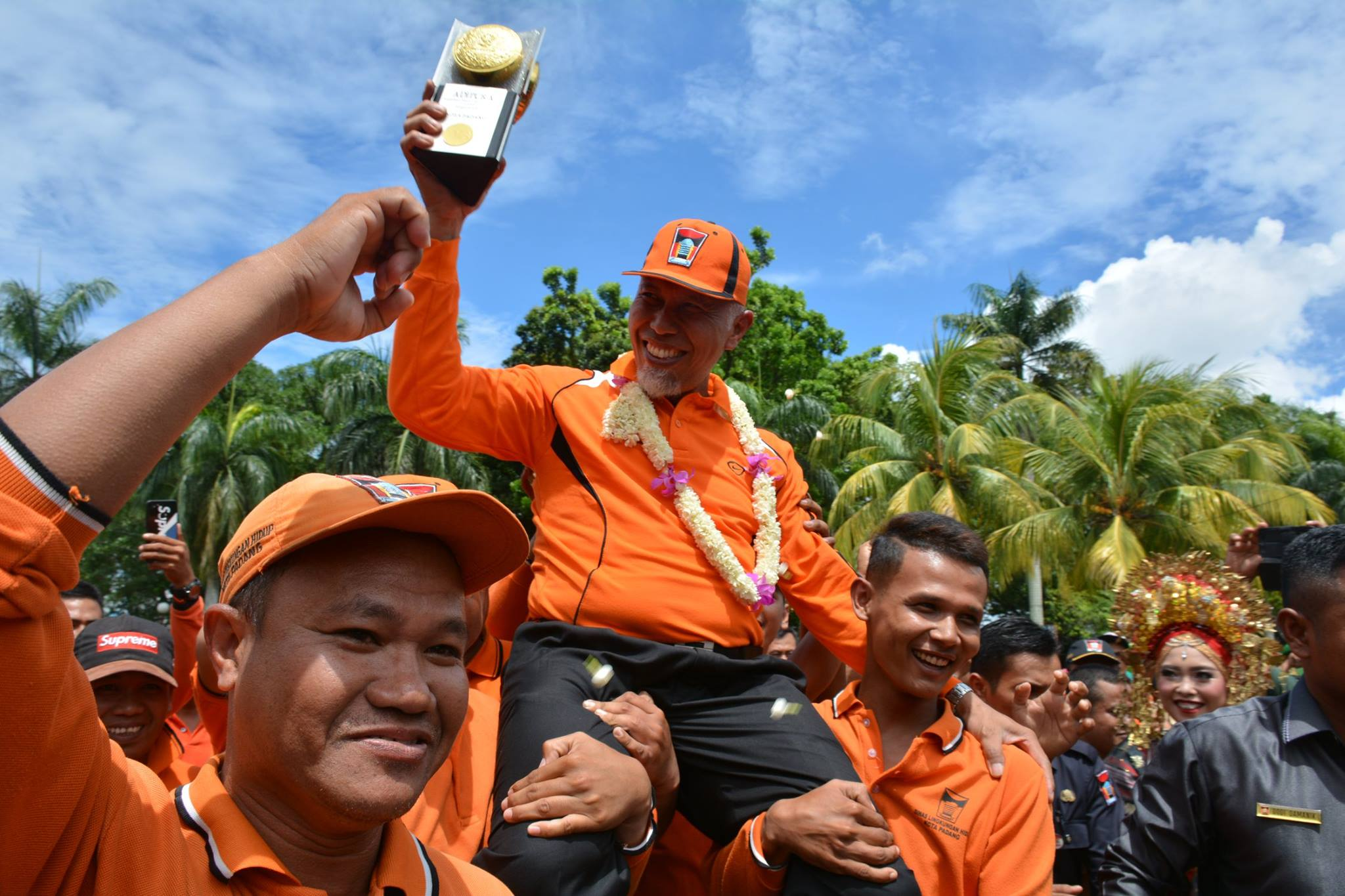
Mayor Mahyeldi paraded by sanitation workers while welcoming the Adipura trophy in 2017.

==== Social welfare and religious policies ====
In education and religion, Mahyeldi introduced mandatory pesantren programs during Ramadan for public school students starting in 2015, replacing traditional mosque arrangements, and granted school choice privileges to students who memorized specified portions of the Quran. He instituted a 12-year free basic education policy and launched a housing rehabilitation program (RTLH) targeting 1,000 poor households annually through community self-reliance, local zakat boards (Baznas), and corporate CSR contributions.

In November 2018, Mahyeldi led a large-scale civic rally condemning LGBT individuals in Padang, declaring official governmental resistance against public rights or advocacy for sexual minorities. (Note: Original: "Kepada pelaku maksiat mari bertobat dan pihak-pihak yang melindungi segera insyaf karena akan berhadapan dengan seluruh pihak dan masyarakat yang ada di Padang juga aparat keamanan.") Additionally, in response to the COVID-19 pandemic in March 2020, Mahyeldi voluntarily donated six months of his salary to support municipal health interventions.

=== Governor of West Sumatra (2021–present) ===
Mahyeldi (far left) receiving congratulations from President Joko Widodo following his inauguration as Governor of West Sumatra.

Rumors regarding Mahyeldi’s gubernatorial ambitions began circulating in mid-2018. Backed by PKS and the United Development Party (PPP), Mahyeldi ran alongside Audy Joinaldy in the 2020 West Sumatra gubernatorial election, winning 726,853 votes (32.43% of the total valid ballots). Following the dismissal of legal challenges by the Constitutional Court, he was inaugurated by President Joko Widodo on 25 February 2021. Concurrently, Mahyeldi was re-elected as the DPW PKS Chairman for West Sumatra for the 2020–2025 term.

During the Delta wave of the pandemic in 2021, Mahyeldi faced local and national scrutiny regarding low mask compliance across West Sumatra and the lack of regional budgetary support for the infectious disease laboratory at Andalas University. He defended his administration by stating citizens suffered from "mask fatigue" and emphasized that provincial allocations remained prioritized across regional infrastructure and stunting reduction.

In the 2024 West Sumatra gubernatorial election, Mahyeldi ran for a second term, pairing with Vasko Ruseimy under a coalition comprising PKS, Gerindra, the Democratic Party, Perindo, and PBB. The Mahyeldi–Vasko ticket won a landslide victory with 1,757,612 votes (77.12%). The KPU officially confirmed their re-election on 9 January 2025.

== Controversies ==
On 15 April 2023, Mahyeldi publicly accused media outlets of spreading hoaxes after journalists questioned an official circular issued by the provincial government permitting civil servants to use state-owned official vehicles for personal Eid al-Fitr homecoming travel. The remarks drew fierce backlash from local press organizations, including the Padang branch of the Alliance of Independent Journalists (AJI) and the Indonesian Cyber Media Association (AMSI), prompting subsequent formal clarifications and apologies from the provincial administration.

== Personal life ==
Mahyeldi and his wife, Harneli Bahar.

Mahyeldi married Harneli Bahar—a native of Batuhampar, Lima Puluh Kota—on 12 May 1989 after a 15-day traditional Islamic courtship (taaruf). At the time, Mahyeldi was in his sixth semester at Andalas University, while Harneli studied at IKIP Padang (now Universitas Negeri Padang). Harneli later ran as a legislative candidate for the regional parliament in 2019 and the national parliament in 2024, though she did not win a seat.

The couple has nine children (three sons and six daughters). Their eldest son, Muhammad Taufiqur Rahman, ran unsuccessfully for the West Sumatra regional parliament in 2024. Taufiq served briefly as the acting chairman of the Indonesian Solidarity Party (PSI) in West Sumatra from October 2025 to January 2026. Taufiq's wedding reception in April 2025 drew public criticism due to severe traffic congestion caused along the Trans-Sumatra Highway in Sijunjung Regency. In response to public sentiment and regional emergencies, Mahyeldi canceled subsequent wedding receptions for three of his other sons in December 2025, directing his family to redirect resources toward assisting victims of the devastating 2025 Sumatra floods and landslides.

== Honours ==
- Lencana Abdi Inovasi Desa (Badge of Village Innovation Service) - 2024
- Satyalancana Pembangunan (Medal for Contributing in National Development) - 2023
- Satyalancana Kebhaktian Sosial (Medal for Service in Social Welfare) - 2018
- Manggala Karya Kencana (Medal of Population and Family Development) - 2013
- Lencana Melati (Badge of Melati) - 2013
- Lencana Darma Bakti (Badge of Darma Bakti) - 2013

== Footnotes ==
Political offices
| Preceded by Irwan Prayitno | Governor of West Sumatra; 2021–present | Incumbent |
| Preceded by Fauzi Bahar | Mayor of Padang; 2014–2021 | Succeeded by Hendri Septa |
| Preceded by Yusman Kasim | Deputy Mayor of Padang; 2009–2014 | Succeeded by Emzalmi |
