= Taj Mahal Bangladesh =

Replica of the Taj Mahal in Bangladesh

Coordinates: 23°44′46″N 90°34′03″E

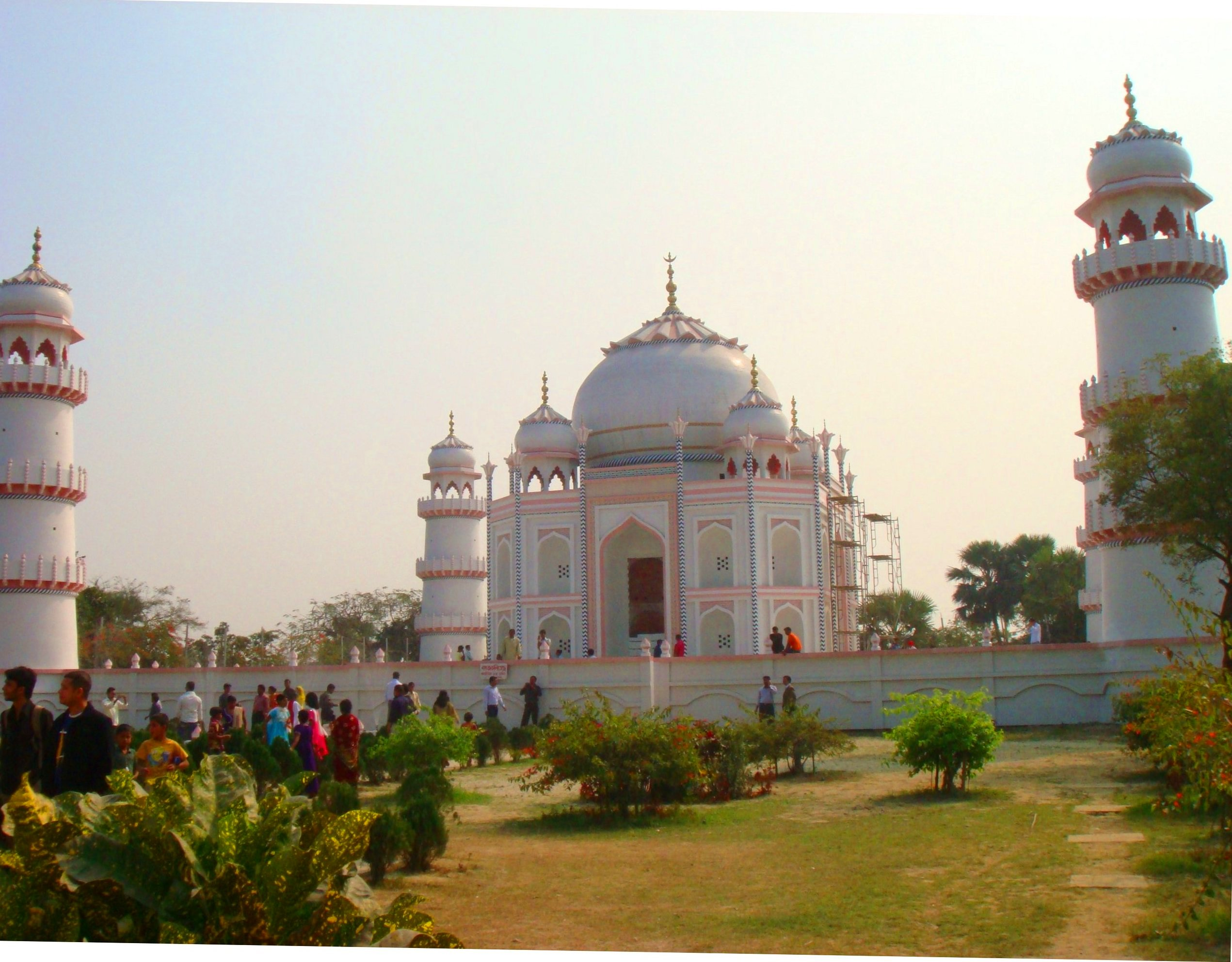
The completed structure

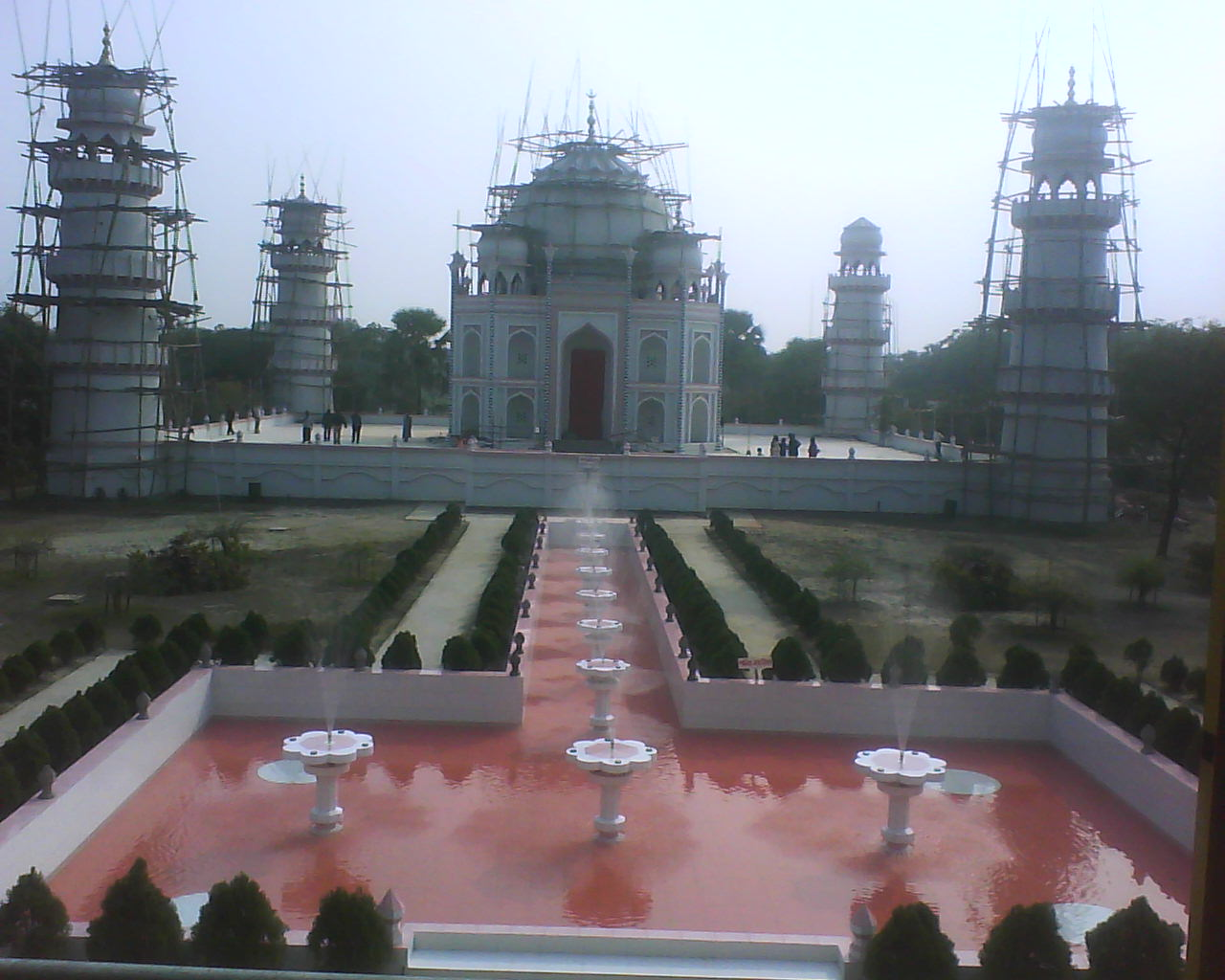
The Taj Mahal under construction

Taj Mahal Bangladesh (Bengali: তাজ মহল বাংলাদেশ) is an architectural imitation of Taj Mahal, a Mughal mausoleum in Agra, India,. The structure was built by Ahsanullah Moni, a Bangladeshi film-maker, as a tourism destination for low-income families from Bangladesh. Construction of the 1.6 hectare complex took five years from 2003 to 2008, and cost about $58 million. It was opened to the public in March, 2009.

== Controversy ==
The Indian High Commission expressed concern about possible copyright infringement of the original building, despite it being "unlikely to detract from the magnificence of the original".

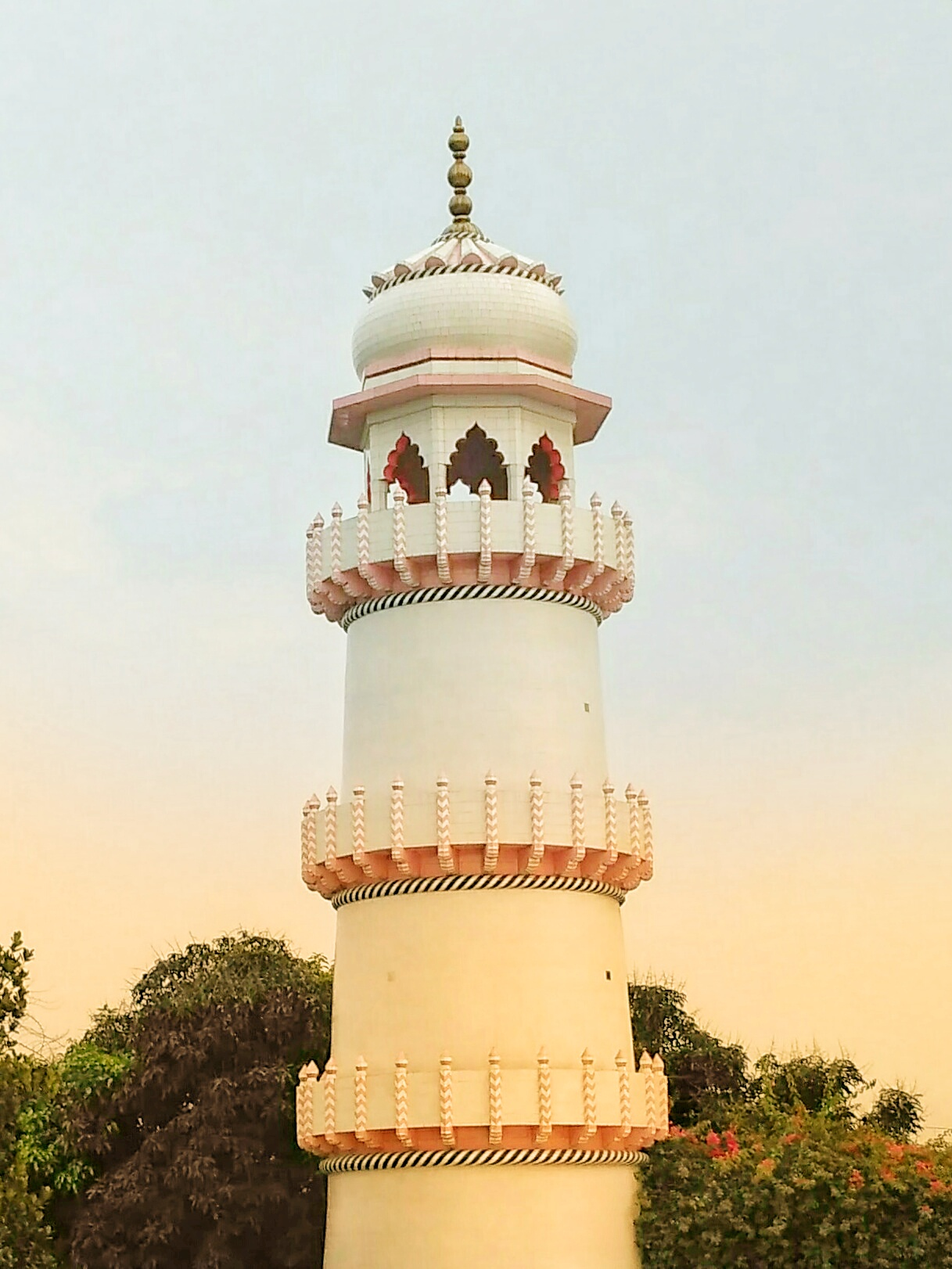
Closed view of a Minar of Tajmahal Bangladesh

== See also ==
- Taj Mahal replicas and derivatives
