= Taj Mahal, Bulandshahr =

Taj Mahal or Mini Taj Mahal or Qadri's Taj Mahal, officially known as Maqbara Yadgare Mohabbat Tajammuli Begum is a scaled-down replica of the historic Taj Mahal of Agra located in Kaser Kalan, a small village in Bulandshahr of Uttar Pradesh, India. It was built by an 81-year-old retired postmaster, Faizul Hasan Qadri in the memory of his dead wife Tajamulli Begum, who died due to throat cancer in 2011.

== Construction ==
A total of Rs 15 lakh spent in construction of Qadri's Taj Mahal. Faizul Hasan Qadri sold a piece of land for ₹ 6 lac and his wife's jewellery for ₹ 1.5 lac and got the mausoleum constructed with the help of a local. Qadri refused to take financial help of then CM Akhilesh Yadav, as he wanted to build it from his saving. The work for Qadri's 'Taj Mahal' has been halted due to lack of finances. However, it was completed and his wife was interred in the central tomb. The tomb, dome and 4 minarets are made out of concrete and bricks. It was initially planned to be covered in marble and be surrounded by an ornate garden, but due to financial reasons, that plan was shelved.

== About founder ==
In June 2017, it was reported by Hindustan Times that Faizul Hasn Qadri donated his last piece of land for a government school for girls, even when his ‘Taj Mahal’ project was incomplete, due to lack of finances.

The founder of Taj Mahal, Bulandshahr, Faizul Hasn Qadri died on 9 November 2018 in a road accident. He was buried next to his wife in the tomb.

== In popular culture ==
In 2016, it was featured in History TV18's TV show OMG! Yeh Mera India of Season 2, hosted by Krushna Abhishek.

== See also ==
- Taj Mahal replicas and derivatives
