= Padang Beach =

Beach in Padang, West Sumatra, Indonesia

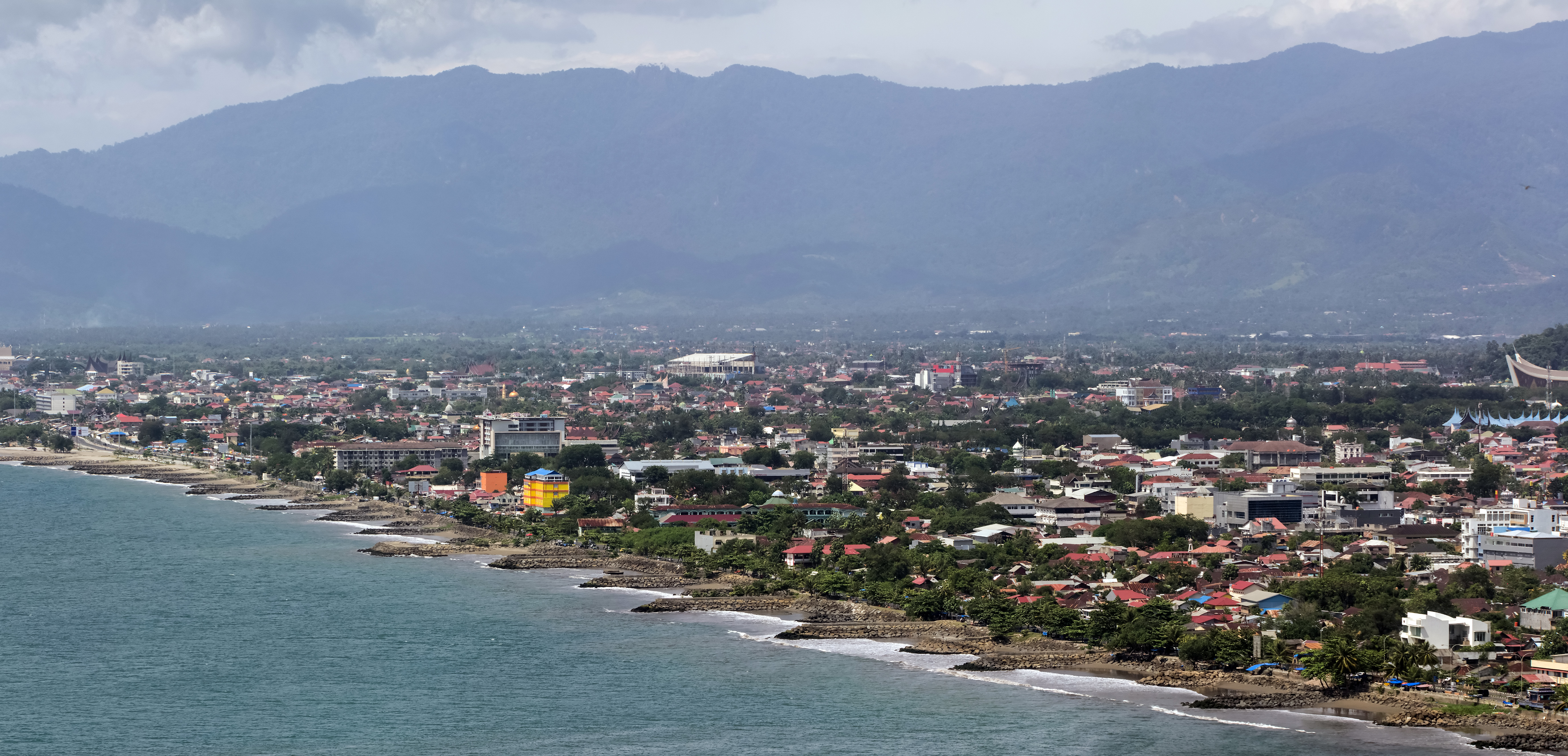
Padang beach and Padang city

Padang Beach or popularly known as Taplau (short for tapi lauik, Minang language which means waterfront) is a beach located in the city of Padang, West Sumatra, Indonesia. This beach is located in a dense urban area in the District of West Padang, and extends from Purus to Batang Arau estuary. The beach is approximately 23 km from Minangkabau International Airport or 30 minutes by car. Notable buildings include the Al-Hakim Mosque.
